= T. J. Johnston =

American Anglican bishop (born 1956)

The Right Reverend T. J. Johnston
- Retired Missionary Bishop, Anglican Mission in the Americas
- Church: Anglican Church in North America
- Other posts: Assisting Bishop, Diocese of Churches for the Sake of Others

Orders
- Consecration: June 24, 2001 by Emmanuel Kolini

Personal details
- Born: 1956 (age 68–69)
- Spouse: Rees Johnston

Thomas William "T. J." Johnston Jr. (born 1956) is an American lawyer and bishop of the Anglican Church in North America. As the first Episcopal priest whose orders were transferred to the Anglican Church of Rwanda in the 1990s, Johnston was a key figure in the Anglican realignment in the United States. Consecrated as a bishop in 2001 to serve in the Anglican Mission in the Americas, Johnston later became a church planter in South Carolina.

== Early life, education, and early career ==
Johnston has roots in Lowcountry South Carolina. He graduated from Spartanburg High School and from Sewanee with a B.S. in forestry. After working as a forester for Union Camp Corporation in Virginia and serving as a Young Life leader, Johnston went to law school in 1980. He received his J.D. from the Cumberland School of Law at Samford University and worked as a trial lawyer with an environmentally focused practice in Charleston for several years. Johnston is married to Rees; they have two grown children.

In 1991, Johnston was called to ordained ministry; he received his M.Div. from the School of Theology at Sewanee in 1994. He served first as an assistant at Grace Church in Charleston. He also worked as a volunteer with Luc Garnier, the Episcopal bishop of Haiti, coordinating partnerships between churches in Haiti and the United States.

== Anglican realignment ==
In 1996, Johnston became assistant rector at All Saints Episcopal Church, Pawleys Island. Under rector Chuck Murphy, All Saints Pawleys was a center of activity in the Anglican realignment. In September 1997, Murphy and Johnston were coordinators and signers of what became called the "First Promise" statement. The statement declared the authority of the Episcopal Church and its General Convention to be "fundamentally impaired" because they no longer upheld the "truth of the gospel.".

Meanwhile, in 1996 and 1997, a group of lay Episcopalians had been planting a church in Little Rock called St. Andrew's. Without the support of Bishop of Arkansas Larry Maze, the church received occasional pastoral visits from Johnston and other priests involved in the First Promise statement. In January 1998, St. Andrew's called Johnston as its first rector and he and his family moved to Little Rock. Maze refused to license Johnston in Arkansas, so South Carolina Bishop Ed Salmon issued letters dimissory transferring Johnston's canonical residence to the Anglican Diocese of Shyira under Bishop John Rucyahana over Maze's objections. Maze warned Johnston that he would be violating TEC canons "by accepting an irregular call in a diocese where he was not canonically resident." Salmon told Maze that he had issued letters dimissory "to try to keep Arkansas and South Carolina from being in dispute over this priest." This process was described by anthropologist Miranda Hassett described the move as a "loophole in Anglican polity to escape the authority of the Episcopal Church and its bishops." The "loophole" was closed; subsequent priests to leave the Episcopal Church for Rwanda and other provinces providing oversight to dissident U.S. and Canadian Anglicans either voluntarily renounced their orders or were inhibited and deposed. According to Johnston, "the national church passed a canon immediately blocking that kind of action from taking place again."

The issue eventually became a flashpoint at the 1998 Lambeth Conference, where TEC Presiding Bishop Frank T. Griswold and Maze met with Rwandan Primate Emmanuel Kolini and Rucyahana to head off further disputes. In a letter to Kolini, Griswold reminded him of Lambeth's 1988 resolution on the integrity of diocesan boundaries and asked the primate "to make clear to Bishop Rucyahana that his current plan is most unwise and harmful." Archbishop of Canterbury George Carey also interceded with both sides.

The conflict within the broader church continued. In 2000, the First Promise statement evolved into the Anglican Mission in America. Murphy and former Trinity School for Ministry dean John Rodgers were made bishops by Emmanuel Kolini and Moses Tay. They left the Episcopal Church and founded the AMIA with canonical residence in the Anglican Church of Rwanda St. Andrew's in Little Rock was a founding congregation of the AMIA and by 2000 had grown to 200 in weekly attendance.

In July 2001, Johnston was consecrated as a bishop by Kolini to serve the AMIA alongside Thad Barnum and two other former Episcopal priests in the . As was customary for AMIA bishops, Johnston remained rector of St. Andrew's in addition to overseeing congregations and clergy.

== Church planting ==
In 2005, Johnston was contacted by laypeople in Mount Pleasant, South Carolina, seeking to plant a new congregation in the northern part of the fast-growing Charleston suburb. He joined the group as its founding rector and the church became Saint Peter's Church. In 2009, Saint Peter's moved from rented space into a permanent facility in Mount Pleasant.

In 2010, AMIA—which had been a founding member of the ACNA the year before—left full membership, changing its status in ACNA to "ministry partner." By the next year, the relationship between AMIA chairman Murphy and the Anglican Church of Rwanda's house of bishops, led by Kolini's successor Onesphore Rwaje, had broken down over questions of financial transparency and collegiality. All but two AMIA bishops, Johnston among them, followed Murphy and AMIA out of Rwandan jurisdiction and restructured it as a "missionary society." Most AMIA congregations left the organization, either to join ACNA directly or to canonical "dual citizenship" with ACNA and Rwanda in PEARUSA.

Beginning in 2012, Johnston began a multi-year "process of reconciliation and restoration" with his former fellow ACNA bishops. While Saint Peter's remained in AMIA and Johnston continued to oversee AMIA congregations, Johnston moved his canonical residence to the ACNA Diocese of the South. Saint Peter's joined the Diocese of Churches for the Sake of Others (C4SO) in 2015, and in July 2016, Johnston was readmitted to the ACNA College of Bishops and appointed an assisting bishop in the C4SO Diocese.

== Later life ==
In 2021, Johnston retired as senior pastor of Saint Peter's and left active ministry to become COO and then CEO of Global Water Center, a nonprofit providing education, innovation, and collaboration to keep rural water sources safe and flowing for good. They partner with organizations, corporations, and governmental agencies on safe water access issues worldwide.
