= John Rucyahana =

Rwandan Anglican bishop (born 1945)

The Right Reverend John Rucyahana
- Bishop of Shyira
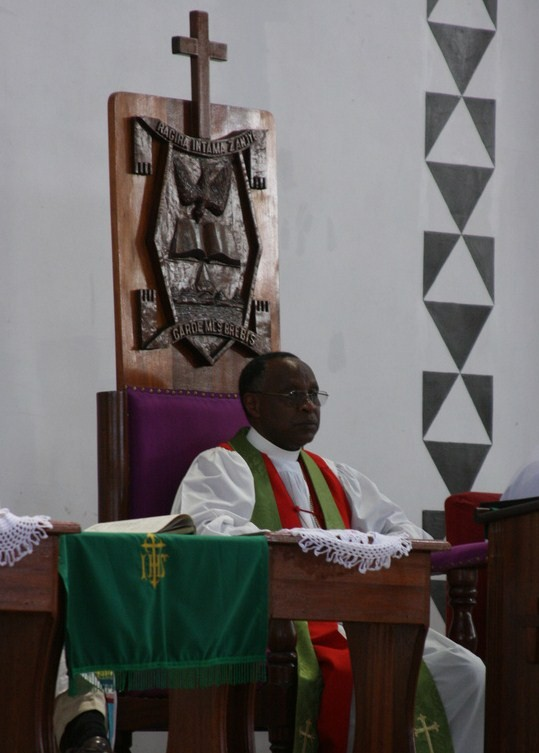
- Rucyahana in 2007
- Church: Anglican Church of Rwanda
- Diocese: Shyira
- In office: 1997–2010
- Predecessor: Augustin Nshamihigo
- Successor: Laurent Mbanda
- Other posts: Chairperson, National Unity and Reconciliation Commission (2010–21)

Orders
- Ordination: December 1974 (diaconate); September 1975 (priesthood)
- Consecration: June 8, 1997

Personal details
- Born: November 14, 1945 (age 81) Ruhengeri, Rwanda
- Citizenship: Rwanda, Uganda
- Spouse: Harriet (m. December 20, 1969)
- Children: 5
- Education: Bishop Tucker Theological College; Makerere University; Trinity Episcopal School for Ministry

John Kabango Rucyahana (roo-CHAH-ha-na) (born 14 November 1945) is a Rwandan Anglican bishop. He was bishop of Shyira in the Anglican Church of Rwanda from 1997 to 2010. After retiring as bishop, he was appointed president of Rwanda's National Unity and Reconciliation Commission (NURC).

Rucyahana was born in Rwanda to a Tutsi family. He fled Rwanda as a teenager, first to neighboring Congo and then to Uganda. He settled in Uganda, married and became an Anglican priest. As a priest, he pursued theological studies in the United States, where he befriended Christian leaders, and built an orphanage with support from U.S. donors. After the 1994 Rwandan genocide was ended, Rucyahana was invited to return and help rebuild the Anglican Church there. He was elected bishop of Shyira in 1997, and his episcopacy focused on rebuilding physical infrastructure in the diocese—including the cathedral, schools and healthcare facilities—and in promoting reconciliation between genocide perpetrators and survivors. For his work on reconciliation, Rucyahana received the William Wilberforce Award from Prison Fellowship.

Rucyahana was also a major player in the worldwide Anglican realignment. He opposed the growth of liberal theology in the Episcopal Church in the United States and argued against it at the 1998 Lambeth Conference. When a group of laypeople sought to plant a church without the approval of their local Episcopal bishop, the planting priest's orders were transferred to Rucyahana's diocese, and Rucyahana was present for the consecration outside the Episcopal Church of American priests to serve as bishops inside the United States. This became the first development in what eventually became the Anglican Mission in America.

After retiring as bishop, Rucyahana was appointed by President Paul Kagame to head the country's National United and Reconciliation Commission. Rucyahana held this role until 2021, when the NURC's functions were absorbed by a new government ministry. Rucyahana's political activities were scrutinised by the United Nations, which issued a series of reports that said he had attempted to mobilize support for the M23 rebellion in the Democratic Republic of the Congo. Rucyahana denied raising funds for M23.

== Early life, family and education ==
Rucyahana was born in Ruhengeri, Rwanda in 1945, into a Tutsi family who lived near the Ugandan border. During the 1959 revolution, Rucyahana's parents fled to Uganda, while he remained in boarding school. Rucyahana fled Rwanda to the Congo, where his parents had migrated, in 1962. They fled the Kwilu rebellion in 1964 and returned to Uganda, where Rucyahana converted to Christianity in 1966.

Rucyahana married his wife, Harriet, in 1969; the wedding was performed by Rucyahana's close friend Emmanuel Kolini, the future archbishop of Rwanda. The Rucyahanas had five children and adopted four more from his late brother's family. In Uganda, Rucyahana worked as a teacher and trained as an evangelist under Bishop of Kigezi Dick Lyth. In 1972 he enrolled in Bishop Tucker Theological College, and was ordained a deacon in 1974 and a priest in 1975.

== Ordained ministry in Uganda ==
Rucyahana served as a parish priest in the Church of Uganda. He has said that he was threatened with arrest by forces supporting Idi Amin during Amin's fall. In 1983, he was awarded a diploma in theology by Makerere University. From 1983 to 1987, Rucyahana was an archdeacon in the Diocese of Bunyoro. In 1988, he moved to the United States to pursue a master's degree at Trinity Episcopal School for Ministry. While at Trinity, he befriended future bishop Thad Barnum, then an Episcopal priest in the Pittsburgh area. In the United States, he made extensive contacts with Christians in several different denominations and became disillusioned with the Episcopal Church, the American branch of the Anglican Communion. He returned to Uganda as coordinator of missions and planning in Bunyoro.

Working with Barnum and U.S. donors, Rucyahana started an orphanage in Uganda known as Mustard Seed Babies Home in Hoima. He spent up to three months a year in the United States raising funds from churches and donors. Rucyahana received Ugandan citizenship.

== Episcopacy in Rwanda ==
Rucyahana returned to Rwanda after the 1994 genocide, which had claimed a majority of his family members. He first returned to Rwanda on a Church of Uganda mission in August 1994, shortly after the genocide had been ended by the Rwandan Patriotic Front (RPF) seizing control of the country. In 1995, he and Kolini served on a fact-finding team for the Consortium of Anglican Provinces of Africa to determine the role of the Anglican Church in the genocide and propose a plan to rebuild the church. Then-Vice President Paul Kagame urged Rucyahana to return to Rwanda, and he was appointed diocesan secretary in Shyira. He and Kolini initiated a series of renewal conferences for clergy and recommended that the episcopal sees held by exiled bishops be declared vacant. Rucyahana was elected to the vacant see of Shyira, in northwestern Rwanda, in spring of 1997 and consecrated on June 8, 1997.

The early years of Rucyahana's episcopacy were filled with frequent death threats and violence from rebel forces. (Shortly after his consecration, his 16-year-old niece was targeted by rebels, kidnapped, gang raped and flayed before being killed.) As bishop, he oversaw the construction of Sonrise School in Musanze (2002), the construction of a new cathedral (2004) and the reopening of diocesan hospitals. He fundraised in the United States for Sonrise School, which was intended to serve children orphaned by war and AIDS. By 2011, orphans comprised three-fourths of Sonrise School's student body. During his episcopacy, the diocese launched the Urwego Opportunity Bank and built approximately 600 housing units for returning refugees. He was also chair of Prison Fellowship Rwanda.

Rucyahana was heavily involved in reconciliation efforts between genocide victims and perpetrators. He acknowledged the great difficulty many survivors of the genocide had in rebuilding relationships with perpetrators, many of whom still lived in their communities, and he personally arranged meetings between confessed murderers and the family members of their victims. In 1997, Rwandan jails held 125,000 people who had been arrested for genocide-related crimes. Rucyahana worked with government officials to launch programs of repentance, forgiveness, restitution and reconciliation within prisons. In 2009, Rucyahana received the William Wilberforce Award from Prison Fellowship for the Umuvumu Tree Project, which provided imprisoned perpetrators of the genocide opportunities to confess their crimes and ask for forgiveness from victims. Within six months of the Umuvumu Tree Project starting in 2002, 32,000 prisoners had confessed their crimes. Restitution efforts included released perpetrators rebuilding houses for survivors and victims. According to Voice of America, "[i]nternational human rights groups say Rucyahana is largely responsible for creating a new movement of hope in his country."

He retired as bishop of Shyira upon reaching the retirement age of 65 and was succeeded by Laurent Mbanda.

== Anglican realignment ==
Rucyahana strongly opposed developments in the theology and doctrine of the Episcopal Church toward the ordination of openly non-celibate homosexual priests. In 1998, when a group of theologically conservative Episcopalians in Little Rock, Arkansas, began to explore planting a church called St. Andrew's without the support of Bishop of Arkansas Larry Maze. The congregation decided to call South Carolina priest T.J. Johnston as its first rector, but Maze refused to license Johnston to serve in his diocese. South Carolina Bishop Ed Salmon issued letters dimissory transferring Johnston's canonical residence to Rucyahana's Diocese of Shyira. This process was described by anthropologist Miranda Hassett as a "loophole in Anglican polity to escape the authority of the Episcopal Church and its bishops." This "loophole" was closed, and subsequent priests to leave the Episcopal Church for Rwanda and other provinces providing oversight to dissident U.S. and Canadian Anglicans either voluntarily renounced their orders or were inhibited and deposed.

The issue eventually became a flashpoint at the 1998 Lambeth Conference, where TEC Presiding Bishop Frank Griswold and Maze met with Kolini and Rucyahana to head off further disputes. In a letter to Kolini, Griswold reminded him of Lambeth's 1988 resolution on the integrity of diocesan boundaries and asked the primate "to make clear to Bishop Rucyahana that his current plan is most unwise and harmful." Archbishop of Canterbury George Carey also interceded with both sides. While at Lambeth, Rucyahana met Archbishop of South East Asia Moses Tay and agreed to coordinate on the realignment strategy.

In 1999, Rucyahana was part of a delegation of Anglicans from the Global South who visited the United States to evaluate the Episcopal Church at Griswold's invitation. Rucyahana concluded that many Episcopal clergy had rejected the authority of the Bible, that most clergy did not believe the resolutions of the 1998 Lambeth Conference were binding, that ordinations of gay clergy and blessings of same-sex unions would continue, and that John Shelby Spong would not be disciplined for his views. He recommended to Kolini that the Anglican Church of Rwanda break communion with the Episcopal Church and establish a "missionary district" in U.S. territory. In 2000 in Singapore, Rucyahana joined Kolini, Tay and three other bishops in co-consecrating Chuck Murphy and John Rodgers to serve as bishops for what would later that year become known as the Anglican Mission in America.

== Political activities ==
In 2010, Rucyahana was appointed by Kagame as president of the country's National Unity and Reconciliation Commission (NURC). "Working towards reconciliation is the whole purpose of Jesus Christ who came to reconcile us with God," he said at the time. In 2016, the NURC released survey results stating that more than 92% of Rwandans believed unity and reconciliation had been achieved. The NURC was phased out in 2021 when its functions were absorbed by the newly created Ministry of National Unity and Civic Engagement.

In 2012 and 2013, the United Nations Group of Experts on the Democratic Republic of the Congo submitted a series of reports to the UN Security Council. The reports said that Rucyahana is a member of the RPF, that Rucyahana convened a meeting in May 2012 to convey Rwandan government support for the M23 rebellion, and that he attempted to mobilize support for M23 from within Rwanda. Rucyahana denied raising funds for M23. He issued a public letter calling the charges false and said that he was not an RPF member.

In 2016, Rucyahana praised Kagame's decision to run for re-election as "yet another source of joy as people celebrate the New Year".

== Bibliography ==
- Rucyahana, John; Riordan, James (2007). The Bishop of Rwanda: Finding Forgiveness Amidst a Pile of Bones. Nashville, Tennessee: Thomas Nelson. ISBN 0849900522.

== Notes ==
=== Sources ===
- Barnum, Thaddeus (2008). Never Silent: How Third World Missionaries Are Now Bringing the Gospel to the U.S. Colorado Springs, Colorado: Eleison Publishing. ISBN 978-0-615-20694-3.
- Byishimo, Bertrand (July 15, 2021). "New ministry to deepen national unity: Officials". The New Times.
- Hassett, Miranda K. (2009). Anglican Communion in Crisis How Episcopal Dissidents and Their African Allies Are Reshaping Anglicanism. Princeton University Press. ISBN 9781400827718.
- Kagire, Edmund (September 21, 2021). "CNLG, NURC, FARG, National Itorero Commission Phased Out, In Comes MINUBUMWE". KT PRESS.
- Karuhanga, James (April 3, 2010). "Rucyahana ready for NURC challenge". The New Times.
- Kinzer, Stephen (2008), A Thousand Hills: Rwanda's Rebirth and the Man Who Dreamed It, Wiley, ISBN 978-0-470-12015-6
- Larson, Catherine Claire (2009). As We Forgive: Stories of Reconciliation from Rwanda. Grand Rapids, Michigan: Zondervan. ISBN 978-0-310-28730-8.
- Levenick, Christopher (Winter 2012). "Lending a Hand". Philanthropy Magazine.
- Manson, Katrina (6 April 2014). "Rwandan genocide: Lingering legacy". Financial Times.
- Musoni, Edwin (January 26, 2009). "Rucyahana receives Wilberforce Award". The New Times.
- Myers, Sondra (December 16, 2011). "Interview with Bishop John Rucyahana". The New Times.
- Opobo, Moses (March 7, 2015). "Rucyahana: Anglican Primate blending politics with the Gospel to heal nation". The New Times.
- Rucyahana, John; Riordan, James (2007). The Bishop of Rwanda: Finding Forgiveness Amidst a Pile of Bones. Nashville, Tennessee: Thomas Nelson. ISBN 0849900522.
- Rwirahira, Rodrigue (January 28, 2016). "At least 92% of Rwandans reconciled, says new survey". The New Times.
- Taylor, Darren (November 1, 2009). "Cleric Sees New Humanity Emerging in Rwanda After Genocide". Voice of America.
