= Jonathan Ruhumuliza =

Rwandan retired Anglican bishop (born 1956)

- Bishop of Cameroon
- Church: Church of the Province of West Africa
- Diocese: Diocese of Cameroon
- In office: 1998–2004
- Other posts: Assistant Bishop of Butare (1991–1992); Provincial Secretary, Province of the Anglican Church of Rwanda (1992–1993); Assistant Bishop of Kigali (1993); Coadjutor Bishop of Kigali (1993–1995); Bishop of Kigali (1995–1997); Honorary assistant bishop, Diocese of Worcester (2005–present)

Orders
- Ordination: 1982 (deacon); 1983 (priest)
- Consecration: 1991

Personal details
- Born: 1956 (age 69–70)
- Denomination: Anglican
- Education: Butare Theological School

Jonathan Ruhumuliza (born 1956) is a Rwandan retired Anglican bishop, who served as Bishop of Kigali and Bishop of Cameroon. He is currently a parish priest in the Church of England.

== Biography ==
Ruhumuliza trained for the priesthood at Butare Theological School, Rwanda, was ordained a deacon in 1982 and a priest in 1983 and served as curate of Kigeme, Rwanda, until 1984. He then became Manager and Chaplain at Kigeme High School (1983–1986) before attending Makumira University College (Arusha, Tanzania), graduating with a Bachelor of Divinity (BD) in 1989. He took on the Manager and Chaplain roles at Kigeme Hospital (1989–1990) then returned to his old High School jobs (1990–1991).

Consecrated in 1991, Ruhumuliza served as Assistant Bishop of Butare until 1992 and as Provincial Secretary for the Province of the Anglican Church of Rwanda (1992–1993). In 1993, he became Assistant Bishop of Kigali and Coadjutor Bishop of Kigali.

After the genocide began in April 1994, Ruhumuliza is accused of siding with the Hutu extremist government that organised the genocide of about 800,000 Tutsis.

In May 1994, Ruhumuliza wrote to the secretary general of the All Africa Conference of Churches, Jose Chipenda, defending the government and blaming the mass killings on its opponents, the Rwandan Patriotic Front. Ruhumuliza wrote that the Rwandan prime minister, Jean Kambanda, and members of his cabinet were touring Rwanda to appeal for unity and peace when in fact they were whipping up the killing. Kambanda and several members of his cabinet were subsequently convicted of genocide by the International Criminal Tribunal for Rwanda.

In June 1994, Ruhumuliza and the Anglican archbishop of Rwanda, Augustin Nshamihigo, held a press conference in Kenya in which they claimed the RPF was leading the massacres and that the government was attempting to stop the killing.

Human Rights Watch described Ruhumuliza as an apologist for genocide: "Far from condemning the attempt to exterminate the Tutsi, Archbishop Augustin Nshamihigo and Bishop Jonathan Ruhumuliza of the Anglican church acted as spokesmen for the genocidal government at a press conference in Nairobi. Like many who tried to explain away the slaughter, they placed the blame for the genocide on the RPF because it had attacked Rwanda. Foreign journalists were so disgusted at this presentation that they left the conference.

Nshamihigo's successor as archbishop, Emmanuel Kolini, accused Ruhumuliza of collaborating with the Hutu extremist government as an "errand boy" and described the Anglican church in Rwanda during the genocide as "corrupt".

African Rights accused Ruhumuliza of refusing shelter to Tutsis who were facing imminent death. It said he worked in collaboration with another Anglican bishop, Samuel Musabyimana, who was later charged with genocide by the International Criminal Tribunal for Rwanda but died before trial. African Rights said Ruhumuliza failed to attempt to save people after another Anglican bishop, Adoniya Sebununguri, called a group of Tutsis "wicked people" who deserved to be killed.

Ruhumuliza was appointed diocesan Bishop of Kigali in 1995 but faced calls from other Anglican clergy for an investigation into his actions.

In 1996, he apologised for not speaking out strongly enough against the massacres and asked for forgiveness "because I did not continue to energetically condemn either the tragedy which was in progress or the state communiqués which were broadcast on the radios during this time".

In 1997 Ruhumuliza moved to Canada. From 1998 until 2004, he was the diocesan Bishop of Cameroon in the Church of the Province of West Africa.

Following the resignation of his See, Ruhumuliza moved to the United Kingdom, taking on posts as an assistant parish priest in the Diocese of Worcester, where has been licensed as an honorary assistant bishop since 2005. He was first Assistant Minister in the Droitwich Spa Team Ministry until 2006 and was a curate in Elmley Lovett with Hampton Lovett and Elmbridge &c., in Ombersley with Doverdale, and in Hartlebury from 2012. He lives in Droitwich and has had permission to officiate in the neighbouring Diocese of Birmingham since 2013. In April 2020, Ruhumuliza was appointed Interim non-stipendiary Assistant Curate (Interim Minister) of Astley, Tyldesley and Mosley Common in the Diocese of Manchester.

In 2014, following a report in The Observer on Ruhumuliza, Worcester diocese made a statement saying "No evidence was found of complicity in the Rwandan genocide" when he was first appointed in 2005.

The Church of England said it was not fully aware of the "disturbing" accusations against Ruhumuliza. He was placed on "special leave" by mutual agreement. The Church of England said it had launched an investigation but did not publicly announce the results.

Ibuka, the genocide survivors' association in Rwanda, criticised the Church of England for failing to scrutinise Ruhumuliza's past closely enough.
