= John Rodgers (theologian) =

American Anglican theologian (1930–2022)

The Right Reverend John H. Rodgers Jr.
- Dean and President Emeritus, Trinity School for Ministry
- Church: Anglican Church of Rwanda; Anglican Church in North America
- Previous post(s): Missionary Bishop, Anglican Mission in America

Orders
- Consecration: January 29, 2000 by Emmanuel Kolini

Personal details
- Born: June 13, 1930; St. Louis, Missouri
- Died: November 23, 2022 (aged 92); Pittsburgh, Pennsylvania
- Spouse: Blanche Kostka (m. 1959; died 2020)

John Hewitt Rodgers Jr. (1930–2022) was an American Anglican theologian and bishop. The author of multiple commentaries on the Thirty-Nine Articles of Religion, he was a founding faculty member at Trinity School for Ministry and served as its dean and president from 1978 to 1990. In 2000, he played a role in the global Anglican realignment when he was consecrated as a bishop of the Anglican Church of Rwanda to oversee congregations in North America through the Anglican Mission in America.

== Early life and education ==
Rodgers was born in St. Louis in 1930 to John H. Rodgers Sr. and Amanda Hancock Rich. Raised Presbyterian, he was confirmed in the Episcopal Church as a teenager. Rodgers graduated from the U.S. Naval Academy and served in the U.S. Marine Corps in Okinawa prior to his calling to ordained ministry. After receiving an M.Div. from Virginia Theological Seminary, Rodgers served at an Episcopal parish in Washington, D.C., where he met his future wife, Blanche Kostka. They married in 1959 and had four children. Rodgers then moved to Switzerland, where he earned a Th.D. from the University of Basel while studying under theologian Karl Barth. His early research was on the work of Scottish theologian P. T. Forsyth.

== Academic career ==
Rodgers returned to VTS as a professor of systematic theology in 1963 and spent 13 years there, becoming "known throughout the Anglican Communion as one of its foremost Evangelical theologians," according to the Pittsburgh Post-Gazette. Rodgers also became a voice for theological conservatism within the Episcopal Church. In 1976, he left VTS to become the first senior professor at Trinity Episcopal School for Ministry in Ambridge, Pennsylvania, a new seminary born out of the evangelical and charismatic renewal movements in the Episcopal Church. In 1978, he succeeded founding dean Alfred Stanway as dean and president of Trinity.

According to Mark Michael, "Rodgers led Trinity through a season of dramatic growth, molding it into a bastion of conservative evangelical thought, as exemplified by his most important work, The Faith of Anglicans, a massive commentary on the Thirty-Nine Articles. Rodgers was also a firm supporter of the charismatic movement, and an outspoken advocate for orthodoxy in the Episcopal Church, especially in matters of human sexuality." Rodgers' commentary on the Articles was "conceived . . . as a catechetical tool," according to Oliver O'Donovan. "[I]f you want to understand what the core issues of Christian principle are, pick up Rodgers."

Rodgers also served as a leader in the ecumenical dialogues that led to the intercommunion agreement between the Episcopal Church and the Evangelical Lutheran Church in America.

Rodgers remained on the Trinity faculty until 2000 and served as rector of St. Stephen's Church, Sewickley, for a short time in the early 1990s.

== Anglican realignment ==
As a member of the evangelical wing of the Episcopal Church, Rodgers opposed theological liberalizing trends in the broader church. He was an opponent of the ordination of women to the priesthood, and he resisted non-gendered alternative liturgical texts in the 1990s as "linguistically awkward . . . at best, and theologically erroneous at worst." At the 1991 General Convention, Rodgers as a delegate from the Diocese of Pittsburgh said that he and others "remain seated in this convention as loyal Episcopalians under protest and in order to protest. . . . in the light of this House's unwillingness to affirm biblical and classical Anglican sexual morality as having canonical standing in our church."

In 1996, Rodgers drafted a statement for the American Anglican Council entitled "A Place to Stand, a Call to Mission." The statement summarized "a common confession of the Gospel" and outlined several "contemporary implications" on contested issues like the uniqueness of Jesus Christ, church and state relations, abortion, euthanasia, racial inclusion, same-sex marriage, divorce, and human sexuality. It concluded that "[w]When teachings and practices contrary to Scripture and to this orthodox Anglican inheritance are permitted within the Church—or even authorized by conventions or synods—we, in obedience to God, will disassociate ourselves from those specific teachings and practices and will respond with biblical correction in grace and truth." This statement became the forerunner of the Jerusalem Declaration adopted at the Global Anglican Future Conference in 2008 and was also the root of the "First Promise" movement in the Episcopal Church.

In September 1997, a group of conservative Episcopal priests signed what became known as the "First Promise" statement. The statement declared the authority of the Episcopal Church and its General Convention to be "fundamentally impaired" because they no longer upheld the "truth of the gospel". In 1999, the First Promise signers nominated Rodgers as a potential bishop for oversight of conservative Anglicans in the Episcopal Church.

In 2000, the First Promise statement evolved into the Anglican Mission in America, which would separate from the Episcopal Church. First Promise leader and South Carolina Episcopal priest Chuck Murphy and Rodgers were made bishops by Emmanuel Kolini and Moses Tay at a January 31, 2000, service in Singapore. In doing so, Murphy and Rodgers left the Episcopal Church and founded the AMIA with canonical residence in the Anglican Church of Rwanda. According to anthropologist Miranda Hassett, "[t]he consecrations allowed AMiA members to make a strong claim to continued legitimate membership in the Anglican Communion through their connections with Anglican bishops from outside the United States."

== Later life ==
Rodgers was largely retired for most of the 2000s and 2010s, working on his commentaries on the Articles of Religion, although he served as interim dean and president of Trinity School for Ministry in 2007. He was a member of the Anglican Church in North America's College of Bishops at the time of his death, which came from old age on November 23, 2022, in Pittsburgh.

== Bibliography ==
- Rodgers, John H. (1965). The Theology of P. T. Forsyth: The Cross of Christ and the Revelation of God. London: Independent Press.
- Rodgers, John H. (2003). A Report of the Study Concerning the Ordination of Women Undertaken by the Anglican Mission in America (PDF). Pawleys Island, South Carolina: Anglican Mission in America.
- Rodgers, John H. (2011). Essential Truths for Christians: A Commentary on the Anglican Thirty-Nine Articles and an Introduction to Systematic Theology. Blue Bell, Pennsylvania: Classical Anglican Press. ISBN 9781893293595.
- Rodgers, John H. (2015). The 39 Articles of Religion: A Commentary with Introduction to Systematic Theology (e-book) (2nd ed.). Huntington Beach, California: Anglican House Publishers. ISBN 978-0-9860441-8-2.
- Rodgers, John H. (2021). The Faith of Anglicans. Huntington Beach, California: Anglican House Publishers. ISBN 9781737691303.
- Rodgers, John H.; Noll, Stephen (2021). Zoom Memoirs. Huntington Beach, California: Anglican House Publishers. ISBN 978-1-7359022-7-2.
- Rodgers, John H. (2022). A Short Course. Huntington Beach, California: Anglican House Publishers. ISBN 978-1-7376913-6-5.

Academic offices
Preceded by Alfred Stanway	Dean and President, Trinity Episcopal School for Ministry; 1978–1990	Succeeded by William C. Frey
