= Diocese of Kigali =

Diocese of Kigali may refer to:

- Anglican Diocese of Kigali
- Roman Catholic Archdiocese of Kigali
