= Anglican Diocese of Kigali =

Anglican diocese in Rwanda

Diocese of Kigali Diyosezi y'Abangilikani ya Kigali

Location
- Country: Rwanda
- Territory: Kigali, Bugesera, Rwamagana
- Archdeaconries: 8

Statistics
- Parishes: 42
- Churches: 192
- Schools: 40

Information
- Rite: Anglican
- Cathedral: St. Etienne Cathedral
- Language: Kinyarwanda, French, English

Current leadership
- Bishop: Nathan Amooti Rusengo

Website
- kigalidiocese.rw

The Anglican Diocese of Kigali is one of 13 dioceses in the Anglican Church of Rwanda. It is the oldest diocese in the church, dating to 1966.

== History ==
Originally covering all of Rwanda as part of an ecclesiastical province encompassing newly independent Rwanda, Burundi and eastern Zaire, the original diocese was divided several times to produce the current boundaries, which encompass the southern and central areas of Kigali and the districts of Bugesera to the south and Rwamagana to the east.

== Bishops ==
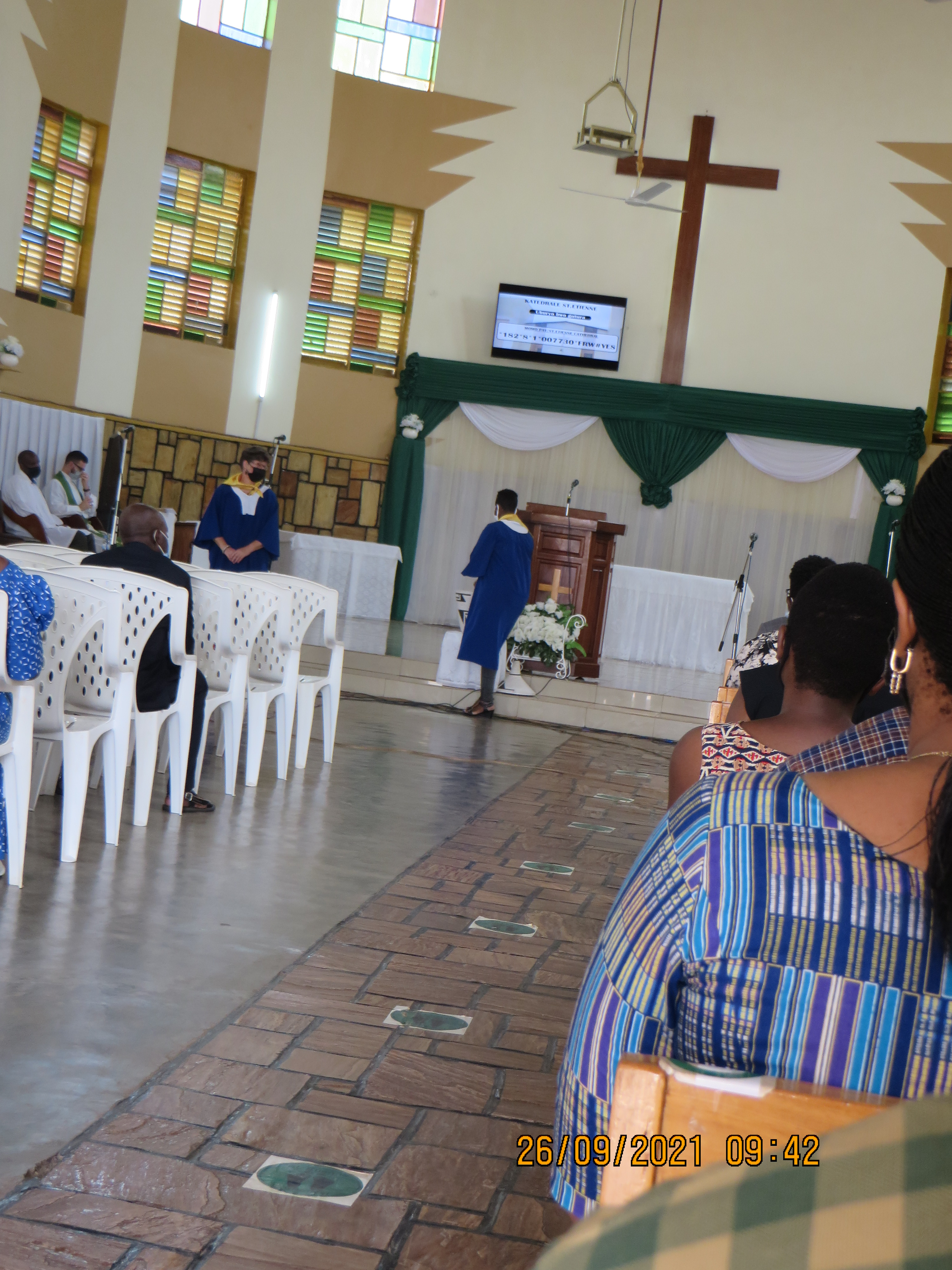
A service in St. Etienne Cathedral, the seat of the bishop of Kigali.

Since 1966, the bishops who have led this diocese have been:

1. Adoniya Sebununguri (1966–1992)
2. Augustin Nshamihigo (1992–1995)
3. Jonathan Ruhumuliza (1995–1997)
  * Vacant (1997–1998)
4. Emmanuel Kolini (1998–2011)
5. Louis Muvunyi (2011–2019)
6. Nathan Rusengo (2019–present)

== Education ==
The diocese operates 40 nursery, primary, secondary and vocational schools staffed by 400 teachers and serving 26,000 students.

The Diocese of Kigali also maintains an archive documenting the history of Anglicanism in Rwanda. Stored in 200 binders, the archive includes material in French, English and Kinyarwanda starting in the 1940s, including minutes of Mothers’ Union meetings, church-state correspondence, parish reports and documents on the EAR's role in post-genocide reconciliation. The project was supported in part by Kigali's then-companion diocese, Ely in England.

== Companion diocese ==
The Diocese of Winchester in the Church of England
