= Bryan Hollon =

American theologian and academic administrator

The Very Reverend Canon Bryan Hollon

Dean and President of Trinity Anglican Seminary
- Incumbent
- Assumed office 2022
- Preceded by: Henry L. "Laurie" Thompson

Academic background
- Education: Baylor University (B.A., Ph.D.); Fuller Theological Seminary (M.Div.)
- Thesis: Ontology, exegesis, and culture in the thought of Henri de Lubac (2006)
- Doctoral advisor: Barry Harvey

Academic work
- Discipline: Theology
- Institutions: Malone University; Trinity Anglican Seminary
- Notable works: Everything is Sacred: Spiritual Exegesis in the Political Theology of Henri de Lubac

Ecclesiastical career
- Religion: Christianity (Anglican)
- Church: Anglican Church in North America
- Ordained: 2015 (priesthood)

Bryan C. Hollon is an American theologian and academic administrator. Since 2022, he has been the eighth dean and president of Trinity Anglican Seminary, where he has focused the seminary on a mission of training clergy for the Anglican Church in North America (ACNA). He previously taught for 16 years at Malone University. As a theologian, Hollon specialized in Ressourcement theology, in particular the work of French Jesuit Henri de Lubac, about whom he published Everything is Sacred: Spiritual Exegesis in the Political Theology of Henri de Lubac. Hollon became an ACNA priest in 2015 and has served as a canon theologian and church planter in the ACNA. He has been active in education and spiritual formation for laypeople in addition to seminarians.

== Early life, education and family ==
Hollon grew up in Weslaco, Texas, and was raised in the Disciples of Christ. He received his undergraduate degree in 1991 from Baylor University, where he met his future wife, Suzanne. They were married in 1993 and have three adult children. Hollon received his master of divinity from Fuller Theological Seminary in 2001 and his Ph.D. in religion in 2006 from Baylor, where he focused on the Ressourcement movement in 20th-century theology and wrote his dissertation on the thought of Henri de Lubac.

== Theological work ==
Hollon was a professor of theology at Malone University in Canton, Ohio, from 2006 to 2022. He was chair of the Society of Anglican Theologians and co-editor of a book series for Wipf and Stock imprint Cascade Books on Protestant sacramental theology.

He published his dissertation as the book Everything is Sacred: Spiritual Exegesis in the Political Theology of Henri de Lubac in 2009. The book placed de Lubac in the context of postliberal theologians such as Hans Frei, George Lindbeck and John Milbank in defending de Lubac's hermeneutics. In a review essay of several books on de Lubac, Hans Boersma said Hollon sought to retrieve de Lubac's spiritual interpretation and "Christological mysticism". David Grumett added that Hollon took a different approach from other de Lubac studies by focusing on "his spiritual exegesis and its socio-political implications". According to Grumett, de Lubac doubted the relevance of spiritual exegesis, but Hollon showed "the importance of the allegorical sensibility for precluding the possibility that scripture absorbs the world". According to a review by David Ney, Hollon "threaten[ed] to exclude theologies of political engagement" like de Lubac's, thus "miss[ing] entirely the point that de Lubac’s active participation in la Résistance could have cost him his life". Boersma praised the book as "eminently accessible".

== Pastoral ministry ==
Hollon encountered Anglicanism through a short-lived 1928 Book of Common Prayer church plant. He was ordained as a priest in the Anglican Church in North America in 2015. He was canon theologian in the Anglican Diocese of the Great Lakes, and he planted St. John's Anglican Church in Canton and served as its priest for four years until the congregation called a rector in 2021.

Hollon was director of the Northeast Ohio program of the C.S. Lewis Institute, a program focused on lay education, and he became concerned about the "thinness" of catechesis for laypeople in churches. Amid the growth of conspiracy theories, such as QAnon, among evangelical Christians in the 2020s, he also described belief in conspiracies as "a serious and widespread problem" and advised clergy to address the problem "from the pulpit . . . [i]dentify[ing] conspiracy theories like QAnon by name, and provid[ing] clear information explaining why these conspiracies are false".

== Dean and president of Trinity ==
In 2022, Hollon was named the eighth dean and president of Trinity School for Ministry in Ambridge, Pennsylvania. He succeeded the retiring Laurie Thompson. Under Hollon, in 2024 the seminary renamed itself Trinity Anglican Seminary, linking the school to its denominational identity at a time when other seminaries were shedding denominational markers.

Shortly before Hollon's arrival, the seminary had dropped its legacy affiliation with the Episcopal Church, losing about 30 percent of its donor base in the transition. Under Hollon, the seminary's primary purpose became to serve the clergy formation needs of the ACNA, including liturgical formation for a church that includes many candidates for ordained ministry from non-Anglican backgrounds. Hollon renewed the seminary's focus on formation through the Daily Office in chapel services and opened the Trophimus Center, a new chapel and event center, in 2025. The Trophimus Center hosted the ACNA's provincial council in 2025. Trinity also created the Anglican Formation Network to promote collaboration among seminaries, study centers, faculty and students in the ACNA. In 2025, the Lilly Endowment awarded Trinity a nearly $10 million grant for the Anglican Formation Network.

== Selected works ==
- Hollon, Bryan C. (2009). Everything Is Sacred: Spiritual Exegesis in the Political Theology of Henri de Lubac. Cascade Books. ISBN 978-1-55635-857-9.
- Hollon, Bryan (2003). "History, Authority, and Interpretation: A Theology of Scripture". Quodlibet. 5 (4).
- Hollon, Bryan C. (2006). "Is the Epistle to Diognetus an apology?". The Journal of Communication and Religion. 29 (1). Philosophy Documentation Center: 127–146. doi:10.5840/jcr20062916. ISSN 0894-2838.
- Hollon, Bryan C. (2011). "Knowledge of God as Assimilation and Participation: An Essay on Theological Pedagogy in the Light of Biblical Epistemology". Perspectives in Religious Studies. 38 (1): 85–106.
