= Trinity Anglican Seminary =

Evangelical Anglican seminary in Pennsylvania

Coordinates: 40°35′37″N 80°13′48″W

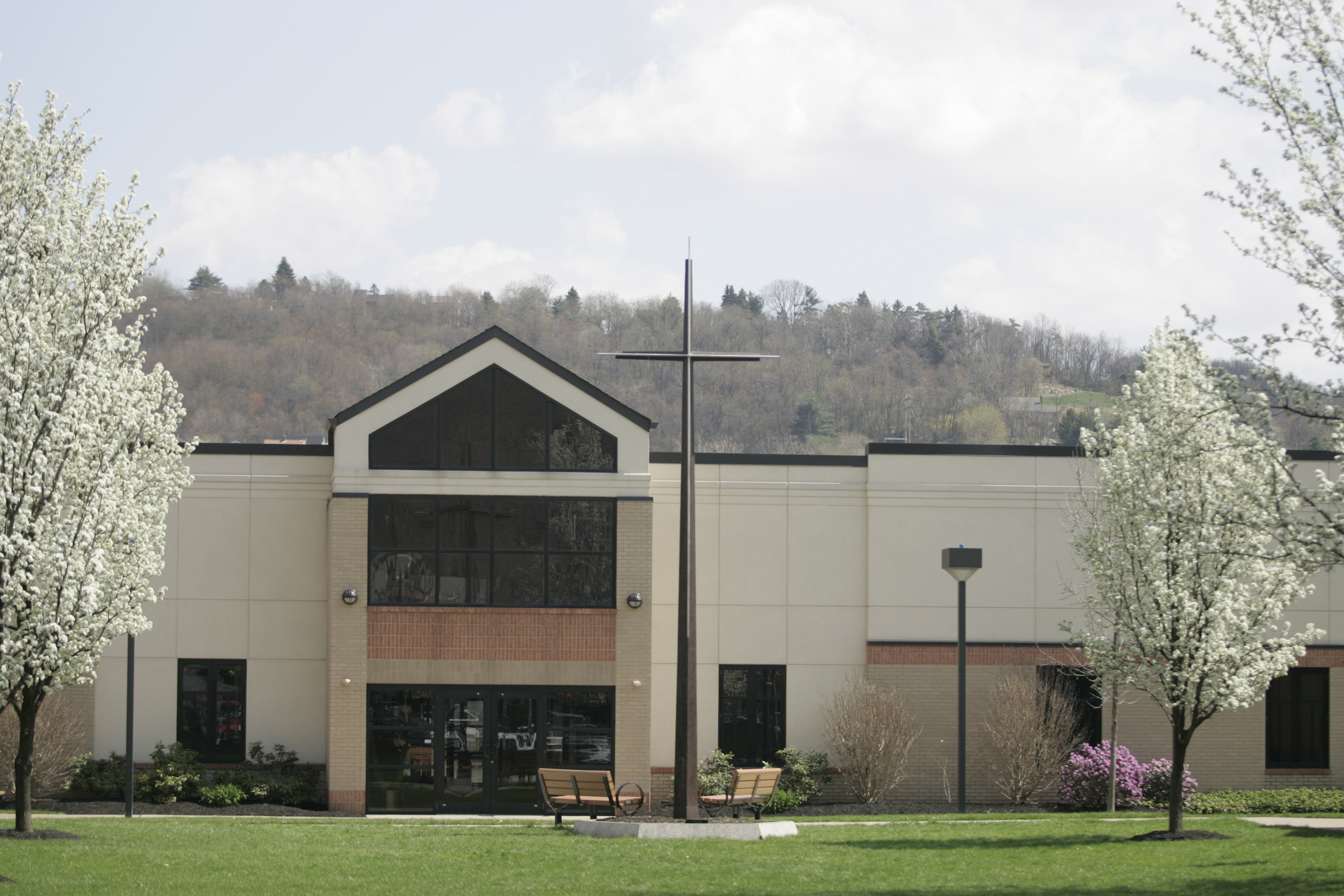
- Type: Private seminary
- Established: 1975
- Religious affiliation: Anglican
- President: Bryan C. Hollon
- Faculty: 15
- Administrative staff: 25
- Students: 152
- Location: Ambridge, Pennsylvania, United States
- Campus: Small Town
- Colors: Blue and Gold
- Nickname: Kneelers
- Website: www.tas.edu

Trinity Anglican Seminary, (TAS) formerly known as Trinity Episcopal School for Ministry, is an Anglican seminary in Ambridge, Pennsylvania. It is generally associated with evangelical Anglicanism.

== History ==
In the mid 1970s, several prominent evangelical-leaning Episcopal clergy and lay leaders became disillusioned with what they considered the liberal theology and "theological relativism" of the existing Episcopal seminaries. Some members of this group had been involved with the charismatic movement that began in the mid-1960s in some parishes, while others, many associated with the Fellowship of Witness, held to a more traditional Anglican Evangelicalism. These advocates for conservatism in the Episcopal Church of the United States began to meet and plan a new seminary with a curriculum based on orthodox Protestant theology and evangelical principles.

In 1976, Alfred Stanway, a retired Australian missionary bishop to Tanganyika (present-day Tanzania), accepted the call to become the first dean. Beginning with 17 students and meeting in rented space, Trinity held its first classes in September 1976. Stanway served for two years before retiring. His successor, John Rodgers, oversaw major growth during his 12-year tenure. In 1989, William C. Frey resigned as Bishop of Colorado to become the third dean and president. In 1996, Peter C. Moore, a founding board member and noted evangelical leader, became the fourth dean and president. Paul F. M. Zahl was elected Trinity's fifth dean in 2004. He stepped down in May 2007, and Rodgers came out of retirement to serve as interim dean and president for one year. English evangelical Justyn Terry was named the school's dean in August 2008 and remained in office until returning to his homeland. He now serves as academic dean of Wycliffe Hall, Oxford, England. In May 2016 Laurie Thompson was asked to serve as the interim dean. Subsequently, the board invited Thompson to become the seventh dean and president. In May 2022, Thompson retired. On October 4, 2022 at St. Stephen's in Sewickley, Bryan C. Hollon was installed as the eighth Dean and president at Trinity.

In 2007, Trinity dropped the word "Episcopal" from its name on some of its publications and printed materials. The school's official name, however, remained unchanged. The modification was made in acknowledgment of the growing number of realigning Anglican bodies sending students to the seminary, including the Anglican Church in North America (ACNA), the Anglican Mission in the Americas, the Reformed Episcopal Church and the Convocation of Anglicans in North America, the latter two of which are sub-provinces of the ACNA (see Anglican realignment).

Trinity has "board members, faculty, staff, students and alumni on both sides" of movements to realign. Trinity remained, however, an independent institution, neither owned nor controlled by any diocese, parish or province. Trinity disaffiliated with The Episcopal Church in January 2022 and has since realigned with the ACNA, losing about 30 percent of its donor base in the transition.

In 2022, the seminary appointed Bryan Hollon as its eighth dean and president. In 2024 the seminary renamed itself Trinity Anglican Seminary, linking the school to its denominational identity at a time when other seminaries were shedding denominational markers. Under Hollon, the seminary's primary purpose became to serve the clergy formation needs of the ACNA and other churches in the Global Fellowship of Confessing Anglicans, including liturgical formation for a church that includes many candidates for ordained ministry from non-Anglican backgrounds. Hollon renewed the seminary's focus on formation through the Daily Office in chapel services and opened the Trophimus Center, a new chapel and event center in a former United Presbyterian church building, in 2025. The Trophimus Center hosted the ACNA's provincial council in 2025.

Trinity also created the Anglican Formation Network to promote collaboration among seminaries, study centers, faculty and students in the ACNA. In 2025, the Lilly Endowment awarded Trinity a nearly $10 million grant for the Anglican Formation Network.

== Evangelical leadership ==
Founded by leaders of the evangelical wing of the Episcopal Church, TAS has become a central player in the renewal movement in the Episcopal Church. The majority of its over 1,000 graduates who currently serve as clergy and lay leaders are evangelical. Some of the alumni, faculty, and trustees of the school have been among those who support conservative theology within the Episcopal Church, advocating historic views on matters such as the virgin birth, the deity of Jesus, and the literal resurrection of Jesus, as well as moral stances such as opposition to abortion and an affirmation of a traditional Christian view of marriage. Some of the graduates of this institution have assumed leadership positions within the Anglican realignment movement, been deposed by the Episcopal Church, and are now members of the Anglican Church in North America.

Although unquestionably evangelical, the seminary includes students, faculty, and staff from among evangelical, charismatic, and Anglo-Catholic wings of Anglicanism, as well as members of other conservative Christian denominations.

== Ecumenical relations ==
Although it is an Anglican seminary, Trinity Anglican Seminary is home to students from a wide variety of denominations. TAS maintains an M.Div. with a Presbyterian track, with students from the Evangelical Presbyterian Church. The North American Lutheran Seminary of the North American Lutheran Church has also been located at TAS since its founding in 2013.

== Academic information ==
TAS is accredited by the Association of Theological Schools in the United States and Canada and is a charter member of the Evangelical Council for Financial Accountability.

=== Degree programs ===
- Doctor of Ministry (D.Min.)
- Master of Divinity (M.Div.)
- Master of Arts in Religion (M.A.R.)
- Master of Sacred Theology (S.T.M.)

=== Diploma and certificate programs ===
- Diploma in Anglican Studies – available on campus or online
- Diploma in Christian Ministry – available on campus or online
- Certificate in Christian Ministry

== Notable alumni ==
=== Archbishops ===
- Benjamin Kwashi, GAFCON general secretary and archbishop of Jos in the Church of Nigeria
- Hector "Tito" Zavala, presiding bishop of the Anglican Church of South America and the Anglican Church of Chile

=== Bishops ===
- David Bryan, American bishop suffragan of the Anglican Diocese of the Carolinas
- Alex Farmer, American bishop of the Gulf Atlantic Diocese
- Daniel G. P. Gutierrez, American bishop of the Episcopal Diocese of Pennsylvania
- Jim Hobby, American bishop of the Anglican Diocese of Pittsburgh
- William H. Ilgenfritz, American bishop of the Missionary Diocese of All Saints
- Mark J. Lawrence, American bishop of the Episcopal Diocese of South Carolina
- David Lehmann, Canadian bishop of Caledonia
- John E. Miller III, American bishop in the Anglican Mission in the Americas and the Gulf Atlantic Diocese
- Samson Mwaluda, Tanzanian bishop of the Diocese of Taita–Taveta in the Anglican Church of Tanzania
- Jared Osborn, American-Canadian bishop suffragan in the Diocese of the Arctic
- Ryan Reed, American bishop of the Episcopal Diocese of Fort Worth (ACNA)
- John Rucyahana, Rwandan bishop of the Diocese of Shyria in the Anglican Church of Rwanda
- Scott Seely, American bishop suffragan in the Anglican Diocese of All Nations
- Jackson Sosthenes, Tanzanian bishop of the Diocese of Dar es Salaam in the Anglican Church of Tanzania
- Jeremiah Taama, Tanzanian bishop of the Diocese of Kajiado in the Anglican Church of Tanzania
- Steven Tighe, American bishop of the Anglican Diocese of the Southwest
- Christopher Warner, American bishop of the Anglican Diocese of the Mid-Atlantic
- Michael Williams, American bishop suffragan in the Jurisdiction of the Armed Forces and Chaplaincy
- Jacob Worley, American bishop of Cascadia
- Mark Zimmerman, American bishop of the Anglican Diocese of the Southwest

=== Other ===
- Ann B. Davis, American actress
- Julia Duin, American journalist
- Thomas McKenzie, American Anglican priest and author of The Anglican Way
- Rebecca Margaret Nyegenye, Ugandan cleric, provost of All Saints' Cathedral, Kampala

== Notable faculty ==
- Gregory Brewer was Bishop of the Episcopal Diocese of Central Florida.
- Paul House is associate dean and professor of divinity at Beeson Divinity School of Samford University.
- Terence Kelshaw served as Bishop of the Episcopal Diocese of the Rio Grande from 1989 until his retirement in 2005.
- William C. Frey, Dean and President, Trinity Episcopal School for Ministry, 1989–1996
- Grant LeMarquand was Area Bishop of the Horn of Africa
- David Mills is executive editor of the journal First Things.
- John H. Rodgers Jr. was dean and president from 1978 to 1990 and a major participant in the Anglican realignment as a bishop.
