= Laurent Mbanda =

Rwandan Anglican bishop (born 1954)

The Most Reverend Laurent Mbanda
- Chairman of the Global Anglican Council
- Church: Anglican Church of Rwanda
- Diocese: Gasabo
- In office: 2023–present
- Predecessor: Foley Beach
- Other posts: Primate of the Anglican Church of Rwanda and Bishop of Gasabo, 2018–2026; Bishop of Shyira, 2010–2018

Orders
- Consecration: May 2010 by Emmanuel Kolini

Personal details
- Born: October 25, 1954 (age 72)

Laurent Mbanda (born 25 October 1954) is a Rwandan Anglican bishop. He was the bishop of the Diocese of Shyira when he was elected the fourth archbishop and primate of the Province of the Anglican Church of Rwanda on 17 January 2018, being enthroned on 10 June 2018. He served as primate until his retirement in 2026. He has been chairman of the Global Anglican Council since 2023.

== Ecclesiastical career ==
He was born in Rwanda but spent a large part of his childhood in Burundi. He graduated at the Kenya Highlands Bible College, in Kericho, Kenya, before returning to Burundi, where he was ordained an Anglican priest. He moved to the United States in 1984, where he completed course work for an M.A. in Missiology at the Fuller Theological Seminary's School of World Missions, in Pasadena, United States, a Master of Arts in Christian Education at Denver Seminary and a PhD at Trinity International University, in Deerfield, Illinois.

He was consecrated Bishop of the Diocese of Shyira in March 2010. He was elected the fourth archbishop and primate of the Province of the Anglican Church of Rwanda on 17 January 2018, among five candidates, during the meeting the House of Bishops at St. Étienne Cathedral, in Kigali, and his enthronement took place on 10 June.

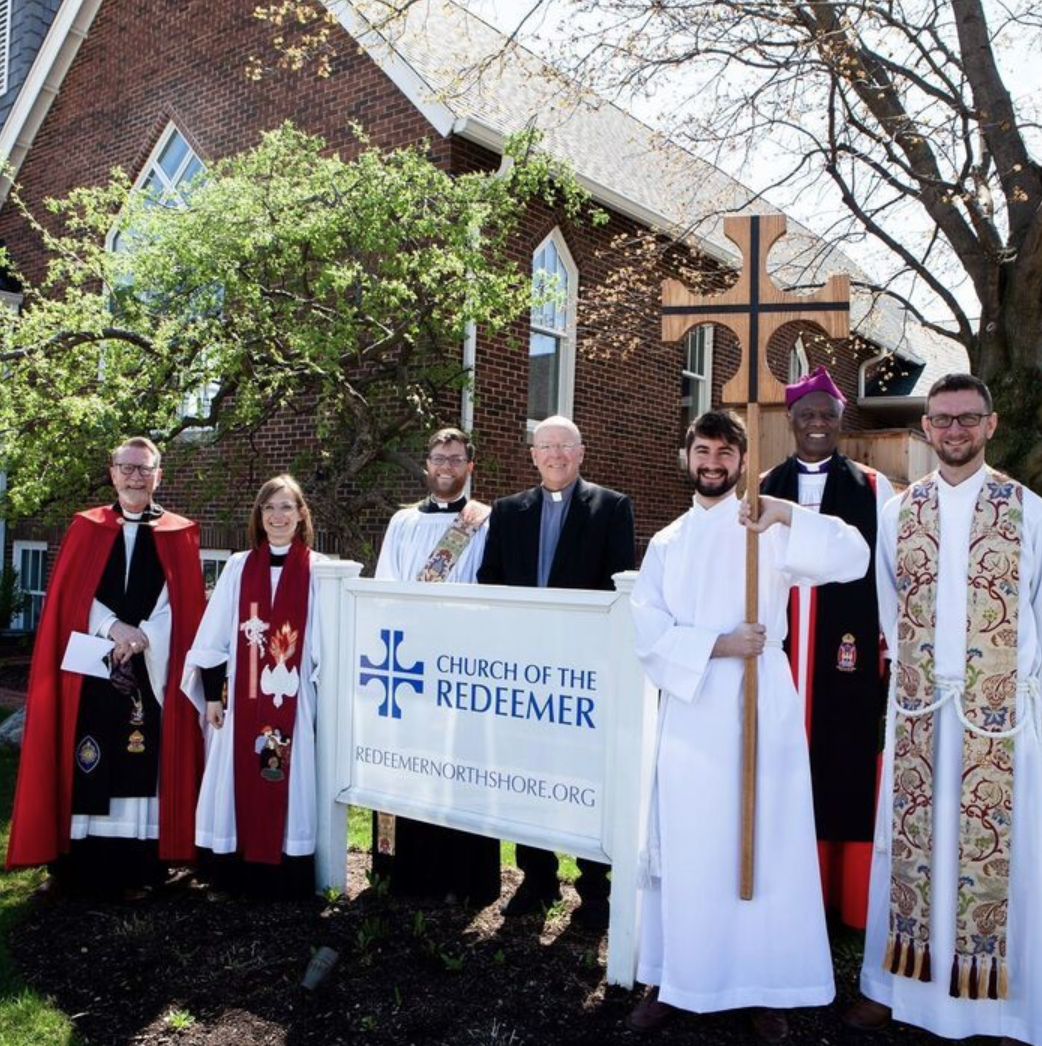
Archbishop of Rwanda Laurent Mbanda (second from right) consecrates the Church of the Redeemer (ACNA) in Highwood, Illinois, in 2019.

He has been a longtime supporter of GAFCON, since he attended the first Global Anglican Future Conference in Jerusalem in June 2008. He attended GAFCON III, in Jerusalem, from 17-22 June 2018. In 2019, Mbanda was elected vice chairman of the Global Fellowship of Confessing Anglicans. In April 2023, Mbanda hosted the fourth quinquennial GAFCON event in Kigali, at which he was elected chairman of the Primates Council of the Global Fellowship of Confessing Anglicans. In March 2026, at the G26 meeting in Abuja, Nigeria, Mbanda was elected the first Chair of the newly formed Global Anglican Council. In October 2026, Mbanda retired as primate (but remained as chairman of the Global Anglican Council; he was succeeded as primate by Manasseh Gahima.

He published Committed to Conflict: The Destruction of the Church in Rwanda (1997), co-written with Steve Wamberg, about the Rwandan genocide, and his autobiography, From Barefoot to Bishop (2017).

== Views on church-state relations in Rwanda ==
In his book Committed to Conflict Mbanda wrote:

The Hebraic model of theocracy, which would link spiritual leaders with political power, failed to become reality in Rwanda, but made a significant impact on the political leadership. Church leaders in Africa, and elsewhere, have to be careful to avoid combining religious and political functions. Church and mission leaders must watch the relationship between church and state, as these can be dangerous for the Church. In Rwanda they have demonstrated patterns of manipulation within the Church, and the abuse of governmental relationships by the Church.

== Views on politics ==
Mbanda defended the UK-Rwanda asylum plan saying that "Rwanda is ready to welcome people needing a home".

== Personal life ==
Mbanda is married to Chantal; they had three children. Their son Edwin Mbanda died unexpectedly in his sleep at the age of 33 in Philadelphia on April 18, 2023, during the GAFCON conference that his father was hosting in Kigali.

Anglican Communion titles
Preceded by Onesphore Rwaje	Primate of the Anglican Church of Rwanda; Bishop of Gasabo; 2018–2026	Succeeded by Manasseh Gahima
Preceded by John Rucyahana	Bishop of Shyira; 2010–2018	Succeeded by Samuel Mugisha
Religious titles
Preceded by Foley Beach	Chairman of GAFCON/Global Anglican Council; 2023–present	Incumbent
Preceded by Stanley Ntagali	Vice Chairman of GAFCON; 2019–2023	Succeeded by Miguel Uchôa
