= Augustin Nshamihigo =

The Most Reverend Augustin Nshamihigo
- Primate of Rwanda, Bishop of Kigali
- Church: Anglican Church of Rwanda
- See: Kigali
- In office: 1992–1995
- Previous post: Bishop of Shyira

Orders
- Consecration: 1984

Augustin Nshamihigo was the first Primate of the Episcopal Church of Rwanda, now called Anglican Church of Rwanda.

Nshamihigo was a military chaplain when he was elected by the synod of Kigali Diocese to be the first bishop of the newly created Diocese of Shyira located in the northern part of Rwanda. He was consecrated on January 14, 1984. Eight years later, he was elected by the House of Bishops of the Province of Episcopal Church of Rwanda, Burundi and Zaire (Today's Democratic Republic of Congo) to be the first Archbishop of the new Episcopal Church of Rwanda, then with seven dioceses, Kigali, Butare, Shyira, Byumba, Kigeme, Cyangugu and Shyogwe. He was consecrated on June 7, 1992, at Amahoro Stadium in Kigali.

== Role in the 1994 Genocide ==
Historian Alison Des Forges describes Archbishop Nshamihigo's defense of the ongoing genocide during 1994:

Far from condemning the attempt to exterminate the Tutsi, Archbishop Augustin Nshamihigo and Bishop Jonathan Ruhumuliza of the Anglican Church acted as spokesmen for the genocidal government at a press conference in Nairobi. Like many who tried to explain away the slaughter, they placed the blame for the genocide on the RPF because it had attacked Rwanda. Foreign journalists were so disgusted at this presentation that they left the conference.

His successor, Archbishop Emmanuel Kolini said of Nshamihigo's role:

A number of Christian leaders during the 1980s and 1990s had previously been military chaplains, giving them close connection to the army. When the 1994 genocide started, many of them cooperated with the army. Even Anglican Archbishop Augustine (sic) Nshamihigo was implicated and is still on the run. The church [Episcopal Church of Rwanda] accused him and two other bishops of being errand boys for the government. They made a special tour in 1994 to speak to the media in Nairobi, Canada, England, and the United States, denying during the genocide that there were any killings. The Rwandan Church was corrupt.

== Life in exile ==
In August 1999, The Guardian reported that, "Former Archbishop Nshamihigo is living in exile, shunned by the Anglican church and facing arrest in Rwanda. He was last seen in Kenya." According to Douglas LeBlanc, former archbishop of Canterbury George Carey told the exiled Nshamihigo to resign:

Carey recalls meeting in May 1995 with Archbishop Augustin Nshamihigo, who was complicit in the ethnic genocide in Rwanda in the early 1990s. Carey said he told the Rwandan archbishop that he must return from Kenya, where he had fled during the genocide, to his people in Rwanda. That would lead to his certain death, Nshamihigo said. Saying that a shepherd functioning apart from the flock is nonsensical, Carey urged Nshamihigo to resign. Nshamihigo resigned within a few weeks.

Anglican Communion titles
Preceded by Adoniya Sebununguri	Primate of the Province of the Episcopal Church of Rwanda; 1992–1995	Succeeded by Emmanuel Kolini
Preceded by Adoniya Sebununguri	Bishop of Kigali; 1992–1995	Succeeded by Jonathan Ruhumuliza
New title	Bishop of Shyira; 1984–1992	Succeeded by John Rucyahana
