= Augustin Ahimana =

Rwandan Anglican bishop

The Right Reverend Augustin Ahimana
- Bishop of Kivu
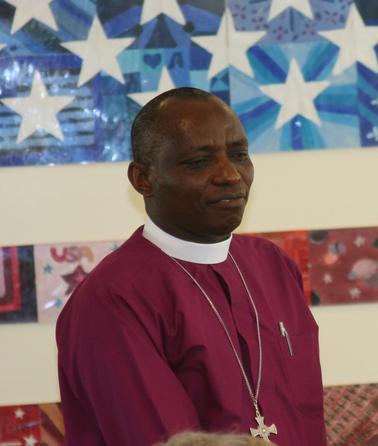
- Bishop Ahimana in Fairfield, Connecticut, USA 2009

Personal details
- Born: Musanze, Rwanda
- Education: Fuller Theological Seminary

Augustin Murekezi Ahimana is a Rwandan Anglican bishop. He is a bishop in the Province of the Anglican Church of Rwanda. He is Head of Planning and Development for the Province of the Episcopal Church of Rwanda. Bishop Ahimana built a team for the Athens Olympics in 2004. He was consecrated bishop of the Kivu Diocese on 21 December 2008.

== Attack on humanitarian organizations ==
Writing in the magazine Christianity Today, Ahimana rejected criticism of the Rwandan government by non-governmental organizations:

It is also our duty to inform American Christians that there has been a malicious campaign to demonize Rwanda's leaders, distorting the political situation. This distortion emanates from people often hiding behind so-called humanitarian organizations. Some have a hidden agenda of distracting the international community so that their own role in Rwanda's tragedy cannot be exposed.

== Defense of Rwandan invasions of the DRC ==
Bishop Ahimana defended the Rwandan invasions of the Democratic Republic of the Congo, which led to the First Congo War and the Second Congo War:

When Rwandan troops decided to pursue the genocidal forces and their sponsors in the Democratic Republic of Congo (DRC) in 1996 and 1998, they did so in the light of day. The peace we enjoy today in our country is mainly a consequence of that action.
