= Chuck Murphy (bishop) =

American bishop

The Right Reverend Chuck Murphy
- Missionary Bishop of the Anglican Mission in the Americas
- Church: Episcopal Church (until 2000); Anglican Church of Rwanda (2000-2009); Anglican Church in North America (2009-2011); Anglican Church of Congo (2011-2012); Anglican Mission in the Americas (2012-2018)

Orders
- Consecration: January 29, 2000 by Emmanuel Kolini

Personal details
- Born: Charles Hurt Murphy III; December 6, 1947 Decatur, Alabama, United States
- Died: January 8, 2018 (aged 70) Pawleys Island, South Carolina

Charles Hurt Murphy III (December 6, 1947 – January 8, 2018) was an American Episcopal bishop. He was the missionary bishop, bishop ordinary and chairman of the Anglican Mission in the Americas, the former missionary wing of the Anglican Church of Rwanda in the United States and Canada, since its origin in 2000. He was married for more than 40 years and had three adult daughters. He came from a family of Episcopal priests, being the son, brother and brother-in-law of priests.

Murphy was born in Decatur, Alabama. Murphy graduated from the University of Alabama at Birmingham. He afterwards moved to Trinity College in Bristol, England, where he studied theology under J. I. Packer. He completed his theology training at the University of the South. He died at Litchfield Plantation, Pawleys Island, South Carolina.

He served in several congregations in the United States, until being called to serve as rector of All Saints' Church in Pawleys Island, South Carolina, in 1982, where he would stay for more than 20 years.

A traditionalist Episcopalian, he opposed the more liberal tendencies of Anglicanism in North America. He convened and chaired the First Promise Movement in 1997, which issued the document "The First Promise" which "declared the authority of the Episcopal Church to be 'fundamentally impaired' because they no longer upheld the 'truth of the gospel'". The First Promise Movement is the origin of the formation of the AMiA in 2000, as the mission of the Anglican Church of Rwanda in the United States and Canada. The AMiA was a founding member of the Common Cause Partnership in June 2004, among six traditionalist Anglican organizations. It was a founding member of the Anglican Church in North America in June 2009, changing his status to "ministry partner" in June 2010. In December 2011, the AMiA split from the ACNA and lost its status with the Anglican Church of Rwanda. After temporary affiliation with the Anglican Church of Congo, the AMiA was revamped as a "Society of Missionary and Apostolic Works" in 2012.

Murphy retired in December 2013 and was replaced by Bishop Philip Jones. He died on January 8, 2018, of brain cancer.
