= C.S. Lewis Institute =

American nonprofit organization

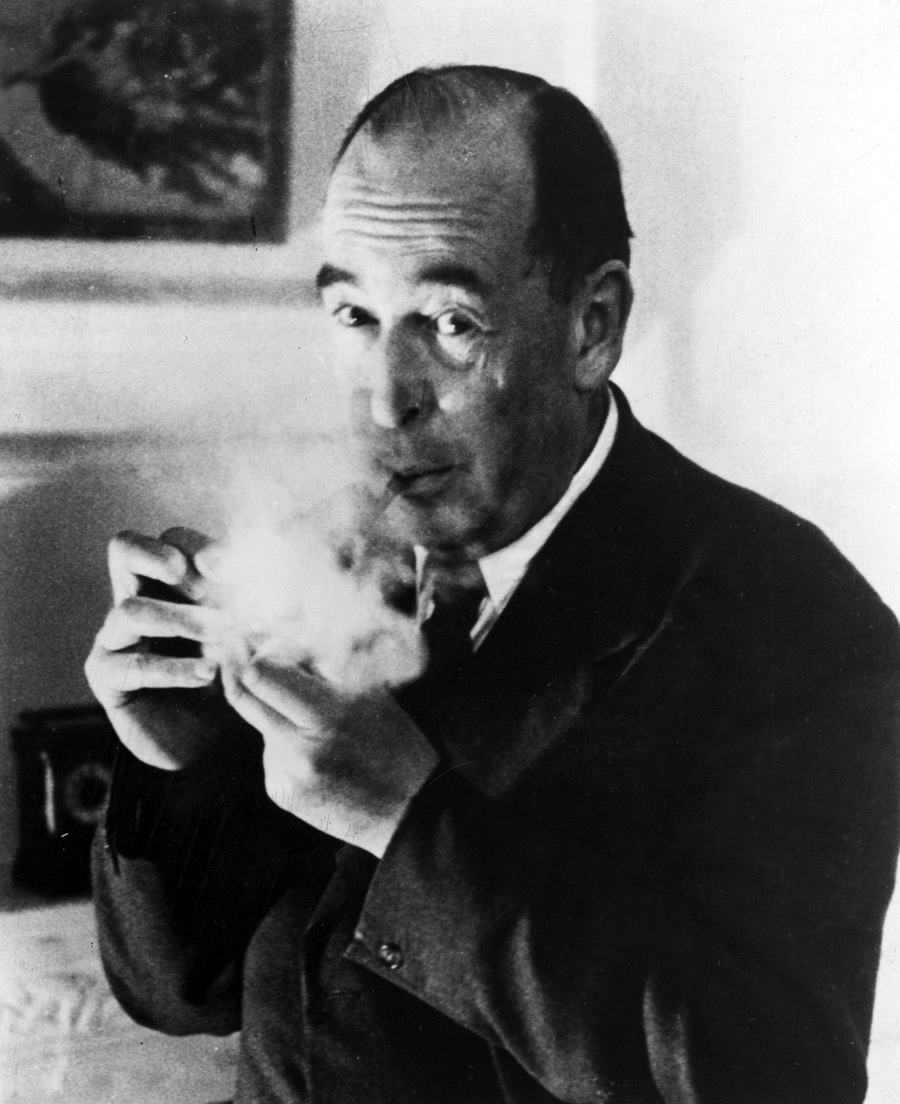
Portrait of C. S. Lewis, c. 1957

The C.S. Lewis Institute is an organization founded in 1976. According to their website, their mission statement is "to develop disciples who will articulate, defend, and live their faith in Christ in personal and public life."

== Background ==
The C.S. Lewis Institute was founded in 1976 by Dr. James Houston and James R. Hiskey. The Institute specializes in providing teachers who can lead worship and discuss current problems by referring back to the Bible. They also have the goal of providing discipling for individuals in small groups. C.S. Lewis was chosen to be the core name of the institution because his ideas reflect what the institution aims to achieve through their faith. They respect his ability to communicate his faith and how he became such a well known 20th century Christian figure. This made him worthy of being the representative for the name of the institution.

The institute's headquarters is located in Springfield, Virginia, just outside Washington, D.C. The C.S. Lewis Institution maintains associations with various churches in the Washington D.C. area and surrounding areas. In order to get into the group, an individual must have a reference from their pastors.

== Activities ==
The institute's activities are broken into the following areas:

- Conferences and lectures
- Fellows Program, mentoring groups giving theological and spiritual development
- Worldview Program
- Apologetic Evangelism Program

== See also ==
- C. S. Lewis
