= Dimissorial letters =

Letter authorizing Catholic ordination

Dimissorial letters (in Latin, litterae dimissoriae) are testimonial letters given by a bishop or by a competent religious superior to his subjects in order that they may be ordained by another bishop. Such letters testify that the subject has all the qualities demanded by canon law for the reception of the order in question, and request the bishop to whom they are addressed to ordain him.

The plural term is often used of a single document because of the influence of the Latin term, since in that language litterae, which literally means letters (of the alphabet) can also mean a letter (in the sense of message).

Before the entry into force of the Code of Canon Law in 1917, the term had a wider sense (see the article in the Catholic Encyclopedia of that period). The conditions for issuing dimissorial letters were also different and were more complicated.

== Authority to grant dimissorial letters ==
For ordination to the diaconate as a member of the diocesan clergy (i.e. at the service of a diocese), authority to grant dimissorial letters is vested in the bishop of the diocese in to which the candidate will be incardinated. For ordination to the priesthood, this authority is vested in the bishop of the diocese in which the person to be ordained is incardinated as a deacon. An apostolic administrator and, provided they have the consent of certain groups, certain other ecclesiastics provisionally in charge of a diocese can also issue such letters.

For ordination to diaconate or priesthood of a member of a religious institute, the major superior of the institute gives the letters, if the person to be ordained is a permanently professed member of the institute; all other members must obtain their dimissorial letters in the same way as the secular clergy do. In a mixed congregation of men (both priests and brothers) only a priest can be elected to be the major superior (superior general) and only a cleric that is superior general can issue a dimissorial letter.

== Requirements for granting dimissorial letters ==
The person who has authority to issue dimissorial letters is obliged to make sure that the testimonials and documents required by canon law have first been obtained.

These include certificates of completion of the prescribed course of studies and, for someone to be ordained a deacon, of baptism, confirmation, and reception of the ministries of reader (liturgy) and acolyte. If the candidate for the diaconate is married, additional certificates are required about his wedding and the consent of his wife to his ordination. For ordination to the priesthood a certificate of ordination to the diaconate is required.

In addition, a testimonial is required from the rector of the candidate's seminary or house of formation concerning his sound doctrine, genuine piety, good moral behaviour, fitness for the exercise of ministry and his physical and psychological health.

== See also ==
- Sacraments of the Catholic Church
