= Anglican realignment =

Religious movement

The Anglican realignment is a movement among some Anglicans to align themselves under new or alternative oversight within or outside the Anglican Communion.

Two of the major events that contributed to the movement were the 2002 decision of the Diocese of New Westminster in Canada to authorise a rite of blessing for same-sex unions, and the nomination of two openly gay priests in 2003 to become bishops. Jeffrey John, an openly gay priest with a long-time partner, was appointed to be the next Bishop of Reading in the Church of England and the General Convention of the Episcopal Church ratified the election of Gene Robinson, an openly gay non-celibate man, as Bishop of New Hampshire. Jeffrey John ultimately declined the appointment due to pressure.

The current realignment movement differs from previous ones in that on the one hand some Anglicans are seeking to establish different ecclesiastical arrangements within the Anglican Communion rather than separating themselves from it, and on another hand other Anglicans that had previously separated are being gathered into the new realignment structures along with those who were never Anglican/Episcopalian before. Some Anglican provinces, particularly in Nigeria, Kenya, West Africa, and South America, are seeking to accommodate them. A number of parishes that are part of the realignment have severed ties with the Episcopal Church and the Anglican Church of Canada and associated themselves with bishops from these other national Anglican provinces.

The conventions of four dioceses of the Episcopal Church voted in 2007 and 2008 to leave that church and to join the Anglican Church of South America. Twelve other jurisdictions, serving an estimated 100,000 persons at that time, formed on December 3–4, 2008 a Confessing Anglican body, the Anglican Church in North America (ACNA). The ACNA is seeking official recognition as a province within the Anglican Communion. The Church of Nigeria declared itself in communion with the new church in March 2009 and the Global Fellowship of Confessing Anglicans (GAFCON) formally recognized the new church in April 2009. In June 2009, the Anglican Church of Uganda also declared itself in full communion with the ACNA, and the Anglican Church of Sudan followed suit in December 2011.

In October 2025, GAFCON Chairman Laurent Mbanda, the Primate of Rwanda, announced that the GAFCON communion will officially be renamed the Global Anglican Communion and was planning to select a new primus inter pares instead of the Archbishop of Canterbury. He also asserted that GAFCON is not leaving the Anglican Communion but rather is the Anglican Communion. The election was going to take place at the next GAFCON, due to take place in March 2026 in Abuja, Nigeria, hosted by the Church of Nigeria. Mbanda said that in the wake of the appointment of Sarah Mullally as the Archbishop of Canterbury, and the resulting controversy it poses amongst evangelical Anglicans, that "this may be the most significant gathering of faithful Anglicans since 2008." "The statement outlining that plan was signed by one person, Rwanda Archbishop Laurent Mbanda, who serves as chair of GAFCON’s primate council." In March, 2026, GAFCON declined to elect a "rival" primus inter pares, opting instead to reorganize the existing Primates' Council as the "Global Anglican Council."

As of 2025, GAFCON claims to represent upwards of 85% of the world's practicing Anglicans. Peer-reviewed research from 2015 and 2016, published in the Journal of Anglican Studies by Cambridge University Press, indicates that the GAFCON-aligned provinces represent closer to 45% of practicing Anglicans and just over 54% of all Anglicans. Excluding the United churches in South Asia, the World Christian Database, published in 2021 and produced by the Center for the Study of Global Christianity at Gordon-Conwell Theological Seminary, estimated that the Anglican Communion had 97,399,000 members in 2020 with 63,556,000 in Africa, 24,400,000 in Europe, 4,565,000 in Oceania, 2,689,000 in North America, 1,230,000 in Asia, and 959,000 in Latin America.

== Overview ==
The movement that involves secession from local dioceses or provinces and yet seeks to remain within the Anglican Communion has been criticised by opponents who claim that, under historic Anglican polity, such a move is not possible. The concept of alternative episcopal oversight first arose a generation ago with the debate over the ordination of women. At that time, the movement manifested itself as an effort to accommodate conservative parishes and dioceses that did not want to accept the authority of women consecrated as bishops or bishops who ordained women, by providing pastoral oversight from a bishop who shared their conservative theology. The most thoroughly developed example of this involved the appointment of provincial episcopal visitors in the Church of England, beginning in 1994, who attend to the pastoral needs of parishes and clergy who do not recognise that holy orders can or should be conferred on women. The movement continues today primarily because of a very similar controversy regarding gay and lesbian members of the church, particularly the church's role in same-sex marriage and the ordination of homosexual clergy.

Per guidelines passed by the Anglican Consultative Council, a diocese and a province have geographical boundaries and no other diocese or province can exercise jurisdiction within those boundaries.

If the Anglican realignment movement succeeds, some dioceses will be defined by a common theological perspective: thus, a geographically distinct area may have multiple Anglican dioceses recognized by the Anglican Communion. As of October 2025, this proposal is one of many currently under consideration in the Nairobi-Cairo Proposals, a project aimed at renewing and reforming the Instruments of Communion.

== History ==
Since 1785, there have been disputes within the Episcopal Church that have led to departures of clergy and congregations. An early and notable example is King's Chapel, a historic church in Boston that was Anglican when founded in 1686. A century later, in 1785, a clergyman with Unitarian ideas took his congregation and formed an independent Unitarian church. To this day, King's Chapel believes itself to be both a Unitarian church and an extramural Anglican church as it uniquely uses the Book of Common Prayer According to the Use in King's Chapel in its worship.

In Canada, the first rupture with the incipient national church came in 1871, with the departure of the dean of the Diocese of British Columbia, Edward Cridge, and many of the congregation of Christ Church Cathedral over the issue of ritualism. Cridge and his followers founded a church under the auspices of the US-based Reformed Episcopal Church and continued to use the Book of Common Prayer.

For the most part, extramural Anglican churches are linked by the common use of forms of the Book of Common Prayer in worship. Like the example of King's Chapel, some use unique or historical versions. Over the years, various parallel Anglican denominations have broken with Anglican Communion churches over many, sometimes transient, issues.

Initial developments for the Anglican realignment started through the progressive tendencies of the Lambeth Conference. Beginning with the Lambeth Conferences, international Anglicanism has wrestled with matters of doctrine, polity, and liturgy in order to achieve consensus, or at least tolerance, between diverse viewpoints. Throughout the twentieth century, this led to Lambeth resolutions allowing for contraception and divorce, denouncing capital punishment, and recognising the autonomy of provinces in the ordination of women to the diaconate and priesthood. Despite the determination of the 1897 conference that communion provinces were autonomous and that no other province had jurisdiction within another, some provinces have sought to associate with others. Although Lambeth had not indicated support for the ordination of women to the priesthood at the time, some provinces began ordaining women to this order before Lambeth reconsidered the matter in 1978, just as some provinces have begun consecrating women bishops although there is likewise no international consensus.

The ordination of women priests in the United States in 1976 led to the founding of the Continuing Anglican Movement in 1977. Its Affirmation of St. Louis declared the ordination of women (by the Episcopal Church in the US and the Anglican Church of Canada) to be a matter of schism and to have caused a break with apostolic succession. The "Anglican Continuum", therefore, saw itself as perpetuating (i.e. continuing) the line of valid ordination considered essential to Anglicanism. In 1992, the Episcopal Missionary Church was established after its leaders first attempted to reform ECUSA from within. It is usually considered to have joined the Continuing Anglican Movement. Unlike the Anglican realignment movement, the churches of the Anglican Continuum do not seek to be accepted into the Anglican Communion.

Further developments within Anglicanism led the province of Rwanda, along with the province of Southeast Asia, to form the Anglican Mission in America (now called the Anglican Mission in the Americas) as a mission jurisdiction.

=== Timeline ===
==== 2000 ====
- Bishops Emmanuel Kolini and Moses Tay consecrated two clergy as bishops at St Andrew's Cathedral, Singapore outside of the authority of the Episcopal Church.

==== 2002 ====
- At its diocesan synod in May, the Anglican Diocese of New Westminster of the Anglican Church of Canada voted for the third time to permit the blessing of same-sex unions. After having withheld consent to the motion on two previous occasions, Bishop Michael Ingham agreed to it, as it met the benchmark of garnering more than 60% majority of votes by delegates. In response, nine parishes (including St. John's Shaughnessy, the largest Anglican church in Canada) withdrew from diocesan life, and the priests of two of the parishes led members of their congregations into churches affiliated with the Church of the Province of Rwanda. Two additional parishes returned to diocesan involvement after their dissenting rectors left. Five remain outside the ambit of the diocese.

==== 2003 ====
- Jeffrey John, an openly gay priest living with his long-time partner, was appointed to be the next Bishop of Reading. He withdrew his nomination under pressure after being asked to do so by the Archbishop of Canterbury.
- Gene Robinson — a divorced priest openly living in a committed gay relationship — was consecrated as bishop of the Episcopal Diocese of New Hampshire in the Episcopal Church of the United States. This event precipitated actions by dissenting Episcopal bishops and priests at the diocesan and parish level to disassociate themselves from the Episcopal Church and align themselves with other primates of the Anglican Communion, including the primates of Nigeria, Rwanda, and Bolivia. The Archbishop of Canterbury has not recognized such realignments as legitimate.
- A communique issued from a called meeting of the primates of the Anglican Communion on October 15–16 stated "that bishops must respect the autonomy and territorial integrity of dioceses and provinces other than their own", while also calling on Anglican provinces "to make adequate provision for episcopal oversight of dissenting minorities within their own area of pastoral care in consultation with the Archbishop of Canterbury on behalf of the Primates."

==== 2004 ====
- On January 11, the Rev. Foley Beach of Monroe, Georgia, resigned from his parish church and departed the Episcopal Church to start a new congregation, Holy Cross Anglican Church, under Bishop Frank Lyons of the Province of the Southern Cone and the Diocese of Bolivia. This began an exodus of clergy and congregations.
- Two parishes in Washington state—St. Charles Episcopal Church and St. Stephen's Episcopal Church—left the Episcopal Diocese of Olympia. The two churches affiliated with the Diocese of Recife under Robinson Cavalcanti prior to the creation of the ACNA.
- "In 2004 the majority of [Church of England] bishops had voted for legalising civil partnerships when that legislation made its way through parliament."

==== 2005 ====
- Clergy in the Church of England are permitted to register a civil partnership if they give assurances that their relationships are celibate. Jeffrey John, the dean of St. Alban's Cathedral, became the most senior cleric to register a civil union with his same-sex partner.
- Archbishop Peter Akinola, the primate of the Church of Nigeria, "has spoken out against the decision by the Church of England to open the way so positively for homosexual clergy in the UK."
- Archbishop Orombi of the Church of Uganda also criticised the Church of England stating that he agreed with Archbishop Akinola.
- Church of Nigeria announces a covenant with the Reformed Episcopal Church and the Anglican Province of America.

==== 2006 ====
- On November 4, Katharine Jefferts Schori, previously Bishop of Nevada, was invested at the Washington National Cathedral as the new Presiding Bishop of the Episcopal Church in the US. She was the only national leader of a church in the Anglican Communion who is a woman. The Seattle Times reported in Virginia, "Parishioners there weren't upset only by Bishop Peter James Lee's vote in 2003 to accept an openly gay bishop in New Hampshire; many of the members still object to female priests and the new female bishop who leads the U.S. church." Her election is a point of division within some provinces of the Anglican Communion, which does not universally accept the ordination of women.

In the Anglican realignment movement, the Anglican Mission in America, which has women priests, has decided that women will in the future, be ordained deacons but not priests or bishops. The two women priests in AMiA will continue to serve. The Anglican Communion Network, which includes parishes with women clergy and those that are opposed to women's ordination, has made it a policy to respect both positions. CANA is studying whether women newly aspiring to ordination should be approved."...CANA policies regarding the ordination of new female aspirants will be developed from a biblical and pastoral perspective." The American Anglican Council issued a statement, on the election of Bishop Schori which in part said "Jefferts Schori's election will obviously present problems for those who do not recognize the ordination of women priests". The AAC's "Statement of Faith: A Place to Stand: A Call to Mission" explicitly says under "Ministry in the Anglican Communion" that in regards to "practices contrary to biblical, classical Anglican doctrine and moral standards, we must not and will not support them."

- On December 12, a small group of evangelical leaders within the Church of England met with the Archbishop of Canterbury and presented "A Covenant for the Church of England"—a controversial document requesting alternate church structures to lend support and, possibly, oversight to evangelical parishes presently under theologically liberal bishops. The prominent evangelical bishop Tom Wright, Bishop of Durham, repudiated the document in a Church Times article.
- Also on December 12, the Anglican Church of Tanzania issued a declaration breaking its ties with the Episcopal Church stating, "the Anglican Church of Tanzania shall not knowingly accept financial and material aid from dioceses, parishes, bishops, priests, individuals and institutions in the Episcopal Church (USA) that condone homosexual practice or bless same-sex unions."
- On December 16 the two parishes which originally left the Episcopal Diocese of Olympia reached an agreement with the Episcopal Diocese of Olympia to share the church buildings between the diocese and themselves.
- On December 17, two parishes in Virginia—Truro Church and The Falls Church — voted unilaterally to sever ties to the Episcopal Church and placed themselves under the jurisdiction of the Church of Nigeria as part of its mission, the Convocation of Anglicans in North America (CANA). Nine additional Virginia parishes followed their lead within weeks by voting to leave the Episcopal Church and joining CANA; another former Episcopal parish in Virginia, Church of the Messiah in Chesapeake, had voted to join CANA in October 2006. The Diocese of Virginia took steps to maintain its claim on the church buildings and land of the two parishes.

==== 2007 ====
- On June 25, 2007, the Court of Appeals of the State of California overturned a lower court ruling and affirmed that where a hierarchical church — such as the Episcopal Church — has determined that the real and personal property of subordinate bodies must be used and maintained for the benefit of the larger church, the courts in California must respect and enforce that determination.. The case involved three parishes that left The Episcopal Church in August 2004 — now named St. James Anglican Church, Newport Beach; All Saints' Anglican Church, Long Beach; and St. David's Anglican Church, North Hollywood—and joined the Church of Uganda. Each parish maintained that it was entitled to keep parish property and not turn it over to The Episcopal Church and its respective dioceses. The Episcopal Diocese of Los Angeles, citing church canons which place all parish property in trust for The Episcopal Church and Diocese of Los Angeles, asserted that it was entitled to retain the property. The ruling of the Court of Appeals was a decisive decision for The Episcopal Church in California.
- On August 30, 2007, the Archbishop of Kenya, Benjamin Nzimbi, with several other archbishops from Africa, South America, the West Indies and the Indian Ocean region, consecrated two conservative American priests of the Episcopal Church as bishops. The new bishops pledged allegiance to Archbishop Nzimbi and intend to lead 30 American congregations out of the Episcopal Church.
- In November, Gregory Venables, Primate of the Anglican Province of the Southern Cone in South America, offered to place Canadian parishes under his jurisdiction. Two retired Canadian bishops relinquished their licences in the Anglican Church of Canada, becoming bishops of the Southern Cone in anticipation of what they hoped will either be the creation of a parallel province of the Anglican Communion in Canada, or the successor province to it.
- On December 8, 2007, the convention of the Episcopal Diocese of San Joaquin voted to leave ECUSA and join the Province of the Southern Cone as the Anglican Diocese of San Joaquin. The split created two dioceses, both claiming to be the Episcopal Diocese of San Joaquin. The one associated with the Southern Cone had more members and control of diocesan property.

==== 2008 ====
- March 29, 2008, those in the Diocese of San Joaquin who remained in the Episcopal Church hold a reorganizing convention.
- On April 24, 2008, the Episcopal Church and the Episcopal Diocese of San Joaquin filed a suit to recover the diocesan property from Bishop Schofield and those affiliated with the Province of the Southern Cone.
- June: The first Global Anglican Future Conference (GAFCON) is held, concluding with the "Jerusalem Declaration", which contained a call for the formation of "A Fellowship of Confessing Anglicans"
- On September 18, 2008 the House of Bishops of the Episcopal Church voted to depose GAFCON participant Bishop Robert Duncan of Pittsburgh for abandonment of the communion of the church. The sentence was officially declared by Presiding Bishop Schori on September 20, 2008.
- On October 4, 2008, the convention of the Episcopal Diocese of Pittsburgh voted to leave the Episcopal Church and join the Province of the Southern Cone. Those who did not leave the Episcopal Church immediately reorganized the Episcopal Diocese of Pittsburgh and were recognized by the Episcopal Church immediately. This effectively split the diocese leaving two bodies. The group leaving the Episcopal Church had about two-thirds of the parishes and slightly over half of the membership.
- On November 8, 2008, the synod of the Episcopal Diocese of Quincy voted to leave the Episcopal Church and join the Province of the Southern Cone. A small group of parishes led by the cathedral remained in the Episcopal Church and began planning for reorganization. The same day in Pittsburgh a special convention called by those who had left the Episcopal Church elected Robert Duncan as their bishop.
- On November 15, 2008, the convention of the Episcopal Diocese of Fort Worth voted to leave the Episcopal Church and align with the Southern Cone. Those who wished to remain in the Episcopal Church immediately organized and began planning for a special convention. This resulted in two organizations in Fort Worth both claiming to be the Episcopal diocese. Litigation over the name and property resulted.
- On December 4, 2008, leaders from the dioceses of Pittsburgh, Pennsylvania; Quincy, Illinois; Fort Worth, Texas; and San Joaquin, California; along with leadership from groups that left the Episcopal Church earlier (some as long ago as 1873) unveiled the draft constitution and canons of the new Anglican Church in North America.
- The Anglican Church in North America was established at a convention on December 3–4, 2008.

==== 2009 ====
- On January 5, 2009 the California Supreme Court issued an opinion that the Episcopal Diocese of Los Angeles was the owner of the church properties of those parishes in its diocese that had left the Episcopal Church. The decision was widely seen as providing a precedent covering all such property suits in the state.
- The Anglican Province of Nigeria declared itself in communion with the Anglican Church in North America in March 2009.
- The continuing diocese of the Episcopal Church files suit to recover church property from the Episcopal Diocese of Fort Worth that is part of ACNA.
- On April 16, 2009, the Fellowship of Confessing Anglicans recognized the Anglican Church in North America
- In May 2009 the Anglican Consultative Council met in Kingston, Jamaica with the Episcopal Church and the Anglican Church of Canada in full participation. ACNA was not added as a member or recognized in any way.
- On June 23, 2009, the Church of the Province of Uganda declared itself in communion with the Anglican Church in North America.
- On July 23, 2009 the Superior Court of Fresno ruled that the bishop of the Episcopal Diocese of San Joaquin was Jerry Lamb, the person recognized by the Episcopal Church and that he should have control of diocesan property.
- In October 2009, the Court of Common Pleas issued an opinion granting all diocesan property to the Episcopal Diocese of Pittsburgh (i.e. the group that remained in the Episcopal Church). On January 29, 2010, an implementation order directed the ACNA diocese headed by Archbishop Duncan to turn over all diocesan property to the Episcopal group.
- On October 28, 2009 the Diocese of Sydney, Australia, welcomed the Anglican Church in North America and declared its desire to be in full communion with it.

==== 2010 ====
- On February 10, 2010, the Church of England general synod changed a resolution that would have put the synod clearly on record as requesting full communion with ACNA so that it instead simply recognized the desire of ACNA to remain within the "Anglican Family", recognized the problems that this created and asked the archbishops to make a further report in 2011.
- In a particularly controversial case in the Episcopal Church's property disposition strategy, the Episcopal Diocese of Central New York sells the building of the former Episcopal Church of the Good Shepherd in Binghamton, New York, to the Islamic Awareness Center for far less than its appraised value and one-third of the value offered by the departing Anglican congregation.
- On April 12, 2010, Archbishop Ian Ernest of the Province of the Indian Ocean chair of the Council of Anglican Provinces of Africa, said he felt "constrained by my conscience … to forthwith suspend all communication both verbal and sacramental" with the Episcopal Church and the Anglican Church of Canada "until such time as they reverse their theological innovations."
- On April 23, 2010, representatives from 20 Anglican provinces, meeting in Singapore, called on the Episcopal Church in the United States and the Anglican Church of Canada to "Show genuine repentance" for actions that "show they continue in their defiance as they set themselves on a course that contradicts the plain teaching of the Holy Scriptures on matters so fundamental that they affect the very salvation of those involved."

==== 2011 ====
- In January 2011 the primates of the provinces of the Anglican Communion met with Episcopal Church Presiding Bishop Jefferts Schori in attendance. Several primates refused to attend. At the meeting no action was taken to recognize ACNA and Presiding Bishop Jefferts Schori was elected to the standing committee of the primates.
- February 2, the Commonwealth Court of Appeals in Pennsylvania upheld the decision to return all diocesan property to those who remained in the Episcopal Church. The same day one of the largest ACNA parishes signed a settlement with the Episcopal Diocese of Pittsburgh allowing it to purchase its building and agreeing that it would disaffiliate from the ACNA diocese for a minimum of five years or during the term that they were still making payments to the Episcopal Diocese.
- On February 8, 2011, the District Court in Tarrant County, Texas, issued a partial summary judgment declaring those who stayed in the Episcopal Church the rightful owners of all diocesan property of the Episcopal Diocese of Fort Worth. The order was stayed pending further arguments and appeals.

==== 2012 ====
- On February 27, the bishop of the Diocese of Gippsland defended the appointment of openly gay priest in a same-sex partnership. This was after Gippsland was criticised by the Anglican Church League, an organization pushing for realignment and primarily based in the conservative Diocese of Sydney.
- October 17, the Episcopal Diocese of South Carolina announced that it was disaffiliating itself from the national Episcopal Church, two days after Presiding Bishop Jefferts Schori informed Bishop Mark Lawrence that his ministry was restricted as a result of a verdict by the Disciplinary Board of Bishops. In September, the board had found Lawrence guilty of abandoning the Episcopal Church "by an open renunciation of the Discipline of the Church".

==== 2013 ====
- 21-26 October: Second GAFCON conference is held in Nairobi, Kenya.
- The Church of England "agreed that gay clergy in civil partnerships can become bishops so long as they remain sexually abstinent" releasing a statement that "The House [of Bishops] has confirmed that clergy in civil partnerships, and living in accordance with the teaching of the Church on human sexuality, can be considered as candidates for the episcopate." This was met with oppositions by traditionalists associated with GAFCON
- The Church of Nigeria released a statement against the Church of England's action to allow clergy in civil unions to be bishops; "The decision to permit homosexual clergy in civil partnerships to now be considered for the episcopacy is one step removed from the moral precipice that we have already witnessed in The Episcopal Church (USA) and the Anglican Church of Canada."
- The Church of Uganda criticised England with then Archbishop Ntagali saying "It is very discouraging to hear that the Church of England, which once brought the Gospel of Jesus Christ to Uganda, has taken such a significant step away from that very gospel that brought life, light, and hope to us."

==== 2014 ====
- The U.S. Supreme Court let stand a ruling from Virginia that the real estate and some other assets of The Falls Church legally belong to the Episcopal Diocese of Virginia, ending a challenge by overwhelming majority of that congregation who had wanted to retain the property when they decided to leave the Episcopal Church.
- Responding to a government consultation on same-sex civil partnerships, the Church of England asked for the government to continue offering civil unions. "The Church of England recognises that same-sex relationships often embody fidelity and mutuality. Civil partnerships enable these Christian virtues to be recognised socially and legally in a proper framework."
- Christian Concern, a conservative UK-based organisation, responded by criticising the Church of England's response on civil partnerships. "Since the legislation was passed, civil partnerships have always been understood to recognise a sexual relationship for homosexual couples. Yet, according to God's pattern all sexual activity outside marriage between a man and a woman is wrong and does not bring blessing. It is tragic that the Church of England is supporting such an arrangement."

==== 2016 ====
- In June, the Scottish Episcopal Church's general synod voted for a change in canon law to allow same-sex marriages; the proposal required a second reading in 2017.
- In July, the Anglican Church of Canada voted to change their marriage canon to allow for same-sex marriages; the proposal required a second reading in 2019.
- On September 3, 2016 Bishop Nicholas Chamberlain, a suffragan Bishop in the Diocese of Lincoln, revealed that he is gay, celibate, and in a long-term same-sex relationship with his partner. Archbishop Justin Welby defended the appointment saying that "He lives within the Bishops' guidelines and his sexuality is completely irrelevant to his office."
- GAFCON and other branches of the Anglican realignment movement referred to the appointment of Bishop Chamberlain as a "major error". GAFCON also claimed that the Church of England had violated the Lambeth 1.10 resolution arguing against its permission for clergy to enter into a civil partnership. GAFCON said that "Clergy are permitted to enter into same-sex civil partnerships as long as they are willing to give their assurance to their bishop that they are not sexually active. This practice is allowed in the Church of England, but is a violation of Lambeth I.10 which does not recognise this distinction."
- The Church of England responded to GAFCON and "pointed out clergy were allowed to enter civil partnerships and could offer prayers of support for same-sex couples."

==== 2017 ====
- In February 2017, the House of Clergy in the Church of England voted against a motion to 'take note' of a report that "maintained that marriage in church should only be between a man and a woman" and, because the motion required approval by all houses, the motion was not passed. The Archbishops of Canterbury and York called for "radical new Christian inclusion" following the debate.
- In April 2017, GAFCON announced that it planned to "appoint a 'missionary bishop' for conservative Christians in Europe, bypassing Anglican Churches in England and Scotland." "The Archbishops of Canterbury and York subsequently called for a 'radical new Christian inclusion' in what was seen as an indication that the Church's position might be liberalised."
- In July, the Church of England's General Synod "backed a motion calling for a ban on the practice of Conversion Therapy aimed at altering sexual orientation." The General Synod also voted "in favour of a motion that calls on bishops to consider creating new services to celebrate a transgender person's transition."
- The Archbishop of the Church of Nigeria, a member of GAFCON, "slammed the General Synod of the Church of England for 'false teaching' and is warning that it is in 'grave spiritual danger'."
- In the Anglican Church in New Zealand, the Bishop of Waiapu installed an openly gay priest, who is married to his partner, as the Dean of Waiapu Cathedral; the conservative Fellowship of Confessing Anglicans opposed the installation.
- In October, the Church of England's Diocese of Hereford "voted to support services and prayers to bless same-sex unions."

==== 2018 ====
- January: In order to mark a person's gender transition, the House of Bishops "are inviting clergy to use the existing rite Affirmation of Baptismal Faith." Later, the Church of England announced that guidance to celebrate and mark a trans person's gender transition would be included in formal liturgy through Common Worship.
- March: The Diocese of Christchurch in the Anglican Church in New Zealand voted to support a proposal to bless same-sex unions.
- May: The New Zealand General Synod voted in favour of allowing the blessing of same-sex unions.
- May: Anglican Church in Brazil is admitted to GAFCON as a province.
- June: The Anglican Episcopal Church of BrazilGeneral Synod voted in favour of allowing the blessing of same-sex unions.
- 17-22 June:Third GAFCON conference is held in Jerusalem, Israel.
- September: The Bishops of the Church in Wales declared that it is unjust to not provide "formal provision" for same-sex couples. The Governing Body of the church then voted in favour of exploring "formal provision for same-sex couples" in marriages or civil partnerships.

==== 2019 ====
- Archbishop Nicholas Okoh, the head of the Church of Nigeria, criticised the Church of England's affirmation of trans people as "false teaching" and stated that the English Church was no longer a focus of unity for the Anglican Communion due to being "too theologically liberal" in his opinion.
- The Archbishop of Canterbury, Justin Welby, announced that he had invited openly married and partnered gay bishops to the Lambeth Conference for the first time, but that their spouses and partners would not be invited. The decision to allow gay bishops but not their spouses or partners affected bishops who are in same-sex marriages or partnerships in the Anglican Church of Canada, Church of England, and the Episcopal Church.
- The Anglican Church of Canada did not amend its marriage canon but did approve a resolution allowing each provincial synod and diocese to choose to perform same-sex marriages.
- The Diocese of Wangaratta in the Anglican Church of Australia approved of blessing rites for same-sex marriages.

==== 2020 ====
- The Anglican Church of Australia's appellate tribunal, the church's highest court, ruled that a diocese may authorise the blessing of same-sex unions.
- GAFCON-Australia responded by announcing a split and realignment may be possible in the Australian church.
- The Church of England released its "Living in Love and Faith" document which is meant to facilitate conversations on human sexuality, and the church will discuss whether to bless or perform same-sex marriages in 2022 at General Synod.

==== 2021 ====
- October 2021, Anglican Church of India and the Continuing Evangelical Episcopal Communion found the Anglican Bishops Council of India (ABCI). ABCI held an international Christmas celebration with GAFCON later that year.

==== 2022 ====
- GAFCON established a diocese in Australia in reaction to the blessing of same-sex unions with former Sydney Archbishop, Glenn Davies, serving as the first diocesan bishop.
- The Diocese of Sydney voted to declare "a breach of fellowship" within the wider Anglican Church of Australia.
- Canterbury Cathedral announced the appointment of David Monteith, who is openly gay and in a civil partnership, as the next Cathedral Dean; he had the support of the Archbishop of Canterbury, Justin Welby.
- The Global South Fellowship of Anglicans Churches, an association of mostly conservative or 'orthodox' churches, criticised the appointment in Canterbury and released a statement saying that the "Archbishop of Canterbury shuts the door [of Canterbury Cathedral]" to them as a result of the appointment.

==== 2023 ====
- In January, 2023, the Church of England's House of Bishops announced that they will authorise "prayers of thanksgiving, dedication, and for God's blessing for same-sex couples."
- The General Synod of the Church of England voted to accept the Bishops' proposal and voted to allow blessings for same-sex couples following a civil marriage or civil partnership.
- While criticising the decision, Archbishop Justin Badi, the Primate of the Episcopal Church of Sudan and leader of the Global South Fellowship of Anglicans, said that the organisation will not leave the Anglican Communion.
- In response to the Church of England allowing the blessing of same-sex couples, the Anglican churches of Nigeria, Rwanda, Uganda, and Kenya criticised the decision and the Global South Fellowship of Anglicans indicated that it may "formally dissociate" from the Church of England over the issue. The Archbishop of Uganda reiterated that he did not plan to leave the Anglican Communion despite the criticism and impaired communion with other provinces.
- February 20: 10 archbishops from the Global South Fellowship of Anglicans announced that they were in a state of impaired communion with the Church of England and would no longer recognise the Archbishop of Canterbury as "first among equals" in the Anglican Communion.
- March: The Synod of Bishops for the Anglican Church in Southern Africa agreed to develop prayers to be said with same-sex couples while deciding against blessings or marriage for same-sex couples.
- 16-21 April: Fourth GAFCON conference is held in Nairobi, Kenya. The conference concludes with a demand for the resignation of then-current Archbishop of Canterbury, Justin Welby.
- May: Archbishop Kaziimba and the Church of Uganda expressed support for Uganda's anti-homosexuality laws which increased penalties for homosexuality including life in prison and the use of the death penalty in some cases.
- June: Archbishop Welby of Canterbury denounced the actions taken by the Church of Uganda and urged Archbishop Kaziimba to oppose the Anti-Homosexuality Act of 2023.
- In July, 2023, Archbishop Kaziimba continued the conflict over the laws by appealing to and offering support for the positions of Iranian President Ebrahim Raisi whose positions included the criminalisation of homosexuality.
- In November, 2023, the General Synod of the Church of England accepted the commended prayers of blessing for same-sex couples during regular church services, and also accepted an amendment to allow "standalone" blessings for same-sex couples on a trial basis while permanent adoption of "standalone" blessings will require further steps.

==== 2024 ====
- On April 25, 2024, the Anglican Church of Southern Africa published draft prayers to be said with couples in same-sex unions, asking members of the church to study the draft prayers.
- Archbishop Thabo Makgoba, the Primate of the Church of Southern Africa, encouraged the Synod to approve the prayers.
- The prayers included both blessings for same-sex couples during church services, and prayers acknowledging disagreement with same-sex relationships.
- In September, 2024, the Synod of the Church of Southern Africa rejected the authorisation of the prayers for use. Some priests indicated they would offer blessings for same-sex couples without the Synod’s approval.
- The Bishop of the Diocese of Saldanha Bay, Raphael Hess, gave permission for priests to bless same-sex couples locally following the Synod.

==== 2025 ====
- The Global Anglican Future Conference (GAFCON) announced through its leader, Laurent Mbanda, that it will officially be renamed Global Anglican Communion and was planning to select a new primus inter pares instead of the Archbishop of Canterbury. He also asserted that GAFCON is not leaving the Anglican Communion but rather is the Anglican Communion. The election was going to take place at the next GAFCON, due to take place in March 2026 in Abuja, Nigeria, hosted by the Church of Nigeria. It is described as a mini-conference. Mbanda said that in the wake of the appointment of Sarah Mullally as the Archbishop of Canterbury, and the resulting controversy it poses amongst evangelical Anglicans, that "this may be the most significant gathering of faithful Anglicans since 2008."
- Following the announcement, Mbanda stated that the announcement of the "Global Anglican Communion" was "closer to a rebrand than a new organization" and that they are reforming the existing Anglican Communion.
- Bishops from Kenya and Congo responded to the announcements. Emily Onyango, a Kenyan bishop, stated she supports Sarah Mullally as the new Archbishop of Canterbury. Alphonce Mwaro Baya, "of the GAFCON-aligned Mombasa Diocese," stated that the Kenyan Anglican Constitution has not changed and remains within the existing structures of the Anglican Communion. Zacharie Masimango Katanda, an Archbishop and former Primate of the Congo, stated that “The Church of Congo will not follow that call and remains a full member of the Anglican Communion, and also a member of the Global South.”
- As of 2025, GAFCON claims to represent upwards of 85% of the world's practicing Anglicans. Peer-reviewed research from 2015 and 2016, published in the Journal of Anglican Studies, indicates that GAFCON-aligned provinces represent closer to 45% of practicing Anglicans and just over 54% of all Anglicans.
- Research published in 2025, using 2020 data, by Church Times and Durham University faculty, shows that, among the world's more than 100 million Anglicans, excluding the United Churches, there are 63,497,000 in Africa, 23,322,000 in Europe, 3,698,000 in Oceania, 2,219,000 in North America, 958,000 in Latin America, and 909,000 in Asia.
- A dispute broke out over the legitimacy of GAFCON–ABCI in India formed by the Anglican Church of India and the CEEC–India after the international CEEC rebranded to Confessing Anglican Church.

==== 2026 ====
- In March 2026, GAFCON chose not to elect a "rival" primus inter pares to the Archbishop of Canterbury; GAFCON opted to rename and reorganize the Primates' Council as the "Global Anglican Council."
- Of the Anglican Communion Provinces affiliated with GAFCON, only the Primates of Nigeria, Uganda, and Rwanda attended the GAFCON 2026 Conference in Abuja, Nigeria; it was confirmed that the Primates of Alexandria, Chile, Congo, Kenya, Myanmar, and South Sudan did not attend.
- In October 2026, the Archbishop of the Anglican Province of the Niger and the Diocese of Awka announced the possibility that Awka may separate from the Church of Nigeria and continue to affiliate with the Church of England.

== Anglican realignment groups ==
- American Anglican Council
- Anglican Communion Network
- Global Fellowship of Confessing Anglicans
- Global Anglican Future Conference
- Global South Fellowship of Anglican Churches

=== Dioceses ===
Four dioceses have declared independence from TEC and claimed membership in the Anglican Province of the Southern Cone. None of these was listed by the Anglican Communion office as being part of the Province of the Southern Cone. They joined the Anglican Church in North America as founding dioceses in June 2009

- Anglican Diocese of San Joaquin
- Anglican Diocese of Pittsburgh
- Diocese of Quincy (ACNA)
- Episcopal Diocese of Fort Worth

The Diocese of South Carolina disassociated itself from the national Episcopal Church on October 17, 2012, and called a diocesan convention for November 17 to "iron out the necessary changes to our Canons and Constitution, and begin to discern the best way forward into a new Anglican future." On August 22, 2014, they were accepted into the Global South on an interim basis. On March 10, 2017, the Diocese announced its intent to join the Anglican Church in North America.

== Other unaffiliated Episcopal or Anglican organizations in North America ==
There are a number of other Episcopal or Anglican churches in the United States and Canada. Those that play a role in the Anglican realignment debate are listed in the next section:

=== Para-church organizations ===
- Society of the Holy Cross

=== Seminaries ===
- Andrewes Hall
- Cummins Memorial Seminary
- Cranmer Theological House
- Reformed Episcopal Seminary
- Trinity Anglican Seminary
- St. Joseph of Arimathea Anglican Theological College

== Organizations associated with other provinces ==
- Anglican Church of India—independent, non-Canterbury. Now part of GAFCON-Anglican Bishops Council of India.
- Anglican Coalition in Canada—the Canadian contingent of the Anglican Mission in the Americas
- Anglican Mission in the Americas—founded jointly by and affiliated with the Province of Rwanda and Province of South East Asia
- Anglican Province of America—independent, non-Canterbury. Now affiliated (intercommunion) with Province of Nigeria through the Anglican Church in North America.
- Confessing Anglican Church
- Convocation of Anglicans in North America—founded as a missionary diocese of the Province of Nigeria.
- Reformed Episcopal Church—independent, non-Canterbury. Now affiliated (intercommunion) with the Province of Nigeria through the Anglican Church in North America.
- Anglican Union for the Propagation of the Gospel

== See also ==
- Anglican Church in North America
- Continuing Anglican movement
- Continuing Evangelical Episcopal Communion
- Federation of Anglican Churches in the Americas
- Fellowship of Confessing Anglicans
- Global South Fellowship of Anglican Churches
- Personal ordinariate (Anglicanorum coetibus)
