= Adoniya Sebununguri =

Adoniya Sebununguri was an Anglican bishop in Rwanda.

Sebununguri was ordained deacon in 1954 and priest in 1956. He served the church in Uganda and Rwanda. He was consecrated the first Bishop of Rwanda in 1966.
