= Anglican Mission in the Americas =

North American church

Anglican Mission
- Classification: Anglican
- Orientation: mostly Anglican Charismatics and other Evangelicals, but some Anglo-Catholics
- Polity: Episcopal, Mission Society
- Leader: Philip Jones
- Associations: National Association of Evangelicals, Federation of Anglican Churches in the Americas
- Region: United States, Canada
- Founder: Various clergy from the above groups including Chuck Murphy as first Bishop
- Origin: 2000
- Separated from: Episcopal Church in the USA
- Congregations: 13
- Official website: www.theamia.org

The Anglican Mission in the Americas (AMiA) or The Anglican Mission (AM) is a self-governing church inheriting its doctrine and form of worship from the Episcopal Church in the United States (TEC) and Anglican Church of Canada with members and churchmen on a socially conservative mark on the liberal–fundamentalist spectrum of interpretation of the Bible. Among its affiliates is the Anglican Church in North America since their inception in June 2009, initially as a full member, changing its status to ministry partner in 2010. In 2012, the AM sought to clarify the clear intent of its founding by officially recognizing themselves as a "Society of Mission and Apostolic Works". At the same time, ceased its participation in the Anglican Church in North America and—in order to maintain ecclesial legitimacy—sought oversight from other Anglican Communion provinces.

It has as its view an authentic, unreformed mission including belief in one, holy, catholic, and apostolic Church while rejecting what is in its view a modern papal-led hierarchy, apocryphal sacraments, and post-apostolic, papal canon law and equally the adoption of inconsistently modern doctrines in the post-16th-century sects of Protestant Christianity. The Anglican Mission was officially established in July 2000 in Amsterdam, Netherlands, under the primatial oversight of the primates of Rwanda and South East Asia.

The Anglican Mission has been led since late 2013 by Bishop Philip Jones, who succeeded Bishop Chuck Murphy after 14 years. The Mission Center for the AM is in Dallas, TX.

AMiA, or AM, was formed in response to increased theological liberalism in the Episcopal Church in the United States (TEC) and the Anglican Church of Canada (ACC), the North American branches of the Anglican Communion.

== History ==
The origin of the Anglican Mission was the First Promise Movement. In 1997, 30 priests, led by Chuck Murphy, released a document called The First Promise which "declared the authority of the Episcopal Church to be 'fundamentally impaired' because they no longer upheld the 'truth of the gospel'". Concerned about the crisis in faith and leadership that fostered continued controversy in the Anglican Communion, Archbishops Emmanuel Kolini of Rwanda and Moses Tay of South East Asia believed the time had come for Missionary Bishops to safeguard the faith in North America and consecrated Chuck Murphy and John Rodgers as bishops at St. Andrew's Cathedral, Singapore, on January 29, 2000. The Anglican Mission was officially established later that year in July in Amsterdam, Netherlands under the Primatial Oversight of the Primates of Rwanda and South East Asia. St. Andrews Church of Little Rock, Arkansas, became the first in North America to come under the oversight of the Global South provinces.

In January 2005, the Anglican Coalition in Canada came under the AMiA's oversight. The following year the Mission was restructured as the Anglican Mission in the Americas. This new structure included within it the AMiA, ACiC, and the ACiA.

The Anglican Mission was a founding member of the Common Cause Partnership and of the Anglican Church in North America (ACNA). The Anglican Mission's relationship with the Anglican Church in North America was defined by protocol between the AM, the Province of Rwanda, and the ACNA. On May 18, 2010, however, it was announced that the AM would seek "ministry partner" status with the ACNA and remain in full mission partner status with the Province of Rwanda.

The Anglican Mission remained under the oversight of the Church of the Province of Rwanda, a member church of the Anglican Communion, and as a ministry partner of the ACNA through 2011. On December 5, 2011, Bishop Murphy and most of the bishops of the AM announced to the Province of Rwanda that the Anglican Mission would shortly be seeking ministry partnerships outside the Province of Rwanda, with Bishop Murphy declaring that the Lord had told him personally that he was like Moses leading people out of Egypt.

I must now say ... that I believe that the Lord's present word to me (and to us) now directs me to look beyond Genesis chapters 39–45, and on into the Book of Exodus ... that Africa [Egypt] could no longer be viewed as [AMIA's] lasting home .... Things have now been made very clear to me

— letter of Dec. 5, 2011 to Archbishop Rwaje.

Following this announcement, the Rwandan church decided to form a separate group in the USA that remained in affiliation with the Province of Rwanda through a new jurisdiction known as PEARUSA. For a fuller picture of these events, see this VirtueOnline article.

Up to that point, all clergy from the AM had been ordained under the supervision of the Archbishop of Rwanda, the Archbishop of South East Asia, and other participating Anglican Primates and Rwandan bishops. Clergy in the AM were and are indigenous - they receive their ordination from primates and bishops in full communion with the Anglican Church but are from the area in which mission work is to take place and are under the authority of the Apostolic Vicar of the Anglican Mission. Many of the original bishops and priests of the AM were drawn from North America and were often former TEC or ACC priests.

The AMiA planted 268 churches during his first eleven years of existence, according to Bishop Chuck Murphy's final address on 27 February 2013, but lost two thirds of them to other jurisdictions after severing relations with the Anglican Church of Rwanda in December 2011. The number of remaining churches, according to him, was around 69. He expressed his belief that the AMiA should continue his work as a missionary society in North America.

As of August 2019, the AM includes 17 churches in 11 states. In March 2021, the number is 15 churches. The Anglican Mission in Canada has 9 churches in 4 Canadian provinces.

== Status with regard to the Anglican Communion ==
At the time of its formation, the AM's claim that it remained part of the worldwide Anglican Communion through the Province of Rwanda was recognized by many Anglican primates, including George Carey, who was Archbishop of Canterbury (head of the Anglican Communion). The former archbishop of Canterbury, Rowan Williams, followed a similar path to try to preserve unity between mostly Western and Global South Anglicans. However, the AM is not formally in communion with the current archbishop of Canterbury due to the attempts of the archbishop to retain unity with the Episcopal Church USA.

== Current bishops consecrated in the Anglican Mission ==
- Philip Hall Jones (active)
- Alexander Maury (Sandy) Greene (active)
- Silas Tak Yin Ng (active)
- Thomas William (T. J.) Johnston, Jr. (inactive)

== Current College of Consultors ==
- RECTOR: Emmanuel Kolini
- VICE-RECTOR:Yong Ping Chung
- SECRETARY:Moses Tay
- CONSULTORS: Sospeter T. Ndenza; William B Mugenyi
- GENERAL SECRETARY: Mike Murphy

== Bibliography ==
- Never Silent by Thad Barnum - Publication details at Amazon
