= Anglican Church of Rwanda =

Province of the Anglican Communion

- Église anglicane du Rwanda; Itorero Angilikani mu Rwanda
- Classification: Protestant
- Orientation: Anglican
- Scripture: Holy Bible
- Theology: Anglican doctrine
- Polity: Episcopal
- Primate: Manasseh Gahima
- Associations: Anglican Communion, GAFCON
- Headquarters: Kigali, Rwanda
- Territory: Rwanda
- Members: 1,500,000 (2025)
- Official website: Official website

The Anglican Church of Rwanda (French: Église anglicane du Rwanda; Kinyarwanda: Itorero Angilikani mu Rwanda) is a province of the Anglican Communion, covering 13 dioceses in Rwanda. In September 2026, Manasseh Gahima was elected primate of the province.

== Official names ==
The Province of the Anglican Church of Rwanda was also known by its French name, Province de L'Eglise Anglicane au Rwanda (PEAR). The former name of the province, Province de L'Eglise Episcopal au Rwanda, was changed by action of an extraordinary meeting of the Provincial Synod at St. Étienne, Biryogo, on November 29, 2007. The province changed its name once again to Anglican Church of Rwanda in a decision taken at their Synod, in September 2019. Archbishop Laurent Mbanda, in an official letter as vice chairman of GAFCON, explained the decision: "Removing the word ‘Province’ is a significant change. We are not subjects. Some want us to accept that it is essential to being Anglican that you are recognised by Canterbury, but we find our identity first and foremost through our Biblical and Anglican doctrinal inheritance in Christ. The Jerusalem Statement and Declaration of 2008 concluded ‘We can only come to the devastating conclusion that ‘we are a global Communion with a colonial structure’’. We seek only to be a colony of heaven!"

== History ==
The Province of the Anglican Church of Rwanda traces its roots to two missionary doctors of the British Church Missionary Society who served in Rwanda in 1914. Arthur Stanely Smith and Leonard Sharp travelled from Kabale, in Uganda, and began a mission movement in the Eastern area of Gisaka, in Rwanda, which ran from 1914 to 1916. They would reach Rukira in 1922. Geoffrey Holmes, a captain from the British Army, would start an Anglican mission in Gahini, in 1925. In 1926, Harold Guillebaud baptised the first converts at Gahini. Guillebaud would later translate Christian books into Kinyarwanda. In the years that followed, more Anglican missions where created, including one started by Geoffrey Holmes in Kigeme, in 1931.

After the independence of Rwanda from Belgium, in 1962, the Anglican Church of Rwanda was created, in 1965. This was under the Province of Rwanda, Burundi and Boga Zaire. The first Diocese was initiated in 1966, with Adoniya Sebununguri serving as the first Anglican Bishop of Rwanda. A new diocese of Butare was created in 1975. The name, "Anglican Church of Rwanda" (Église Anglicane au Rwanda) was adopted on 18 October 1979, still at the Province of Rwanda, Burundi and Boga Zaire.

On 7 June 1992, the Province of the Episcopal Church of Rwanda in the Anglican Communion was formed, consisting of seven dioceses, Kigali, Butare, Shyira, Byumba, Cyangugu, Kigeme and Shyogwe with the first Archbishop being Augustin Nshamihigo. At that time, one bishop was Tutsi while eight were Hutu; within five years (after the genocide), six of the bishops were Tutsi. In 1998, Nshamihigo was succeeded by Archbishop Emmanuel Kolini, who would be in office until 2011.

The 1994 genocide and war left the Church and the nation in ruins. Since peace has returned, the Church has embarked on a program of spiritual healing for thousands of traumatised people. Kigali Anglican Theological College (KATC) was started in February 2006 as a response to the training needs of the Anglican Church of Rwanda in post Genocide Rwanda and is staffed by pastors from several home dioceses, local staff, one CMS Britain Mission Partner and a number of visiting lecturers from partners from the UK and the USA. The college states that it strives to provide quality Christian training to the next generation of Christian leaders for Rwanda and, in turn, to assist in the development of the whole country. The School of Theology was the first to open in the custom-built buildings situated in an area of new development not far from Kigali. A Language School was opened in 2006 to meet the language needs of Francophone students who had to study in English. In 2008, there were around 40 students studying in both the School of Theology and the Language School.

In the early 2000s, the church changed its name from ‘L’Église Episcopale au Rwanda’ to ‘Province de l'Église Anglicane au Rwanda’. In 2019, the name was changed again to ‘l'Église Anglicane au Rwanda’.

== Membership ==
In 2025, there are over one million Anglicans in the country, of whom 85,000 are active members. This is out of an estimated population of 14.7 million, making it one of the largest Christian denominations in Rwanda.

In 2017, Growth and Decline in the Anglican Communion: 1980 to the Present, published by Routledge, collected research reporting there were 1,240,000 members of the church in Rwanda.

== Structure ==
The polity of the Anglican Church of Rwanda is episcopal church governance, which is the same as the other Anglican churches. The church maintains a system of geographical parishes organized into 13 dioceses, each one headed by a bishop.

=== Dioceses ===
| Diocese | Year founded | Territory | Cathedral | See city | Bishop(s) |
|---|---|---|---|---|---|
| Butare | 1975 | Huye, Gisagara | St. Paul's Cathedral | Butare | Nshimiyimana Christophe |
| Byumba | 1991 | Gicumbi, Gatsibo, Nyagatare | St. Paul's Cathedral | Byumba | Emmanuel Ngendahayo |
| Cyangugu | 1993 | Rusizi, Nyamasheke | Christ the King Cathedral | Cyangugu | Nathan Muhutu |
| Gahini | 1997 | Kayonza | St. John's Cathedral | Gahini | Vacant |
| Gasabo | 2011 | Northern Kigali | Holy Trinity Cathedral | Kigali | Manasseh Gahima |
| Karongi | 2020 | Karongi | Karongi Cathedral | Gitesi | Jean Pierre Methode Rukundo |
| Kibungo | 1993 | Kirehe, Ngoma, Rwamagana | St Peter’s Cathedral | Ngoma | Emmanuel Ntazinda |
| Kigali | 1966 | South and central Kigali, Bugesera | St. Etienne Cathedral | Kigali | Nathan Amooti Rusengo |
| Kigeme | 1992 | Nyamagabe | St Emmanuel Cathedral | Gasaka | Assiel Musabyimana |
| Kivu | 2008 | Rubavu, Nyabihu, Ngororero, Rutsiro | Kivu Cathedral | Gisenyi | Augustin Ahimana |
| Nyaruguru | 2022 | Nyaruguru | N/A | N/A | Vincent Habimfura |
| Shyira | 1984 | Musanze, Burera, Gakenke, Rulindo | St. John the Baptist Cathedral | Ruhengeri | Samuel Mugisha |
| Shyogwe | 1992 | Muhanga, Kamonyi, Nyanza, Ruhango | St. Peter's Cathedral | Shyogwe | Jered Kalimba |

=== Archbishop of Rwanda ===
The Archbishop of Rwanda is both metropolitan and primate. Holders of the office have been:

- Augustin Nshamihigo, 1992–1995
- Emmanuel Kolini, 1998–2011
- Onesphore Rwaje, 2011–2018
- Laurent Mbanda, 2018–2026
- Manasseh Gahima, 2026–present

== Worship and liturgy ==
The Province of the Anglican Church of Rwanda embraces three orders of ministry: deacon, priest, and bishop. A local variant of the Book of Common Prayer is used.

== Doctrine and practice ==
The center of the Church teaching is the life and resurrection of Jesus Christ. The basic teachings of the church, or catechism, include:

- Jesus Christ is fully human and fully God. He died and was resurrected from the dead.
- Jesus provides the way of eternal life for those who believe.
- The Old and New Testaments of the Bible were written by people "under the inspiration of the Holy Spirit". The Apocrypha are additional books that are used in Christian worship, but not for the formation of doctrine.
- The two great and necessary sacraments are Holy Baptism and Holy Eucharist.
- Other sacramental rites are confirmation, ordination, marriage, reconciliation of a penitent, and unction.
- Belief in heaven, hell, and Jesus's return in glory.

The threefold sources of authority in Anglicanism are scripture, tradition, and reason. These three sources uphold and critique each other in a dynamic way. This balance of scripture, tradition and reason is traced to the work of Richard Hooker, a sixteenth-century apologist. In Hooker's model, scripture is the primary means of arriving at doctrine and things stated plainly in scripture are accepted as true. Issues that are ambiguous are determined by tradition, which is checked by reason. Women may be ordained as deacons and priests. However, women are not allowed to be ordained bishops.

=== Ecumenical relations ===
The Anglican Church of Rwanda is a member of the ecumenical World Council of Churches.

== Anglican realignment ==
The Anglican Church of Rwanda is a member of the Global Anglican Future Conference, and has been involved in the Anglican realignment. Their opposition to departures from the conservative Anglican faith taken in North America led them to start a missionary organization, the Anglican Mission in the Americas, in the United States and Canada, and to support the creation of the Anglican Church in North America, of which the Anglican Mission in the Americas was a founding member, in June 2009. The AMiA changed its status to ministry partner in 2010, which it was until December 2011, when it disaffiliated from the Anglican Church of Rwanda. Archbishops Onesphore Rwaje and Robert Duncan of the Anglican Church in North America issued a Joint Communiqué on April 28, 2012, to address the future of the AMiA. Meanwhile, the House of the Bishops of Rwanda decided the establishment of the Missionary District in North America (PEARUSA) to pursue the same work in the United States, while it was given the AMiA members three alternatives: to join the PEARUSA, to join another Anglican jurisdiction through letters dimissory or remain in the AMiA. It was established the deadline of August 31, 2012, for the clergy and the congregations of the AMiA to decide their future. On April 29, 2012, Archbishop Henri Isingoma expressed his official approval for the temporary admission of the AMiA at the Anglican Church of Congo until his future was clarified. On 21 June 2016, PEARUSA three networks were fully transferred to the Anglican Church in North America (ACNA), becoming two new dioceses.

Archbishop Onesphore Rwaje attended GAFCON II, which took place in Nairobi, Kenya, from 21 to 26 October 2013. The province was represented at GAFCON III, by a 47 members delegation, including Archbishop Laurent Mbanda.

== See also ==
- Augustin Ahimana, bishop of Kivu
