= Emmanuel Kolini =

Congolese-Rwandan Anglican bishop (born 1945)

The Most Reverend Emmanuel Kolini
- Primate of Rwanda, Bishop of Kigali
- Church: Anglican Church of Rwanda
- See: Kigali
- In office: 1998 - January 2011
- Previous posts: Bishop of Katanga, Zaire

Orders
- Ordination: 1969
- Consecration: 1980

Personal details
- Born: 1945 (age 80–81) Belgian Congo

Emmanuel Mbona Kolini (born Belgian Congo, 1945) is a Congolese-Rwandan Anglican bishop. He was the second primate of the Episcopal Church of Rwanda, named Anglican Church of Rwanda in 2019, from 1998 to 2011. He is married and a father of eight children. Kolini currently serves as the rector of the Anglican Mission in the Americas College of Consultors.

== Ecclesiastical career ==
He studied at Canon Warner Memorial College, Bishop Tucker College, in Mukono, Uganda, now known as the Uganda Christian University, and the Balya Bible College, also in Uganda. He worked as a primary school teacher and headmaster in some refugee schools in Bunyoro, Uganda. He has a degree in theology from the Virginia Theological University in the United States.

Kolini was ordained an Anglican priest in 1969. He was consecrated as the assistant bishop of Bukavu, Zaire, in 1980. He was the bishop of the Diocese of Katanga, in Zaire, from 1986 to 1997. Kolini was called to be the second Primate of the Episcopal Church of Rwanda in 1998, being also Bishop of the Diocese of Kigali, the capital of Rwanda. He was in office until 2011.

He had an important role in the pacification of the post-genocidal Rwanda. In September 2007, Kolini intervened to prevent Paul Rusesabagina from speaking at All Souls Anglican Church, in Wheaton, Illinois, an AMiA parish, allegedly by pressure of Rwandan President Paul Kagame.

He has been a leading name in the Anglican realignment, as a member of the Global South and the Fellowship of Confessing Anglicans. On April 20, 2010, at the Global South meeting in Singapore, he called for a new Anglican Ecumenical Council, modeled by the first Ecumenical Councils of the Christian Church. Archbishop Kolini stated that: "We are standing at the crossroads. I say let my people go. This is the 4th trumpet call. The Holy Spirit led the first Council of Jerusalem. He will lead ours. We have what the biblical structure offers us we have the tradition of 2000 years." He expressed his full support for a renewed Anglican Communion: "Moses led God's people out of Egypt (Exodus 3). Now is a time for bold action. Let my people go. We need to declare to the world let my people go. We need a renewed communion, dependent on the Holy Spirit not resolutions. Singapore is a new Sinai."

As of August 2026, he became a partner bishop for the Anglican Missionary Society Global, which became partnered with the Evangelical Episcopal Communion.

== Support for M23 ==
The United Nations Group of Experts on the Democratic Republic of Congo (DRC) issued a report on 27 June 2012, which implicated Kolini (misspelled as "Coline") with leading a meeting for the National Congress for the Defence of the People (CNDP) politicians in support of the March 23 Movement (M23) rebel group, operating in the DRC. The UN report stated that: "Another similar M23 meeting with Rwandan authorities took place on 26 May 2012 in Ruhengeri, Rwanda, at Hotel Ishema. According to intelligence sources and to politicians with close ties to Kigali, the RDF organized the meeting for CNDP politicians, which was chaired by Bishops John Rucyahana and Coline, both senior RPF party leaders. The aim of the meeting was to convey the message that the Rwandan Government supports M23 politically and militarily. All Rwandophone politicians and officers were instructed to join M23, or otherwise leave the Kivus. In particular, CNDP politicians have been asked to resign from the North Kivu Governorate and to withdraw from the Presidential Majority."

== Works ==
He co-wrote, with Peter R. Holmes, Christ Walks Where Evil Reigned (2007), about the Rwanda genocide, and Rethinking Life: What the Church Can Learn from Africa (2010).

He is the subject of the book Emmanuel Kolini: The Unlikely Archbishop of Rwanda (2008), by Mary Weeks Millard.

Anglican Communion titles
Preceded by Augustin Nshamihigo	Primate of the Province of the Episcopal Church of Rwanda; 1998–2011	Succeeded by Onesphore Rwaje
