= Jurisdiction of the Armed Forces and Chaplaincy (organization) =

Alabama nonprofit organization for Anglican chaplains

- The seal of the JAFC
- Abbreviation: JAFC
- Predecessor: Convocation of Anglicans in North America
- Type: 501(c)(3) organization
- Tax ID no.: 82-2822000
- Location: Montevallo, Alabama, United States
- Region served: North America
- Bishop: Derek Jones
- Suffragan bishop: Marshall MacClellan
- Affiliations: Unaffiliated
- Website: anglicanchaplains.org

The Jurisdiction of the Armed Forces and Chaplaincy (JAFC) is a 501(c)3 nonprofit organization based in Alabama that licenses and endorses chaplains in the U.S. Armed Forces and in other fields of chaplaincy. Founded in 2007 to endorse chaplains serving outside the Episcopal Church during the Anglican realignment, the organization was originally a deanery of the Convocation of Anglicans in North America (CANA) and thus the Anglican Church of Nigeria.

After CANA became one of the founding entities of the Anglican Church in North America (ACNA), the chaplaincy deanery was recognized as the Special Jurisdiction of the Armed Forces and Chaplaincy established by the ACNA's canons. Meanwhile, founding bishop Derek Jones established a nonprofit organization in Montevallo, Alabama, under the same name. While operating as the ACNA's Special Jurisdiction, the JAFC maintained its canonical residency in the Church of Nigeria until 2021, when it was fully integrated into the ACNA. As of 2024, with more than 300 chaplains—187 of them serving as active-duty military chaplains—the JAFC was the principal endorser of Anglican military chaplains in the United States and also administered the ACNA's government relations function.

In September 2025, amid allegations of misconduct on the part of Jones and counter-charges against the ACNA, the JAFC nonprofit's executive committee announced its disaffiliation from the ACNA and unsuccessfully sued the ACNA for "trademark infringement and unfair commercial competition". The ACNA continued to recognize the Special Jurisdiction of the Armed Forces and Chaplaincy as the chaplain endorsement entity created by its canons.

== History ==
=== Formation ===
In 2014, the ACNA approved the constitution and canons of a new Special Jurisdiction of the Armed Forces and Chaplaincy (SJAFC) to endorse and license its chaplains and formally constituted the SJAFC under the leadership of Bishop Derek Jones at the Provincial Assembly. Jones was affirmed that year as the first bishop of the JAFC. In 2015, the SJAFC endorsed 153 chaplains. Meanwhile, Jones formed a nonprofit organization based in Montevallo, Alabama, that shared the name Jurisdiction of the Armed Forces and Chaplaincy; it received 501(c)3 tax-exempt status in 2017. By 2024, the SJAFC had become the principal endorser of Anglican military chaplains in the United States with more than 300 chaplains, 187 of them serving as active-duty military chaplains. Fielding roughly 10% of all active-duty U.S. military chaplains, the JAFC has been described as the ACNA's "crown jewel" for providing the small denomination with an outsized representation among the U.S. armed forces.

=== Disaffiliation from the ACNA ===
In September 2025, a significant conflict broke out in the ACNA that resulted in the JAFC nonprofit disaffiliating from the province and Jones leaving the ACNA. On September 12, after reviewing what the ACNA called "multiple allegations of ecclesiastical abuse of power (deemed to be credible) against Bishop Jones," the archbishop of the ACNA, Steve Wood, informed Jones that a third-party would be conducting an independent investigation into the allegations. According to The Living Church, the complainants included "at least six people alleging wrongful use of disciplinary processes, at least three alleging backdating or fabrication of church documents, at least two alleging interference with external employment opportunities, at least one alleging wrongful release of a priest from orders, and six alleging infliction of 'financial, emotional, and psychological stress' upon persons in Jones’ care." The charges included alleged efforts by Jones to interfere with chaplains' employment after their departure from the JAFC and a "pay to play" tithing policy that required chaplains to donate a portion of their income to the JAFC nonprofit.

Jones told Religion News Service (RNS) that he was initially willing to cooperate with the investigation until JAFC canon lawyers informed him of their opinion that an investigation could not occur before the filing of a formal presentment and forming of a board of inquiry. (Officials from the ACNA later repudiated this understanding, defending the practice of opening an investigation before filing a presentment as customary.) On September 20, Jones told RNS, he signed a letter withdrawing from the ACNA. The next day, Wood issued an admonition inhibiting Jones from ordained ministry. On September 22, the JAFC's executive committee issued a letter announcing that it had withdrawn the jurisdiction from the ACNA. That evening, in a video call with JAFC chaplains which was later made public, Jones denied the allegations, rejected Wood's ability to inhibit him, and argued that the ACNA had delayed a purported canonical revision that would have explicitly recognized the jurisdiction's right to disaffiliate. Wood appointed Robert Duncan, the first primate of the ACNA, to oversee the jurisdiction temporarily. Ducan wrote directly to Jones with an ultimatum: "Instead of ending as a hero, you will be remembered as a scoundrel. Retire now. … End as one who shaped and led a great movement or be remembered as a villain."

Jones and his supporters went on to claim that he was being targeted for his conservative criticism of Wood and other progressive leaders in the ACNA, citing a "woke" mentality and situating the dispute within a broader ongoing theological conflict between egalitarian and complementarian views in the ACNA regarding the ordination of women: "Steve promised that he was going to navigate those waters well, but in fact, has hired nothing but egalitarian staff, in training bishops, has nothing but egalitarian bishops. He's trying to push an agenda." The JAFC's chief operations officer, Ryan Davis, wrote that the leadership of ACNA had ignored complaints about "dioceses drifting into heterodoxy" and ordaining clergy who "openly reject biblical teaching" on abortion and homosexuality: "These same dioceses were … knowingly ordaining such individuals, and then attempting to force the JAFC to receive them. We cannot in conscience cooperate with an extra-canonical process designed to silence dissent."

Officials from the ACNA pushed back on these claims, saying that Jones was inhibited because of "credible complaints", and cited the case as an illustration of the need for more transparent bylaws and comprehensive canonical reform in the ACNA. Wood wrote in an open letter to the denomination that it was his duty to ensure that complaints were thoroughly and fairly investigated. Wood and the ACNA also disputed the jurisdiction's ability to leave the province, arguing that it was instituted as a "canonical ministry" of the ACNA and thus does not have the right of a diocese to withdraw. Meanwhile, a law firm hired by the JAFC insisted that it did have the ability to leave and sent a cease and desist letter to the ACNA stating that the ACNA does not have "any ecclesiastical or practical right of supervision over the Jurisdiction or its chaplaincy program." On September 25, the ACNA College of Bishops elected SJAFC Suffragan Bishop Jay Cayangyang bishop of the ACNA's chaplaincy jurisdiction. According to the ACNA, it initiated processes with the Department of Defense to ensure chaplains who wished to remain endorsed by ACNA could retain an uninterrupted endorsement, and a Department of War official told RNS that "chaplains should not be concerned about their certifications to serve."

=== JAFC v. ACNA ===
On October 6, 2025, the JAFC filed a complaint against the ACNA in the Charleston Division of the United States District Court for the District of South Carolina through its law firm, Nelson Madden Black, demanding the ACNA refrain from claiming to oversee the JAFC. The complaint accused the ACNA of multiple unfair business practices including alleged misrepresentation, false advertising, misappropriation, tortious interference, trademark infringement, defamation, and breach of the South Carolina Unfair Trade Practices Act. In an FAQ document, a JAFC spokesperson claimed that Jones was the victim of "a targeted attack" by Wood, citing Jones' alleged criticism of "errors, missteps, and mismanagement within the Archbishop's office." According to The Living Church, the complaint framed the JAFC nonprofit as a "business that offers chaplain endorsements as a service" and the JAFC alleged the ACNA's efforts to communicate with chaplains and government agencies about Jones' departure as engaging in unfair competition. Within weeks of Jones' inhibition, the JAFC lost half its income, and half of the chaplains and two-third of missions, parishes and chapels had disaffiliated from the JAFC to remain in the ACNA.

In November, Federal Judge Bruce Howe Hendricks of the United States District Court for the District of South Carolina issued three temporary injunctions against the ACNA on behalf of the JAFC. On December 22, the JAFC amended its legal filing against the ACNA to include new charges of conspiracy, theft of proprietary information, and theft of personnel records. The same month, some bishops of the JAFC launched a new denomination, the Anglican Reformed Catholic Church. The new denomination's website initially described the denomination as being affiliated with the Union of Scranton, an Old Catholic communion group whose holy orders are recognized by the Roman Catholic Church. However, representatives from the Polish National Catholic Church, a subsidiary of the Union of Scranton, denied this affiliation.

In September 2026, Judge Hendricks granted the ACNA's motion to dismiss the JAFC nonprofit's lawsuit, finding that to make a decision would require the civil court to rule on internal ecclesiastical matters not subject to its jurisdiction.

== Activities ==
The JAFC endorses chaplains serving in the Armed Forces, along with those needing professional endorsement for ministry in hospitals, prisons and workplaces. While chaplains in the Episcopal Church maintain canonical residency in an individual diocese, in the ACNA chaplains are resident within the SJAFC, which has allowed its bishop what the Institute on Religion and Democracy called "unprecedented control" over endorsed chaplains. The JAFC's canons centralize financial and operational control in the bishop, who also appoints the executive committee of the JAFC. Chaplains endorsed through JAFC must maintain good standing by tithing to the JAFC, and they can lose good standing by discussing a transfer to another endorser without the permission of the bishop.

In addition to endorsing ordained chaplains, the JAFC also trained and endorsed commissioned lay chaplains for service in areas where ordination was not required. To ensure their oversight, commissioned lay chaplains were required to be part of the JAFC's Order of St. Martin of Tours.

=== Financial support ===
In 2015, 92% of the JAFC's budget was funded by its endorsed chaplains through tithes and gifts. This model remained in place at the time of the JAFC's disaffiliation from the ACNA, with all endorsed clergy required by the organization to give 10% of their income directly to the JAFC. The JAFC's annual income of $1.2 million as of 2025 came mainly from chaplains' tithes. According to The Living Church, Jones has threatened JAFC chaplains with loss of endorsement—which would result in a loss of a military chaplaincy job—and ecclesiastical discipline if tithe payments were missed.

=== Government affairs ===
Prior to its separation from the ACNA, the JAFC operated the Anglican Office for Government and International Affairs (AOGIA) on behalf of the ACNA. In 2022, the AOGIA arranged for the evacuation to the United States of Iranian Anglican priest Hekmat Salimi and his family from Turkey. The Salimis were under a deportation order back to Iran, where they may have faced execution. In 2023, the AOGIA co-founded the Save Karabakh Coalition calling for an end to U.S. military aid to Azerbaijan and for humanitarian aid to the Republic of Artsakh.

== Leadership ==
In addition to Jones as bishop ordinary of the JAFC, there have been several suffragan bishops. Mark Nordstrom and Michael Williams were elected by the ACNA College of Bishops and consecrated in April 2018. They served until retirement in 2025, when they were replaced by Jay Cayangyang and Marshall MacClellan.
