= Mark Nordstrom =

American bishop of the Anglican Church in North America

The Right Reverend Mark Nordstrom
- Bishop Suffragan of the Jurisdiction of the Armed Forces and Chaplaincy
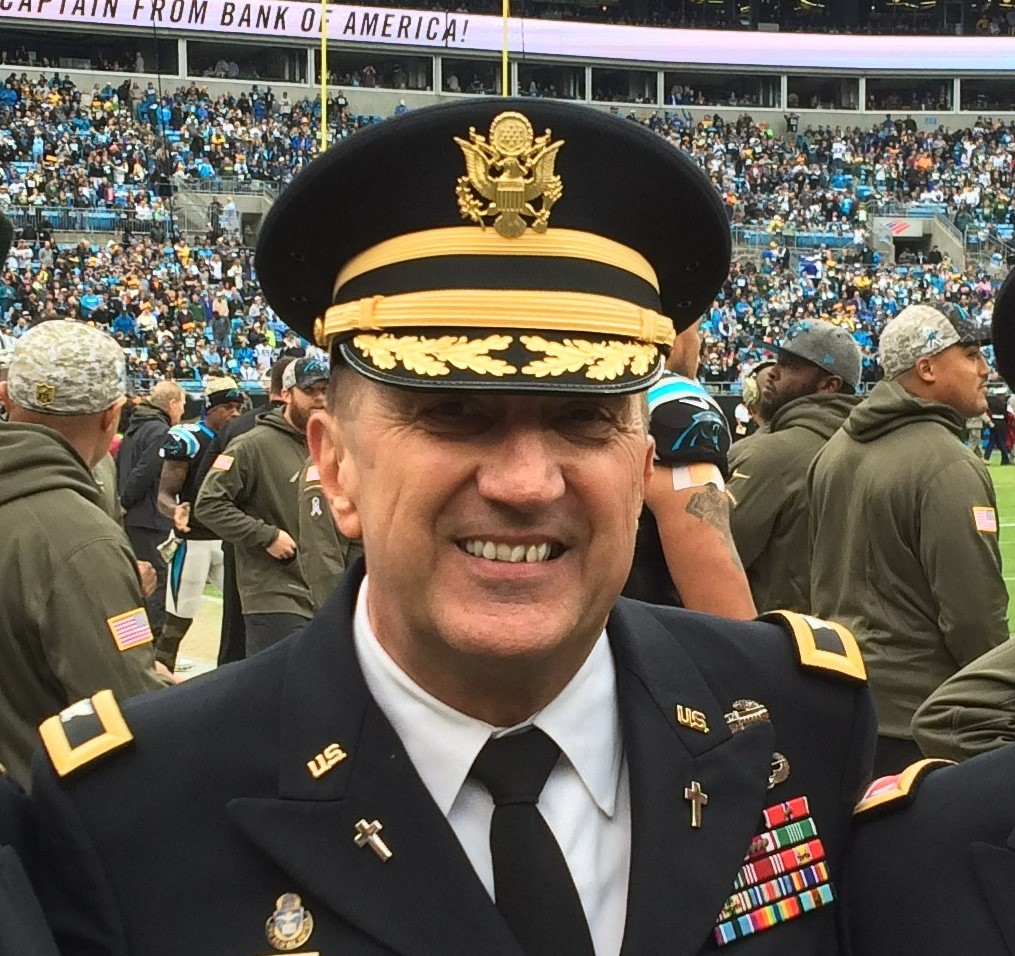
- Church: Anglican Church in North America
- Diocese: Armed Forces and Chaplaincy
- In office: 2018–2025

Orders
- Ordination: 2010
- Consecration: April 12, 2018 by Foley Beach

Personal details
- Education: Dallas Theological Seminary

Mark Nordstrom is an American bishop of the Anglican Church in North America. A retired U.S. Army chaplain, from 2018 to 2025 he was bishop suffragan in the ACNA's Special Jurisdiction of the Armed Forces and Chaplaincy (SJAFC).

== Early life and education ==
Nordstrom joined the Army at age 18 and served for six years as a military policeman, followed by six years serving in two civilian churches. Nordstrom married Christine Patrizio in 1979, with whom he had three children and six grandchildren. His two sons also served in the Army.

In 1987, Nordstrom entered ordained ministry in Baptist churches. He graduated from Dallas Theological Seminary with an M.Th. and holds undergraduate degrees in aviation science and general studies.

== Chaplaincy career ==
In 1990, Nordstrom returned to military service under a direct commission as a chaplain. His assignments as a chaplain included light infantry battalions, a field artillery battalion and a mechanized infantry brigade. He was also an observer controller at the Combat Maneuver Training Center in Hohenfels, Germany, and in the Combat Developments Directorate of the U.S. Army Chaplain Center and School in Fort Jackson, South Carolina. He later served as operations officer for the Command Chaplain, United States Army Europe and 7th Army; force management officer for the Army Chief of Chaplains at the Pentagon; and director of training and leader development at the U.S. Army Chaplain Center and School.

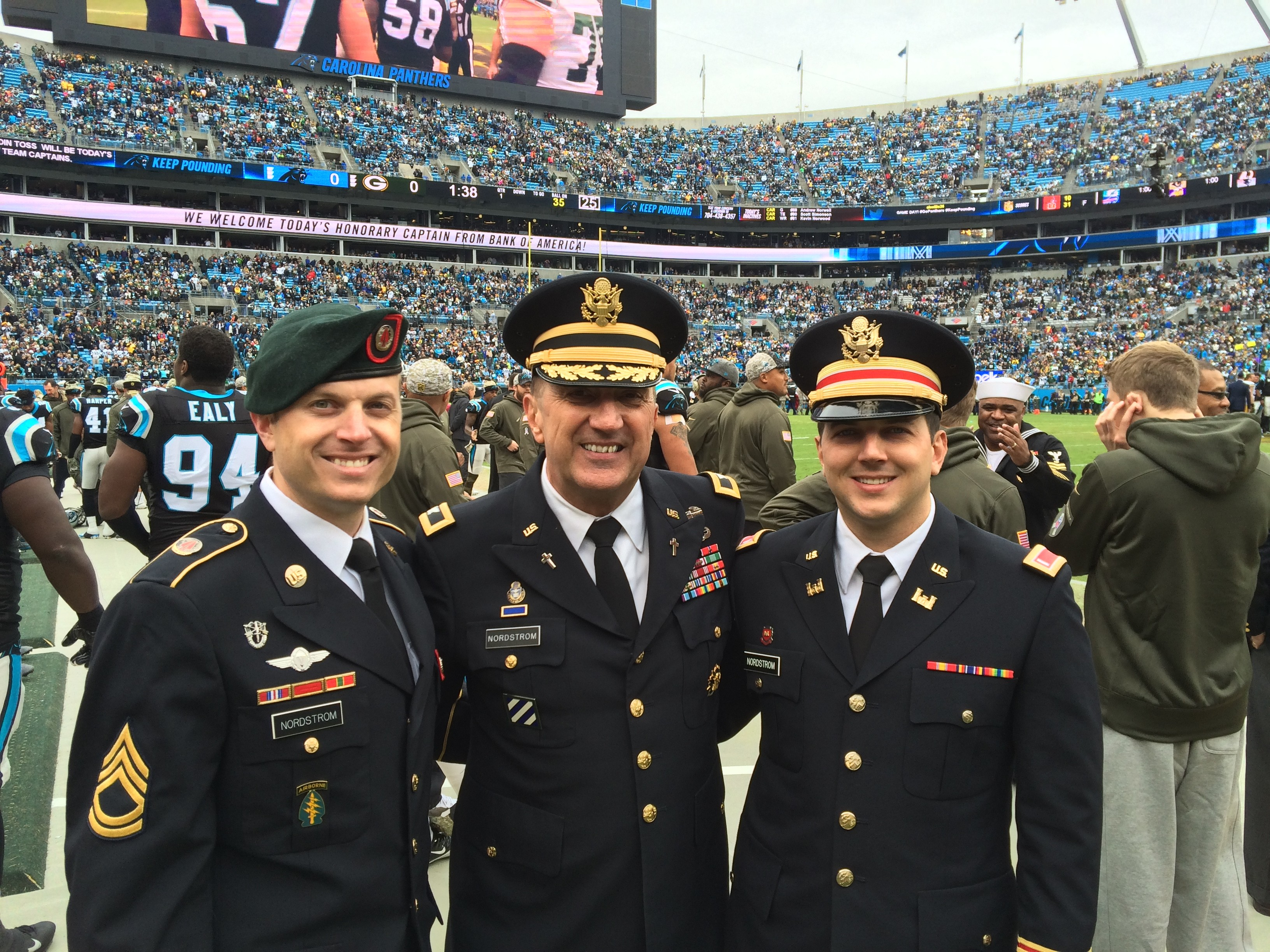
The Rev. Col. Mark Nordstrom, U.S. Army, retired (center), with his sons, Sgt. 1st Class Philip Nordstrom (left) and 1st Lt. Joel Nordstrom (right)

Nordstrom served in joint relief operations for Hurricane Iniki, and he deployed as a brigade chaplain for two tours during Operation Iraqi Freedom, once with the initial entry forces. He received the Presidential Unit Citation, the Bronze Star Medal with Oak Leaf Cluster, the Meritorious Service Medal with three Oak Leaf Clusters, the Army Achievement Medal, Good Conduct Medal, the National Defense Service Medal with two bronze stars, the Iraq Campaign Medal with three campaign stars, the Global War on Terrorism Expeditionary Medal, Global War on Terrorism Service Medal, Humanitarian Service Medal, the Overseas Service Ribbon with numeral four, the Hawaii National Guard Medal For Merit, the Combat Action Badge, and the Air Assault Badge. He retired from the Army with the rank of colonel.

== Episcopacy ==
In 2010, Nordstrom was ordained in the Anglican Church in North America. During his Pentagon service, he also served as volunteer clergy at The Falls Church Anglican. After his retirement, he joined the staff of the SJAFC as vicar general. Nordstrom was consecrated as SJAFC bishop suffragan alongside Michael Williams on April 12, 2018, in Birmingham, Alabama. As bishop suffragan, Nordstrom oversees pastoral care and support for chaplains and their family members. Like other SJAFC bishops, his canonical residence was in the Church of Nigeria North American Mission until 2021, when the SJAFC completed the canonical process for removing its residence in the Church of Nigeria and becoming canonically resident in the ACNA.

Williams and Nordstrom retired in 2025 and were replaced by newly elected bishops Jay Cayangyang and Marshall MacClellan. After retiring in 2025, he was inhibited from ministry in the ACNA in January 2026. He was indicted on canonical charges in the ACNA in May 2026, although by that point he had joined the breakaway Anglican Reformed Catholic Church founded by former ACNA chaplaincy bishop Derek Jones.
