= Michael Williams (bishop) =

American bishop of the Anglican Church in North America

The Right Reverend Michael R. Williams
- Bishop Suffragan of the Jurisdiction of the Armed Forces and Chaplaincy
- Church: Anglican Church in North America; Anglican Reformed Catholic Church
- Diocese: Armed Forces and Chaplaincy
- In office: 2018–2025

Orders
- Ordination: August 1989 (diaconate); September 1990 (priesthood)
- Consecration: April 12, 2018 by Foley Beach

Personal details
- Education: Iowa State University; Trinity School for Ministry

Michael R. Williams is an American Anglican bishop. A retired U.S. Air Force chaplain, he served from 2018 to 2025 as bishop suffragan in the Anglican Church in North America's Special Jurisdiction of the Armed Forces and Chaplaincy (SJAFC).

== Biography ==
Williams married his wife, Becky, in 1976, and they have three daughters and five granddaughters. In 1977, he received his B.A. in political science from Iowa State University. He joined the U.S. Air Force as an officer after graduation.

After receiving a call to ordained ministry, he attended Trinity School for Ministry and was ordained to the priesthood in the Episcopal Church in North Pole, Alaska, while serving at Eielson Air Force Base. From 1991 to 1995, he served at St. Paul's Episcopal Church in Grand Forks, North Dakota. Williams joined the chaplaincy of the Air Force in 1995 and served until his retirement in 2009, at which time he joined the staff of the ACNA's Jurisdiction of the Armed Forces and Chaplaincy.

He was consecrated as bishop suffragan alongside Mark Nordstrom on April 12, 2018, in Birmingham, Alabama. Williams serves as director of education, training, and formation for the Anglican chaplains. Like other JAFC bishops, his canonical residence was in the Church of Nigeria North American Mission until 2021, when the JAFC completed the canonical process for removing its residence in the Church of Nigeria and becoming canonically resident in the ACNA. Since 2009, Williams has also been a priest or bishop-in-residence at St. George's Anglican Church in Colorado Springs.

Williams and Nordstrom retired in 2025 and were replaced by newly elected bishops Jay Cayangyang and Marshall MacClellan. After retiring in 2025, he was inhibited from ministry in the ACNA in January 2026. He was indicted on canonical charges in the ACNA in May 2026, although by that point he had joined the breakaway Anglican Reformed Catholic Church founded by former ACNA chaplaincy bishop Derek Jones.
