= Jurisdiction of the Armed Forces and Chaplaincy =

Jurisdiction of the Armed Forces and Chaplaincy may refer to:

- Special Jurisdiction of the Armed Forces and Chaplaincy, a jurisdiction of the Anglican Church in North America
- Jurisdiction of the Armed Forces and Chaplaincy (organization), a nonprofit organization formerly affiliated with the ACNA
