= Steve Wood =

American Anglican archbishop (born 1963)

The Most Reverend Steve Wood
- Archbishop of the Anglican Church in North America; Bishop of the Carolinas
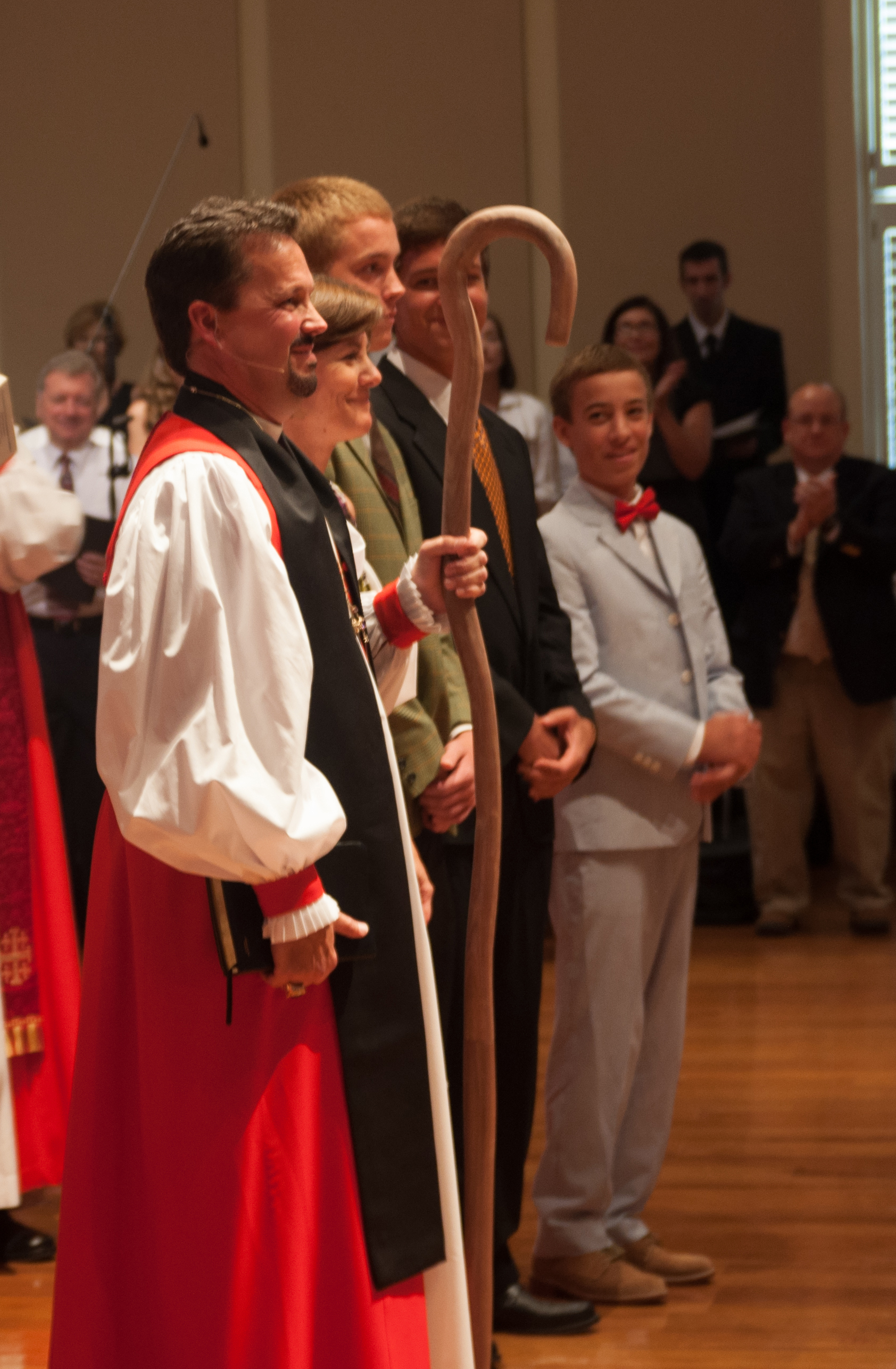
- Wood with family members at his 2012 consecration as bishop
- Church: Anglican Church in North America
- Diocese: Carolinas
- In office: 2024–present (inhibited, 2025–present)
- Predecessor: Foley Beach
- Other posts: Bishop of the Carolinas (2012–present); Rector, St. Andrew's Church (2000–2025)

Orders
- Ordination: June 15, 1991 (diaconate); February 1, 1992 (priesthood) by James R. Moodey
- Consecration: August 25, 2012 by Robert Duncan

Personal details
- Born: October 12, 1963 (age 63) Cleveland, Ohio

Ordination history
History
Diaconal ordination
- Ordained by: James R. Moodey
Priestly ordination
- Ordained by: James R. Moodey
Episcopal consecration
- Consecrated by: Robert Duncan
Episcopal succession
Bishops consecrated by Steve Wood as principal consecrator
- Phil Ashey: March 29, 2025
- Jay Cayangyang: June 21, 2025
- Marshall MacClellan: June 21, 2025
- Marc Steele: August 16, 2025
- Jeff Bailey: September 27, 2025

Stephen Dwain Wood (born October 12, 1963) is an American Anglican bishop. Since June 2024, he has been archbishop of the Anglican Church in North America (ACNA), which was formed in the late 2000s as part of the Anglican realignment. In addition to being archbishop, he is also the sitting bishop of the ACNA's Diocese of the Carolinas. He was rector of St. Andrew's Church in Mount Pleasant, South Carolina for 25 years.

Wood was born in Ohio and entered ordained ministry in the Episcopal Church. He became rector of St. Andrew's in 2000, growing it into what The Post and Courier called "one of the Lowcountry's biggest church success stories." In 2010, he led St. Andrew's out of the Episcopal Diocese of South Carolina in 2012 and became vicar general of the Diocese of the Carolinas as it formed. He was made a bishop in August 2012.

In July 2024, Wood was elected the third archbishop and primate of the ACNA. His tenure as primate has been marked by several controversies, including the disaffiliation of the Jurisdiction of the Armed Forces and Chaplaincy from the ACNA following Wood's inhibition of its bishop. In October 2025, Wood became the first ACNA archbishop to have a presentment filed against him, when a complaint filed by 11 clergy and laypeople alleged that Wood had engaged in sexual misconduct, plagiarism of sermons and bullying of church staff. Wood said he did not believe the accusations had merit. In November 2025, he was suspended from engaging in ordained ministry as archbishop and diocesan bishop while the investigation proceeded.

== Early life and career ==
Wood was born in Cleveland, Ohio, and grew up in Wickliffe, Ohio. He received his B.A. from Cleveland State University in 1986 and his M.Div. from Virginia Theological Seminary in 1991, after which he was ordained to the priesthood in the Episcopal Church. Wood served at Episcopal churches in Ohio until being called in 2000 as rector of St. Andrew's, Mount Pleasant, which was then a parish of the Episcopal Diocese of South Carolina.

Under Wood's leadership, St. Andrews was described as "one of the Lowcountry's biggest church success stories", growing to a membership of more than 3,000 and planting new churches in Goose Creek, downtown Charleston, and the Park Circle area of North Charleston. In 2006, Wood was one of three finalists in the election for bishop of South Carolina; ultimately Mark Lawrence was elected. In 2010, St. Andrew's voted by a large margin to leave the Episcopal Church and affiliate with the Diocese of the Holy Spirit under the leadership of Bishop John Guernsey in the Anglican Church in North America.

== Bishop of the Carolinas ==
Shortly after joining ACNA, Wood became involved with efforts to create the Diocese of the Carolinas, which was formed with 14 congregations with an average Sunday attendance of over 2,700. According to its official policy, the Diocese of the Carolinas "has supported the ordination of women as deacons and priests in the church, with the provision that women may not serve in the office of rector" since its inception in 2010.

Wood served as vicar general of the diocese while it was in formation and, in 2012, he was elected to serve as its first bishop. Wood was consecrated on August 25, 2012, at St. Andrew's by Archbishop Robert Duncan. Co-consecrators included Archbishop-elect Stanley Ntagali of Uganda and Bishops Guernsey, Roger Ames, and Alphonza Gadsden.

In April 2018, significant portions of the ministry center and office spaces at St. Andrew's were consumed by a structure fire. Local authorities were able prevent the fire from spreading to the historic chapel at St. Andrew's.

Wood was hospitalized with COVID-19 and placed on a ventilator in an intensive care unit at East Cooper Medical Center in Mount Pleasant, South Carolina in April 2020, toward the beginning of the COVID-19 pandemic. Wood lost 30 pounds from the experience but eventually made a full recovery. In May 2020, Wood joined three other bishops in the ACNA—Jim Hobby of Pittsburgh, Todd Hunter of C4SO, and Stewart Ruch of the Upper Midwest—in authoring a letter concerning the murder of George Floyd. In the letter, Wood and the other bishops called the murder "an affront to God" and wrote: "We mourn alongside the wider Black community for whom this tragedy awakens memories of their own traumas and the larger history of systemic oppression that still plagues this country."

== Archbishop of the Anglican Church in North America ==
On June 22, 2024, Wood was elected by the ACNA college of bishops to succeed Foley Beach as the province's third archbishop. He formally took office on June 28, at the conclusion of the ACNA's provincial assembly. He was invested as archbishop in Mount Pleasant on October 30, 2024, in the presence of fellow Global Fellowship of Confessing Anglicans primates Samy Fawzy, Azad Marshall, Laurent Mbanda, Miguel Uchôa and Tito Zavala, along with Archbishops Kanishka Raffel and Peter Akinola.

The first year of Wood's tenure saw significant turmoil within the ACNA. In November 2024, a Washington Post investigative report revealed that the Diocese of the Mid-Atlantic had admonished leaders of The Falls Church Anglican for not opening an investigation into allegations of abuse by a former youth minister when they were first informed. In May 2025, Presiding Bishop Ray Sutton of the Reformed Episcopal Church, a founding member of the ACNA, granted a one-year ministry license to provocative priest and right-wing social media figure Calvin Robinson, whose license in the Anglican Catholic Church had been revoked after ending a speech with a gesture his opponents characterized as a Nazi salute. Wood issued a public statement expressing concern with the licensure: "I have concerns about Rev. Robinson’s ability to uphold the full commitments of our Anglican tradition, and his ability to model the Christ-like virtues of peace, patience, gentleness, goodness, and love." Wood added: "I do not personally believe the Rev. Robinson is a good representative of the Anglican Church in North America." The following day, Sutton withdrew the license he had granted to Robinson just 10 days earlier.

In September 2025, repeated clashes over misconduct allegations and ecclesiastical controversies resulted in the Jurisdiction of the Armed Forces and Chaplaincy (JAFC), the nonprofit overseeing endorsements of ACNA chaplains, disaffiliating from the ACNA. The ACNA claimed it had received multiple "credible complaints" alleging "abuse of ecclesiastical power" but not involving "any accusations of physical or sexual abuse or doctrinal concerns" by JAFC Bishop Derek Jones. At least six complainants alleged wrongful use of church discipline, at least two alleged interference with external employment, at least one alleged improper release of a priest from orders, and six alleged infliction of “financial, emotional, and psychological stress" by Jones. Wood told Jones that a third party would investigate the allegations and inhibited Jones from ministry. Jones responded by saying that he and the JAFC nonprofit had withdrawn from the ACNA. After the ACNA College of Bishops elected Bishop Jay Cayangyang to oversee what remained of the chaplaincy jurisdiction in the ACNA, the JAFC nonprofit sued the ACNA, alleging trademark infringement and "unfair commercial competition."

Weeks later, on October 23, 2025, the Washington Post reported that Wood was the subject of a formal ecclesiastical presentment involving claims of sexual harassment, abuse of power, and plagiarism—the first time an ACNA archbishop had been presented for misconduct. According to the Post, a former children’s ministry director at St. Andrew's accused Wood of forcibly touching her and attempting to kiss her in his office in April 2024 and alleged that Wood gave her thousands of dollars from his discretionary "mercy fund" before the alleged kiss. Other complainants alleged that Wood had publicly shamed and cursed at colleagues and that he had plagiarized sermons.

Wood declined to answer specific questions about the accusations, which were being reviewed by the ACNA's provincial dean, Bishop Ray Sutton, to determine whether to convene a board of inquiry that would determine whether to proceed to a trial. Despite not answering detailed questions, Wood denied the allegations, stating that he believed they were without merit and that he trusted ACNA's disciplinary processes to "bring clarity and truth." On November 3, Wood announced his immediate retirement as rector of St. Andrew's and began a paid leave of absence during the proceedings triggered by the presentment. His canonical duties as archbishop were assumed by Sutton with the assistance of Julian Dobbs, and his duties in the Diocese of the Carolinas were assumed by Terrell Glenn. That month, the presentment was modified to include an additional woman's allegation of sexual harassment.

On November 15, Sutton stepped down as dean of the province, citing health reasons, and he appointed Julian Dobbs to serve as dean and thus acting archbishop. Dobbs immediately inhibited Wood from ordained ministry with the consent of five of the most senior ACNA bishops for a renewable 60-day period. On 12 December 2025, an Anglican Church in North American Board of Inquiry recorded its judgment that three charges should proceed against Wood: "1. Violation of Ordination Vows (Canon IV.2.1.3); 2. Conduct giving just cause for scandal or offense, including the abuse of ecclesiastical power (Canon IV.2.1.4); and 3. Sexual Immorality (Canon IV.2.1.6)." These charges will now proceed to ecclesiastical trial, which is scheduled for October 2026.

== Personal life ==
Wood married Jacqueline Elizabeth Benner on February 1, 1986. They have four sons and eight grandchildren.

== Notes ==
Religious titles
Preceded by Terrell L. Glenn Jr.	Rector of St. Andrew's Church; 2000–2025	Vacant
New title	Bishop of the Carolinas; Inhibited since November 2025; 2012–present	Incumbent
Preceded by Foley Beach	Archbishop of the Anglican Church in North America; Inhibited since November 2025; 2024–present	Incumbent
