= JAFC =

JAFC may refer to:

- Sherwood JAFC
- Jacksonville Armada FC
- Journal of Agricultural and Food Chemistry
- Jurisdiction of the Armed Forces and Chaplaincy
