= Church of the Resurrection (Wheaton, Illinois) =

Anglican church in Wheaton, Illinois, U.S.

Coordinates: 41.8688°N 88.1208°W

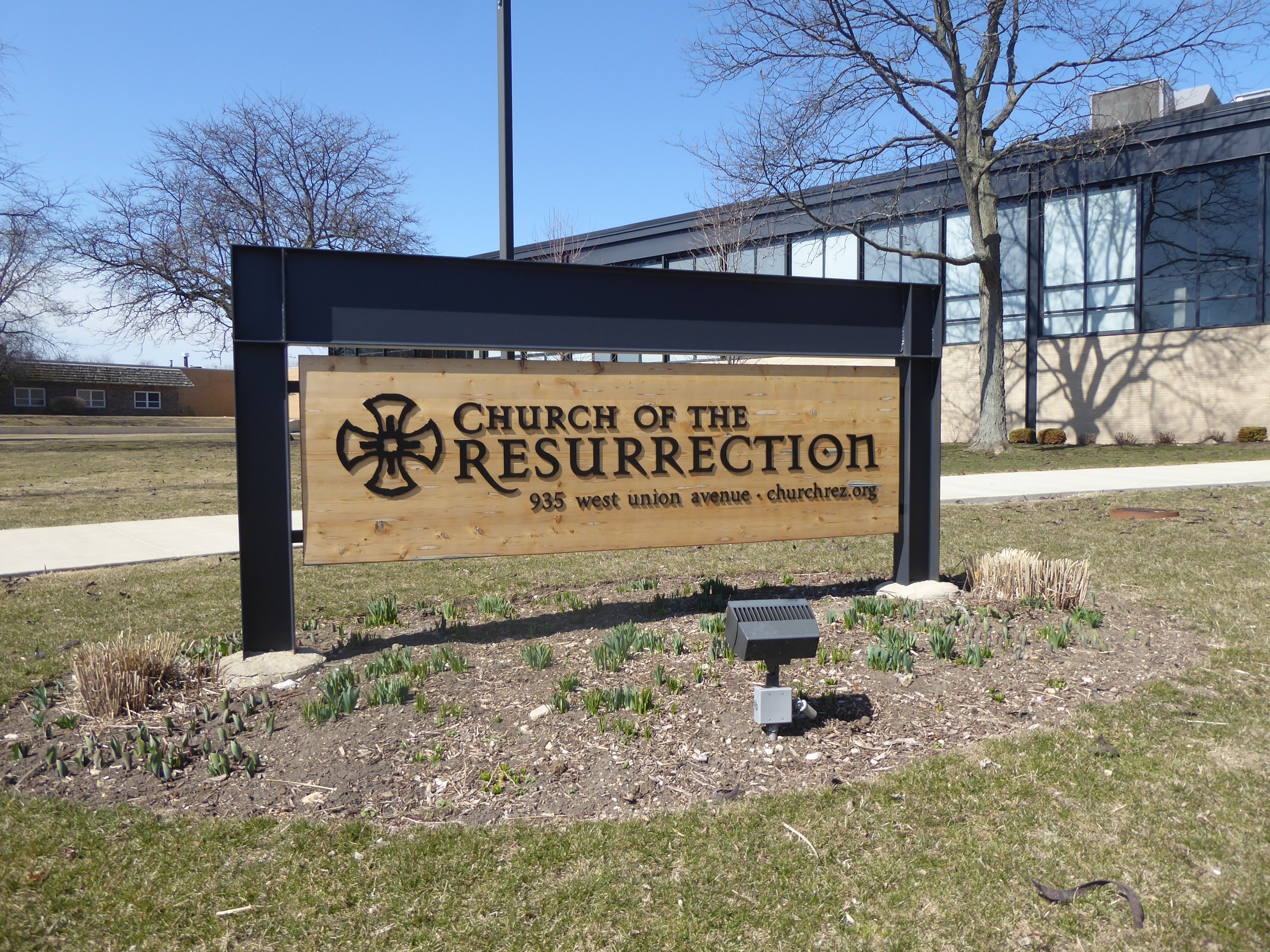
- Church of the Resurrection
- Location: Wheaton, Illinois
- Country: United States
- Denomination: Anglican Church in North America
- Website: churchrez.org

History
- Founded: 1954
- Dedicated: 2011

Architecture
- Style: Modern

Administration
- Diocese: Upper Midwest

Clergy
- Bishop: The Rt. Rev. Stewart Ruch
- Vicar: The Rev. Brett Crull
- Dean: The Rev. Matthew Woodley

The Church of the Resurrection (known colloquially as "Rez") is an Anglican church in Wheaton, Illinois. It is the cathedral parish of the Anglican Diocese of the Upper Midwest, whose first and current bishop was Rez's longtime pastor. Since its founding in 1954, the church has had a significant and complex role in the Anglican realignment in the United States, the charismatic renewal movement and the growth in the so-called "Canterbury Trail" of evangelical Protestants moving toward Anglicanism.

== History ==
Amid the postwar growth of the Chicago suburbs, Church of the Resurrection was planted in West Chicago on Palm Sunday in 1954 by Trinity Episcopal Church in Wheaton. It was part of the Episcopal Diocese of Chicago. Its first rector was the Rev. Richard Winkler, who was a leader in the 20th century charismatic renewal movement in the Episcopal Church. In 1963, the church built a new brick building on Neltnor Boulevard in West Chicago on the banks of the West Branch DuPage River. The building was designed by Edward Dart, a prominent Midwestern mid-century modern architect.

In 1987, the Rev. William Beasley was appointed rector. A bastion of charismatic evangelicalism within the Episcopal Church and the center of a significant healing prayer ministry, Rez was growing numerically. Rez's location near evangelical Wheaton College and other evangelical institutions in Carol Stream and Wheaton was drawing in evangelicals on the Canterbury Trail, such as Christianity Today editor Mark Galli, who was a member of Rez for a time. At the same time, a gulf was growing between Rez's evangelical theology and the mainstream theological liberalism of the Episcopal Church. In 1993, Beasley and the Rez vestry informed Bishop Frank Griswold that they were "scandalized" by the Diocese of Chicago's position on the authority of scripture and by their perception that "priests practicing homosexual behavior were given influential positions."

=== Split from Episcopal Church ===
In 1993, more than 400 Rez attendees and Beasley disassociated the Church of the Resurrection from the Diocese of Chicago. However, due to Episcopal Church policy and the Dennis Canon, they did not retain the West Chicago property. A continuing group of just 11 congregants continued as Church of the Resurrection under the leadership of the Rev. George Koch, but attendance recovered to around 300 by 1995. The Episcopal Church-affiliated Church of the Resurrection continued until 2007, when it too left the Episcopal Church over doctrinal concerns and vacated the West Chicago property. (It took the name of Resurrection Anglican Church and joined another ACNA diocese, the Diocese of Pittsburgh, and eventually renamed itself New Jerusalem House of Prayer to distinguish itself from the Wheaton-based Rez.)

The much larger Beasley-led church began meeting at Glenbard West High School in Glen Ellyn, where it would remain for 18 years. In 1999, Beasley was succeeded by the Rev. Stewart Ruch as rector. As the Anglican realignment continued, Rez affiliated with the Anglican Mission in America, which claimed connection to the Anglican Communion through the Anglican Church of Rwanda.

=== Joining ACNA ===
Via AMIA, a founding member during the early days, Rez joined the Anglican Church in North America, initially affiliating with the Diocese of Pittsburgh. Rez was the site in April 2013 where 117 ACNA priests and laity met to form the Diocese of the Upper Midwest. The diocese was approved by ACNA's Provincial Council in June 2013, and Ruch was consecrated as the first bishop of the Upper Midwest on September 28, 2013.

In 2010, a Rez member found a vacant Alcoa warehouse on the west side of Wheaton and bought it at auction on behalf of the church. By May 2011, Rez owned the building, and the building was dedicated in December 2012 by Bishop Frank Lyons. In October 2015, the Upper Midwest Diocese designated Rez as its cathedral parish. Ruch was succeeded as rector (and dean) by the Very Rev. Steve Williamson in 2020.

Since 2004, Rez has planted numerous Anglican churches: Church of the Cross in Minneapolis (2004); Light of Christ Anglican in Kenosha, Wisconsin (2007); Immanuel Anglican in Chicago (2013); City of Light Anglican in Aurora, Illinois (2015); Christ Church in Madison, Wisconsin (2018); and Church of the Incarnation in Neenah, Wisconsin (2020). Rez leaders, including former rector Beasley and Ruch, were also leaders in the Greenhouse Movement, a church planting organization that operated under the auspices of the Upper Midwest Diocese. Rez also launched Aviva, a Spanish-speaking congregation in its Wheaton facility.

== Architecture ==
=== West Chicago ===
Rez's West Chicago building, designed by Edward D. Dart, was described by Landmarks Chicago as "an excellent example of a small-scale religious structure [with] a simple barn-like form with four corner piers supporting a steeply pitched wood-shingle roof. Designed to mimic an old mill which once stood on the property, the building sits nestled within the sloping landscape abutting the DuPage River." After 2007, the diocese left the property vacant, listing it and its 3.8 acre lot for $1.2 million. With several other Dart-designed buildings being demolished or seriously altered—including Emmanuel Presbyterian Church in Pilsen and Dart’s own house in Barrington—the Rez building was ranked in 2009 as one of the Chicago area's "most endangered" structures. The building was not landmarked, however, and between June 2016 and April 2017, the church was demolished.

=== Wheaton ===
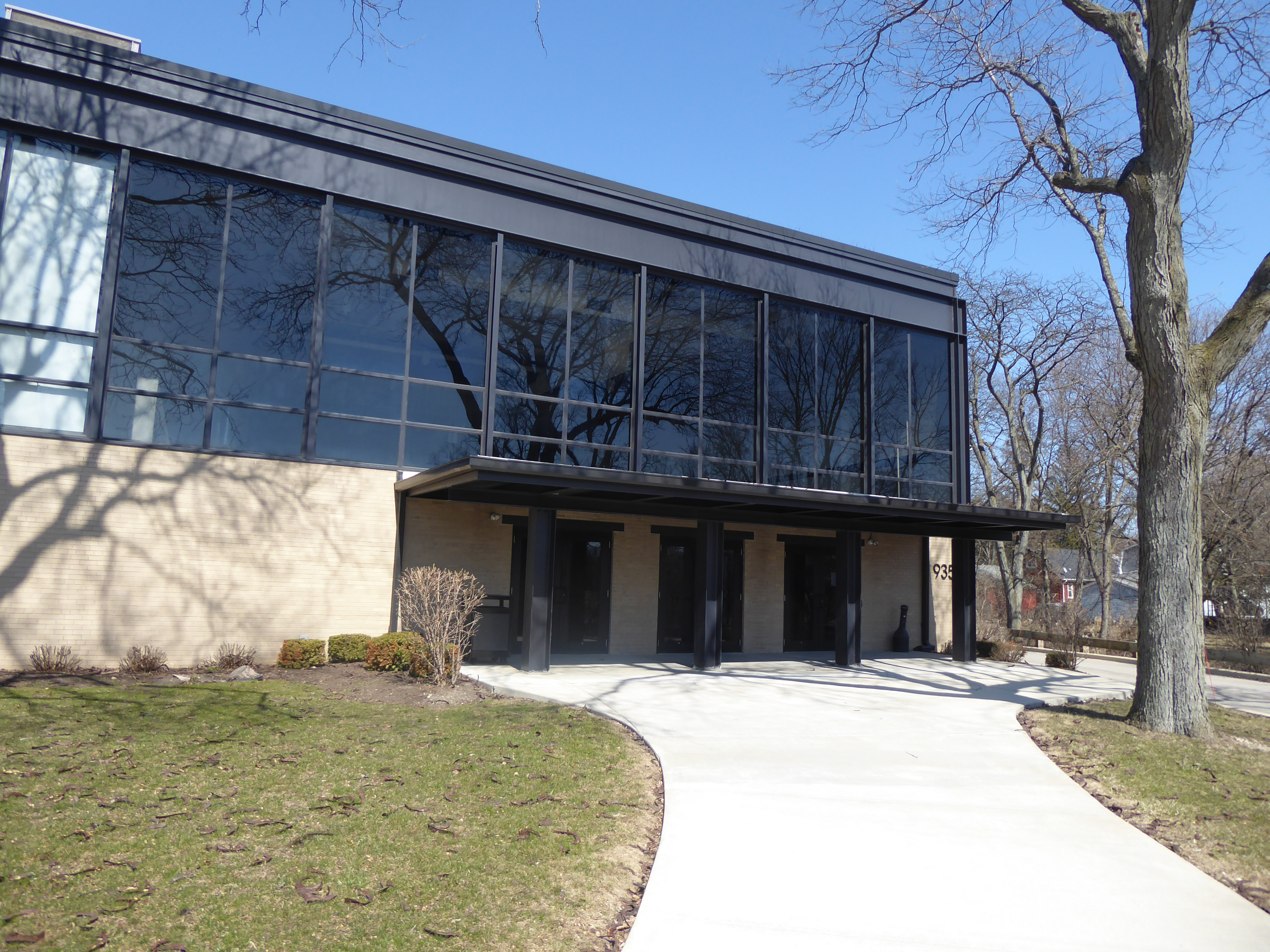
Rez's main entrance

Meanwhile, the present-day Rez building in Wheaton began as a 70,000-square-foot warehouse. Working to a design by Skiffington Architects, Baldridge & Associates Structural Engineering created a truss using existing roof framing and two existing interior columns to expand the column-free sanctuary space in the warehouse from the pre-existing 38-foot grid to 114 feet.

== Churchmanship ==
Church of the Resurrection worship services have been described by news reports as "high octane" and "spirit-filled and Bible-based but centered on ancient liturgy," featuring a "combination of charismatic preaching and dramatic liturgy with priests wearing traditional robes and reading from the Book of Common Prayer." The blend of high church and evangelical elements is highlighted in the Rez service for the Easter vigil, a four-hour service featuring art, elaborate decorations, dance, dramatic scriptural readings, baptism and Holy Communion. The vigil began in the 1980s under Beasley's leadership; Beasley had a background in theater and incorporated actors, visual artists and musicians in the vigil. In 2011, prior to Rez's acquisition of its current building, a record 1,500 people attended the Easter vigil held in Edman Chapel at Wheaton College.

== Controversies ==
=== Sexual abuse and mishandling ===
In June 2019, a former member of and volunteer at Rez, Mark Rivera, was arrested and charged with felony child sexual assault and abuse of a nine-year-old girl. Rivera had known the girl and her family through Christ Our Light Anglican Church in Big Rock, Illinois. Christ Our Light was planted through the Greenhouse Network by Rez members, including Rivera and the mother of the alleged abuse victim. Rivera served as a lay catechist at the church plant, a role that involved overseeing service details, serving Holy Communion, mentoring youth and preaching. Since these charges, nine additional people have made abuse allegations against Rivera, including child sexual abuse, grooming, rape and assault.

The nine-year-old's mother said that Rivera became part of the Christ Our Light church plant because he had held leadership roles at Rez. According to news reports, he attended Rez from the mid-1990s until Christ Our Light was planted in 2013 and served at Rez as a prayer minister, preschool volunteer, youth leader and small group leader. “My mother was the one who invited Mark and his family to move to Big Rock, to live on my childhood home property, after knowing and serving alongside him as a volunteer leader at the church for several years,” she said in a statement published by Religion News Service. “My extended family members, who lent additional trust and credibility to Mark Rivera, met him through Church of the Resurrection.”

The mother of the alleged abuse victim returned to Rez in 2019. She claimed to have informed Rez leadership of the allegations against Rivera immediately. According to news reports, the pastors of Rez provided a therapy referral but did not meet with her until a month after she returned to attending Rez. At that time, the mother informed a Rez deacon that she had heard additional allegations from Rez members against Rivera. According to news reports, the deacon said she would report the allegations to Ruch and said she would provide "personalized pastoral care plans" for each member of the alleged victim's family, although these were not delivered.

After the allegations went viral on social media in 2021, the focus of subsequent investigations has been on the response of Ruch (who took a leave of absence to facilitate the investigation) and other leaders in the Upper Midwest Diocese. The Rez deacon told media that she could not say whether she reported the mother's allegations to Ruch because of the ongoing investigations. In May 2022, the alleged victim's mother filed a lawsuit through counsel Boz Tchividjian, a litigator who handles sex abuse cases against religious organizations, against the now-defunct Christ Our Light Anglican. The lawsuit also named Rez, the Greenhouse Movement, the Upper Midwest Diocese and the ACNA as respondents in the discovery process.

In 2023, 45 priests and lay persons from Bp. Ruch's Anglican Diocese of the Upper Midwest and other Anglican Church in North America churches filed a presentment, or set of allegations, against Ruch.The presentment alleged that Ruch welcomed men with criminal histories into Church of the Resurrection without properly notifying the congregation, including Nephtali Matta and John Hays.

=== Spiritual control ===
Also in 2021, individuals began to make public complaints about "spiritual hazing" and "a culture of censorship and controlling behavior," according to news reports. A couple who participated in Rez's church planting residency claimed they were "spiritually abused." Former members said that Rez leaders pressured them to remain in abusive relationships and change behaviors associated with LGBTQ identity. Those who voiced criticism of Rez leaders were denied leadership positions, news reports said. Due to these allegations, the ACNA launched a separate investigation by an outside law firm into "claims of abuse of ecclesiastical (i.e. church) power" in the diocese.
