= Order of St. Cuthbert =

Anglican religious order

The Order of St Cuthbert is an international Anglican monastic order that follows a historic Celtic monastic tradition and rule, which is similar to that of a Franciscan rule. The order currently has monastics in the United States, Canada, and Nigeria. Intentionality and certain disciplines have long been recognized for their value in aiding sojourners along the way of a monastic life. Prayer, fasting, community, work, and study are mainstays of a life consecrated to Christ and His Church. These disciplines, intentionally practiced, form the rule by which the members of the order's lives are guided. The Order of Saint Cuthbert is an Anglican religious community that invites every Christian to live in the sacred life they have been called.

== History ==
The order was founded in 2019 by the Reverend Canon Kenneth Gillespie, a United States Army Officer and Chaplain, along with a group of other Anglican Priests, Deacons, and Commissioned Chaplains serving in the Special Jurisdiction of the Armed Forces and Chaplaincy (JAFC) of the Church of Nigeria North American Mission (CONNAM)(formerly the Convocation of Anglicans in North America) and the Anglican Church in North America (ACNA). The order is under the oversight of the JAFC.

== Ministries ==
The Order offers a retreat home to Anglican clergy and their families in a highly secluded area of Starr Mountain in Tennessee, as well as a "place of rest" on a farm belonging to the Bishop of the Armed Forces and Chaplaincy located in Brierfield, Alabama. Additionally, several members of the Order are also engaged in what is termed "Special Pastoral Interventions," that is, deliverance ministry, on behalf of the ACNA. This is primarily due to the fact that a large number of the Order's monastics are specially trained and educated, and ecclesiastically endorsed, chaplains serving around the world. The Order is also committed to a "restoration" ministry providing counseling, mediation, and spiritual care to individuals and families in circumstances of estrangement and related difficulties.

== Vows ==
Monks of the Order follow four-fold vows of obedience, chastity, simplicity of life, and the protection and sanctity of life. In general, monks of the order are encouraged to develop their own ministries within their monastic vocation. They undergo periods of discernment and formation when entering the Order. The lives of the monastics revolve around a balance of prayer, fasting, penitence, community, work, and study.

=== Prayer ===
According to the Order, the sojourner's life is ordered around prayer. It is not an afterthought, or something to devote oneself to only when time is available. It is the first priority, after which all other priorities must be ordered. The day must begin and end with prayer. To aid in this, the dispersed members meet daily through video electronic communication to conduct the Morning and Evening offices found in the 2019 Book of Common Prayer.

=== Fasting ===
The Order follows a regular routine of fasting. In the tradition of the Church, monastics fast on all appointed days/seasons of fasting to include Wednesday and Friday of each week and excluding all appointed feast days. In the Christian tradition, a "day" of fasting begins following the evening meal on the day prior and continues until the next evening. Additionally, under the direction of the Bishop, monastics will commit to one extended fast (greater that three days) during Ember Days.

=== Penitence ===
The Order holds to a practice of regular confession and penitence believing that all Christians are called to be a penitent people. This is also in the liturgical tradition of the Anglican Church. Daily, with the aid of God the Holy Spirit, monastics of the order seek to examine and re-orient themselves in submission to the Lordship of Christ Jesus. Regularly throughout the year, for the sake of healing, members make use of auricular confession through a spiritual father, normally the abbott or bishop.

=== Community ===
It is through community that the Order believes one is aided in maturing in the Christian faith. Through Community, members are challenged, encouraged, inspired, and held accountable. As a community dispersed throughout the world, the Order is intentional about engagement with one another. Although, not easy, and perhaps requiring sacrifice, gathering is paramount to the religious life. A life consecrated to Christ is one lived communally with those who sojourn together as teachers, companions, and guides; soul friends or anam cara.

=== Work ===
Monastics in the Order believe that life is most fully lived integrated. Every action, every decision, every task, no matter the perceived significance, is an opportunity to worship God, and to recognize the lordship of Jesus. Humanity is called to be fruitful, to live the image of God in which created by joining in continued creation. As sojourners on the way, the standard of success with every job and task is only to please God. As current monastics of this Order are primarily ordained or commissioned clerics, this commitment is often carried out vocationally.

=== Study ===
Commitment to learning and wisdom for the sake of others is a known charism of the Celtic tradition of monasticism. Dedication to deep study and mastery of Holy Scripture, history, liturgy, and the disciplines of spiritual formation is considered to be both holy and useful. Many of the monastics of this community have advanced educational degrees to the doctorate level and the order does include adherents who are college and seminary professors.Many of the monastics of this community have advanced educational degrees to the doctorate level and the order does include adherents who are college and seminary professors.

== The Customs of the Order ==
The brothers of the order shall commit themselves to faithfully ordering their lives according the following customs and priorities:

-To live a life fully consecrated to Christ.

-To honor and advocate for life as stewards of God's creation.

-To pray the daily offices and pray for the brothers of the Order and for the Bishops of the Church.

-To keep the seasons and days of feasting and fasting according to the traditions of the Church, to include a regular practice of fasting every Wednesday and Friday throughout the year, except on those days specifically appointed as feast days.

-To make every effort to daily participate in the daily life of the community and to regularly connect as anam cara.

-To meditate regularly on the life and example of Saint Cuthbert and to read the fathers writings and saints lives of the Celtic, Gallican and Mozarabic traditions.

-To daily examination of conscience, and continuous reorientation to Christ Jesus as Lord through penitent confession.

-To work and study in order to further God's kingdom and bring about the renewal of the Church.
