= Special Jurisdiction of the Armed Forces and Chaplaincy =

Chaplaincy jurisdiction of the Anglican Church in North America

Location
- Ecclesiastical province: Anglican Church in North America

Statistics
- Parishes: 9 (2024)
- Members: 288 (2024)

Information
- Rite: Anglican

Current leadership
- Bishop ordinary: Jay Cayangyang

Website
- Official website

The Special Jurisdiction of the Armed Forces and Chaplaincy (SJAFC) is a jurisdiction of the Anglican Church in North America that provides canonical residence and endorsement for the ACNA's chaplains who require professional ecclesiastical endorsement. With more than 300 chaplains in 2024, 187 of them serving as active-duty military chaplains, the SJAFC was the principal endorser of Anglican military chaplains in the United States. Authorized by the ACNA's canons in 2014, the SJAFC was led by Bishop Derek Jones from its early years as a deanery of the Convocation of Anglicans in North America.

In 2025, amid a dispute over charges of misconduct against him, Jones withdrew from the ACNA; a nonprofit organization he led, also named the Jurisdiction of the Armed Forces and Chaplaincy, claimed to have withdrawn from the ACNA as well. The ACNA did not recognize the withdrawal as affecting the SJAFC as described in its canons, and reconstituted its chaplaincy jurisdiction under Bishop Jay Cayangyang. As of 2026, the SJAFC claimed 150 affiliated chaplains.

== History ==
The SJAFC was created in 2008 as a deanery of the Convocation of Anglicans in North America, a group of former Episcopal churches, priests and laypeople who left the Episcopal Church during the Anglican realignment and were organized as an overseas mission of the Church of Nigeria. The chaplaincy deanery was initially under the oversight of CANA Suffragan Bishop David Bena. Shortly after the formation of the deanery, CANA Bishop Martyn Minns appointed Derek Jones, a bishop in the Communion of Evangelical Episcopal Churches and chaplain endorsing agent since 2007, as an assisting bishop to manage the deanery's administrative functions.

In 2014, the ACNA approved the constitution and canons of a new Special Jurisdiction of the Armed Forces and Chaplaincy to endorse and license its chaplains and formally constituted the SJAFC at the Provincial Assembly. Jones was affirmed that year as the first bishop of the JAFC. In 2015, the SJAFC had 153 endorsed chaplains as members. Meanwhile, Jones formed a nonprofit organization based in Montevallo, Alabama, that shared the name Jurisdiction of the Armed Forces and Chaplaincy (JAFC); it received 501(c)3 tax-exempt status in 2017.

While other jurisdictions that had maintained canonical "dual citizenship" with Nigeria, Rwanda, South America and Uganda had become canonically resident solely in the ACNA during the 2010s, the JAFC remained canonically resident in the Church of Nigeria because "a Canonical action remained unaddressed from several years back," according to ACNA Bishop Bill Atwood. The JAFC also continued to serve as the endorsing agent for Church of Nigeria North American Mission military chaplains. In 2021, the ACNA and the Church of Nigeria reached an agreement to transfer the JAFC to ACNA according to the ACNA canons. By 2024, the SJAFC had become the principal endorser of Anglican military chaplains in the United States with more than 300 chaplains, 187 of them serving as active-duty military chaplains. At this time, the ACNA endorsed roughly 10% of the 3,000 active-duty U.S. military chaplains. According to Baptist News Global, this gave "the small denomination a 'prestige multiplier,' granting its bishops access and influence in federal spaces that far outstrips their actual footprint in American religious life."

=== Controversy over Jones' disaffiliation ===
In September 2025, a significant conflict broke out in the ACNA that resulted in the JAFC nonprofit disaffiliating from the province and Jones leaving the ACNA. After reviewing what the ACNA called "multiple allegations of ecclesiastical abuse of power (deemed to be credible) against Bishop Jones," ACNA Archbishop Steve Wood on September 21 issued an admonition inhibiting Jones from ordained ministry. According to The Living Church, the complainants included "at least six people alleging wrongful use of disciplinary processes, at least three alleging backdating or fabrication of church documents, at least two alleging interference with external employment opportunities, at least one alleging wrongful release of a priest from orders, and six alleging infliction of 'financial, emotional, and psychological stress' upon persons in Jones’ care." The charges included alleged efforts by Jones to interfere with chaplains' employment after their departure from the JAFC and a "pay to play" tithing policy that required chaplains to donate a portion of their income to the JAFC nonprofit.

However, Jones claimed to Religion News Service that he had withdrawn from the ACNA on September 20 and was thus not subject to Wood's inhibition, and on September 22, the JAFC's executive committee issued a letter announcing that it had withdrawn the jurisdiction from the ACNA. In a recording of a video call with chaplains that the JAFC posted on YouTube, Jones denied that the allegations against him were legitimate (dismissing some as an expression of a "woke USA"), rejected Wood's ability to inhibit him and argued that the ACNA had delayed a purported revision to the canon establishing the SJAFC that would explicitly recognize a right to disaffiliate. Wood and the ACNA disputed the ability of the SJAFC to leave the province, arguing that it had been instituted as a "canonical ministry" of the ACNA and thus did not have the right of a diocese to withdraw. Meanwhile, a law firm hired by the JAFC insisted that it did have the ability to leave and sent a cease and desist letter to the ACNA stating that the ACNA does not have "any ecclesiastical or practical right of supervision over the Jurisdiction or its chaplaincy program." On September 25, the ACNA College of Bishops elected SJAFC Suffragan Bishop Jay Cayangyang bishop of the SJAFC. According to the ACNA, it initiated processes with the Department of Defense to ensure chaplains who wished to remain endorsed by ACNA could retain an uninterrupted endorsement, and a Department of War official told RNS that "chaplains should not be concerned about their certifications to serve."

The JAFC responded by filing a lawsuit in the Charleston Division of the United States District Court for the District of South Carolina on October 6, 2025, accusing the ACNA of multiple unfair business practices including alleged misrepresentation, false advertising, misappropriation, tortious interference, trademark infringement, defamation, and breach of the South Carolina Unfair Trade Practices Act. In September 2026, Judge Bruce Howe Hendricks granted the ACNA's motion to dismiss the JAFC nonprofit's lawsuit, finding that to make a decision would require the civil court to rule on internal ecclesiastical matters not subject to its jurisdiction.

As of February 2026, the SJAFC claimed 150 affiliated chaplains.

== Activities ==
The SJAFC endorses chaplains serving in the Armed Forces, along with those needing professional endorsement for ministry in hospitals, prisons and workplaces. While chaplains in the Episcopal Church maintain canonical residency in an individual diocese, in the ACNA chaplains are resident within the SJAFC, which has allowed its bishop what the Institute on Religion and Democracy called "unprecedented control" over endorsed chaplains. In addition to endorsing ordained chaplains, the SJAFC also trained and endorsed commissioned lay chaplains for service in areas where ordination was not required. To ensure their oversight, commissioned lay chaplains were required to be part of the SJAFC's Order of St. Martin of Tours.

== Leadership ==
In addition to Jones as the first bishop ordinary of the JAFC, there have been several suffragan bishops. Mark Nordstrom and Michael Williams were elected by the ACNA College of Bishops and consecrated in April 2018. They served until retirement in 2025, when they were replaced by Cayangyang and Marshall MacClellan. Following the withdrawal decision by the JAFC nonprofit, Cayangyang was elected bishop of the ACNA Special Jurisdiction. Cayangyang was formally installed as bishop in February 2026.
