= List of archbishops of the Anglican Church in North America =

This is a list of the archbishops and primates of the Anglican Church in North America. The Global Anglican Future Conference of 2008 called the Anglican Church in North America into being. After the Church was organized and constituted in 2009, the GAFCON Primates Council recognized the Anglican Church in North America as a Province of the Anglican Communion and invited Archbishop Robert Duncan to join the Primates Council. The leadership of the Anglican Global South has dealt with the reality of the Anglican Church in North America similarly, and the Anglican Church in North America is a member.

== Table of Archbishops ==
#	Archbishop	Image	Took office	Left office	Diocese	Length of term
1	Robert Duncan		June 21, 2009	June 21, 2014	Diocese of Pittsburgh	5 years, 0 days
2	Foley Beach		June 21, 2014	June 28, 2024	Diocese of the South	10 years, 7 days
3	Steve Wood		June 28, 2024	currently serving	Diocese of the Carolinas	
