= Derek Jones (bishop) =

American Anglican bishop

The Right Reverend Derek Jones
- Bishop of the Anglican Reformed Catholic Church
- Church: Anglican Reformed Catholic Church
- Diocese: Jurisdiction of the Armed Forces and Chaplaincy (organization)
- In office: 2014–present
- Other posts: Bishop of the ACNA Special Jurisdiction of the Armed Forces and Chaplaincy, 2014–2025

Orders
- Ordination: 2001
- Consecration: January 2007
- Laicized: September 2026 (by ACNA)

Personal details
- Born: 1961 (age 64–65)
- Denomination: Anglicanism
- Education: Samford University (B.S., M.Div.)

Derek Linton Sean Jones (born 1961) is an American Anglican bishop and retired U.S. Air Force pilot. During his ordained ministry, he has been canonically resident in the Communion of Evangelical Episcopal Churches (CEEC), the Church of Nigeria and the Anglican Church in North America (ACNA), where he was bishop of the Special Jurisdiction of the Armed Forces and Chaplaincy until he was inhibited from ministry, found guilty of violations of the church's canons and removed from holy orders. In 2025, while under investigation in the ACNA, he founded the breakaway Anglican Reformed Catholic Church, in which he continued to present himself as a bishop.

== Education and military career ==
Jones received a B.S. in mathematics at Samford University and an M.Div. from Samford's Beeson Divinity School.

Jones was a United States Air Force officer for 28 years. He flew the F-16, F-111, CF-18 and T-37. During his service, he received the Air Medal and the Meritorious Service Medal, among others. His final year as an active-duty pilot was 1998, after which he served as an instructor pilot in the U.S. Air Force Reserve. His final role before retiring in 2009 was as reserve advisor to the commander of the Air Force Doctrine Center.

== Ordained ministry ==
Jones was ordained a priest in 2001 and consecrated a bishop in 2007 in the Communion of Evangelical Episcopal Churches. He served as a military chaplain endorsing agent, and in 2008, he joined the Convocation of Anglicans in North America, the Church of Nigeria's Anglican realignment body in the United States. Jones was hired as an assisting bishop to manage the administrative functions of CANA's chaplaincy deanery, which had been founded earlier in 2008 under CANA Suffragan Bishop David Bena.

The chaplaincy deanery later became the Special Jurisdiction of the Armed Forces and Chaplaincy after the formation of the ACNA, which approved the SJAFC's constitution and canons in 2014. Jones was affirmed that year as the first bishop of the SJAFC. Meanwhile, Jones formed a nonprofit organization based in Montevallo, Alabama, that shared the name Jurisdiction of the Armed Forces and Chaplaincy (JAFC); it received 501(c)3 tax-exempt status in 2017. In addition to leading the SJAFC, Jones was executive director of the Chaplains' Alliance for Religious Liberty, a board member of the National Committee for Religious Freedom and Nashotah House, chair of the National Conference on Ministry to the Armed Forces and president of the Birmingham, Alabama, chapter of the Air Force Association.

By 2024, the SJAFC had become the principal endorser of Anglican military chaplains in the United States with more than 300 chaplains, 187 of them serving as active-duty military chaplains. At this time, the ACNA endorsed roughly 10% of the 3,000 active-duty U.S. military chaplains. According to Baptist News Global, this gave "the small denomination a 'prestige multiplier,' granting its bishops access and influence in federal spaces that far outstrips their actual footprint in American religious life." As bishop, Jones said he prayed for each ACNA chaplain by name daily.

After reviewing what he called credible allegations of abuse of power by Jones, the ACNA's archbishop, Steve Wood, on September 21, 2025, inhibited Jones from ordained ministry. However, Jones claimed to Religion News Service that he had withdrawn from the ACNA on September 20 and, on September 22, that the JAFC's executive committee had issued a letter announcing that it had withdrawn the jurisdiction from the ACNA. In a recording of a video call with chaplains that the JAFC posted on YouTube, Jones denied that the allegations against him were legitimate (dismissing some as an expression of a "woke USA"), rejected Wood's ability to inhibit him and argued that the ACNA had delayed a purported revision to the canon establishing the SJAFC that would explicitly recognize a right to disaffiliate. The executive committee of the nonprofit organization he led, the similarly named Jurisdiction for the Armed Forces and Chaplaincy, said it had left the ACNA and that chaplains it endorsed would remain affiliated to Jones' organization. In December 2025, Jones founded a breakaway denomination called the Anglican Reformed Catholic Church (ARCC).

The ACNA said its canons did not allow Jones to resign while under a disciplinary proceeding for the SJAFC to disaffiliate unilaterally, and the ACNA brought him to trial on canonical charges before its Court for the Trial of a Bishop. Jones refused to participate in the trial process, and in August 2026, the court tried him in absentia and found him guilty of violating the ACNA's canons by refusing to submit to its disciplinary process, abusing ecclesiastical power through mistreatment of chaplains in the Special Jurisdiction, and promoting and causing schism by founding the ARCC without being released from the ACNA. The court found that the Jones used a policy of requiring chaplains to donate up to 10% of their salaries to the JAFC's 501(c)(3) nonprofit organization as leverage against chaplains who sought to transfer to different jurisdictions and that Jones backdated a document in which he attempted to impose ecclesiastical discipline on a chaplain who was not under his authority. Jones had earlier called the investigation a "witch hunt", and after the verdict a spokesman told media that Jones was "never part of the ACNA" and thus the province "never had authority" over him. In September 2026, the ACNA college of bishops sentenced Jones to deposition from holy orders.

== Personal life ==
Jones is married to the former Connie Lee and lives in Alabama.

Religious titles
New title	Bishop of the Special Jurisdiction of the Armed Forces and Chaplaincy; 2014–2025	Succeeded by Jay Cayangyang
