= Marshall MacClellan =

American Anglican bishop and theologian

The Right Reverend Marshall MacClellan
- Bishop Suffragan of the Jurisdiction of the Armed Forces and Chaplaincy
- Church: Anglican Church in North America; Anglican Reformed Catholic Church
- Diocese: Armed Forces and Chaplaincy
- In office: 2025–2026

Orders
- Ordination: February 2011 (diaconate); July 2011 (priesthood)
- Consecration: June 21, 2025 by Steve Wood

Personal details
- Spouse: Christy MacClellan
- Children: 5
- Education: Florida Southern College; Duke Divinity School (M.Div.); Asbury Theological Seminary (D.Min.)

Marshall Edward MacClellan is an American Anglican bishop and retired military chaplain. He served for 24 years as a U.S. Air Force chaplain. From 2025 until his inhibition from ministry in 2026 on canonical charges, he was a suffragan bishop in the Anglican Church in North America's Special Jurisdiction of the Armed Forces and Chaplaincy (SJAFC).

== Biography ==
MacClellan has a bachelor's degree from Florida Southern College, a master of divinity from Duke Divinity School and a doctor of ministry from Asbury Theological Seminary, where his 1999 dissertation was on "Biblical narrative preaching as a means of cultivating holiness of heart and life." Prior to his military service, he was a United Methodist minister in Florida.

MacClellan was a U.S. Air Force chaplain from 1998 to 2022. During his service, he deployed four times within the Central Command area of responsibility and served as instructor at the Air Force Chaplain Corps College, where he led the education division. He concluded his Air Force service at the Pentagon as deputy joint staff chaplain to the Chairman of the Joint Chiefs of Staff. He has also been a law enforcement chaplain, serving police and sheriff's departments in Auburndale, Florida; Val Verde County, Texas; and Green Cove Springs, Florida.

During his Air Force service, MacClellan was ordained as an Anglican deacon and then priest in 2011. Within the ACNA's chaplaincy jurisdiction, he was canon theologian prior to his election in 2025 as a suffragan bishop. He was consecrated and installed alongside Jay Cayangyang at during the JAFC convocation at Church of the Cross in Bluffton, South Carolina on June 21, 2025.

MacClellan was inhibited from ministry in the ACNA in January 2026. He was indicted on canonical charges in the ACNA in May 2026, although by that point he had joined the breakaway Anglican Reformed Catholic Church founded by former ACNA chaplaincy bishop Derek Jones.

== Personal life ==
MacClellan is married to Christy; they have five children.
