= Anglican Diocese of the Upper Midwest =

Anglican diocese in the United States

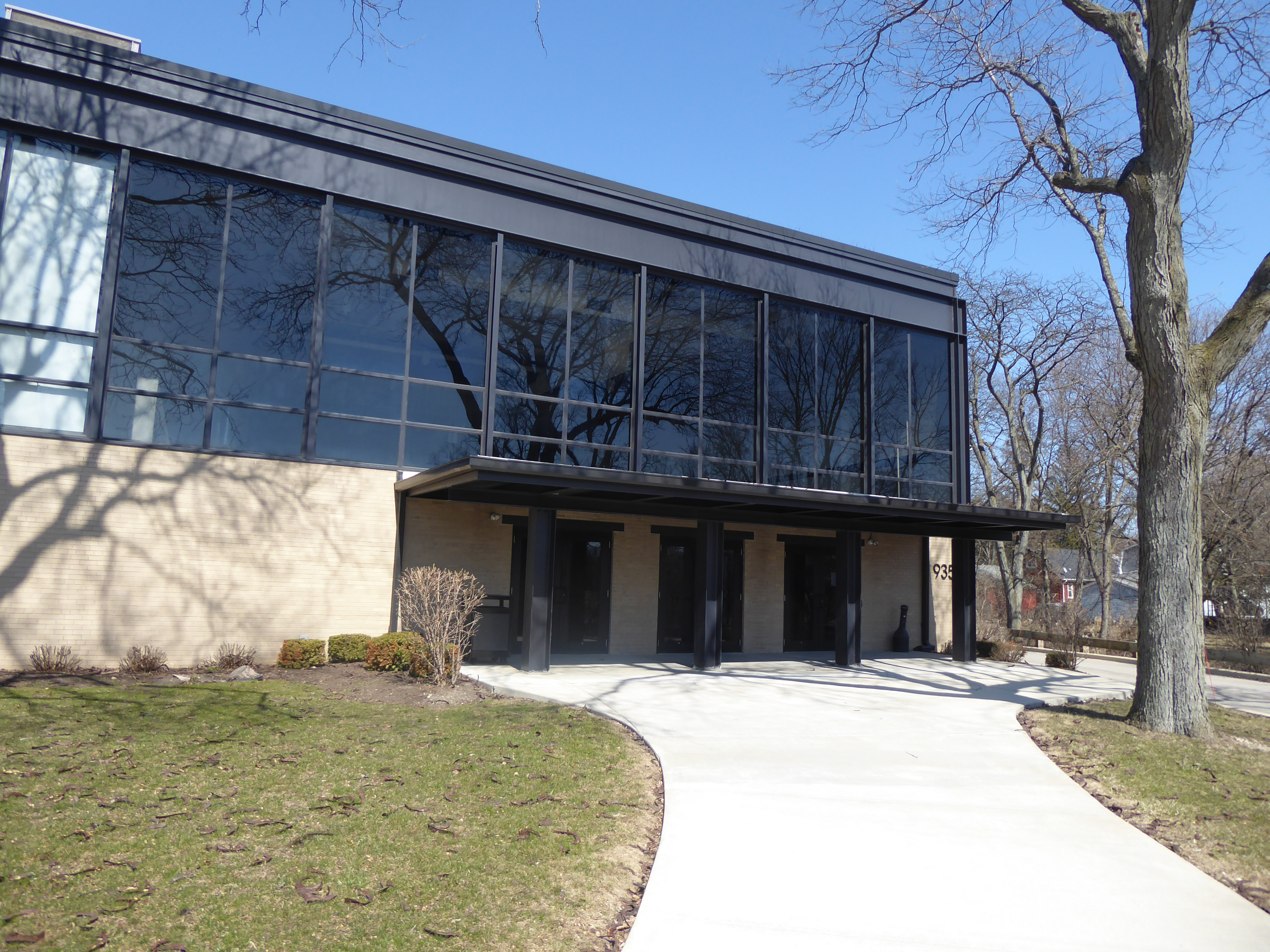
- Church of the Resurrection, cathedral of the Anglican Diocese of the Upper Midwest, Wheaton, Illinois

Location
- Ecclesiastical province: Anglican Church in North America

Statistics
- Parishes: 18 (2025)
- Members: 2,908 (2025)

Information
- Rite: Anglican
- Cathedral: Church of the Resurrection (Wheaton, Illinois)

Current leadership
- Bishop: Stewart Ruch

Website
- midwestanglican.org

The Anglican Diocese of the Upper Midwest is a diocese of the Anglican Church in North America with congregations mostly in Illinois and Wisconsin.

== History ==
The decision to create a diocese in the Midwest of the United States was taken on 27 April 2013, at a gathering of 117 Anglican priests and laity, at the Church of the Resurrection, in Wheaton, Illinois. The movement to initiate a new diocese was started by several parishes in the states of Wisconsin, northern Illinois and Iowa, under the leadership of Robert Munday, former Dean of Nashotah House, a few months before. It had the support of the Southeastern Wisconsin Chapter of the American Anglican Council, whose President was Bill Chapin. The diocese was initially divided into four deaneries: Wisconsin, Minnesota, Greater Chicago, and Greenhouse. In 2025, the diocesan deaneries are located in Wisconsin-Iowa-Minnesota and Chicago-Kansas City. Its first elected bishop was Stewart E. Ruch III, Rector of the Church of the Resurrection, in Wheaton. The diocese was approved at the Provincial Council of ACNA at 18 June 2013. Bishop Stewart Ruch was consecrated the first bishop on 28 September 2013.

== Organizations and ministries ==
The Greenhouse Movement and Gregory House are religious organizations operating under the authority of the Diocese.

=== The Greenhouse Movement ===
Fr. William Beasley was ordained in 1984 and has overseen the expansion and multiplication of several churches in the Chicagoland area, including Church of the Resurrection, the cathedral for the Anglican Diocese of the Upper Midwest. According to the Greenhouse Movement website, “...he began to travel extensively to Africa where he encountered the fruit of the Eastern African Revival – a movement of the spontaneous expansion of the church by the empowering of lay leaders under godly authority. This encounter gave William the faith for a similar “wineskin” here in North America, which led to the birth of the Greenhouse Movement – the fruit of which, in time, enables the spontaneous multiplication of many congregations that remain connected to one main church.”

Church Planting

From 2016 to August 2025, the organization listed forty-two distinct church plants throughout the United States and Mexico, of which five are still in operation and affiliated with the Greenhouse Movement. They claim that “The Greenhouse Movement currently has around 50 employees located across 12 states.”

Ministries

In addition to planting churches, the Greenhouse Movement accepts donations on behalf of five ministries, though only two appear to be active within the last several years. St. Paul’s House of Formation, an online course in Anglican theology and tradition, and Word and Table, an accompanying podcast, are currently offering services. As of July 2025, Caminemos Juntos, a conference for Latino Anglican churches, Equipped to Heal, a healing prayer ministry; and Walk Across the Street, a movement for racial reconciliation, appear to be inactive. Greenhouse also lists two other ministries, Missio Corps and Reciprocal Mission, that do not accept donations.

William Beasley's Retirement

On Oct. 4, 2021, William Beasley retired as 'Missioner General' of the Greenhouse Movement. That same day, Archbishop Foley Beach requested he take a leave of absence from priestly ministry. Beach stated that, "His leave of absence is neither a suspension nor an inhibition but an opportunity to provide distance during the expanded investigation stemming from allegations of abuse in the Diocese of the Upper Midwest."

Current Greenhouse Leadership As of 2025, the Greenhouse Movement is still under the authority of the Bishop of the Diocese of the Upper Midwest (Stewart Ruch.) The organization is currently led by the Revs. Jens Notstad and Keith Hartsell.

== Sexual Abuse and Mishandling Allegations ==
Joel Girard: In October 2019, a former Greenhouse employee claimed to Bishop Stewart Ruch that a current employee, Joel Girard, had sexually assaulted her. According to the Greenhouse Movement, Girard worked with their Latino church plants and in college campus ministry at College of Dupage and the University of Illinois - Chicago. He had previously worked for religious non-profits in Kampala, Uganda and Miami, FL. The Greenhouse Movement has made no public statement regarding the allegations against Joel Girard. The Diocese delayed notifying congregations until 2021 at the alleged survivor's insistence when it published a letter regarding "credible allegations of serious sexual misconduct and abuse." A police report was filed relating to the allegations in 2021. Girard is no longer employed by the Greenhouse movement and has not been criminally charged.

Mark Rivera: In 2019, a lay leader at the church of Christ Our Light in Big Rock, Illinois, Mark Rivera, was charged with two felony counts of criminal sexual assault of a minor and predatory abuse. 10 survivors came forward to report Rivera to the diocese, which only acknowledged some of the allegations. In 2021, Bishop Ruch took a leave of absence after admitting he had made a "regrettable error" after it was found that he mishandled the allegations of sexual abuse, and failed to inform the members of his diocese about the allegations.

Ruch's mishandling of the allegations provoked not one but two parallel investigations — one into the accusations against Rivera and the diocese's response and another into allegations that Ruch and other Anglican Church in North America leaders had created a culture of coercion and control in the Diocese of the Upper Midwest.

In June 2023, 45 priests and lay persons from the diocese and other churches filed a presentment, ora set of allegations, against Ruch. The presentment alleged that Ruch welcomed men with criminal histories into the diocese. These include 1) ordaining Joshua Moon, a former Presbyterian pastor arrested for soliciting a prostitute, and installing him as rector of Resurrection Anglican in Robbinsdale, Minnesota, 2) hiring Nephtali Matta as a pastoral resident despite his conviction for felony domestic abuse in Colorado, 3) appointing Church of the Resurrection member Chris Lapeyre to supervise a congregant convicted of child sexual abuse, despite Lapeyre being fired from his position as a school teacher for inappropriate conduct with minors, and 4) maintaining the employment of Joel Girard, an employee of the diocese' Greenhouse Movement after Girard allegedly confessed to the sexual assault of another staff member.

In 2023, the Anglican Church in North America announced that two sets of allegations of abuse mishandling against Ruch would advance to an ecclesiastical trial, which began in July 2025.

The prolonged controversy in the diocese has led to several parishes leaving the organization or closing their doors. Two Minnesota parishes independently voted to transfer out of the diocese in 2023. In 2024 one closed in Kenosha, Wisconsin. In 2025, the diocese reported 18 congregations (down 15% from 2022) with an overall membership of 2,908 (up 6% from 2022) and average Sunday attendance of 2,514 (roughly the same as in 2022).
