= National Conference on Ministry to the Armed Forces =

U.S. group of religious organizations

- Abbreviation: NCMAF
- Formation: 1982
- Executive director: Doyle W. Dunn
- Website: ncmaf.com

The National Conference on Ministry to the Armed Forces (NCMAF) is an umbrella group of religious organizations in the United States which endorse clergy for service as military chaplains in the United States armed forces. It functions as the point of contact between religious groups and the government of the United States military to satisfy the U.S. military requirement that chaplains serving with the various branches of the U.S. armed forces hold "ecclesiastical endorsement" from their religious communities and also serves as a forum for discussions among member organizations regarding issues relating to the military chaplaincy.

== History ==
Although not officially formed as a "private organization" until 1982, the group's website states that its "roots go back to 1901 when the decision was made by the War Department (predecessor to the Department of Defense) to require ecclesiastical endorsement for clergy who serve as chaplains in the armed forces".

== Purpose ==
Member organizations represent over 150 "religious denominations and faith groups" that act as the "point of contact" between the armed forces and America's religious community when it comes to dealing with American religious representatives who would like to serve as military chaplains. Member organizations represent groups including Protestant, Roman Catholic, Eastern Orthodox, Buddhist, Islamic, and Hindu.

The group states that all member organizations want to endorse clergy who are "credible, committed to their faith, open to all persons, able to meet all military standards, and who represent the highest standards of their own faith communities".

In addition to supporting the member organizations that endorse chaplains of their own faith, the group functions as a forum for discussion of information of interest to all member organizations, such as the recommendation by some community groups to add atheist or humanist chaplains to serve military personnel.

== Ecclesiastical endorsements ==
Department of Defense Instruction 2304.28, outlines "Guidance for the appointment of chaplains for the military departments" and includes the requirement (among others) that "religious ministry professionals" (RMPs) must "receive an endorsement from a qualified religious organization". It defines endorsement as "the internal process that religious organizations use when designating RMPS to represent their religious organizations to the Military Departments and confirm the ability of their RMPs to conduct religious observances or ceremonies in a military context." It defines "Ecclesiastical Endorsing Agent" as "an individual authorized to provide or withdraw Ecclesiastical Endorsements on behalf of a religious organization".

== Veterans Affairs chaplains ==
The group also functions as the "Endorsers Conference for Veterans Affairs Chaplaincy" (ECVAC), endorsing chaplains for Department of Veterans Affairs hospitals, acting as the liaison organization between American religious communities and the Department of Veterans Affairs.
