= Trinity Episcopal Church (Wheaton, Illinois) =

Historic church

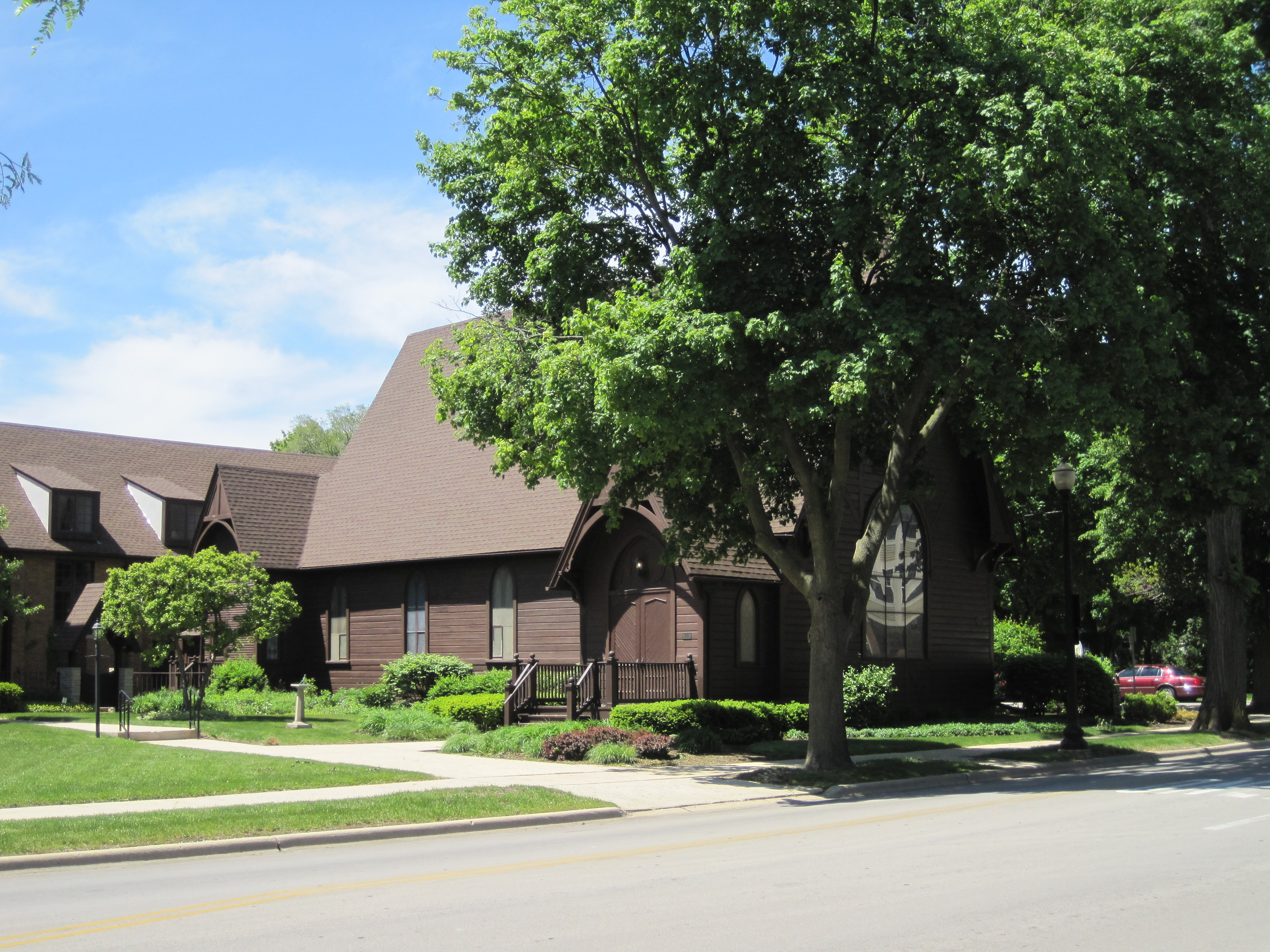
- Trinity Episcopal Church in 2011

Religion
- Affiliation: Episcopal Church
- Leadership: Kevin Caruso

Location
- Location: 130 N. West St. Wheaton, DuPage County, Illinois, U.S.
- Interactive map of Trinity Episcopal Church
- Coordinates: 41.865833°N 88.111944°W

Architecture
- Architects: Treat & Folts
- Style: Gothic Revival
- Completed: 1881

U.S. National Register of Historic Places
- Added to NRHP: January 9, 1978
- NRHP Reference no.: 78003108

Trinity Episcopal Church is a historical Gothic Revival Episcopal church in Wheaton, Illinois.

== History ==
Three families from Wheaton area farms organized the establishment of an Episcopal church in 1875. Bishop William E. McLaren held the first services in the local Universalist church, located where the DuPage County Historical Museum now stands. After six years of sharing the church, the congregation decided to erect its own. It was constructed in 1881 and has been in continuous use since June 30, 1882. Common to churches built at the time, the church was in the "Prairie Gothic" style. The church was added to the National Register of Historic Places in 1978.

== Architecture ==
A parish hall was built in 1893, which was later incorporated into a 1956 church building. In 1894, a shallow basement was added under the wood-frame church for the furnace. A Kimball pipe organ was installed in 1894 and new light fixtures added in 1926. In the late 1950s a new, larger church was added, forming a U-shaped courtyard with the original church. A renovation and expansion project modernized some aspects of the church in 1997.

The exterior of the original church (now the chapel) is covered with beveled siding. The hammerbeam roof was originally covered with wood shingles but these have been replaced with asphalt shingles. The interior features matched and beaded fir boards laid in alternating panels. Most of the original stained glass windows remain, although the Great Window on the east (main) wall was rebuilt in a 1975 rehabilitation. Pews are 13.75 inches (349 mm) wide and are built from individual pine boards. Other articles of furniture, including the altar and pew ends, are oak.
