= Stewart Ruch =

American Anglican bishop

The Right Reverend Stewart Ruch
- Bishop of the Upper Midwest
- Church: Anglican Church in North America
- Diocese: Upper Midwest
- In office: Since 2013
- Previous post: Rector of Church of the Resurrection (1999–2019)

Orders
- Consecration: September 28, 2013 by Robert Duncan

Personal details
- Born: 1966 or 1967 (age 58–59)
- Spouse: Katherine Ruch
- Education: Wheaton College

Stewart E. Ruch III (born 1966 or 1967) is an American Anglican bishop. He has been the first bishop of the Anglican Diocese of the Upper Midwest at the Anglican Church in North America, since his consecration on September 28, 2013, by Archbishop Robert Duncan.

== Biography ==
Stewart Ruch was raised as a high church Presbyterian and in the Charismatic movement, but he felt more attracted to Anglicanism when he joined Wheaton College and first read the Book of Common Prayer. He later had a spiritual crisis and only returned fully to the Christian faith in September 1991, thanks to the ministry of Fr. William Beasley, at the Church of the Resurrection in West Chicago, IL.

He majored in English at Wheaton College, and was also actively involved in theater. He later earned a Master of Theology at Wheaton and won Wheaton's Kenneth Kantzer Prize for Theology. He is pursuing his doctorate of ministry from Nashotah House Theological Seminary, Nashotah, WI.

He has been the rector of the Church of the Resurrection, which relocated to Wheaton, Illinois, since 1999. He left the Episcopal Church, because of disagreements with the leadership of the denomination and what he perceived as liberalism, particularly on the subject of homosexuality and sexual ethics, and particularly in the sermons and writings of the Bishop of Chicago Frank T. Griswold. Ruch then, in 1997, became pastor at the Church of the Resurrection following Canon William Beasley. In 2013, he and his congregation joined the new Anglican Church in North America, launched in June 2009. He is married to Katherine and they have six children.

He and Baroness Caroline Cox escaped narrowly an ambush by Islamist Fulani herdsmen during a visit to Jos Plateau State, in Nigeria, on November 14, 2016.

== Ministry ==
Ruch states that he "has a vision to see a Revival of Word and Sacrament infused by the Holy Spirit in the Upper Midwest." He was consecrated the first bishop of the Diocese of the Upper Midwest on September 28, 2013. Since his ordination, over thirty new churches have been planted within the Diocese of the Upper Midwest. As bishop, Ruch has overseen numerous Diocesan ministries including The Greenhouse Movement and Gregory House.

Stewart Ruch has preached throughout the Anglican diaspora and at Wheaton College. He has contributed to several articles for Christianity Today. Along with his wife Katherine Ruch, he has created and led the Fully Alive Conference, a weekend conference of sermons, lectures, and worship centered around complementarian theology, celibacy, and sexuality.

In 2023, at GAFCON, Archbishop Ben Kwashi announced that Bishop Ruch had been appointed to 'Next Gen,' "the intentional development of the next leaders of the movement."

== Allegations of abuse mishandling ==
In July 2021, Ruch went on leave after making what he called “regrettable errors” in handling cases of sexual abuse in the diocese. The leave of absence followed disclosures that Mark Rivera, lay catechist at Christ Our Light Anglican Church in Big Rock, Illinois, had been arrested in 2019 and charged with felony sexual assault and predatory abuse of a victim under 13 years of age. Since 2019, over a dozen survivors have come forward with accounts of abuse by Rivera. Their allegations included rape, assault, child sexual abuse, indecent exposure, and grooming. Rivera was sentenced to 15 years in jail on March 6, 2023, and another 6 years was added to his sentence on April 12, 2023.

In June 2021, a former congregant of Christ Our Light, Joanna Rudenborg, alleged on Twitter that she had been raped twice by ACNA catechist Mark Rivera and that Ruch, along with other Diocesan leaders, had mishandled the allegations years prior. In response to her allegations, ACNAtoo was formed as an anti-abuse advocacy group. Later that month, Bishop Ruch first informed the Diocese of Upper Midwest congregations about the allegations against Rivera, nearly two years since learning of the first assault claims. Rivera had previously held multiple volunteer roles at Church of the Resurrection, where Ruch served as rector and then as bishop.

=== Investigations ===
Following the events of June 2021, the ACNA launched two parallel investigations — one into the accusations against Rivera and the diocese's response and another into allegations that Ruch and other ACNA leaders had created a culture of coercion and control in the Diocese of the Upper Midwest.

=== Ecclesiastical trial ===
After the investigations were concluded in 2022, two sets of charges, known as presentments, were filed against Ruch. On January 31, 2023, Ruch challenged the validity of the first presentment, halting the process until Archbishop Foley Beach publicly addressed Ruch's appeal. On August 15, 2023, and November 6, 2023, the Anglican Church in North America announced that the two presentments against Bishop Ruch would advance to an ecclesiastical trial. The Ruch trial began in July 2025 on four charges:

1. Habitual Neglect of the Duties of the Bishop’s Office in Violation of Canon IV.2.10;
2. Conduct Giving Just Cause for Scandal or Offense including Abuse of Ecclesiastical Power in Violation of Canon IV.2.4;
3. Conduct that Violates a Bishop’s Ordination Vows, Canon IV. 2.3;
4. Disobedience, or Willful Contravention of the Canons of this Church or of the Constitution or Canons of the Diocese in Which He Holds Office, Canon IV.2.9.

Ruch was found not guilty of all charges by the court in December 2025.

=== Lawsuit ===
The mother of the child assaulted by Rivera filed a lawsuit on May 18, 2022, in Kane County, Illinois, against Christ Our Light Anglican Church arguing that the child experienced mental anguish and emotional and physical pain because of the church's negligence, and requests over $50,000 in damages. The lawsuit also names several other ACNA entities as respondents in discovery, including the Diocese of the Upper Midwest, Church of the Resurrection (the diocesan cathedral where Rivera previously attended and volunteered), the Greenhouse Movement (the church planting organization that oversaw Christ Our Light Anglican) and the Anglican Church in North America. The case is co-counseled by longtime sexual abuse attorney Boz Tchividjian and Chicago attorney Evan Smola.

Anglican Communion titles
Preceded by See created	I Bishop of the Upper Midwest; 2013–present	Incumbent
