= Jay Cayangyang =

American Anglican bishop

The Right Reverend Jay Cayangyang
- Bishop of the Armed Forces and Chaplaincy
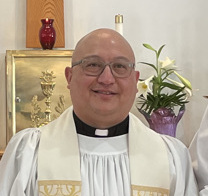
- Cayangyang at Bishop Seabury Church in 2021
- Church: Anglican Church in North America
- Diocese: Special Jurisdiction of the Armed Forces and Chaplaincy
- In office: 2025–present
- Predecessor: Derek Jones

Orders
- Ordination: 1996
- Consecration: June 21, 2025 by Steve Wood

Personal details
- Spouse: Linda Cayangyang
- Children: 5
- Military career
- Branch: United States Navy; United States Navy Reserve
- Rank: Captain
- Unit: United States Navy Chaplain Corps

Jerome Rosas "Jay" Cayangyang is an American Anglican bishop and U.S. Navy chaplain. Since September 2025, he has been a bishop of the Anglican Church in North America's Special Jurisdiction of the Armed Forces and Chaplaincy (SJAFC).

== Biography ==
Cayangyang grew up in Jacksonville, Florida, where his father was stationed at Naval Station Mayport while serving on the USS Voge. He was ordained as both deacon and priest in 1996 and has served in churches in California, Virginia and Florida.

As a U.S. Navy Reserve chaplain, Cayangyang had numerous assignments including deployment with Marines during the Iraq War. In 2011, Cayangyang returned to Jacksonville as command chaplain at Naval Station Mayport. He also served as canon to the ordinary in the JAFC and as deputy chaplain of the Marine Corps for reserve matters.

In 2015, Cayangyang was appointed rector of Bishop Seabury Anglican Church in Gales Ferry, Connecticut. He was also archdeacon for the Northeast in the Anglican Diocese of the Living Word. In 2025, Cayangyang's election as a suffragan bishop in the SJAFC was confirmed. He was consecrated and installed alongside Marshall MacClellan at during the SJAFC convocation at Church of the Cross in Bluffton, South Carolina on June 21, 2025.

In September 2025, Cayangyang was elected by the ACNA College of Bishops to replace Derek Jones, who had withdrawn from the province, as bishop of the SJAFC.

== Personal life ==
Cayangyang is married to Linda; they have five adult children.

Religious titles
Preceded by Derek Jones	Bishop of the Special Jurisdiction of the Armed Forces and Chaplaincy; Since 2025	Incumbent
