= Religion News Service =

News agency

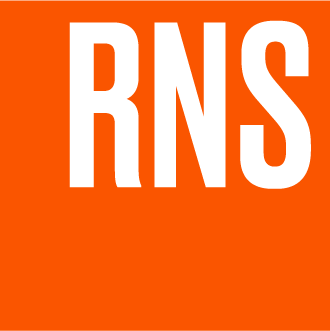
- Type: News agency
- Industry: Media
- Founded: 1934
- Founders: Louis Minsky
- Parent: Religion News Foundation
- Website: rns.org

Religion News Service, branded as RNS, is a news agency founded in 1934. It covers religion, ethics, spirituality, and morality. It publishes news, information, and commentaries on faiths and religious movements in newspapers, magazines, broadcast organizations, and religious publications.

== History ==
RNS was founded in 1934 by journalist Louis Minsky as an affiliate of the National Conference of Christians and Jews. Everett R. Clinchy was the managing editor and co-founder; he died in January 1986 in Guilford, Connecticut. RNS was acquired by the United Methodist Reporter in 1983, by Newhouse News Service in 1994, and by the Religion Newswriters Foundation in 2011.

== Former logos ==
Former logos of RNS
RNS logo 2021

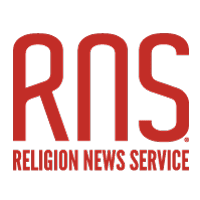
Former RNS logo

== See also ==
- Institute for Nonprofit News (member)
- News media in the United States
- Religion in the United States
