= Inhibition (law) =

Legal term

Inhibition (from Latin inhibere, to restrain, prevent), as an English legal term, particularly used in ecclesiastical law, is an act of restraint or prohibition, for a writ from a superior to an inferior court, suspending proceedings in a case under appeal, also for the suspension of a jurisdiction of a bishop's court on the visitation of an archbishop, and for that of an archdeacon on the visitation of a bishop. It is more particularly applied to a form of ecclesiastical censure, suspending an offending clergyman from the performance of any religious service, or other spiritual duty, for the purpose of enforcing obedience to a monition or order of the bishop or judge. Such inhibitions are at the discretion of the ordinary if he considers that scandal might arise from the performance of spiritual duties by the offender [as per Church Discipline Act 1840 (3 & 4 Vict. c. 86), re-enacted by section 10 of the Clergy Discipline Act 1892 (55 & 56 Vict. c. 32)].

By section 5 of the Sequestration Act 1871 (34 & 35 Vict. c. 45), similar powers of inhibition are given where a sequestration remains in force for more than six months, and also, by the Benefices Act 1898 (61 & 62 Vict. c. 48), in cases where a commission reports that the ecclesiastical duties of a benefice are inadequately performed through the negligence of the incumbent.

In modern times, "inhibit(ion)" is a Philippine English variant of recusal or recuse in other English varieties.
