= List of dioceses of the Anglican Church in North America =

The Anglican Church in North America is a North American member province of the Global Fellowship of Confessing Anglicans (GAFCON). It is currently divided in 28 dioceses and one special jurisdiction. There are numerous geographically based dioceses and non-geographical dioceses and jurisdictions. Many jurisdictions overlap with each other.

Each diocese has a bishop and sometimes suffragan or assistant bishops.

== Dioceses ==
Diocese	Territory	Cathedral	See city	Bishop(s)	Founded	Number of congregations (2025)	Membership (2025)	Average Sunday attendance (2025)
All Nations	Non-geographical	Christ Church	El Paso, Texas	Diocesan: Felix Orji; Suffragan: Scott Seely	2011	27	1758	1111
All Saints	Non-geographical	Church of the Ascension	Charles Town, West Virginia	Darryl Fitzwater	2011	26	1223	787
Armed Forces and Chaplaincy†	Non-geographical	None		Jay Cayangyang	2007	N/A	N/A	N/A
Canada	Canada	None	Burlington, Ontario, Canada	Diocesan: Dan Gifford; Suffragan: Stephen Leung, Mike Stewart	2007	68	5122	4729
Carolinas	North Carolina, South Carolina, Kentucky	Cathedral Church of the Apostles, Columbia, South Carolina	Mount Pleasant, South Carolina	Diocesan: Steve Wood; Suffragan: David Bryan, Terrell Glenn; Assisting: Thad Barnum	2012	36	9068	6945
Cascadia	Alaska, California, Idaho, Montana, Oregon, Washington	St. Charles Anglican Cathedral	Bremerton, Washington	Jacob Worley	2011	27	1350	1322
Central States (Reformed Episcopal)	Alabama, Florida, Indiana, Kentucky, North Carolina, Ohio, Tennessee, Virginia, West Virginia	None	None	Jason Grote	2008	22	1571	1140
Christ Our Hope	Eastern United States	Church of the Redeemer, Greensboro, North Carolina‡ St. John's Anglican Church, Southampton, Pennsylvania‡	Greensboro, North Carolina	Ordinary: Alan J. Hawkins; Suffragan: Quigg Lawrence; Assisting: Steve Breedlove, Paul Donison	2012, reconstituted 2016	55 (Note: Includes the Great Plains Missionary District.)	8966	7915
Churches for the Sake of Others	Non-geographical	None	Washington, D.C.	Jeff Bailey	2013	56	12014	12660
Fort Worth	North-Central Texas	St. Vincent's Cathedral	Fort Worth	Diocesan: Ryan Reed Assisting: Keith Ackerman	1983	54	9306	4983
Great Lakes	Indiana, Kentucky, Michigan, New York, Ohio	Holy Spirit Anglican Church, Akron‡	Akron, Ohio	Diocesan: Mark Engel Suffragan: Allen Kannapell	2010	40	3280	2369
Gulf Atlantic	Alabama, Florida, Georgia	St. Peter's Anglican Cathedral, Tallahassee	Jacksonville	Diocesan: Alex Farmer; Assisting: Neil Lebhar, John E. Miller III	2009	34	6308	4069
Living Word	Non-geographical	Bishop Seabury Anglican Church, Gales Ferry, Connecticut‡	McLean, Virginia	Diocesan: Julian Dobbs; Suffragan: Marc Steele	2013	46	2610	2122
Mid-America (Reformed Episcopal)	Arkansas, Colorado, Illinois, Kansas, Louisiana, Michigan, Missouri, Mississippi, Montana, Nebraska, Oklahoma, Texas, Wisconsin, Wyoming, British Columbia, Cuba	Cathedral Church of the Holy Communion	Dallas	Diocesan: Ray R. Sutton; Suffragan: Walter Banek, Charlie Camlin	1996	42	2814	2041
Mid-Atlantic	District of Columbia, Maryland, North Carolina, Virginia, West Virginia	None	Woodbridge, Virginia	Christopher Warner	2011	41	8951	6886
New England	Connecticut, Maine, Massachusetts, New Hampshire, New York, Rhode Island, Vermont	All Saints Cathedral	Amesbury, Massachusetts	Diocesan: Andrew Williams; Assisting: William H. Love, Trevor Walters	2010	30	2204	1683
Northeast and Mid-Atlantic (Reformed Episcopal)	Maryland, Massachusetts, New Jersey, New York, Pennsylvania, Ontario	None	Philadelphia	William A. Jenkins Sr.	1984	24	913	689
Pittsburgh	Western Pennsylvania	None	Pittsburgh	Alex Cameron	1865	45	5728	4072
Quincy	Northwestern Illinois	St. John's Cathedral	Quincy, Illinois	Juan Alberto Morales	1877	34	3886	2110
Rocky Mountains	Western United States	None	Colorado Springs, Colorado	Diocesan: Kenneth Ross; Suffragan: Benjamin Fischer, Billy Waters	2012, reconstituted 2016	41	5532	5613
San Joaquin	Central California, Nevada	Emmanuel Anglican Church	Fresno	Eric Menees	1911	30	2322	1483
South Carolina	South Carolina	Cathedral of St. Luke and St. Paul	Charleston, South Carolina	Chip Edgar	2012	53	16037	8133
South	Southeastern United States	Holy Cross Cathedral	Loganville, Georgia	Diocesan: Foley Beach; Assisting: Frank Lyons	2010	55 (Note: Includes the Anglican Diocese of the Mid-South.)	6961	6356
Southeast (Reformed Episcopal)	Georgia, South Carolina	None	Summerville, South Carolina	Willie J. Hill Jr.	1984	33	2330	1391
Southwest	Mexico, New Mexico, Texas	None	El Paso, Texas	Steven Tighe	2013	22	1949	1386
Upper Midwest	Illinois, Minnesota, Wisconsin, Iowa, South Dakota	Church of the Resurrection	Wheaton, Illinois	Stewart Ruch	2013	18	2908	2514
Western Anglicans	Arizona, California, Idaho, Montana, Nevada, Texas, Utah, Wyoming	All Saints Cathedral	Long Beach, California	Diocesan: Phil Ashey; Suffragan: Mark Zimmerman	2009	32	2833	2497
Western Gulf Coast	Texas, Louisiana	St. Timothy's Anglican Church	Spring, Texas	Clark Lowenfield	2013	14	2030	1508

† indicates a special jurisdiction or missionary district ‡ indicates a pro-cathedral

== Missionary District ==
In 2026, the ACNA announced the admission of the Anglican Diocese of the Mid-South as a missionary district within the Georgia-based Diocese of the South.

== See also ==
- Anglican Church in North America
- List of bishops of the Anglican Church in North America

== Sources ==
- AnglicanChurch.net
- ACNA.org
