= Middle judicatory =

Religious administrative structure

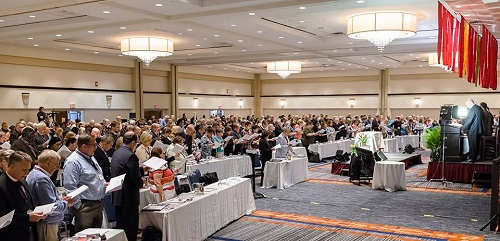
A meeting of the Metropolitan New York Synod of the Evangelical Lutheran Church in America.

A middle judicatory is an administrative structure or organization found in religious denominations between the local congregation and the widest or highest national or international level. While the term originated in Presbyterianism, the term has been widely adopted by other Christian communions, including Anglican, Lutheran, Methodist, Roman Catholic and even some congregationalist churches.

Middle judicatories have different names and structures across Christian denominations, and they may also be layered. For example, in the Latin Catholic church, dioceses and archdioceses are grouped into provinces, and in the Presbyterian Church (USA), presbyteries are grouped into synods. The typical funding model for middle judicatories is by apportionments or tithes paid from individual member congregations that have achieved a minimal level of financial stability.

== Terminology ==
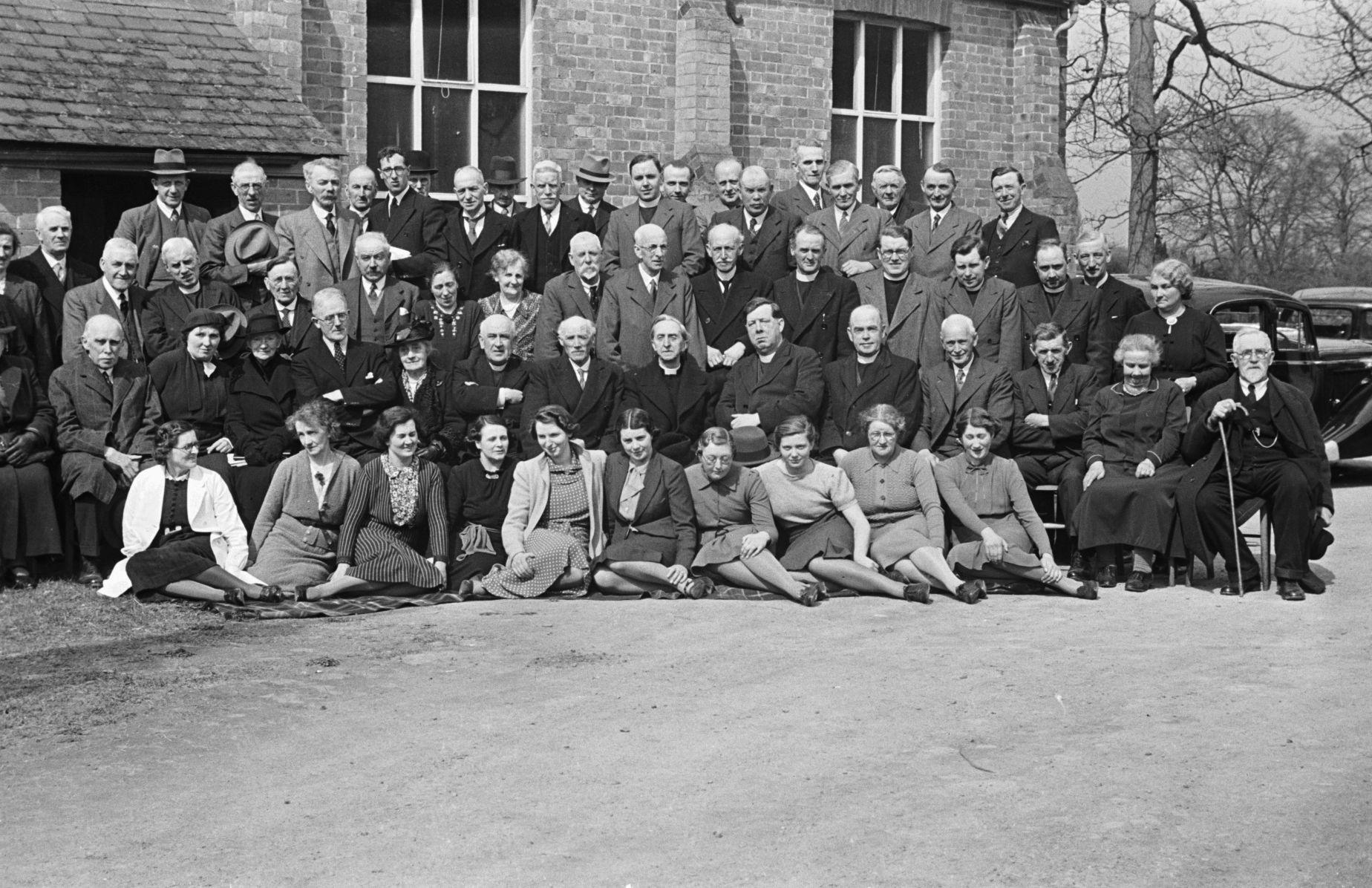
Attendees at a meeting of a Welsh presbytery in Berriew in 1940.

In English, the term "judicatory" originated in Presbyterian polity, which consists of layers of church courts—rising from local session to presbytery to general assembly—that adjudicate church disciplinary matters. However, the term is used within a variety of Christian traditions to describe their mid-tier organizations. Traditions with middle judicatories include Anglicanism, Lutheranism, Methodism, Roman Catholicism and some congregationalist communions, such as the United Church of Christ in the United States. Depending on the tradition, a judicatory may be called a classis, conference, diocese, district, eparchy, ordinariate, presbytery, synod or another term. Middle judicatories may also be layered, with dioceses being grouped into provinces (as in the Anglican and Roman Catholic traditions), districts being grouped into annual conferences (as in United Methodism) or presbyteries being grouped into synods (as in the Presbyterian Church (USA), where middle judicatories are known as "mid councils").

Although some Baptist denominations are organized into conventions and associations, in the Baptist tradition the local congregation is the primary church unit. As a result, not all Baptist conventions are considered middle judicatories.

== History ==
The diocese is an ancient organizational structure that dates back as far as the third century CE. The term originated in the Latin term dioecesis for subdivisions of provinces into administrative units. From its earliest use by Christian churches, a diocese referred to a unit that combined parishes and clergy under the authority of a bishop, who was in turn under the authority of a metropolitan. An eparchy, derived from the Greek term used for Roman provinces in the eastern empire, likewise referred to a metropolitan bishopric. The Protestant Reformation brought new forms of organization, with Anglicans retaining bishops; Lutherans and Methodists retaining bishops in some branches of their traditions; Reformed and Presbyterian churches adopting presbyterian polity; and congregationalist and Baptist churches "locat[ing] ultimate authority in the local church" while participating in regional and national conventions or associations.

While the term "middle judicatory" originated in Presbyterian polity, it came into more common use in the 20th century to describe a wider range of historic church associational forms, primarily but not exclusively among mainline Protestant churches. The role of judicatories expanded during that time period from handling discipline and ordination to encompass programmatic activities, theological education and church planting coordination, becoming what the Baptist pastor and church executive Ronald E. Vallet called "strategically important parts of the denominational system."

Some mainline denominations built new forms of middle judicatories during the 20th century. For example, the Christian Church (Disciples of Christ) moved from a congregationalist to a denominational model in 1968, creating "regions", the Disciples' term for their middle judicatory. In some cases, middle judicatories served as governing bodies for ecumenical and interfaith social services in local areas. The integration of middle judicatories from different traditions was a major topic of discussion and tension in negotiations over church union in the 20th century, a movement that saw several denominations merge and others discuss varying forms of unity short of full mergers. According to the United Methodist bishop William Henry Willimon, by the 21st century, some middle judicatories had begun shifting away from confrontational trial-based judicial practices to focus on coaching and conflict resolution techniques. According to Lutheran minister and church executive Robert Bacher, judicatories' function expanded beyond "adjudication"; he said that "in recent years these collections of staff, volunteers, and their governance units have taken on even more important roles with greatly expanded responsibilities."

== Functions ==
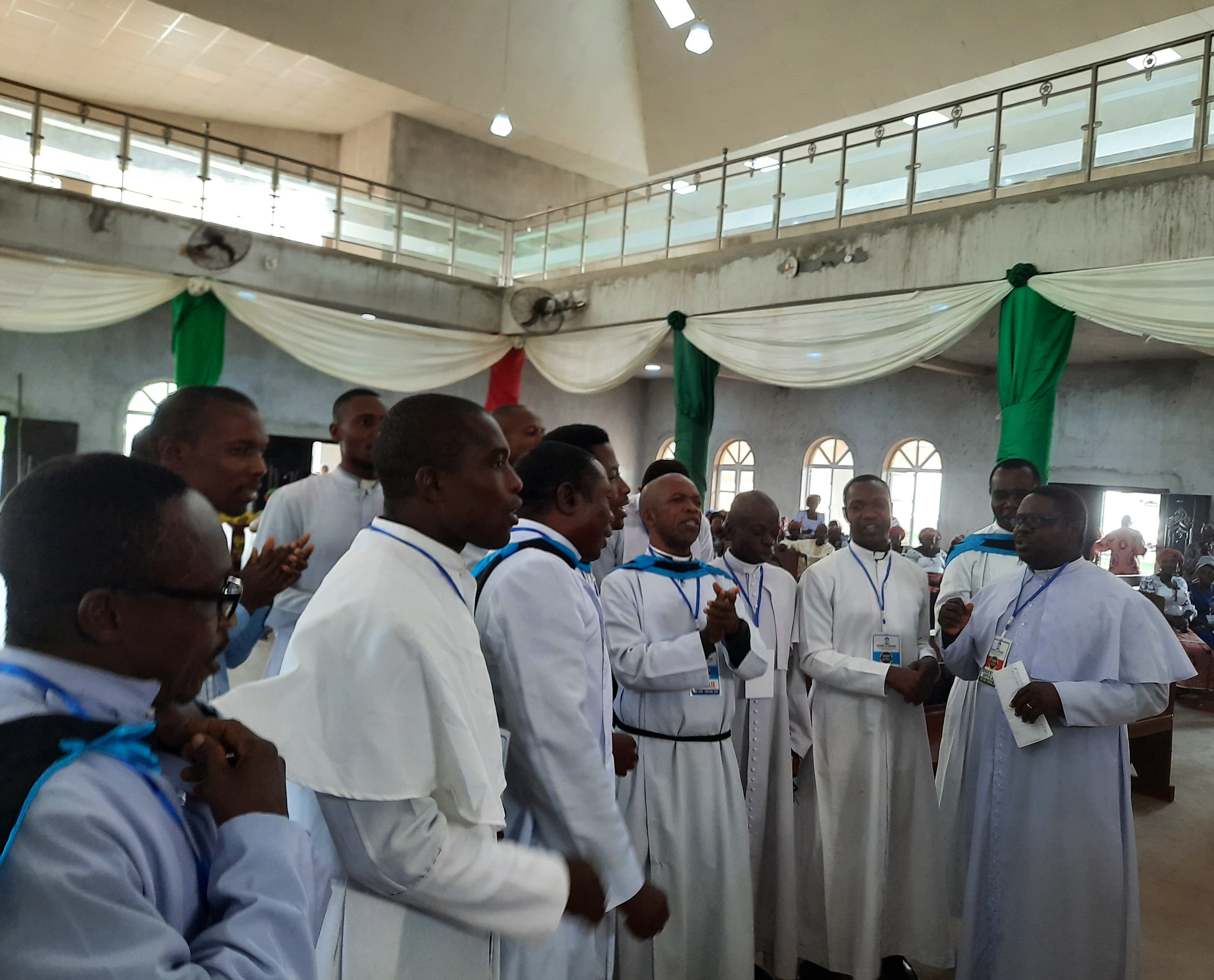
Clergy convene at a synod of the Anglican Diocese of Ndokwa in 2022.

The functions of middle judicatories vary based on different denominations' traditions, but middle judicatories typically make decisions on the ordination and placement of clergy; deliver training and outreach programs; and represent the denomination to the congregation. Consistent with its origins in Presbyterian church courts, middle judicatories are also typically the principal venue for handling issues of clergy discipline. Middle judicatories also often handle matters related to congregational mergers and closure.

Judicatories are usually funded by apportionments or tithes from member congregations. Many middle judicatories use these funds to operate with full- or part-time paid staff, with titles that variously include bishops and assistant bishops, superintendents, executive presbyters, executive ministers, stated clerks and canons. In the mainline Protestant churches, declining attendance and budgets have caused loss of employment at the middle judicatory level. To help middle judicatories support congregations during an era of shrinking mainline churches, late 20th-century commentators on church polity have called on middle judicatories to focus more on building denser networks of communication among their member congregations and to incorporate local congregational perspectives more effectively in the development of policies.

The religion scholar Adair Lummis wrote that effective judicatory operation generally requires greater engagement by judicatory officials (bishops, district superintendents and executive presbyters) at the congregational level, greater choice in which denominational programs congregations can support through their judicatory funding, direct congregational support for critical needs and clear communication about the effects of congregations' contributions to the judicatory body. Likewise, the Methodist religion scholar Jackson W. Carroll said that middle judicatories' role is "best fulfilled when the integrity of the church is respected and envisioning for the future is shared."

=== Criticism ===
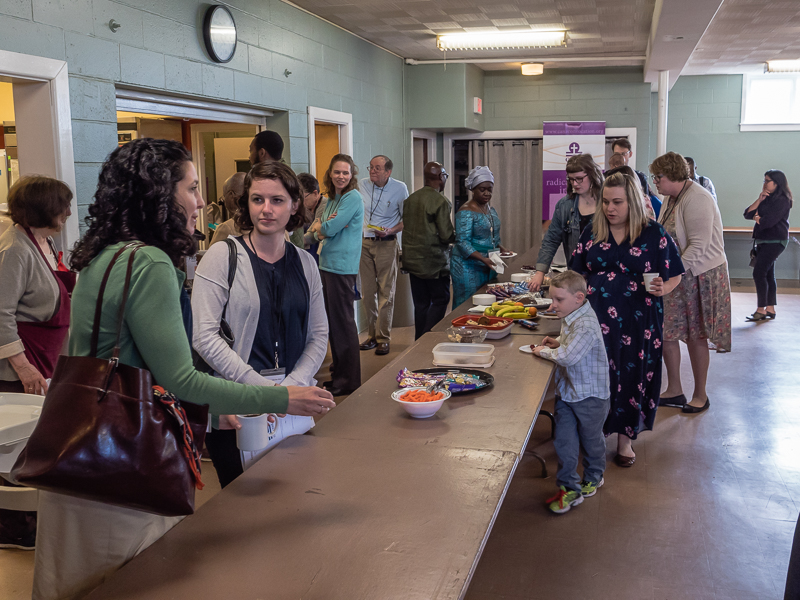
Laypersons participate in the 2018 synod of the Anglican Diocese of CANA East.

Some scholars and observers of religion have questioned the effectiveness of middle judicatories in supporting the local church. Ronald J. Allen, a Disciples of Christ minister and professor of preaching, has compared middle judicatories unfavorably to the leadership model presented in the Acts of the Apostles, stating that "ossification" sometimes impedes a missional focus by leaders, who instead focus on preserving the institution as an institution and accruing power in complicated leadership structures. The United Church of Canada minister Thomas G. Bandy has argued that, when functioning poorly, middle judicatories "build processes of inquisition and censorship" and that they can impose "institutional rules" that curtail innovation and suffocate "transforming congregations" in environments of organizational decline. He has also said that the structure of the middle judicatory, set between a larger church and individual congregations, can be "easily swayed by emerging regional and world issues," forcing congregations away from local issues and pushing changes at the churchwide level before previous priorities have been achieved. In denominations that have significant theological diversity, survey research has found that cooperation at the judicatory level was hampered and engagement by the laity was depressed.

== Lists of middle judicatories ==
=== Anglicanism ===
- List of Church of England dioceses
- List of dioceses of the Anglican Church of Canada
- Ecclesiastical provinces and dioceses of the Episcopal Church
- List of dioceses of the Anglican Church in North America
- List of dioceses of the Philippine Independent Church

=== Eastern Orthodoxy ===
- Eparchies of the Georgian Orthodox Church
- List of the dioceses of the Orthodox Church in America
- List of hierarchs of the Romanian Orthodox Church
- Eparchies and Metropolitanates of the Russian Orthodox Church
- List of eparchies of the Serbian Orthodox Church

=== Lutheranism ===
- List of ELCA synods
- Districts of the Lutheran Church – Missouri Synod
- List of dioceses, deaneries and parishes of the Church of Sweden

=== Methodism ===
- Conferences in Methodism

=== Presbyterianism ===
- List of Church of Scotland synods and presbyteries
- List of Presbyterian Church (USA) synods and presbyteries

=== Religious Society of Friends (Quakers) ===
- Yearly Meetings

=== Roman Catholicism ===
- List of Catholic dioceses (structured view)
- List of eparchies of the Ukrainian Greek Catholic Church

=== Unitarian Universalism ===
- Districts of the Unitarian Universalist Association

=== United churches ===
- List of regional councils of the United Church of Canada

== See also ==
- Ecclesiastical polity
