= Terrell Glenn =

Terrell Glenn may refer to:

- Terrell L. Glenn Sr. (1930–1993), American lawyer and U.S. attorney in South Carolina
- Terrell L. Glenn Jr. (born 1958), American Anglican bishop and son of Terrell L. Glenn Sr.
