= St. Andrew's Church (Mount Pleasant, South Carolina) =

Historic Anglican church in Mount Pleasant, South Carolina, United States

Coordinates: 32°47′18″N 79°52′32″W

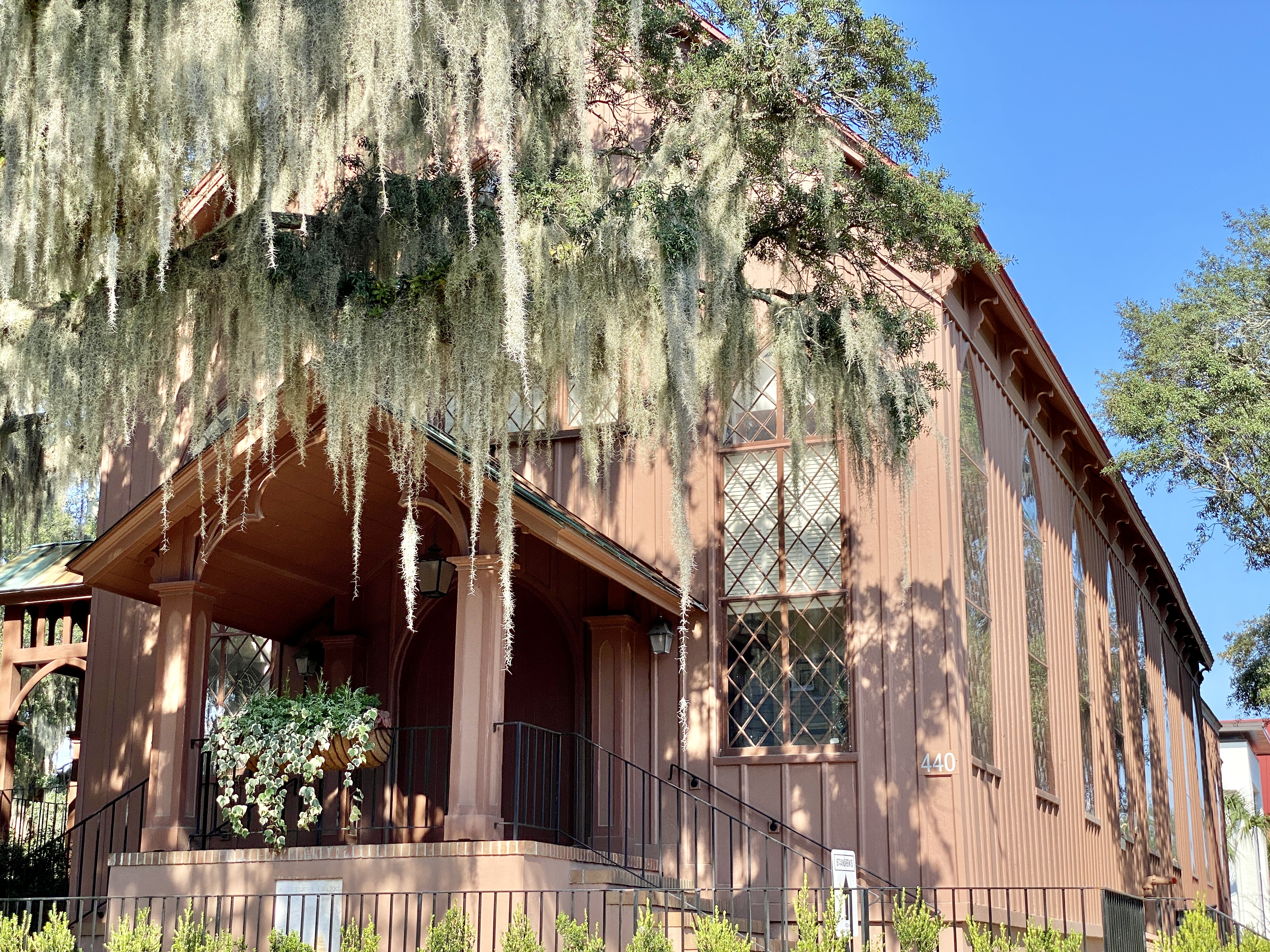
- Location: Mount Pleasant, South Carolina
- Country: United States
- Denomination: Anglican Church in North America
- Website: www.standrews.church

History
- Founded: 1833
- Dedicated: 1857

Architecture
- Architect: Edward Brickell White
- Style: Carpenter Gothic

Administration
- Diocese: Carolinas

Clergy
- Rector: Vacant
- Priest: The Rev. Randy Forrester
- St. Andrew's Church
- U.S. Historic district – Contributing property
- Part of: Mount Pleasant Historic District (ID73001701)
- Added to NRHP: March 30, 1973

St. Andrew's Church is a multisite Anglican congregation in Mount Pleasant, North Charleston, and Charleston, South Carolina. First established in 1835, its 1857 building is a contributing property to the Mount Pleasant Historic District. The church holds services at two other locations: downtown Charleston and North Charleston.

== History ==
St. Andrew's was founded by the Rev. Andrew Fowler, rector of Christ Church in the Episcopal Diocese of South Carolina. Fowler bought a home in the riverside village of Mount Pleasant, where planters from Christ Church Parish would vacation in the summer to avoid malarial conditions inland. Initially Fowler held summer services in his home until the congregants completed building a summer chapel of ease in 1835. St. Andrew's was at the center of the town of Mount Pleasant as it grew and attracted Charlestonians as well. In 1857 and 1858, the congregation built a Carpenter Gothic sanctuary to a design by Charleston architect Edward Brickell White.

The chapel was closed during the Civil War when Union shelling forced many residents of Mount Pleasant to evacuate Upstate. The building re-opened in 1866. St. Andrew's continued as a chapel of ease until 1954, when—with the growth of Mount Pleasant as a Charleston suburb in the mid-20th century due to the Cooper River Bridge—the congregation received parish status.

=== Anglican realignment ===
St. Andrew's developed a reputation as a prominent evangelical congregation within the Episcopal Church. In 1990, the church called the Rev. Terrell Glenn as rector; under Glenn, the church completed a ministry center adjacent to the historic sanctuary in 1996 that allowed the church to hold additional, larger services. As a leader in the Anglican realignment, Glenn stepped down as rector in 1999 and left the Episcopal Church for the Anglican Mission in America. Glenn was succeeded as rector by the Rev. Steve Wood.

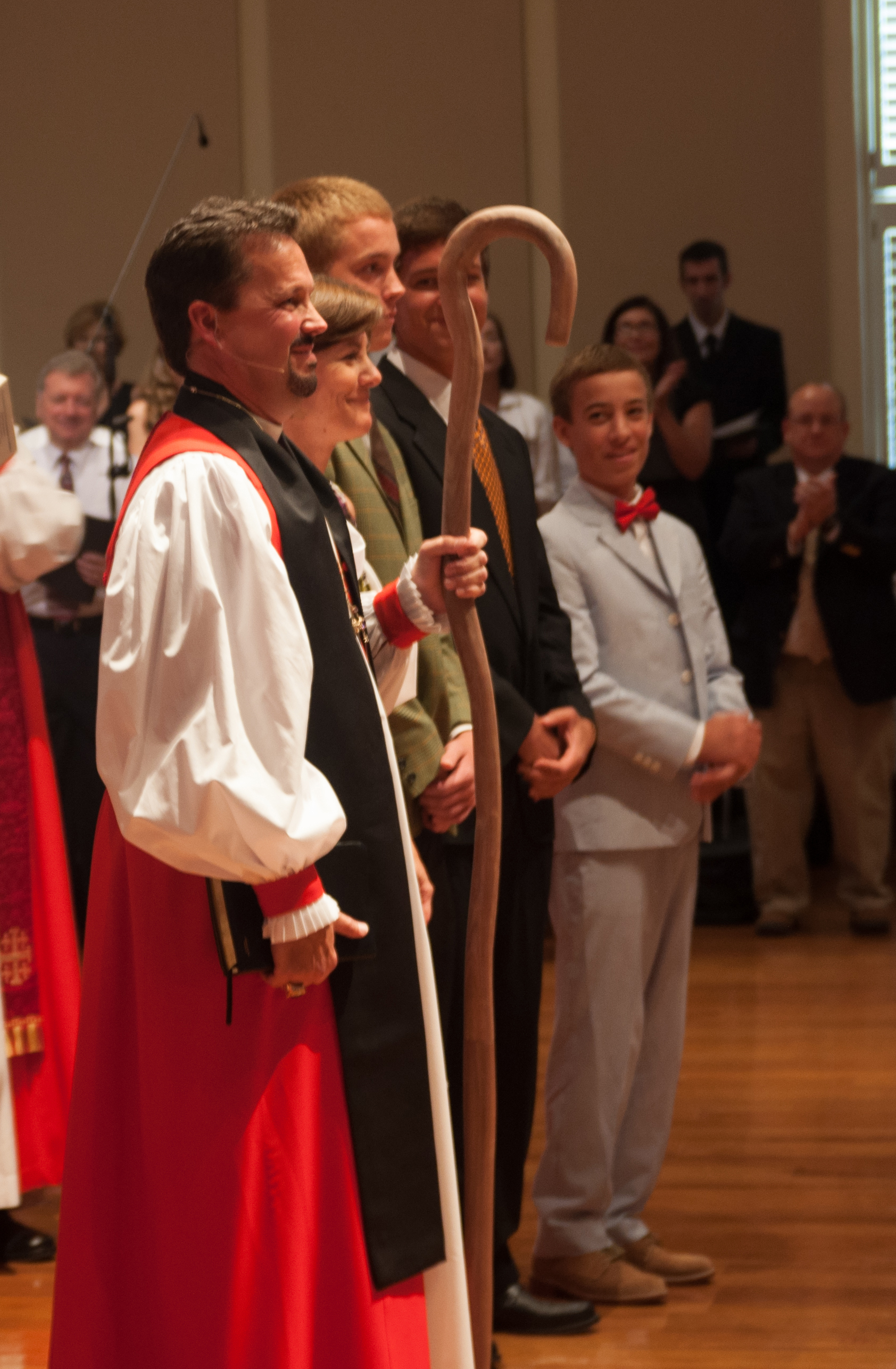
Steve Wood was consecrated as the first bishop of the Diocese of the Carolinas at St. Andrew's Mount Pleasant in 2012.

Under Wood, St. Andrew's continued to grow substantially, reaching 2,800 members with an average Sunday attendance of half that by 2010, and reaching 3,150 members across its campuses by 2012. In 2010, St. Andrew's members voted overwhelmingly to disaffiliate from the Episcopal Diocese of South Carolina and join the newly formed Anglican Church in North America. In the wake of a 2009 South Carolina Supreme Court decision that resulted in All Saints Church in Pawleys Island being able to leave the Episcopal Church with its property, South Carolina Bishop Mark Lawrence did not contest the departure, and in 2011 St. Andrew's received a quitclaim deed—along with all other Diocese of South Carolina parishes—releasing the diocese's claims to parish property under canon law. St. Andrew's in 2012 became a founding congregation of the ACNA Diocese of the Carolinas. Wood was elected the first diocesan bishop and remained rector of St. Andrew's.

=== Fire, rebuilding and COVID-19 ===
An electrical fire in April 2018 resulted in the complete destruction of the 1996 ministry center, although the historic church was unharmed. The Mount Pleasant campus met at Mt. Pleasant Academy, a local elementary school, during the multi-year reconstruction process.

In March 2020, several of St. Andrew's clergy—including Wood—became some of the earliest people with confirmed cases of COVID-19 in South Carolina, contracting the illness at a Diocese of the Carolinas conference. Wood was treated for 10 days on a ventilator in the intensive care unit at East Cooper Hospital. St. Andrew's resumed in-person church services outdoors in June 2020, later than many other Lowcountry churches did.

St. Andrew's dedicated its $20 million expanded Mount Pleasant ministry center in October 2020. The ministry center's sanctuary seats 800 in removable seating to accommodate other gatherings. The center includes a coffee shop and adjoins a three-story building that is home to a preschool facility, youth facilities, a library, classrooms and the offices of the Ridley Institute, St. Andrew's seminary and lay education program. The new center's architecture reflects the Carpenter Gothic design, and its furnishings include the chancel cross, communion table and baptismal font that survived the fire.

In October 2025, the Washington Post reported that Wood was the subject of a formal ecclesiastical presentment involving claims of sexual harassment, abuse of power, and plagiarism. According to the Post, a former children’s ministry director at St. Andrew's accused Wood of forcibly touching her and attempting to kiss her in his office in April 2024 and alleged that Wood gave her thousands of dollars from his discretionary "mercy fund" before the alleged kiss. Wood denied the allegations, stating that he believed they were without merit and that he trusted ACNA's disciplinary processes to "bring clarity and truth." In November, Wood announced his immediate retirement as rector of St. Andrew's.

== Ministries ==
St. Andrew's partners with Christian counseling organizations to refer parishioners needing professional mental health care. “As a pastor, I can do some counseling,” Wood says. “But I was trained in Bible and theology, not counseling. . . . I think good therapy combined with good pastoral care can provide a lot of opportunity for healing.”

St. Andrew's also engages in ministry partnerships with Water Mission and One World Health as well as smaller mission works around the world. Through its Love Charleston initiative the church has partnerships with the East Cooper Faith Network for home repairs, East Cooper Community Outreach, the Lowcountry Crisis Pregnancy Center and the Navigation Center to combat homelessness. Since 1983, St. Andrew's has offered a free medical clinic in Mount Pleasant.

The church hosts the Holy City Fellows service-learning program and Alpha courses in Charleston. St. Andrew's is also home to the Ridley Institute, a training center (named after Nicholas Ridley) for aspiring priests, deacons and laypeople. It offers courses in conjunction with Gordon Conwell Theological Seminary as well as an Anglican studies certificate for ordinands.
