= Cedar Grove Plantation Chapel =

Historic church in South Carolina, United States

- U.S. National Register of Historic Places
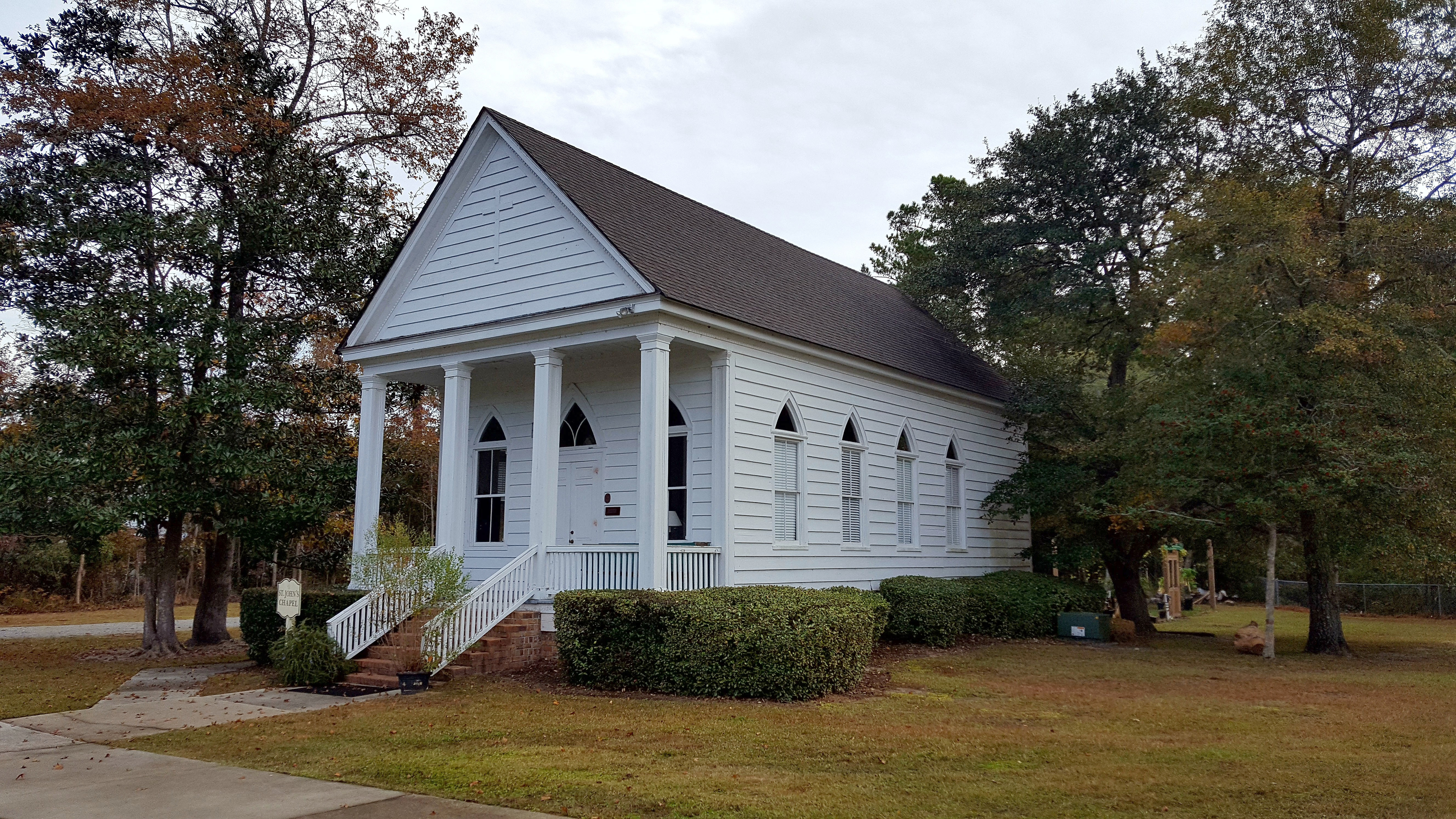

- Location within South Carolina Location within the United States
- Location: South Carolina Highway 255, 0.2 miles north of its junction with South Carolina Highway 46, near Pawleys Island, South Carolina
- Coordinates: 33°28′2″N 79°8′19″W
- Area: less than one acre
- Built: c. 1850
- Architectural style: Vernacular Mid 19th-Century
- MPS: Georgetown County Rice Culture MPS
- NRHP reference No.: 91000231
- Added to NRHP: March 13, 1991

Cedar Grove Plantation Chapel, also known as Summer Chapel, All Saints' Episcopal Church, and Waccamaw, is a historic plantation chapel located near Pawleys Island, Georgetown County, South Carolina. It was built c. 1850, and is a small, frame vernacular Gothic Revival style chapel. It features a pedimented portico supported by four, paneled, square columns. The chapel is associated with All Saints Church.

It was listed on the National Register of Historic Places in 1991.
