= Mount Pleasant Historic District (Mount Pleasant, South Carolina) =

Historic district in South Carolina, United States

- U.S. National Register of Historic Places
- U.S. Historic district
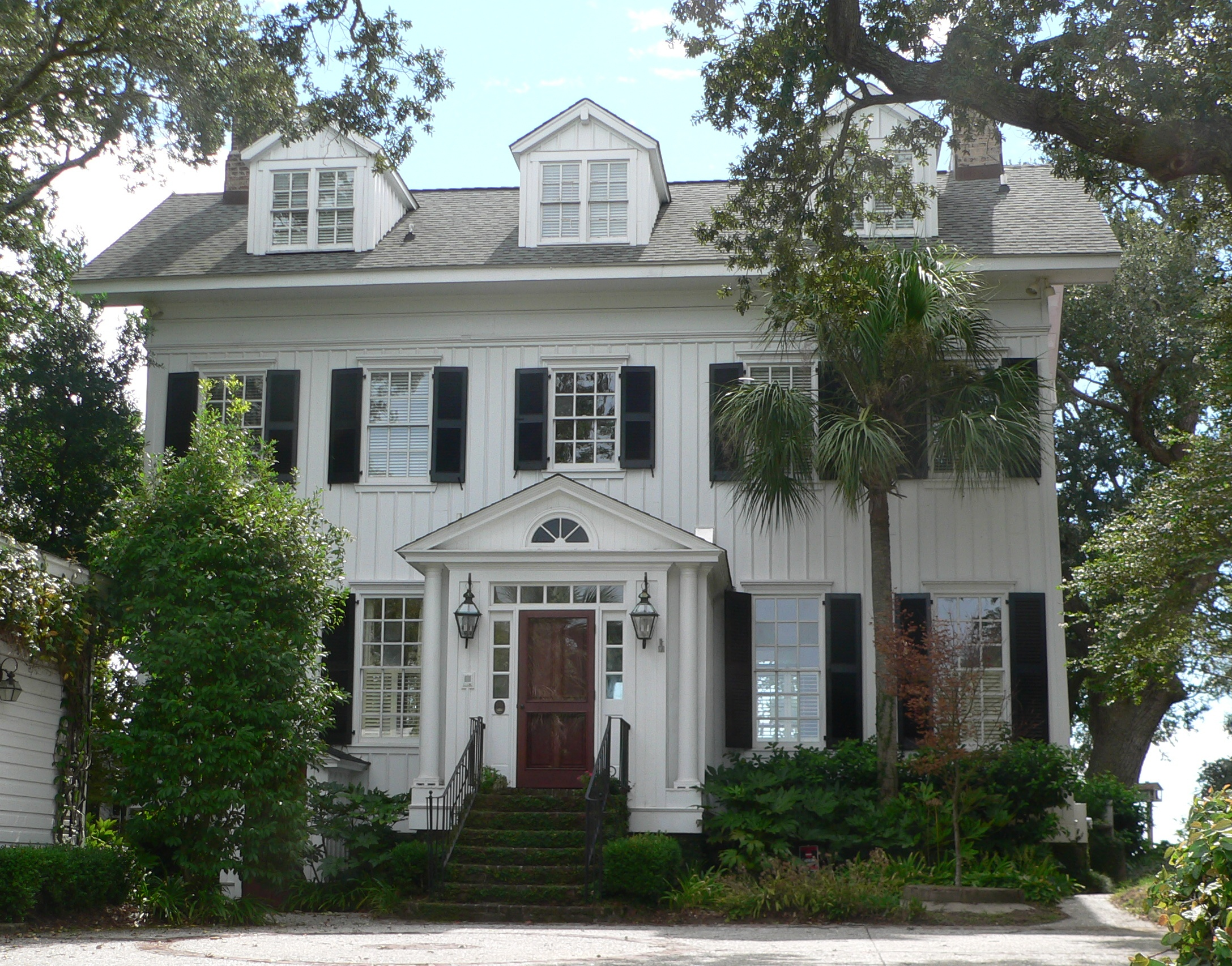
- 200 Bank Street, Mount Pleasant Historic District, September 2011

- Location within South Carolina Location within the United States
- Location: Bounded by Charleston Harbor, Shem Creek, Royal Ave., and McConts Dr., Mount Pleasant, South Carolina
- Coordinates: 32°47′10″N 79°52′33″W
- Area: 61.6 acres (24.9 ha)
- Built: 1900
- Architect: Edward B. White
- Architectural style: Mixed (more than 2 styles from different periods)
- NRHP reference No.: 73001701
- Added to NRHP: March 30, 1973

Mount Pleasant Historic District (also known as Old Village Historic District) is a national historic district located at Mount Pleasant, Charleston County, South Carolina. The district encompasses nine contributing buildings in the town of Mount Pleasant. The dwellings reflect Mount Pleasant's historic role as a summer resort town. The building reflect architectural styles of the 18th, 19th and early 20th centuries, including vernacular Georgian, Greek Revival and Gothic Revival. Notable buildings include the Mount Pleasant Presbyterian Church, St. Andrew's Episcopal Church, Mount Pleasant Seventh-Day Adventist Church, Hibben-McIver House, 200 Bank Street, and the Captain Peter Lewis House. Located in the district is the separately listed Old Courthouse.

It was listed on the National Register of Historic Places in 1973.
