= Old Berkeley County Courthouse (South Carolina) =

- Old Courthouse
- U.S. National Register of Historic Places
- U.S. Historic district – Contributing property
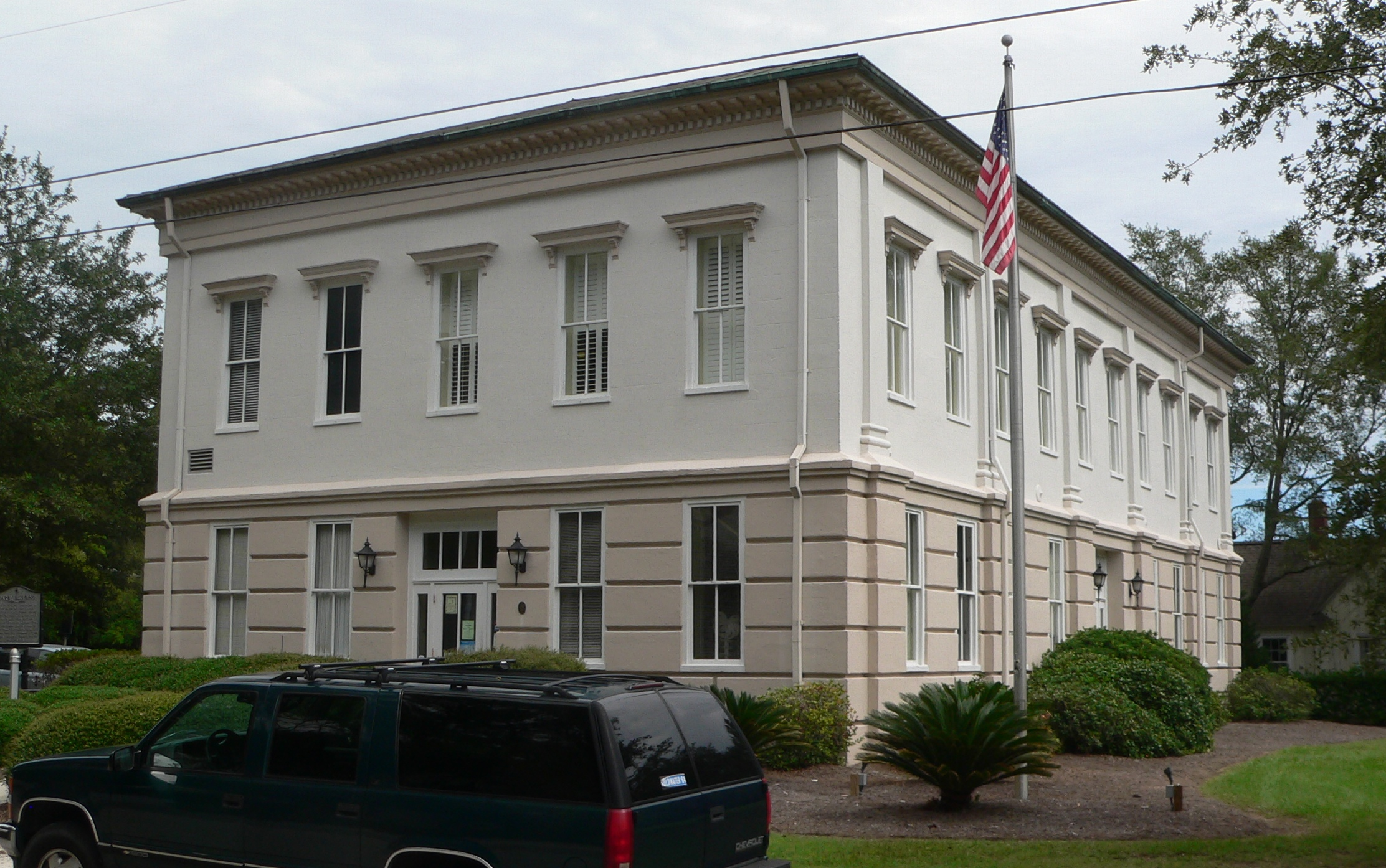
- Old Courthouse, September 2011

- Location within South Carolina Location within the United States
- Location: 331 King St., Mount Pleasant, South Carolina
- Coordinates: 32°47′6″N 79°51′50″W
- Area: 1.1 acres (0.45 ha)
- Built: 1884
- Architectural style: Italianate
- NRHP reference No.: 71000760
- Added to NRHP: May 6, 1971

Old Berkeley County Courthouse, also known as Old Courthouse, is a historic courthouse located at Mount Pleasant, Charleston County, South Carolina. It was built in 1884, and is a two-story, rectangular, stucco over brick building in the Italianate style. It features large matching double stairways leading to the main entrance on the second floor. The building served as county courthouse for Berkeley County from 1884 to 1898. After 1898 until 1968, it was used by both Baptists and Lutherans as a church. It is now known as the G. Mcgrath Darby Building.

It was listed on the National Register of Historic Places in 1971 and is located in the Mount Pleasant Historic District.
