= David Bryan (bishop) =

American Anglican bishop (born 1957)

The Right Reverend David C. Bryan
- Bishop Suffragan, Anglican Diocese of the Carolinas and Assisting Bishop Anglican Diocese of South Carolina
- Church: Anglican Church in North America
- Diocese: Carolinas and Diocese of South Carolina
- In office: 2016–present
- Previous posts: Southeast Network Bishop, PEARUSA

Orders
- Consecration: September 18, 2013 by Onesphore Rwaje and Robert Duncan

Personal details
- Born: 1957 (age 68–69)

David C. Bryan (born 1957) is an American bishop of the Anglican Church in North America. Consecrated in 2013 to serve in PEARUSA, the Anglican Church of Rwanda's missionary district in North America, Bryan has since 2016 been bishop suffragan and area bishop for South Carolina serving Archbishop Steve Wood in the Diocese of the Carolinas. In 2025, Bryan became assisting bishop in the Anglican Diocese of South Carolina to Bishop Chip Edgar. He resigned after he became acting bishop for the Diocese of the Carolinas.

== Early life, education, and early career ==
Bryan grew up in the Episcopal Church. He graduated from the University of Florida in 1979 and from Trinity School for Ministry in 1983. From 1983 to 2001, he was first assistant rector at St. Michael's Episcopal Church in Orlando, then associate rector of the Church of the Good Shepherd in Jacksonville, and finally rector of the Church of St. Luke and St. Peter in St. Cloud, Florida.

In 2001, Bryan succeeded Chuck Murphy as senior pastor of All Saints Episcopal Church, Pawleys Island in the Episcopal Diocese of South Carolina. All Saints Pawleys was at the time an epicenter of activity in the Anglican realignment; Murphy had shortly before been consecrated a bishop by Emmanuel Kolini and Moses Tay, founding the Anglican Mission in America with canonical residence in the Anglican Church of Rwanda. Also in residence during Bryan's time there was AMIA Bishop Thad Barnum; Bryan was succeeded as rector by Terrell Glenn, who became a future AMIA bishop. (Both Glenn and Barnum were in 2022 assisting bishops in the Diocese of the Carolinas.) All Saints was also involved in a landmark case related to property ownership of Episcopal churches in South Carolina in which the state Supreme Court ruled in 2009 that the parish, which predated the Episcopal Church and had changed its articles of incorporation to remove references to the Episcopal Church in 2004, was the owner of its property.

== Episcopacy ==
Bryan left All Saints in 2005 to plant Christ Church, Murrells Inlet, as part of the AMIA. In 2010, AMIA—which had been a founding member of the Anglican Church in North America the year before—left full membership, changing its status in ACNA to "ministry partner." By the next year, the relationship between AMIA chairman Murphy and the Anglican Church of Rwanda had broken down, and (except for Glenn and Barnum), the AMIA bishops removed AMIA from Rwandan jurisdiction and restructured it as a "missionary society."

In early 2012, a majority of AMIA congregations elected to remain canonically in the Rwandan church and pursue full membership and "dual citizenship" in the ACNA, forming PEARUSA. Bryan was named a member of the steering committee for PEARUSA and was elected to serve as bishop of PEARUSA's southeastern network.

On September 18, 2013, Archbishops Onesphore Rwaje and Robert Duncan consecrated Bryan as bishop at the Church of the Apostles in Columbia, South Carolina. In 2014, Bryan designated Church of the Apostles as pro-cathedral of the southeast network.

Bryan continued to serve at Christ Church until 2015. That year, the Anglican Church of Rwanda transferred PEARUSA congregations to sole ACNA jurisdiction. PEARUSA's southeastern network was dissolved, with congregations joining the Diocese of the Carolinas or the Anglican Diocese of the South, depending on their locations. In May 2016, Bryan was elected bishop suffragan in the Diocese of the Carolinas, where he is the South Carolina area bishop, oversees church planting, the finance committee, clergy credentialing and more. He is currently serving as the acting bishop of the Diocese. He also served as assisting bishop for the Anglican Diocese of South Carolina and assisting bishop in the Gulf Atlantic Diocese and the Diocese of the South.

== Personal life ==
Bryan is married to Nancy Duncan Bryan; they have three grown children and eight grandchildren and live in Pawleys Island, SC.
