= Holy Trinity Anglican Church (Raleigh, North Carolina) =

Anglican church in Raleigh, North Carolina

Holy Trinity Church
- Holy Trinity Anglican Church
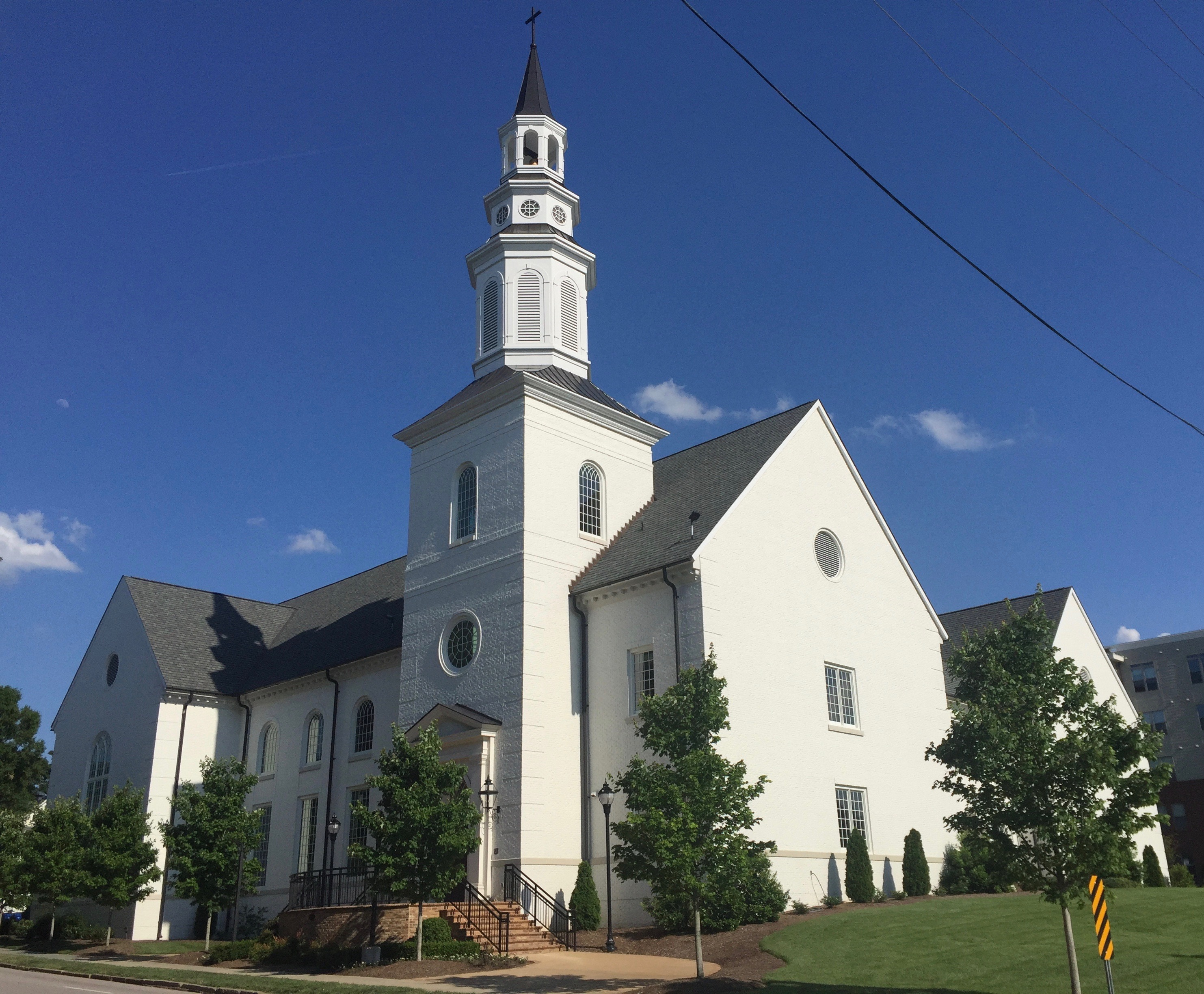
- Holy Trinity Church
- Holy Trinity Church
- 35°47′16″N 78°38′14″W
- Address: 100 East Peace Street, Raleigh, North Carolina
- Country: United States
- Denomination: Anglican Church in North America
- Website: htcraleigh.org

History
- Status: Church
- Founded: 2003
- Dedication: Holy Trinity
- Dedicated: November 8, 2015

Architecture
- Architect: LS3P
- Architectural type: Church
- Style: American Colonial
- Years built: 2014 - 2015
- Construction cost: US$7.5 million

Administration
- Diocese: Carolinas

Clergy
- Rector: Rev. Dr. John W. Yates III
- Pastors: Rev. Claudia Dickson Greggs; Rev. Caleb Burr

Holy Trinity Anglican Church is an Anglican church in downtown Raleigh, North Carolina. Built between 2014 and 2015, it was the first church to open in downtown Raleigh since 1958. Holy Trinity is a member of the Anglican Church in North America and is under the governance of the Diocese of the Carolinas.

== History ==
Holy Trinity Anglican Church started in 2003 by a group of Episcopalians from Raleigh who met weekly to pray for renewal in the Episcopal Church of the United States. The group, which had organized themselves as All Saints Fellowship, grew to two hundred members and began a twelve-week Sunday evening preaching series featuring Anglican preachers from across the United States. Trinity School for Ministry, an Evangelical Anglican seminary, provided support for the preaching series. In 2004 they began holding worship services in the chapel at St. David's School, an Episcopal private school in Raleigh.

On September 12, 2004, the congregation officially launched Holy Trinity Anglican Church, joining the Anglican Communion Network, a theologically conservative network of Episcopal and independent Anglican churches in the United States working toward Anglican realignment. The congregation eventually broke ties with the Episcopal Church and joined the Anglican Church in North America, becoming part of the Diocese of the Carolinas. Garland S. Tucker, former C.E.O of Triangle Capital, was the founding Senior Warden of the church.

In 2010 the church purchased a plot of land across the street from William Peace University, to construct a new church building, and the Jordan House, a Queen Anne Victorian mansion on North Blount Street built in 1898 for Dr. Thomas M. Jordan, to be used as the church offices Construction began on a new church building in June 2014. The new church cost approximately US$7.5 million to build. The church is built in the colonial style. It has over 25,000 square feet (2,300 m^{2}) floor area and has a 130-foot (40 m) tall steeple. When the new building for Holy Trinity opened in September 2015, it was the first church opening to take place in downtown Raleigh since 1958, when Edenton Street United Methodist Church was rebuilt following a fire in 1956. Over five hundred people attended the first service held at the new church building. The church was dedicated by Bishop Steve Wood on November 8, 2015.

Holy Trinity was a winner of the 2016 Downtown Raleigh Alliance Imprint Award.

In September 2017, the clerical leaders of Holy Trinity supported and signed the Reforming Catholic Confession. The church was represented by John Yates at the 2017 Anglican Connection Conference.

== Gallery ==
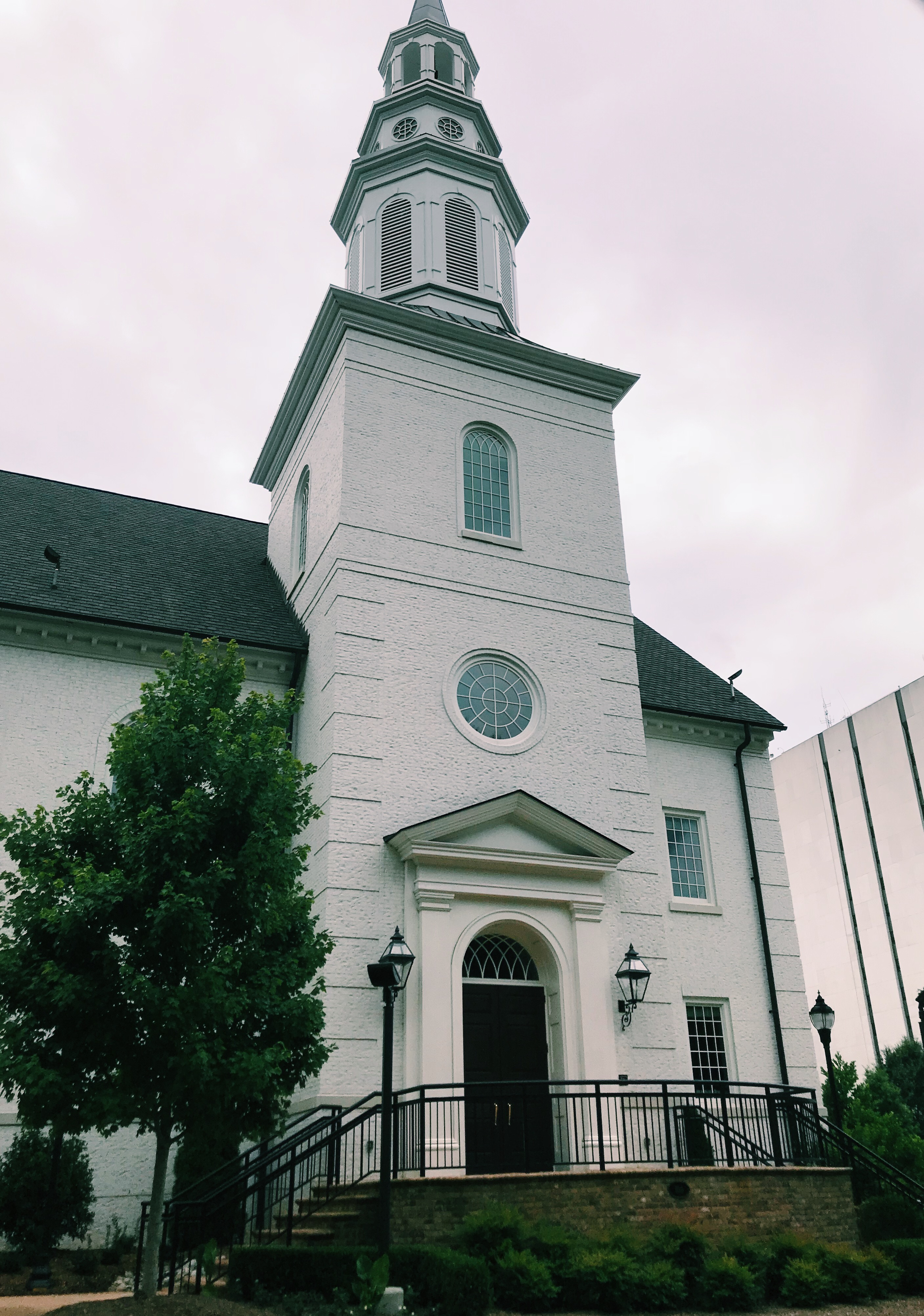
Entrance
