= Thad Barnum =

American Anglican bishop (born 1957)

The Right Reverend Thaddeus R. Barnum
- Assisting Bishop, Anglican Diocese of the Carolinas
- Church: Anglican Church in North America
- Diocese: Carolinas
- Previous posts: Missionary Bishop, Anglican Mission in America

Orders
- Consecration: June 24, 2001 by Emmanuel Kolini

Personal details
- Born: Thaddeus Rockwell Barnum; 1957 (age 68–69)
- Spouse: The Rev. Erilynne Barnum (1937–2020)

Thaddeus Rockwell Barnum (born 1957) is an American bishop of the Anglican Church in North America. Consecrated in 2001 to serve in the Anglican Mission in the Americas, Barnum is now assisting bishop in the Diocese of the Carolinas. He was a key figure in and chronicler of the Anglican realignment in the United States.

== Education and early career ==
Barnum received his seminary degree from Yale Divinity School. While in seminary, he began attending St. Paul's Episcopal Church in Darien, Connecticut, under rector Terry Fullam. St. Paul's was a hub of the charismatic renewal movement in the Episcopal Church in the 1970s. It was at St. Paul's that Barnum met Erilynne Forsberg, twenty years his senior. They married in 1981, and both Barnums served under Fullam until 1987. Erilynne would later be ordained as an Anglican deacon and launch a teaching ministry called Call2Disciple.

In 1987, the Barnums moved to Aliquippa, Pennsylvania, where Thad Barnum was the founding rector of Prince of Peace Episcopal Church in the Episcopal Diocese of Pittsburgh. This church grew to over 300 in attendance. Barnum also served as field education mentor at Trinity School for Ministry, chaplain to the South American Mission Society and chaplain at the crash site of USAir Flight 427. In 1997, the Barnums joined the staff of the North American Missionary Society, and the year after, they joined the staff of All Saints Episcopal Church, Pawleys Island in the Episcopal Diocese of South Carolina.

== Anglican realignment and founding of AMIA ==
All Saints Pawleys was at the time a center of activity in the Anglican realignment. Its longtime rector, Chuck Murphy, was the leader in the "First Promise" movement within the Episcopal Church, which in 1997 "declared the authority of the Episcopal Church to be 'fundamentally impaired' because they no longer upheld the 'truth of the gospel'". The First Promise movement evolved into the Anglican Mission in America; in 2000, Murphy was made a bishop by Emmanuel Kolini and Moses Tay and founded the AMIA with canonical residence in the Anglican Church of Rwanda.

All Saints Pawleys did not immediately disaffiliate from the Episcopal Church. South Carolina Bishop Ed Salmon counseled patience, and Murphy remained affiliated with All Saints but stepped back to "rector emeritus," a post with no canonical allegiance to the bishop of South Carolina. Barnum was appointed interim rector. However, in July 2001, Barnum was himself consecrated as a bishop by Kolini to serve the AMIA alongside T. J. Johnston and two other former Episcopal priests. Barnum remained affiliated with All Saints Pawleys but was succeeded as interim rector by David Bryan. (After All Saints in 2004 changed its articles of incorporation to remove references to the Episcopal Church, the church was involved in a landmark case related to property ownership of Episcopal churches in South Carolina. The state Supreme Court ruled in 2009 that the parish, which predated the Episcopal Church, was the owner of its property regardless of the Dennis Canon.)

== Transition to ACNA ==
The Barnums relocated to Fairfield County, Connecticut, in 2004, where Thad became rector of Church of the Apostles, an AMIA church plant. He remained there until 2015 while also serving as bishop for AMIA congregations in the northeastern United States. In 2008, he published Never Silent, a memoir and account of the Anglican realignment and the involvement of the Anglican Church of Rwanda.

In 2010, AMIA—which had been a founding member of the Anglican Church in North America the year before—left full membership, changing its status in ACNA to "ministry partner." By the next year, the relationship between AMIA chairman Murphy and the Anglican Church of Rwanda had broken down, and (except for Barnum and Terrell Glenn), the AMIA bishops removed AMIA from Rwandan jurisdiction and restructured it as a "missionary society."

In early 2012, a majority of AMIA congregations elected to remain canonically in the Rwandan church and pursue full membership and "dual citizenship" in the ACNA, forming PEARUSA. Barnum and Glenn were given temporary responsibility for PEARUSA congregations pending the election and consecration of new bishops.

== Later life ==
After leaving Apostles in Connecticut in 2015, the Barnums returned to Pawleys Island and focused their time on Call2Disciple. They also provided pastoral care to clergy in the ACNA. Barnum joined the Diocese of the Carolinas as an assisting bishop with a focus on clergy "soul care." On August 6, 2020, Erilynne Barnum died at home in Pawleys Island. The Barnums had four daughters, eleven grandchildren, and one great grandchild.

== Bibliography ==
- Barnum, Thaddeus; Erilynne Barnum (1996). Remember Eve: How the Deceiver Works in the Believer's Life. Longwood Communications. ISBN 978-1883928131.
- Barnum, Thaddeus (1997). Where Is God in Suffering and Tragedy?. Vantage Group. ISBN 978-1883928285.
- Barnum, Thaddeus (2008). Never Silent. Eleison Publishing. ISBN 978-0615206943.
- Barnum, Thaddeus (2013). Real Identity: Where Bible and Life Meet. Wesleyan Publishing House. ISBN 978-0898277555.
- Barnum, Thaddeus (2014). Real Love: Where Bible and Life Meet. Wesleyan Publishing House. ISBN 978-0898279146.
- Barnum, Thaddeus (2015). Real Mercy: Where Bible and Life Meet. Wesleyan Publishing House. ISBN 978-0898279160.
- Barnum, Thaddeus (2016). Real Courage: Where Bible and Life Meet. Wesleyan Publishing House. ISBN 978-1632571670.
