= N. Welch Morrisette Jr. =

American lawyer

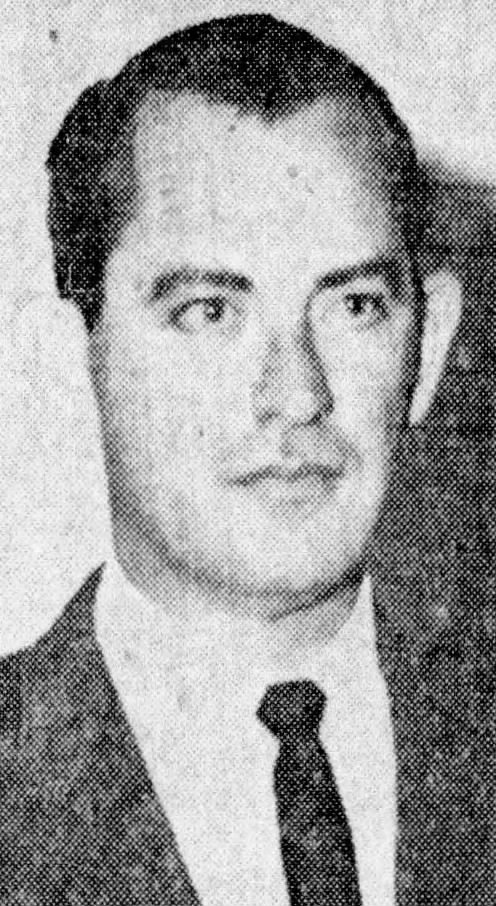
- Morrisette in 1960

United States Attorney for the Eastern District of South Carolina
- In office 1953–1961
- President: Dwight D. Eisenhower
- Succeeded by: Terrell L. Glenn

Personal details
- Born: August 29, 1921; Uniontown, Alabama, U.S.
- Died: August 22, 2011 (aged 89)
- Political party: Republican

N. Welch Morrisette Jr. (August 29, 1921 – August 22, 2011) was an American lawyer.

== Life and career ==
Morrisette was born in Uniontown, Alabama. He was an infantry lieutenant during World War II.

In 1952, Morrisette was a Republican candidate for South Carolina's 2nd district of the United States House of Representatives, but withdrew from the congressional race to help Dwight D. Eisenhower with his presidential campaign.

In 1953, President Eisenhower appointed Morrisette to serve as United States Attorney for the Eastern District of South Carolina. He served until 1961, when he was succeeded by Terrell L. Glenn.

Morrisette died on August 22, 2011, at the age of 89.
