= Governance structure of the United Church of Canada =

The United Church of Canada uses a three-level model of governance, consisting of communities of faith; regional councils; and the General Council.

== Governance structure ==
=== Communities of faith ===
There are currently just over 2,000 communities of faith, which are the basic unit of the United Church, consisting of one or more congregations under the spiritual leadership of a minister or ministry team. The community of faith is responsible for their day-to-day operations, including worship, programming, mission, building maintenance and finances, local committee work and projects. The community of faith, is also responsible for searching out and hiring church staff, including ministers, musicians and lay staff; maintenance and upkeep of their property and buildings; deciding when they worship, and how often; policies on candidacy for baptism and marriage (including, but not limited to whether the congregation will allow same-sex marriages to be performed in their building); Christian development and education within the congregation (Sunday School, youth and adult confirmation classes, Bible study, etc.); outreach projects to the community and wider world; and other day-to-day functions. Policy decisions at this level are usually made by a congregational Board or Council which can take one of several forms, as listed in the United Church policy and doctrine handbook, known as The Manual. Certain items, including budgets, major financial expenses, renovations, election of board members and changes to ministry personnel must be approved at a meeting of the full congregation. Other decisions must be approved by or made with the support of a Regional Council.

=== Regional councils ===
Map of the 16 regional councils in Canada

Communities of faith are grouped into sixteen regional councils, which are responsible for a variety of tasks, including the care and oversight of the communities of faith within it.

The regional councils draw their membership and leadership from their communities of faith, supported by paid resource staff — each community of faith, depending on its size, elects between 1-4 of its members to serve on the regional council. In addition to these lay members, all ministers, both active and retired, within the area of the regional council are also members of the United Church through the regional council. (This is unlike some other denominations where the clergy's membership resides within a local congregation or community of faith.) If needed, the regional council can also seek out other members of the wider church to sit on committees and task groups in order to better represent the diversity, skill and gifts of the entire United Church.

Regional councils are responsible for a variety of tasks within the wider church, including recognizing, supporting and living in covenantal relationship with ministry students, candidates and other personnel; supporting, servicing and overseeing the work of communities of faith; engaging in local, national and global initiatives and partnerships for mission, ministry, ecumenism and justice; implementing and setting policy; and, along with the General Council, working towards joining the church's "collective hearts, voices, and resources to witness to the gospel and vision of Jesus for a compassionate and just society, both in Canada and around the world."

=== General Council ===
General Council has 260 members:

- the current Moderator (the spiritual head of the church, elected at the first meeting of the current General Council)
- the immediate past Moderator
- the General Secretary
- the leaders of the sixteen regional councils and 204 members elected by the regional councils
- fifteen members chosen by the National Indigenous Organization
- the Executive of the General Council

The Executive then elects enough members to bring the total number to 260, choosing members who will ensure diversity in gender, age, racial and cultural identities and sexual expressions.

The term of service on General Council is three years. At the start of their term, all members meet in person to

- set denominational policy and doctrine;
- debate and discuss proposals and other work which appropriately comes before the highest council of the church;
- and elect a new Moderator

Following their first meeting, the members of the General Council then meet annually, either through electronic means or in person, to fulfill corporate legal requirements and for other business as determined by the Executive. Between meetings of the full General Council, an Executive serves to deal with any urgent and emergent matters, although it is possible for the full body of the General Council to be recalled for special or specific purposes.

The General Council is responsible for

- setting a budget for the church
- oversight of regional councils
- dealing with proposals received from regional councils and members of General Council
- appeals of decisions of the Board of Vocation, decisions from formal hearings held by communities of faith or regional councils
- theological schools related to the United Church
- human resource policies within the church
- the church's archives

The General Council Office consists of the Moderator, the General Secretary and other support staff to the General Council, as well as members of the four permanent committees of the General Council, seven major working units and various other committees and task groups. The General Council Office is under the complete direction of the larger General Council and has a mandate to carry out the work which is given to them by the General Council.

== Regional councils ==
Name of Region	Description	Approximate Number of Communities of Faith in Region
Pacific Mountain Region	The majority of British Columbia; Banff, Alberta; Yukon	174
Northern Spirit Region	Northeastern British Columbia, including Fort Nelson, Fort St. John and surrounding areas. Northern Alberta, above and including Highway 13; The Northwest Territories	95
Chinook Winds Region	Southern Alberta, excluding Banff	91
Living Skies Region	Saskatchewan	172
Prairie to Pine Region	Manitoba; All of Northwestern Ontario within the Central Time Zone	144
Canadian Shield Region	All of Northwestern Ontario within the Eastern Time Zone; Northeastern Ontario; Manitoulin Island; Abitibi-Témiscamingue Region, Quebec; Algoma District	78
Antler River Watershed Region	Southwestern Ontario, including London and Windsor	141
Western Ontario Waterways Region	Bruce Peninsula; Huron County; Perth County; Kitchener-Waterloo; Angus, Borden, Owen Sound and surrounding area	138
Horseshoe Falls Region	Brant, Haldimand, and Norfolk Counties; Mississauga; Hamilton; Halton Region; Niagara Region	143
Shining Waters Region	The majority of the Greater Toronto Area. Muskoka Region; Other communities north of Toronto, including Barrie and Orillia	160
East Central Ontario Region	Southeastern Ontario and Durham Region, excluding the Ottawa Valley, Brockville and surrounding areas.	146
Eastern Ontario Outaouais Region	Ottawa, Ontario and the Ottawa Valley; Southeastern Ontario-Quebec border region including Brockville, Smiths Falls, Prescott and Hawkesbury	133
Nakonha:ka	All of Quebec, excluding the Outaouais/Pontiac areas Abitibi-Témiscamingue Region and the Gaspé Peninsula; Nunavut	76
Fundy St. Lawrence Dawning Waters Region	Gaspé Peninsula; New Brunswick; Prince Edward Island	116
Bermuda-Nova Scotia Region	Nova Scotia; Bermuda	139
First Dawn Eastern Edge Region	Newfoundland and Labrador	88

== Administrative structure of General Council ==
General Council
General Secretary	Moderator
Permanent Committee on Programs for Mission and Ministry	Permanent Committee on Ministry & Employment Policies and Services
Aboriginal Ministries Circle	Executive of the General Council
Permanent Committee on Governance & Agenda	Permanent Committee on Finance
General Council Office Staff Working Units
Church in Mission	Indigenous Ministries and Justice	Finance
Philanthropy	Ministry & Employment	Communications
Office of the Moderator & General Secretary

Archives Committee
Audit Committee
Judicial Committee
Manual Committee
Theology and Inter-Church Inter-Faith Committee
Nominations Committee

== Previous model of governance (1925-2018) ==
From 1925 to 2018, the church used a four-court model of governance, consisting of pastoral charges; presbyteries; conferences and the General Council.

- Pastoral charges referred to one or more congregations or preaching points.
- These were gathered into 88 regional presbyteries, 2 districts and one synod that covered all parts of Canada and Bermuda. The number of pastoral charges and presbyteries varied over time; in 2017, there were approximately 3000 pastoral charges gathered into 91 presbyteries.
- Presbyteries were gathered into thirteen Conferences, which were regional. The exception to the regional model was the All Native Circle Conference, representing congregations that identified with Aboriginal groups across Canada.

Name of Conference	Regions Covered	Names of Presbyteries	Regions Covered
All Native Circle Conference	First Nations congregations across much of Canada including: British Columbia; Alberta; Saskatchewan; Manitoba; Ontario; Quebec	All Tribes Presbytery	First Nations in Alberta
All Native Circle Conference	First Nations congregations across much of Canada including: British Columbia; Alberta; Saskatchewan; Manitoba; Ontario; Quebec	Great Lakes Waterways Presbytery	First Nations in Ontario and Quebec
All Native Circle Conference	First Nations congregations across much of Canada including: British Columbia; Alberta; Saskatchewan; Manitoba; Ontario; Quebec	Keewatin Presbytery	First Nations in Northern Manitoba and Northwestern Ontario
All Native Circle Conference	First Nations congregations across much of Canada including: British Columbia; Alberta; Saskatchewan; Manitoba; Ontario; Quebec	Plains Presbytery	First Nations in the Prairies
British Columbia Conference	British Columbia	Cariboo Presbytery	Central and Interior British Columbia
British Columbia Conference	British Columbia	Comox-Nanaimo Presbytery	Northern Vancouver Island
British Columbia Conference	British Columbia	Fraser Presbytery	Southwestern BC mainland
British Columbia Conference	British Columbia	Kamloops-Okanagan Presbytery	South-Central BC and the Okanogan Valley
British Columbia Conference	British Columbia	Kootenay Presbytery	Southeastern BC mainland
British Columbia Conference	British Columbia	Prince Rupert Presbytery	Northwestern BC mainland
British Columbia Conference	British Columbia	Vancouver-Burrard Presbytery	City of North Vancouver, Northern area of Vancouver, Pemberton, Squamish, West Vancouver, Whistler
British Columbia Conference	British Columbia	Vancouver South Presbytery	Ladner, Richmond, Tsawwassen First Nation, Southern Vancouver
British Columbia Conference	British Columbia	Victoria Presbytery	Southern Vancouver Island, Gulf Islands, Victoria
British Columbia Conference	British Columbia	Westminster Presbytery	Burnaby, Coquitlam, New Westminster, Port Moody
Alberta Northwest Conference	Alberta; Yukon; Northwest Territories; Northeastern British Columbia	Calgary Presbytery	Calgary
Alberta Northwest Conference	Alberta; Yukon; Northwest Territories; Northeastern British Columbia	Coronation Presbytery	East-Central Alberta including Drumheller, Camrose
Alberta Northwest Conference	Alberta; Yukon; Northwest Territories; Northeastern British Columbia	Edmonton Presbytery	Edmonton
Alberta Northwest Conference	Alberta; Yukon; Northwest Territories; Northeastern British Columbia	Foothills Presbytery	South-Central Alberta including Banff
Alberta Northwest Conference	Alberta; Yukon; Northwest Territories; Northeastern British Columbia	Northern Lights Presbytery	Northwestern Alberta, Northeastern BC, Yukon, Northwest Territories
Alberta Northwest Conference	Alberta; Yukon; Northwest Territories; Northeastern British Columbia	Red Deer Presbytery	Red Deer and Central Alberta
Alberta Northwest Conference	Alberta; Yukon; Northwest Territories; Northeastern British Columbia	Saint Paul Presbytery	North-Central Alberta
Alberta Northwest Conference	Alberta; Yukon; Northwest Territories; Northeastern British Columbia	South Alberta Presbytery	Southern Alberta
Alberta Northwest Conference	Alberta; Yukon; Northwest Territories; Northeastern British Columbia	Yellowhead Presbytery	Northeastern Alberta
Saskatchewan Conference	Saskatchewan	Chinook Presbytery	Southwestern Saskatchewan
Saskatchewan Conference	Saskatchewan	Good Spirit Presbytery	Eastern Saskatchewan
Saskatchewan Conference	Saskatchewan	Prairie Pine Presbytery	Western Saskatchewan
Saskatchewan Conference	Saskatchewan	River Bend Presbytery	Saskatoon and Central Saskatchewan
Saskatchewan Conference	Saskatchewan	Tamarack Presbytery	Northern Saskatchewan including Prince Albert
Saskatchewan Conference	Saskatchewan	Twin Valleys Presbytery	Southeastern Saskatchewan including Qu'Appelle
Saskatchewan Conference	Saskatchewan	Wascana Presbytery	The city of Regina and surrounding areas
Conference of Manitoba and Northwestern Ontario	Manitoba; Northwestern Ontario	Assiniboine Presbytery	Southwestern Manitoba including Brandon
Conference of Manitoba and Northwestern Ontario	Manitoba; Northwestern Ontario	Agassiz Presbytery	Southern Manitoba
Conference of Manitoba and Northwestern Ontario	Manitoba; Northwestern Ontario	Cambrian Presbytery	Northwestern Ontario including Marathon, Red Lake, Thunder Bay
Conference of Manitoba and Northwestern Ontario	Manitoba; Northwestern Ontario	Northland Presbytery	Northwestern and Western Manitoba
Conference of Manitoba and Northwestern Ontario	Manitoba; Northwestern Ontario	Selkirk Presbytery	Southeastern Manitoba
Conference of Manitoba and Northwestern Ontario	Manitoba; Northwestern Ontario	Winnipeg Presbytery	The city of Winnipeg
Manitou Conference	Northeastern Ontario; Manitoulin Island; Abitibi-Témiscamingue Region, Quebec	North Bay Presbytery	The city of North Bay and surrounding area
Manitou Conference	Northeastern Ontario; Manitoulin Island; Abitibi-Témiscamingue Region, Quebec	Spirit Dancing Presbytery	Abitibi-Témiscamingue, Cochrance, Kapuskasing, Timiskaming, Timmins and surrounding areas
Manitou Conference	Northeastern Ontario; Manitoulin Island; Abitibi-Témiscamingue Region, Quebec	Sudbury Presbytery	Elliot Lake, Manitoulin Island, Sudbury and surrounding areas
London Conference	Southwestern Ontario; Algoma District	Algoma Presbytery	The Algoma District and the Eastern coast of Lake Superior including Sault Sainte-Marie, Manitouwadge, Wawa
London Conference	Southwestern Ontario; Algoma District	Elgin Presbytery	Elgin County
London Conference	Southwestern Ontario; Algoma District	Essex Presbytery	Essex County including the city of Windsor
London Conference	Southwestern Ontario; Algoma District	Huron-Perth Presbytery	Huron County and Perth County
London Conference	Southwestern Ontario; Algoma District	Kent Presbytery	Chatham-Kent
London Conference	Southwestern Ontario; Algoma District	Lambton Presbytery	Lambton County
London Conference	Southwestern Ontario; Algoma District	Middlesex Presbytery	Middlesex County
London Conference	Southwestern Ontario; Algoma District	Oxford Presbytery	Oxford County
Hamilton Conference	Bruce Peninsula; Hamilton; Niagara Region; Kitchener-Waterloo	Bruce Presbytery	Bruce Peninsula
Hamilton Conference	Bruce Peninsula; Hamilton; Niagara Region; Kitchener-Waterloo	Erie Presbytery	Brant County, Haldimand County, Norfolk County
Hamilton Conference	Bruce Peninsula; Hamilton; Niagara Region; Kitchener-Waterloo	Halton Presbytery	Regional Municipality of Halton including Oakville
Hamilton Conference	Bruce Peninsula; Hamilton; Niagara Region; Kitchener-Waterloo	Hamilton Presbytery	The city of Hamilton
Hamilton Conference	Bruce Peninsula; Hamilton; Niagara Region; Kitchener-Waterloo	Niagara Presbytery	The Niagara Region
Hamilton Conference	Bruce Peninsula; Hamilton; Niagara Region; Kitchener-Waterloo	Waterloo Presbytery	Cambridge, Guelph, Kitchener-Waterloo and surrounding areas
Toronto Conference	The Greater Toronto Area; Muskoka Region	Living Waters Presbytery	Muskoka Region and communities north of Toronto including Barrie
Toronto Conference	The Greater Toronto Area; Muskoka Region	Northern Waters Presbytery	Angus, Borden, Durham, Owen Sound and surrounding areas
Toronto Conference	The Greater Toronto Area; Muskoka Region	South West Presbytery	Southwestern region of the Greater Toronto Area
Toronto Conference	The Greater Toronto Area; Muskoka Region	Toronto Southeast Presbytery	Southeastern region of the Greater Toronto Area
Bay of Quinte Conference	Southeastern Ontario	Four Rivers Presbytery	Brockville, Smiths Falls, Perth and surrounding areas
Bay of Quinte Conference	Southeastern Ontario	Four Winds Presbytery	Bath, Harrowsmith, Kingston, Wolfe Island and surrounding areas
Bay of Quinte Conference	Southeastern Ontario	Hills and Shores Presbytery	Brighton, Campbellford, Cobourg, Trenton and surrounding areas
Bay of Quinte Conference	Southeastern Ontario	Kawartha Highlands Presbytery	Beaverton, Haliburton County, Kawartha Lakes
Bay of Quinte Conference	Southeastern Ontario	Kente Presbytery	Belleville, Madoc, Prince Edward County
Bay of Quinte Conference	Southeastern Ontario	Lakeridge Presbytery	Ajax, Oshawa, Whitby and surrounding areas
Bay of Quinte Conference	Southeastern Ontario	Shining Waters Presbytery	Bancroft, Peterborough and surrounding areas
Bay of Quinte Conference	Southeastern Ontario	Upper Valley Presbytery	Arnprior, Denbigh, Pembroke, Renfrew and surrounding areas
Synode Montréal et Ottawa Conference	Ottawa, Ontario; Most of Quebec; Nunavut	Le Consistoire Laurentien	Laurentians, Numerous francophone congregations throughout Quebec
Synode Montréal et Ottawa Conference	Ottawa, Ontario; Most of Quebec; Nunavut	Montréal Presbytery	Laval, The city of Montreal, Saint-Jean-sur-Richelieu and surrounding areas
Synode Montréal et Ottawa Conference	Ottawa, Ontario; Most of Quebec; Nunavut	Ottawa Presbytery	The city of Ottawa, the Eastern Ottawa Valley and Gatineau, Quebec
Synode Montréal et Ottawa Conference	Ottawa, Ontario; Most of Quebec; Nunavut	Quebec-Sherbrooke Presbytery	Western, Central and Northern Quebec and the entirety of Nunavut, including the Côte-Nord region, the Eastern Townships, Nord-du-Quebec region and Quebec City
Synode Montréal et Ottawa Conference	Ottawa, Ontario; Most of Quebec; Nunavut	Seaway Valley Presbytery	Southeastern Ontario-Quebec border region including Prescott and Hawkesbury
Maritime Conference	Gaspé Peninsula; New Brunswick; Nova Scotia; Prince Edward Island; Bermuda	Bermuda Synod	Bermuda
Maritime Conference	Gaspé Peninsula; New Brunswick; Nova Scotia; Prince Edward Island; Bermuda	Chignecto Presbytery	Southeastern New Brunswick and Western Nova Scotia including Amherst, Moncton, Sackville, Springhill and surrounding areas
Maritime Conference	Gaspé Peninsula; New Brunswick; Nova Scotia; Prince Edward Island; Bermuda	Halifax Presbytery	Halifax Regional Municipality, Nova Scotia
Maritime Conference	Gaspé Peninsula; New Brunswick; Nova Scotia; Prince Edward Island; Bermuda	Inverness-Guysborough Presbytery	Northeastern mainland of Nova Scotia and western Cape Breton including Guysborough County and Inverness County
Maritime Conference	Gaspé Peninsula; New Brunswick; Nova Scotia; Prince Edward Island; Bermuda	Miramichi Presbytery	Northern and Northeastern New Brunswick, Gaspé Peninsula including Miramichi, Bathurst, Campbellton, and Percé
Maritime Conference	Gaspé Peninsula; New Brunswick; Nova Scotia; Prince Edward Island; Bermuda	Prince Edward Island Presbytery	Prince Edward Island
Maritime Conference	Gaspé Peninsula; New Brunswick; Nova Scotia; Prince Edward Island; Bermuda	Pictou Presbytery	Northwestern mainland of Nova Scotia including Pictou County and Antigonish County
Maritime Conference	Gaspé Peninsula; New Brunswick; Nova Scotia; Prince Edward Island; Bermuda	Saint John Presbytery	South-Central New Brunswick and the city of Saint John
Maritime Conference	Gaspé Peninsula; New Brunswick; Nova Scotia; Prince Edward Island; Bermuda	South Shore Presbytery	Southern Nova Scotia including the South Shore
Maritime Conference	Gaspé Peninsula; New Brunswick; Nova Scotia; Prince Edward Island; Bermuda	Saint Croix Presbytery	Southwestern New Brunswick
Maritime Conference	Gaspé Peninsula; New Brunswick; Nova Scotia; Prince Edward Island; Bermuda	Sydney Presbytery	Cape Breton Regional Municipality, Victoria County and Richmond County
Maritime Conference	Gaspé Peninsula; New Brunswick; Nova Scotia; Prince Edward Island; Bermuda	Truro Presbytery	Central Nova Scotia and the Northumberland Shore
Maritime Conference	Gaspé Peninsula; New Brunswick; Nova Scotia; Prince Edward Island; Bermuda	Valley Presbytery	The Annapolis Valley region of Nova Scotia and Digby County
Maritime Conference	Gaspé Peninsula; New Brunswick; Nova Scotia; Prince Edward Island; Bermuda	Woolastook Presbytery	Central and Western New Brunswick including Fredericton, Edmundston
Newfoundland and Labrador Conference	Newfoundland and Labrador	Western District	Western Newfoundland and Labrador including Port-aux-Basques, Saint Anthony, Happy Valley-Goose Bay, Forteau, Labrador
Newfoundland and Labrador Conference	Newfoundland and Labrador	Eastern District	Eastern Newfoundland including the Avalon Peninsula and Fortune
