= Church of the Apostles (Columbia, South Carolina) =

Anglican cathedral in Columbia, South Carolina

Coordinates: 34°00′27″N 81°01′50″W

Cathedral Church of the Apostles
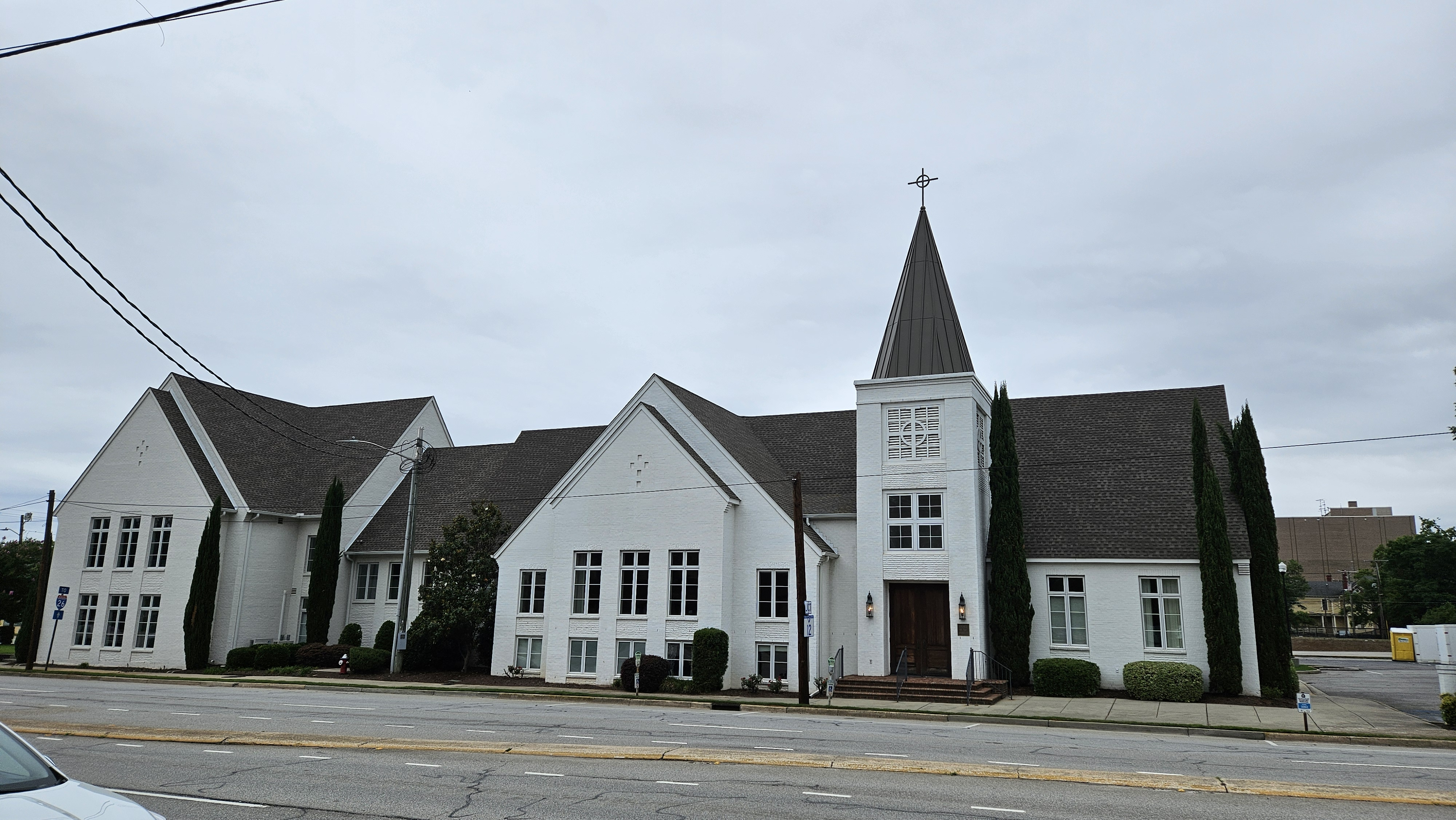
- Church of the Apostles in 2026
- Cathedral Church of the Apostles
- Location: Columbia, South Carolina
- Country: United States
- Denomination: Anglican Church in North America
- Website: apostlescolumbia.org

History
- Founded: 2004
- Founder: The Rt. Rev. Chip Edgar
- Dedicated: 2011

Architecture
- Years built: 1956-1964

Administration
- Diocese: Carolinas

Clergy
- Bishop(s): The Most Rev. Steve Wood (diocesan); The Rt. Rev. David Bryan (suffragan)
- Dean: The Very Rev. Eric J. Speece

The Church of the Apostles is an Evangelical Anglican church in downtown Columbia, South Carolina. Founded in 2003 as part of the Anglican realignment, it serves today as the cathedral parish for the Diocese of the Carolinas.

== History ==
=== History of the building ===
Apostles' current building at 1520 Bull Street was originally occupied by the Second Calvary Baptist Church, a historically African-American congregation. Second Calvary was founded in 1889 and dedicated a building on the present site in 1891. The current edifice was constructed between 1956 and 1964. In 2006, Second Calvary completed construction on a new church building in a different area of Columbia and sold the Bull Street building.

=== Early history of Apostles ===
Church of the Apostles was planted in 2003 and officially founded in 2004 as part of the Anglican Mission in America, a group of breakaway Episcopalians whose clergy were canonically resident in the Anglican Church of Rwanda. The Rev. Chip Edgar, a former Episcopal Church priest in Illinois, was the founding rector, leading a group of 25 parishioners. In the church's early years, it met in the auditorium of the South Carolina State Museum.

After Second Calvary vacated the Bull Street building, Apostles purchased it and renovated the church, occupying the space for worship services in 2011. In 2016, Apostles raised $1 million toward a building expansion and program funds and tithed $100,000 to the Rwandan Anglican church. “We owe a debt to Rwanda,” said Edgar. “We couldn’t pay down our own financial debt without acknowledging in a tangible way the spiritual debt we owe the Church of Rwanda for the critical role they played in the formation of the ACNA.”

=== Designation as a cathedral ===
In 2014, after several AMIA churches had left the organization to become part of PEARUSA, Church of the Apostles was designated as pro-cathedral of PEARUSA's Southeast Network. In 2016, the PEARUSA Southeast Network dissolved and Church of the Apostles joined the Diocese of the Carolinas, where it was designated as the diocesan cathedral and Edgar as dean.

In 2021, Edgar was elected as the second ACNA bishop of South Carolina and consecrated the following year. At the time of his departure, Apostles had grown from 25 to 550 in average Sunday attendance.

== Architecture ==
Apostles' exterior—a modern colonial style faced with white-painted brick—and interior have been described as "austere." The nave, laid out in a cruciform plan, seats 450. The campus includes a side chapel.

The cathedral's Möller Op. 4748 pipe organ dates to 1927.

== Programs ==
The Church of the Apostles places emphasis on continued works of church planting; between 2004 and 2021, Apostles commissioned church planters or church revitalizers in Bellevue, Washington; Woodstock, Georgia; Houston, Texas; Wilmore, Kentucky; Lynn Haven, Florida; and Lexington, South Carolina. Apostles also hosts a two-year Simeon Fellowship to provide training and support for new pastors.
