= Terrell Glenn (attorney) =

American lawyer (1930–1993)

Terrell L. Glenn Sr.

United States Attorney for the Eastern District of South Carolina
- In office September 18, 1961 – January 31, 1968
- President: John F. Kennedy; Lyndon B. Johnson
- Preceded by: N. Welch Morrisette Jr.
- Succeeded by: Joseph O. Rogers Jr.

Personal details
- Born: June 3, 1930
- Died: April 24, 1993 (aged 62)
- Political party: Democratic
- Children: 4; including Terrell Jr.
- Parent: John Lyles Glenn Jr. (father)
- Education: University of South Carolina School of Law (J.D.)

Terrell Lyles Glenn Sr. (June 3, 1930 – April 24, 1993) was an American lawyer. He served as the United States attorney for the Eastern District of South Carolina from 1961 to 1968.

== Early life ==
Glenn was the younger son of John Lyles Glenn Jr., who served as a federal judge in South Carolina from 1929 until his death in 1938. He graduated from the University of South Carolina School of Law in 1953 and served as a U.S. Army judge advocate general after graduation.

== Legal career ==
In 1961, President John F. Kennedy named Glenn U.S. attorney for the Eastern District of South Carolina. At the time of his confirmation and commissioning in September 1961, Glenn was at age 31 the youngest U.S. attorney in the country.

Glenn continued as U.S. attorney under Lyndon B. Johnson and resigned in January 1968. He returned to private practice and later served as president of the South Carolina Bar and the Richland County Bar Association. Glenn and his father are the namesakes of the USC Law mock trial competition.

=== Support for integration ===
During his service as U.S. attorney and his later career in private practice, Glenn was recognized for his advocacy for and support of integration in South Carolina. For example, Glenn used his position in law enforcement to lean on movie theater owners in Columbia to desegregate over the objection of local officials. I. S. Leevy Johnson, the first black graduate of USC Law, described Glenn as "a major advocate of integration in South Carolina in his capacity as a former U. S. Attorney, and in his private life. Terrell Glenn and some others who are unknown were pushing to open up the positions at the South Carolina Bar." (Leevy Johnson later became the first black president of the South Carolina Bar Association.)

Attorney General Robert F. Kennedy stayed overnight in Glenn's home when he made a controversial visit to South Carolina in April 1963 to advocate integration. “We must recognize, as responsible citizens and as responsible government officials, that the Negroes in this country cannot be expected indefinitely to tolerate the injustices which flow from official and private racial discrimination in the United States,” Kennedy said during his visit.

== Personal life ==
Glenn was married to Louise Owens, the daughter of Columbia mayor Frank Owens. They were active and lifelong members of Trinity Episcopal Cathedral. The Glenns had four children; their son Terrell L. Glenn Jr. became an Episcopal priest and eventually a bishop in the Anglican Church in North America. The Glenns were patrons of the arts and Glenn received the 1976 Elizabeth O'Neill Verner Award for support of the arts.

Terrell Glenn Sr. died in Columbia on April 24, 1993.
