= Diocese of the Carolinas =

Anglican diocese in the United States

Location
- Ecclesiastical province: Anglican Church in North America

Statistics
- Parishes: 36 (2025)
- Members: 9,068 (2025)

Information
- Rite: Anglican
- Cathedral: Cathedral Church of the Apostles, Columbia, South Carolina

Current leadership
- Bishop: Steve Wood (inhibited since November 2025)
- Suffragan: David Bryan (acting bishop since November 2025)
- Auxiliary Bishops: Thad Barnum, Terrell Glenn (assisting)

Website
- dioceseofthecarolinas.com

The Diocese of the Carolinas is a diocese of the Anglican Church in North America, comprising 42 parishes in the American states of North Carolina, South Carolina, Tennessee and Kentucky. Its first bishop is Steve Wood. Wood is also the archbisop of the Anglican Church of North America and rector of St. Andrew's Church, in Mount Pleasant, South Carolina. David C. Bryan was elected Suffragan Bishop in June 2016, with Terrell Glenn and Thaddeus R. Barnum as Assisting Bishop.

== History ==
The diocese was formed when Anglican clergy and lay people, many of whom had left the Episcopal Church, began to gather to discuss starting a new diocese in the Anglican Church in North America. Chief among the architects of new diocese were Filmore Strunk, rector of All Saints' Church in Charlotte, North Carolina, and Steve Wood, rector of St. Andrew's Church in Mt. Pleasant, South Carolina.

The new diocese was approved unanimously at the Provincial Assembly of the ACNA, on 6 June 2012, with Steve Wood as their first bishop elected. He was consecrated on 25 August 2012, at St. Andrew's Church in Mount Pleasant, by Archbishop Robert Duncan, Archbishop-elect of Uganda, Stanley Ntagali, Bishop Roger Ames, Bishop John Guernsey and Bishop Alphonsa Gadsden, all three from the ACNA.

Bishop Wood, was elected on June 22, 2024, by the ACNA college of bishops to succeed Foley Beach as the province's third archbishop. He took office on June 28, at the conclusion of the ACNA's provincial assembly.

== Parishes ==
As of 2025, the Diocese of the Carolinas had 36 parishes (up 6% from 2022), 9,068 members (down 7% from 2022) and average Sunday attendance of 6,945 (up 43% from 2022). Notable parishes in the diocese include:

Church	Image	City	Year founded	Year completed	Notes
All Saints Church		Pawleys Island, South Carolina	1739	1917	
St. Andrew's Church		Mount Pleasant, South Carolina	1835	1857	
Holy Trinity Anglican Church		Raleigh, North Carolina	2003	2015	
Church of the Apostles		Columbia, South Carolina	2004	1964	Diocesan cathedral
