= Terrell Glenn (bishop) =

American Anglican bishop (born 1958)

The Right Reverend Terrell L. Glenn Jr.
- Assisting Bishop, Anglican Diocese of the Carolinas
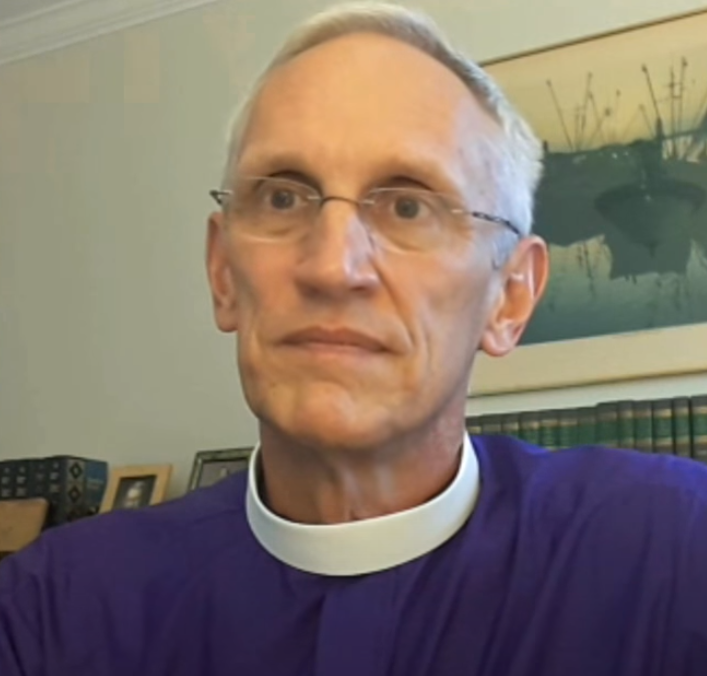
- Glenn interviewed on Anglican Unscripted
- Church: Anglican Church in North America
- Diocese: Carolinas
- Previous posts: Missionary Bishop, Anglican Mission in America

Orders
- Ordination: 1993 (diaconate); 1994 (priesthood)
- Consecration: January 26, 2008 by Emmanuel Kolini

Personal details
- Born: 1958 (age 66–67) Columbia, South Carolina
- Spouse: Teresa deBorde Glenn

Terrell Lyles Glenn Jr. (born 1958) is an American bishop of the Anglican Church in North America. He is a former Episcopal priest who played an active role in the Anglican realignment in the United States. Consecrated in 2008 to serve as a bishop in the Anglican Mission in the Americas, Glenn is now an assisting bishop overseeing North Carolina congregations in the Diocese of the Carolinas.

== Early life, education, and early career ==
Glenn was born in Columbia, South Carolina, to Terrell L. Glenn Sr., a former U.S. attorney, and Louise Owens Glenn. His paternal grandfather, John Lyles Glenn Jr., was a federal judge, and his maternal grandfather, Frank Owens, was a former mayor of Columbia. The Glenn family were active (though not, according to Terrell Jr., particularly devout) members of Trinity Episcopal Cathedral in Columbia. Terrell Jr. described his family's faith as "good churchmanship equaled good citizenship."

Terrell Jr. attended St. Andrew's School in Delaware. One summer during high school, he had a conversion experience while participating in the youth group at home at Trinity Cathedral, led by the Rev. John Yates Jr., the future longtime rector of The Falls Church Anglican. He and a group of fellow students sought to hold evangelistic chapel services once the school year began at St. Andrew's, but Glenn has said that the administration stopped the services after two were held.

Glenn attended the University of South Carolina and during this time was discipled by a Presbyterian minister in Columbia who educated him on Reformed theology. At the end of college, Glenn was approved for seminary studies by the Episcopal Diocese of Upper South Carolina and enrolled at Virginia Theological Seminary. He recalled that his first systematic theology professor began the class by disputing the physical resurrection of Jesus. Despite VTS' reputation as a bastion of low-church evangelical Episcopalianism, by the 1980s, Glenn said "it became clear to me that evangelicalism was tolerated and evangelicals were marginalized."

Glenn married Teresa deBorde; they had three children. After his ordination, Glenn served at a small rural parish in South Carolina, then as assistant rector at St. Philip's Episcopal Church in Charleston for six years. In 1990, he was called as rector of St. Andrew's Episcopal Church in Mount Pleasant, South Carolina.

== Anglican realignment ==
Glenn was a deputy to the 1994 and 1997 General Conventions of the Episcopal Church and was troubled by a resolution in 1997 that removed the "conscience clause" regarding women's ordination; dioceses were no longer permitted their own choice on whether to ordain women to the priesthood. "Regardless of one's view of women's ordination, we were now on slippery slope of mandating behavior that had neither been thoroughly studied theologically nor considered extensively with our ecumenical partners," Glenn recalled. "The 1997 Convention also failed to uphold and require a biblical sexual ethic for the church's clergy and people. For me, it was the writing on the wall. . . . [I] realized that the real divide in TEC was not over women's ordination or human sexuality but over the Bible and its interpretation."

In September 1997, Glenn joined a group of 26 conservative or traditionalist Episcopal priests—including Chuck Murphy, T. J. Johnston, and Jeffrey Steenson―in signing what became called the "First Promise" statement. The statement—drafted at Murphy's church, All Saints Episcopal Church in Pawleys Island, South Carolina—declared the authority of the Episcopal Church and its General Convention to be "fundamentally impaired" because they no longer upheld the "truth of the gospel." Glenn and the statement's other signers also stated their intention to be aligned with Anglican Communion members whose theological principles aligned with the First Promise statement.

After the controversy over Resolution 1.10 at the 1998 Lambeth Conference—at which Anglican bishops by a vote of 389 to 190 passed an amendment stating that "homosexual practice" is "incompatible with Scripture" and that the conference "cannot advise the legitimising or blessing of same sex unions nor ordaining those involved in same gender unions"—Glenn recalled that Global South Anglican primates became aware of the theological progressivism in the Episcopal Church and Anglican Church of Canada. In 2000, the First Promise statement evolved into the Anglican Mission in America. Murphy and former Trinity School for Ministry dean John Rodgers were made bishops by Emmanuel Kolini and Moses Tay. They left the Episcopal Church and founded the AMIA with canonical residence in the Anglican Church of Rwanda—the first significant exodus from TEC since the Congress of St. Louis in 1977.

Glenn stepped down from St. Andrew's Mount Pleasant in 1999. He renounced his ordination in the Episcopal Church in February 2000 and later that year was received as a presbyter by the Anglican Church of Rwanda. That year, he became the founding rector of Church of the Apostles in Raleigh, North Carolina, under the auspices of the newly formed AMIA. Apostles grew to 375 in average attendance and a $1 million annual budget under Glenn. In 2005, Glenn was called as rector of All Saints, Pawleys Island, succeeding future bishop David Bryan as senior pastor. (After All Saints in 2004 changed its articles of incorporation to remove references to the Episcopal Church, the church was involved in a landmark case related to property ownership of Episcopal churches in South Carolina. The state Supreme Court ruled in 2009 that the parish, which predated the Episcopal Church, was the owner of its property regardless of the Dennis Canon.)

== Episcopacy and transition to ACNA ==
In 2007, the Rwandan bishops elected Glenn to serve as a missionary bishop in the AMIA. He was consecrated in January 2008 by Kolini alongside John Miller and Philip Jones. Glenn oversaw a network of 54 churches while remaining rector of All Saints Pawleys, as was customary for AMIA bishops. Glenn resigned as rector of All Saints in November 2010, during a period of growing tension between AMIA leadership and both the newly formed Anglican Church in North America and the Anglican Church in Rwanda. In 2010, AMIA—which had been a founding member of the ACNA the year before—left full membership, changing its status in ACNA to "ministry partner." By the next year, the relationship between AMIA chairman Murphy and the Anglican Church of Rwanda's house of bishops, led by Kolini's successor Onesphore Rwaje, had broken down over questions of financial transparency and collegiality. Except for Glenn and Thad Barnum, the AMIA bishops removed AMIA from Rwandan jurisdiction and restructured it as a "missionary society." "What followed was a season of enmity, demonization, and slander," Glenn recalled. "In one case, bishops turned on congregations and clergy in ways that were worse than anything that had occurred at the hands of TEC when AMIA was formed in the first place. It was the single most painful experience that I have ever had in ministry."v

In early 2012, a majority of AMIA congregations elected to remain canonically in the Rwandan church and pursue full membership and "dual citizenship" in the ACNA, forming PEARUSA. Barnum and Glenn were given temporary responsibility for PEARUSA congregations pending the election and consecration of new bishops. After new bishops were elected for PEARUSA, Glenn moved to Houston to plant the Church of the Apostles in the newly forming ACNA Diocese of the Western Gulf Coast.

In 2017, Glenn returned to St. Andrew's to serve as campus pastor for its Charleston city location under Steve Wood, rector of St. Andrew's and diocesan bishop of the Carolinas. In 2020, Glenn returned to Raleigh to serve as area bishop for North Carolina congregations in the Diocese of the Carolinas. That year, the Church of the Apostles, which Glenn had planted in 2000, moved from the Anglican Diocese of Christ Our Hope to Glenn's jurisdiction in the Diocese of the Carolinas. He also served as dean for College of Bishops affairs in the ACNA.
