= All Saints Church (Pawleys Island, South Carolina) =

Historic church in South Carolina, United States

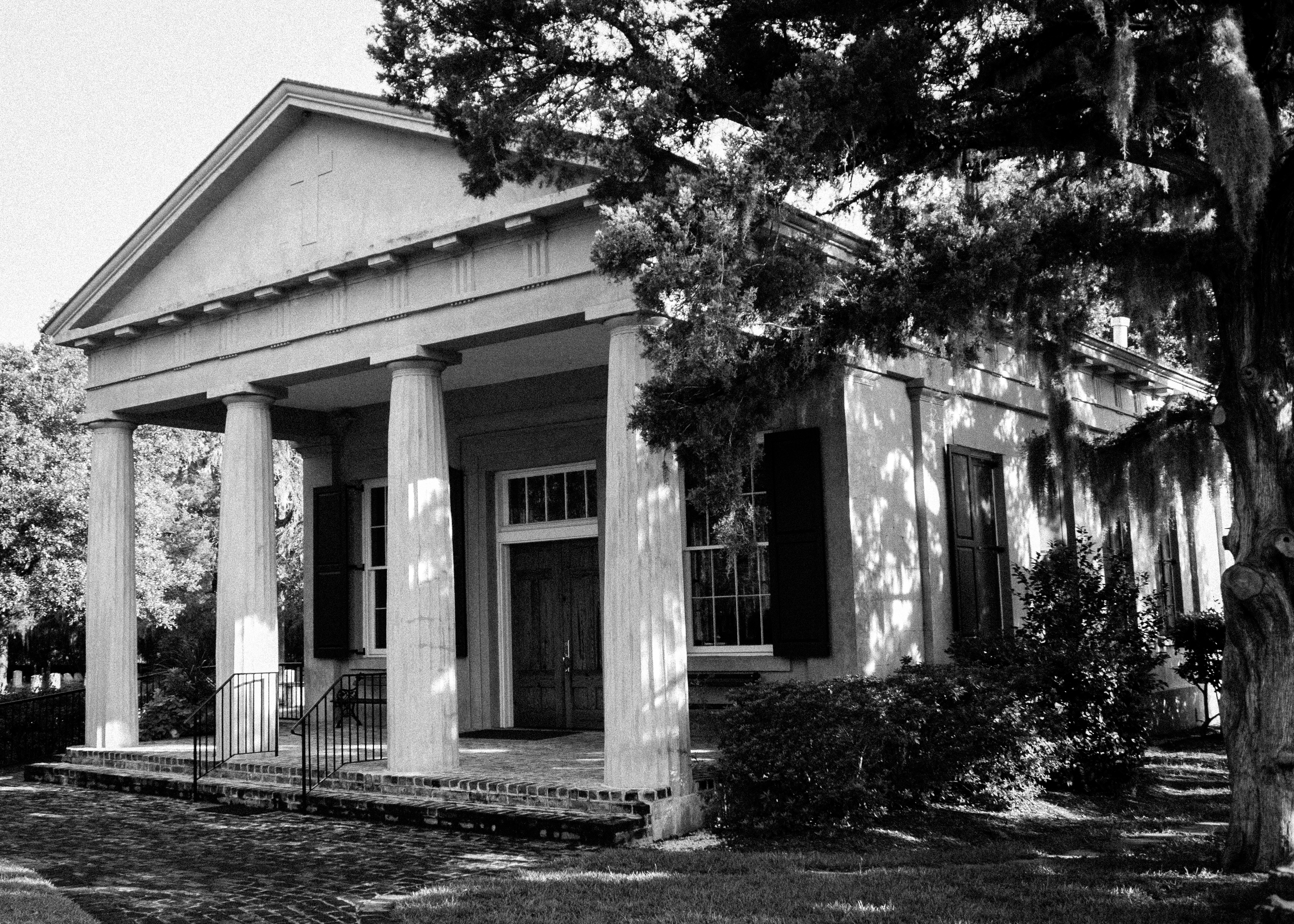
- All Saints Church
- Location: Pawleys Island, South Carolina
- Country: United States
- Denomination: Anglican Church in North America
- Website: www.allsaintspawleys.org

History
- Founded: 1739

Architecture
- Years built: 1916–1917

Administration
- Diocese: Carolinas

Clergy
- Rector: The Rev. Rob Grafe
- All Saints Episcopal Church, Waccamaw
- U.S. National Register of Historic Places
- U.S. Historic district
- Location within South Carolina Location within the United States
- Nearest city: Pawleys Island, South Carolina
- Coordinates: 33°28′3″N 79°8′24″W
- Area: 5.5 acres (2.2 ha)
- Built: 1916
- Architect: R. L. Gravely
- Architectural style: Classical Revival
- NRHP reference No.: 91000232
- Added to NRHP: March 13, 1991

All Saints Church Pawleys Island is a historic church complex and national historic district located in Pawleys Island, Georgetown County, South Carolina. The district encompasses three contributing buildings and one contributing site—the sanctuary, cemetery, rectory, and chapel. In 2004, it left the Episcopal Church to join the Diocese of the Carolinas, now part of the Anglican Church in North America, a denomination within the Anglican realignment movement.

The sanctuary, built 1916–1917, the fourth to serve this congregation, is significant as an excellent example of the Classical Revival style, adapting the design of the church's 19th century sanctuary which burned in 1915. It is a one-story rectangular brick building sheathed in scored stucco. It has an engaged pedimented portico supported by four fluted Greek Doric order columns. A Doric frieze, composed of triglyphs, metopes, and guttae, runs under the cornice around the building on three sides. The church has a large center aisle sanctuary with a coved tray ceiling. The church cemetery, established in the 1820s, is significant for the persons buried there, many of whom were the leading public figures of antebellum Georgetown County. It is also significant a collection of outstanding gravestone art from about 1820 to 1900. The church rectory, built in 1822, is an intact example of a Carolina I-house. Its first congregation was formed in 1739, and the church has been located at this site since then. Associated with the church is the separately listed Cedar Grove Plantation Chapel.

It was added to the National Register of Historic Places in 1991.
