= List of international river borders =

This is a List of international river borders. Rivers that form any portion of the border between two countries minimum:

== By region ==
=== Africa ===
Countries in Africa

River	Bordering countries
Akanyaru River	Rwanda/Burundi
Akagera River	Rwanda/Tanzania
Bahr al-Arab	Sudan/South Sudan
Caledon River	Lesotho/South Africa
Chari River	Cameroon/Chad
Chobe River	Namibia/Botswana
Congo River	Democratic Republic of Congo/Republic of Congo
Donga River	Nigeria/Cameroon
Kagitumba river	Rwanda, Uganda and Tanzania
Kasai River	Democratic Republic of Congo/Angola
Kwango River	Democratic Republic of Congo/Angola
Kunene River	Namibia/Angola
Limpopo River	South Africa/Botswana
Limpopo River	South Africa/Zimbabwe
Luapula River	Democratic Republic of Congo/Zambia
Niger River	Benin/Niger
Okavango River	Namibia/Angola
Orange River	Namibia/South Africa
Rusizi River	Burundi/Democratic Republic of the Congo
Rusizi River	Rwanda/Democratic Republic of the Congo
Senegal River	Senegal/Mauritania
Sio-Malaba-Malakisi River	Uganda/Kenya
Ubangi River	Central African Republic/Democratic Republic of the Congo
Mbomou River	Central African Republic/Democratic Republic of the Congo
White Nile	Sudan/South Sudan
Yobe River	Niger/Nigeria
Zambezi River	Botswana/Zambia
Zambezi River	Namibia/Zambia
Zambezi River	Zimbabwe/Zambia

=== North America ===
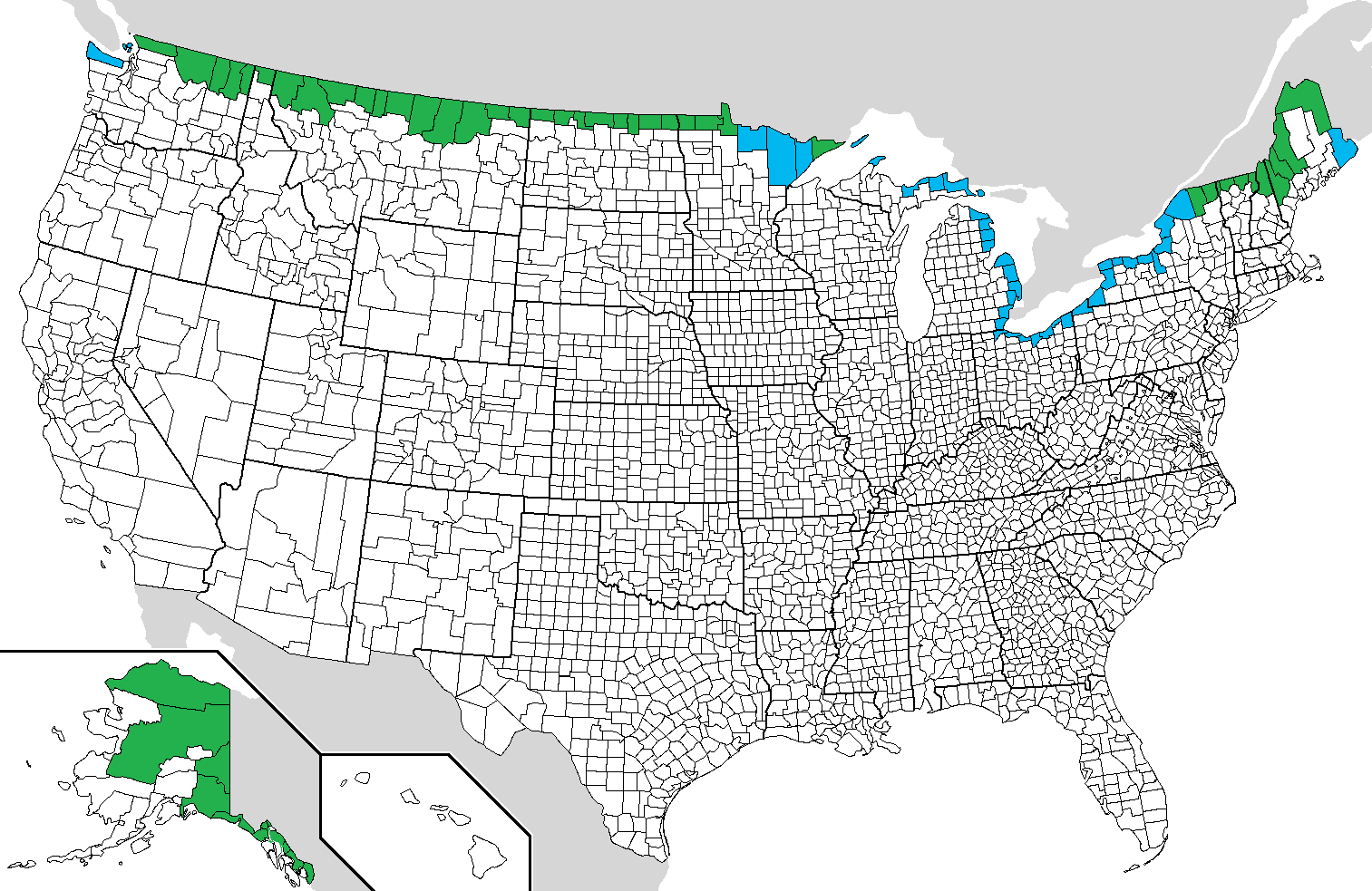
U.S. counties (or county equivalents) sharing a land or water border with Canada Land border Water border only

River	State/Province	Bordering country
Rio Grande	Texas/ Chihuahua,Coahuila,Nuevo León,Tamaulipas	United States /Mexico
Colorado River	Colorado, Utah,Arizona ,Nevada,California /Baja California,Sonora	United States /Mexico
Detroit River	Michigan / Ontario	United States /Canada
Halls Stream	Quebec/ New Hampshire/Vermont	United States /Canada
Niagara River	New York / Ontario	United States /Canada
Pine River	Minnesota / Ontario	United States /Canada
Pigeon River	Minnesota / Ontario	United States /Canada
Rainy River	Minnesota / Ontario	United States /Canada
St. Clair River	Michigan / Ontario	United States /Canada
St. Croix River	Maine / New Brunswick	United States /Canada
St. Francis River	Maine / New Brunswick, Quebec	United States /Canada
Saint John River	Maine / New Brunswick, Quebec	United States /Canada
St. Lawrence River	New York / Ontario	United States /Canada
St. Marys River	Michigan / Ontario	United States /Canada
Hondo River (Belize)		Mexico/Belize
Suchiate River		Mexico/Guatemala
Usumacinta River		Mexico/Guatemala
Coco River		Nicaragua/Honduras
Paz River		Guatemala/El Salvador
Motagua River		Guatemala/Honduras
San Juan River		Nicaragua/Costa Rica
Sarstoon River		Guatemala/Belize
Sixaola River		Costa Rica/Panama
Sumpul River		El Salvador/Honduras
Guasaule River		El Salvador/Honduras
Artibonite River		Dominican Republic/Haiti

=== South America ===
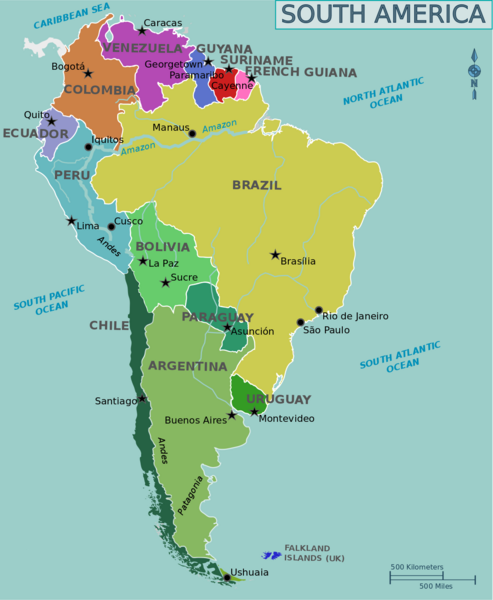
Map of South America

River	Bordering country
Amazon River	Colombia, Peru/Brazil
Apaporis River	Colombia/Brazil
Arauca River	Colombia/Venezuela
Bermejo River	Argentina/Bolivia
Catatumbo River	Colombia/Venezuela
Courantyne River	Guyana/Suriname
Cuareim River	Brazil/Uruguay
Guaitara River	Colombia/Ecuador
Iguazu River	Argentina/Brazil
Maroni River	French Guiana/Suriname
Mataje River	Colombia/Ecuador
Meta River	Colombia/Ecuador
Mira River	Colombia/Ecuador
Negro River	Colombia/Ecuador
Oiapoque River	Brazil/French Guiana
Orinoco River	Colombia/Venezuela
Paraguay River	Argentina/Paraguay
Paraguay River	Brazil/Paraguay
Paraná River	Argentina/Paraguay
Paraná River	Brazil/Paraguay
Pilcomayo River	Argentina/Paraguay
Putumayo River	Colombia/Peru
Rapirrán River	Brazil/Bolivia
Rapirrán River	Brazil/Peru
Uruguay River	Argentina/Uruguay
Uruguay River	Brazil/Argentina
Vaupés River	Colombia/Brazil
Yaguaron River	Brazil/Uruguay
Zulia River	Colombia/Venezuela

=== Europe ===
Rivers that form borders between countries in Europe include:

River	Bordering country
Águeda	Spain/Portugal
Ardila River	Spain/Portugal
Bidasoa	France/Spain
Blies	France/Germany
Bug River	Belarus/Poland, Ukraine/Poland
Caia	Spain/Portugal
Chanza River	Spain/Portugal
Danube	Germany/Austria nearby Passau, Austria/Slovakia, Croatia/Serbia, Hungary/Slovakia, Romania/Bulgaria, Romania/Ukraine, Serbia/Romania
Daugava River	Latvia/Belarus
Derkul	Ukraine/Russia
Dnieper	Belarus/Ukraine
Dniester	Ukraine/Moldova
Douro	Portugal/Spain
Drava	Croatia/Hungary
Drina	Bosnia and Herzegovina/Serbia
Elbe	Czech Republic/Germany
Flöha	Czech Republic/Germany
Foyle	Republic of Ireland/United Kingdom (Northern Ireland)
Guadiana	Portugal/Spain
Inn	Austria/Germany
Grense Jakobselv	Norway/Russia
Kirnitzsch	Czech Republic/Germany
Kolpa	Croatia/Slovenia
Lauter	Germany/France
Lusatian Neisse	Germany/Poland
Lys	Belgium/France
Malše	Austria/Czech Republic
Maritsa (Evros/Meriç)	Greece/Turkey
Meuse	Belgium/The Netherlands
Minho	Portugal/Spain
Morava	Austria/Slovakia, Czech Republic/Slovakia
Moselle	Germany/Luxembourg
Mura	Croatia/Slovenia
Narva	Estonia/Russia
Neman River	Belarus/Lithuania, Russia (Kaliningrad) and Lithuania
Niers	Germany/The Netherlands
Oder	Germany/Poland
Paatsjoki (Pasvikelva)	Norway/Russia
Prut	Romania/Moldova, Ukraine/Romania
Rezovo	Bulgaria/Turkey
Rhine	Germany/France, Germany/Switzerland, Germany/The Netherlands, Switzerland/Liechtenstein
Sava	Bosnia and Herzegovina/Croatia, Croatia/Serbia
Seversky Donets	Ukraine/Russia
Sozh	Belarus/Ukraine
Tana River (Norway)	Finland/Norway
Termon	Ireland/United Kingdom of Great Britain and Northern Ireland
Thaya	Austria/Czech Republic
Tisza	Romania/Ukraine, Ukraine/Hungary
Torne	Sweden/Finland
Vadakste	Latvia/Lithuania

=== Asia ===
River	Bordering country
Amur River	China/Russia
Ussuri River	China/Russia
Argun River	China/Russia
Granitnaya River	China/Russia
Brahmaputra River	India, Bangladesh/China
Chu River	Kazakhstan/Kyrgyzstan
Fly River	Indonesia/Papua New Guinea
Ganges River	India/Bangladesh
Golok River	Malaysia/Thailand
Hirmand River	Iran/Afghanistan
Amu River	Uzbekistan/Afghanistan
Indus River	China, India/Pakistan
Kaladan River	India/Myanmar
Mahakali River	India/Nepal
Mechi River	Nepal/India
Mekong River	Myanmar/Laos, Laos/Thailand
Kraburi River	Myanmar/Thailand
Salween River	Myanmar/China
Salween River	Myanmar/Thailand
Naf River	Bangladesh/Myanmar
Pandaruan River	Malaysia/Brunei
Tumen River	North Korea, China, and Russia
Yalu River	North Korea/China
Beilun River	Vietnam/China
Tigris River	Turkey Syria Iran/Iraq
Euphrates River	Turkey Syria Iran/Iraq
Akhurian River	Armenia/Turkey
Aras River	Azerbaijan, Turkey, Iran/Armenia
Hezil Suyu	Iraq/Turkey
Jordan River	Israel/Jordan
Jordan River	State of Palestine/Jordan
Khabur (Tigris)	Iraq/Turkey
Shatt al-Arab or Arvand rud	Iraq/Iran
Wadi al Batin	Iraq/Kuwait

== See also ==
- Transboundary river
