= Manasseh Gahima =

Rwandan Anglican bishop (born 1970)

The Most Reverend Manasseh Gahima
- Primate of the Anglican Church of Rwanda; Bishop of Gasabo
- Church: Anglican Church of Rwanda
- Diocese: Gasabo
- In office: Since 2026
- Predecessor: Laurent Mbanda
- Previous post: Bishop of Gahini (2019–26)

Orders
- Consecration: 28 May 2017 by Onesphore Rwaje

Personal details
- Born: December 12, 1970 (age 55)
- Denomination: Anglican
- Spouse: Rose Dusenge
- Children: 8
- Education: Institute of Teacher Education Kyambogo (diploma); Umutara Polytechnic (BC); Kabale University (MA); Wycliffe University (MTh, PhD)

Manasseh Gahima (born December 12, 1970) is a Rwandan Anglican bishop. Since October 2026, he has been primate of the Anglican Church of Rwanda. He was previously bishop of the Diocese of Gahini from 2019 to 2026.

== Early life, education and career ==
Gahima was born in 1970. When he was a child, his family fled Rwanda as refugees, and Gahima grew up in neighbouring Uganda. He received a diploma in teaching from the Institute of Teacher Education Kyambogo in Uganda, a bachelor of commerce from Umutara Polytechnic, a master's degree in human resource management from Kabale University, and a master's in theology and a PhD in theological studies from Wycliffe University in Kampala.

In the 1990s, Gahima was deputy headmaster overseeing Anglophone education at Lycée de Kigali. He later worked in local government, serving as bourgmestre of Karangazi Commune (now part of Nyagatare District) starting in 1997 and from 2004 to 2005 as bourgmestre of the former Gabiro Commune.

== Ordained ministry ==
Gahima began parish ministry in 2005 and later held administrative positions in the Diocese of Gahini. In 2017, Gahima was made a bishop and appointed assistant bishop in the Diocese of Gahini. He was elected and installed as the second diocesan bishop of Gahini in May 2019. As a bishop, he was active in the Global Anglican Communion and gave plenary addresses at GAFCON events in Plano, Texas, US, in 2025 and Abuja, Nigeria, in 2026. He was also president of Rwanda's Council of Protestant Churches.

In September 2026, Gahima was elected archbishop of Rwanda and bishop of Gasabo. He succeeded Laurent Mbanda as archbishop on 25 October at a ceremony in Kigali attended by Prime Minister Justin Nsengiyumva.

== Personal life ==
Gahima is married to Rose Dusenge Gahima. They have eight children.

Anglican Communion titles
Preceded by Alexis Bilindibagabo	Bishop of Gahini; 2019–2026	Succeeded by Vacant
Preceded by Laurent Mbanda	Primate of the Anglican Church of Rwanda; Bishop of Gasabo; Since 2026	Incumbent
