= Muvumba river =

Muvumba River

Location
- Country: Rwanda, Uganda

Physical characteristics
- Source
  - coordinates: 1°07′54″S 30°20′38″E
  - elevation: 1,906 m (6,253 ft)
- Mouth
  - coordinates: 1°03′26″S 30°28′22″E
  - elevation: 1,274 m (4,180 ft)
- Length: 170 km (110 mi)
- Basin size: 3500 sq km
- Discharge
  - average: 16.6 cubic m/s

Basin features
- River system: Akagera River
- Tributaries
  - left: Mutojo, Cyinzinga
  - right: Karungeri, Cyenkwanzi

Muvumba is a river in northeastern of Rwanda and southwestern Uganda. It is part of the upper headwaters of the Nile. At 170 km long, it is one of the major rivers of Rwanda both in size and economic importance. Its upper course provides water for tea plantations in the high altitudes of north Rwanda and southwestern Uganda. Its lower course provides water for the dry areas of Nyagatare, facilitating irrigation of rice fields and other crops as well as providing water for cattle in this area for cattle farming.

== Course ==
The river takes its source at Rukomo in Gicumbi district close to the town of Byumba in the high mountains of northern Rwanda. At the source, it is called the Mulindi River. This stream is very important to the economy as its valley and the valleys of its tributaries are fertile and contain major tea plantations. One of the largest tea factories in Rwanda, the Mulindi Factory is located on this river. The Mulindi flows north for 28 km and then enters Uganda.

Upon entering Uganda, the river changes its name from Mulindi River to Rwabakazi River. Rwabakazi continues northward, then upon reaching the city of Kabale, the river changes its course and flows in a general southeast direction towards Rwanda. This section of the Muvumba River in Uganda (Rwabakazi River) is 55 km long. The river reenters Rwanda in Nyagatare District and takes the name Muvumba River. It then flows in the northeastern direction for 87km and empties into the Akagera River at Kagitumba, the tri-point between Rwanda, Uganda and Tanzania. For the last 30 km of its course, the river forms the border between Rwanda and Uganda.

== Economy ==
The Muvumba River valley is heavily farmed. The upper course of the river in the mountains of the Northern Province in Rwanda and Kabale District in Uganda has narrow valleys that are mainly used as tea plantations. The river provides water to countless canals that serve to irrigate the plantations. As a result, the river is partially dammed in many location to control water levels and ensure the availability of water even in the dry seasons. In areas where there are no tea plantations, the valley is used for subsistence farming. Upon re-entering Rwanda, the river flows in areas of hills with gentler slopes and relatively lower altitude. The entire course of the Muvumba river valley is prone to flash flooding due to the heavy rains that fall in the mountains of its upper reaches. These have been known to bring heavy floods even in the lower parts of the river that normally do not get as much rain. These floods can often paralyze the lower course of the river, closing off roads and bridges while also causing extensive damage to crops.

== Fauna and Flora ==
Outside of extensive farming, the wild lower reaches of the river support a sizable gallery forest. This narrow forest can be thick and almost impenetrable, and contains many varieties of savanna trees. Many bird species are found in this area, the most abundant of which are herons and egrets. Small aquatic mammals and reptiles can be found. Larger water animals such as hippopotamuses and Nile crocodiles can also be found in areas close to the confluence with the much larger Akagera River. These animals have been known to travel further upstream, especially during flooding causing casualties to the unsuspecting locals who are not used to these animals being that far upstream.
