= Kagitumba river =

Kagitumba River

Location
- Country: Rwanda, Uganda

Physical characteristics
- Source
  - coordinates: 1°07′54″S 30°20′38″E
  - elevation: 1,330 m (4,360 ft)
- Mouth
  - coordinates: 1°03′26″S 30°28′22″E
  - elevation: 1,274 m (4,180 ft)
- Length: 39 km (24 mi)
- Basin size: 3500 sq km
- Discharge
  - average: 16.6 cubic m/s

Basin features
- River system: Akagera River

The Kagitumba is a river on the border of Rwanda and Uganda part of the upper headwaters of the Nile. Kagitumba is the name taken by the Muvumba river for its last stretch before it empties in the Akagera River. The river is only 39 km (24 miles) and is located on the North Eastern extremity of Rwanda. For its entire length, it forms the border of Rwanda and Uganda. Despite its short length, this is one of the major rivers of Rwanda. Its drainage basin covers 3500 km^{2} and spans parts of Gicumbi, Gatsibo and Nyagatare District Districts in Rwanda, and Kabale and Ntungamo Districts in Uganda.

== Course ==
Kagitumba is the name taken by the Muvumba River at is confluence with Cyinzinga. Some sources as well as locals still consider this river to still be the Muvumba. The Kagitumba initially flows northward for 14 km before making 90 degrees turn east for the remaining 25 km. Kagitumba river form the last stretch of the border between Rwanda and Uganda. The river empties in the Akagera River forming a tri-point border between Rwanda, Uganda and Tanzania close to the towns of Kagitumba in Rwanda and Mirama Hills in Uganda.
