= Anglican Diocese of Gahini =

Anglican diocese in Rwanda

Diocese of Gahini Diyosezi y'Abangilikani ya Gahini
- Seal of the Diocese of Gahini

Location
- Country: Rwanda
- Territory: Kayonza
- Archdeaconries: 6

Statistics
- Parishes: 59
- Churches: 280
- Members: 100,000

Information
- Rite: Anglican
- Cathedral: St. John's Cathedral
- Language: Kinyarwanda, French, English

Current leadership
- Bishop: Manasseh Gahima

Website
- gahinidiocese1936.org

The Anglican Diocese of Gahini is one of 13 dioceses in the Anglican Church of Rwanda. It was founded in 1997 and is headquartered in Gahini, Kayonza, one of the historic locations of the East African Revival.

== History ==
=== Association with East African Revival ===
Gahini is considered a historic site in Rwandan Christianity. It was there in 1925 that Geoffrey Holmes founded the Ruanda Mission under the auspices of the Anglican Church Mission Society. Herbert Jackson founded a hospital there the next year, work that John Edward "Joe" Church continued for many years.

In 1936, the church and mission center at Gahini was the location of what observers described as "a flood of confession and restitution" and the signs of charismatic renewal. In her history of the Ruanda Mission, Patricia St. John described:

The outward manifestations of revival became progressively more violent, and in the summer of 1936 many missionaries felt there was real cause for concern. One night, at the girls’ school, about six Christian girls went off to a classroom to pray and as they prayed, one after another joined them until neatly the whole school was present. A tremendous sense of sin gripped the company; three or four prayed at a time and many wept and cried out until they collapsed on the floor. Confessions were sobbed out far into the night, and the resumption of normal classes was impossible for days, as girl after girl asked leave to go home and pay debts or restore stolen property. In the church the same thing was happening. There was loud weeping, rolling on the floor and trembling, as men cried out their confession of sin, and their manifestations of joy when they experienced God’s forgiveness were equally alarming from the European point of view. Drums were beaten and men danced and swayed outside the church like pagans. So great was their relief that they sometimes went on singing hymns all night.

The revival that spread from Gahini was also characterized by the influence of African leaders like Simeon Nsibambi and Festo Kivengere. Converts in Gahini began sending evangelists into neighboring regions and countries, contributing to the spread of revival in Uganda, Burundi, Kenya, Boga Zaire and Tanganyika.

=== Formation and growth of the diocese ===
As the Anglican Church of Rwanda grew in the years after the genocide, the Diocese of Gahini was erected in 1997, with Alexis Bilindibagabo serving as its first bishop. The diocese embraces its role as a pilgrimage site for the East African Revival, restoring buildings at the Ruanda Mission site associated with the revival and erecting a new cathedral, St. John's Cathedral, dedicated to the history of the revival. The diocese is home to an annual revival convention and a modern hospital. In February 2017, Archbishop of Canterbury Justin Welby visited the Fellowship House in Gahini, where the 1936 revival is said to have broken out, and blessed the foundation stone for a yet-to-be-built East African Revival Heritage Centre.

In 2018, Manasseh Gahima succeeded Bilindabagabo as the second bishop of the Gahini diocese.

== Bishops ==
1. Alexis Bilindabagabo (1997–2018)
2. Manasseh Gahima (2018–present)

== Companion dioceses ==
- The Diocese of Gippsland in the Anglican Church of Australia
- The Diocese of Winchester in the Church of England
