= Umutara Polytechnic =

- Active: 2004–2011

Umutara Polytechnic (UP) was a higher education institution in Rwanda. Founded in 2004, was located in the city of Nyagatare, capital of Nyagatare district in Eastern Province, Rwanda.

UP started its first academic year on 2 May 2006 with 265 students and 16 staff. It was organized into faculties of Agriculture, Commerce and Applied Economics, Information and Communication Technology (ICT), and Veterinary Science. On 28 August 2008, Umutara Polytechnic was declared as a public institution of higher learning by a cabinet meeting chaired by the President of the Republic of Rwanda.
