= East African Revival Museum =

Coordinates: 0°36′45.4183″N 30°37′53.0854″E

Uganda Martyrs Museum
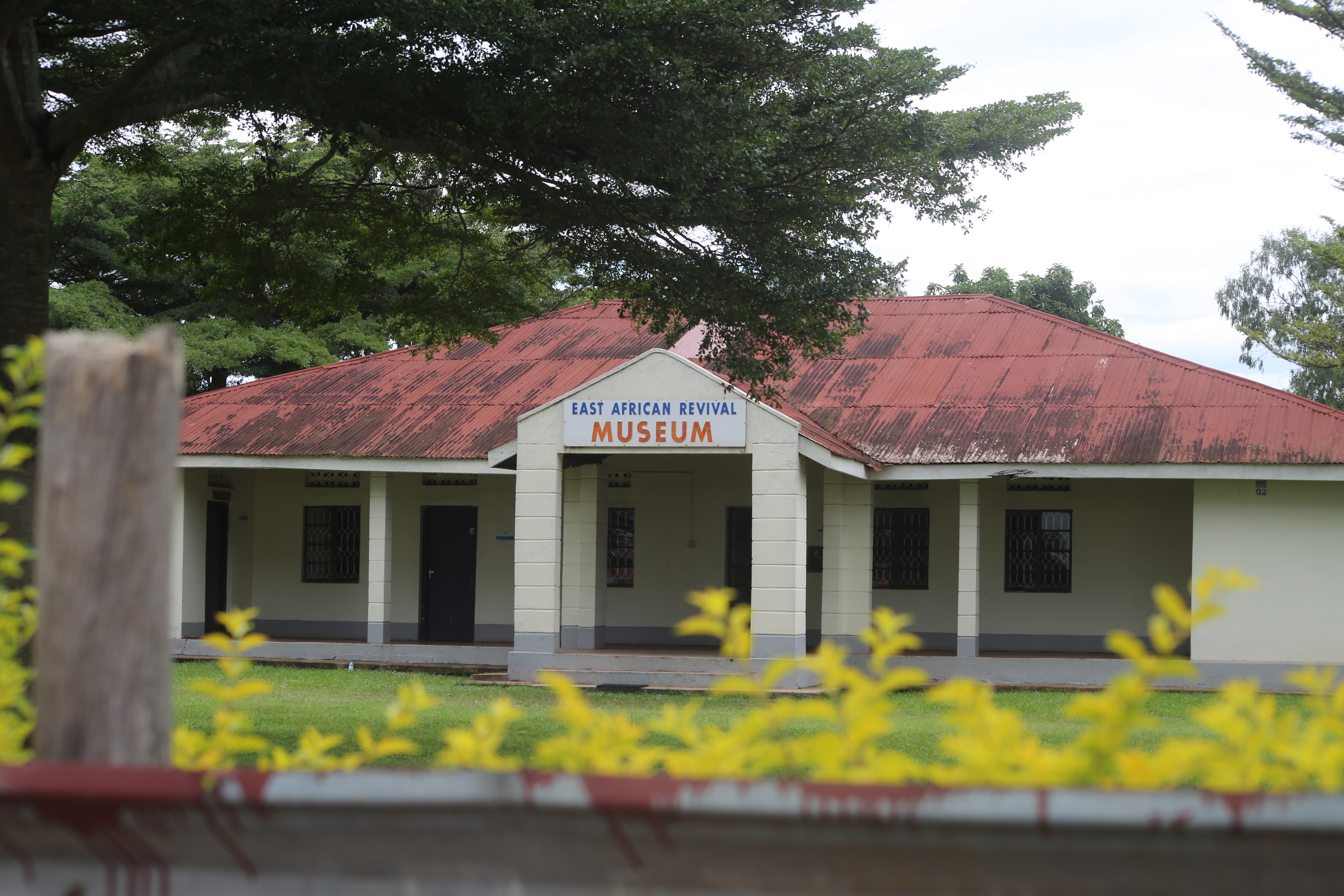

- Map of Uganda showing the location of East African Revival Museum
- Established: 2016
- Type: Historical

East African Revival Museum is a Ugandan museum located on Ruharo Hill in Mbarara City.

== History ==
East African Revival Museum is an institution established to preserve and document the historical legacy of the East African Revival, a significant Christian renewal movement that originated in the 1930s. The initiative for its creation came from individuals connected to the movement and ecclesiastical institutions, who recognized the need to systematically collect and protect its physical artifacts and oral histories. The Uganda Martyrs Seminary in Namugongo was selected as the site for this repository.

In 2016, the museum was opened to serve as the central archive for the movement, providing a factual and historical record of its development and impact across the region. The museum operates as an educational resource, focusing on the movement's role within the broader social and religious context of 20th-century East Africa.

== Galleries ==
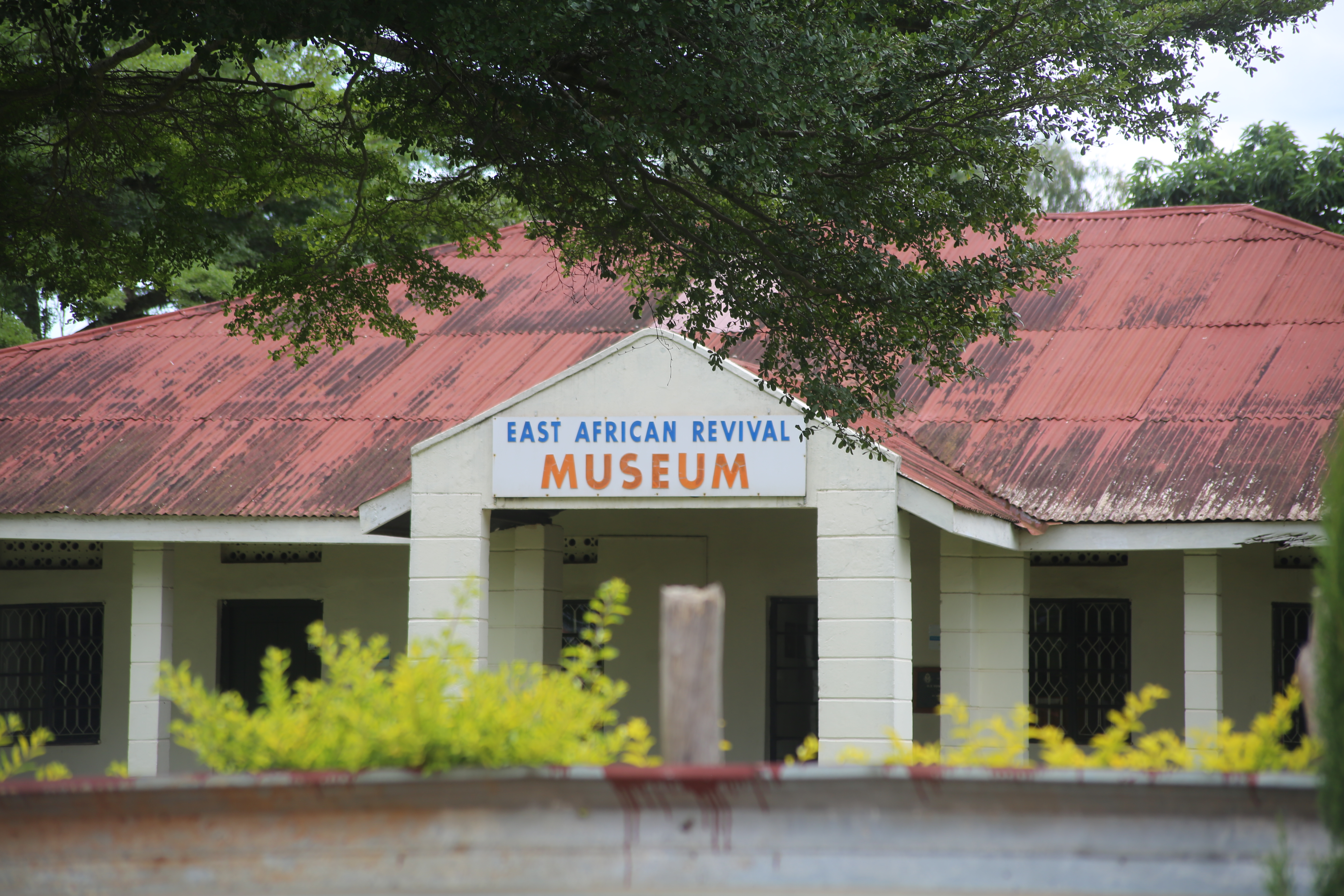

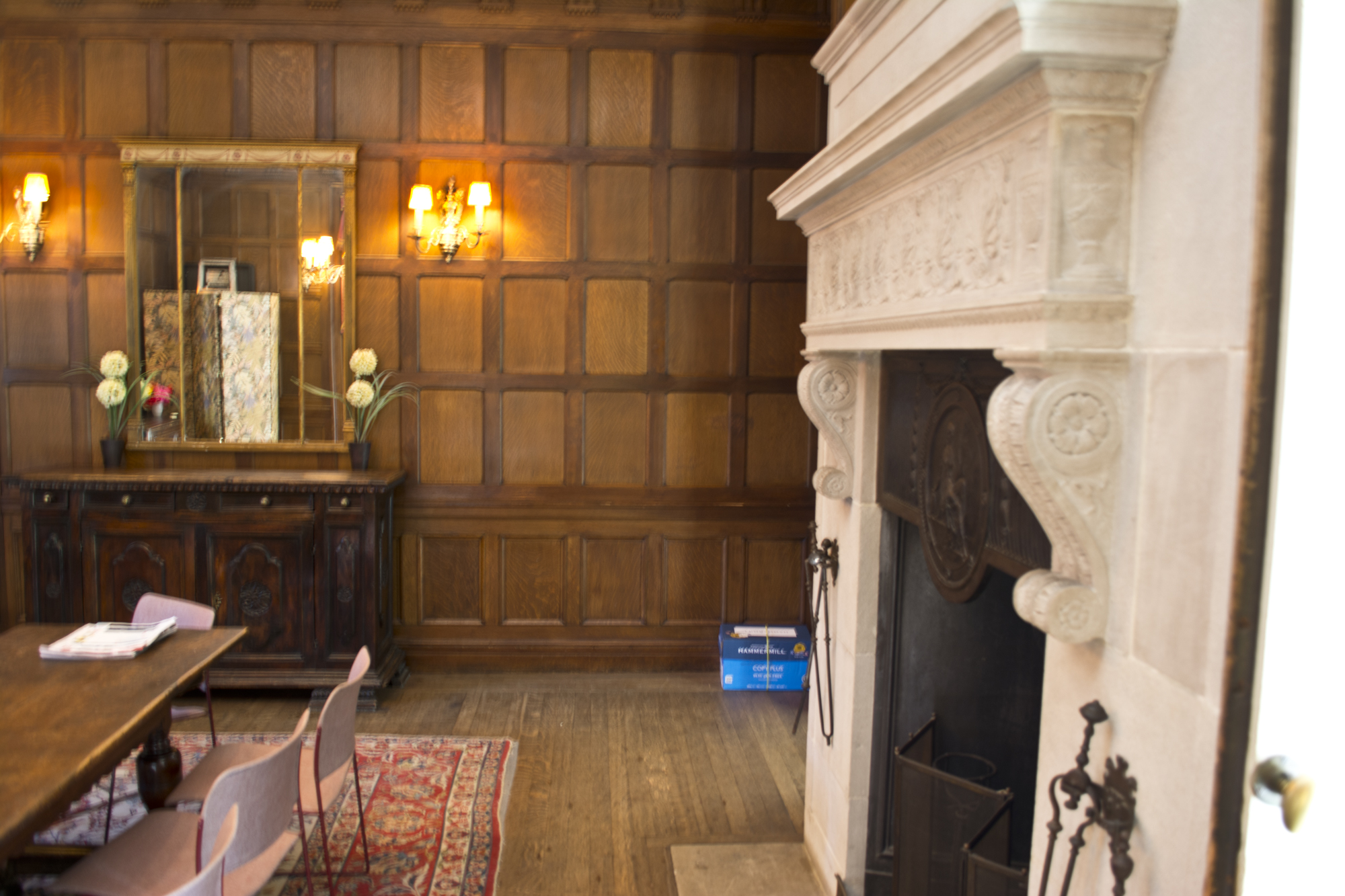

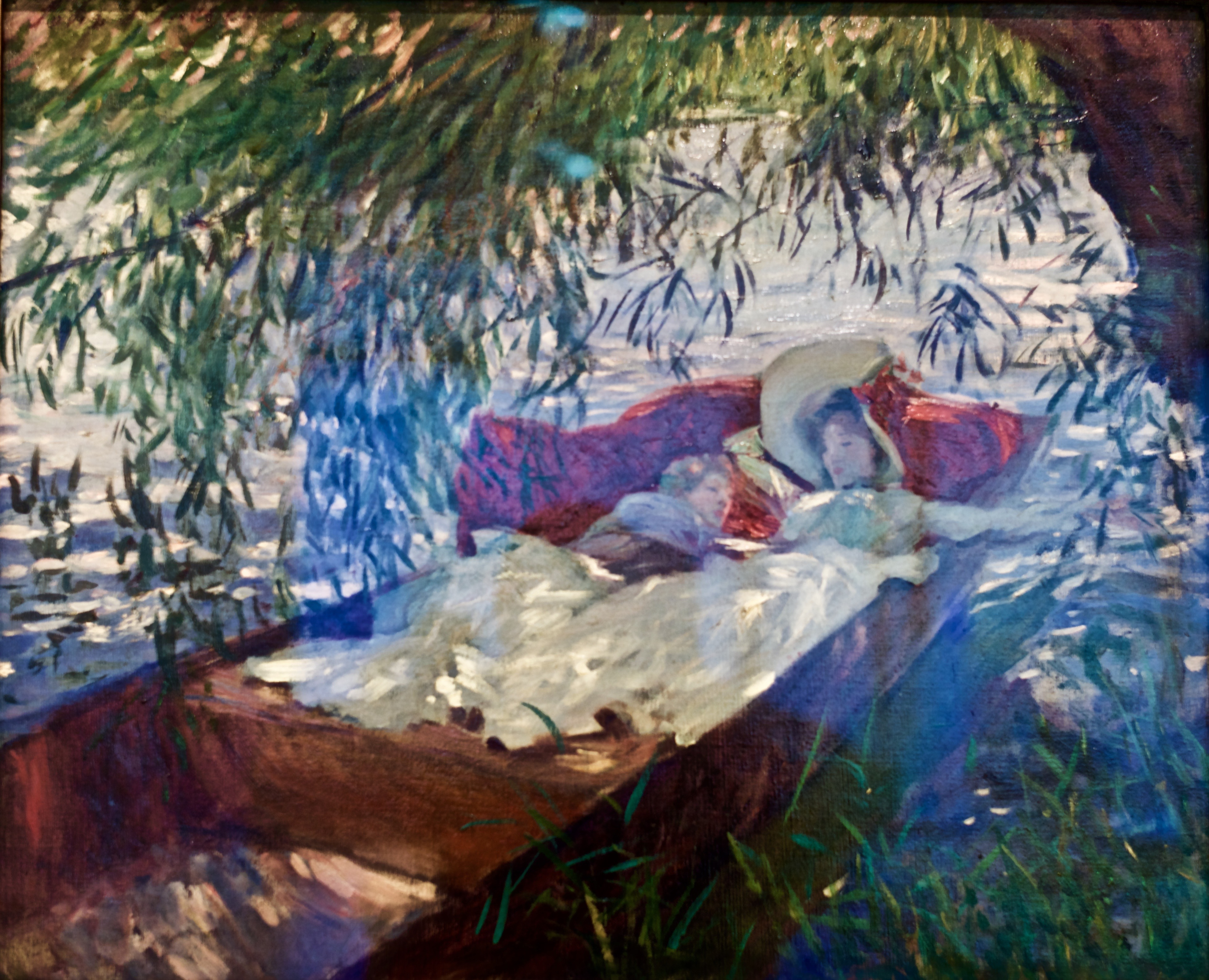

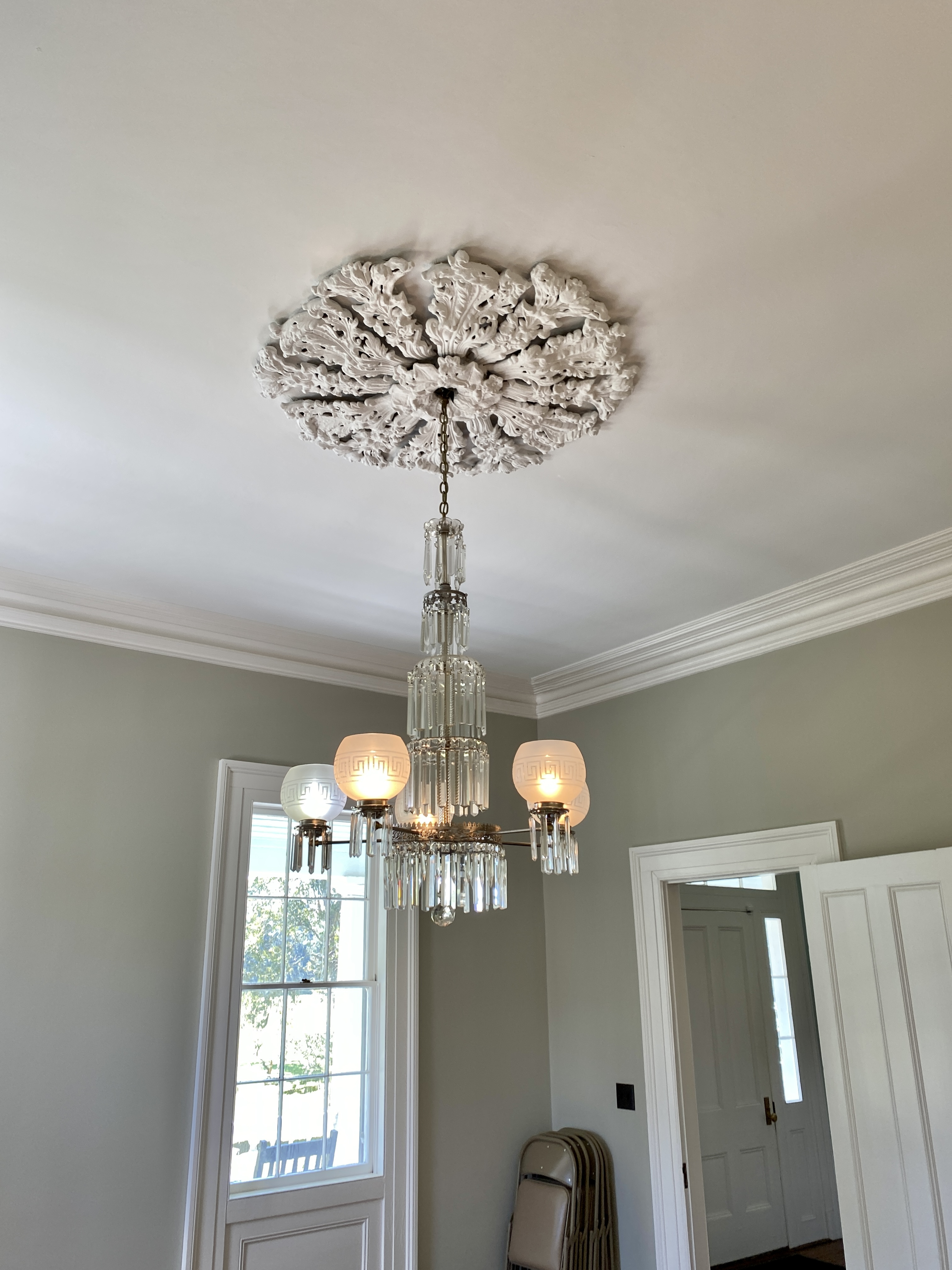

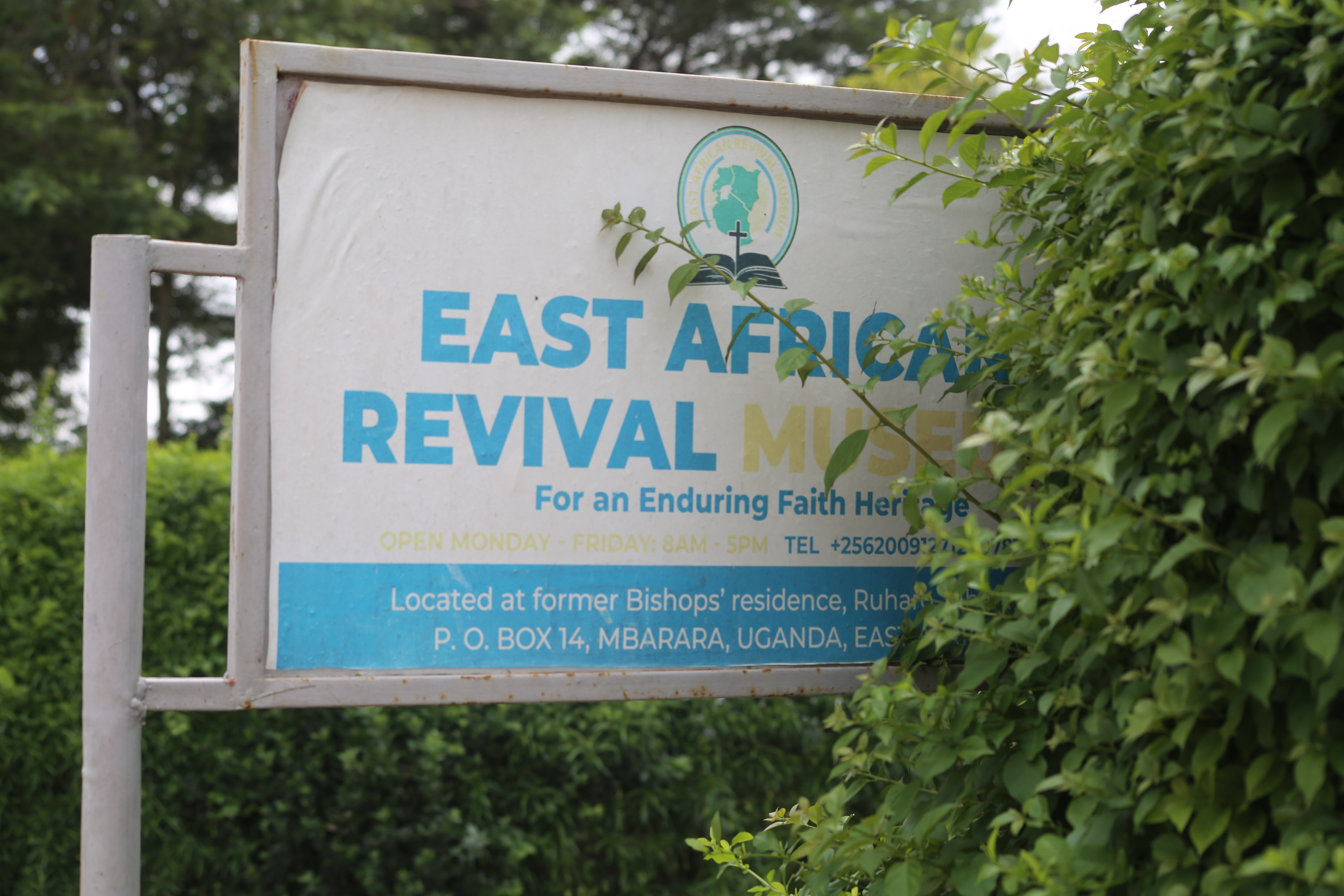

== Collections ==
The museum's collection was assembled through a methodical process of acquiring personal papers, photographs, and objects associated with key figures in the Revival, such as Dr. Joe Church and Simeoni Nsibambi. A central component of its founding involved recording and archiving the first-hand testimonies of participants to create a primary resource for the movement's study. The museum has artifacts, manuscripts, and collections. Exhibits include :

- Personal items of the museum
- traditional tools
- historical documents
- Artistic depictions

== See also ==
- Uganda Museum
