= Gatunda =

Coordinates: 1.4183°S 30.1631°E

Gatunda Sector
- Sector
- Interactive map of Gatunda Sector
- Country: Rwanda
- Province: Eastern Province
- District: Nyagatare District

Area
  - Total: 52 km^{2} (20 sq mi)
  - Land: 52 km^{2} (20 sq mi)
  - Water: 0 km^{2} (0 sq mi)

Population (2012 census)
  - Total: 27,879
  - Density: 535/km^{2} (1,390/sq mi)

Gatunda is one of the 14 sectors (imirenge) of Nyagatare District, Eastern Province, Rwanda. It is located in the central West of the district, and North East of Rwanda. It is the second smallest sector in Nyagatare District, and the third most densely populous with the density of almost twice the district average. This high density of the population is the result of the fertile soil found in the sector. The main economic activity is agriculture. Beans, maize, peanuts, sorghum, and pineapples are grown there. The sector contains large banana plantations. As part of the Umutara region, the sector is also known for cattle husbandry. Gatunda Sector is divided into seven cells: Nyangara, Nyarurema, Cyagaju, Rwensheke, Nyamikamba, Nyamirembe and Kabeza. The office of Gatunda Sector is located in Nyamirembe Cell in the extreme North East section of the Sector.

Gatunda is mainly a rural sector. It is however very densely populated with 677 inhabitants per square kilometer, which is the double of Nyagatare District density, and higher than the national population density. Major settlements in the sectors are Muhambo and Ku Muhanda in Nyangara; Nyarurema, Buguma and Shabana in Nyarurema cell; and Kirindimure in Nyamirembe cell. The population of the sector is majority Roman Catholic although Protestantism is on the rise. This sector is part of Catholic Church Parishes of Nyarurema (Western side) and Rukomo (Eastern side). The Nyarurema parish church is built in Nyarurema Cell. The Catholic Church and its missionaries have a broad variety of activities in the sector such as schools, a health center, and local development projects. Nyarurema Health Center and Nyarurema High School (Ecole Technique Paroissiale de Nyarurema) are Roman Catholic Church run institutions. Muhambo Health Center, another health institution in the sector is government run.

== Map of Gatunda Sector ==
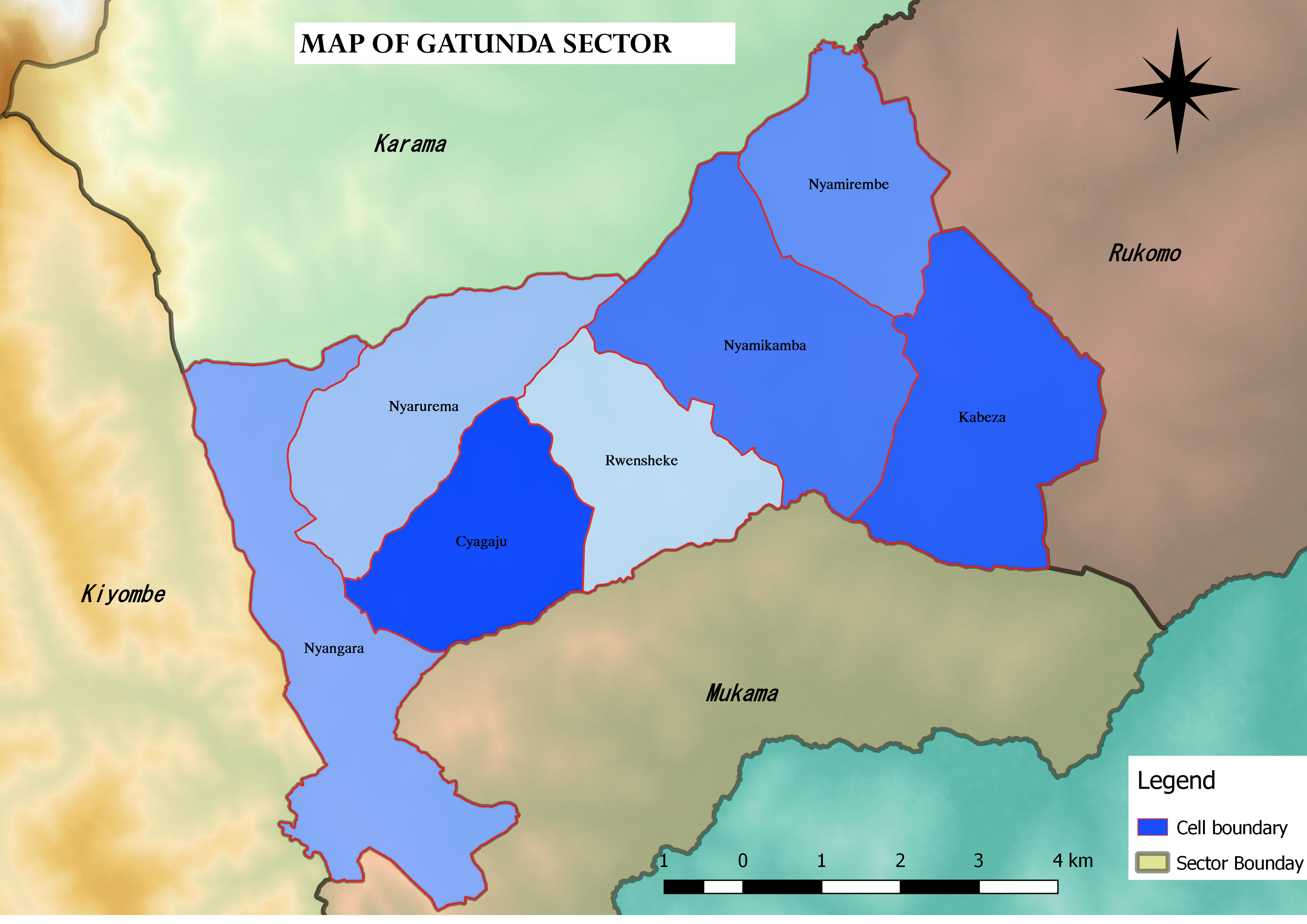

== Panorama of Nyarurema Hill ==
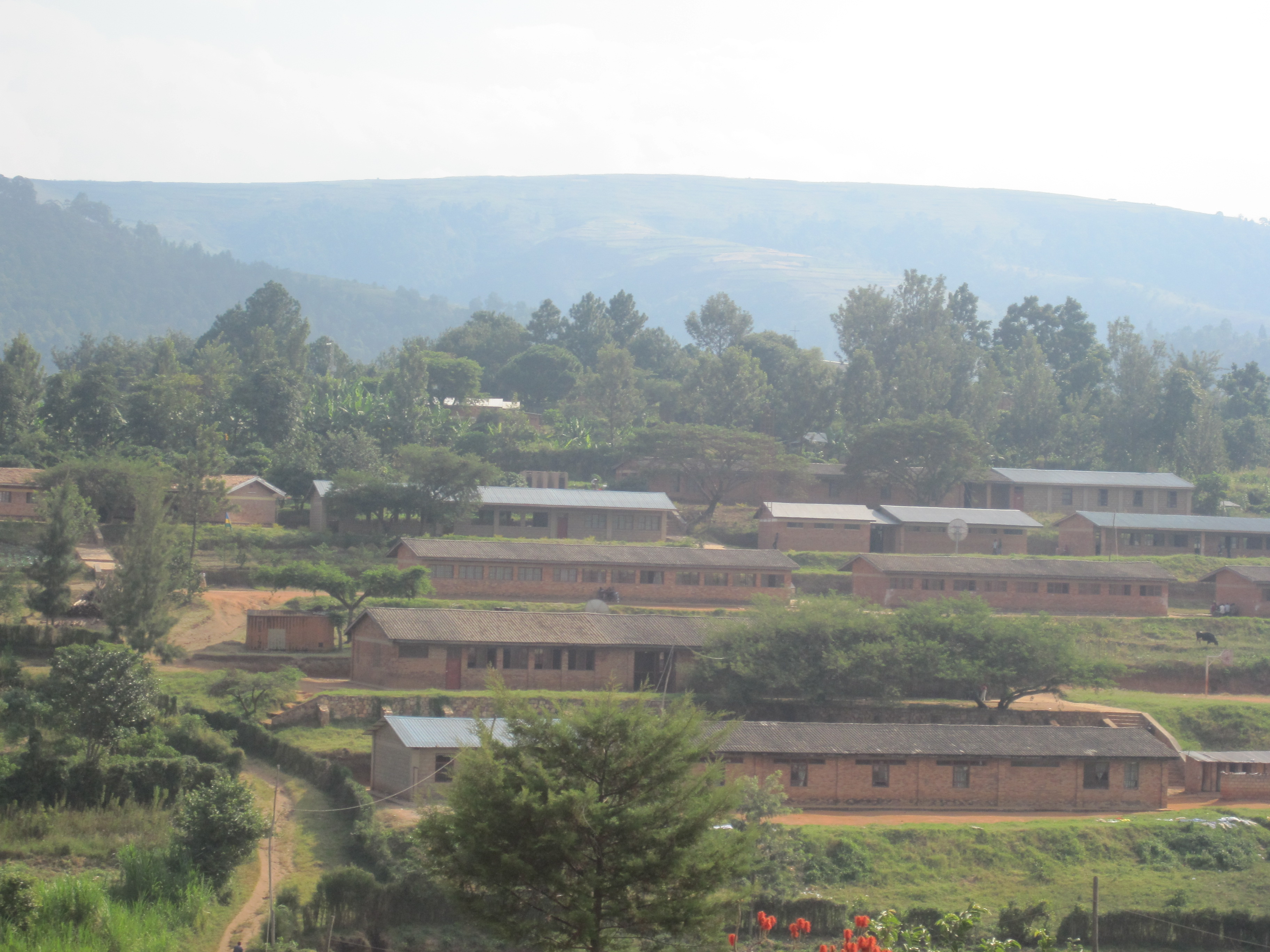
Nyarurema High School, Gatunda, Nyagatare District
