= Mukama =

Mukama is a surname. Notable people with the surname include:

- Jean-Victor Mukama (born 1994), Canadian-Rwandan basketball player
- Ruth Mukama, Ugandan academic professor
- William Mukama, Ugandan politician
- Wilson Mukama, Tanzanian CCM politician
