= Anglican Diocese of Gasabo =

Anglican diocese in Rwanda

Diocese of Gasabo Diyosezi y'Abangilikani ya Gasabo

Location
- Country: Rwanda
- Territory: Northern Kigali
- Archdeaconries: 2

Statistics
- Parishes: 12
- Churches: 16

Information
- Rite: Anglican
- Cathedral: Holy Trinity Cathedral
- Language: Kinyarwanda, French, English

Current leadership
- Bishop: Manasseh Gahima
- Assistant bishop: Paul Donison

Website
- eargasabo.rw

The Anglican Diocese of Gasabo is one of 13 dioceses in the Anglican Church of Rwanda. It was founded in 2011 from the northern area of the Diocese of Kigali.

== History ==
In 2010, the Anglican Church of Rwanda bishops voted to create a new diocese in the northern parts of Kigali. The first diocesan bishop was Onesphore Rwaje, who was simultaneously elected archbishop of Rwanda to succeed Emmanuel Kolini. In 2016, Rwaje and Rwandan First Lady Jeannette Kagame celebrated the 50th anniversary of Mothers' Union programs in an event in the diocese.

In March 2018, Rwaje inaugurated the newly built, 1,000-seat Holy Trinity Cathedral in the Kibagabaga parish. Later that year, Laurent Mbanda succeeded Rwaje both as primate and as bishop of Gasabo.

== Education ==
The Gasabo Diocese offers early childhood, school-based and vocational education offerings. In addition, more than 7,000 members participate in 180 Bible study programs across the diocese.

== Bishops ==
The bishop of Gasabo is by custom also the archbishop and primate of the Anglican Church of Rwanda. Since 2011, bishops of Gasabo have been:

1. Onesphore Rwaje (2011–2018)
2. Laurent Mbanda (2018–2026)
3. Manasseh Gahima (2026–present)
