= Rukomo =

- Town and sector
- Location within Rwanda
- Coordinates: 1.37599°S 30.25098°E
- Country: Rwanda
- Province: Eastern Province
- District: Nyagatare District

Area
  - Town and sector: 58.46 km^{2} (22.57 sq mi)

Population (2022 census)
  - Town and sector: 43,650
  - Density: 746.7/km^{2} (1,934/sq mi)
  - Urban: 18,847

UMURENGE WA RUKOMO

Rukomo is a town and sector in Nyagatare District, Eastern Province in Rwanda, with a population of 43,650 (2022 census) and an area of 58.46 square kilometers.
