= Karama, Rwanda =

Karama
- Town and sector
- Location within Rwanda
- Coordinates: 1.39549°S 30.15401°E
- Country: Rwanda
- Province: Eastern Province
- District: Nyagatare District

Area
  - Town and sector: 53.75 km^{2} (20.75 sq mi)

Population (2022 census)
  - Town and sector: 32,949
  - Density: 613.0/km^{2} (1,588/sq mi)
  - Urban: 5,302

Karama is a small town and sector in Nyagatare District, Eastern Province in Rwanda with a population of 32,949 (2022 census) and an area of 53.75 square kilometers.
