= Kagitumba =

- Tracing the path to Freedom

- Location in Rwanda
- Coordinates: 01°04′20″S 30°27′00″E
- Country: Rwanda
- Provinces of Rwanda: Eastern Province
- District: Nyagatare District
- Elevation: 4,300 ft (1,300 m)

Kagitumba is a town in Rwanda. It is located at the extreme North Eastern extremity at the confluence of the Kagitumba River and Akagera River. This location is also the tri-point border between Rwanda, Uganda and Tanzania.

== Location ==
Kagitumba is located in Nyagatare District, Eastern Province, at the border with the Republic of Uganda. Its location lies very close and is immediately west of the geographical point where the International borders of Rwanda, Tanzania and Uganda intersect. This location is approximately 38 kilometres (24 mi), by road, northeast of Nyagatare, the location of the district headquarters. Kagitumba lies approximately 136 kilometres (85 mi), by road, northeast of Kigali, the capital of Rwanda and the largest city in that country. The coordinates of the town are:1° 4' 20.00"S, 30° 27' 0.00"E (Latitude:-1.072223; Longitude:30.450000).

== Overview ==
Kagitumba is one of the major border crossing points between Rwanda and Uganda; the other being Gatuna. Currently, plans are underway to integrate customs and immigration clearance procedures between the two countries, to create a one-stop clearance mechanism in both directions. When formalised, the new process will dramatically cut down waiting times for both human and commercial traffic between the two East African Community member countries.

== Population ==
The exact population of Kagitumba, Rwanda is not known as of April 2012.

== Points of Interest ==
The landmarks within the town limits or close to the edges of town include:

- Offices of Kagitumba Town Council
- Kagitumba Central Market
- The International Border Crossing between Rwanda and Uganda
- The town of Mirama Hills, in Uganda, lies across the International border, directly north of Kagitumba
- The point where River Muvumba empties into River Kagera, to mark the intersection of the International borders between Rwanda, Tanzania and Uganda

== See also ==
- Mirama Hills
- Nyagatare District
- Eastern Province, Rwanda
- Nyagatare
- River Kagera
- River Muvumba
