= Ntungamo–Mirama Hills Road =

Road in Uganda

Coordinates: 00°59′07″S 30°21′03″E

Route information
- Length: 23 mi (37 km)
- History: Designated in 2014; Completion in 2017.

Major junctions
- North end: Ntungamo
- South end: Mirama Hills

Location
- Country: Uganda

Highway system
- Roads in Uganda

The Ntungamo–Mirama Hills Road in the Western Region of Uganda connects the towns of Ntungamo and Mirama Hills, both in Ntungamo District.

== Location ==
The road starts at Ntungamo and continues southeast, ending at Mirama Hills at the international border with Rwanda, a distance of approximately 35 kilometres (22 mi).

== Upgrading to bitumen ==
On 6 October 2014, President Yoweri Museveni officially commissioned the upgrading of this road to a bitumen surface. It is funded jointly by the government of Uganda (50 percent) and TradeMark East Africa, a subsidiary of the United Kingdom's Department for International Development (US$22 million). The road was expected to be ready for use in April 2016. After delays related to land compensation, the expected completion date was moved to December 2016. In September 2017, The EastAfrican, reported that the road had been completed.

== See also ==
- Economy of Uganda
- List of roads in Uganda
