= Guasaule River =

River in northern Nicaragua and southern Honduras

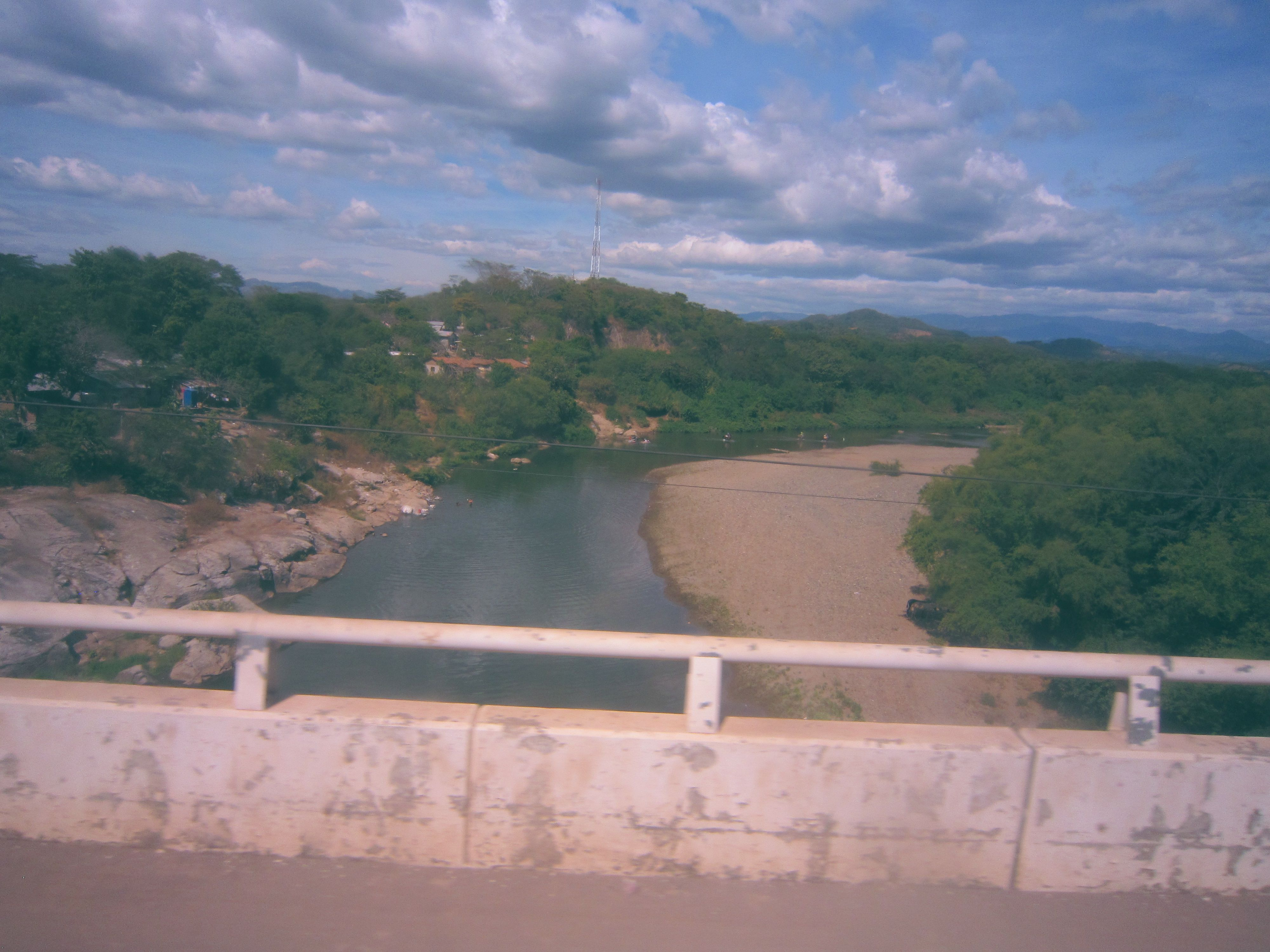
- Río Guasaule at the Border between Honduras and Nicaragua

Location
- Countries: Nicaragua and Honduras

Physical characteristics
- Mouth
  - coordinates: 13°1′0″N 86°59′0″W
  - elevation: 20 ft (6.1 m)

The Guasaule River (Spanish: Río Guasaule) is a river in northern Nicaragua and southern Honduras.

== See also ==
- Honduras–Nicaragua border
