= Karangazi =

- Town and sector
- Location within Rwanda
- Coordinates: 1.404205°S 30.39226°E
- Country: Rwanda
- Province: Eastern Province
- District: Nyagatare District

Area
  - Town and sector: 550.3 km^{2} (212.5 sq mi)

Population (2022 census)
  - Town and sector: 96,915
  - Density: 176.1/km^{2} (456.1/sq mi)
  - Urban: 27,343

Karangazi is a town and sector in Nyagatare District, Eastern Province in Rwanda, with a population of 96,915 (2022 census) and an area of 550.3 square kilometers.
