= Ruth Mukama =

Ugandan academic professor

Professor Ruth Mukama
- Born: 4 December 1946 (age 79); Budaka, Pallisa district, Uganda
- Other name: Gimbo
- Citizenship: Ugandan
- Education: Bachelor of Arts in English Literature, History and French PhD in general Linguistics
- Occupation: Professor
- Employer: Kabale University
- Known for: Introducing teaching of kiswahili language in education institutions First female dean of faculty at Makerere University
- Notable work: Linguistics, Advocating for Gender equity and mentorship
- Board member of: Kabale University council, Kabale University senate Mulago Hospital interim board Editorial committee of editorial journals Inaugiral Letures Organisation Committee

Ruth Mukama Gimbo (born 4 December 1946) is a Ugandan academic professor specializing in linguistics and African languages who has contributed significantly to higher education in Uganda, serving at institutions like Kabale University and Makerere University. She introduced teaching kishwahili in learning institutions. Her expertise spans teaching, research, and advocacy for gender equality. Beyond academia, she is also involved in farming and mentoring young people.

== Background and education ==
Ruth Mukama was born in December 1946, in Budaka Pallisa district. Her father Yokonea Mukama(RIP) was a primary school teacher and her mother, Agnes Baluka was a staunch christian. Ruth attended Budaka Primary School for her primary level education. She then joined Busia SS and Gayaza High School for her secondary level education. She then enrolled at Makerere University where she graduated with an Honours Degree in English Literature, History and French. Later, Ruth attained a PhD in General Linguistics from the University of York in England without first doing a masters as required.

== Career ==
Ruth Mukama has worked in the field of academia where she has served to different academic institutions as a lecturer, Associate professor, professor and in other leadership capacities.

Kabale University, Kabale(since July 2018),

Prof Ruth Mukama has worked with Kabale University a professor of linguistics, where she introduced a masters degree of Arts in Linguistics. She was the Head, Department of African languages. In April, 2019, she became a Member of the Kabale University Senate and a Member of the joint Council. Since 2019 she has been the Chair of the Inaugural Lectures Organizing Committee.

Makerere University, Kampala, (June 1979 to December 2016 )

- 2008-April 2009, Chaired the Technical Working Group that developed the Gender Policy for Makerere University. Played a pivotal role in conducting research, managing group discussions as well as the actual formulation and editing of the final draft of the Gender Policy together with Prof. Sylvia tamale
- Nov 2005 to August 2007 was Ag Head, Gender Mainstreaming Division (now a Directorate) Academic Registrar's Department.
- March 1995 to December 2016: Coordinator of the Kiswahili Programme, Department of African Languages, Makerere University. Sole architect of the Kiswahili undergraduate programmes, both advanced and beginners, as well as the old Masters Programme in Languages, and the successor programme: the Masters in African Languages.
- 2001/02 Authored and successfully launched the semesterized graduate programme of the Master of Arts in African Languages, which I still coordinate. Authored several other semesterized programmes.
- 2000/01 represented the Senate on the Committee on Gender Mainstreaming, on the Makerere University Carnegie Steering Committee and contributed greatly to gender-mainstreaming all the proposals which were submitted to the Carnegie Corporation for funding for that phase, which was a requirement, set by the funding partners.
- July 2001 In conjunction with Dr. Kabonesa of the Department of Women and Gender Studies wrote and ably defended the Proposal for the establishment of the Gender Mainstreaming Division in Makerere University, Phase I: October 2001 – September 2004, which attracted US dollars 610,000 from the Carnegie Corporation of New York.
- 1999 – 2008 Was an active member of the Senate Committee on Gender Mainstreaming, which drew up the Gender Mainstreaming Plan for Makerere University.
- 1979 – 1989 Member of the Editorial Board of Mawazo, journal of the College of Humanities and Social Sciences.

University College of Botswana, Gaberone: Nov. 1978-1979 Lecturer in Linguistics and English Language to undergraduate students and Head of the graduate programme of English Language and Linguistics.

University of Dar-es-Salaam, Tanzania: Dec. 1976-1978 Lecturer in Kiswahili to undergraduates and in Linguistics to the Masters students. Coordinator, the Joint Graduate Programme for the Departments of Foreign Languages and Kiswahili.

University of Zambia, Lusaka: 1973-1976 Lecturer in Linguistics and English Language to undergraduates. Coordinator of the Correspondence Programme for the English Language and the Zambian Languages. Managed and was the Chief Tutor on the graduate programme for the Faculties of Arts and Education.

== Achievements ==
Kabale University

- 2018 August-2020, Head, Department of African languages
- 2019 April, Member of the Kabale University Senate
- 2019 April, Member of the joint Council/Senate Search Committee for the Deputy Vice- Chancellors, for Kabale University as well as for the Vice Chancellor (12 April 2021).
- Since 2019 Chair of the Inaugural Lectures Organizing Committee

Makerere University,

- May 1994 to December 2016 Professor of Linguistics
- Feb 1989-April 1994 Associate Professor
- Nov 1982-January 1989 Senior Lecturer
- June 1979-October 1982 Lecturer in Linguistics, English Language Studies and Kiswahili.
- Nov. 2005-August 2007 Ag Head, Gender Mainstreaming Division in Academic Registrar's Department.
- June 1991-March 1995 Dean, Faculty of Arts, Makerere University.
- 2002-2008 Member of the Makerere University Senate.
- 2002-2006 Member of the Makerere University Council.
- June 1986-May 1991 Head, Department of Languages, Makerere University.
- 1986-1989 Chairperson of the Joint Board of Graduate Studies for the Faculties of Arts and Social Sciences.

Other Areas,

- September 2005-July 2006 Chaired the Presidential Commission of Inquiry into Bunyoro Issues.
- March 2003-March 2008 Member of the Mulago Hospital Interim Board of Directors which is charged with the task of preparing the Hospital for autonomy, among other terms of reference.
- November 2003-2008 Vice Chair and since 2009 substantive Chair of the Board of Directors of the Eastern Private Sector Development Centre Limited (EPSEDEC), based in Mbale, a Company Limited by Guarantee without a Share Capital, whose mission is to provide capacity development services that empower individuals and communities.
- 1982-1993 Represented UNESCO (Paris) Uganda at the regional forums in Dar-es-Salaam that developed technical terminologies for Kiswahili for different scholarly and socio-economic fields.
- Since July 1988 Member, the International Advisory Board to the project: “Language and Popular Culture in Africa”, based at the Anthropological – Sociological Centre, University of Amsterdam.
- Since 1980 Active involvement in the women's movement:
- 1980-1984 Subscribed to the National Council of Women and the Uganda Association of University Women.
- 1985 to date Active member of Action for Development (ACFODE)
- 1999 to date Chair of the Uganda Women Girl Child Concern (UWOGICO) 1996-1999 Contracted by several women's NGOs for different assignments pertaining to preparation of publications, editing, Rapporteur work and 10 translation: Eastern African Sub-Regional Initiative for the Advancement of Women EASSI) (1999), Forum for Women in Democracy (FOWODE) (1998 99), ISIS-WICCE (1997-2000), Uganda Women's Network (UWONET) (1996) and the Ministry of Gender (1990-2003).
- Since 1977 Member of the Advisory Board to the Editorial Committee of the three International journals: Kiswahili, Kioo cha Lugha and Mulika published by the Institute of Kiswahili Studies of the University of Dar-es Salaam.
- 1995-2000 Member of the First Board of Directors, Busoga University; wrote and designed the initial image-building documentation for the university.
