= East African Revival =

Christian renewal movement in East Africa

The East African Revival (Luganda: Okulokoka) was a movement of renewal in the Christian Church in East Africa during the late 1920s and 1930s. It began on a hill called Gahini in then Belgian Ruanda-Urundi in 1929, and spread to the eastern mountains of Belgian Congo, Uganda Protectorate (British Uganda), Tanganyika Territory and Kenya Colony during the 1930s and 1940s. The revival reshaped the Anglican Church already present in East Africa and contributed to its significant growth from the 1940s into the 1970s.

== Christianity before the Revival ==
In the 19th century, East Africa was largely colonized by European forces: the Germans in Tanganyika, Rwanda, and Burundi and the British in Uganda and Kenya. Christian missionaries first began their missionary work in Uganda, then named Buganda (home of the Baganda or Ganda people), in 1877. The elites were quick to convert, and experienced high martyrdom in 1885, sparking the initial growth of Christianity in Buganda and the region. Protestantism took root in this region faster than in many of the other colonial regions during this time, and the Church of Uganda was established around 1893. The Church was established with equal participation of the European missionaries and African converts. The early Church of Uganda and the Christians in the area were disproportionately rich and prosperous at the time, echoing the elitism in British and North American Protestant churches. A branch of the Church Missionary Society, the Ruanda Mission, evangelized in Ruanda-Urundi, which became a Belgian territory under a League of Nations mandate following the First World War. This mission group was essential in the spread of the revival.

During the early 20th century, some members of the Church of Uganda became dissatisfied with the ways in which sin was being handled and how modernity had affected its practices. The initial fervor that led to the spread of Christianity in the region reached a lull as time progressed and corruption within the Church emerged.

== The Revival ==
=== Spread of the Revival ===
Corruption prompted some members to seek a method to renew the faith and the community. There is no event that marked the start of the revival movement in East Africa, but Simeon Nsibambi is seen as one of the key initiators of the movement. Nsibambi learned and taught in the church in Kampala, Uganda for a time, though he was settled in Gahini, Ruanda. Nsibambi brought his dissatisfaction with the sin of the church leadership and his search for revival from Uganda to Rwanda, and the revival movement began to take root in northern Rwanda. Many argue that the relationship between Joe Church, the pioneer of the Ruanda Mission, and Nsibambi in 1929 in Gahini was the official spark of the revival movement. Dr. Church worked at the Gahini Hospital and the revival started with the staff there. It was largely grassroots, spread through the formation of small groups of people and through personal relationships. Many accounts from individuals involved in the movement cite the power of the Holy Spirit as essential for the success seen by the revival.

The movement, spearheaded in part by the Ruanda Mission, was able to cross borders into multiple countries because the church in the Kigezi district in southwest Uganda was placed under its jurisdiction. This allowed the movement to spread further back into Uganda. Two additional places to which the revival spread were Kenya and Tanganyika. The revival moved into Kenya in 1937 as the Ruanda Mission sent a team to Kabete, outside of Nairobi. The message of unity across racial divisions was especially important to the spread of revival throughout Kenya. William Nagenda was sent with a team and Joe Church to Tanganyika to spread the mission in 1939.

The continuation of the East African Revival was heavily dependent on the movements of individual people revitalizing the enthusiasm for the Anglican Church that had already been established in these former colonies. All of these factors led to the increase in the growth of Christianity in the region following 1940.

=== Principles ===
The major characteristics of the new religious attitude and zeal in the East African Church was the practice of the public confession of sins. Many people who had been nominal Christians were affected by this new passion for Jesus. This activity in response to the corruption and hidden sins of the clergy seen in the Church before revival brought together the community in a unique way that built greater community that reignited the Church.

== Legacy ==
Dr. Church worked to bring European and African church leaders from different ethnic groups together in planning the various stages of the revival. The revival hymn ‘’Tukutendereza Yesu’’ (“We Praise You Jesus”) is a symbol of the revival, showing the unifying influence of the revival for spiritual Christians along East Africa.

Balokole is the Lugandan word for ‘the saved people’, and the ‘Balokole Revival’ reverberates through Africa in the 21st century. The revival has had a particularly lasting affect in Rwanda, Uganda, Tanzania and Kenya.

The Anglican Church in Uganda has an East African Revival Museum in Mbarara city.

== See also ==
- Christianity in Africa
- Christianity in Rwanda
- Christianity in Kenya
- Protestantism in Uganda
- Protestantism in Tanzania
- Anglican Diocese of Gahini
