= Rapirrán River =

Location
- Country: Bolivia, Brazil, Peru

Physical characteristics
- Mouth
  - coordinates: 10°20′S 67°11′W

The Rapirrán River (Spanish: Río Rapirrán, Portuguese: Rio Rapirrã) is a river of South America. Beginning in western Brazil just east of the Peruvian border, the river forms the international border with Peru as it flows eastward. It then forms Bolivia's northernmost border with Brazil.

The town of Rapirrán lies on the river.

== See also ==
- List of rivers of Bolivia
