= John Edward Church =

John Edward Church (10 August 1899 - 29 September 1989), commonly referred to as Joe Church, was a British missionary who served with Church Mission Society (CMS). Church served primarily in Rwanda and Uganda. He left England in 1927 and served as a missionary for 44 years, alternating between medical and evangelistic missions. He is widely known for playing a key role in the East African Revival. Additionally he served as a doctor in Rwanda for over a decade and constructed hospitals and a church. He has been recognized for his work by governments in East Africa and Europe.

== Early life ==
John Edward Church was born to Edward Joseph Church and Florence Edith Church in 1899. He grew up in a Cambridgeshire village named Burrough Green where his father served as a clergyman. He was the oldest of ten children and enjoyed a happy childhood in his small village where he often hunted and played cricket.

=== Education ===
At age 11, John Edward Church began attending the junior school at St Lawrence College, Ramsgate and later moved on to its senior school. He was able to attend this school at no cost because he was the son of a clergy. He did well academically and was well known for his shooting and hockey skills. In his senior year, he was enrolled into the officer cadet training camp of the Tank Corp as a result of World War I. At 19 years old, he was ranked as second lieutenant and served with the Twentieth Battalion at Bovington in Dorset. The war ended soon after this and through the British Army, he obtained a grant to attend Emmanuel College at the University of Cambridge to study medicine. At Emmanuel College, John Edwards was heavily involved with Cambridge Inter-Collegiate Christian Union where he began a Bible class and was the club’s college representative. His interest in mission work stemmed from this club. Church did his medical training at St Bartholomew’s Hospital in London. In preparation for practicing medicine abroad, he pursued further training as a house surgeon and casualty officer at Addenbrooke’s Hospital, Cambridge. He received his Doctor of Medicine (MD) in 1926.

=== Personal life ===
John Church married Decima Tracey, who was also a trained doctor, on May 19, 1930 in Uganda. The couple had five children: John, David, Robin, Michael, and Janine, all born in Rwanda or Uganda. Dr. Decima Tracey Church was an important part of Dr. Joe’s mission work and she often assisted with his medical work.

His brothers William Church and Howard Church were also missionaries.

== Mission Work ==
=== Medical Missions ===
On October 28, 1927, Church set sail for his mission in Rwanda. He first arrived in Kabale, Uganda where he received missions training from Church Mission Society (CMS) for five months. Once his training was completed, Church was sent to Gahini, Rwanda, a village in northeastern Rwanda. He immediately began planning to build a new hospital building since there was an overwhelming demand for medical care. Gahini, Rwanda was experiencing a famine when he first began his work so he dealt with many cases of skin sores and diarrhea. He wrote many appeals to the Belgian and British government for food supplies to Rwanda and Uganda, his pleas were heard and he was recognized by the local Gahini government for helping with the famine crisis. Once Gahini Hospital was built, he worked there for eight years. He established a dispensary and often did life-saving surgeries and amputations. He was later given permission by the Rwandan government to establish more hospitals and dispensaries which he did in alliance with CMS. After eight years, he felt called to full time ministerial missions in Rwanda and Uganda and his younger brother, Dr. Bill Church, took over for him at Gahini Hospital.

=== Evangelical Missions ===
Church and his family moved to Kabale, Uganda where he would focus on his evangelical missions for eight years. In his first year of full time evangelical missions, he wrote a book of Bible studies titled Every Man a Bible Student with over 40 studies. He used this book as a tool to train young men interested in ministry around Uganda and Rwanda. Aside from training future ministry workers, he also led many mission trips and held many conferences for the Anglican Church in Rwanda and Uganda. He organized and attended multiple evangelical tours in other locations such as including Pakistan, India, and multiple South American countries. In 1943, Church was called back to medical missions because there was need for a doctor at Gahini Hospital. For about two years, he worked one out of every three months at Gahini Hospital. In 1947, he and his family officially moved back to Gahini, Rwanda where he served as a doctor and helped pastor the 300 village churches. He continued leading the revival in Rwanda and rebuilt the Gahini hospital during his time there.

He worked with leaders including Festo Kivengere, Erica Sabiti, Blasio Kigozi, Yosiya Kinuka, Simeoni Nsibambi and William Nagenda.

In 1961, Church's refusal to discriminate between ethnical groups earned him the disapproval of Rwandan revolutionaries and it was deemed necessary for Church to leave Rwanda; he moved to Uganda and set up a hospital in Kabarole with his son. On his retirement in 1965, the Churchs lived on the shores of Lake Victoria; they left Africa for England in 1972 during Idi Amin’s regime.

== Legacy ==
Church was affiliated with Church Mission Society (CMS) for the entirety of his mission work and they described him as a, “pioneer of missionary of the Rwanda Mission.” During his time in East Africa, Church established Gahini Hospital, with his son Dr John Church and also helped his son Robin Church, who became a medical missionary, reconstruct and develop the hospital at Kabarole, Toro. In Uganda, he and other missionaries established Kabale Preparatory School as a school for missionary children in Rwanda.

Church was appointed as the Rwandan king’s physician and later on his son, John Church, was also the King’s physician. Dr. Joe and Dr. Decie were recognized for their work by King Baudouin of Belgium and were awarded the ‘medaille d’ or de l’ordre royal du Lion’. Church published his autobiography, Quest for the Highest - an autobiographical account of the East African revival in 1981. Church officially retired in 1972 in Little Shelford, England. Church died, aged ninety, on September 29, 1989, in a Royston nursing home.

== Publications ==
- Quest for the highest : an autobiographical account of the East African revival
- Awake! : an African calling: the story of Blasio Kigozi and his vision of revival

== See also ==
John Howard Cook
