= Mirama Hills =

- Map of Uganda showing the location of Mirama Hills
- Coordinates: 01°03′03″S 30°27′36″E
- Country: Uganda
- Region: Western
- Sub-region: Ankole
- District: Ntungamo
- Elevation: 1,360 m (4,460 ft)
- Time zone: UTC+3 (EAT)

Mirama Hills is a town in the Western Region of Uganda.

== Location ==
Mirama Hills is located in Ntungamo District, Ankole sub-region. The town is at Uganda's border with Rwanda and lies very close to where the borders of Uganda, Rwanda, and Tanzania intersect. It is approximately 350 kilometres (220 mi), by road, southwest of Kampala, Uganda's capital and largest city. This is approximately 37 kilometres (23 mi), by road, southeast of Ntungamo, the administrative center and the largest town in the district. The coordinates of the town are:1°03'03.0"S, 30°27'36.0"E (Latitude:-1.050820; Longitude:30.459990).

== Overview ==
The small town of Mirama Hills, Ntungamo District, in Southwestern Uganda, sits on Uganda's border with the Republic of Rwanda, very close to the three-corners point where the borders of the two countries meet with the border with Tanzania. To the immediate north of the town lie the hills from which the town derives its name, rising to heights of 1,560 metres (5,120 ft), above sea-level. The town lies on the banks of River Muvumba, a tributary of the Kagera River. Immediately south of Mirama Hills, across the border, in Rwanda, lies the town of Kagitumba. The Mirama Hills - Kagitumba border crossing is one of the two busiest transit points between Uganda and Rwanda; the other being the Katuna - Gatuna border crossing. Between 2011 and 2015, the border crossing underwent upgrades to facilitate a single clearance process involving one joint stop for both countries.

== Points of interest ==
The following points of interest lie within the town limits or close to the edges of the town:

- The offices of Mirama Hills Town Council
- The International Border Crossing between Uganda and the Republic of Rwanda
- The confluence of Muvumba River and Kagera River - This point marks the confluence of the International borders of Rwanda, Tanzania and Uganda.
- Mirama Hills Central Market
- The Ntungamo–Mirama Hills Road - The previously gravel road, was improved to class II bitumen standard with culverts and drainage channels, between October 2014, and September 2017.

== See also ==
- Ntungamo
- Kagitumba
- Ntungamo District
- URA
