= Nyagatare District =

Coordinates: 01°18′S 30°20′E

- District
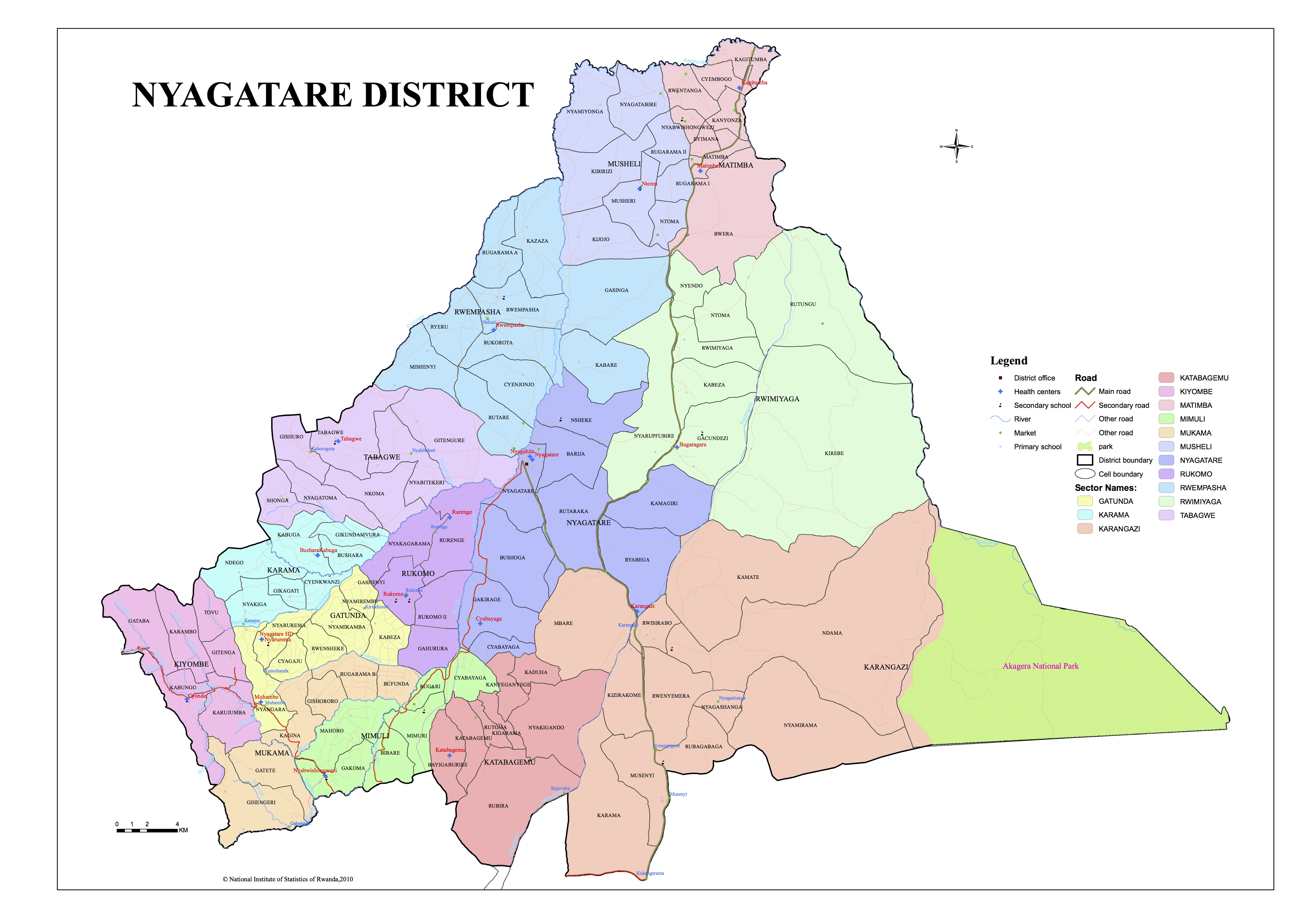
- Country: Rwanda
- Province: Eastern Province

Area
  - Total: 1,741 km^{2} (672 sq mi)
  - Land: 1,738 km^{2} (671 sq mi)
  - Water: 3 km^{2} (1.2 sq mi)

Population (2022 census)
  - Total: 653,861
  - Density: 373/km^{2} (970/sq mi)

Nyagatare is the largest and second most populous district (akarere) in Rwanda. Located in Eastern Province, Rwanda, it occupies the northeastern extremity of Rwanda. Its capital is Nyagatare City, the former capital of the now defunct Umutara province. Nyagatare District borders Uganda in the North, Tanzania in the East, Gatsibo District of the (Eastern Province) in the South, and Gicumbi District of the Northern Province in the West. Nyagatare has an area of 1741 km2, what makes it the largest district in Rwanda. With a population of 466,944 in 2012, and 653,861 in 2022, Nyagatare is the second most populated district of Rwanda only after Gasabo District of Kigali City with 879,505 inhabitants. This is a 156% increase from 2002 when the population was only 255,104. This sharp rise in the population is mainly due to the major movement of the population from other parts of the country in search of land.

== Geography ==
Nyagatare is the largest district in Rwanda. Nyagatare lies in an area of grassy plains, and low hills, with excellent views in all directions, including the mountains of southern Uganda and, on a very clear day, the Virunga volcano range. The district has a higher temperature compared to the other parts of the country. It also receives lower precipitations. The land is not farmed as extensively as other areas of the country, and there is a large number of cattle. The area has a higher average daytime temperature than the Rwandan average, and lower precipitation, which come sometimes lead to droughts. The District of Nyagatare is one of the seven districts making the Eastern Province. It is divided into 14 Sectors made of 106 cells and 630 Villages ”Imidugudu”. Spreading an area of 1.741 square kilometers, the district borders with Uganda at the north, Tanzania at its East, at the South by Gatsibo District and by Gicumbi District of the Northern Province on the Western border.

== Sectors ==
Nyagatare District is divided into 14 sectors (imirenge): Gatunda, Kiyombe, Karama, Karangazi, Katabagemu, Matimba, Mimuli, Mukama, Musheli, Nyagatare, Rukomo, Rwempasha, Rwimiyaga and Tabagwe.

== List of Nyagatare Sectors by Population (2012) ==
Rank in Nyagatare Sectors, 2012	Sector	Area in km^{2}	Population August 15, 2012	Population, August 15, 2002	Population Change 2002–2012 (%)	Population Density 2012 (km^{2})
8	Gatunda	52	27,879	19,716	41.4	535
10	Karama	53	26,727	19,727	35.5	499
2	Karangazi	563	56,871	21,234	167.8	101
4	Katabagemu	98	34,651	22,101	56.8	354
14	Kiyombe	69	17,061	16,483	3.5	247
11	Matimba	79	24,168	13,476	79.3	307
9	Mimuli	48	27,366	22,452	21.9	573
12	Mukama	64	21,819	17,970	21.4	339
7	Musheli	96	32,403	14,742	119.8	338
3	Nyagatare	164	52,125	19,475	167.7	317
5	Rukomo	58	34,377	20,945	64.1	588
13	Rwempasha	169	19,328	11,428	69.1	115
1	Rwimiyaga	309	58,847	16,802	250.2	190
6	Tabagwe	106	33,322	18,533	79.6	313
Total	Nyagatare District	1741	466,944	255,104	83.0	243

== Topography ==
The District of Nyagatare is characterized, in general, by lowly inclined hills separated by dry valleys for a long period of the year (June–October). The District is located in the granite low valley whose altitude is 1513.5m. This kind of topographical layout constitutes an important potentiality for modern and mechanized agriculture. A total of 2005 estimates showed that the total population in Nyagatare was 291.452 inhabitants of which 51% were women. The overage density attains 167 inhabitants/km2 which is by far lower than the national density figure of 321 inhabitants/km2. The sectors that are most populated are Mimuli and Katabagemu which have 25.651 and 25.250 inhabitants, respectively. While the less populated are Rwempasha and Matimba having respectively 13.056 and 15.396 inhabitants.

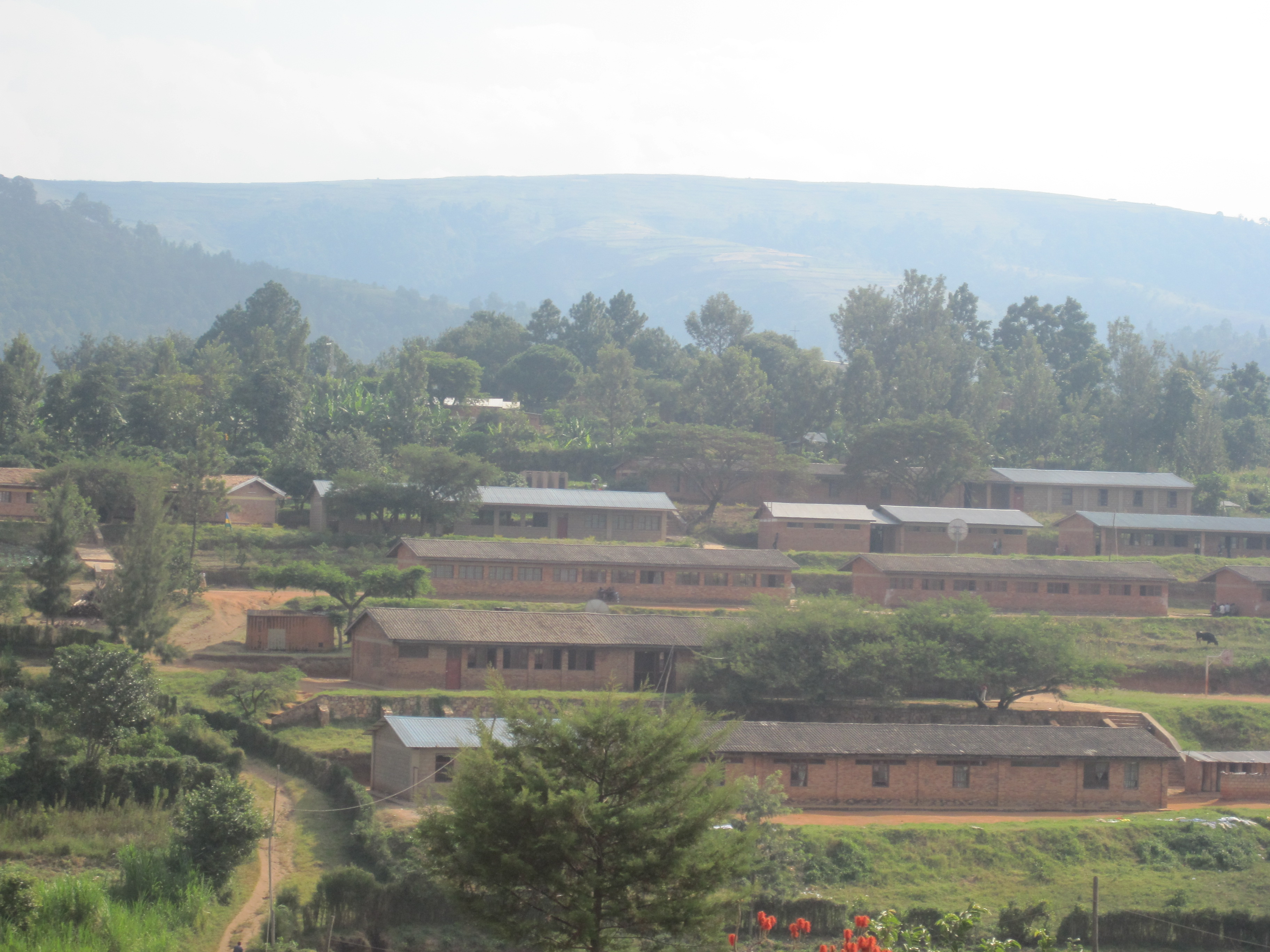
Nyarurema High School, Nyagatare District

== Climate ==
The District of Nyagatare experiences a small quantity of rains and hot temperatures. It is characterized by two main seasons: one long dry season that varies between three and five months with an annual overage temperature varying between 25,3 °C and 27,7 °C. The monthly distribution of the rains varies from one year to another. Annual rainfalls are both very weak (827 mm/an) and very unpredictable to satisfy the needs of agriculture and livestock.

== Hydrographic Description ==
The hydrographic network is very limited in the District of Nyagatare. The Akagera river flows East on the border with Tanzania. The river Kagitumba flows North on the border with Uganda. It ends in the Akagera river at the intersection of the three countries. The River Muvumba that cut across the District is a result of the reunion of two rivers: the Ngoma and the Karungeli. Rice is grown in its large valley. The river is the main water reserve for the people and the cattle in the large dry land. There is no other consistent river that can be exploited by the population in Nyagatare. A few of the rivers found there such as Nyiragahaya, Kayihenda, Karuruma, Nayagasharara and Kaborogota are erratic and intermittent. The weak river network constitutes a serious handicap to responding to the needs of water for people and animals.

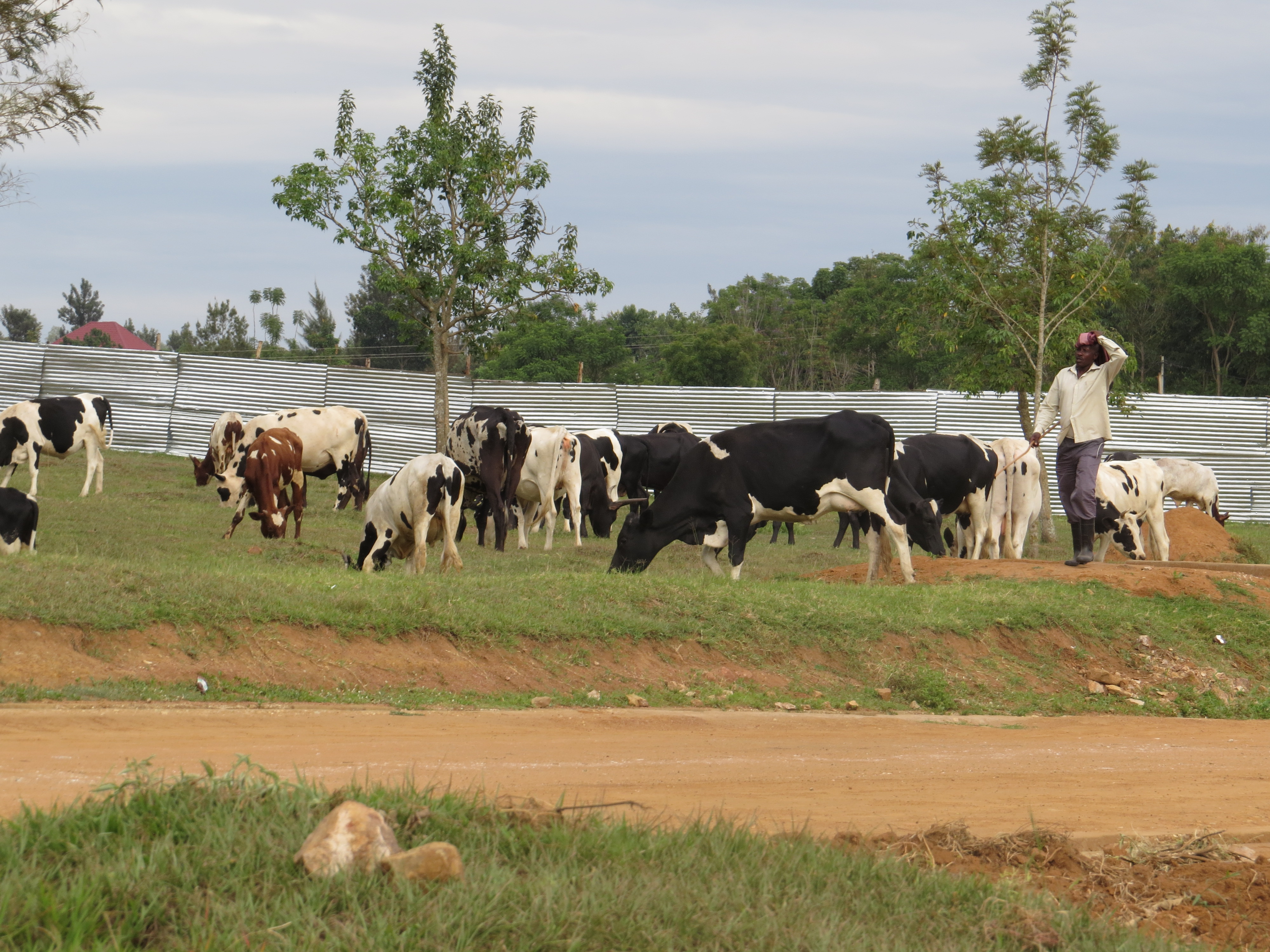
People grazing cows in Rwanda

== Fauna et flora ==
The District of Nyagatare contains half of Akagera National Park where is found a vast number of wildlife including African buffalo, antelopes and more other ruminants. Because the park is not fenced, animals can come out to cause some damages in the neighboring human inhabited areas. The River Umuvumba, contains hippopotamuses, and Nile crocodiles. During flooding, these animals can get close to populated areas with dangerous consequences. The district also accommodates a huge variety of birds such as birds of prey, guineafowl, partridges, herons etc., hares, wild boar, monkeys and other rodents are occasionally found in the wooded savanna.

The flora in Nyagatare is made in general by an afforested savanna vegetation and gallery forests along the rivers. The latter constitutes a reserve.

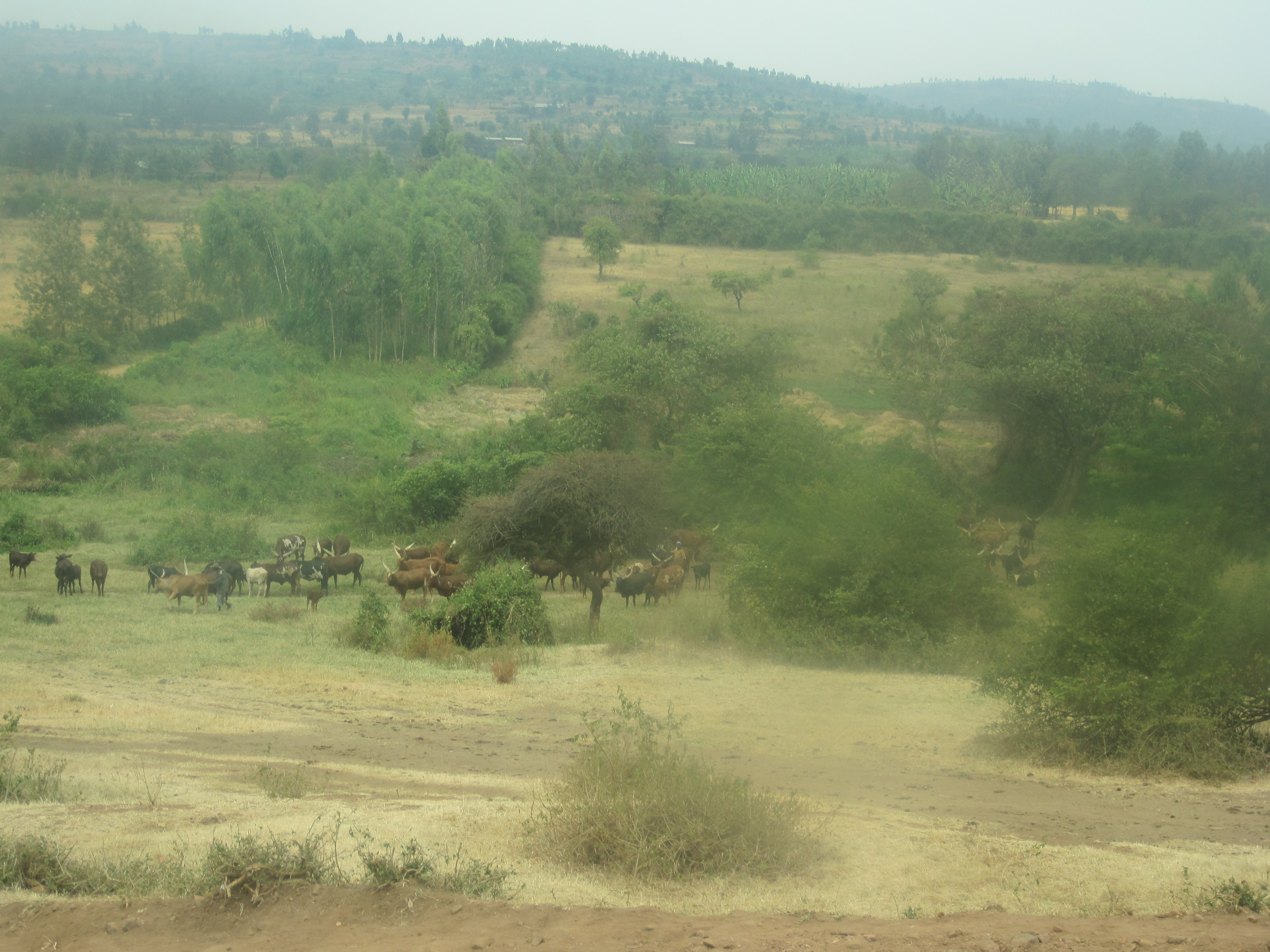
Nyagatare Countryside

== Soil ==
The soil of this area is characterized by the tightness of the humifere layer of the soil brought about by the grassy savanna and by the vertisoils that are rich in nutrients mineral elements but lacking organic substances. These types of soils may be exploited with the help of modern agricultural techniques and form sorts of artificial pastures camps for livestock.
