= Nyagatare =

Nyagatare City
- Location in Rwanda
- Coordinates: 01°17′35″S 30°19′30″E
- Country: Rwanda
- Province: Eastern Province
- District: Nyagatare District
- Elevation: 1,414 m (4,639 ft)

Population (2015 census)
  - Total: 100,000
- Time zone: UTC+2 (Central Africa Time)
- Climate: Aw

Nyagatare is a town in the North East of Rwanda. With a population of more than 100,000, it is one of the most populous settlements in the Eastern Province along with Rwamagana and Kibungo.

== Location ==
Nyagatare is located in Nyagatare District, Eastern Province, close to Rwanda's International borders with both Tanzania and Uganda.

== Overview ==
Nyagatare is the largest metropolitan area and the capital of Nyagatare District, in Eastern Province, in Rwanda's northeast. At the center of a cattle farming region, the city is a point of milk collection for several milk producers such as Inyange Industries Ltd. Milk from Nyagatare is exported to other regions of Rwanda.

== Infrastructure ==
=== Power ===
As of July 2021, only 1% of the population has access to electricity, The Rwandan government is contracting for the construction of a hydroelectric dam and power plant north of Nyangatare on the Muvumbe river.

=== Water ===
25% of households rely on water from public stand posts.

== Population ==
In 2002, the population of Nyagatare was estimated at about 8,500. The population has grown considerably since 1994, boosted by an influx of former refugees from Uganda, reaching 52,107 in the 2012 census.

== Climate ==
Climate data for Nyagatare (1991–2020)
Month	Jan	Feb	Mar	Apr	May	Jun	Jul	Aug	Sep	Oct	Nov	Dec	Year
Record high °C (°F)	34.3 (93.7)	35.4 (95.7)	33.1 (91.6)	32.8 (91.0)	31.0 (87.8)	30.7 (87.3)	31.5 (88.7)	31.8 (89.2)	32.7 (90.9)	32.5 (90.5)	31.7 (89.1)	33.8 (92.8)	35.4 (95.7)
Mean daily maximum °C (°F)	27.9 (82.2)	28.4 (83.1)	27.3 (81.1)	26.7 (80.1)	26.5 (79.7)	27.4 (81.3)	27.9 (82.2)	28.4 (83.1)	28.5 (83.3)	27.1 (80.8)	26.5 (79.7)	27.5 (81.5)	27.5 (81.5)
Daily mean °C (°F)	21.4 (70.5)	21.9 (71.4)	21.4 (70.5)	21.3 (70.3)	21.0 (69.8)	20.9 (69.6)	20.8 (69.4)	21.7 (71.1)	22.1 (71.8)	21.5 (70.7)	21.0 (69.8)	21.4 (70.5)	21.4 (70.5)
Mean daily minimum °C (°F)	14.9 (58.8)	15.4 (59.7)	15.5 (59.9)	15.9 (60.6)	15.5 (59.9)	14.3 (57.7)	13.7 (56.7)	15.0 (59.0)	15.8 (60.4)	15.9 (60.6)	15.6 (60.1)	15.2 (59.4)	15.2 (59.4)
Record low °C (°F)	10.8 (51.4)	11.0 (51.8)	11.8 (53.2)	13.2 (55.8)	10.0 (50.0)	10.6 (51.1)	9.4 (48.9)	10.1 (50.2)	12.0 (53.6)	12.2 (54.0)	12.5 (54.5)	10.8 (51.4)	9.4 (48.9)
Average precipitation mm (inches)	42.8 (1.69)	59.0 (2.32)	121.8 (4.80)	105.9 (4.17)	137.8 (5.43)	28.3 (1.11)	5.4 (0.21)	29.1 (1.15)	75.7 (2.98)	121.5 (4.78)	107.7 (4.24)	72.2 (2.84)	907.1 (35.71)
Average precipitation days (≥ 1.0 mm)	4.1	8.2	11.4	14.4	9.8	2.0	0.8	4.0	8.9	12.3	18.2	10.3	104.4
Source: NOAA
