= An Eerdmans Reader in Contemporary Political Theology =

2011 anthology on political theology

- Editors: William T. Cavanaugh, Jeffrey W. Bailey, Craig Hovey
- Language: English
- Genre: Anthology
- Publisher: William B. Eerdmans Publishing Company
- Publication date: 2011
- Media type: Print (softcover), e-book
- Pages: 836 pp.
- ISBN: 978-0802864406

An Eerdmans Reader in Contemporary Political Theology is a 2011 anthology of writings on political theology published in the 20th and 21st centuries. Edited by William T. Cavanaugh, Jeffrey W. Bailey and Craig Hovey, the volume was designed as a class reader.

== Description ==
The premise of the collection is that the secularization thesis of Peter L. Berger—popularly expressed in Time magazine cover story "Is God Dead?"—was no longer true in the early years of the 21st century. "[T]heology, despite the hopes of some, never really went away; it simply masqueraded in other guises throughout modernity," the editors wrote in their introduction. "But that time is past. Theology is learning to speak to the public realm in its own voice once again." The editors' purpose was to compile contemporary perspectives on a wide range of issues in political theology, and—"with the locus of Christianity shifting to the global South"—include a range of texts beyond the Western canon, including writings from Africa, Asia and Latin America. The editors took Proverbs 29:18—"Without vision, the people perish"—as representing "the loci for thinking about political theology in a contemporary context," with vision representing the fundamental issues of life, people describing the purpose of theology and perish representing the durability of faith amid threats. The readings in the volume are organized into nine sections.

The first explores the political interpretation of the Bible, including liberation theology. Section I explores the matter of reading the Bible politically. Section two examines the relationship between liturgy and politics, while section three examines the implications of the Kingdom of God. The fourth section includes perspectives from American politics, including contrasting essays by H. Richard Niebuhr and Reinhold Niebuhr. The fifth section examines political theology "in the shadow of Auschwitz" and the wake of the Holocaust. Section six offers perspectives on the role of nonviolence in Christian political activism. The seventh section covers the dimensions of race and gender, including readings from black and feminist theologians, while section eight examines theology in the light of colonialism and post-colonial movements. The ninth section examines the church's role in politics, while readings the tenth section considers theories of political sovereignty. Finally, the eleventh section examines political theology post-9/11, with attention to moral clarity during wartime.

Notable contributors to the reader include:

- Karl Barth
- Richard Bauckham
- Dietrich Bonhoeffer
- Walter Brueggemann
- Ernesto Cardenal
- James H. Cone
- Dorothy Day
- Musa Dube
- Jean Bethke Elshtain
- Gustavo Gutiérrez
- Stanley Hauerwas
- George Hunsinger
- Ada Maria Isasi-Diaz
- Kim Yong-Bock
- Kosuke Koyama
- Kwok Pui-lan
- John Milbank
- John Courtney Murray
- Ched Myers
- H. Richard Niebuhr
- Reinhold Niebuhr
- Arvind P. Nirmal
- Oliver O'Donovan
- Catherine Pickstock
- Walter Rauschenbusch
- Joerg Rieger
- Christopher Rowland
- Rosemary Radford Ruether
- Alexander Schmemann
- Carl Schmitt
- Peter Manley Scott
- Jon Sobrino
- Dorothee Sölle
- R. S. Sugirtharajah
- Elsa Támez
- Mark Lewis Taylor
- Emilie Townes
- Desmond Tutu
- Graham Ward
- George Weigel
- Delores S. Williams
- Rowan Williams
- Walter Wink
- John Howard Yoder

== Reception ==
The reader was positively reviewed by academics, who praised its editors' introduction, the book's organizational structure and its diversity of perspectives—particularly for use in undergraduate and graduate classrooms.

Eddy Carder called the book "very readable and highly engaging not only for scholars and students but for anyone possessed by a sinceredesire to heighten his or her awareness concerning contemporary political theology." "For a course on political theology or as an introduction to the current state of the field, there is no finer work than this one", wrote David H. Jensen. Elizabeth Hinson-Hasty described it as a "gift to professors".

Carder suggested that the book "could have more effectively clarified" the definition of political theology, although Jensen praised the book's expansive concept of "any theology that offers a vision for people's flourishing in the polis." Among Hinson-Hasty's critiques were that the essays representing "people's resistance to the dehumanizing forces of colonialism, sexism, and racism" were primarily contained in two sections on race and gender and post-colonialism. "One must hope that the vision for the future is for perspectives from the Global South and other voices from grassroots resistance movements to be seen as more integrally related to the conversation and that these voices would be involved in establishing the framework for the field as a whole."
