= Alison Milbank =

British priest and literary scholar (born 1954)

The Reverend Canon Alison Milbank
- Born: Alison Grant Legg; 10 October 1954 (age 72)
- Spouse: John Milbank (m. 1978)
- Children: Sebastian Milbank

Academic background
- Education: Girton College, Cambridge; Lancaster University
- Thesis: Daughters of the House (1988)

Academic work
- Discipline: Religious studies
- Institutions: University of Manchester; University of Cambridge; Middlesex University; University of Virginia; University of Nottingham

Ecclesiastical career
- Religion: Christianity (Anglican)
- Church: Church of England
- Ordained: 2006 (deacon); 2007 (priest)
- Offices held: Canon Theologian of Southwell Minster (since 2017)

Alison Grant Milbank (née Legg; born 10 October 1954) is a British Anglican priest and literary scholar specialising in religion and culture. She is Canon Theologian at Southwell Minster and Professor of Theology and Literature at the University of Nottingham in its Department of Theology and Religious Studies.

== Early life and education ==
Milbank was born Alison Grant Legg on 10 October 1954. She studied theology and English literature at Girton College, Cambridge, graduating with a Bachelor of Arts (BA) degree in 1978; as per tradition, she proceeded to a Master of Arts (MA Cantab) degree in 1981. She undertook a year of teacher training with the University of Cambridge and completed her Postgraduate Certificate in Education (PGCE) in 1979. She then undertook postgraduate research at the University of Lancaster, completing her Doctor of Philosophy (PhD) degree in 1988.

== Career ==
=== Academic career ===
Milbank was the John Rylands Research Institute Fellow at the University of Manchester and, after temporary lectureships at Cambridge and the University of Middlesex, taught in the English department at the University of Virginia in the United States for five years. She joined the Department of Theology and Religious Studies, University of Nottingham, in September 2004. She was made an associate professor in 2008, and she has been Professor of Theology and Literature since 2022.

Milbank's research and teaching focuses on the relation of religion to culture in the post-Enlightenment period, with particular literary interest in non-realist literary and artistic expression, such as the Gothic, the fantastic, horror and fantasy. She has published a book on the Catholic poetics of J. R. R. Tolkien and G. K. Chesterton. She is currently working on a book which will trace the theological history of the emergence of the Gothic from the pre-Reformation period to the present day.

=== Ordained ministry ===
From 2005 to 2006, Milbank trained for ordained ministry on the East Midlands Ministry Training Course. She was ordained in the Church of England as a deacon in 2006 and as a priest in 2007. From 2006 to 2009, she served her curacy at Holy Trinity Church, Lambley, Nottinghamshire, as a non-stipendiary minister. From 2009 to 2017, she was a priest vicar at Southwell Minster. Since 2017, she has been canon theologian of Southwell Minster: she was installed as canon during a service at the cathedral on 15 October 2017.

== Personal life ==
In 1978, she married the theologian John Milbank. He is one of the principal exponents of radical orthodoxy. They have a son, Sebastian Milbank, who works as an editor for The Critic magazine.

== Selected works ==
- God and the Gothic: Religion, Romance and Reality in the English Literary Tradition, Oxford University Press, 2018. ISBN 978-0-19-882446-6
- Dante and the Victorians. Manchester University Press. 1998. ISBN 978-0-7190-3700-9.
- Chesterton and Tolkien as theologians: the fantasy of the real, T & T Clark, 2007, ISBN 978-0-567-04094-7
- Ann Ward Radcliffe (1995). Alison Milbank (ed.). The castles of Athlin and Dunbayne. Oxford University Press. ISBN 978-0-19-282357-1.
- Ann Ward Radcliffe (2008). Alison Milbank (ed.). A Sicilian Romance. Oxford University Press. ISBN 978-0-19-953739-6.
- Milbank, Alison (1992). Daughters of the House: modes of the gothic in Victorian fiction. Basingstoke: Macmillan. ISBN 978-0333566152.
- Alison Milbank, ed. (2007). Beating the traffic: Josephine Butler and Anglican social action on prostitution today. Winchester: George Mann. ISBN 978-0955241543.
- Milbank, Alison; Davison, Andrew (2010). For the Parish: a critique of fresh expressions. London: SCM Press. ISBN 978-0334043652.
