= John Milbank =

English Anglican philosopher (born 1952)

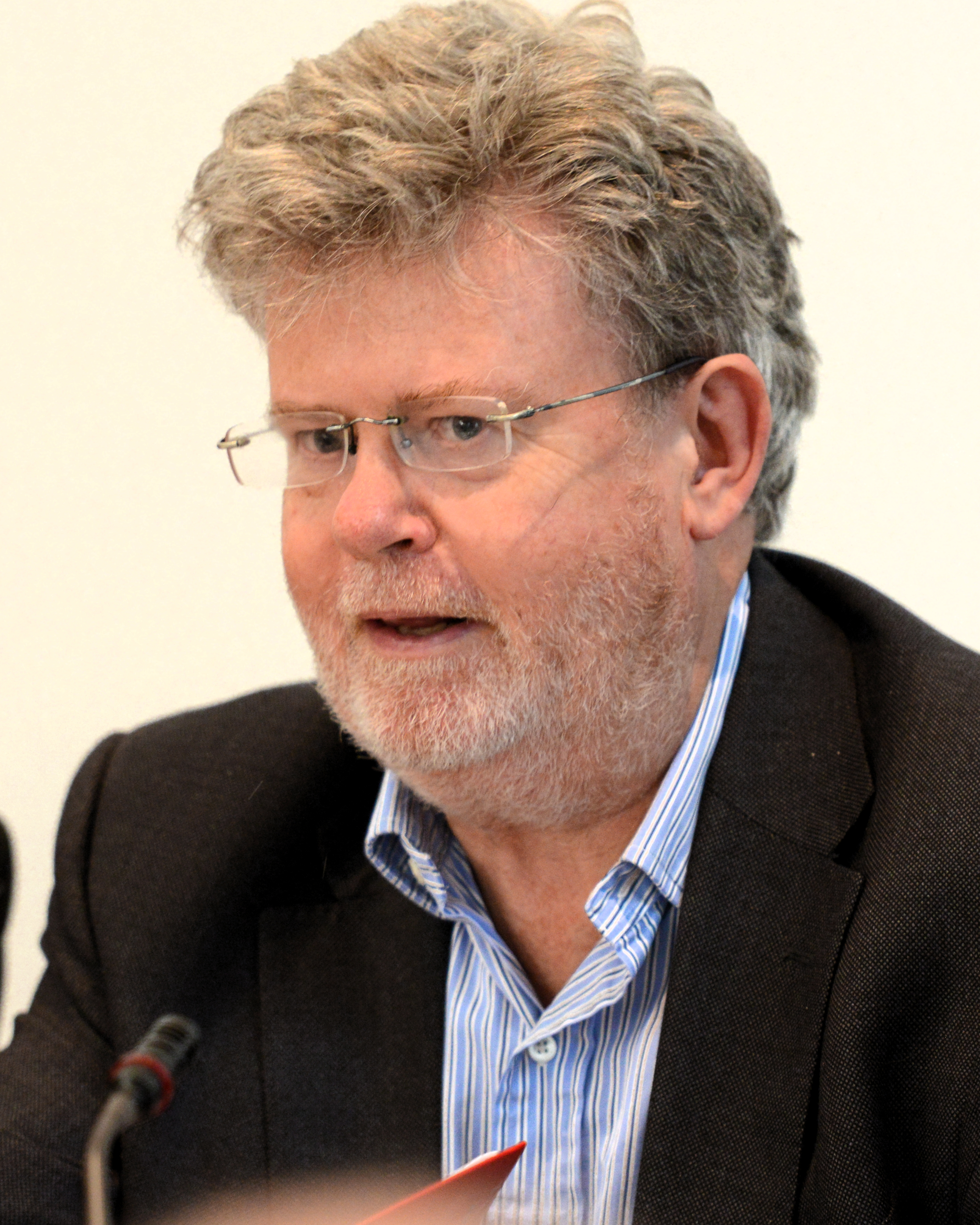
- Milbank in October 2014
- Born: Alasdair John Milbank; 23 October 1952 (age 73); Kings Langley, England
- Spouse: Alison Milbank (m. 1978)
- Children: Sebastian Milbank

Academic background
- Education: The Queen's College, Oxford; Westcott House, Cambridge; University of Birmingham
- Thesis: The Priority of the Made (1986)
- Doctoral advisor: Leon Pompa
- Influences: Thomas Aquinas; Augustine of Hippo; Hans Urs von Balthasar; Cambridge Platonists; V. A. Demant; Meister Eckhart; Neville Figgis; George Grant; Gregory of Nyssa; Johann Georg Hamann; Richard Hooker; Henri de Lubac; Nicholas of Cusa; Plato; Rowan Williams; Gillian Rose

Academic work
- Discipline: Theology, philosophy
- Sub-discipline: Philosophical theology; philosophy of social science; political philosophy; political theology; social theory
- School or tradition: Anglo-Catholicism; continental philosophy; postliberalism; postmodern philosophy; radical orthodoxy
- Institutions: Peterhouse, Cambridge; University of Nottingham
- Doctoral students: Phillip Blond; Peter Leithart; Catherine Pickstock; Aaron Riches
- Notable works: Theology and Social Theory (1990); Radical Orthodoxy (1999)
- Notable ideas: Radical orthodoxy
- Influenced: William T. Cavanaugh; David Bentley Hart; D. Stephen Long; Simon Oliver; Catherine Pickstock; James K. A. Smith

Alasdair John Milbank (born 23 October 1952) is a British theologian and philosopher. He is professor emeritus of Religion, Politics and Ethics at the University of Nottingham, where he is also president of the Centre of Theology and Philosophy and the Centre for Social Renewal. Milbank has previously taught at Lancaster University, University of Cambridge, and University of Virginia, where he held the Frances Myers Ball Chair of Philosophical Theology. While at Cambridge as a Reader, he was also fellow of Peterhouse.

Milbank founded the radical orthodoxy movement. His work crosses disciplinary boundaries, integrating subjects such as systematic theology, social theory, ethics, aesthetics, philosophy, political theory and political theology. He first gained recognition after publishing Theology and Social Theory in 1990, which laid the theoretical foundations for the movement which later became known as radical orthodoxy. He further developed the radical orthodoxy agenda in several works, including The Word made Strange, Being Reconciled, Truth in Aquinas (with Catherine Pickstock), The Suspended Middle and Beyond Secular Order.

== Life ==
=== Early life and education ===
Alasdair John Milbank was born in Kings Langley, England, on 23 October 1952. Following his secondary education at Hymers College, he received a Bachelor of Arts degree in modern history from The Queen's College, Oxford. He was awarded a postgraduate certificate in theology from Westcott House, Cambridge. During his time in Cambridge he studied under Rowan Williams. He then received his Doctor of Philosophy degree from the University of Birmingham. His dissertation on the work of Giambattista Vico, entitled "The Priority of the Made: The Religious Dimension in Vico's Thought", was written under the supervision of Leon Pompa. The University of Cambridge awarded him a senior Doctor of Divinity degree in recognition of published work in 1998.

He has delivered numerous lectures internationally, including the Stanton Lectures at the University of Cambridge, further contributing to contemporary theological discourse.

=== Personal life ===
Milbank married Alison Milbank, also professor emerita at the University of Nottingham, in 1978. They have a daughter, Reverend Dr Arabella Milbank Robinson, and a son, Dr Sebastian Milbank, beside two grandsons, Aubrey and Ivor Robinson, as well as a new granddaughter, Cora.

== Thought ==
A key part of the controversy surrounding Milbank concerns his view of the relationship between theology and the social sciences. He argues that the social sciences are a product of the modern ethos of secularism, which stems from an ontology of violence. At the same time Milbank seeks to show, genealogically, that much secular thought is actually composed of distorted and partial theologies, rendering its claims thereby not beyond the reach of orthodox theological assessment.Theology, therefore, should not seek to make constructive use of secular social theory, for theology itself offers a peaceable, comprehensive vision of all reality, extending to the social and political without the need for a social theory based on some level of violence. (As Contemporary Authors summarises his thought, "the Christian mythos alone 'is able to rescue virtue from deconstruction into violent, agonistic difference.'") Milbank argues that metaphysics is inescapable and therefore ought to be critically dealt with.

Milbank is sometimes described as a metaphysical theologian in that he is concerned with establishing a Christian trinitarian ontology. He relies heavily on aspects of the thought of Plato and Augustine, in particular the former's modification by the Neoplatonist philosophers. He is much influenced by Origen, Eriugena, Nicholas of Cusa, John Ruskin, Sergei Bulgakov and more recently, F. W. J. Schelling.

Milbank, together with Graham Ward and Catherine Pickstock, has helped forge a new trajectory in constructive theology known as radical orthodoxy – an ecumenically Catholic approach which is highly critical of existing modernity, but which seeks to disinter and develop a different, Renaissance and Romantic-based, Christian Platonic modernity. In his Cambridge Stanton lecture series, "Philosophy: A Theological Critique", he sought to extend his genealogical and critical approach to the social sciences to Philosophy as such. Characteristically, radical orthodoxy does not seek to restore foundational humanism questioned by postmodernism, but to argue that the postmodernist reading of ontological flux as uncertainty and nihilism is arbitrary. Instead radical orthodoxy reads flux in a revised Platonic way, as evidence of a stuttering, symbolic or linguistic participation of the finite in the Absolute. More recently, Milbank has accentuated his kinship with a post-postmodern speculative turn, while sympathising with spiritualists rather than materialists.

This was already exemplified in his debates with philosopher Slavoj Žižek, and in collaborations in three books (also with Creston Davis), entitled Theology and the Political: The New Debate (2005), The Monstrosity of Christ: Paradox or Dialectic (2009), and Paul's New Moment: Continental Philosophy and the Future of Christian Theology (2010). Milbank delivered the Stanton Lectures at Cambridge in 2011. Milbank's friendship and substantial intellectual common ground with David Bentley Hart has been noted several times by both thinkers. Milbank has also been a major influence on the formation of postliberal thought in contemporary politics, and especially upon the Blue Labour political faction. This aspect of his work is much linked to his philosophical reflections upon gift-exchange.

=== Reception ===
Theology and Social Theory is generally viewed as having brought about a paradigm shift in Anglo-Saxon theology towards a much more confidently Christian approach. While it was initially seen as extreme, this perception has faded over the years and Milbank's global influence has continued to increase.

Milbank's work has attracted both strong support and criticism. Supporters argue that his project of Radical Orthodoxy offers a compelling theological alternative to secular social theory.

== See also ==
- Theurgy

== Bibliography ==
=== Books ===
- Theology and Social Theory: Beyond Secular Reason, 1990 – (ISBN 0-631-18948-3)
- The Religious Dimension in the Thought of Giambattista Vico, 1668–1744, 2 vols., 1991–92 – (ISBN 0-7734-9694-7 [pt. 1], ISBN 0-7734-9215-1 [pt. 2])
- The Mercurial Wood: Sites, Tales, Qualities, 1997 – (ISBN 3-7052-0113-1)
- The Word Made Strange, 1997 – (ISBN 0-631-20336-2)
- Truth in Aquinas, with Catherine Pickstock, 2000 – (ISBN 0-415-23335-6)
- Being Reconciled: Ontology and Pardon, 2003 – (ISBN 0-415-30525-X)
- Introducing Radical Orthodoxy: Mapping a Post-Secular Theology, Jan. 2004, Baker Publishing Group - ISBN 978-0-8010-2735-2
- The Suspended Middle: Henri de Lubac and the Debate Concerning the Supernatural, 2005 – (ISBN 0-8028-2899-X)
- The Legend of Death: Two Poetic Sequences, 2008 – (ISBN 978-1-55635-915-6)
- The Monstrosity of Christ: Paradox or Dialectic?, With Slavoj Žižek and Creston Davis, 2009 – (ISBN 978-0-262-01271-3)
- Veritas: Proposing Theology. S C M Press, Limited, 2009. ISBN 978-0-334-04159-7
- The Future of Love: Essays in Political Theology, 2009 – (ISBN 978-1-60608-162-4)
- Paul's New Moment: Continental Philosophy and the Future of Christian Theology, With Slavoj Žižek and Creston Davis, 2010 – (ISBN 978-1-58743-227-9)
- Beyond Secular Order: The Representation of Being and the Representation of the People, 2013 – (ISBN 978-1-118-82529-7)
- The Dances of Albion: A Poetic Topography, Shearsman Books, 2015. ISBN 978-1-84861-395-9
- The Politics of Virtue: Post-Liberalism and the Human Future, With Adrian Pabst, 2016 – (ISBN 978-1-78348-649-6)
- Philosophy: A Theological Critique, Feb. 2023 Wiley–Blackwell. ISBN 978-1-4051-8239-3
- The Gift Exchanged: The Gift in Religion. Wiley–Blackwell Jun. 2017 ISBN 978-1-4051-5484-0
- Some Speaking Swirls: July 2023, Shearsman Books, ISBN 978-1-84861-893-0

=== Essays in edited volumes ===
- "Postmodern Critical Augustinianism: A Short Summa in Forty-two Responses to Unasked Questions", found in The Postmodern God: A Theological Reader, edited by Graham Ward, 1997 – (ISBN 0-631-20141-6)
- "The Last of the Last: Theology in the Church", found in Conflicting Allegiances: The Church-Based University in a Liberal Democratic Society, 2004 – (ISBN 1-58743-063-0)
- "Alternative Protestantism: Radical Orthodoxy and the Reformed Tradition", found in Radical Orthodoxy and the Reformed Tradition: Creation, Covenant, And Participation, 2005 – (ISBN 0-8010-2756-X)
- "Plato versus Levinas: Gift, Relation and Participation", found in Adam Lipszyc, ed., Emmanuel Levinas: Philosophy, Theology, Politics (Warsaw: Adam Mickiewicz Institute, 2006), 130–144.
- "Sophiology and Theurgy: The New Theological Horizon", found in Adrian Pabst, ed., Radical Orthodoxy and Eastern Orthodoxy (Basingstoke: Ashgate, 2009), 45–85 – (ISBN 978-0-7546-6091-0)
- "Shari'a and the True Basis of Group Rights: Islam, the West, and Liberalism", found in Shari'a in the West, edited by Rex Ahdar and Nicholas Aroney, 2010 – (ISBN 978-0-19-958291-4)
- "Platonism and Christianity: East and West", found in Daniel Haynes, ed., New Perspectives on Maximus (forthcoming)

=== Journal articles ===
- "The Body by Love Possessed: Christianity and Late Capitalism in Britain", Modern Theology 3, no. 1 (October 1986): 35–65.
- "Enclaves, or Where is the Church?", New Blackfriars, Vol. 73, no. 861 (June,1992), pp. 341–352.
- "Can a Gift Be Given? Prolegomena to a Future Trinitarian Metaphysic", Modern Theology 11, no. 1 (January 1995): 119–161.
- "The Soul of Reciprocity Part One: Reciprocity Refused", Modern Theology 17, no. 3 (July 2001): 335–391.
- "The Soul of Reciprocity Part Two: Reciprocity Granted", Modern Theology 17, no. 4 (October 2001): 485–507.
- "Scholasticism, Modernism and Modernity", Modern Theology 22, no. 4 (October 2006): 651–671.
- "From Sovereignty to Gift: Augustine's Critique of Interiority", Polygraph 19 no. 20 (2008): 177–199.
- "The New Divide: Romantic versus Classical Orthodoxy Modern Theology", Modern Theology 26, no. 1 (January 2010): 26–38.
- "Culture and Justice", Theory, Culture and Society 27, no. 6 (2010): 107–124.
- "On 'Thomistic Kabbalah'", Modern Theology 27, no. 1 (2011): 147–185.
- Milbank, John (January 2011). "On "Thomistic Kabbalah"". Modern Theology. 27 (1): 147–185. doi:10.1111/j.1468-0025.2010.01659.x.
- "Hume Versus Kant: Faith, Reason and Feeling", Modern Theology 27, no. 2 (April 2011): 276–297.
- "Against Human Rights: Liberty in the Western Tradition", Oxford Journal of Law and Religion 1, no. 1 (2012): 203–234.
- "Dignity Rather than Right", Revista de filosofía Open Insight, v. IV, no. 7 (January 2014): 77–124.
- "Politics of the Soul", Revista de filosofía Open Insight, v. VI, no. 9 (January–June 2015): 91–108.
- "Reformation 500: Any Cause for Celebration?", "Open Theology" v. 4 (2018): 607–729. Open Access. DOI: Reformation 500: Any Cause for Celebration?
- "Officially Sanctioned Catholic Kabbalah? | Church Life Journal | University of Notre Dame". churchlifejournal.nd.edu. 7 August 2019. Archived from the original on 25 January 2022.
