= Todd Hunter (bishop) =

American author, church planter and Anglican bishop

The Right Reverend Todd D. Hunter
- Bishop of the Diocese of Churches for the Sake of Others
- Church: Anglican Church in North America
- Diocese: Diocese of Churches for the Sake of Others
- In office: 2013–2025
- Successor: Jeff Bailey

Orders
- Ordination: October 25, 2008 (diaconal) by The Rt. Rev. Philip Jones
- Consecration: September 9, 2009 by The Most Rev. Emmanuel Kolini

Personal details
- Born: 1956 (age 69–70)

Todd Dean Hunter (born 1956) is an American author, church planter, and Anglican bishop known for his leadership across evangelical, charismatic, and Anglican contexts. He served as the founding diocesan bishop of the Diocese of Churches for the Sake of Others (C4SO), a non-geographical diocese oriented toward church planting and clergy formation, in the Anglican Church in North America (ACNA) from its admission in 2013 until his retirement in 2025. Prior to his Anglican ministry, Hunter was a senior leader in the Association of Vineyard Churches and served as executive director of Alpha USA, the American affiliate of the Alpha course. He is the author of several books addressing Christian discipleship, leadership, ecclesiology, and spiritual formation.

== Early life and education ==
Hunter was converted to Christianity in 1976 during the Jesus Movement. He earned a Bachelor of Science in business administration from California State Polytechnic University, Pomona. He later completed a Master of Arts in Biblical Studies at Regent University.

In 2006, Hunter was awarded a Doctor of Ministry (D.Min.) degree from Portland Seminary of George Fox University. His doctoral dissertation, Re-Hearing the Gospel: Toward New Practices for Evangelism and Discipleship, examined contemporary approaches to evangelism and formation and is archived in the university’s institutional repository.

== Vineyard movement and early ministry ==
In 1979, Hunter and his wife, Debbie Hunter, moved to Wheeling, West Virginia, where he planted a church affiliated with Calvary Chapel. The congregation later became part of the Vineyard movement. In 1987, Hunter was invited by John Wimber to serve as a senior associate pastor at Anaheim Vineyard Christian Fellowship and to assist in the early development of the Association of Vineyard Churches.

From 1991 to 1994, Hunter oversaw Vineyard churches in the southeastern United States. He returned to Southern California in 1994 as national coordinator of the Vineyard. Following Wimber’s death in 1997, Hunter served for four years as president of the Vineyard movement, during a period of organizational consolidation and growth within the denomination.

== Church planting and evangelical leadership ==
From 2001 to 2004, Hunter worked with Allelon, a church-planting coaching ministry. From 2004 to 2008, he served as executive director of Alpha USA, overseeing the American expansion of the Alpha course, an evangelistic program originally developed within the Church of England.

During this period, Hunter also taught as an adjunct instructor at several seminaries and universities, including Fuller Theological Seminary, George Fox University, and Wheaton College.

== Anglican ministry and C4SO ==
Hunter’s transition into Anglicanism marked a shift toward building ecclesial structures intended to integrate evangelical mission, charismatic spirituality, and sacramental theology within a common Anglican framework.

In 2008, Hunter founded Churches for the Sake of Others (C4SO) as a church-planting initiative affiliated with the Anglican Mission in the Americas (AMiA). He was ordained as an Anglican deacon in 2008 and as a priest in 2009.

On September 9, 2009, Hunter was consecrated a bishop in AMiA by Archbishop Emmanuel Kolini of Rwanda; Rick Warren preached at the consecration service.

In late 2011, Hunter was among several AMiA bishops who resigned from Rwandan oversight following a dispute between AMiA leadership, including its chair Chuck Murphy, and Archbishop Onesphore Rwaje of Rwanda.

In 2012, Hunter was received into the Anglican Church in North America. In connection with this transition, he publicly expressed regret over his role in the AMiA dispute and stated that he had sought and received forgiveness from Archbishop Rwaje for actions and communications he acknowledged as hurtful.

C4SO was formally admitted as a non-geographical diocese of the ACNA at the Provincial Council in June 2013, with Hunter serving as its founding diocesan bishop. Under his leadership, the diocese developed around five articulated core values—Kingdom, Spirit, Formation, Mission, and Sacrament—which shaped its approach to church planting, clergy formation, and liturgical practice. C4SO emphasized contextualized Anglican worship, combining evangelical discipleship, charismatic spirituality, and sacramental theology within a shared ecclesial framework.

== Theological influences ==
In interviews and published reflections, Hunter has cited the influence of several theologians and church leaders on his approach to ministry and formation. He has identified the philosopher and spiritual theologian Dallas Willard as a formative influence on his understanding of discipleship and spiritual formation, along with Anglican New Testament scholar N. T. Wright and pastor–theologian Eugene Peterson for their emphasis on Scripture, ecclesiology, and the integration of theology and pastoral practice. Hunter has also acknowledged the continuing influence of John Wimber, under whom he served during his years in the Vineyard movement, particularly in shaping his openness to charismatic spirituality within an ecclesial framework.

== Retirement and succession ==
In April 2025, the Diocese of Churches for the Sake of Others elected the Jeff Bailey as bishop coadjutor. Following Bailey’s election, Hunter announced that he would retire upon Bailey’s consecration rather than serve alongside him for a transition period. Bailey was consecrated and installed as diocesan bishop on September 27, 2025, at which time Hunter concluded his episcopal tenure.

== Other initiatives ==
In 2021, Hunter founded the Center for Formation, Justice and Peace, an interdenominational organization focused on spiritual formation and public engagement. The center describes its mission as cultivating Christlike character oriented toward justice, reconciliation, and peace through teaching, dialogue, and community formation.

== Published works ==
- Giving Church Another Chance: Finding New Meaning in Spiritual Practices (InterVarsity Press, 2010)
- Christianity Beyond Belief: Following Jesus for the Sake of Others (InterVarsity Press, 2010)
- The Accidental Anglican: The Surprising Appeal of the Liturgical Church (InterVarsity Press, 2010)
- Our Favorite Sins: The Sins We Commit and How You Can Quit (Thomas Nelson, 2012)
- Our Character at Work: Success from the Heart of Servant Leadership (Wheatmark, 2016)
- Deep Peace: Finding Calm in a World of Conflict and Anxiety (Zondervan, 2021)
- What Jesus Intended: Finding True Faith in the Rubble of Bad Religion (InterVarsity Press, 2023)

Religious titles
New title	Bishop of C4SO; 2013–2025	Succeeded by Jeff Bailey
