= Simon Oliver (priest) =

British Anglican priest and theologian (born 1971)

The Reverend Canon Simon Oliver
- Born: Simon Andrew Oliver; 2 October 1971 (age 55)
- Title: Van Mildert Professor of Divinity

Academic background
- Education: Mansfield College, Oxford; Westcott House, Cambridge; Peterhouse, Cambridge
- Thesis: The God of Motion (2003)
- Doctoral advisor: Catherine Pickstock
- Influences: John Milbank; Catherine Pickstock; John Webster

Academic work
- Discipline: Theology
- Sub-discipline: Philosophical theology; systematic theology
- School or tradition: Radical orthodoxy
- Institutions: University of Wales, Lampeter; University of Nottingham; Durham University

Ecclesiastical career
- Religion: Christianity (Anglican)
- Church: Church of England
- Ordained: 1998 (deacon); 1999 (priest)
- Offices held: Canon Theologian of Southwell Minster (2011–2015); Residentiary Canon of Durham Cathedral (2015–present)

Simon Andrew Oliver (born 2 October 1971) is a British Anglican priest and theologian. Formerly Associate Professor of Philosophical Theology at the University of Nottingham, he is now the Van Mildert Professor of Divinity at the University of Durham. Oliver is also on staff with the Centre of Theology and Philosophy.

== Early life and education ==
Oliver was born on 2 October 1971. He studied philosophy, politics and economics at Mansfield College, Oxford, graduating with a Bachelor of Arts (BA) degree in 1993; as per tradition, his BA was promoted to a Master of Arts (MA Oxon) degree in 1998. In 1995, he matriculated into Westcott House, Cambridge, an Anglican theological college in the Liberal Catholic tradition, to train for Holy Orders. During this time, he also studied theology at Peterhouse, Cambridge, graduating with a further BA degree in 1997; as per tradition, his BA was promoted to a Master of Arts (MA Cantab) degree in 2000.

Having left theological college in 1998, Oliver continued his studies, undertaking postgraduate studies at Peterhouse. His doctoral supervisor was Catherine Pickstock, and his doctoral thesis was titled The God of Motion: Theological Physics from Plato to Newton with a Particular Emphasis on the Work of St. Thomas Aquinas. He completed his Doctor of Philosophy (PhD) degree in 2003.

== Ordained ministry and academic career ==
Oliver was ordained in the Church of England as a deacon in 1998 and as a priest in 1999 for the Diocese of Ely. From 1998 to 2001, he served his curacy as a non-stipendiary minister at All Saints, Teversham and St Andrew's Church, Cherry Hinton. From 2001 to 2004, he was the chaplain of Hertford College, Oxford. In 2005, he joined the University of Wales, Lampeter, as a lecturer in theology. He was promoted to senior lecturer in 2006.

In 2009, Oliver moved to the University of Nottingham, where he had been appointed associate professor of philosophical theology. In November 2010, it was announced that he had been additionally appointed Canon Theologian of Southwell Minster; he was installed during a service at the minster on 13 February 2011. He became head of the Department of Theology and Religious Studies at Nottingham in 2013.

In February 2015, it was announced that Oliver would be the next Van Mildert Professor of Divinity at the University of Durham. He moved to Durham to take up the appointment in September 2015. As such, he also became a residentiary canon of Durham Cathedral, and was installed during Evensong on 20 September 2015. He gave the 2017 Stanton Lectures at the University of Cambridge; the series was titled "Creation's Ends: Teleology, Ethics and the Natural".

=== Views ===
Oliver is a notable member of the theological sensibility known as radical orthodoxy. He organised the 2013 Centre for Theology and Philosophy conference: The Soul, held at St Anne's College, Oxford.

== Personal life ==
Oliver is married and has two sons.

== Selected works ==
- Oliver, Simon (2005). Philosophy, God and Motion. London: Routledge. ISBN 978-0415360456.
- Oliver, Simon; Warrier, Maya, eds. (2008). Theology and Religious Studies: An Exploration of Disciplinary Boundaries. London: T & T Clark. ISBN 978-0567032362.
- Milbank, John; Oliver, Simon, eds. (2008). The Radical Orthodoxy Reader. London: Routledge. ISBN 978-0415425124.
- Oliver, Simon; Kilby, Karen; O'Loughlin, Tom, eds. (2012). Faithful Reading: New Essays in Theology in Honour of Fergus Kerr, OP. London: T & T Clark. ISBN 978-0567644039.

Academic offices
Preceded by Mark McIntosh	Van Mildert Professor of Divinity; 2015–present	Incumbent
