= Brian Wallace =

American Anglican bishop

The Right Reverend Brian Wallace
- Bishop Suffragan of Churches for the Sake of Others
- Church: Anglican Church in North America
- Diocese: C4SO

Orders
- Ordination: 2017 (priesthood)
- Consecration: September 9, 2023 by Foley Beach

Personal details
- Born: 1962 (age 63–64)

Brian Morse Wallace (born 1962) is an American Anglican bishop. Consecrated in 2023, he serves as the first bishop suffragan in the Diocese of Churches for the Sake of Others in the Anglican Church in North America.

== Biography ==
Wallace graduated from Hampden–Sydney College and married his wife, Lisa, in 1985. They have three sons and, as of 2024, five grandchildren. After being involved with InterVarsity Christian Fellowship at Hampden-Sydney, Wallace spent 19 years on staff with InterVarsity in North Carolina and Texas, serving as regional director for Texas, Oklahoma and Arkansas.

After leaving InterVarsity, Wallace spent 11 years in pastoral ministry in evangelical churches in Austin, Texas. He obtained a master's degree and a doctorate in missiology from Fuller Theological Seminary. In 2015, he became executive director of the Fuller Center for Spiritual Formation at Fuller Seminary, where he developed Fuller Formation Groups, a program that matched Fuller resources with cohorts of local church members.

In 2017, Wallace was received into the Anglican Church in North America, and in 2023, Wallace was elected to serve as bishop suffragan in the ACNA's Diocese of Churches for the Sake of Others. Archbishop Foley Beach consecrated him to the episcopate on September 9, 2023, at Trinity Anglican Church in Atlanta.
