= Graham Ward (theologian) =

English theologian and Anglican priest (born 1955)

The Reverend Canon Graham Ward
- Born: Graham John Ward; 25 October 1955 (age 70); Manchester, England
- Title: Regius Professor of Divinity (2012-2024)

Ecclesiastical career
- Religion: Christianity (Anglican)
- Church: Church of England
- Ordained: 1990 (deacon); 1991 (priest)

Academic background
- Education: Fitzwilliam College, Cambridge; Selwyn College, Cambridge
- Influences: Thomas Aquinas; Augustine of Hippo; Jacques Derrida

Academic work
- Discipline: Theology
- School or tradition: Radical orthodoxy; postmodernism
- Institutions: Exeter College, Oxford; Peterhouse, Cambridge; University of Manchester; Christ Church, Oxford
- Influenced: Simon Oliver

Graham John Ward (born 25 October 1955) is an English theologian and Anglican priest who was Regius Professor of Divinity at the University of Oxford from 2012 to 2024.

== Early life ==
Ward was educated at Salford Grammar School and Fitzwilliam College, Cambridge, where he studied English and French literature, and then at Selwyn College, Cambridge, where he studied theology while training for ordination at Westcott House.

== Career ==
Ward was successively a chaplain and fellow at Exeter College, Oxford, a part-time lecturer at the University of Birmingham, and Dean and Director of Studies for Theology at Peterhouse, Cambridge. He was ordained deacon in 1990 and a priest of the Church of England in 1991.

He transferred his teaching career to the University of Manchester, where he was Senior Fellow in Religion and Gender (1997–98), then Samuel Ferguson Professor of Contextual Theology and Ethics (1998–2009).

In 2012 he was appointed as Regius Professor of Divinity at the University of Oxford, in which capacity he is ex officio a member of the College of Canons and the cathedral chapter of Christ Church, Oxford.

Ward has engaged in different fields of theology, especially postmodern theology, and other disciplines such as philosophy, psychoanalysis, gender studies, and queer theory. He has written on the theology of language, postmodernism, cultural analysis, and christology. His contemporary research focuses on Christian social ethics, political theory and cultural hermeneutics. He is editor of three book series: Radical Orthodoxy (Routledge), Christian Theology in Context (OUP) and Illuminations: Religion & Theory (Blackwell).

== Views ==
In Cities of God (2000), Ward declared his support for same-sex relationships:

... I am a male, Christian theologian who openly advocates same-sex unions, who has friends dying or living with the fear of AIDS, and a family who lives the shadows, embarrassments and sufferings of a genetic disorder. But each of us moves out from where we are placed and place ourselves, and in doing so understands that we are also elsewhere.

== Books and edited volumes ==
=== Authored ===
- Another Kind of Normal: Ethical Life II (Oxford University Press, 2022), ISBN 9780192843012
- Theology and Religion: Why It Matters (Polity, 2019), ISBN 9781509529698
- Unimaginable: What We Imagine and What We Can't (I.B.Tauris & Co Ltd, 2018) ISBN 9781784537579
- How the Light Gets In: Ethical Life I (Oxford University Press, 2016), ISBN 9780199297658
- Unbelievable: Why We Believe and Why We Don't (I.B.Tauris & Co Ltd, 2014), ISBN 9781780767352
- The Politics of Discipleship: Becoming Postmaterial Citizens (SCM Press, 2009), ISBN 9780334043508
- Christ and Culture (Blackwell, 2005), ISBN 9781405121408
- Cultural Transformation and Religious Practice (Cambridge University Press, 2004), ISBN 9780521540742
- True Religion (Blackwell, 2002), ISBN 9780631221746
- Cities of God (Routledge, 2000), ISBN 9780415202565
- Theology and Contemporary Critical Theory (Macmillan, 1996, 2nd edition 2000), ISBN 9781596930223
- Barth, Derrida and the Language of Theology (Cambridge University Press, 1995), ISBN 9780521657082

=== Edited ===
- (Edited, with Michael Hoelzl) Religion and Political Thought (Continuum, 2006), ISBN 9780826480057
- (Edited) The Blackwell Companion to Postmodern Theology (Blackwell, 2004), ISBN 9781405127196
- (Edited) The Certeau Reader (2000), ISBN 9780631212799
- (Edited) Theology and Masculinity (The Journal of Men's Studies, Vol. 7, 1999)
- (Edited, with John Milbank and Catherine Pickstock) Radical Orthodoxy: a New Theology (Routledge, 1998), ISBN 9780415196994
- (Edited) The Postmodern God: a Theological Reader (Blackwell, 1997), ISBN 9780631201410

== See also ==
- Ward has additionally rejected pantheism, pandeism and process thought.
- The City of God (Augustine)

Academic offices
Preceded by Marilyn McCord Adams	Regius Professor of Divinity at the University of Oxford; 2012–2024	Succeeded by Andrew Davison
