= D. Stephen Long =

American Christian theologian (born 1960)

- Born: Duane Stephen Long; January 31, 1960 (age 66)
- Spouse: Ricka Long

Academic background
- Education: Taylor University; Duke University
- Thesis: Whittling Off the Rough Edges (1990)

Academic work
- Discipline: Theology
- Sub-discipline: Christian ethics; political theology; systematic theology
- School or tradition: Thomism
- Institutions: Saint Joseph's University; Garrett-Evangelical Theological Seminary; Marquette University; Southern Methodist University

Duane Stephen Long (born January 31, 1960), also known as D. Stephen Long, is an American Christian theologian who is the Cary M. Maguire University Professor of Ethics at Southern Methodist University. Previously, Long was Professor of Systematic Theology at Marquette University. He specializes in systematic theology, Christian ethics, and political theology.

His books include The Divine Economy: Theology and Market, which details a Christian approach to economics based in the thought of radical orthodoxy; The Goodness of God: Theology, Church and Social Order; and Christian Ethics: A Very Short Introduction.
