= Vintage Church =

Multi-site Anglican church in Los Angeles, California, US

- Vintage Church
- 34.0255°N 118.4942°W
- Location: Los Angeles, California
- Country: United States
- Denomination: Anglican Church in North America
- Churchmanship: Charismatic
- Website: vintagechurchla.com

History
- Former name: Trinity Baptist Church
- Founded: 2011
- Dedicated: November 26, 1950

Architecture
- Architect: William Woollett
- Style: Spanish Colonial Revival
- Completed: 1950
- Construction cost: $300,000 ($4.01 million in 2025)

Specifications
- Capacity: 600
- Length: 135 feet (41 m)
- Width: 56 feet (17 m)
- Height: 87 feet (27 m) (tower)
- Materials: Stucco

Administration
- Diocese: C4SO

Clergy
- Rector: Ger Jones

Vintage Church is a multi-site Anglican megachurch in Los Angeles, California. Founded in 2011 by Ger Jones as part of the HTB network, the church has grown to 3,000 in average attendance and has sites in Santa Monica and El Segundo. Vintage Church has also planted churches in Malibu and Pasadena. The church, which represents the charismatic tradition within Anglicanism, is the largest congregation in the Anglican Church in North America. Vintage Church is known for offering the Alpha course, an evangelistic introduction to Christianity.

Vintage's Santa Monica campus was originally built by Trinity Baptist Church in 1950. As Trinity Baptist dwindled in membership, its members offered to merge into Vintage Church, providing Vintage with a 600-seat sanctuary and space for classrooms and offices. The Santa Monica campus has since been renovated and expanded.

== History ==
Trinity Baptist Church's presence at 1015 California Avenue dates to 1925. The church began construction on a new sanctuary designed by William Woollett in 1948. Volunteers from the church worked to complete a new frame and stucco sanctuary measuring 135 feet (41 m) by 56 feet (17 m). The $300,000 ($4.01 million in 2025) Santa Monica building at 1015 California Avenue was dedicated in 1950. The Spanish Colonial Revival building seated nearly 1,000 people at the time. In 1951, neighbors complained to Santa Monica city officials about the volume of the chimes in the carillon of Trinity's 87-foot (27 m) tower.

Vintage Church was planted in 2011 by English pastor Ger Jones through the Holy Trinity Brompton church planting network. Vintage moved to University High School in West Los Angeles in 2012.

By 2015, Trinity Baptist's congregation had dwindled and its members decided not to hire a new pastor after their previous pastor retired. Instead, they merged into Vintage Church, providing Vintage with Trinity's then-600-seat sanctuary, with 30 classrooms and an onsite preschool facility. Vintage held its first services there on Easter Sunday 2015. In 2020, Vintage consolidated its West L.A. locations at its Santa Monica campus.

In 2023, following substantial growth, Vintage L.A. conducted a $7.5 million capital campaign to renovate the Santa Monica campus. The congregation launched a campus in El Segundo in 2024. That year, Vintage Church reported an average Sunday attendance of 3,000 across its five services in two locations. It was the largest church in the Anglican Church in North America.

== Activities ==
Vintage Church has been described as a megachurch representing the charismatic tradition within Anglicanism. The church has offered the Alpha course, a program developed at Holy Trinity Brompton, since 2013. By 2019, Vintage Church was seeing 450 people per Alpha session. Jones said Vintage designed its Alpha offering to be "an Instagram-able environment" and that the church holds its Alpha sessions in a pub that was specially built in the church building.

During and after the 2025 Palisades Fire, Vintage Church established a wildfire relief fund.

== Vintage Church network ==
Vintage Church has planted multiple churches in the Los Angeles area, including Vintage Church Malibu in 2017 and Vintage Church Pasadena in 2019. In 2026, Vintage Church Malibu renamed itself TableChurch Malibu and disaffiliated from the Vintage Church network. Vintage Church Pasadena meets in Pasadena's former First Congregational Church.

Separate from the Vintage Church network, Vintage Church has supported other church plants in its ACNA diocese, Churches for the Sake of Others.
