= Maxwell Upson =

American educationalist (1876–1969)

Maxwell Mayhew Upson (1876 – 1969) was an American educationalist, who was member of the Cornell University Board of Trustees for over 35 years.

== Biography ==
Born in 1876, Upson graduated in 1899 from Cornell with a bachelor's degree in engineering. Upson was elected to the Sphinx Head Society as a senior. Upson's research contributed to the development of prestressed concrete.

He was awarded the Edward Longstreth Medal from the Franklin Institute in 1940.

At the bequest of his widow, Upson is the namesake of Upson Hall on the Cornell campus. The building originally cost $1,988,083 and was designed by the architects Perkins and Will of Chicago and was finished in 1958. The building houses the Departments of Computer Science and Mechanical and Aerospace Engineering. A professorship named for him at Princeton Theological Seminary is currently held by Mark Lewis Taylor.
