= Mark McIntosh =

American Episcopal priest and theologian (1960–2021)

The Reverend Mark McIntosh
- Born: Mark Allen McIntosh; February 2, 1960; Evanston, Illinois, US
- Died: October 13, 2021 (aged 61)
- Spouse: Anne Nagle McIntosh

Ecclesiastical career
- Religion: Christianity (Anglican)
- Church: Episcopal Church (United States); Church of England
- Ordained: 1986 (priest)

Academic background
- Education: Yale University; University of Oxford; General Theological Seminary; University of Chicago
- Thesis: The Doctrine of the Incarnation in Hans Urs von Balthasar (1993)
- Doctoral advisor: David Tracy

Academic work
- Discipline: Theology
- Sub-discipline: Ascetical theology; historical theology; moral theology; mystical theology; philosophical theology; systematic theology
- Institutions: Loyola University Chicago; Durham University
- Main interests: Christian mysticism

Mark Allen McIntosh (February 2, 1960—October 13, 2021) was an American Episcopal priest and theologian. He specialized in systematic theology, historical theology, and the history of Christian spirituality, engaging especially with Christian mysticism. From 2014 until his death, he was Professor of Christian Spirituality at Loyola University Chicago. He was previously, from 2009 to 2014, the Van Mildert Professor of Divinity at Durham University and a Canon Residentiary of Durham Cathedral.

== Early life and education ==
McIntosh was born on 2 February 1960 in Evanston, Illinois, United States. He studied history at Yale University, writing his senior thesis under the supervision of the Christian historian Jaroslav Pelikan, and graduating magna cum laude with a Bachelor of Arts (BA) degree in 1982. He then moved to England where he trained for holy orders at St Stephen's House, Oxford, an Anglo-Catholic theological college, and studied theology at the University of Oxford. He graduated with a further BA degree in theology 1985. He then returned to the United States to study at the General Theological Seminary, a seminary of the Episcopal Church in New York City; he completed a Master of Divinity (M.Div.) degree in 1986. Studying with several experts in systematic and mystical theology, including Bernard McGinn, he completed his Ph.D. in 1993 at the University of Chicago, where he focused on the mystical aspects of Hans Urs von Balthasar's Christology.

== Career ==
In December 1986, McIntosh was ordained in the Episcopal Church (United States) as a priest by Frank T. Griswold for the Diocese of Chicago. From 1986 to 1989, he served as an assistant to the Dean of St James Cathedral, Chicago, Illinois, and from 2003 to 2006, served as canon theologian to Frank T. Griswold during his tenure as 25th Presiding Bishop and Primate of the Episcopal Church.

=== Theology ===
McIntosh was well known in the sphere of systematic theology, and especially on Christian mysticism. Looking at the works of Balthasar or Bonaventure, C. S. Lewis or Maximus the Confessor, McIntosh provided in his publications a study of many great theologians in order to reveal the underlying ideas, and adding to them with original and masterful thought. Drawing on themes that begin with the pre-Christian thinkers Plato and Plotinus, McIntosh threaded together the mystical, philosophical, and epistemological traditions of centuries of Christian thought, assembling an impressive corpus of new interpretations as well as his own theological contributions.

Latterly, he taught and researched for projects involving the Divine Ideas, or exemplar forms – their relatively unrecognized but crucial place in Christian theology.

== Selected works ==
- McIntosh, Mark A. (1996). Christology from Within: Spirituality and the Incarnation in Hans Urs von Balthasar. Notre Dame, Indiana: University of Notre Dame Press. ISBN 978-0268008154.
- McIntosh, Mark A. (1998). Mystical Theology: Integrity of Spirituality and Theology. Oxford: Wiley-Blackwell. ISBN 978-1557869067.
- McIntosh, Mark A. (2000). Mysteries of Faith. Cambridge, Massachusetts: Cowley Publications. ISBN 978-1561011759.
- McIntosh, Mark A. (2004). Discernment and Truth: The Spirituality and Theology of Knowledge. New York: Independent Publishers Group. ISBN 978-0824521387.
- McIntosh, Mark A. (2007). Divine Teaching: An Introduction to Christian Theology. Oxford: Wiley-Blackwell. ISBN 978-1405102711.
- Howells, Edward and McIntosh, Mark A. and (2020), eds. The Oxford Handbook of Mystical Theology. Oxford University Press. ISBN 9780198722380
- McIntosh, Mark A. (2021). The Divine Ideas Tradition in Christian Mystical Theology. Oxford: Oxford University Press. ISBN 978-0199580811.
- McIntosh, Mark A. and Griswold, Frank T. (May 2022). Seeds of Faith: Theology and Spirituality at the Heart of Christian Belief. Wm. B. Eerdmans Publishing Co. ISBN 9780802879738
- McIntosh, Mark A. and Griswold, Frank T. (May 2022). Harvest of Hope: A Contemplative Approach to Holy Scripture. Wm. B. Eerdmans Publishing Co. ISBN 9780802879721

Academic offices
Preceded by David Brown	Van Mildert Professor of Divinity; 2009–2014	Succeeded by Simon Oliver
