= Jeff Bailey (bishop) =

American Anglican bishop, consultant, and academic

The Right Reverend Jeff Bailey
- Bishop of Churches for the Sake of Others
- Church: Anglican Church in North America
- Diocese: Churches for the Sake of Others
- In office: 2025–present
- Predecessor: Todd Hunter
- Other posts: Canon for Leadership Development, Diocese of Christ Our Hope (2019–2025)

Orders
- Consecration: September 27, 2025 by Steve Wood

Personal details
- Born: 1968 (age 57–58)
- Spouse: Alicia Bailey
- Children: 3
- Education: Duke Divinity School (Th.M.); University of Cambridge (Ph.D.)

Jeffrey W. Bailey (born 1968) is an American Anglican bishop. He was elected bishop of the Churches for the Sake of Others (C4SO) in April 2025, and consecrated in September 2025. He was formerly Canon for Leadership Developoment in the Diocese of Christ Our Hope, Managing Director of the Centre for Social Justice, and Affiliated Lecturer at the University of Cambridge. He is also the co-editor of the 2011 volume An Eerdmans Reader in Contemporary Political Theology.

== Career ==
=== Academia and policy ===
Bailey completed his Ph.D. in theology at the University of Cambridge in 2010 with a dissertation entitled The political theology of Karl Barth for an ascendant American Evangelicalism. He also taught in the Faculty of Divinity at the University of Cambridge.

He was then Deputy Director and Managing Director of the Centre for Social Justice in London, a policy think tank focused on poverty and opportunity in vulnerable communities.

Since 2024 he has taught part-time as an adjunct professor of Christian Thought at Gordon-Conwell Theological Seminary.

=== Ministry ===
Bailey’s early ministry was in the Vineyard movement. He served as an assistant pastor at The King’s Arms Church in Bedford, England, and was deputy to the national coordinator for church planting in the Association of Vineyard Churches USA.

After moving into Anglican ministry, Bailey was trained for ordination at the Church of the Resurrection, Washington, D.C., and was ordained deacon in 2017 and priest in 2018 by Steve Breedlove, bishop of the Diocese of Christ Our Hope. He later assisted at the Church of the Advent in Washington, D.C.

From 2019 to 2025 Bailey served as Canon for Leadership Development in the Diocese of Christ Our Hope, overseeing theological education, clergy training, and diocesan strategies.

=== Episcopacy ===
In April 2025 Bailey was elected diocesan bishop of C4SO, succeeding Todd Hunter. He was consecrated on September 27, 2025, at Truro Anglican Church by Bishop Steve Wood.

== Publications ==
Bailey is co-editor of An Eerdmans Reader in Contemporary Political Theology (Wm. B. Eerdmans, 2011), with William T. Cavanaugh and Craig Hovey. He also co-edited a 2007 special issue of the Cambridge Review of International Affairs on religion and international relations. His shorter writings include an article in The Christian Century (2006) and a book review in Studies in Christian Ethics (2007).

== Personal life ==
Bailey is married to Alicia Bailey, a psychotherapist in private practice. They have three children.
