= Theology and Social Theory =

1990 book by John Milbank

Theology and Social Theory: Beyond Secular Reason
- Author: John Milbank
- Language: English
- Series: Signposts in Theology
- Publisher: Blackwell
- Publication date: 1990
- Publication place: United Kingdom
- ISBN: 978-0-631-14573-8
- Dewey Decimal: 261.5
- LC Class: BR115.S57

Theology and Social Theory: Beyond Secular Reason was a 1990 book by the English Anglican philosophical theologian John Milbank. It has been argued that the book laid the groundwork for the radical orthodoxy movement.
