= William T. Cavanaugh =

American Roman Catholic theologian (born 1962)

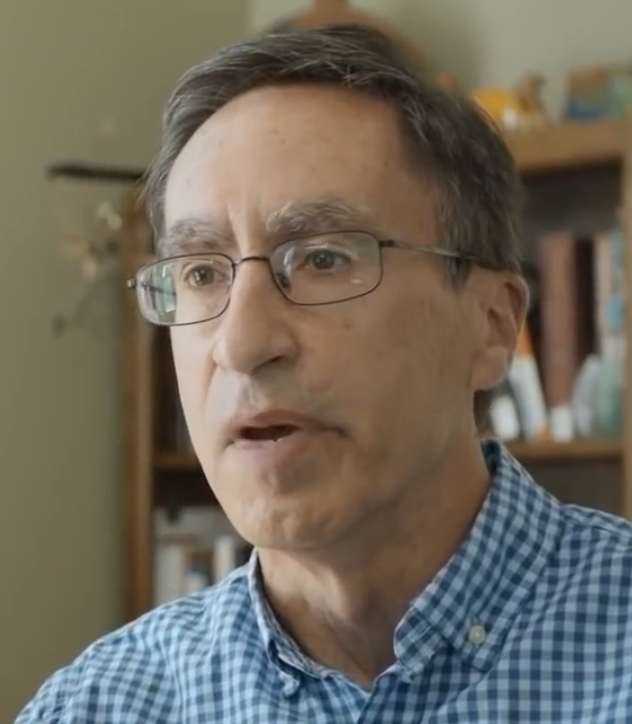
- Cavanaugh in 2022
- Born: 1962 (age 63–64)

Academic background
- Education: University of Notre Dame; St Edmund's College, Cambridge; Duke University
- Thesis: Torture and Eucharist in Pinochet's Chile (1996)
- Doctoral advisor: Stanley Hauerwas
- Influences: John Milbank

Academic work
- Discipline: Theology; religious studies
- Sub-discipline: Political theology; economic ethics; ecclesiology
- School or tradition: Catholic Post-liberalism
- Institutions: University of St. Thomas; DePaul University
- Influenced: Catherine Pickstock

William T. Cavanaugh (born 1962) is an American Catholic theologian known for his work in political theology and Christian ethics.

== Biography ==
Cavanaugh received his Bachelor of Arts degree in theology from the University of Notre Dame in 1984, and a Master of Arts degree from the University of Cambridge in 1987. He later attended Duke University, where he received a Doctor of Philosophy degree in religion in 1996. His areas of specialization are in political theology, economic ethics, and ecclesiology.

Cavanaugh taught at the University of St. Thomas in Minnesota for 15 years. He also spent two years working in Santiago, Chile. In 2010, he was appointed to DePaul University, where he is currently professor of Catholic studies and director of the Center for World Catholicism and Intercultural Theology, a center studying the Catholic Church in the Global South.

He has published numerous books and articles, some of which have been translated into several languages. Along with Jim Fodor, Cavanaugh is an editor of the journal Modern Theology.

== Publications ==
- Cavanaugh, William. Torture and Eucharist: Theology, Politics, and the Body of Christ. Oxford: Blackwell Publishing, 1998.
- Cavanaugh, William. Theopolitical Imagination. New York: T&T Clark, 2003.
- Scott, Peter and William Cavanaugh, eds. The Blackwell Companion to Political Theology. Oxford: Blackwell Publishing, 2004.
- Cavanaugh, William. Being Consumed: Economics and Christian Desire. Grand Rapids, Michigan: Eerdmans Publishing, 2008.
- Cavanaugh, William. The Myth of Religious Violence: Secular Ideology and the Roots of Modern Conflict. Oxford: Oxford University Press, 2009.
- Cavanaugh, William. Migrations of the Holy. Grand Rapids, Michigan: Eerdmans Publishing, 2011.
- Cavanaugh, William, Jeffrey W. Bailey, and Craig Hovey, eds. An Eerdmans Reader in Contemporary Political Theology. Grand Rapids, Michigan: Eerdmans Publishing, 2012.
- Cavanaugh, William. Field Hospital: The Church's Engagement With a Wounded World. Grand Rapids, Michigan: Eerdmans Publishing, 2016.
- Cavanaugh, William and James K.A. Smith, eds. Evolution and the Fall. Grand Rapids, Michigan: Eerdmans Publishing, 2017.
- Cavanaugh, William. The Uses of Idolatry. Oxford: Oxford University Press, 2024.
