= Diocese of Churches for the Sake of Others =

Anglican diocese in the United States

Location
- Ecclesiastical province: Anglican Church in North America
- Headquarters: Franklin, Tennessee

Statistics
- Parishes: 56 (2026)
- Members: 12,660 (2025)

Information
- Rite: Anglican

Current leadership
- Diocesan bishop: Jeff Bailey
- Suffragan: Brian Wallace

Website
- www.c4so.org

The Diocese of Churches for the Sake of Others (C4SO) is a non-geographical diocese of the Anglican Church in North America. Formed as a diocese in 2013, C4SO originated as the West Coast church planting initiative in the Anglican Mission in the Americas but today has member churches across the United States. Founded by Todd Hunter, who was a leader in the North American Pentecostal movement before he became Anglican, the C4SO diocese embodies charismatic and evangelical streams within the Anglican tradition. By membership and attendance, the diocese is one of the largest in the ACNA.

== History ==
C4SO began in 2009 as a church planting movement within the AMiA, when AMiA was the missionary body of the Anglican Church of Rwanda in North America during the Anglican realignment. C4SO's original goal was to plant 100 churches over a decade. The West Coast focus was in part due to the concentration of atheists, agnostics and so-called "nones" in the Western United States. Hunter—who had previously held leadership roles in the Calvary Chapel, Vineyard and Alpha organizations—was ordained as an Anglican deacon in 2008 and as a priest in the spring of 2009 and then elected an AMIA bishop in the summer of 2009 to lead the C4SO initiative. C4SO's name was tied to Hunter's 2009 book Christianity Beyond Belief: Following Jesus for the Sake of Others.

=== Relationship with the ACNA ===
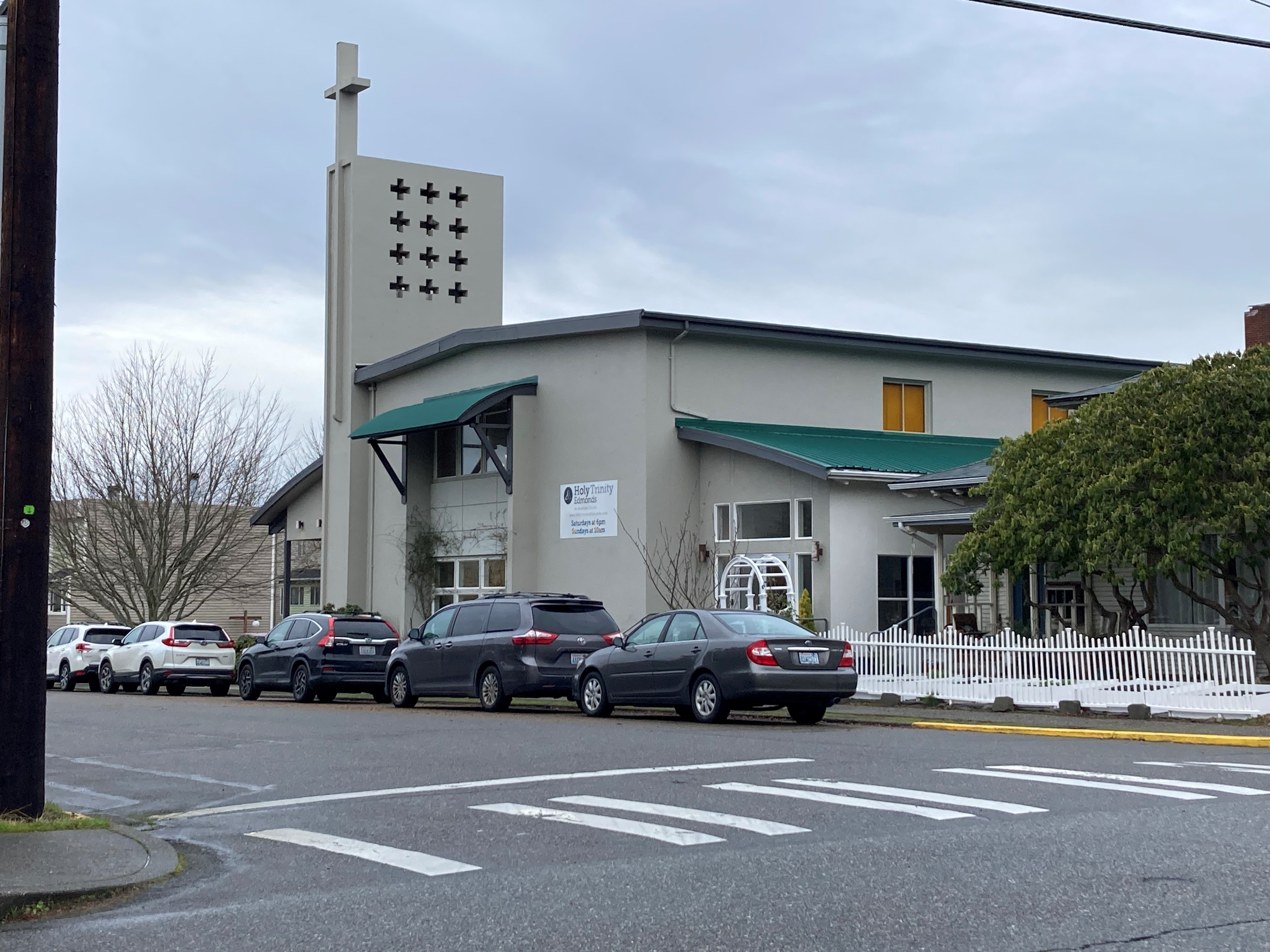
Holy Trinity Edmonds, planted in 2014 in collaboration with C4SO and the Diocese of Cascadia.

In 2010, AMIA—which had been a founding member of the ACNA the year before—left full membership, changing its status in ACNA to "ministry partner." By the next year, the relationship between AMIA chairman Charles Murphy and the Anglican Church of Rwanda's house of bishops, led by Kolini's successor Onesphore Rwaje, had broken down over questions of financial transparency and collegiality. All but two AMIA bishops followed Murphy and AMIA out of Rwandan jurisdiction and restructured it as a "missionary society." While most AMIA congregations left the organization, either to join ACNA directly or to establish canonical "dual citizenship" with ACNA and Rwanda in PEARUSA, C4SO initially remained in the AMIA.

In 2012, Hunter was received as an assisting bishop in the Anglican Diocese of Pittsburgh under Archbishop Robert Duncan and "re-launched" C4SO within the ACNA, pledging that C4SO "will happily plant churches in partnership with PEARUSA, [AMIA] and the ACNA." C4SO was officially recognized as a diocese by the ACNA’s Provincial Council in June 2013, with the investiture of Hunter as diocesan bishop taking place during the ACNA College of Bishops meeting on January 6, 2014. In 2016, C4SO joined the dioceses of Cascadia, San Joaquin, the Southwest and Western Anglicans to streamline the ordination process in ACNA's western regions, with a joint exam and a joint examining board that would allow clergy ordained under the standards to serve in any participating diocese.

During its first decade in the ACNA, C4SO experienced substantial growth through church planting and adoption, tripling between 2013 and 2019 and becoming the second-largest diocese in the ACNA, after the Diocese of South Carolina, by attendance. C4SO also demonstrated high levels of congregational engagement, according to scholar Jeremy Bonner, with a "commitment index"—the ratio of average Sunday attendance to membership—of 89.3 in 2019. "The growth of C4SO massively outpaces all [Episcopal Church] dioceses in the same period," write Bonner and David Goodhew. In 2025, C4SO reported 56 congregations (up 12% from 2022) with 12,014 members (up 44% from 2022) and average Sunday attendance of 12,660 (up 60% from 2022). These figures made it the largest diocese in the ACNA by attendance and the second-largest, after the Diocese of South Carolina, by membership.

=== Congregational departures from the ACNA ===
In 2021–2024, at least four church plants left C4SO for denominations more theologically liberal than the ACNA and in part due to disagreements with the ACNA doctrine of marriage, generating substantial media coverage. In September 2021, St. Mary of Bethany Parish in Nashville departed C4SO out of disagreement over "the ACNA’s emphasis that the world is in need of a church that is 'always moving forward' to 'extend' and 'advance' God’s rule with 'boot camp' training and preparation." St. Mary's rector joined the Communion of Evangelical Episcopal Churches and said the congregation would discern a call to join this denomination.

In October 2022, Bishop Jennifer Baskerville-Burrows announced that the Table, a C4SO church plant in Indianapolis, had been accepted into the Episcopal Diocese of Indianapolis as a mission church. The congregation's members voted 44 to 4 to join the Episcopal Church.

In July 2023, Resurrection South Austin, a C4SO church plant in Austin, announced that it had disaffiliated with C4SO and would seek membership in the Episcopal Diocese of Texas. Noting the history of congregational property litigation and animosity that had occurred between dioceses and parishes leaving the Episcopal Church for the ACNA, in all three cases, Hunter gave his blessing to the congregations and clergy wishing to depart.

In 2024, Luminous Anglican Parish in Franklin disaffiliated from C4SO. Prior to the disaffiliation, at least one of the church's affiliated clergy had participated in a Nashville-area Pride Month event.

== Beliefs and practices ==
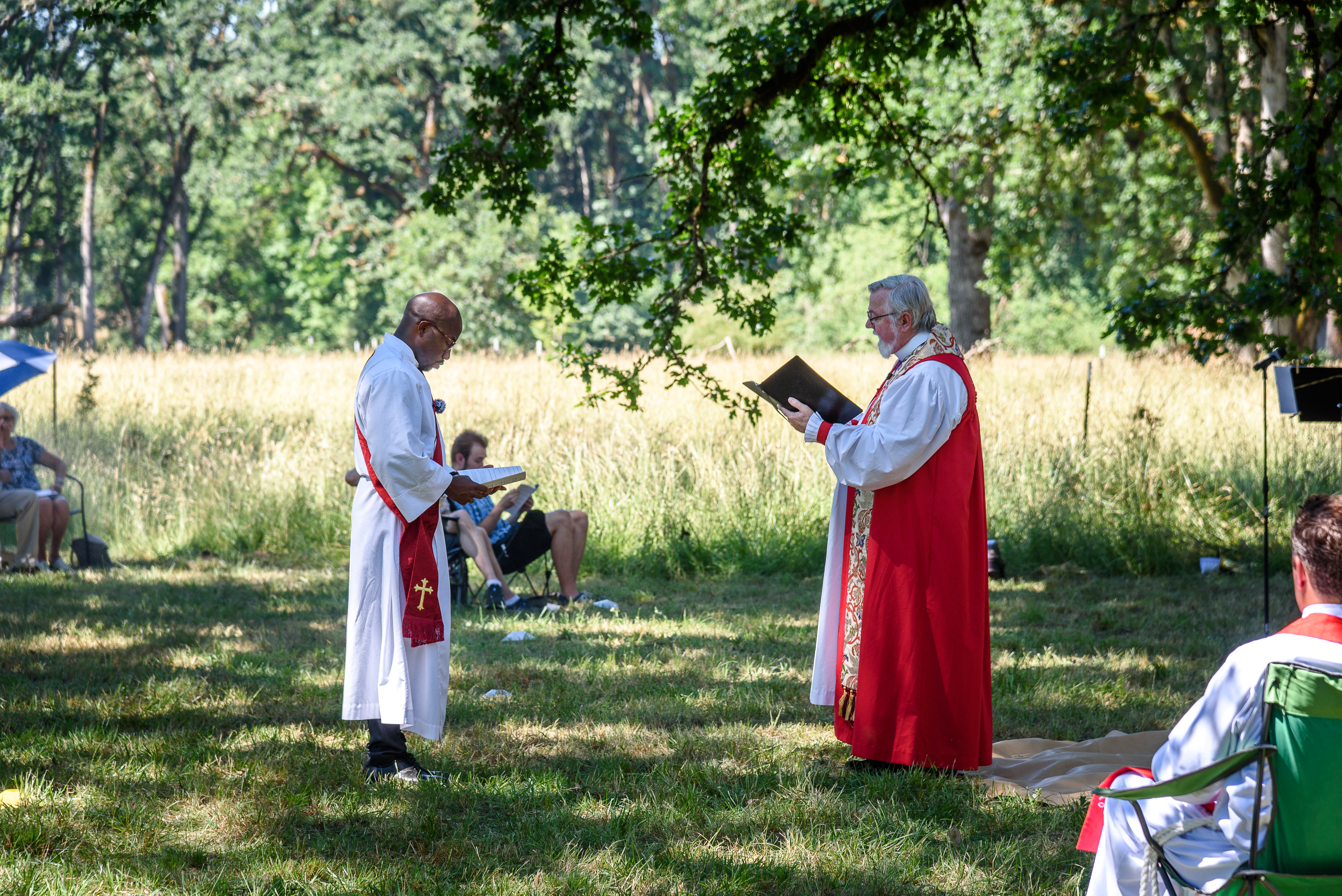
A priest is ordained in the C4SO Diocese in an outdoor service in Portland, Oregon.

C4SO identifies its values as "kingdom, spirit, formation, mission, and sacrament." Hunter has described the diocese as being "thoroughly committed to orthodox Christianity" and "equally committed to figuring out how to live that out winsomely and truthfully, without engaging in culture wars constantly." In his 2011 memoir The Accidental Anglican, Hunter describes a "church for the sake of others" as one that "kept its focus on those without faith" and, "following the footsteps of Jesus, stayed in conversation with contemporary seekers."

C4SO draws from the charismatic and evangelical traditions, with its bishop Todd Hunter being formerly associated with the Association of Vineyard Churches and Calvary Chapel. According to Hunter, key influences on C4SO's beliefs and practices are the missiology of Roland Allen and Lesslie Newbigin, the cultural engagement of Eddie Gibbs and Michael Green, the evangelistic approaches of Terry Fullam and Holy Trinity Brompton's Sandy Millar, the Prayer Book heritage of Thomas Cranmer, and the "inward-outward" discipleship practices described by Elizabeth O'Connor.

=== Ordination of women ===
C4SO has practiced the ordination of women both to the diaconate and the priesthood since its founding. In 2017, following the ACNA Report on Holy Orders (which affirmed the ACNA's constitutional practice of "dual integrities" on women's ordination), Hunter said that C4SO would "continue our practice of ordaining women of character and integrity as priests and deacons, enabling them to serve in whatever way their spiritual gifts, calling and temperament call for. . . . To those who have wrestled or still do with the issue of women’s ordination to the priesthood: You are welcome in C4SO too." Further guidance from C4SO in 2023 requires all clergy in C4SO to "honor women’s Spirit-gifted agency for leadership, both lay and ordained," by recognizing the validity of sacraments performed by female priests and deacons, nurturing women called to ordained and lay leadership, submitting to the authority of female rectors, deans, and canons in C4SO, and "commit[ing] not to preach, teach, or publicly endorse theology that undermines either our Canons, or C4SO’s vision for honoring women’s gifts of, and calling to, leadership."

=== Church planting and adoption ===
In its early days in the ACNA, C4SO often planted churches collaboratively; for example, in 2014, C4SO partnered with the geographical Diocese of Cascadia to plant a church in Edmonds, Washington, which eventually was released to Cascadia. Vintage Church, a multisite church in the Los Angeles area, is one of the largest churches in C4SO and was planted in conjunction with the UK-based HTB network. Vintage has since supported other C4SO church plants in Southern California.

C4SO also has a process for "adopting" established congregations that desire to move from other traditions. In the early 2020s, for example, several Presbyterian Church in America churches joined C4SO.

C4SO maintains a Diaspora Network to support immigrant diaspora Anglican churches worshiping in non-English languages and with home country traditions.

== Structure ==
C4SO was led by Todd Hunter as its founding diocesan bishop. In the absence of a diocesan bishop, the C4SO canons call for the Executive Leadership Team, made up of elected lay and clergy delegates, to be the ecclesiastical authority. Since 2023, Brian Wallace has served under Hunter as C4SO's first full-time bishop suffragan. Other key leaders include canon theologians Esau McCaulley and Scot McKnight.
