= Moral clarity =

American political catchphrase

Moral clarity is a catchphrase associated with American political conservatives.

An early use of the term was in a 1934 speech at the American Philosophical Association, as William Safire found. The phrase was first used in its current context during the 1980s, in reference to the politics of Ronald Reagan. At the start of George W. Bush's presidency in 2001, according to philosopher Susan Neiman, "it was firmly in conservative hands. In America, the phrase is so deeply associated with Bush that only his defenders were inclined to use it." Following the attacks of September 11, 2001, the term was popularized by William J. Bennett's 2003 book Why We Fight: Moral Clarity and the War on Terrorism.

The phrase moral clarity encodes a complex political argument that includes all of the following claims:

- The war on terrorism, like some previous wars involving the United States (particularly World War II and the Cold War), is a conflict between good and evil.
- Traditional American values like democracy and freedom are universal human rights, worth promoting and defending through military intervention.
- Attempts to understand or explain the actions of anti-Western terrorists as justifiable responses to actions of the United States or Israel are a sign of moral weakness at best, and sympathy for the terrorists at worst, and will hamper efforts to defeat them.
- Though the actions of the United States and its allies may lead to civilian deaths or other forms of collateral damage, may require the use of means such as torture that would be condemned in other contexts, and may involve temporary alliances with undemocratic regimes, these actions are justified by the greater moral necessity of defeating terrorism and thus promoting American values and ensuring long-term U.S. security.
- Opponents of action against terrorists are guilty of promoting moral relativism or moral equivalence, in which the allegedly similar means of both anti-terrorists and terrorists are used to blur the moral differences between good and evil.

== Opposing views ==
For opponents of the notion of "moral clarity", dividing the world into good and evil does not lend itself to a workable foreign policy. For example, if Iraq was invaded for reasons of "moral clarity", it follows that other "rogue states" (like North Korea) would also be similarly attacked. This apparent contradiction is used to argue that proponents of "moral clarity" are guilty of hypocrisy or special pleading, and that the slogan moral clarity masks less exalted reasons for military intervention, particularly economic motives.

Opponents of the notion of "moral clarity" also note that organizations such as al Qaida and neo-Nazis also believe that their own point of view is one of "moral clarity", which justifies them to take whatever action they feel necessary against what they see as the "forces of evil". Thus, opponents of the notion of "moral clarity" assert that, but for the accident of their country and culture of birth, the proponents of "moral clarity" might well be on the opposite side, holding the same views. Proponents of this view argue that understanding the motivations and values of other cultures, rather than labeling them "evil", is a better first step in eliminating violence.

Critics also argue that "moral clarity" promotes a dangerous view expressed in the famous phrase "My country, right or wrong". The idea that the United States is always "good" is actually an argument of moral relativism, they say, since it makes no distinction between right and wrong actions. Furthermore, it is argued that "moral clarity" is used to discredit those who want to hold the United States to a higher moral standard than "My country, right or wrong", a standard expressed by U.S. Brigadier General Carl Schurz: "Our country right or wrong. When right, to be kept right; when wrong, to be put right."

== See also ==
- American exceptionalism – the idea (not traditionally restricted to conservatives) that the United States has special values and a unique role in promoting and defending those values
- Useful idiot – disparaging term for Americans who purportedly lack "moral clarity"
