= Ched Myers =

American theologian

- Born: 20th century
- Occupation: Theologian
- Years active: Since mid-20th century
- Spouse: Elaine Enns
- Website: chedmyers.org

Ched Myers is an American theologian specializing in biblical studies and political theology.

== Career ==
Since the late 1970s, Myers has been involved in numerous issues including movement work for racial justice, economic equity, indigenous sovereignty, anti-nuclear activism and ecological justice and restoration. He has traveled as an "old-school" itinerant teacher for over twenty years teaching in homes, churches, retreat centers and more.

In 1988, Myers published Binding the Strong Man – A Political Reading of Mark's Story of Jesus, which was influential in the Radical Discipleship Movement, particularly within the Catholic Worker Movement. The book was one of the earliest commentaries to take an empire-critical view, a view that was marginal in the 1980s, but is now widely accepted within the academy. Throughout the late 1990s and early 2000s, Myers devoted much of his teaching to what he calls Sabbath economics.

He works alongside his wife, Elaine Enns, as part of Bartimaeus Cooperative Ministries, where the emphasis is on education for restorative justice, biblical literacy, ecological discipleship and radical economic sharing.

=== Sabbath economics ===
Sabbath economics is an economic system championed by Myers. The model is an application of the economic aspects of the Biblical Sabbath to modern socioeconomics. In the introduction of his book introducing this model, Myers states that "God's people are instructed to dismantle, on a regular basis, the fundamental patterns and structures of stratified wealth and power, so that there is 'enough for everyone.' " This statement contains two of the core principles of Myer's socioeconomic vision:

1. The focus on voluntary redistribution of wealth
2. A foundation of abundance as opposed to scarcity in other modern economic models.

The Biblical concepts from which Sabbath economics draws are:

- Sabbath day, particularly during the journey through the wilderness as described in Exodus 15–17
- Sabbath year, described in Exodus 23, where the land was not cultivated, and Israelite slaves were released every seventh year
- Year of Jubilee every 50th year, when all debts were cancelled and all property returned to the original owners

Others have since sought to explore the ideas of a Sabbath economy in practical ways. Sabbath economics and related concepts of jubilee economics have also received attention from the liberation theology community, and other Christian thinkers who focus on social justice, gender equality and other humanitarian issues.

== Selected works ==
=== Single-author books ===
2008/1988 Binding the Strong Man: A Political Reading of Mark's Story of Jesus. Maryknoll: Orbis Books. 20th anniversary edition with new front matter. 1989 Catholic Press Association Book Award in scripture. Translated into Portuguese as O Evangelho de Sao Marcos, Grande Comentario Biblico series, São Paulo:Edicoes Paulinas, 1992.

2001 “...and distributed it to whoever had need.” The Biblical Vision of Sabbath Economics. Tell the Word, Washington, DC: Church of the Savior.

1996 Proclamation 6, Year B, Pentecost 1. Minneapolis: Augsburg/Fortress.

1994 Who Will Roll Away the Stone? Queries for First World Christians. Maryknoll: Orbis Books.

2023 The Biblical Vision of Sabbath Economics. Lab/Ora Press.

2025 Healing Affluenza and Resisting Plutocracy: Luke's Jesus and Sabbath Economics. Fortress Press.

=== Co-authored books ===
2012 Our God Is Undocumented: Biblical Faith and Immigrant Justice. With Matthew Colwell. Maryknoll: Orbis Books.

2011 Liberating Biblical Study: Scholarship, Art and Action in Honor of the Center and Library for the Bible and Social Justice. With Laurel Dykstra. Eugene, OR: Cascade Books.

2009 Ambassadors of Reconciliation, Vol. I: New Testament Reflections on Restorative Justice and Peacemaking. With Elaine Enns. Maryknoll: Orbis Books.
Ambassadors of Reconciliation, Vol. II: Diverse Christian Practices of Restorative Justice and Peacemaking. With Elaine Enns. Maryknoll: Orbis Books.

1996 “Say to This Mountain”: Mark's Story of Discipleship. With Stuart Taylor, Cindy Moe-Lobeda, Joseph Nangle, OFM and Marie Dennis. Maryknoll: Orbis Books.

1991 The American Journey, 1492-1992: A Call to Conversion. With Stuart Taylor, Cindy Moe-Lobeda, and Marie Dennis. Erie, PA: Pax Christi Press.

1990 Resisting the Serpent: Palau's Struggle for Self-Determination. With Robert Aldridge. Baltimore: Fortkamp Press.

== See also ==
- List of theologians
- Lists of American writers
