= Mark Lewis Taylor =

American theologian (born 1951)

Mark Lewis Taylor (born February 3, 1951) is Maxwell M. Upson Professor of Theology and Culture at Princeton Theological Seminary. His major interests are in the political philosophy of religious practices and theological discourse, particularly in Christian communities and also broader social movements. He served as Chair of the Religion & Society Committee at Princeton Seminary. Taylor received the Best General Interest Book Award for his earlier book, The Executed God: The Way of the Cross in Lockdown America (2001). He is also founder of Educators for Mumia Abu-Jamal.

== Bibliography ==
- The Theological and the Political: On the Weight of the World. Minneapolis, MN: Fortress Press, 2011. Interview on book at The Immanent Frame
- Religion, Politics and the Christian Right: Post-9/11 Politics and American Empire. Minneapolis: Fortress Press, 2005
- The Executed God: The Way of the Cross in Lockdown America. Minneapolis: Fortress Press, 2001
- Reconstructing Christian Theology, co-edited with Rebecca S. Chopp. Minneapolis: Fortress, 1994
- Remembering Esperanza: A Cultural-Political Theology for North American Praxis. Maryknoll, N.Y.: Orbis Books, 1990. Reissued with a new Preface, 2005, Fortress Press.
- Paul Tillich: Theologian of the Boundaries. London: Collins and Harper & Row, 1987, and paperback published by Fortress Press, 1991)
- Beyond Explanation: Religious Dimensions in Cultural Anthropology. Macon: Mercer University Press, 1986.
