= Catherine Pickstock =

English Anglican theologian (born 1970)

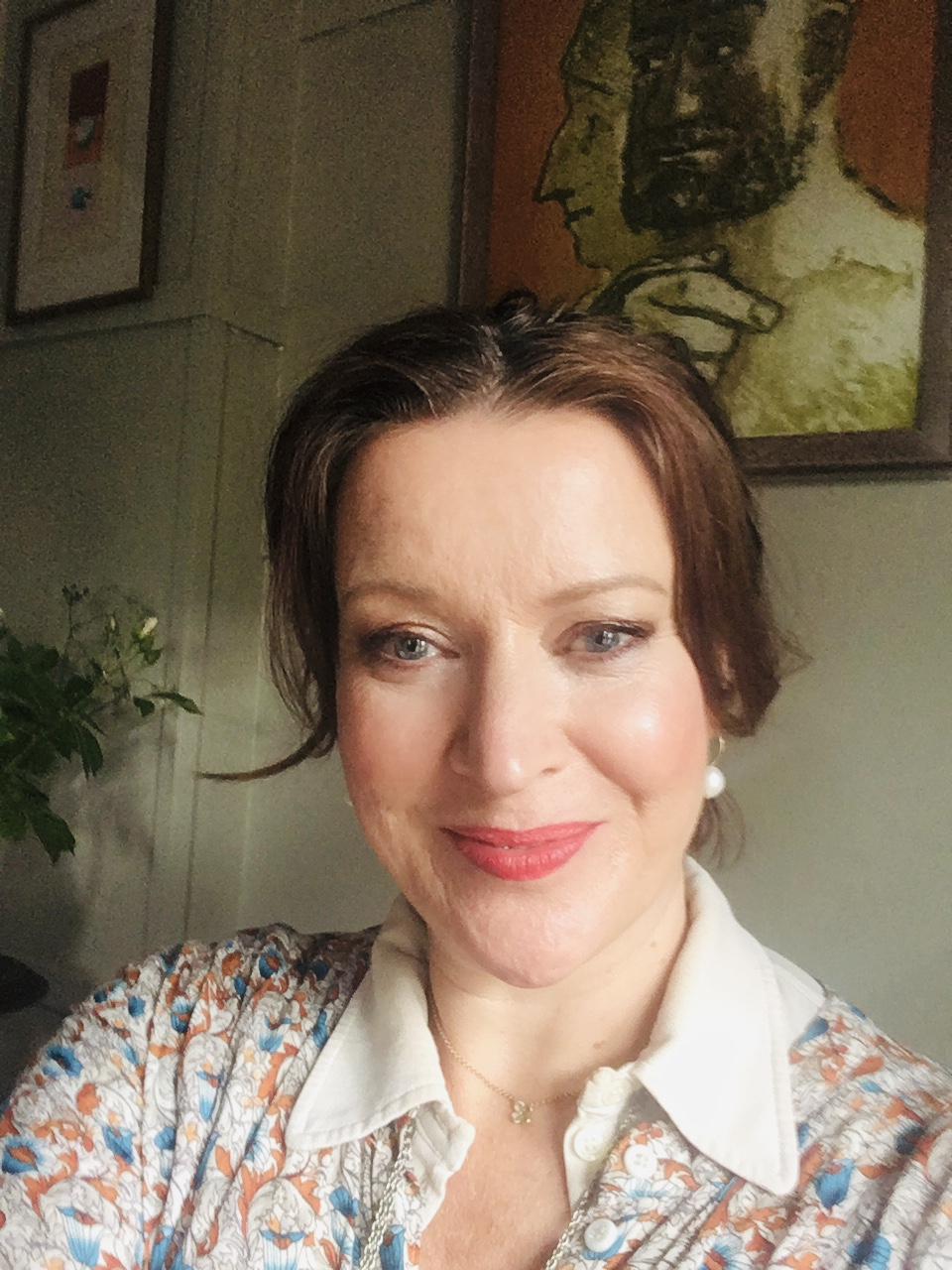
- Pickstock in 2020
- Born: Catherine Jane Crozier Pickstock; 1970 (age 55–56); New York City, US
- Spouse: Thomas Harrison (m. 2002)

Academic background
- Education: St Catharine's College, Cambridge
- Thesis: The Sacred Polis (1996)
- Doctoral advisor: John Milbank
- Influences: Thomas Aquinas; Augustine of Hippo; Henri Bergson; William T. Cavanaugh; Jean-Louis Chrétien; Henri de Lubac; Søren Kierkegaard; Jean-Luc Marion; John Milbank; Plato; Félix Ravaisson

Academic work
- Discipline: Theology; philosophy
- Sub-discipline: Metaphysics; philosophical theology; philosophy of language; philosophy of religion
- School or tradition: Anglo-Catholicism; continental philosophy; radical orthodoxy
- Institutions: Emmanuel College, Cambridge
- Doctoral students: John Hughes; Simon Oliver
- Main interests: Liturgy; metaphysics of participation; metaphysics of repetition; poetics; truth
- Notable works: After Writing (1997); Radical Orthodoxy (1999)
- Influenced: Simon Oliver; James K. A. Smith

Catherine Jane Crozier Pickstock (born 1970) is an English philosophical theologian. Best known for her contributions to the radical orthodoxy movement, she has been Norris-Hulse Professor of Divinity at the University of Cambridge since 2018 and a fellow and tutor of Emmanuel College, Cambridge. She was previously Professor of Metaphysics and Poetics.

== Early life and education ==
Catherine Jane Crozier Pickstock was born in 1970 in New York City, United States, but grew up in England. Though not raised in the Church of England, she credits her grandparents with introducing her both to Anglican liturgy and to the ethical-political concerns of the Anglican tradition.

She was educated at Channing School, an all-girls private school in Highgate, London, England. Having won a choral scholarship, she studied English literature at St Catharine's College, Cambridge, graduating with a Bachelor of Arts (BA) degree in 1991. Interested in the relationship between poetics and metaphysics, she then moved into philosophical theology and undertook postgraduate studies in this field at the Faculty of Divinity, University of Cambridge. She completed her Doctor of Philosophy (PhD) degree in 1996 with a thesis titled The Sacred Polis: Language, Death and Liturgy. Her doctoral supervisor was John Milbank.

== Academic career ==
From 1995 to 1998, Pickstock was a Research Fellow of Emmanuel College, Cambridge. From 1998 to 2000, she held a British Academy Postdoctoral Fellowship in the Faculty of Divinity, University of Cambridge. In 2000, she was appointed a University Lecturer in Philosophy of Religion in the Faculty of Divinity. In 2006, she was promoted to Reader in Philosophy and Theology. From 2016 to 2017, she was also a Mellon Teaching Fellow at the Centre for Research in the Arts, Social Sciences and Humanities. In 2015, she was made Professor of Metaphysics and Poetics.

In March 2018, it was announced that Pickstock would be the next Norris–Hulse Professor of Divinity. She took up the Chair on 1 October 2018.

== Works and major themes ==
Pickstock has from the start of her career been associated with the radical orthodoxy movement, on account of her collaboration with John Milbank, her then doctoral supervisor. Her own academic work is both like and unlike that of her mentor: they are both identifiable as "post-modern critical Augustinian" theologians, heavily influenced by both 20th-century French theory and the Christian Platonic tradition. At the same time, where Milbank's work (especially Theology and Social Theory) tends to focus on the historical critique and re-narration of other authors' projects, Pickstock's writing tends to be more question-oriented, more affirmative, and less narrative. Her work also tends to begin more frequently with direct reflection upon the writings of Plato, an engagement she has continued to pursue throughout her career.

The dominant theme in Pickstock's writing thus far has been the way in which humans participate in the divine creation through language. Within this paradigm, at least four interlinked subthemes have found expression in her various writings: liturgy, music, repetition, and truth. First, the meaning and significance of liturgy, which was the subject of Pickstock's dissertation and first book, After Writing: On the Liturgical Consummation of Philosophy (1998). There, and in a number of related essays, she argues that language is fundamentally “doxological”: “that is to say, language exists primarily, and in the end only has meaning as, the praise of the divine” (xiii). Thus, liturgical speech is language par excellence, and the modern fall away from spoken, liturgical order into written metaphysical systems is the key to philosophy's failure over the last few centuries. The path of return, as Pickstock conceives it, runs through the postmodern (largely French) critique of modernity, then beyond to a non-foundational theology of liturgical encounter—an encounter with being through language.

A second, closely related theme of Pickstock's work has been the place of music in Western thought. Building on the foundation of Augustine's treatise De Musica, several of Pickstock's essays have argued that music is “the science that most leads toward theology," provided it be properly conceived as a contemplative mode of measuring reality. While certain modern approaches to music, as narrated by Pickstock, have tended to distort its metaphysical character in various ways, certain 20th-century and contemporary composers such as Olivier Messiaen and James MacMillan have opened up possibilities of radical return.

Third, Pickstock has focused in much of her writing on the metaphysical significance of the phenomenon of repetition. While the notion is already present in After Writing, she focuses on it squarely in her 2013 book, Repetition and Identity, which opens with the claim that we define our own identities precisely in the act of identifying those of others. Somehow, identification of self and other are bound up together: “The external acts of recognition, and our internal access to a specific identity, seem to depend upon one another” (1). The book presents a phenomenological account of how this dual identification happens in human experience, and happens precisely through repetition. For the form of the other—of anything a person encounters or takes in—will necessarily strike the perceiver differently every time, so that each act of recognition circles back to the other's identity, but in a new way. Every recognition is thus both the same as and different from all previous perceptions. This habit of repetition in difference defines us: “the idea of forms and forces flowing into us from without, and there self-transmuting and pleating back upon themselves”—this “form[s] our subjectivity,” our sense of ourselves (17). At the same time, the identity of the other—of each identified thing—comes more and more fully into being through the repetitions of human language, which are always adding new details, new angles.

The fourth major theme in Pickstock's thought has been the metaphysics of truth. In her co-authored 2001 book, Truth in Aquinas, as well as her 2020 monograph, Aspects of Truth: A New Religious Metaphysics, Pickstock develops an approach to truth that is both philosophical and theological at once, ultimately because she thinks the two discourses cannot in fact be separated. At the heart of the latter book is the claim that “the epistemological approach to truth”—the dominant modern way that ever more carefully unpacks the conditions for truth's possibility—cannot in fact “yield truth” (x). This is because, for Pickstock, truth is always already metaphysical, referring to a way of being in relation to what is, and this primary relation of knower and known can never be reached by epistemological pathways. Now, given the postmodern deconstruction of modern epistemology, she believes the time is right for a radical return to "pre-modern metaphysical approaches to truth. ...For such approaches," she writes, "truth coincides with being as a 'transcendental', and yet it is surplus to being, insofar as being itself is taken to be manifestatory and expressive" (x). In other words, the human knower, in relation to being as such, always has something of his or her own to add, a new aspect, a fresh take, a singular angle of reception. Truth is thus ever growing, ever adding to the deposit of being by means of differentiated repetition.

Pickstock's project, finally, circles around the way that human experience, especially as mediated through language, music, art, works to extend the creation beyond what it now is, participating in the never-finished work of God.

== Bibliography ==
=== Books ===
- Pickstock, Catherine (1997). After writing : on the liturgical consummation of philosophy. Oxford: Blackwell. ISBN 9780631206729
- Radical Orthodoxy: A New Theology. Edited with John Milbank and Graham Ward. Radical Orthodoxy. London: Routledge. 1999. ISBN 978-0-415-19699-4.
- Truth in Aquinas. With John Milbank. Radical Orthodoxy. London: Routledge. 2001. ISBN 978-0-415-23335-4.
- Thomas d'Aquin et la quête eucharistique. Paris: Ad Solem. 2001. ISBN 978-2-940-09068-6.
- Repetition and Identity. The Literary Agenda. Oxford: Oxford University Press. 2013. ISBN 978-0-19-968361-1.
- Aspects of Truth: A New Religious Metaphysics. Cambridge: Cambridge University Press. 2020. ISBN 978-1-10-884032-3.
- Fabula Rustici, or, The Bumpkin Play. New York City: Angelico Press. 2025. ISBN 979-8892800983.

=== Articles and book chapters ===
- "Asyndeton: Syntax and Insanity. A Study of the Revision of the Nicene Creed". Modern Theology. 10 (4): 321–340. 1994. doi:10.1111/j.1468-0025.1994.tb00043.x.
- "The Musical Imperative". Angelaki. 3 (2): 7–29. 1998. doi:10.1080/09697259808571981.
- "Liturgy and Modernity". Telos. 1998 (113): 19–40. 1998. ISSN 1940-459X.
- "Thomas Aquinas and the Quest for the Eucharist". Modern Theology. 15 (2): 159–180. 1999. doi:10.1111/1468-0025.00092. ISSN 1468-0025.
- "The Problem of Reported Speech: Friendship and Philosophy in Plato's Lysis and Symposium". New Blackfriars. 82 (969): 525–540. 2001. doi:10.1111/j.1741-2005.2001.tb01783.x. ISSN 1741-2005.
- "Justice and Prudence: Principles of Order in the Platonic City". The Heythrop Journal. 42 (3): 269–282. 2001. doi:10.1111/1468-2265.00159.
- "Liturgy, Art and Politics". Modern Theology. 16 (2): 159–180. 2002. doi:10.1111/1468-0025.00120. ISSN 0266-7177.
- "Postmodern Scholasticism: Critique of Postmodern Univocity". Telos. 2003 (126): 3–24. 2003.
- "Eros and Emergence". Telos. 2004 (127): 97–118. 2004. ISSN 1940-459X.
- "A Poetics of the Eucharist". Telos. 2005 (131): 83–91. 2005. ISSN 1940-459X.
- "Duns Scotus: His Historical and Contemporary Significance". Modern Theology. 21 (4): 543–574. 2005. doi:10.1111/j.1468-0025.2005.00297.x. ISSN 1468-0025.
- "The Univocalist Mode of Production". In Theology and the Political: The New Debate. Edited by Creston Davis, John Milbank, and Slavoj Žižek. Sic. 5. Durham, North Carolina: Duke University Press. 2005. pp. 281–325. ISBN 978-0-822-33472-9.
- "God and Meaning in Music: Messiaen, Deleuze, and the Musico-Theological Critique of Modernism and Postmodernism". Sacred Music. 134 (4): 40–62. 2007. ISSN 0036-2255.
- "Liturgy and the Senses". In Paul's New Moment: Continental Philosophy and the Future of Christian Theology. Edited by John Milbank, Slavoj Žižek, and Creston Davis. Grand Rapids, Michigan: Brazos Press. 2010. pp. 125–145. ISBN 978-1-587-43227-9.
- "The Late Arrival of Language: Word, Nature and the Divine in Plato's Cratylus". Modern Theology. 27 (2): 238–262. 2011. doi:10.1111/j.1468-0025.2011.01674.x. ISSN 1468-0025.
- "The One Story: A Critique of David Kelsey's Theological Robotics". Modern Theology. 27 (1): 26–40. 2011. doi:10.1111/j.1468-0025.2010.01652.x. ISSN 0266-7177.
- "Numbers and Lines: Metaphysics and the Problem of International Order". Oxford Journal of Law and Religion. 2 (1): 72–97. 2013. doi:10.1093/ojlr/rws040.
- "The Ritual Birth of Sense". Telos. 2013 (162): 29–55. 2013. doi:10.3817/0313162029. S2CID 147453751.
- "Matter and Mattering: the Metaphysics of Rowan Williams". Modern Theology. 31 (4): 599–617. 2015. doi:10.1111/moth.12187. ISSN 0266-7177.
- "The role of affinity and asymmetry in Plato's Lysis". International Journal of Philosophy and Theology. 81 (1): 1–17. 2018. doi:10.1080/21692327.2018.1519456. S2CID 171880813.
- "The Phenomenological Given and the Hermeneutic Exchange: Which Holds Priority?". Revista Portuguesa de Filosofia. 76 (2/3): 715–728. 2020. doi:10.17990/RPF/2020_76_2_0715. JSTOR 26922247. S2CID 226017103.
- "Melancholy, Narcissism and Hope in Truth". Religions. 11 (6): 312. 2020. doi:10.3390/rel11060312.
- — (November 2021). "Truth as conformation in Herbert of Cherbury". New Blackfriars. 102 (1102): 857–872.

== See also ==
- Platonism
- Postmodern theology

Academic offices
Preceded by Sarah Coakley	Norris–Hulse Professor of Divinity; 2018–present	Incumbent
