= The Critic (21st-century magazine) =

21st-century British conservative magazine

- April 2021 cover issue
- Editor: Graham Stewart
- Online Editor: Ben Sixsmith
- Associate Editor: Sebastian Milbank
- Former editors: Michael Mosbacher Christopher Montgomery
- Categories: Culture; Politics; Art; Literature
- Frequency: Monthly
- Format: A4
- Paid circulation: 8,950
- Unpaid circulation: 10,704
- Total circulation: 19,654 (November–December 2020)
- Founded: November 2019
- First issue: November 2019
- Company: Locomotive 6960 Ltd
- Country: United Kingdom
- Based in: London
- Language: English
- Website: thecritic.co.uk
- ISSN: 2633-2655
- OCLC: 1140170196

The Critic is a British conservative (Note: Sources describing The Critic as conservative:) monthly political and cultural magazine. The magazine was founded in November 2019, with Michael Mosbacher, former editor of Standpoint, and Christopher Montgomery, a strategist with the European Research Group of Eurosceptic Tory MPs, as co-editors. It was funded by its owner Jeremy Hosking, a City of London financier and donor to Reform UK, the Conservative party, and Laurence Fox's Reclaim Party, who had previously donated to Standpoint.

Contributors include David Starkey, Peter Hitchens, Douglas Murray, Toby Young, Patrick Kidd, Yuan Yi Zhu and Robert Hutton.

== History ==
Founding co-editor Michael Mosbacher said that Jeremy Hosking had been unwilling to continue funding Standpoint after its board resisted Hosking's demand for more "culture wars content". Mosbacher said of Hosking, "He's a strong Brexiteer, Eurosceptic and right-of-centre, but we are not trying to fit into that narrowly".

Mosbacher characterised The Critic as covering the cultural issues that underpin Brexit. The Times Literary Supplement described it as having a resemblance to The Spectator, with a mission "to criticize the critics". An editorial from the first issue in 2019 attacked "the closed mind", whose "high priests" are found in the universities, "the civil service, the BBC, the courts, the churches, the arts and the quangos". The Critic has been described as combining "more radical forms of populism and more communitarian forms of conservatism", and "[flirting] with the outer-most limits of respectable nationalism". It is considered to be opposed to net-zero targets, and "wokeness".

In January 2020, Mosbacher said that the magazine planned to introduce a paywall if subscriber numbers increased to allow the magazine to become self-sufficient.

An April 2020 article by John McTernan, former political strategist for Tony Blair, encouraged Keir Starmer to purge "Corbynistas" from the Labour party, saying that "there's no problem with a witch-hunt when there really are witches to hunt".

In July 2020, after historian David Starkey was forced to apologise for an interview comment in which he referred to "so many damn blacks in Africa", The Critic decided to retain him as a columnist, expressing opposition to cancel culture. The Sunday Times noted that Starkey's column in the then latest issue of The Critic concerned Black Lives Matter.

== Reception ==
In his essay wishing success for the new publication, David Goodhart, founder of Prospect, remarked, "Does the world need another magazine of tastefully-written, somewhat contrarian, conservatively-inclined thinking? Probably not." Peter Wilby of the New Statesman responded, "I would say probably yes, so why do we never get one?"

Solomon Hughes in the Morning Star derided The Critic, along with Standpoint and UnHerd, as "rich men's megaphones", which in contrast to left-wing publications, "rely on millionaires more than actual readers". He said that such magazines are treated seriously by the mainstream press in part because of their "glossy" presentation, but more so "because they will pay a slumming mainstream journalist very well".

Josh White, writing in Battleground, said, "Any Conservative who is aggrieved by the lack of social cohesion in the wake of austerity may pick up the mag and feel his (usually his) prejudices reaffirmed".

openDemocracy criticised Hosking's opposition to net-zero, and that of the publications he funds, noting his substantial financial interest in the fossil fuel industry.
