= Radical orthodoxy =

Christian theological and philosophical school of thought

Radical Orthodoxy is a Christian theological and philosophical school of thought which makes use of postmodern philosophy to reject the paradigm of modernity. The movement was founded by John Milbank and others and takes its name from the title of a collection of essays published by Routledge in 1999: Radical Orthodoxy: A New Theology, edited by Milbank, Catherine Pickstock, and Graham Ward. Although the principal founders of the movement are Anglicans, radical orthodoxy includes theologians from a number of ecclesial traditions.

== Beginnings ==
Radical Orthodoxy's beginnings are found in the Radical Orthodoxy series of books, the first of which (Radical Orthodoxy: A New Theology) was edited by John Milbank, Catherine Pickstock, and Graham Ward. Milbank's Theology and Social Theory (1990), while not part of this series, is considered the first significant text of the movement.

Radical Orthodoxy first arose out of John Milbank's idea that, amid the growing influences of postmodernism, Christian theology ought to again arise and take pride of place at the peak of human understanding. Due to the revelation of postmodern philosophy's critique of reason, Milbank argues, theology can reject secularism and again claim its historical premise of transcendence.

== Main ideas ==
Milbank has summarized radical orthodoxy in seven interrelated main ideas:

1. The denial of a clean distinction between faith and reason, or reason and revelation, but rather that human knowledge is knowledge only insofar as it is illuminated by divine truth.
2. All of creation can only be understood as participating in God's being, and as such, gleans for us glimpses of the nature of God, without fully comprehending it.
3. Human constructs (e.g. culture, community, language, history, technology) also participate in the being of God. It is neither "incidental to the truth" nor "a barrier against it".
4. Theology functions through theurgy, "a co-operation between human and divine work", which both ultimately belong to God. This work (and its exchanges) is called liturgy, where "a collective human action invites the divine descent".
5. A rejection of postmodern nihilism, which concludes that since there is no grounding for truth in "an absolutely certain intuitive presence", then there is no such thing as truth to begin with. Radical orthodoxy concedes that truth has no absolute grounding or finite certainty, but reads this lack of grounding as orienting the finite toward the eternal. Rationalism is thus evil because it makes humanity its own arbiter of truth, thereby contradicting the incarnate God's revelation of his own eternal truth. This can be seen throughout all history, but it is most centralized in the Church.
6. "Without God, people see a nullity at the heart of things. They regard death as more real than life. This means that body gets hollowed out and abstraction becomes the true permanent reality, as in 'all is decay'. Only a belief in transcendence and participation in transcendence actually secures the reality of matter and the body. God transcends body, but is, as it were, even more body than body. So radical orthodoxy insists on a valuation of the body, sexuality, the sensory and the aesthetic"; while still sustaining that asceticism as severe discipline of the body which orients itself to God "is necessary to preserve this valuation".
7. Humans also participate in the being of nature and of other humans. Because of this, salvation is as much cosmic as it is communal. Salvation then brings forth "a liberation of nature from terror and distress" to its fullest harmony and beauty, and a maximally democratic and socialist cooperation between humans, "on the basis of a common recognition of true virtue and excellence". To this end, the Church foreshadows the fully realized kingdom of God.

Underlying these is the return to theology as the "queen of the sciences" or the highest of all possible human knowledge, and a postmodern reaffirmation of ancient and medieval orthodox theologies.

== Influences ==
Henri de Lubac's theological work on the distinction of nature and grace has been influential in the movement's articulation of ontology. The strong critique of liberalism found in much of radical orthodoxy has its origin in the work of Karl Barth. The Oxford Movement and the Cambridge Platonists are also key influences of radical orthodoxy.

Milbank's rejection of both liberation theology and political theology hinges on his critiques of Georg Wilhelm Friedrich Hegel and Karl Marx, to whom he attributes an "original violence" at the core of their philosophical constructions. Instead of original violence, radical orthodoxy advocates for "harmonious difference" in God's creation at the core of reality.

A form of Neoplatonism plays a significant role in radical orthodoxy. Syrian Iamblichus of Chalcis (c. 245–325) and the Byzantine Proclus (412–485) are occasionally sourced, while the theology of Augustine of Hippo, Gregory of Nyssa, Thomas Aquinas, Nicholas of Cusa, and Meister Eckhart is often drawn upon.

One of the key tasks of radical orthodoxy is to criticize the philosophy of Duns Scotus. Duns Scotus's theory that the term being is used univocally of God and creatures is often presented as the precursor of modernity.

== Reception ==
The emergence of radical orthodoxy was met with both acclimation and trepidation, and was viewed as a challenge to the liberal theological establishment. The radical orthodoxy movement was also noted for the "verve" which it exhibited in combating the dominant forces in British theology.

Several theologians have written against the claims of the movement, with special attention being paid to the way in which historical theology is employed by Pickstock, Milbank, and others. The reading of Duns Scotus advanced by the radical orthodoxy has been criticized by Daniel Horan and Thomas Williams, both of whom claim that the radical orthodox movement confuses Scotus' epistemology and semantics with ontology.

== See also ==
- Neo-orthodoxy
- New Monasticism
- Paleo-orthodoxy
- Postliberal theology
- Postmodern Christianity
