= Neil Lebhar =

American Anglican bishop

The Right Reverend Neil Lebhar
- Bishop of the Gulf Atlantic
- Church: Anglican Church in North America
- Diocese: Gulf Atlantic Diocese
- In office: 2010–2022
- Predecessor: See created
- Successor: Alex Farmer

Orders
- Consecration: February 13, 2010 by Archbishop Robert Duncan

Personal details
- Born: August 29, 1950 (age 75)

Neil Gedney Lebhar (born 1950) is an American Anglican bishop. He was the first bishop of the Gulf Atlantic Diocese, a newly formed diocese of the Anglican Church in North America. He has been rector of the Anglican Church of the Redeemer in Jacksonville, Florida.

== Early life and career ==
Lebhar was raised in Westport, Connecticut, the eldest son of a physician. He graduated from the Loomis School, where, as a senior, he was converted to Christianity in 1967 through FOCUS under the ministry of future Episcopal bishop John W. Howe.

Lebhar married his wife, Marcia, in 1971. He graduated from Princeton University in 1972, served as field director for FOCUS, and received seminary degrees from Gordon-Conwell Theological Seminary and Virginia Theological Seminary. In 1979, Lebhar was appointed associate rector at Truro Church under John W. Howe. He served there until being called as rector of the Church of the Redeemer in Jacksonville, then a parish of the Episcopal Diocese of Florida. Lebhar also served on the boards of Church's Ministry Among Jewish People and Shoresh, and as vice chairman of the 2000 Jacksonville Billy Graham Crusade.

== Anglican realignment ==
In 2007, objecting to the consecration of Gene Robinson and the theological views of TEC, Lebhar and several other clergy and parishes left the Diocese of Florida and sought canonical affiliation with the Church of Uganda. On March 25, 2008, Lebhar and 21 other clergy were deposed by Florida Bishop John Howard.

Lebhar was elected the first bishop of the newly formed Gulf Atlantic Diocese on August 29, 2009. He was consecrated on February 13, 2010, at Jacksonville's Holy Family Catholic Church by chief consecrator Robert Duncan. The co-consecrators were John Guernsey, John E. Miller III, Martyn Minns, and Joel Obetia, who had served as Lebhar's bishop in Uganda.

Lebhar continues to serve in parish ministry in Jacksonville in addition to his episcopal duties, which he has said is a good model for the ministry of a bishop. In 2012, Lebhar received AMIA bishop John E. Miller III and the parishes under his care as a temporary "assisting bishop" in the Gulf Atlantic Diocese.

== Notes ==
Anglican Communion titles
Preceded by See created	I Bishop of the Gulf Atlantic; 2010–2022	Succeeded by Alex Farmer
