= St. Peter's Anglican Cathedral (Tallahassee, Florida) =

Anglican cathedral in Tallahassee, Florida

St. Peter's Cathedral, Tallahassee
- St. Peter's Anglican Cathedral
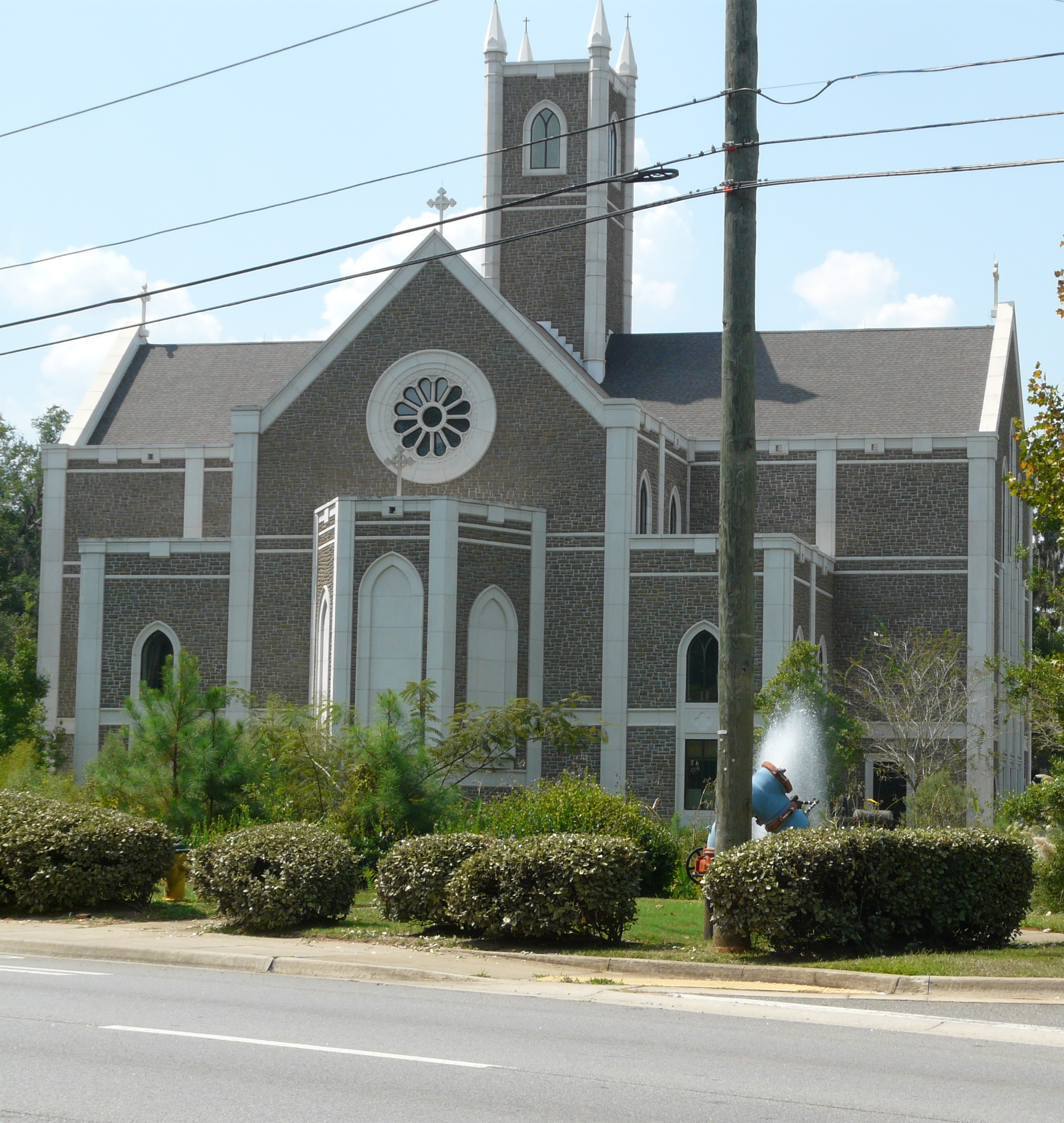
- St. Peter's Cathedral photographed from the east in 2025.
- St. Peter's Cathedral, Tallahassee
- 30.534137°N 84.233874°W
- Location: Tallahassee, Florida
- Country: United States
- Denomination: Anglican Church in North America
- Tradition: Anglican
- Website: stpetersfl.com

History
- Dedication: Peter the Apostle
- Consecrated: 14 June 2014

Architecture
- Style: Neo-Gothic
- Years built: 2012 – 2014
- Groundbreaking: 1 December 2012
- Completed: 14 June 2014
- Construction cost: 12 Million USD

Administration
- Province: ACNA
- Diocese: Gulf Atlantic Diocese

Clergy
- Bishop: Alex Farmer
- Dean: Marcus Kaiser

St. Peter's Anglican Cathedral, properly the Cathedral Church of St. Peter, is an Anglican cathedral in Tallahassee, Florida, USA, dedicated to Saint Peter and seat of the Bishop of the Gulf Atlantic Diocese of the Anglican Church in North America. It was built in 2012–2014 to provide a home for the young parish of St. Peter's Anglican Church, and was made the cathedral of its diocese at the Diocesan Synod on 11 November 2017. From 2018 – 2020, Archbishop Emeritus Robert Duncan served as Bishop-in-Residence and interim rector of the cathedral.

It is built in a Neo-Gothic style, heavily featuring insulating concrete form construction. Included in the foundations are several handmade bricks from Uganda, which were included to show the importance of the support St. Peter's received in its early years from the Church of Uganda and Bishop Jackson Nzerebende. Building began on 1 December 2012 and was completed just prior to its consecration by Archbishop Robert Duncan on 14 June 2014. In addition to Archbishop Duncan, Bishops Lebhar and Nzerebende were in attendance at the consecration.

== Dean and chapter ==
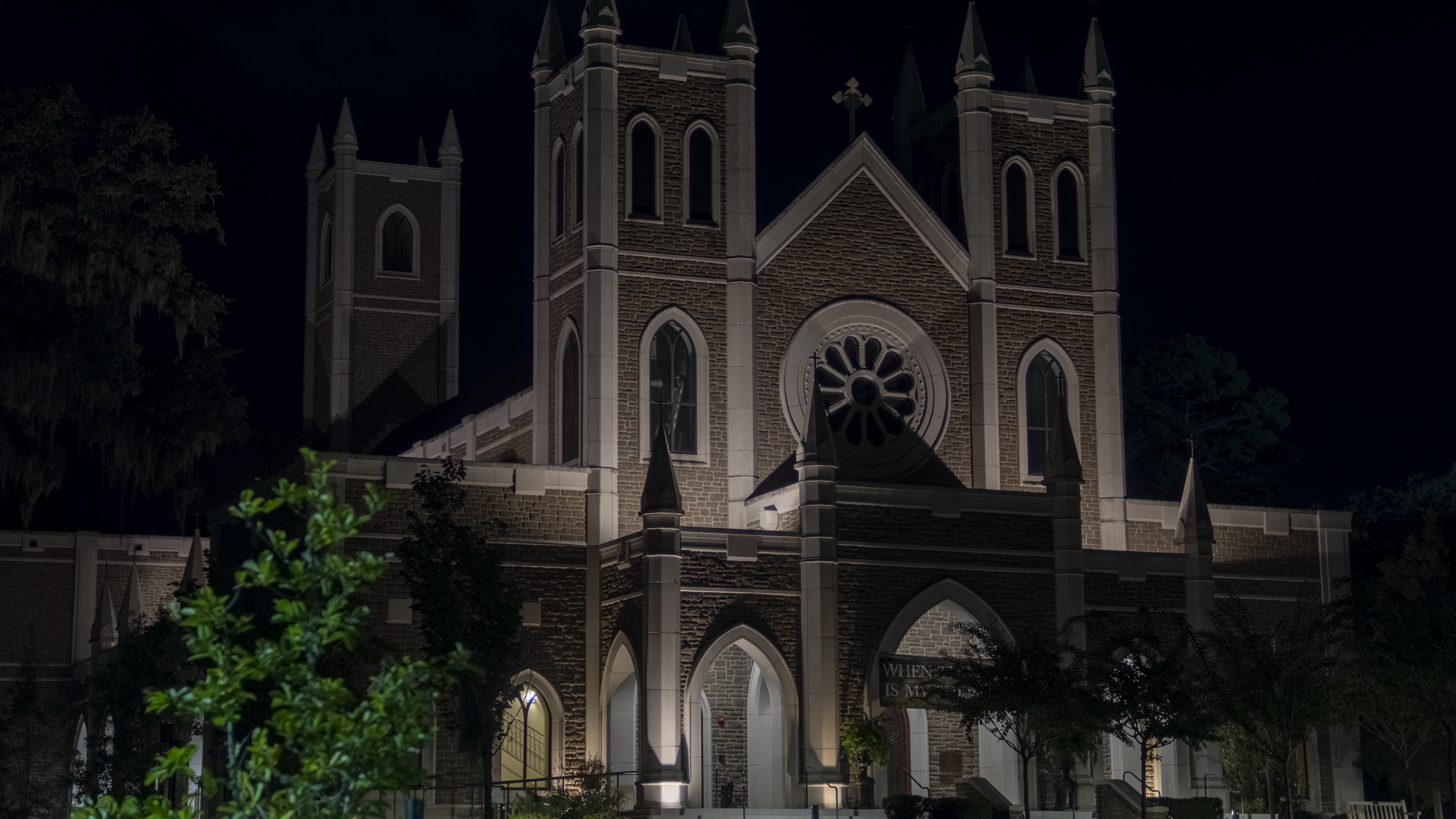
The west front of St Peter's Cathedral after a compline service.

As of February 2026:

- Dean: The Very Rev'd Marcus Kaiser (since 20 June 2021 installation)
- Canon Theologian: The Rev'd Canon Dr. Michael Petty
- Canon for Missions & Evangelism: The Rev'd Canon Herb Bailey
- Canon for Pastoral Care & Family Ministries: The Rev'd Canon William Krizner
- Canon for Spiritual Formation & Discipleship: The Rev'd Canon Jonathan Kanary

== Bells ==
As of 2021, St. Peter's Anglican Cathedral has 4 bells, pitched across an A Major triad, that are hung in the North Tower.

== See also ==
- Gothic Revival architecture
- Anglican Church in North America
