= Alex Farmer (bishop) =

American Anglican bishop

The Right Reverend Alex Farmer
- Bishop of the Gulf Atlantic
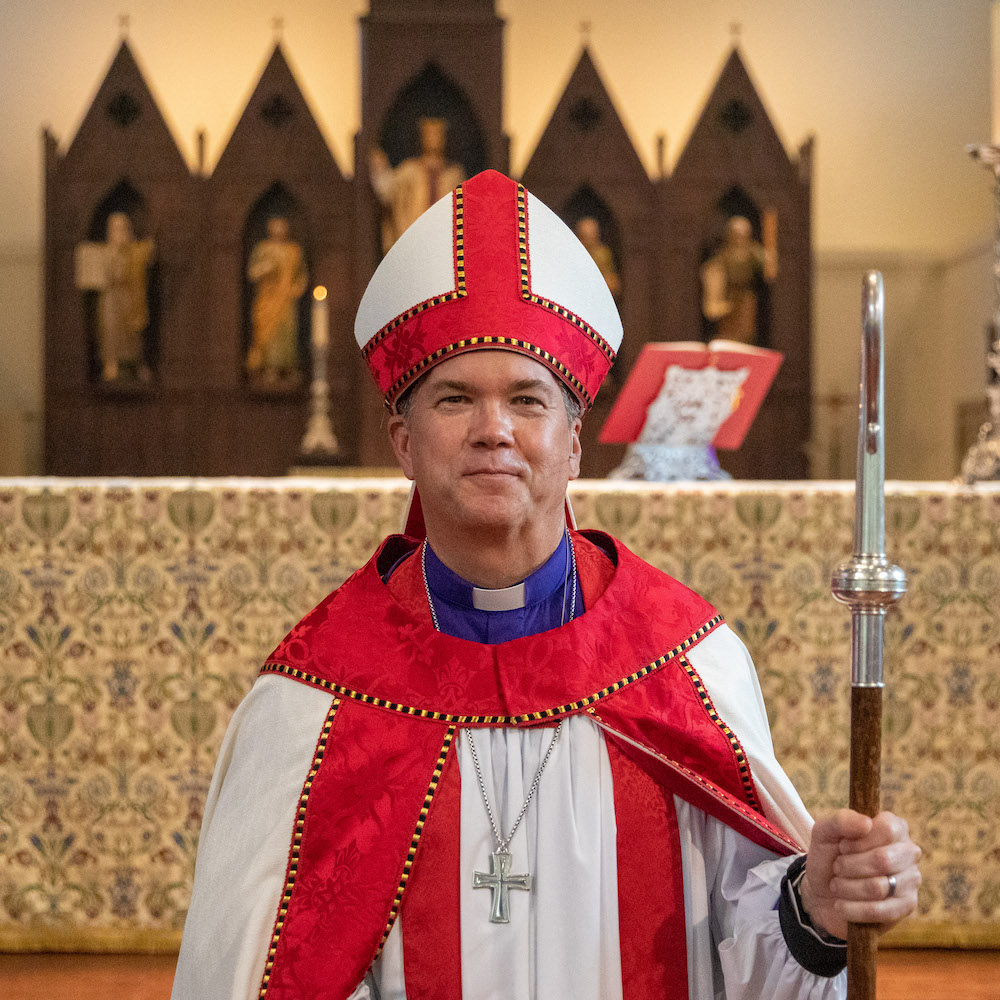
- Church: Anglican Church in North America
- See: Gulf Atlantic Diocese
- In office: 2022–present
- Predecessor: Neil Lebhar
- Successor: Incumbent

Orders
- Ordination: 2000 (deacon); 2000 (priest)
- Consecration: August 27, 2022 by Archbishop Foley Beach

Personal details
- Born: 1966 (age 59–60)

Charles Alexander Farmer (born 1966) is an American Anglican bishop. He is the second bishop of the Gulf Atlantic Diocese, a diocese of the Anglican Church in North America. He was formerly rector of the Servants of Christ Anglican Church, Gainesville, Florida.

== Early life and career ==
Farmer graduated from Jacksonville University in 1989, with a Bachelor of Arts in History. He married his wife, Jody, in 1991 and earned the Master of Divinity degree from Trinity School for Ministry in 2000. In 2000, Farmer was appointed associate rector at All Souls Episcopal Church, Jacksonville, Florida. He served there until being called as rector of St Michael's Episcopal Church, Gainesville in August 2002.

== Anglican realignment ==
In 2006, objecting to the consecration of Gene Robinson and the theological views of TEC, Farmer and around 140 parishioners left the Diocese of Florida, reorganizing from St Michael's into Servants of Christ Anglican Church.

Farmer was elected the second bishop of the Gulf Atlantic Diocese of the Anglican Church in North America on May 14, 2022. He was consecrated on August 27, 2022, at St Peter's Cathedral, Tallahassee, by chief consecrator Foley Beach. The co-consecrators were Neil Lebhar, John E. Miller III, and Steve Breedlove.

== Notes ==
Anglican Communion titles
Preceded by Neil Lebhar	II Bishop of the Gulf Atlantic; 2022–present	Succeeded by Incumbent
