= Gulf Atlantic Diocese =

Diocese of the Anglican Church in North America

Diocese of Gulf Atlantic
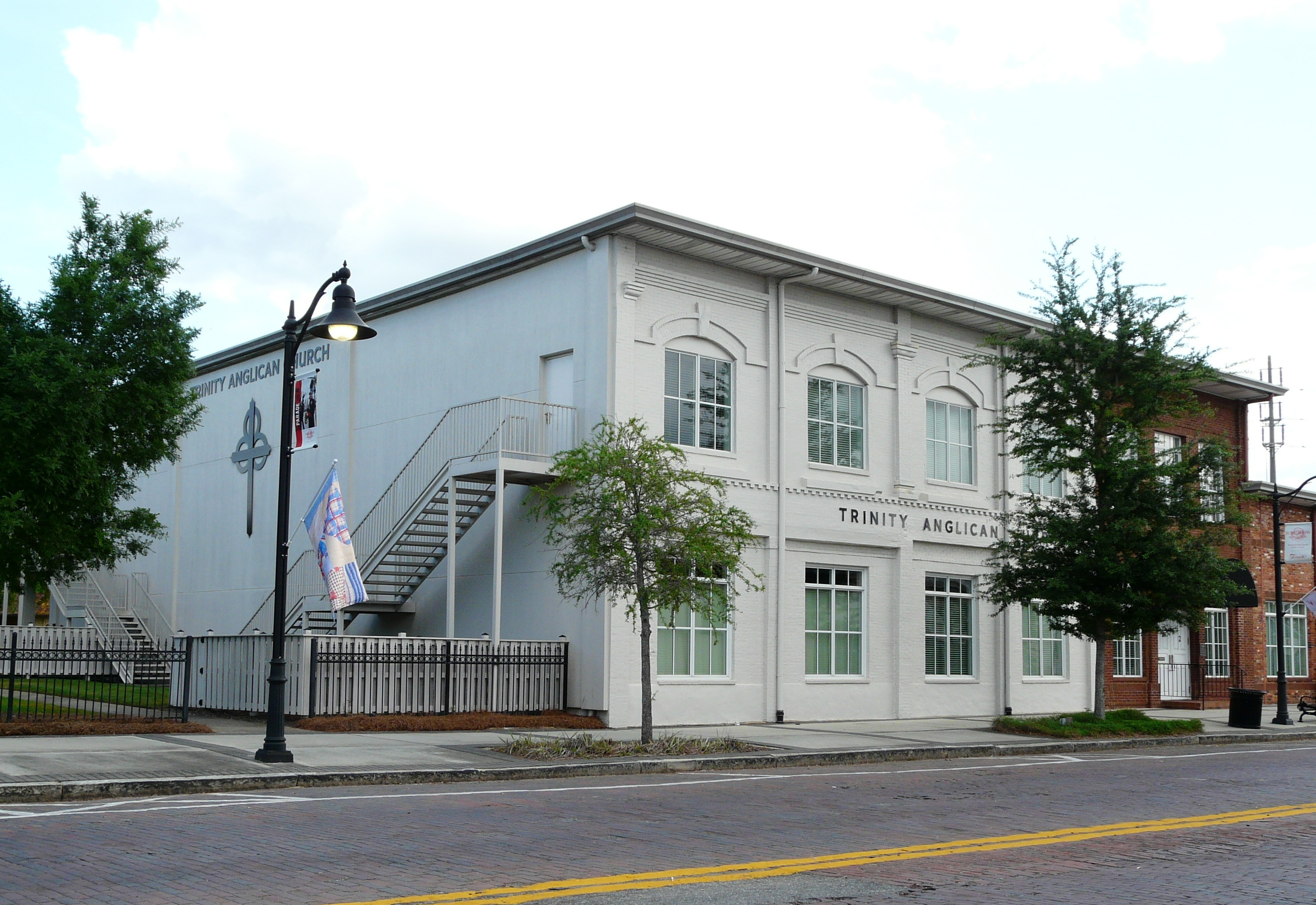
- Trinity Anglican Church in Thomasville, Georgia

Location
- Ecclesiastical province: Anglican Church in North America

Statistics
- Parishes: 34 (2025)
- Members: 6,308 (2025)

Information
- Rite: Anglican
- Cathedral: St. Peter's Cathedral

Current leadership
- Bishop: Alex Farmer

Website
- Gulf Atlantic Diocese Official Website

The Gulf Atlantic Diocese is a diocese of the Anglican Church in North America, comprising 34 congregations in the American states of Alabama, Florida, Georgia, Louisiana and Mississippi. Florida is the state with the most congregations. The diocese was originally divided into five deaneries: Gainesville, Jacksonville, Savannah, Tallahassee and Western. The diocese later changed the division into four deaneries, Central, Northeastern, Southern and Western.

== History ==
The Gulf Atlantic Diocese origin goes back to the founding of the Anglican Alliance, which took place at the third diocesan chapter of the American Anglican Council, in November 2001, having Stephen Jecko, Bishop of Florida, as the main proponent. His main purposes were stated as to enforce what he and others saw as "orthodox Anglican belief" against "liberal innovations" in the Episcopal Church. The Episcopal Diocese of Florida was then one of the main proponents of this claimed orthodoxy among the Episcopalian dioceses.

The diocese was very critical of the consecration of Gene Robinson as the first openly non-celibate gay bishop of the Episcopal Church in 2003. Stephen Jecko stepped down in 2004, after joining Robert Duncan, Bishop of Pittsburgh, and an aggregate of 12 seceding Episcopalian bishops to create the Network of Anglican Communion Dioceses and Parishes. Jecko's successor as bishop was John Howard, who despite sharing similar beliefs with the seceding bishops and parishes, declined to join the Network. In the Spring of 2005, Six clergy who objected to the innovations in the Episcopal church met to discuss how best to address the crisis. A decision was made at this meeting to appeal to Bishop Howard to allow for alternative oversight from a like-minded Bishop, either in the United States or in another country. Known as the "Florida Six" these clergy formed the center of a movement that eventually would lead to the formation of a new diocese and the establishment of the Anglican Church in North America. In October of 2005, another move was led by Eric Dudley who left the Episcopal Diocese of Florida to form a new church, St. Peter's Anglican Church, under the auspices of the Church of Uganda, a move that was coordinated and supported by Stephen Jecko. Other seceding Episcopalians and Anglicans created the Anglican Alliance of North Florida.

After the birth of the Anglican Church in North America, the now called Anglican Alliance of North Florida and South Georgia reunited at Advent Christian Village, in Dowling Park, Florida, in a move to pass from a "Diocese in creation" to a full diocese in the newly created church, on August 29, 2009. In the reunion, 47 clergy delegates and 39 lay delegates were present in representation of 20 churches. The Inaugural Synod ratified a Constitution and Canons, electing Neil G. Lebhar as the first bishop of the new diocese. At the final meeting, the name of Gulf Atlantic Diocese was chosen for the new diocese.

The Provincial Council of the Anglican Church in North America, held on December 11, 2009, in Toronto, Canada, accepted as a full member the Gulf Atlantic Diocese and recognized Neil Lebhar as their first bishop.

On April 30, 2012, Lebhar announced in his pastoral letter that John E. Miller III, from Melbourne, Florida, of the Anglican Mission in the Americas, recently disaffiliated from the Anglican Church of Rwanda, would be received at the Gulf Atlantic Diocese as an Assisting Bishop for at least six months, as a temporary measure until the future of the AMiA is defined. It was also suggested the possible affiliation of some of his 20 congregations to the Diocese. Miller, as an Assisting Bishop, a newly created position, will be in charge of the process of transition of the AMiA parishes.

The diocese announced that St. Peter's Anglican Church in Tallahassee, Florida, had been declared the new cathedral, St Peter's Cathedral, in January 2018.

On 27 August 2022, the Rev. Charles Alexander Farmer was ordained to the episcopacy and consecrated as the second Ordinary of the diocese at St Peter's Cathedral.

== Parishes ==
In 2025, the Gulf Atlantic Diocese had 34 congregations, down 15% from 2022. Its membership was 6,308 (down 3% from 2022), while average Sunday attendance was 4,069 (up 18% from 2022). Notable parishes in the diocese include:

Church	Image	City	Year founded	Year completed	Notes
Christ Church Anglican		Savannah, Georgia	1733	1913	National Historic District contributing property
St. Peter's Cathedral		Tallahassee, Florida	2005	2014	Diocesan cathedral
