= Anglican Church in North America =

Anglican realignment province

- Abbreviation: ACNA
- Classification: Protestant (with Anglo-Catholic, charismatic and evangelical orientations)
- Orientation: Anglican
- Scripture: Holy Bible
- Theology: Anglican doctrine
- Polity: Episcopal
- Archbishop: Steve Wood (inhibited since November 16, 2025)
- Dean of the province: Julian Dobbs
- Executive director: Deborah Tepley
- Associations: GAFCON, Global South
- Full communion: Evangelical Lutheran Church of Latvia, Philippine Independent Catholic Church, Episcopal Missionary Church, Reformed Episcopal Church
- Region: Canada, United States, Mexico, Cuba
- Origin: June 22, 2009; St. Vincent's Cathedral, Bedford, Texas, United States
- Separated from: Anglican Church of Canada and Episcopal Church (United States)
- Merger of: Common Cause Partnership
- Absorbed: PEARUSA (2016); Episcopal Diocese of South Carolina (2017)
- Congregations: 1,004 (2025)
- Members: 129,997 (2025)
- Official website: anglicanchurch.net

The Anglican Church in North America (ACNA) is a Christian denomination in the Anglican tradition in the United States and Canada. It also includes ten congregations in Mexico, two mission churches in Guatemala, and a missionary diocese in Cuba. Headquartered in Ambridge, Pennsylvania, the church reported 1,005 congregations and 129,868 members in 2025. The ACNA is not a member church of the Anglican Communion but has an association with a number of provinces and leaders of the communion.

The ACNA was founded in 2009 by theological conservatives of the Episcopal Church in the United States and the Anglican Church of Canada, who were dissatisfied with doctrinal and social teachings in their former churches, especially regarding the position of women and the ordination of an openly gay bishop, which they considered too liberal and contradictory to traditional Anglican belief (similarly to the Reformed Episcopal Church, which had separated from the Episcopal Church in 1873). Immediately prior to 2009, these conservative Anglicans received support from a number of Anglican churches (provinces) outside of North America, especially in the Global South. Several Episcopal dioceses and many individual parishes in both Canada and the United States in the early 2000s voted to transfer their allegiance to Anglican provinces in South America and Africa. In 2009 many North American Anglican groups which had moved to the South American and African jurisdictions, however, united to form the Anglican Church in North America leading to currently established (as of 2025) movement.

The first archbishop of the ACNA was Robert Duncan, who was succeeded by Foley Beach in 2014. In June 2024, the College of Bishops elected Steve Wood as the third archbishop of the ACNA. Authority was transferred to him during the closing Eucharist at the ACNA Assembly 2024 conference in Latrobe, Pennsylvania. In October 2025, Wood became the first archbishop in the history of the denomination to face an ecclesastical presentment over allegations of sexual harassment, bullying of church staff, and plagiarism. Wood was inhibited on November 16, 2025 by Julian Dobbs, the newly appointed dean and acting archbishop of the ACNA, who subsequently faced allegations of financial misconduct including at a UK-based charity undergoing an active police investigation.

The Anglican Church in North America is a Confessing Anglican denomination, being a member of the Global Fellowship of Confessing Anglicans (GAFCON). Unlike the Episcopal Church and the Anglican Church of Canada, the ACNA is not a member province of the Anglican Communion. From its inception, the Anglican Church in North America has sought full communion with those provinces of the Anglican Communion "that hold and maintain the Historic Faith, Doctrine, Sacraments and Discipline of the One, Holy, Catholic, and Apostolic Church"; and maintains full communion with some of the Anglican Global South primates.

The ACNA has attempted to incorporate the full spectrum of conservative Anglicanism within Canada and the United States. As a result, it accommodates Anglo-Catholic, charismatic, and evangelical theological orientations. It also includes those who oppose and those who support the ordination of women. Women can serve as clergy members in some dioceses, while other dioceses maintain an exclusively male clergy. Women are ineligible to serve as bishops. This disagreement over the ordination of women has led to "impaired communion" among some dioceses. The ACNA defines Christian marriage exclusively as a lifelong union between a man and a woman and holds that there are only two expressions of faithful sexuality: lifelong marriage between a man and a woman or abstinence. The church opposes abortion.

== History ==
The Anglican Church in North America was founded by Anglicans who had left the Anglican Church of Canada and the Episcopal Church in the United States over concerns that the teaching of those churches had grown more liberal. The new body charged that the two existing churches "have increasingly accommodated and incorporated un-Biblical, un-Anglican practices and teaching".

Two major events that contributed to ACNA's formation both involved human sexuality. The first was the 2002 decision of the Diocese of New Westminster in Canada to authorize a rite of blessing for same-sex unions; the second was the General Convention's ratification of the election of Gene Robinson, an openly gay non-celibate man, as Bishop of New Hampshire the following year. Conservative opposition to both the Episcopal Church's 1979 edition of the Book of Common Prayer and to the ordination of women priests had led to the founding of an earlier wave of independent Anglican churches, often called the Continuing Anglican movement.

=== Common Cause Partnership (2004–2008) ===
In June 2004, the leaders of six conservative Anglican organizations—the Anglican Communion Network, the Reformed Episcopal Church, the Anglican Mission in America, Forward in Faith North America, the Anglican Province of America, and the American Anglican Council—sent a public letter to the Archbishop of Canterbury, pledging "to make common cause for the gospel of Jesus Christ and common cause for a united, missionary and orthodox Anglicanism in North America". They called their alliance the Common Cause Partnership and drafted a theological statement in 2006.

In September 2007, fifty-one bishops met in Pittsburgh, Pennsylvania, to discern direction and to bind themselves constitutionally, saying they intended to found an "Anglican union". Some of the bishops present were foreign bishops, including a retired archbishop. Features of note from the result of the initial meeting include a broad sharing of clergy between the varied groups, an intention to be a "missionary" or church-planting entity, and an intention, after a brief time, to seek international organizational recognition.

Key members of the partnership participated in the June 2008 meeting of conservative Anglicans in Jerusalem, the Global Anglican Future Conference, which in turn prompted the formation of the Global Fellowship of Confessing Anglicans. A final statement issued by the conference stated that: "we believe the time is now ripe for the formation of a province in North America for the federation currently known as Common Cause Partnership to be recognised by the Primates' Council" of the Anglican Communion.

The Anglican Province of America participated in the partnership until July 2008.

=== Establishment (2008–2009) ===
In December 2008, the partnership met in West Chicago, Illinois, as a constitutional convention to form a "separate ecclesiastical structure in North America" for Anglicans distinct from the Episcopal Church and the Anglican Church of Canada. At the conventions, the partnership's executive committee approved a provisional constitution and canons for the new church which were to be submitted for formal adoption at the new church's first provincial assembly.

The members of the Common Cause Partnership at the founding of the ACNA were:

- The American Anglican Council
- The Anglican Coalition in Canada
- The Anglican Communion Network
- The Anglican Mission in the Americas (AMiA)
- The Anglican Network in Canada
- The Convocation of Anglicans in North America
- Forward in Faith North America
- The Missionary Convocation of Kenya
- The Missionary Convocation of the Southern Cone
- The Missionary Convocation of Uganda
- The Reformed Episcopal Church
- The Reformed Communion

==== Inaugural assembly ====
On June 22, 2009, delegates of the ACNA's founding bodies met at St. Vincent's Cathedral in Bedford, Texas, for an inaugural provincial assembly to ratify its constitution and canons. At this meeting, a number of major steps were taken to officially establish the new denomination, including the election of Robert Duncan, bishop of the Anglican Diocese of Pittsburgh, as archbishop.

Rick Warren, a leading American evangelical, and Metropolitan Jonah Paffhausen, leader of the Orthodox Church in America, addressed the audience. There were nine provinces in the Anglican Communion that sent official representatives to the assembly, namely the Church of the Province of West Africa, the Church of Nigeria, the Church of Uganda, the Anglican Church of Kenya, represented by Archbishop Benjamin Nzimbi, the Anglican Province of the Southern Cone, including Archbishop Gregory Venables, the Episcopal Church in Jerusalem and the Middle East, the Church of the Province of Myanmar, the Church of the Province of South East Asia and the Church of the Province of Rwanda.

Other ecumenical observers included Bishop Walter Grundorf of the Anglican Province of America, Samuel Nafzger of the Lutheran Church–Missouri Synod, and Bishop Kevin Vann of the Roman Catholic Diocese of Fort Worth.

Leaders from three Anglican provinces, John Chew of the Church of the Province of South East Asia, Archbishop Peter Jensen of the Anglican Diocese of Sydney and the Fellowship of Confessing Anglicans and Mouneer Anis, Presiding Bishop of the Episcopal Church in Jerusalem and the Middle East, formally announced support for the ACNA. From England, Bishop Wallace Benn and Archdeacon Michael Lawson sent greetings from the Church of England Evangelical Council.

=== Robert Duncan's primacy (2009–2014) ===
==== Separation of the AMiA ====
The Anglican Mission in the Americas (AMiA) was a founding member of the Anglican Church in North America and, at the same time, maintained its status as a mission of the Church of the Province of Rwanda. This "dual citizenship" was defined by protocol among the Province of Rwanda, the Anglican Mission, and the ACNA.

However, in a May 18, 2010, communiqué, the Anglican Mission announced its decision to transition from full ACNA membership to "ministry partner" status, a designation provided for in the governing structure of the ACNA, and remain a part of the Rwandan province. Reasons cited for the change were that the "dual citizenship" model had caused "significant confusion within the Anglican Mission and the ACNA regarding membership in two provinces, and more importantly, is inconsistent with the Constitution and Canons of the Province of the Anglican Church in Rwanda".

On December 20, 2011, Archbishop Duncan announced that, due to the resignation of the majority of Anglican Mission bishops from the Province of Rwanda on December 5, the Anglican Mission had lost its "ministry partner" status with the ACNA and that most of AMiA's bishops had lost their status in the ACNA's College of Bishops. Archbishop Onesphore Rwaje of the Anglican Church of Rwanda and Archbishop Duncan of the Anglican Church in North America issued a Joint Communiqué on April 28, 2012, to address the future of the AMiA. Meanwhile, the House of the Bishops of Rwanda decided to establish the Missionary District in North America (PEARUSA) to pursue the same work in the United States. The AMiA members were given three alternatives: join the PEARUSA, join another Anglican jurisdiction through letters dimissory, or remain in the AMiA. A deadline of August 31, 2012, was established for the clergy and the congregations of the AMiA to decide their future. On April 29, 2012, Archbishop Henri Isingoma expressed his official approval for the temporary admission of the AMiA at the Anglican Church of Congo until its future was clarified. Bishop Chuck Murphy, of the AMiA, expressed his will that the fracture between the AMiA and the ACNA could be solved in an answer letter to Archbishop Duncan, on September 8, 2012.

=== Foley Beach's primacy (2014–2024) ===
Bishop Foley Beach of the Anglican Diocese of the South was elected to succeed Robert Duncan as archbishop of the ACNA on June 21, 2014.

==== PEARUSA ====
On August 14, 2014, a reopening of conversations was announced between ACNA and AMiA "to discuss broken relationships, and to find ways that produce a faithful witness to Christ that has been undermined in the past". The meeting in which these conversations were started was attended by representatives of both ACNA and AMiA, including Archbishop Foley Beach and Bishop Philip Jones, who replaced Chuck Murphy in December 2013.

PEARUSA was a missionary district with equivalent status to a diocese. Upon the unanimous vote of ACNA's Provincial Council on June 21, 2016, PEARUSA was fully transferred to ACNA with two of the three former PEARUSA networks (Mid-Atlantic and Northeast, West) becoming full ACNA dioceses known respectively as the Anglican Diocese of Christ Our Hope and the Anglican Diocese of the Rocky Mountains. The former PEARUSA Southeast network did not become a full, separate ACNA diocese. According to a decision that had been reached at their clergy meeting and released on February 8, 2016, the 20 parishes of PEARUSA Southeast were folded into the already existing ACNA dioceses.

==== Diocese of South Carolina and other dioceses ====
The ACNA and the Diocese of South Carolina, which had withdrawn from the Episcopal Church in October 2012 and was under the provisional primatial oversight of the Global South, held a two-day meeting on April 28–29, 2015, at St. Christopher Camp and Conference Center in South Carolina for conversations and examining the "possible compatibility of the ecclesiologies" of both churches. The Diocese of South Carolina Affiliation Task Force recommended the affiliation to the ACNA at their 225th Diocesan Convention, held in Bluffton, on March 12, 2016. The affiliation required approval by two future conventions of the diocese. The Diocese of South Carolina voted unanimously to affiliate with ACNA at their 226th Convention, held in Summerville, on March 11, 2017. ACNA's Provincial Council voted also unanimously to formally receive the Diocese of South Carolina at ACNA's Third Provincial Assembly, meeting in Wheaton, Illinois, on June 27, 2017.

The Reformed Episcopal Diocese of the West became a convocation at the Missionary Diocese of All Saints, in April 2016, due to their small size. The Diocese of Western Canada and Alaska, who had two parishes in British Columbia, and also included the Missionary District of Cuba, was extinct and incorporated in the Diocese of Mid-America, for similar reasons.

==== Impaired communion ====
In 2017, following a five-year task force study on the ordination of women, the ACNA's College of Bishops issued a statement in which it unanimously agreed to continue acknowledging the rights of individual dioceses to ordain women to the priesthood. Afterward, Bishop Jack Iker of Fort Worth—one of the founding members of ACNA—announced on 4 November 2017 that his diocese was in impaired communion with the ACNA dioceses that ordained women. He said: "Most ACNA bishops and dioceses are opposed to women priests, but as it presently stands, the ACNA Constitution says each diocese can decide if it will ordain women priests or not. We now need to work with other dioceses to amend the Constitution to remove this provision". He continued:

We are in a state of impaired communion because of this issue. The Task Force concluded that "both sides cannot be right." At the conclave, I informed the College of Bishops that I will no longer give consent to the election of any bishop who intends to ordain female priests, nor will I attend the consecration of any such bishop-elect in the future. I have notified the Archbishop of my resignation from all the committees to which I had been assigned to signify that it is no longer possible to have "business as usual" in the College of Bishops due to the refusal of those who are in favor of women priests to at least adopt a moratorium on this divisive practice, for the sake of unity. Bishops who continue to ordain women priests in spite of the received tradition are signs of disunity and division.

==== Integration of CANA ====
After the formation of the ACNA, the Church of Nigeria (Anglican Communion) entered into letters of agreement to formalize relationship between the two provinces. The most recent agreement signed by the ACNA and the Church of Nigeria related to three of the four dioceses that resulted from the Convocation of Anglicans in North America activity in the United States. The agreement signed on March 12, 2019, allowed for the Missionary Diocese of the Trinity, the Missionary Diocese of CANA East, and the Missionary Diocese of CANA West to decide their own provincial affiliation. This agreement became necessary as the result of a dispute generated by the election by the Church of Nigeria of four suffragan bishops for the Missionary Diocese of the Trinity, composed mostly of Nigerian expatriates in the United States, without consultation with the ACNA College of Bishops. Until this time, the Church of Nigeria had allowed all four CANA dioceses to be full participating members of the ACNA. On May 21, 2019, the Missionary Diocese of CANA East announced its decision to withdraw from the Church of Nigeria to become solely a diocese of the Anglican Church in North America, with the new name of the Anglican Diocese of the Living Word. The Diocese of CANA West announced their decision to remain a diocese of the Church of Nigeria on May 23, 2019, followed by the Missionary Diocese of the Trinity on the same day. The dioceses remaining with the Church of Nigeria are, by the agreement, considered ministry partners (a formal canonical status) of the ACNA. The fourth diocese, the Diocese of the Armed Forces and Chaplaincy (CANA), which had become the Jurisdiction of the Armed Forces and Chaplaincy (ACNA) in 2014 by a previous letter of agreement between the Church of Nigeria and the ACNA, was unaffected by this latter agreement since the previous agreement regarding Anglican Chaplains had been solidified through changes in the Canons of the ACNA. The Jurisdiction of the Armed Forces and Chaplaincy continues to function as a full diocesan entity of the ACNA, and in concordat with the Church of Nigeria (CANA).

==== "Gay Anglicans" conflict ====
In early 2021, a significant conflict emerged over how to address issues of homosexual identity within the ACNA, sparking international controversy in the Anglican Communion. In January, the ACNA's College of Bishops issued a 3,700 word pastoral statement advising against the usage of the term "gay Christian". This prompted several clergy, including former interim bishop of the Great Lakes and Trinity Anglican Seminary professor Grant LeMarquand, to sign a letter addressed "Dear Gay Anglicans", which committed to making ACNA churches places where "where gay Anglicans can share all of their story, find community, and seek support". The ACNA's archbishop, Foley Beach, responded by characterizing the letter as an "in your face" provocation, writing, "Some individuals have expressed that we are now TEC 2.0. Some think this is going to break the ACNA apart." The letter also attracted criticism from some of the ACNA's international ministry partners, such as Nigerian primate Henry Ndukuba, who described the letter as "a clarion call to recruit gays into ACNA member parishes" and a sign that "the deadly 'virus' of homosexuality has infiltrated ACNA", writing, "a Gay is a Gay, they cannot be rightly described otherwise". This in turn drew sharp criticism from the leader of the Anglican Communion, Archbishop of Canterbury Justin Welby, who condemned Ndukuba's comments as homophobic: "I completely disagree with and condemn this language. It is unacceptable. It dehumanises those human beings of whom the statement speaks." After Martyn Minns, an ACNA bishop who had been named a bishop in the Church of Nigeria in 2006, requested that the "Dear Gay Anglicans" letter be withdrawn, it was quickly taken down from the website on which it had originally been posted.

==== The Augustine Appeal ====
Later, in January 2024, controversy over women's ordination resurfaced when Calvin Robinson, a right-wing UK priest, was removed from "Mere Anglicanism" — a theological conference sponsored by the Anglican Diocese of South Carolina, an ACNA diocese that ordains women — after Robinson delivered remarks denouncing the ordination of women as a "Trojan horse" for critical theory. Afterward, South Carolina Bishop Chip Edgar issued a pastoral letter describing Robinson's remarks as "inexcusably provocative, and completely lacking in charity and pastoral consideration of the people in attendance — especially the many women clergy both of our diocese and others who attended". Other ACNA clergy — including several graduates of Nashotah House, a theologically conservative Anglo-Catholic seminary — publicly expressed concern that the organizers' removal of Robinson exhibited, in their view, a silencing of the truth. Several months later, nearly 300 clergy representing 27 of the 29 dioceses in the ACNA signed an open letter, titled "The Augustine Appeal", opposing the ordination of women to the priesthod and urging the College of Bishops to find "a creative solution to restore orthodoxy" by instituting a male-only priesthood.

In June 2024, Ryan Reed, the current Bishop of Fort Worth, reiterated that his diocese remained in a state of impaired communion with other ACNA dioceses that ordained women to the priesthood, calling on the ACNA "to agree to a moratorium on the practice of the ordination of women in order to facilitate full communion." Additionally, an elected group representing the Diocese of Fort Worth authored a resolution calling for a moratorium: "(W)e call upon the college of bishops, under the leadership of the next archbishop of the Anglican Church in North America, to agree to a moratorium on the practice of the ordination of women in order to facilitate full communion throughout the province as we come to a common mind on this issue." However, ACNA officials argued that such a resolution would require a constitutional amendment to the ACNA's bylaws, necessitating a two-thirds vote of the ACNA's Provincial Assembly, which wouldn't be achievable, according to their data.

=== Steve Wood's primacy (2024–) ===
Steve Wood, whose diocese ordains women to the priesthood, was elected as the ACNA's third archbishop in June 2024 and formally invested in October. During his tenure, the small, conservative denomination was shaken by a string of crises involving alleged misconduct by clergy, bishops, and ultimately Wood himself.

==== FBI investigation and DOMA ====
In January 2025, The Washington Post reported that the FBI was investigating a youth minister formerly employed at The Falls Church Episcopal, after Bishop Chris Warner of the Diocese of the Mid-Atlantic (DOMA) announced that an independent investigation concluded the minister had sexually abused students during the 1990s and early 2000s. Repeated institutional failures allowed the minister to move between parishes, including to another ACNA church. Warner took the unusual step of announcing that he had issued “Godly Admonitions” to current and former rectors of The Falls Church Anglican, one of the largest congregations in the ACNA, for failing to adequately respond to the allegations when first informed. In August, DOMA's Standing Committee responded to allegations of misconduct at Incarnation Anglican Church in Williamsburg, Virginia, emphasizing that it had "never sought to place a female rector in any congregation against its will" and that the ACNA's Provincial office had assured there would be no disciplinary action or provincial investigation into the allegations.

==== Licensing of Calvin Robinson ====
In May 2025, Bishop Ray Sutton granted a one-year ministry license to Calvin Robinson, a right-wing priest previously removed from an ACNA conference at which he denounced women’s ordination. Wood publicly opposed the licensure, questioning Robinson’s fitness to represent the ACNA. Sutton withdrew the license the following day.

==== Trial of Stewart Ruch ====
In July 2025, an ecclesiastical trial commenced against Bishop Stewart Ruch for allegedly mishandling sexual abuse disclosures and promoting abusive ministers. The case followed the conviction of a diocesan catechist for child sexual assault and grooming, allegations that Ruch delayed investigation for nearly two years, and an internal power struggle when Archbishop Foley Beach accused the ACNA's Provincial Tribunal (led by Bishop Julian Dobbs) of improperly attempting to halt the investigation via secret appeal by Ruch and a disputed stay order. The chaotic trial was repeatedly disrupted after the provincial prosecutor resigned, alleging judicial misconduct and claiming that ACNA leadership had improperly shared inadmissible evidence with the court. The college of bishops and executive committee of the ACNA responded by releasing statements defending the archbishop and his staff while denying misconduct. Successive resignations followed and proceedings were delayed multiple times.

Later, in December, the ACNA court acquitted Ruch on all charges of mishandling sexual abuse. In a 71-page ruling, the court commended Ruch for his "shepherd's heart" and portrayed him as a victim of “narrative capture” by blaming the entire controversy on social media. The court attacked the former prosecutor, calling his resignation and allegations of judicial misconduct "intolerable", and introduced a new evidentiary standard requiring up to ten eyewitnesses with "firsthand knowledge" for future allegations of misconduct in the small, conservative denomination.

==== Schism with the JAFC ====
In September 2025, the Jurisdiction of the Armed Forces and Chaplaincy (JAFC), a nonprofit overseeing chaplain endorsements in the ACNA, moved to formally disaffiliate from the ACNA. In the lead up to the crisis, ACNA leaders cited multiple complaints alleging abuse of ecclesiastical power by the JAFC's bishop, Derek Jones. Jones and his supporters withdrew from the ACNA, denied the allegations, accused Wood of pushing a progressive agenda, and situated the dispute as part of a conflict over women’s ordination. His supporters described Wood's process as "extra-canonical", accusing the ACNA's leadership of ignoring complaints about "dioceses drifting into heterodoxy", ordaining clergy who "openly reject biblical teaching" on abortion and homosexuality, and forcing the JAFC to receive them. After Wood inhibited Jones, the JAFC severed ties and sued the ACNA in federal court, alleging unfair business practices including misrepresentation, false advertising, misappropriation, tortious interference, trademark infringement, and defamation.

Later, in November, federal courts issued multiple restraining orders against the ACNA in its litigation with the JAFC, which amended its legal filing against the ACNA to include new charges of conspiracy, theft of proprietary information, and theft of personnel records (a federal crime) in December, causing the lawsuit to exceed $10 million. The same month, the JAFC launched a new denomination, the Anglican Reformed Catholic Church, "to provide a stable ecclesiastical home for those who love Anglican tradition but seek clear accountability."

In January 2026, the ACNA's leadership announced the appointment of a provincial prosecutor for the ecclesiastical trial against Jones, indicating that the Court was considering trying Jones concurrently with Wood (inhibited in November over allegations of sexual harassment, bullying, and plagiarism). Meanwhile, the JAFC issued a press release enumerating its reasons for voting to disaffiliate from the ACNA. In the statement, an official from the JAFC's executive committee wrote that "attempted irregular proceedings against Bishop Jones were not the cause, but the catalyst - the final confirmation that the JAFC's growing concerns were justified", citing perceived failures of doctrinal enforcement following the "Dear Gay Anglicans" letter in 2021 and alleged imposition of women's ordination at Incarnation Anglican Church in Williamsburg, Virginia in 2025. The day after the press release was published, according to an announcement from the ACNA, the ACNA's acting primate, Bishop Julian Dobbs, formally inhibited three JAFC bishops — Mike Williams, Marshall MacClellan, and Mark Nordstrom — from active ministry.

==== Inhibition of Steve Wood ====
On October 23, 2025, The Washington Post reported that Wood was the subject of a formal ecclesiastical presentment alleging sexual harassment, abuse of power, and plagiarism. A former children’s ministry director accused Wood of forcibly touching her and attempting to kiss her in his office in April 2024 and paying her thousands of dollars in church funds before the alleged incident. Wood claimed the allegations were without merit and went on paid leave with Bishop Ray Sutton assuming his duties as archbishop. Before going on leave, Wood appointed Bishop Julian Dobbs to assist Sutton as Dean of Provincial Affairs.

Multiple ACNA bishops issued statements defending the ACNA which were later perceived by others as misleading or defamatory. Bishop Chris Warner of the Diocese of the Mid-Atlantic issued a statement characterizing the complainants' decision to share the allegations with the Post as "disheartening". Bishop Chip Edgar of the Anglican Diocese of South Carolina pushed back on such assertions, calling for “a unified, public apology for these disparaging statements.” In November, the Post reported that Warner and Edgar were among four bishops initially approached about the allegations in May. When contacted, Warner had declined to endorse or review the presentment despite being informed that it included a sexual harassment charge involving a “potential unwanted advance.” At the time, Warner advised one complainant to submit the allegation through a reporting channel overseen by Wood’s staff because “there are women in that process,” and urged the complainants to wait a year before filing with the ACNA. On November 16, Warner emailed an apology to women in his diocese, acknowledging that "women's experiences are too often overlooked or minimized, particularly in systems led by men" and stating that he recently called for Wood’s inhibition.

By November, the presentment was amended to include a second woman's allegation of sexual harassment, along with an affidavit from the ACNA's former communications director, who alleged that Wood had become preoccupied with potential misconduct accusations shortly after his election and had discussed with Bishop Ray Sutton the possibility of a bishop-friendly board of inquiry should a presentment arise. Sutton initially denied the allegation but later issued a retraction. On November 15, Sutton appointed a board of inquiry but resigned the following day, naming Bishop Julian Dobbs as Dean of the Province and acting archbishop. Dobbs inhibited Wood on November 16, 2025. On December 14, the board of inquiry announced it had found probable cause to proceed to trial, indicting Wood on charges including violation of ordination vows, conduct causing scandal, and sexual immorality.

In January 2026, the ACNA's leadership announced the appointment of a provincial prosecutor for the ecclesiastical trial against Wood and indicated that the Court was considering trying him concurrently with JAFC Bishop Derek Jones. The ACNA also announced that it had voted to convene a Provincial Assembly to fast-track Title IV disciplinary reform and retained attorney and abuse advocate Rachael Denhollander to provide feedback about trauma-informed best practices. The same month, the ACNA's Director of Safeguarding and Canonical Affairs told Religion News Service that she would be stepping down from her role in February. In April, the Court announced that Wood had filed a motion to dismiss the case and that Wood's trial would begin on July 20.

==== Allegations against Julian Dobbs ====
On December 30, 2025, The Washington Post reported that the new acting archbishop of the ACNA, Julian Dobbs, faced allegations of financial misconduct totaling $76,000, involving $48,000 in missing JAFC funds and $28,000 in expense abuses during his tenure at the Barnabas Fund, a UK-based charity under active police investigation. Dobbs denied wrongdoing, asserting the allegations had been investigated and dismissed.

Dobbs subsequently filed a lawsuit against the JAFC's bishop, Derek Jones, for defamation in the United States District Court for the Northern District of Alabama in February 2026. Dobbs' attorneys alleged that Jones made defamatory remarks accusing Dobbs of stealing $48,000 from the JAFC during a September Zoom call, an October court filing, and a December interview with The Washington Post. Seeking punitive damages, the lawsuit alleged that Jones "made these false assertions repeatedly in the public record … in an all-out campaign to make the community, especially the Anglican faithful in North America and abroad, view Bishop Dobbs and other leaders within the ACNA (and, of course, by extension the ACNA) with disdain and disassociate from them".

==== "Safe Church" controversy ====
In February 2026, controversy broke out after the ACNA publicized a seminar on preventing sexism and abuse whose lineup would have included two bishops, Alex Farmer of the Gulf Atlantic Diocese and Alex Cameron of the Anglican Diocese of Pittsburgh. Backlash occurred over perceived feminism and over the seminar's use of the book Safe Church: How to Guard Against Sexism and Abuse in Christian Communities by non-Anglican therapist Andrew Bauman. New York Rev. Matt Kennedy criticized the book's advocacy for replacing male names in the Bible with female names. Anne Kennedy, his wife, also voiced her disapproval of the book.

Other members of the denomination vocally opposed what they perceived as an implicit provincial disapproval of those who do not support the ordination of women. A layman associated with North American Anglicans for Reform organized a petition against the book's use, claiming that the book described "traditional complementarian views on male-only priesthood as ‘misogyny cloaked as theological truth,’ ‘cult-like Kool-Aid,’ and inherently abusive patriarchal structures." The event was eventually cancelled by interim archbishop Julian Dobbs, who explained that he had decided to cancel the event "in consultation with the two bishops who were a part of it" and emphasized the need for "resources that reflect our orthodox theology". The book's author responded by saying that dismantling patriarchy and misogyny had ruffled some feathers.

== Beliefs ==
In its Fundamental Declarations, the Anglican Church in North America declares itself part of the One, Holy, Catholic, and Apostolic Church, confessing Jesus Christ to be the only way to God the Father. Consistent with this, it identifies the following seven elements as characteristic of the "Anglican Way" and essential for membership:

- The Bible is the inspired word of God, containing all things necessary for salvation, and is the final authority and unchangeable standard for Christian faith and life.
- Baptism and the Lord's Supper are sacraments ordained by Christ and are to be ministered with unfailing use of his words of institution and the elements ordained by him.
- The historic episcopate is an inherent part of the apostolic faith and practice, and therefore integral to the fullness and unity of the Body of Christ.
- The church affirms the historic faith of the undivided church as declared in the three ecumenical (catholic) creeds: the Apostles', the Nicene, and the Athanasian.
- Concerning the seven Councils of the undivided church, it affirms the teaching of the first four Ecumenical Councils and the Christological clarifications of the fifth, sixth and seventh councils, in so far as they are agreeable to the Bible.
- The 1662 Book of Common Prayer and its ordinal is a standard for Anglican doctrine and discipline and, with the editions before it, the standard for the Anglican tradition of worship.
- "[T]he Thirty-Nine Articles of Religion of 1571, taken in their literal and grammatical sense, [express] the Anglican response to certain doctrinal issues controverted at that time, and [express] fundamental principles of authentic Anglican belief."

In addition to the 1662 edition of the Book of Common Prayer, the ACNA has authorized the use of later versions, including the 1928 and 1979 versions produced by the Episcopal Church and the 1962 version produced by the Anglican Church of Canada. In 2013, the College of Bishops approved on a trial basis Texts for Common Prayer, a collection of liturgies made specifically for the Anglican Church in North America. Texts for Common Prayer includes morning prayer, evening prayer, the Eucharist or Lord's Supper, and an ordinal. In 2014, the ACNA also released a catechism for trial use, To Be a Christian: An Anglican Catechism, the Approved Edition of which was published in 2020. The new Book of Common Prayer of ACNA was released in 2019. The Calendar of Saints of ACNA was issued in 2017.

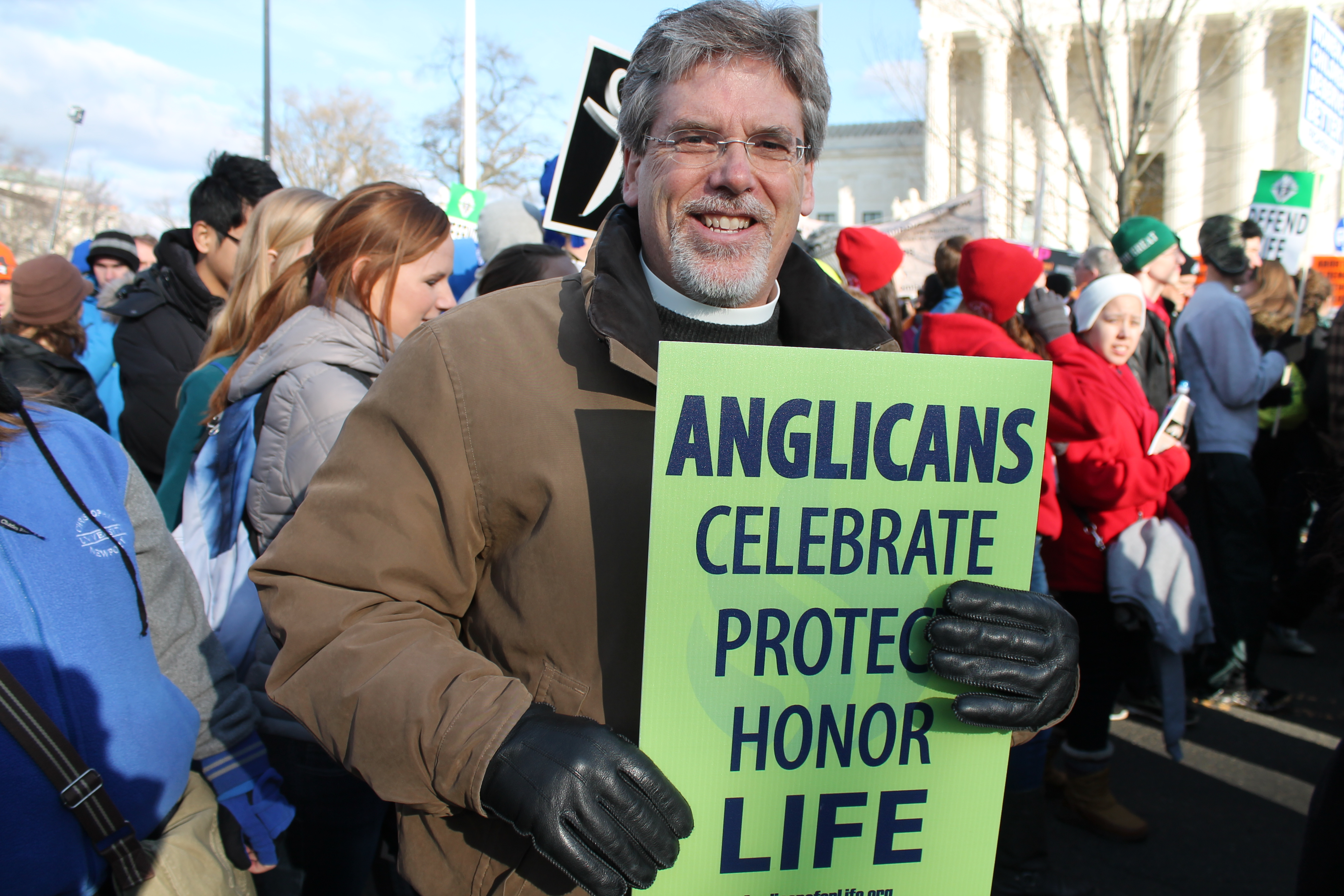
An Anglican clergyman marches with Anglicans for Life at the 2015 March for Life in Washington, D.C.

The ACNA has Anglo-Catholic, evangelical, and charismatic members and is more theologically conservative than the Episcopal Church and the Anglican Church of Canada. The church allows dioceses to decide if they will or will not ordain women as priests, although it does not permit women to become bishops. The College of Bishops released a statement on ordination, sharing that the teaching of the ACNA is that the ordination of women to the priesthood "is a recent innovation to Apostolic Tradition and Catholic Order. We agree that there is insufficient scriptural warrant to accept women's ordination to the priesthood as standard practice throughout the Province...[but] that individual dioceses have constitutional authority to ordain women to the priesthood."

Concerning marriage, it holds that it is between one man and one woman; therefore, it opposes same sex unions. The ACNA opposes abortion and euthanasia, proclaiming "all members and clergy are called to promote and respect the sanctity of every human life from conception to natural death". The ACNA is associated with Anglicans for Life for promotion of the pro-life ministry. In Canada, the ACNA opposes "medical aid in dying" (MAID) and restricts its clergy from being present at the administration of MAID to avoid the appearance of complicity. In 2018, ACNA Archbishop Foley Beach signed a letter with several other church leaders stating gender cannot be separated from one's sex as male or female.

The Canons and Constitution of the ACNA lay out the Church's beliefs regarding the duties of the laity, or non-clergy members of the church. Included among these duties are an obligation for the laity to "worship God...every Lord's Day in a church unless reasonably prevented," a duty similar to the Roman Catholic Holy Day of Obligation, as well as duties to "receive worthily the Sacrament of Holy Communion as often as reasonable" and to "observe the feasts and fasts of the Church set forth in the Anglican formularies."

== Structure ==
Provincial flag

The Anglican Church in North America is structured as a self-governing, multinational ecclesiastical province. The province's polity is described in its constitution and canon law. The basic level of organization is the local congregation. Each congregation is part of a diocese led by a bishop. Dioceses are self-governing bodies that operate according to their own diocesan canon law (as long as this is consistent with the provincial constitution), and they are able to leave the province at any time if they so choose. Because ACNA dioceses often represent affinity groups going back to the province's foundation, the ACNA's dioceses may overlap geographically. Because local churches and dioceses retain a significant degree of autonomy, the ACNA has relatively weak ecclesial authority with limited mechanisms for disciplining its constituent members.

The ACNA is a conciliar church in which both clergy and laity participate in church governance. Every five years, between 250 and 300 diocesan delegates meet as a representative body called the Provincial Assembly. Each diocese is represented by its bishop, two clergy delegates, and two lay delegates. In addition, a diocese receives one additional clergy delegate and one additional lay delegate for every 1,000 constituents, calculated by average attendance at Sunday church services. Dioceses also send youth representatives between the ages of 16 and 26, and these representatives have full voting rights. The Provincial Assembly must approve all constitutional amendments and new canons before they go into effect. Other duties of the assembly include deliberating on church affairs and making recommendations to the provincial governing bodies on such matters.

The ACNA's governing body is the Provincial Council. The council meets every June and is responsible for enacting policy, approving a budget, and recommending changes to the constitution and canons. Each diocese selects a bishop, a clergy member, and two lay persons to represent it on the council. The council itself may also appoint up to six other persons as members, bringing the total number to around 140 members. Council members serve five-year terms. The Provincial Council is led by an executive committee, which sets the council's agenda and serves as the church's board of directors. The executive committee's 12 members are divided equally between clergy and laity. In addition to meeting three times a year in person, they communicate regularly by conference call.

All bishops in active ministry are members of the College of Bishops. The college elects the archbishop, the presiding officer and primate of the church, who convenes the Provincial Assembly, the Provincial Council, and the College of Bishops. The college also has authority to approve diocesan elections of bishops, or in some cases actually elect bishops. There are 50 active bishops sitting in the college. The archbishop has a cabinet composed of leading bishops within the church which functions as a council of advice. The Provincial Tribunal is an ecclesiastical court empowered to rule on constitutional and canonical disputes.

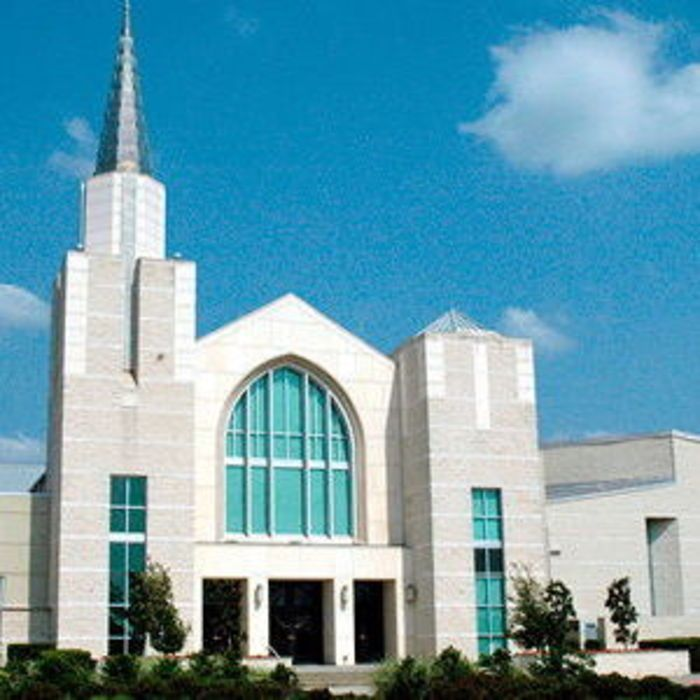
Christ Church Cathedral in Plano, Texas

Local congregations hold their own property and the province disavows any claim on the property of local congregations. Existing property-holding arrangements within the founding member entities are not affected by their relation to the province. The province also disavows any authority to control the member entities' policies regarding the question of the ordination of women as deacons or priests.

The constitution and canons specify that other non-member groups (such as a seminary, monastic order or ministry organization, or a diocese, congregation or other entity) may be considered for association as ministry partners or affiliated ministries. These affiliated groups may have representation in church gatherings as determined by the archbishop and may withdraw from affiliation or have their affiliation ended with or without cause. ACNA affiliated ministries include Anglican Global Mission Partners (a missionary organization), Anglican Relief and Development Fund, and Anglican 1000 (a church planting initiative).

In 2021, Foley Beach designated Christ Church Plano, one of the largest churches in the ACNA to serve as pro-cathedral for the province under Beach's personal oversight as archbishop. Christ Church hosted the investiture of Robert Duncan as the first archbishop and the ACNA province-wide assembly in 2019.

=== Dioceses and statistics ===
In 2025, the ACNA reported 1,004 total congregations, 129,997 members and an average Sunday attendance of 98,514. In 2017, the ACNA reported 1,037 congregations with a membership of 134,593 and an average Sunday attendance of 93,489. The 2017 average Sunday attendance was an increase from statistics reported in 2009, the year the church was founded when the church reported 703 congregations and an average Sunday attendance of 69,167.

In 2019, the Anglican Church in North America reported 972 congregations with a membership of 127,624 and an average Sunday attendance of 84,310 people. The primate of the ACNA, Archbishop Foley Beach, and church staff identified the departure of two dioceses from the Convocation of Anglicans in North America as the primary cause of the decline in membership and attendance: namely, the withdrawal of the Missionary Diocese of CANA West and the Anglican Diocese of the Trinity to be solely Church of Nigeria and Convocation of Anglicans in North America dioceses.

In 2020, the denominational statistics reported 972 congregations, no change from 2019, 126,760 members, and an average Sunday attendance of 83,119 people. In 2022, using statistics from 2021, the ACNA reported 974 congregations; 122,450 members; and an average Sunday attendance of 73,832 from its highest two months; average Sunday attendance overall was 58,255. 2022 data saw a slight increase in membership to 124,999 members and reported an increase in average Sunday attendance to 75,583.

In 2023, the province had recovered to pre-COVID levels of membership (128,114) and average Sunday attendance (84,794). The Missionary Diocese of CANA West rejoined ACNA in 2023 with the name of Anglican Diocese of All Nations.

ACNA congregations are now organized into the following 28 dioceses and jurisdictions:

1. Anglican Diocese of All Nations
2. Missionary Diocese of All Saints
3. Special Jurisdiction of the Armed Forces and Chaplaincy
4. Anglican Diocese of Canada
5. Diocese of the Carolinas
6. Diocese of Cascadia
7. REC Diocese of the Central States
8. Anglican Diocese of Christ Our Hope
9. Episcopal Diocese of Fort Worth
10. Anglican Diocese of the Great Lakes (Not to be confused with the older Diocese of the Great Lakes, an autonomous Continuing Anglican jurisdiction.)
11. Gulf Atlantic Diocese
12. Anglican Diocese of the Living Word
13. REC Diocese of Mid-America, with the Convocation of the West and Western Canada
14. Diocese of the Mid-Atlantic
15. Anglican Diocese in New England
16. REC Diocese of the Northeast and Mid-Atlantic, with the Convocation of Eastern Canada
17. Anglican Diocese of Pittsburgh
18. Anglican Diocese of the Rocky Mountains
19. Diocese of Quincy
20. Diocese of Churches for the Sake of Others
21. Diocese of San Joaquin
22. Anglican Diocese of the South
23. Anglican Diocese of South Carolina
24. REC Diocese of the Southeast
25. Anglican Diocese of the Southwest
26. Anglican Diocese of the Upper Midwest
27. Diocese of Western Anglicans
28. Anglican Diocese of the Western Gulf Coast
Gallery
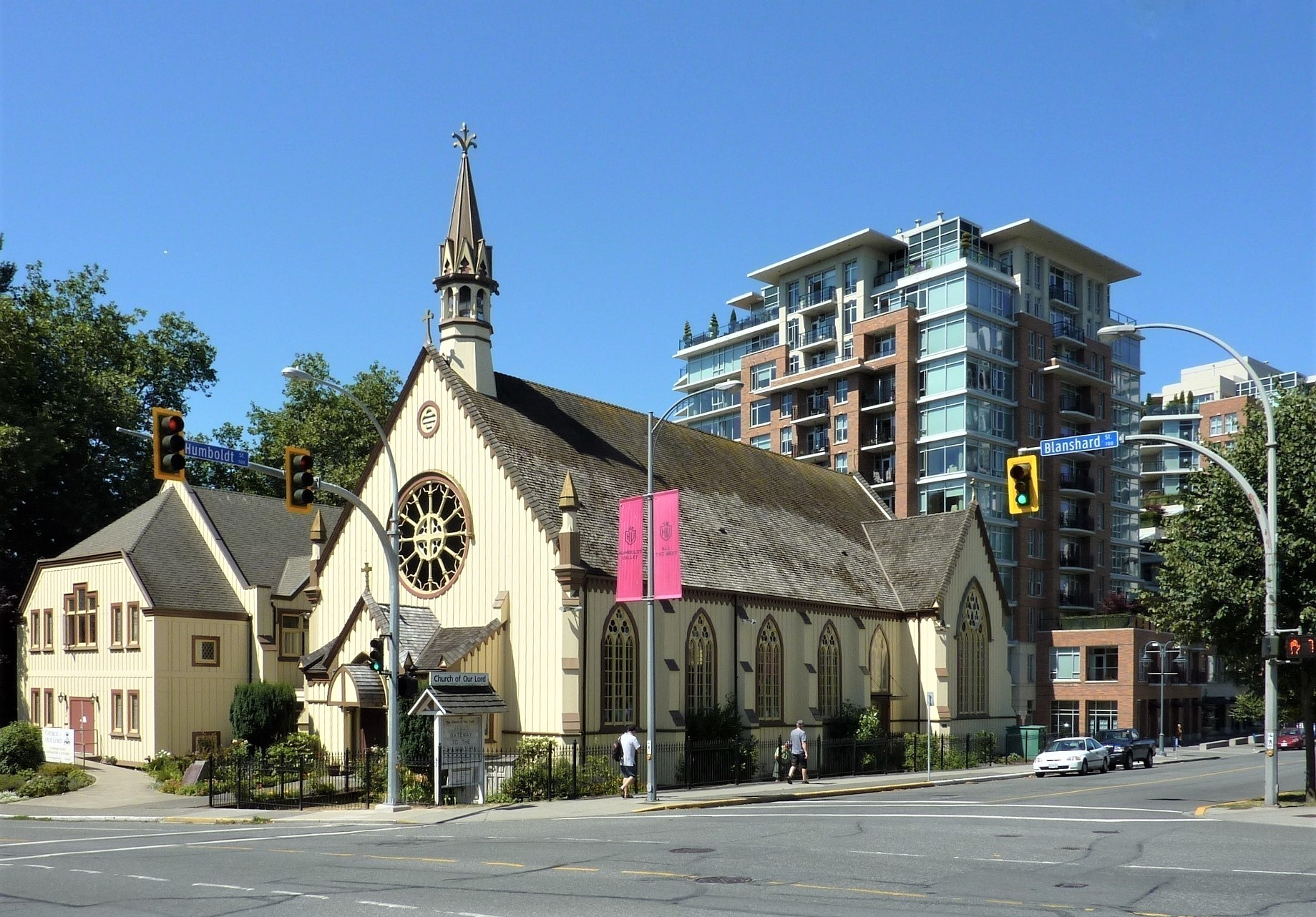
Church of Our Lord, Victoria, British Columbia (Anglican Diocese of Canada)

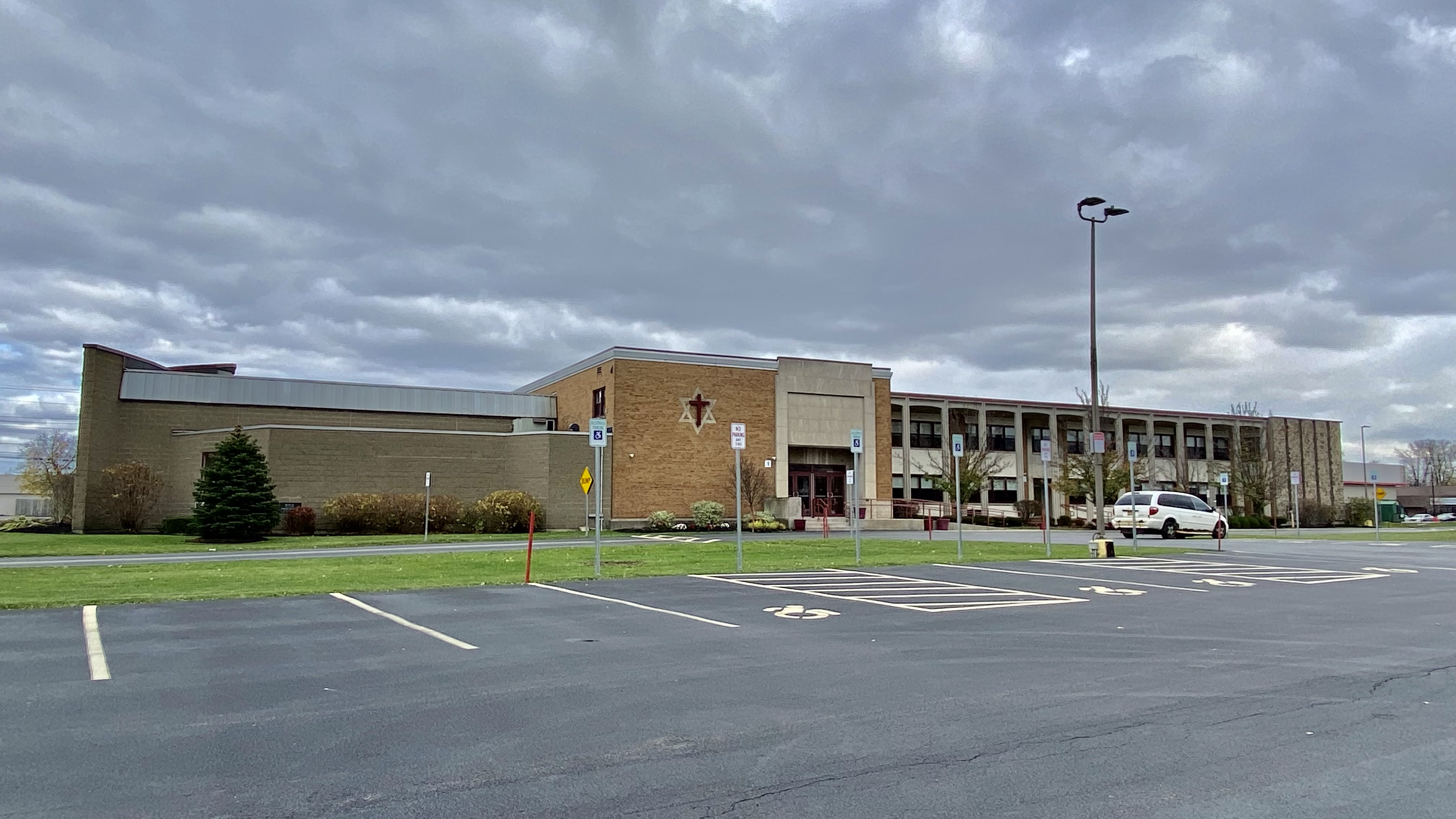
St. Bartholomew's Anglican Church, Tonawanda, New York (Diocese of Christ Our Hope)

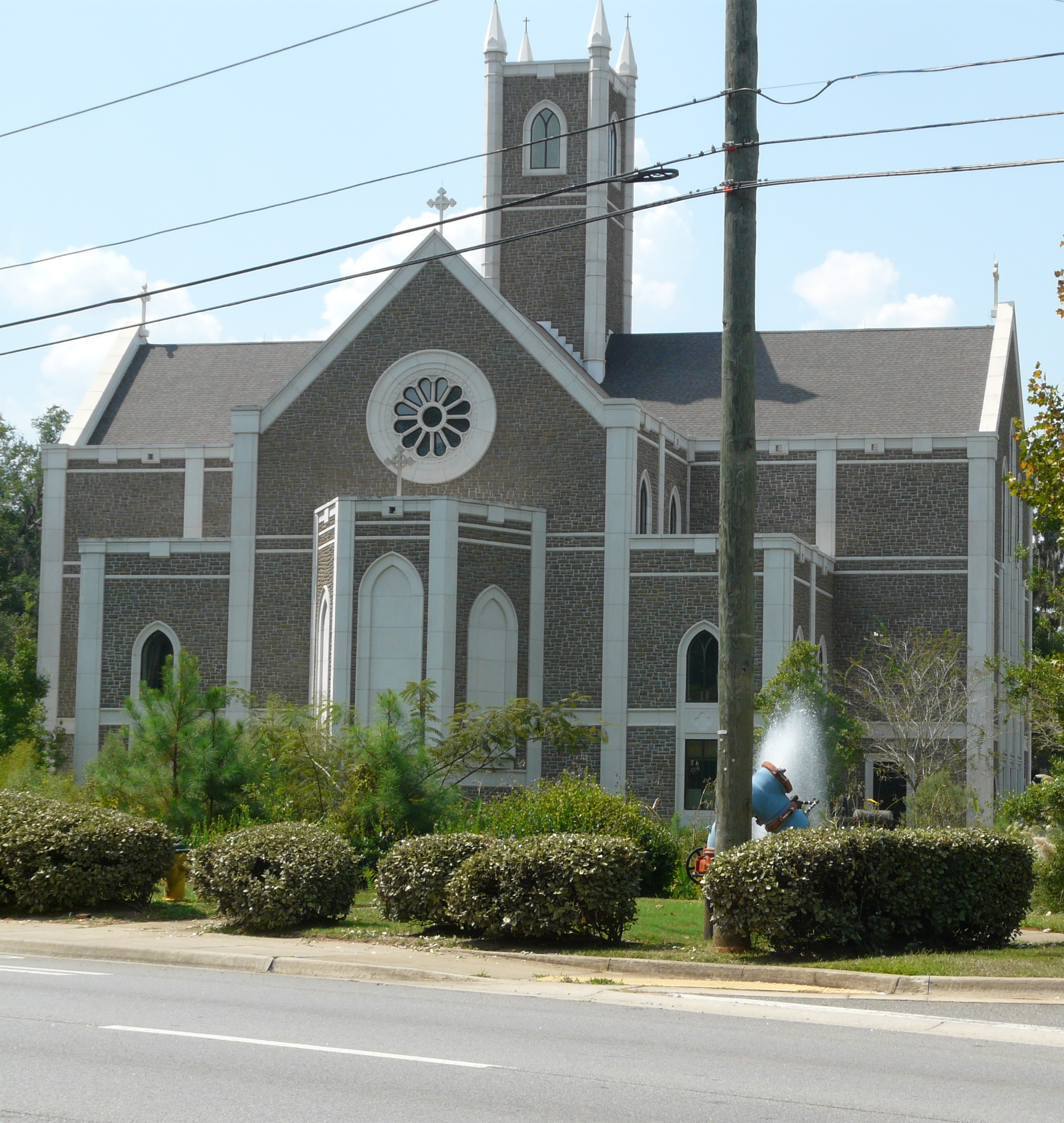
St. Peter's Cathedral, Tallahassee, Florida (Gulf Atlantic Diocese)

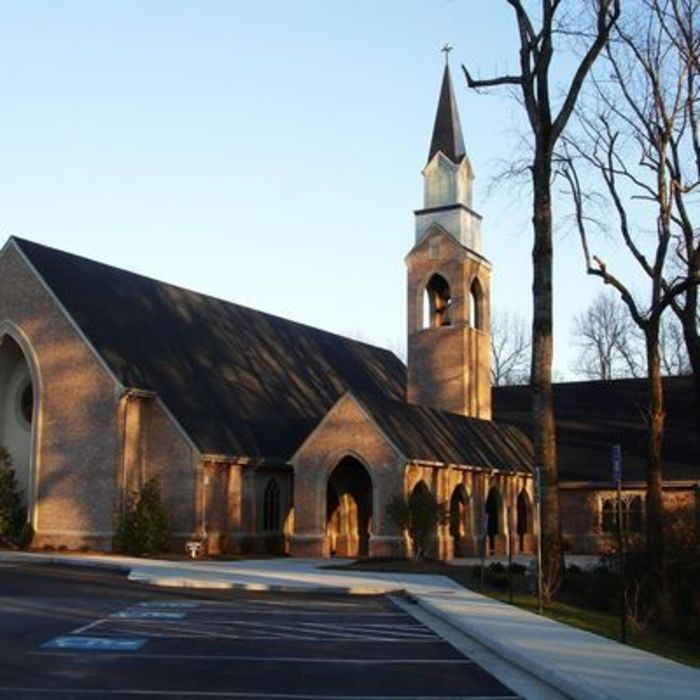
Holy Cross Cathedral, Loganville, Georgia (Diocese of the South)

St. John's Parish, Quincy, Illinois (Diocese of Quincy)

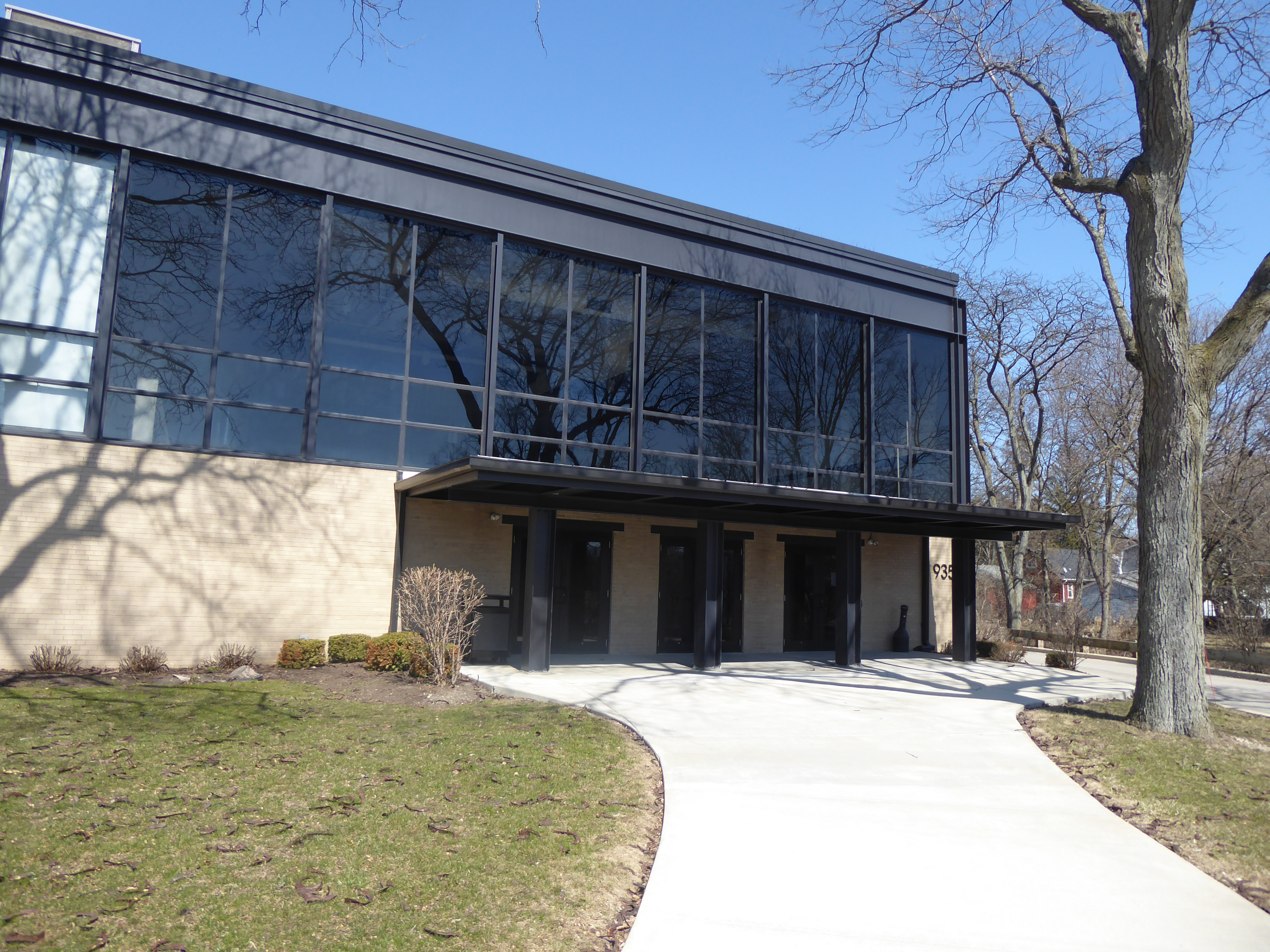
Church of the Resurrection, Wheaton, Illinois (Upper Midwest Diocese)

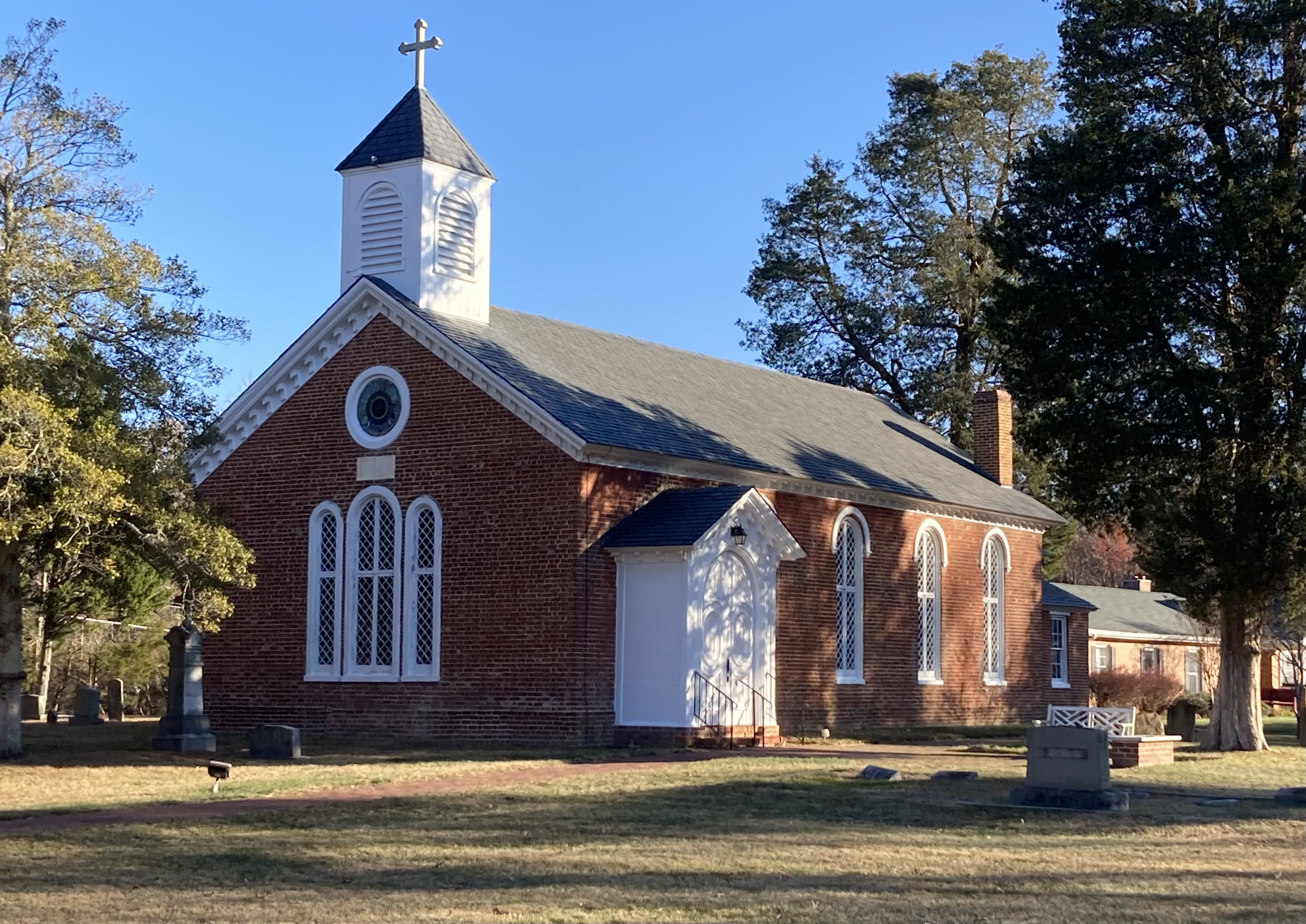
Christ Church, Accokeek, Maryland (Diocese of the Mid-Atlantic)

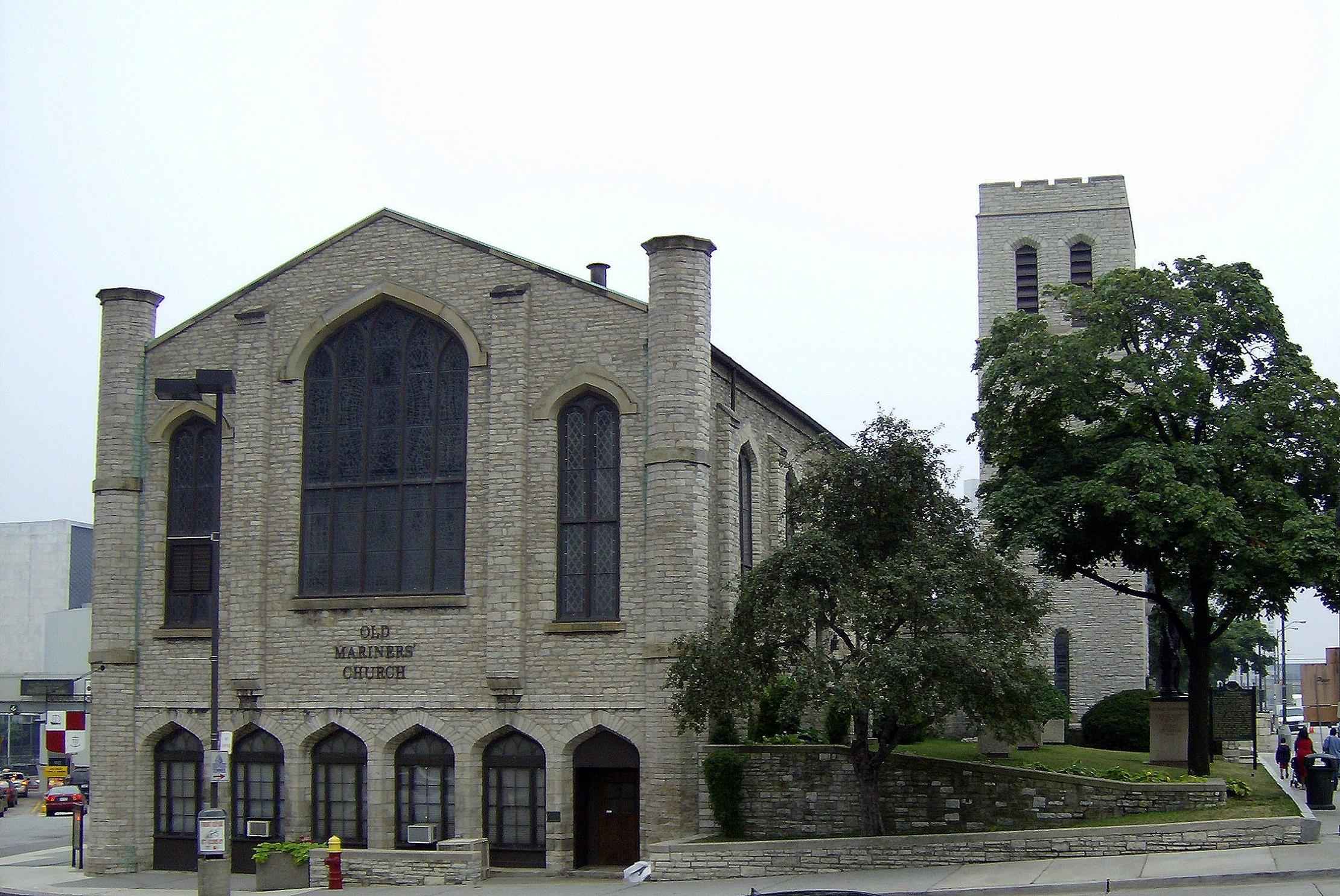
Mariners' Church, Detroit, Michigan (REC Diocese of Mid-America)

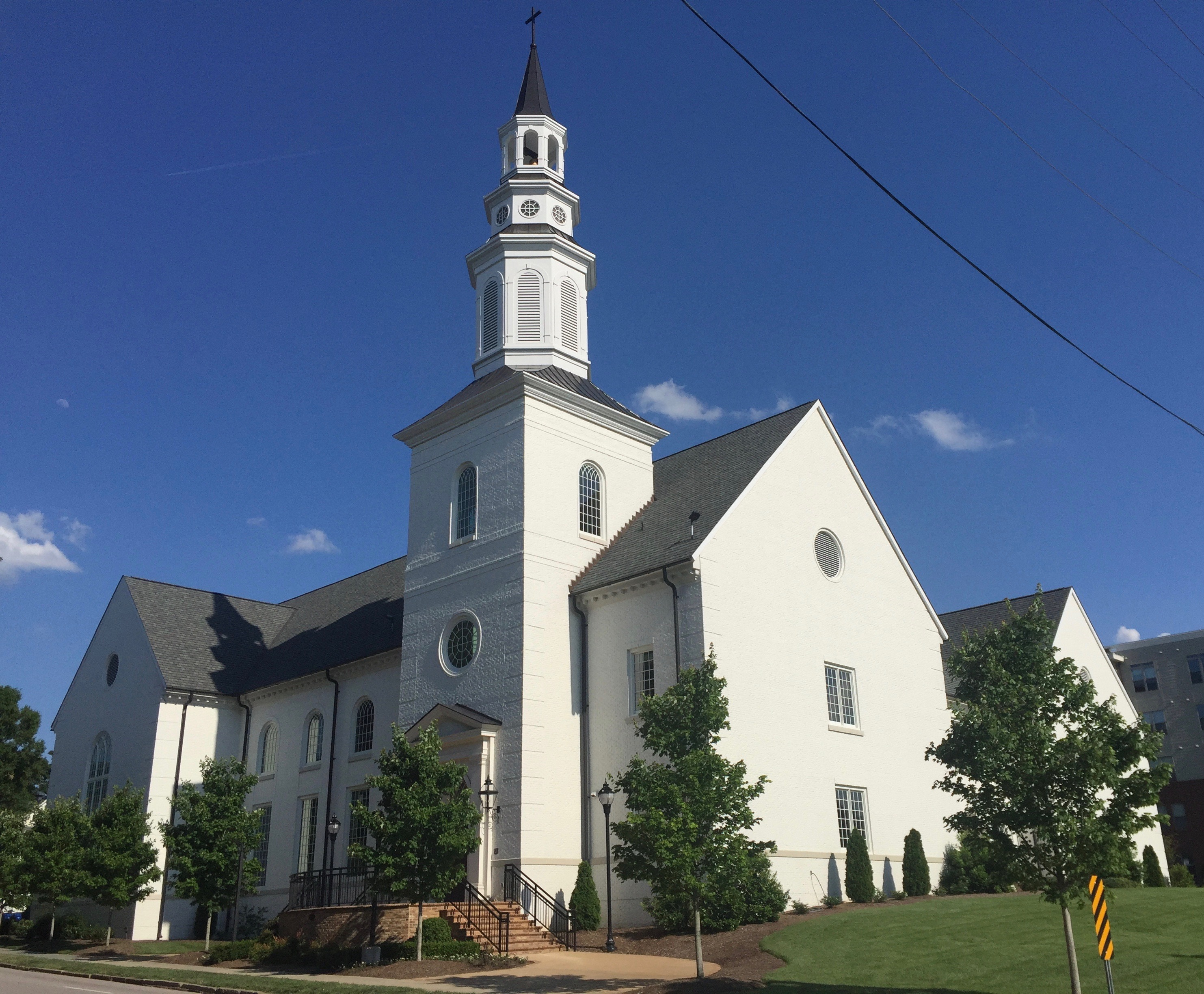
Holy Trinity Church, Raleigh, North Carolina (Diocese of the Carolinas)

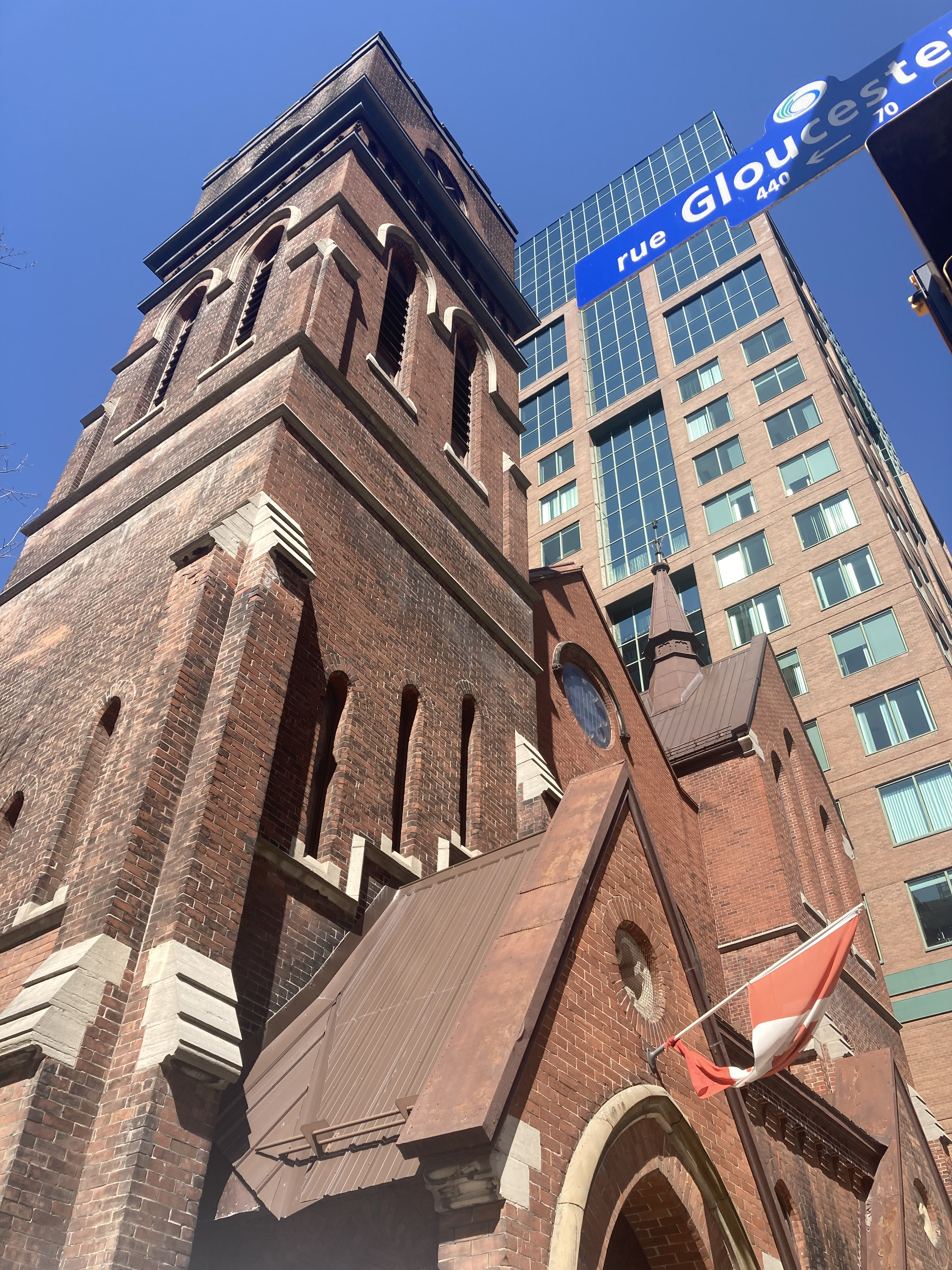
St. Peter and St. Paul Anglican Church, Ottawa, Ontario (Anglican Diocese of Canada)

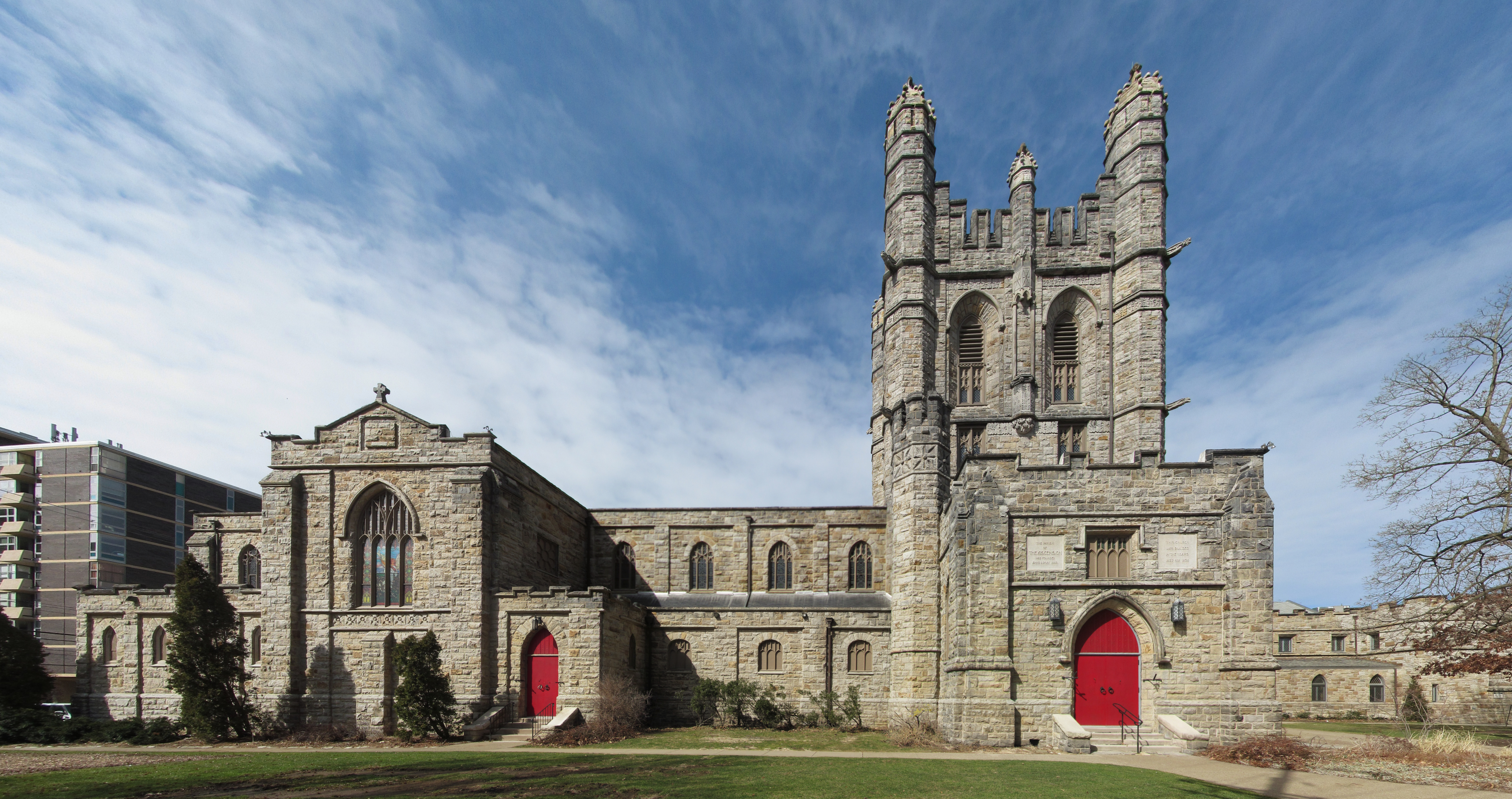
Church of the Ascension, Pittsburgh, Pennsylvania (Diocese of Pittsburgh)

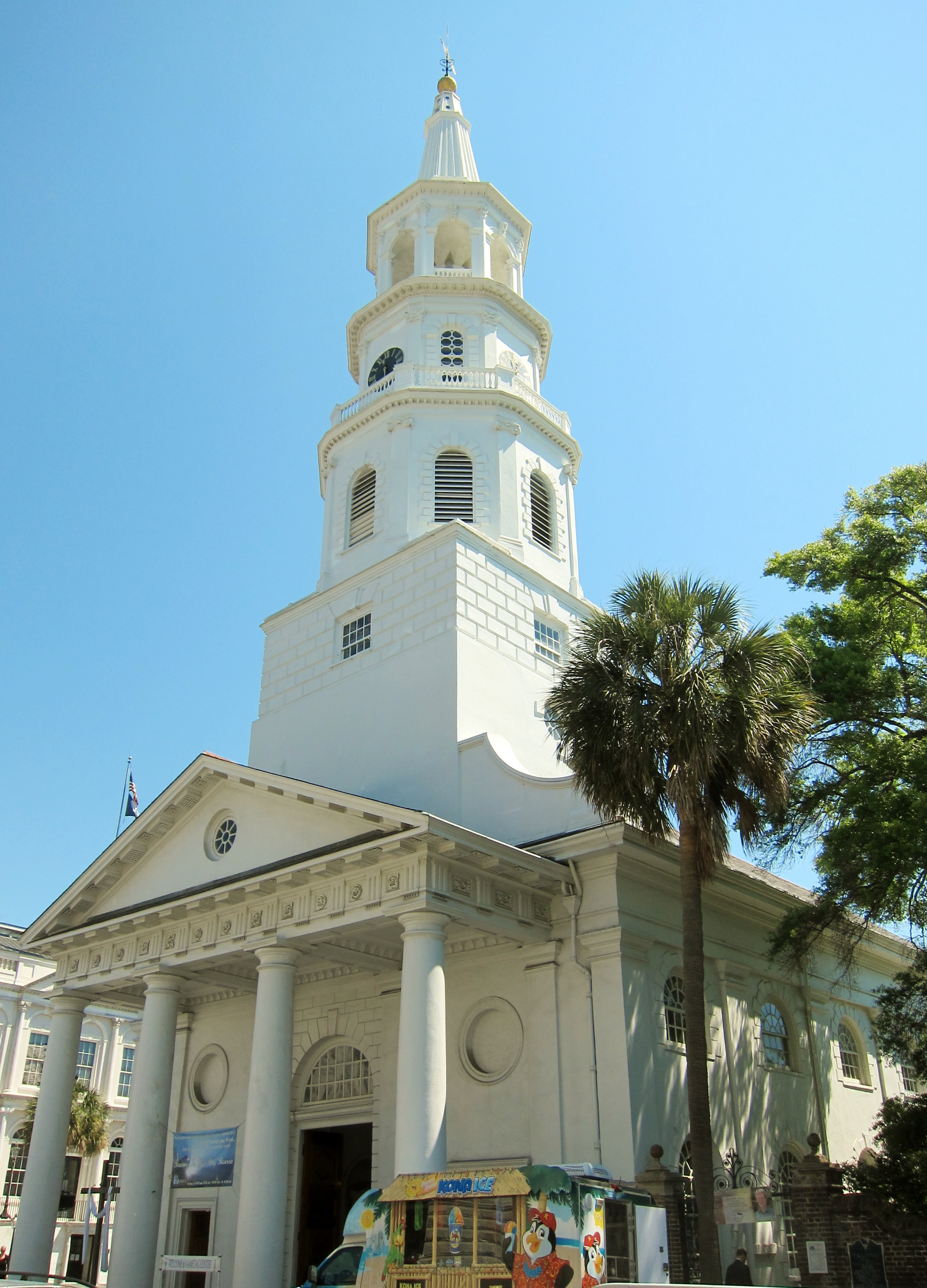
St. Michael's Church, Charleston, South Carolina (Diocese of South Carolina)

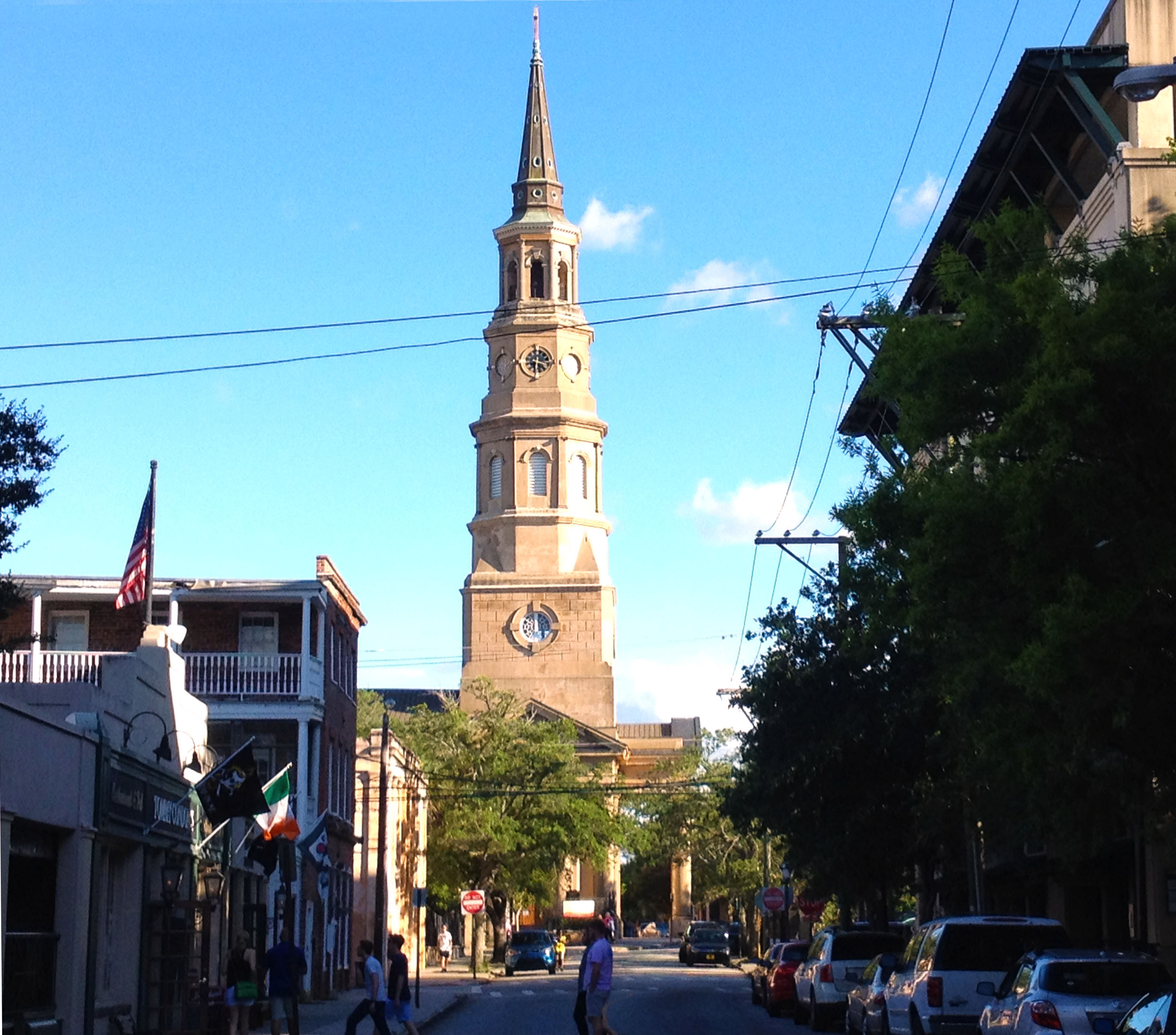
St. Philip's Church, Charleston, South Carolina (Diocese of South Carolina)

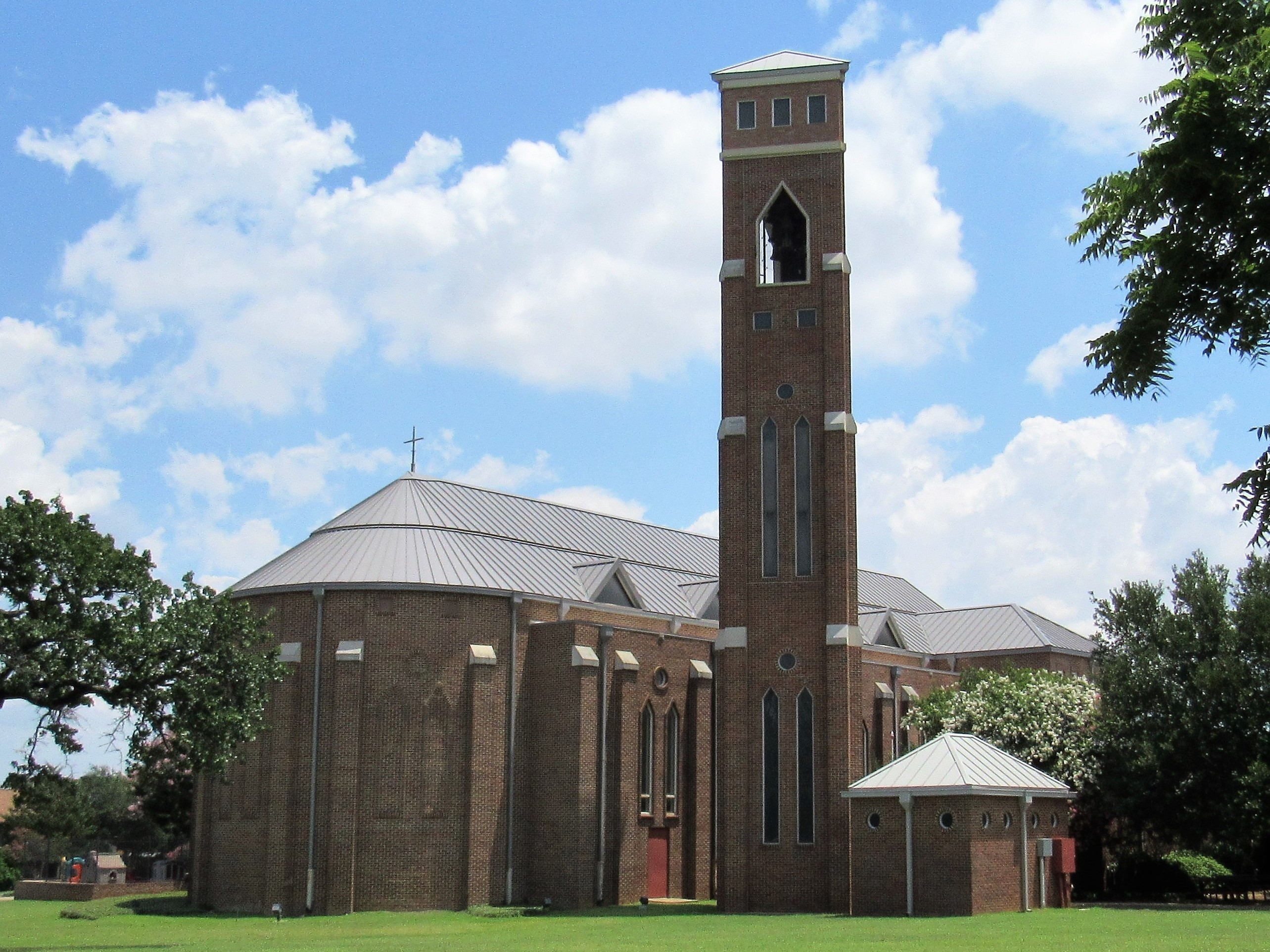
St. Vincent's Cathedral, Bedford, Texas (Diocese of Fort Worth)

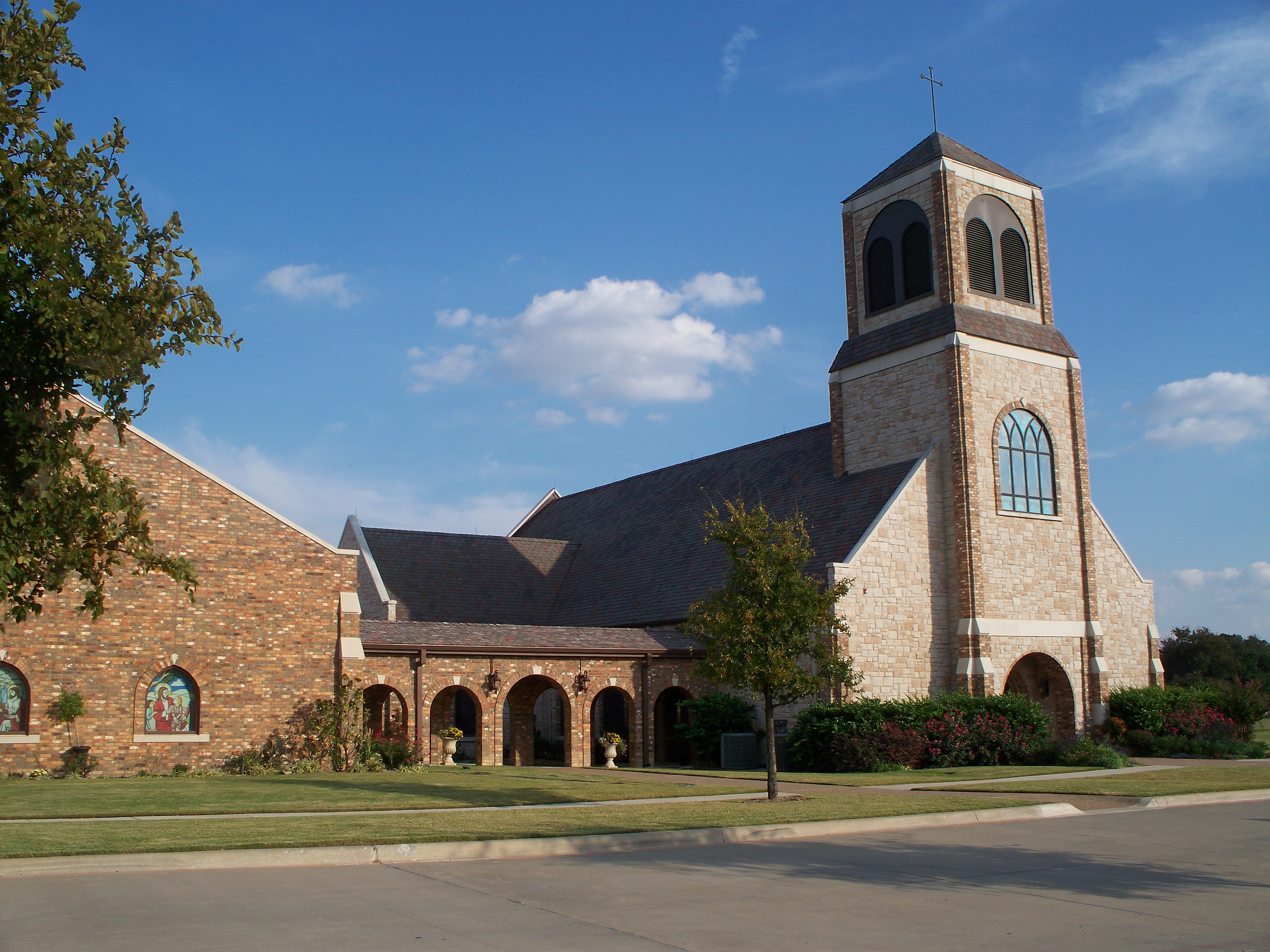
Cathedral Church of the Holy Communion, Dallas, Texas (REC Diocese of Mid-America)

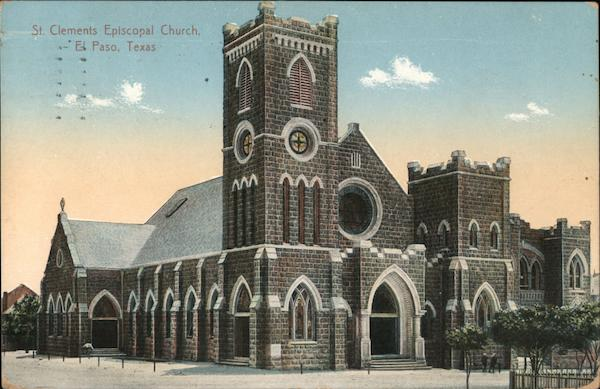
Church of St. Clement, El Paso, Texas (Diocese of the Southwest)

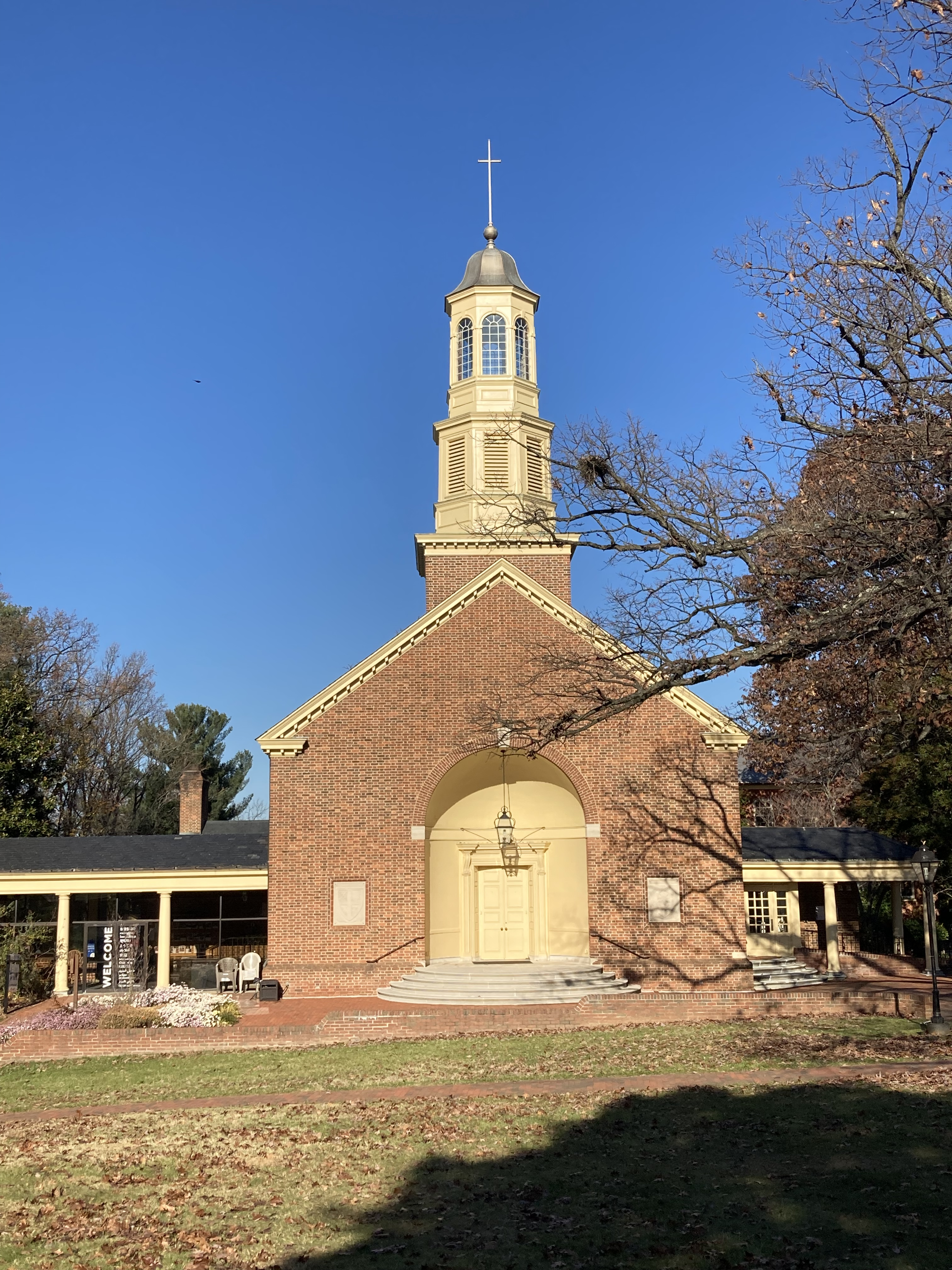
Truro Church, Fairfax, Virginia (Diocese of the Mid-Atlantic)

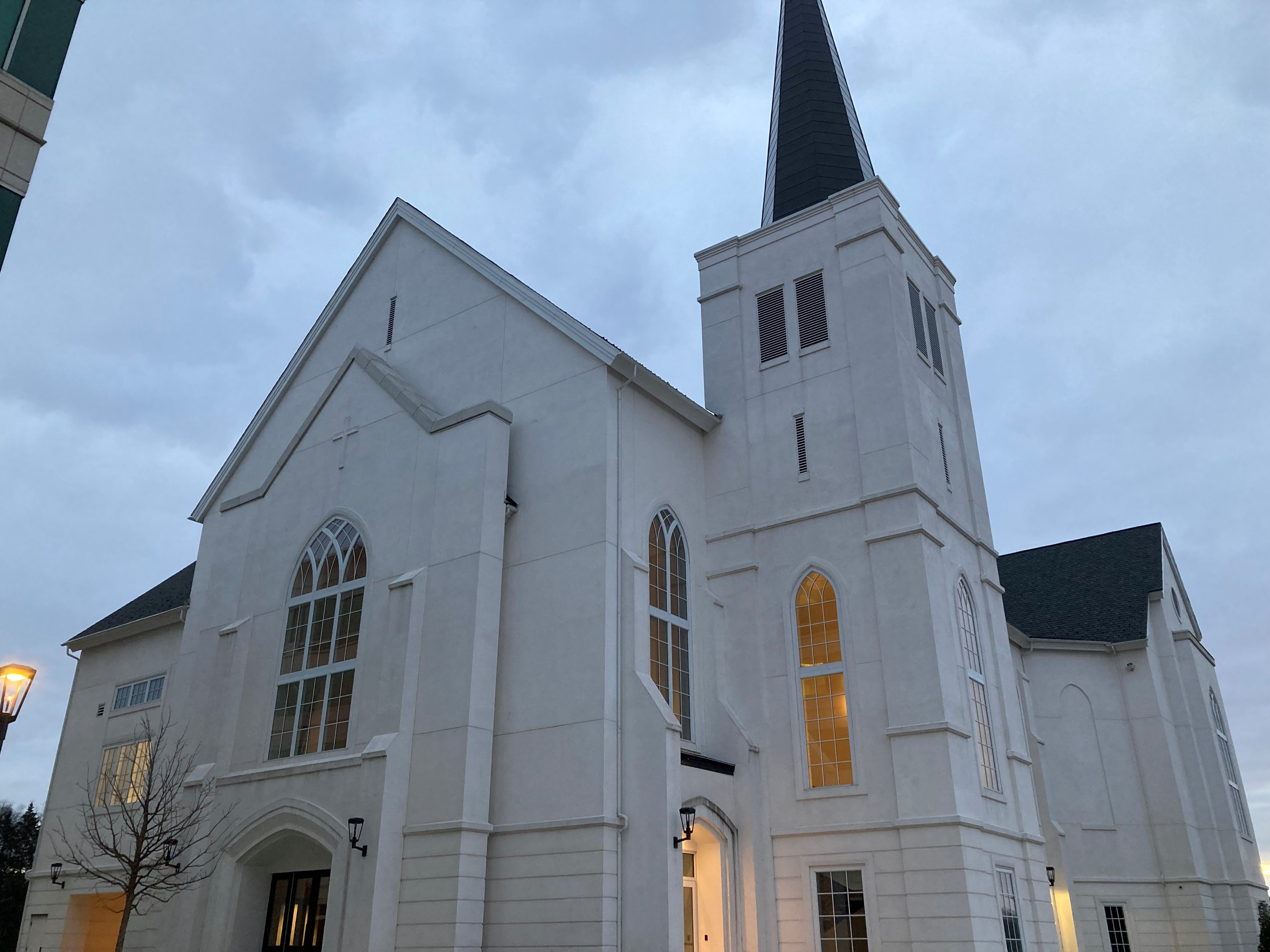
The Falls Church Anglican, West Falls Church, Virginia (Diocese of the Mid-Atlantic)

== Ecumenical relations ==
=== Anglican churches ===
The ACNA's constitution expresses the goal to seek recognition as a province of the Anglican Communion. A total of nine Anglican provinces sent formal delegations to the inaugural assembly. The Anglican Church in North America has not yet requested formal recognition by the Anglican Communion office as a province recognized by the Anglican instruments of communion. The office of the Archbishop of Canterbury has said it would possibly take years for the ACNA to gain official recognition from the rest of the Anglican Communion.

In several cases ACNA has become entangled in protracted legal disputes over church property (for example, when the ACNA's Diocese of Fort Worth split from the Episcopal Church), with some of these lawsuits continuing for years.

The Fellowship of Confessing Anglicans primates' council has said that the new church is "fully Anglican" and called for its recognition by existing provinces of the Anglican Communion. Archbishop Robert Duncan was present at the Global South Fourth Encounter that took place in Singapore, in April 2010, where he presided at the Eucharist and met primates and representatives from 20 Anglican provinces. The Global South Encounter final statement declared: "We are grateful that the recently formed Anglican Church in North America (ACNA) is a faithful expression of Anglicanism. We welcomed them as partners in the Gospel and our hope is that all provinces will be in full communion with the clergy and people of the ACNA and the Communion Partners."

In March 2009, the Anglican Church of Nigeria declared itself to be in full communion with the Anglican Church in North America, followed by the House of Bishops of the Anglican Church of Uganda in June 2009 and the Episcopal Church of Sudan in December 2011. Inasmuch as these churches report approximately 30,500,000 members, and the Anglican Communion reports over 80,000,000 members, the ACNA is in communion with churches comprising somewhat over one-third of the membership of the Anglican Communion.

On the final day of its 2009 synod, the Anglican Diocese of Sydney passed a resolution welcoming the creation of the ACNA and expressing a desire to be in full communion. The resolution also called for the diocese's standing committee to seek a general synod motion affirming the Anglican Church of Australia to be in full communion with the ACNA. The Anglican Diocese of Sydney declared itself to be in "full communion" with ACNA during its synod on October 13, 2015.

In 2010, the General Synod of the Church of England affirmed "the desire of those who have formed the Anglican Church in North America to remain within the Anglican family" and called upon the archbishops of Canterbury and York to report back to the synod after further study in 2011. Published in December 2011, the archbishops' follow up report recommended "an open-ended engagement with ACNA on the part of the Church of England and the Communion" but also stated that a definitive outcome would be unclear for sometime.

Archbishop Robert Duncan met following his invitation the Archbishop of Canterbury, Justin Welby, in May 2013, to discuss the recognition of the ACNA ordinations in the near future. Welby announced on January 16, 2014, that Tory Baucum, Rector of Truro Church in Fairfax, Virginia, a parish of the ACNA, had been elected unanimously to serve as one of the Six Preachers of Canterbury Cathedral. Baucum was installed on March 14, 2014, attended by both Justin Welby and Robert Duncan. In October 2014, Welby stated that Tory Baucum had been ordained before ACNA's inception and because of that his Anglican orders were valid, so he was eligible to be elected to that office. He further stated that ACNA was a separate church and not part of the Anglican Communion.

In October 2014, the Diocese of North West Australia passed a motion recognizing the ACNA as a "member church of the Anglican Communion". On October 9, 2014, following the ceremony of investiture of Foley Beach as archbishop and primate of ACNA, an official statement, which recognized Beach as "a fellow Primate of the Anglican Communion", was signed by the seven Anglican archbishops present: Mouneer Anis of Jerusalem and the Middle East, Eliud Wabukala of Kenya, Nicholas Okoh of Nigeria, Stanley Ntagali of Uganda, Onesphore Rwaje of Rwanda, Stephen Than Myint Oo of Myanmar, and Héctor "Tito" Zavala of the Southern Cone of America. However, the authority to decide whether ACNA should be admitted to the worldwide Anglican Communion lies with the Anglican Consultative Council, and not with individual member churches or provinces. Member churches and provinces are, however, able to develop bilateral relations, which do not bind the rest of the Anglican Communion.

At a meeting of the Anglican Primates of the Global South (a coalition representing the majority of the world's Anglicans) on October 14–16, 2015, in Cairo, Egypt, ACNA was declared to be an official partner province of the Global South by representatives of twelve churches, with Archbishop Beach being seated as a member of the Global South Primates Council with voice and vote.

Despite the ACNA not being recognized as a province of the Anglican Communion, Welby invited Beach to attend a gathering of primates in the communion as an observer in January 2016. While not permitted to vote, Beach was allowed to attend the first four days of the five-day session. The prospect of the ACNA joining the communion was discussed and it was recognized that if the ACNA were to apply for admission to membership in the communion, the consideration of their application would be within the purview of the Anglican Consultative Council.

The Archbishops of Canterbury and York, Justin Welby and John Sentamu, recognized ACNA's religious orders under the Overseas and Other Clergy (Ministry and Ordination) Measure 1967 (No. 3), as it was announced on 10 February 2017.

After a meeting between Archbishop Foley Beach of ACNA and the Moderator/Primate of the Church of Bangladesh, Paul Sarker, on May 13–15, 2017, at Holy Cross Anglican Cathedral in Loganville, Georgia, they signed a statement affirming and celebrating the communion between both provinces thereby causing ACNA to enter into full communion with the Church of Bangladesh.

In February 2016, Archbishop Foley Beach signed an instrument declaring ACNA to be in full communion with the Free Church of England, a reformed and Protestant Anglican church. Archbishop Beach's declaration was ratified by the Provincial Council of the ACNA in June 2016. The Reformed Episcopal Church, a founding member of the denomination, was already in that status with the FCE since 1927. Foley Beach and Ray Sutton, Presiding Bishop of REC, participated at the celebrations of the 90th anniversary of the communion between FCE and REC, which took place at Wallasey, England, on June 10, 2017.

Fulfilling what Archbishop Foley Beach had already announced on June 8, 2017, on the same day that the Scottish Episcopal Church voted to approve same-sex marriage, Andy Lines was consecrated Missionary Bishop to Europe at ACNA's Third Provincial Assembly meeting in Wheaton, Illinois, on June 30, 2017, on behalf of GAFCON. The consecration was attended by 1,400 Anglican representatives from all over the world, including 11 primates, 3 archbishops, and 13 bishops. The Primates who attended were Nicholas Okoh, from the Church of Nigeria, Stanley Ntagali, from the Church of Uganda, Daniel Deng Bul, from the Province of the Episcopal Church of South Sudan and Sudan, Jacob Chimeledya, from the Anglican Church of Tanzania, Jackson Ole Sapit, from the Anglican Church of Kenya, Onesphore Rwaje, from the Province of the Anglican Church of Rwanda, Zacharie Masimango Katanda, from the Province of the Anglican Church of the Congo, Daniel Sarfo, from the Church of the Province of West Africa, Gregory Venables, from the Anglican Church of South America, Ng Moon Hing, from the Church of the Province of South East Asia, and Mouneer Anis, retired Presiding Bishop of the Episcopal Church in Jerusalem and the Middle East. This was the largest gathering of worldwide Anglicans that ever participated at a Provincial Assembly of the ACNA.

On December 13, 2017, the Anglican Global South, a grouping of Southern Hemisphere provinces of the Anglican Communion, reaffirmed full communion with the Anglican Church in North America.

The ACNA was represented at GAFCON III, held in Jerusalem, from June 17–22, 2018, by a large delegation from the United States and Canada. At the final of the conference, it was announced that Archbishop Foley Beach will take office as Chairman of the GAFCON's Primates Council in early 2019. After the end of GAFCON III, ACNA held the meeting of their Provincial Council in Jerusalem, for the first time outside North America.

The ACNA endorsed a concordat with the Episcopal Missionary Church, a Continuing Anglican denomination, in January 2020, which was signed by Archbishop Foley Beach and EMC Presiding Bishop William Millsaps on 14 September 2020.

In 2021, the ACNA College of Bishops released a pastoral statement rejecting the use of the phrase "gay Christian", instead recommending the phrase "same-sex attraction", and that restated the church's belief that sex is reserved for marriage between one man and one woman while acknowledging that celibate "same-sex attracted" people can be members of the denomination. This statement divided the ACNA as well as GAFCON, the body of Anglican churches with which the ACNA is affiliated. Within the ACNA, Bishop Todd Hunter of the Diocese of Churches for the Sake of Others (C4SO) released his own pastoral statement in which he used both phrases "gay Christian" and "same-sex attracted", criticizing and departing from the College of Bishops' guidance, and in which he affirmed the membership of those who identify as "gay Christian" pursuing celibacy or "mixed orientation" marriages. Conversely, Archbishop Henry Ndukuba, the Primate of the Church of Nigeria, criticized and rejected the ACNA College of Bishops' pastoral guidance as being too open to homosexuality; Archbishop Ndukuba referred to homosexuality as a "deadly virus" and called on the ACNA to join the Church of Nigeria's "total rejection of homosexuality". These actions received response from the Archbishop of Canterbury, Justin Welby, who released a statement that said people are able to be members of the Anglican Communion "regardless of sexual orientation" and without mention of celibacy.

Archbishops Foley Beach, of the ACNA, and Henry Ndukuba, of the Church of Nigeria, signed a Joint Statement, on 30 March 2021, reaffirming both churches' common stance on human sexuality, as defined by the Lambeth 1998 resolution 1.10, and by the Jerusalem Declaration of 2008, of the Global Anglican Future Conference.

In 2023, Archbishop Foley Beach was asked to comment on Archbishop of Uganda Stephen Kaziimba's support for Ugandan legislation that allows life imprisonment for Ugandans who engage in gay sex and the death penalty for "aggravated homosexuality". Foley replied, "...we condemn it when we don't really understand it. I don't understand their culture enough to be able to really comment on it."

=== Other churches ===
At the ACNA's inaugural assembly in June 2009, Metropolitan Jonah of the Orthodox Church in America, who was raised Episcopalian, while recognizing theological differences, said that he was "seeking an ecumenical restoration" between Orthodox and Anglicans in the United States. An agreement was announced between Saint Vladimir's Orthodox Theological Seminary and Nashotah House, an Anglo-Catholic seminary, to guide ecumenical relationships and "new dialogue" between the two churches. Archbishop Foley Beach met Metropolitan Hilarion Alfeyev, Chairman of the Department of External Relations of the Russian Orthodox Church, at an ecumenical meeting that took place at St. Vladimir's Orthodox Theological Seminary in Yonkers, New York, on November 8, 2014. The main purpose of the meeting was the prosecution of the Anglican and Orthodox dialogue in the United States and other parts of the world. Metropolitan Tikhon of the Orthodox Church in America was also present and invited Archbishop Foley Beach to the Orthodox All-American Council, which took place in Atlanta, Georgia, in July 2015.

At the invitation of Patriarch Kirill, Archbishop Beach led a nine-member ACNA delegation to Moscow, Russia, to participate in formal ecumenical meetings with the Russian Orthodox Church. The delegation met Metropolitan Hilarion and was officially received by Patriarch Kirill on August 23, 2015. Both churches expressed their desire to develop and deepen the ecumenical relationships between Orthodox and faithful Anglicans through the world. Archbishop Beach delivered a letter of greeting from Archbishop Eliud Wabukala, Archbishop of Kenya and Chairman of the GAFCON. The ACNA is about to start ecumenical relationships with Patriarch Bartholomew I of Constantinople, due to the mediation of Greek Orthodox Bishop Kyrillos Katerelos.

Archbishop Foley Beach and Bishop Kevin Bond Allen met Patriarch Theophilos III, of the Greek Orthodox Church of Jerusalem, at the Church of the Holy Sepulchre, in Jerusalem, on May 31, 2017.

The ACNA representatives had a meeting with Pope Tawadros II of the Coptic Orthodox Church of Egypt, during his visit to the United States, on October 23, 2015, during which he was presented with a letter of Bishop Todd Hunter, welcoming him and celebrating the recent ecumenical dialogue held between Anglican and Coptic Orthodox churches. Pope Tawadros II met Archbishop Foley Beach and Bishop Charlie Masters, of ACNA, during his meeting with several Global South representatives, in Cairo, in November 2015.

The ACNA established dialogue with several Lutheran groups. In March 2010, the Lutheran Church – Missouri Synod announced that it and the ACNA would hold discussions to "explore dialogue". The ACNA has approved a request from the North American Lutheran Church to share clergy where there are vacancies. In addition, there is a Lutheran group which has requested to be admitted into the ACNA as a diocese.

A "Marriage Summit", was held in Dallas, Texas, May 3–5, 2013, with representatives of ACNA and three Lutheran denominations, the Lutheran Church-Missouri Synod, the Lutheran Church-Canada and the North American Lutheran Church. It resulted in an official joint document, "An Affirmation of Marriage", approved by the heads of all the four church bodies and described as "a strong example of biblical ecumenicism at work", defining the divine nature of "marriage to be the life-long union of one man and one woman".

The ACNA has held ten ecumenical dialogue meetings with the Polish National Catholic Church, since the first, held in Scranton, Pennsylvania, on June 19–20, 2012. The most recent took place at St. Vincent's Cathedral, in Bedford, Texas, on February 15–16, 2017.

The ACNA has been involved with evangelical movements such as the Lausanne Conference on World Evangelism and has observer status with the National Association of Evangelicals. It has also established dialogue with the Charismatic Episcopal Church, the Presbyterian Church in America, and the United Methodist Church. The ACNA is also partnering with Messianic Jewish groups. The ACNA has also held ecumenical contacts with the Believers Eastern Church, an Evangelical denomination whose headquarters are situated in Kerala, India.

The ACNA has established friendly ecumenical relationships with the Roman Catholic Church. The Catholic Church was represented by Bishop Kevin Vann at their inaugural Provincial Assembly, in Bedford, Texas, on June 22, 2009. In October 2009, ACNA's leadership reacted to the Roman Catholic Church's proposed creation of personal ordinariates for disaffected traditionalist Anglicans by stating that although they believe that this provision will not be utilized by the great majority of its laity and clergy, they will happily bless those who are drawn to participate in this proposal. The ACNA expressed its support for the Catholic Church's opposition to the 2012 US Health and Human Services' contraceptive mandate, with Archbishop Robert Duncan being one of the signatories of the statement of the Christian Associates of Southwest Pennsylvania, representing 26 Christian denominations, on April 13, 2012. Archbishop Duncan and Bishop Ray Sutton were also invited to the weekly private audience by Pope Benedict XVI, which took place in Rome, on November 28, 2012, whom they meet and greet afterwards on behalf of the ACNA and the Fellowship of Confessing Anglicans. The ACNA Provincial Assembly, which reunited more than 900 participants, and their College of Bishops conclave, which elected Foley Beach as the second Archbishop of the province, took place at the Roman Catholic Benedictine St. Vincent Archabbey Basilica, in Latrobe, Pennsylvania, on June 19–21, 2014, due to the kind permission of Archabbot Douglas Robert Nowicki, a personal friend of Archbishop Duncan. Archbishop Wilton Daniel Gregory of the Roman Catholic Archdiocese of Atlanta offered Foley Beach an African-made crozier, which he used at his investiture ceremony, that took place at the Church of the Apostles, in Atlanta, Georgia, at October 9, 2014. Former Archbishop Gregory Venables of the Anglican Church of the Southern Cone of America read at the ceremony a message by his personal friend Pope Francis, who sent Archbishop Foley Beach his "personal greetings and congratulations as he leads his church in the very important job of revival" and asked Archbishop Venables to embrace him on his behalf.

The ACNA has started official talks with the United States Conference of Catholic Bishops. Bishop Ray Sutton, Provincial Dean for Ecumenical Affairs led the team that met with a USCCB delegation, led by Bishop Mitchell T. Rozanski, Chair of Ecumenical and Interreligious Affairs, in Chicago, Illinois, on October 12, 2016. In 2024, Sutton announced that the Vatican had begun an ecumenical dialogue with the ACNA and GAFCON which excluded the Archbishop of Canterbury, the Church of England, the Episcopal Church, and the Anglican Church of Canada. He stated that the process would be managed by the Vatican's Dicastery for the Doctrine of the Faith (DDF) and not by the Dicastery for Promoting Christian Unity, and that the Prefect of the DDF, with the Pope's approval, had accepted an ACNA proposal for dialogue with the USCCB, which was based on the framework set forth in the 1968 Malta Report, a document on ecumenical dialogue set forth by the Anglican-Roman Catholic Joint Preparatory Commission.

In January 2020, the ACNA endorsed a concordat with the Philippine Independent Catholic Church (formally known as the "International Conference of Philippine Independent Catholic Churches of Jesus Christ" since 2019), a breakaway faction from the Philippine Independent Church, in a meeting held in Melbourne, Florida, which was meant to be presented for approval by the Provincial Council in June that year. Later in the same year, the endorsement was approved and both churches signed a concordat of understanding.

At the 2024 ACNA Provincial Assembly in Latrobe, PA, Bishop Ray Sutton announced several updates on ecumenical relations between the ACNA and other churches. Sutton announced that the ACNA and the Evangelical Lutheran Church of Latvia (ELCL), Latvia's state church, had recognized full communion with one another. In July 2022, Bishop Ryan Reed of the Episcopal Diocese of Fort Worth (also fashioned Anglican Diocese of Fort Worth) and then-ACNA Archbishop Foley Beach were invited by ELCL Archbishop Janis Vanags to participate in the consecration of an ELCL bishop through the laying on of hands. In addition, they were granted pulpit and altar privileges at the Cathedral Church of St. Mary in Riga, Latvia.

Bishop Sutton also announced that the Elder Board of Communio Messianica (CM), a movement of Muslim Background Believers, had determined to become Anglican and join GAFCON, through discussions with the Reformed Episcopal Church (REC), a diocese of the ACNA. In March 2024, Communio Messianica's Yassir Eric was consecrated a bishop by Rwandan Anglican Archbishop and GAFCON Chairman Laurent Mbanda at Holy Trinity Cathedral in Kigali, Rwanda.

=== Interfaith ===
In August 2010, the executive committee approved the creation of a task force on "Islam and interfaith engagement". Regarding the task force, Julian Dobbs, a member of the ACNA College of Bishops and Missionary Bishop of the Convocation of Anglicans in North America, stated, "we need to undertake a prayerful, sensitive and honest approach to the issues involved".

Dobbs, the ACNA's dean and acting primate, has long warned about the purported dangers of Islamic religion. In 2009, he warned that a Muslim day of prayer at the United States Capitol was "part of a well-defined strategy to Islamize American society and replace the Bible with the Koran, the cross with the Islamic crescent and the church bells with the Athan [the Muslim call to prayer]" and that "the time has come for the American public to call Islam to account." In a 2022 letter on his website, Dobbs referred to the September 11 attacks as the “Islamic terror attacks" and wrote that the violence on September 11 was carried out in the name of "a religion that is still intolerant" of other faiths.

In its 2011 annual report, the ACNA said it was forming partnerships with Messianic Jewish groups to proselytize.

Archbishop Foley Beach and Bishop Charlie Masters, of ACNA, met the Grand Imam of Al-Azhar, Ahmed el-Tayeb, when he welcomed a delegation of several Global South representatives during their visit to Egypt in November 2015. Ahmed el-Tayeb expressed the "importance of the partnership and collegiality between religious leaders for the common good of humanity" and his solidarity with the Anglican realignment. He also stated that Christians and Muslims should be united in their opposition to the pressure for the acceptance of same-sex marriage and homosexual practice, especially in the western world.

He visited Pakistan in November 2019, at invitation of the Kul Masalak Ulama Board Leadership, where he attended an interfaith gathering with Muslim scholars, in Lahore, on 19 November 2019.

In the wake of the terrorist attack to the Tree of Life Synagogue, in Pittsburgh, on October 27, 2018, Archbishop Beach expressed his full solidarity with the Jewish communities of the United States and endorsed the "ShowUpForShabbat" initiative by which ACNA parish members were to attend local synagogues for the Shabbat.

== See also ==
- List of bishops of the Anglican Church in North America
- Category:American Anglican Church in North America members
