= Taylor Marshall =

American traditionalist Catholic writer (born 1978)

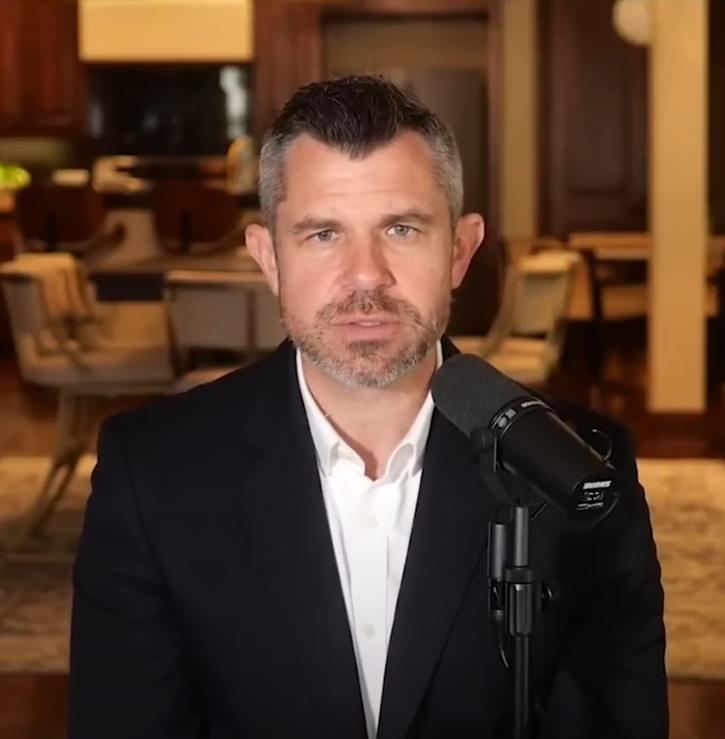
- Marshall in 2023
- Born: Taylor Reed Marshall; March 29, 1978 (age 48); Fort Worth, Texas, U.S.
- Education: Texas A&M University (BA); Westminster Theological Seminary (MA); University of Dallas (MA, PhD)
- Occupations: Apologist; Author; Podcaster; Influencer; Chancellor; Professor; Clergy
- Movement: Traditionalist Catholicism
- Spouse: Joy McPherson (m. 2001)
- Children: 8

Ordination history
History
Priestly ordination
- Ordained by: Jack Iker
- Website: taylormarshall.com

Taylor Reed Marshall (born March 29, 1978) is an American traditionalist Catholic writer, podcaster, and YouTube commentator.

A former priest of the Episcopal Church, Marshall converted to Catholicism and became a prominent advocate of traditionalist Catholicism. Marshall promotes a number of conspiracy theories regarding the infiltration of the Catholic Church, and openly criticises the Catholic hierarchy, including Pope Leo XIV. He is the author of multiple books, including Infiltration: The Plot to Destroy the Church from Within and his bestselling historical fiction series Sword and Serpent. Marshall currently teaches at the New Saint Thomas Institute, an online Catholic education institute that he founded in 2013, and hosts the Dr. Taylor Marshall Podcast, which has over 2 million subscribers on YouTube.

== Education and ordained ministry ==
Marshall graduated magna cum laude from Texas A&M University in 2000 with a Bachelor of Arts degree in philosophy. After studying at Westminster Theological Seminary and Nashotah House, Marshall was ordained a priest of the Episcopal Church in 2005 by Jack Iker, the Bishop of Fort Worth. Marshall had previously served as a youth minister at Saint Andrew's Episcopal Church while an Episcopal deacon.

Shortly thereafter, in 2006, he and his wife converted to Catholicism. They received confirmation in the Catholic Church from Bishop Kevin Vann in May 2006.

== Post-conversion ==
In 2009, Marshall earned his Master of Arts degree in philosophy, and in 2011 earned a Doctor of Philosophy degree in philosophy, at the University of Dallas with his 600-page doctoral dissertation "Thomas Aquinas on Natural Law and the Twofold Beatitude of Humanity." From January 2012 until June 2013, Marshall served as the chancellor of the former College of Saints John Fisher & Thomas More. Prior to his administrative work at the college, he was a professor of philosophy. He resigned from the college in June 2013, citing moral, theological, and financial discrepancies regarding the college's presidency, including the college's public repudiation of the Second Vatican Council and financial mismanagement that had crippled the institution. Marshall also formerly served as the assistant director of the Archdiocese of Washington's Catholic Information Center.

He is a founder of the New Saint Thomas Institute, an online Catholic theology educational programme with thousands of students globally, and the Troops of Saint George, a Catholic scouting organisation founded in 2013.

== Media and YouTube channel ==
Marshall is the host of the Dr. Taylor Marshall Podcast, which is primarily broadcast on his YouTube channel. As of 2026, his channel has amassed over 2 million subscribers and more than 190 million views. The podcast focuses on Catholic theology, news, and commentary from a traditionalist perspective, frequently criticising modernism within the Church and the actions of Pope Leo XIV. His channel has grown significantly in influence, making him one of the most prominent voices in traditionalist Catholic media.

Marshall regularly comments on statements from Archbishop Carlo Maria Viganò, former Apostolic Nuncio to the United States, and has been a prominent supporter of Viganò's criticisms of the Vatican. Following Viganò's excommunication for schism in July 2024, Marshall continued to discuss and interview the archbishop.

== Controversy and conspiracy theories ==
Marshall has been widely criticised by both secular and Catholic media for promoting conspiracy theories. His 2019 book, Infiltration: The Plot to Destroy the Church from Within, posits a conspiracy theory that, over the last two centuries, the hierarchy of the Catholic Church has been actively subverted by Freemasons, Communists, and Modernists to destroy the Church. The foreword of the book was written by Bishop Athanasius Schneider. The book has been controversial in Catholic circles, drawing both positive and negative reviews. Critics such as Dr Jeff Mirus and Fr Dwight Longenecker have characterised the book as promoting an "idiot's guide to the problems of the Church" based on flawed historical analysis, while others have defended it as raising plausible concerns about infiltration.

In October 2019, Marshall received media attention for publicising an incident at the Catholic Church's Amazon Synod in which Alexander Tschugguel and an accomplice filmed themselves removing indigenous statues, reportedly of Pachamama, from the Church of Santa Maria in Traspontina in Rome and throwing them into the Tiber river. In March 2020, Marshall revealed that he had personally funded Tschugguel's trip to Rome and uploaded the video of the theft. Commentators at Where Peter Is have suggested that Marshall's actions and rhetoric regarding the Amazon Synod were a significant factor in the Vatican's subsequent restrictions on the Traditional Latin Mass, promulgated in the motu proprio Traditionis custodes.

== Political involvement ==
Marshall has been active in American politics, particularly in his support for Donald Trump. He received attention from Donald Trump's 2020 presidential campaign for popularising Archbishop Viganò's letter warning of a deep state working to undermine the United States of America. Marshall was noticed by the campaign in return, and retweeted on the president's Twitter account. He was also appointed to the advisory board of the "Catholics for Trump" coalition. Traditionalist Catholic writer Matthew Walther criticised both Marshall's advocacy for then-President Trump and his claims against Pope Francis, accusing Marshall of "distorting or simply lying" about the pope in order to anger Catholics.

In May 2023, Marshall launched an independent "Christ the King" presidential bid, rejecting church–state separation and advocating for a society based on Christian principles. Absent FEC filing or ballot access, the campaign halted any operation by July 2023.

== Personal life ==
Marshall met his wife, Joy (née McPherson ), in 1999. They were married on June 9, 2001, at Saint Andrew's Episcopal Church in Fort Worth, Texas. They have eight children.

== Books ==
With the exception of Infiltration and Christian Patriot, Marshall's books are self-published under the imprint of Saint John Press and Media, a company held and managed by Marshall.

- The Origins of Catholicism trilogy
  - The Crucified Rabbi: Judaism and the Origins of Catholic Christianity (Saint John Press, 2009 ) ISBN 9780578038346
  - The Catholic Perspective on Paul: Paul and the Origins of Catholic Christianity (Saint John Press, 2010) ISBN 9780578050164
  - The Eternal City: Rome & the Origins of Catholic Christianity (Saint John Press, 2012) ISBN 9780988442504
- Thomas Aquinas in 50 Pages: A Layman's Quick Guide to Thomism (Saint John Press, 2014) ISBN 9780988442511
- The Sword and Serpent trilogy (Historical fiction)
  - Sword and Serpent (Saint John Press, 2014) ISBN 9780988442559
  - The Tenth Region of the Night (Saint John Press, 2016) ISBN 9780988442573
  - Storm of Fire and Blood (Saint John Press, 2017) ISBN 9780988442597
- Saint Augustine in 50 Pages: The Layman's Quick Guide to Augustinianism (Saint John Press, 2015)
- Infiltration: The Plot to Destroy the Church from Within (Sophia Institute Press, 2019) ISBN 9781622828463
- The Rosary in 50 Pages: The Layman's Quick Guide to Mary's Psalter (Saint John Press, 2020) ISBN 9780999658611
- Antichrist and Apocalypse: The 21 Prophecies of Revelation Unveiled and Described (Saint John Press, 2022) ISBN 9780999658635
- Christian Patriot: 12 Ways to Create One Nation Under God (Post Hill Press, 2025) ISBN 9798895651858 (Foreword by Harrison Butker)
