= St. Vincent's Cathedral =

Anglican cathedral of the Episcopal Diocese of Fort Worth

Coordinates: 32.8313°N 97.1416°W

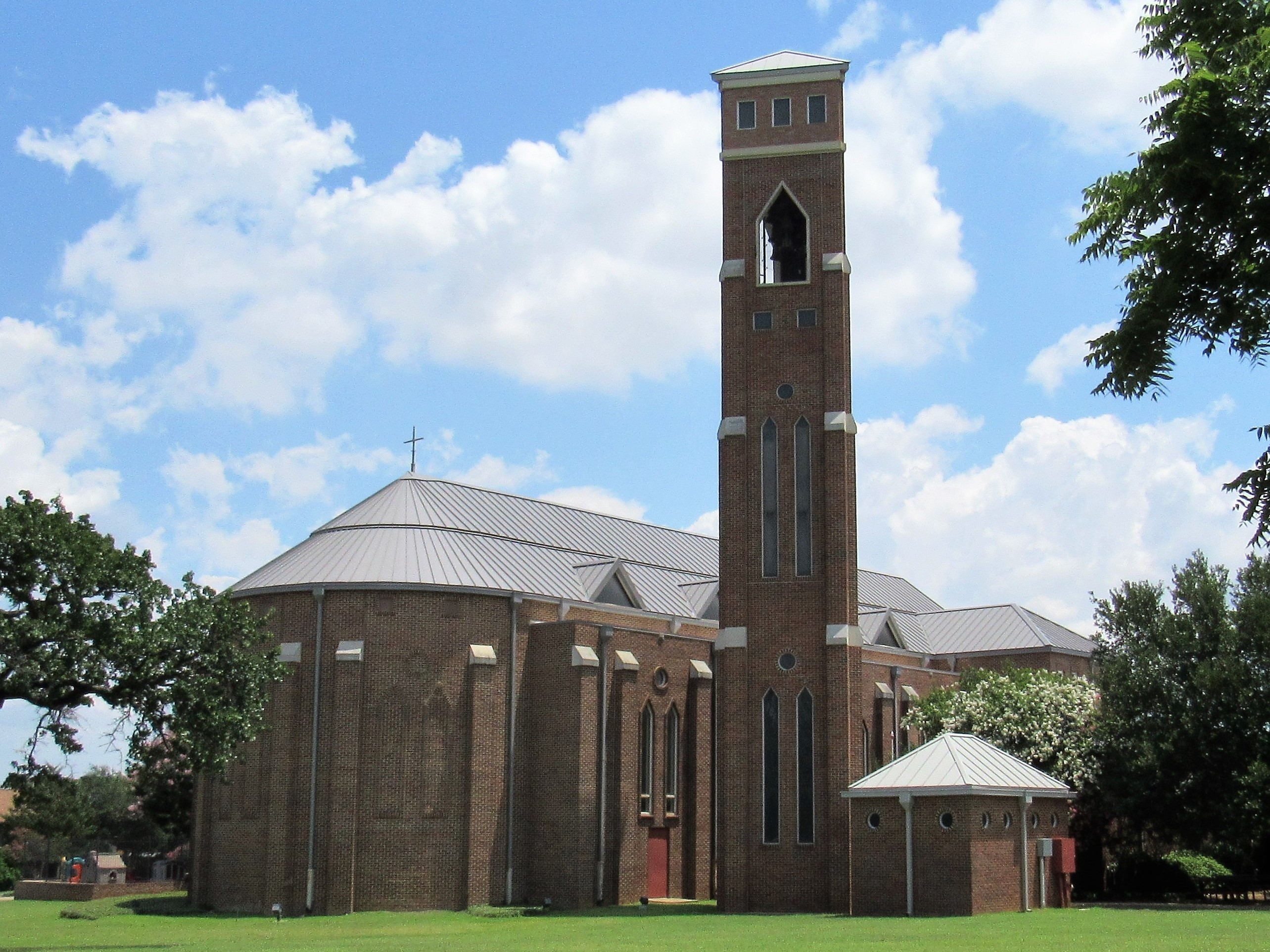
- St. Vincent's Cathedral
- Location: Bedford, Texas
- Country: United States
- Denomination: Anglican Church in North America
- Website: www.stvincentscathedral.org

History
- Founded: 1955
- Dedicated: 1989

Administration
- Diocese: Fort Worth

Clergy
- Bishop: The Rt. Rev. Ryan Reed
- Dean: The Very Rev. Mark Polley

St. Vincent's Cathedral is an Anglican church in Bedford, Texas. It is the cathedral of the Episcopal Diocese of Fort Worth. The cathedral played a major part in the Anglican realignment by hosting the inaugural assembly in 2009 where the Anglican Church in North America was constituted.

== History ==
Named in honor of St. Vincent of Zaragoza, St. Vincent's was founded in 1955 as part of the Episcopal Diocese of Dallas. It moved to its current site in 1989. In 1995, the church—built in a stripped modern Gothic style with a three-sided campanile—was designated the pro-cathedral of the Diocese of Fort Worth, which had been formed out of the Dallas diocese in 1983. St. Vincent's was consecrated as the cathedral in December 2007.

In 2005, St. Vincent's hosted an Anglican Communion Network meeting to respond to the Windsor report. Participants in that meeting agreed to a covenant of actions in response.

In 2019, the cathedral's dean, the Very Rev. Ryan Reed, SSC, was elected bishop coadjutor of the Diocese of Fort Worth. He succeeded Jack Iker as diocesan bishop later that year.

== Role in ACNA founding ==
St. Vincent's hosted the inaugural assembly of the Anglican Church in North America on April 21–25, 2009. Representatives of the Dioceses of Fort Worth, Pittsburgh, Quincy and San Joaquin, plus the Common Cause Partnership (at the time, the American Anglican Council, Anglican Coalition in Canada, Anglican Communion Network, Anglican Mission in the Americas, Anglican Network in Canada, Convocation of Anglicans in North America, Forward in Faith North America, missionary convocations from the Anglican provinces of Kenya, the Southern Cone and Uganda, plus the Reformed Episcopal Church and the Reformed Communion) met at St. Vincent's to ratify the constitution and canons of the new province.

At this meeting, a number of major steps were taken to officially establish the new denomination, including the election of Robert Duncan, bishop of Pittsburgh, as ACNA's first archbishop.

Rick Warren, a leading American evangelical, and Metropolitan Jonah Paffhausen, leader of the Orthodox Church in America, addressed the audience. There were nine provinces in the Anglican Communion that sent official representatives to the assembly, namely the Church of the Province of West Africa, the Church of Nigeria, the Church of Uganda, the Anglican Church of Kenya, represented by Archbishop Benjamin Nzimbi, the Anglican Province of the Southern Cone, including Archbishop Gregory Venables, the Episcopal Church in Jerusalem and the Middle East, the Church of the Province of Myanmar, the Church of the Province of South East Asia and the Church of the Province of Rwanda. Other ecumenical observers included Bishop Walter Grundorf of the Anglican Province of America, Samuel Nafzger of the Lutheran Church–Missouri Synod, and Bishop Kevin Vann of the Roman Catholic Diocese of Fort Worth. Leaders from three Anglican provinces, John Chew of the Church of the Province of South East Asia, Archbishop Peter Jensen of the Anglican Diocese of Sydney and the Fellowship of Confessing Anglicans and Mouneer Anis, Presiding Bishop of the Episcopal Church in Jerusalem and the Middle East, formally announced support for the ACNA. From England, Bishop Wallace Benn and Archdeacon Michael Lawson sent greetings from the Church of England Evangelical Council. Archbishop of Canterbury Rowan Williams sent retired Seychelles Bishop Santosh Marray of the Province of the Indian Ocean to serve as his observer.

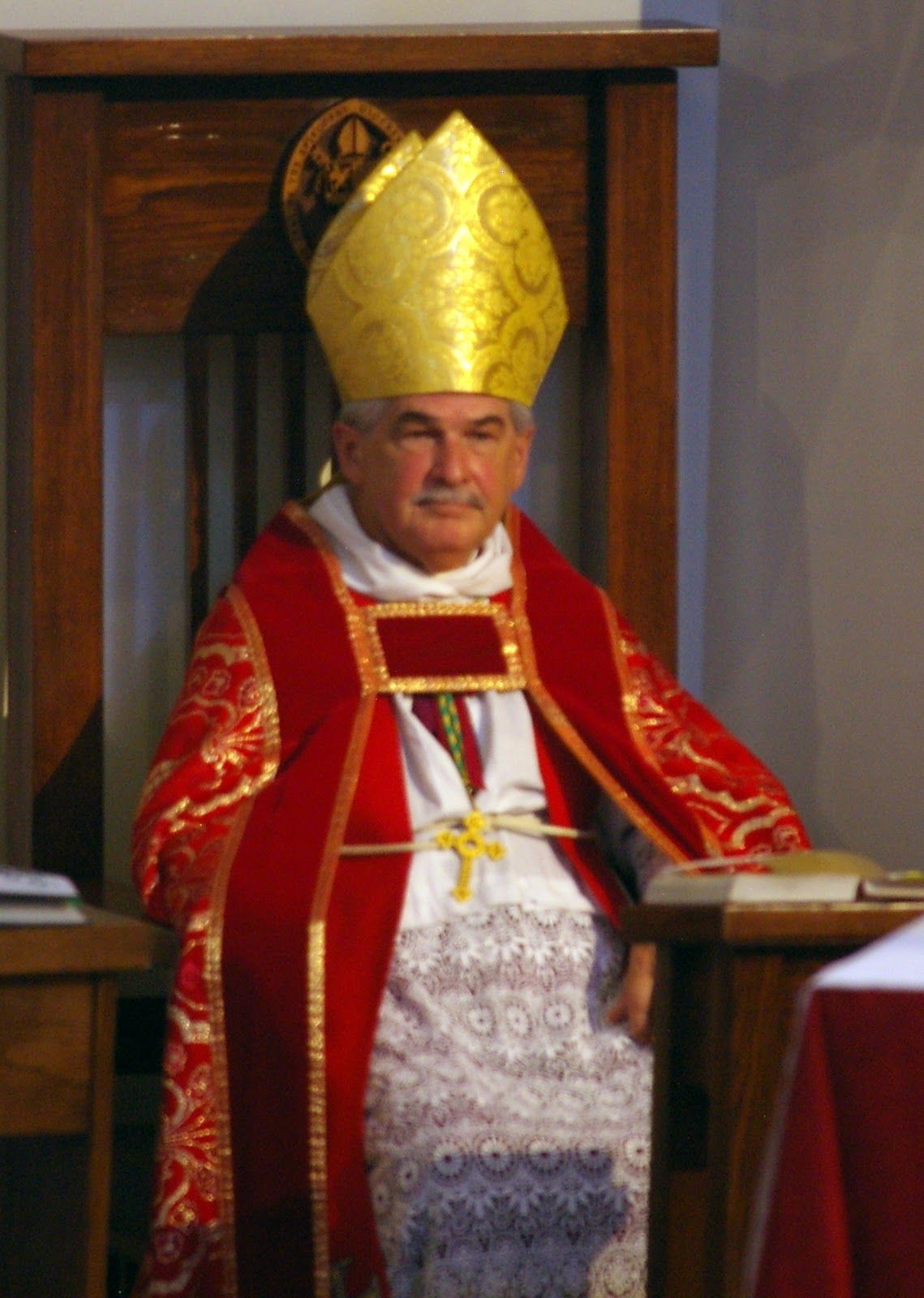
Former Bishop of Fort Worth Jack Leo Iker in his cathedra at St. Vincent's Cathedral

== Churchmanship ==
As part of the Diocese of Fort Worth, St. Vincent's is a hub for Anglo-Catholic worship and practice. The cathedral uses the 2019 Book of Common Prayer and The Hymnal 1982. The cathedral has hosted events for Forward in Faith North America and is a member of the American Anglican Council.

== Facilities ==
St. Vincent's includes an on-site columbarium. The cathedral formerly hosted St. Vincent's Cathedral School, which has since closed.
