= Ryan Reed (bishop) =

American Anglican bishop (born 1967)

The Right Reverend Ryan Reed SSC
- Bishop of Fort Worth
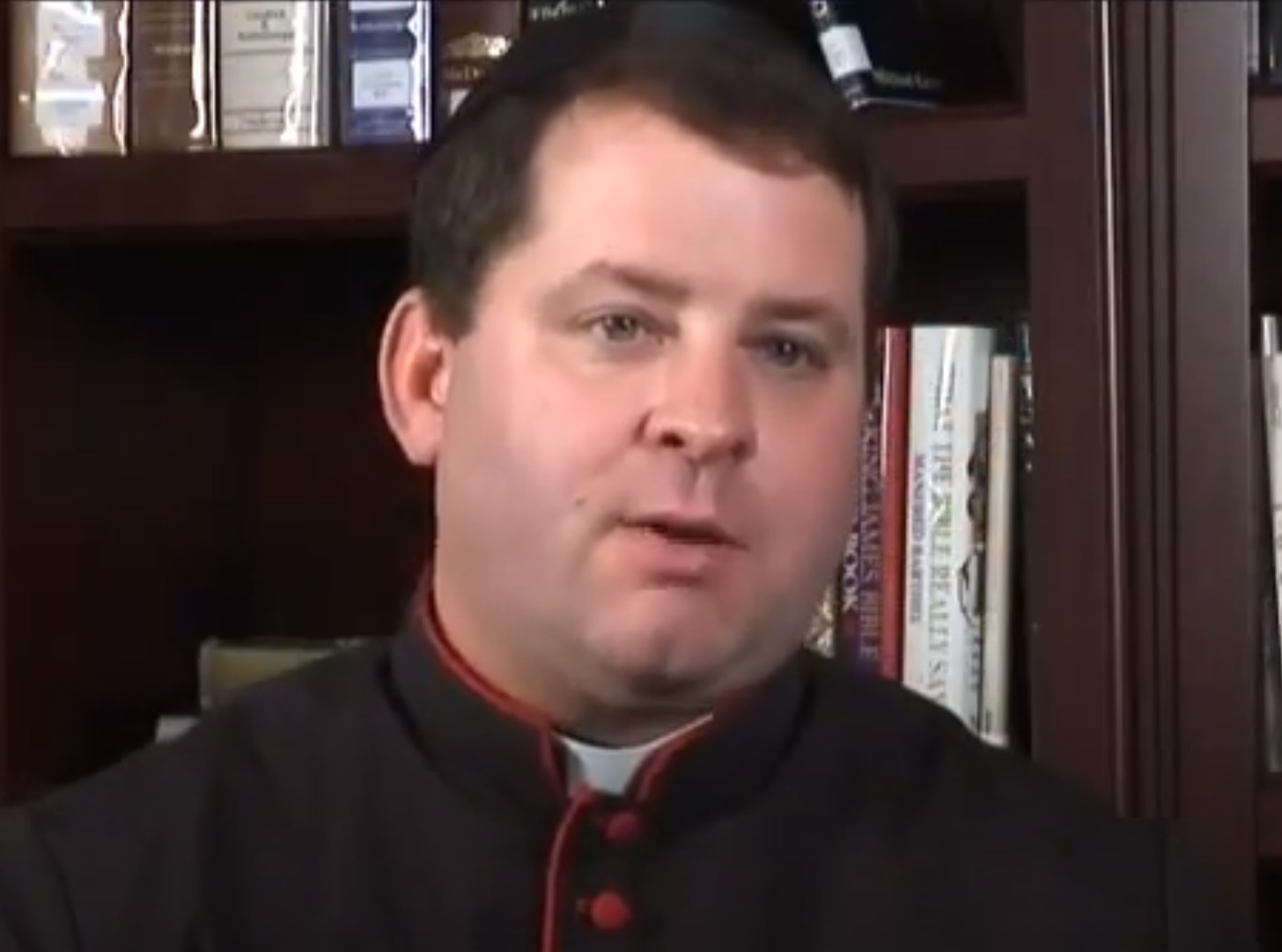
- Reed interviewed in a 2005 Anglican Communion Network documentary.
- Church: Anglican Church in North America
- Diocese: Fort Worth
- In office: 2020–present
- Predecessor: Jack Iker
- Previous posts: Dean, St. Vincent's Cathedral

Orders
- Ordination: 1996 (diaconate); 1997 (priesthood) by Jack Iker
- Consecration: September 21, 2019 by Foley Beach (chief consecrator), Keith Ackerman, William Wantland, Jack Iker (co-consecrators)

Personal details
- Born: Ryan Spencer Reed; 1967 (age 58–59) Omaha, Nebraska
- Education: Texas A&M University; Trinity School for Ministry

Ryan Spencer Reed SSC (born 1967) is an American Anglican bishop. Since 2020, he has been the fourth diocesan bishop of the Episcopal Diocese of Fort Worth in the Anglican Church in North America.

== Early life and education ==
Reed was born in Omaha, Nebraska, in 1967. He has said that his birth mother was an unwed teenager who gave him up for adoption, an experience that he has said informs his pro-life views. Reed was raised and confirmed in the Episcopal Church and knew as a child that he wanted to become a priest. He was raised in Texas and attended Texas A&M University, where he was in the TAMU Corps of Cadets. He graduated in 1990, after which he became youth minister at St. Andrew's Episcopal Church in Fort Worth.

Reed married Kathy Marie Warren in 1991 at St. Andrew's; they have one adult daughter. From 1993 to 1996, he studied for his M.Div. at Trinity School for Ministry.

== Ordained ministry ==
Reed returned to Fort Worth and was ordained to the diaconate by Bishop Jack Iker in 1996 and to the priesthood in 1997. He served his curacy at St. Vincent's Cathedral, and then as vicar of Ascension and St. Mark in Bridgeport from 1998 to 2002. In 2002, Reed returned to St. Vincent's as dean, overseeing the cathedral and its now-defunct affiliated school. During his time as dean, the Episcopal Diocese of Fort Worth disaffiliated from the Episcopal Church. St. Vincent's was the location for the inaugural provincial assembly of the Anglican Church in North America.

Reed is from the Anglo-Catholic tradition within Anglicanism and has been a member of the Society of the Holy Cross since 1999. He became a Forward in Faith North America council member in 2008. In addition to his parish work, Reed was twice for a combined 11 years the standing committee president in the Diocese of Fort Worth and served on the ACNA's executive committee.

== Episcopacy ==
On June 1, 2019, Reed was elected bishop coadjutor of the Diocese of Fort Worth. He was consecrated on September 21, 2019, by Archbishop Foley Beach. Iker retired at the end of 2019, and Reed was enthroned at St. Vincent's on January 5, 2020.

In 2021, under Reed's leadership, a group of churches in the Diocese of Fort Worth and the Diocese of Churches for the Sake of Others began exploring the creation of a ACNA missionary district and proto-diocese in the Dallas area, which to begin would be a deanery of the Diocese of Fort Worth.

After two women were consecrated as bishops in GAFCON member province the Anglican Church of Kenya, Reed and the diocese's standing committee issued a statement in 2021 recognizing "that the ordination of women has been a contentious and divisive issue" and "urg[ing] our brethren and spiritual fathers to move away from divisiveness, not toward it. Citing the ACNA's constitutional moratorium on women bishops, "This standing committee, together with our bishop, believes that the same principle of restraint should be applied locally as well as in the global church."

=== Conclusion of litigation ===
Reed's early episcopacy was dominated by the resolution of the long-running litigation between the Diocese of Fort Worth and the Episcopal Church. In May 2020, the Texas Supreme Court overturned an appellate court decision awarding the Episcopal Diocese of Fort Worth's property, valued at over $100 million, to the Episcopal Church-affiliated diocese. The court ruled that resolving the property dispute did not require ecclesiastical questions but that "under the governing documents, the withdrawing faction is the Episcopal Diocese of Fort Worth, and the trial court properly granted summary judgment in the withdrawing faction's favor". The court's ruling also affirmed the ACNA diocese as the owner of the diocesan name and seal, and the Episcopal diocese renamed itself the Episcopal Church in North Texas. Reed declared Pentecost Sunday 2020 to be a day of fasting and rededication in the Diocese of Fort Worth.

In the fall of 2020, the Episcopal Church appealed to the U.S. Supreme Court, which refused to hear the case in February 2021. In April 2021, the Diocese of Fort Worth received possession of six church properties previously occupied by the Episcopal Church in North Texas that had not settled with the diocese prior to the commencement of litigation by the Episcopal Church in 2008. Some of the churches returned were stripped of personal property, down to the pews, altar fixtures, crucifixes, sheet music and kitchen appliances in some cases. The Texas Supreme Court in September 2021 ordered all personal property returned to the ACNA diocese within seven days, although some legal proceedings continued. With the return of property, the Episcopal Diocese of Fort Worth began replanting new congregations in the buildings, which Reed noted had been vacant for more than a year due to virtual worship during the COVID-19 pandemic.

That summer, the Episcopal Church paid $4.5 million in legal fees to the Episcopal Diocese of Fort Worth in a mediated settlement. "The Diocese made every attempt to avoid this litigation, beginning before its dissociation from TEC in 2008," Reed said. "Unfortunately, negotiations ended abruptly after three church properties were released to TEC-majority congregations when the Presiding Bishop and local TEC leaders brought suit in April 2009, foreclosing on the possibility of any other settlement. As we put more than a decade of litigation behind us, we can once again devote ourselves to sharing the transforming love of Jesus Christ and our mission to equip the saints for the work of ministry. We look forward now in hope and trust for Christ’s leading." ACNA parishes that had been legally constrained by Episcopal Church objections from undertaking new construction were also free to resume these projects.

Anglican Communion titles
Preceded by Jack Iker	IV Bishop of Fort Worth; 2020–present	Incumbent
