= Jacob Worley =

American Anglican bishop

The Right Reverend Jacob C. Worley
- Bishop of Cascadia
- Church: Anglican Church in North America
- Diocese: Cascadia
- In office: 2024–present
- Predecessor: Kevin Bond Allen
- Other posts: Rector, St. Andrew's Anglican Church (2018–2023); Bishop-elect, Diocese of Caledonia (2017)

Orders
- Ordination: 2004 (diaconate); 2005 (priesthood)
- Consecration: February 24, 2024 by Foley Beach

Personal details
- Born: 1969 (age 56–57) Alabama

Jacob Christopher Worley (born 1969) is an American Anglican bishop. Since 2024, he has been the second diocesan bishop of the Diocese of Cascadia in the Anglican Church in North America. He has also served as a priest in the Episcopal Church, the Anglican Mission in America, the Church of Ireland, and the Anglican Church of Canada. In 2017, he was elected bishop of Caledonia, but the bishops of the Ecclesiastical Province of British Columbia and Yukon did not assent to the election because of Worley's involvement in Anglican realignment under the Anglican Church of Rwanda.

== Early life and education ==
Worley was born in Alabama and moved to Gallup, New Mexico, around the age of five, where he was raised. He studied zoology and botany at Western New Mexico University, graduating with a B.S. in 1995. During his time at WNMU, he converted to Christianity and married his wife, Kelly. They have five adult children. After college, Worley worked for several years as a wildlife biologist in New Mexico, where he worked on wildlife censuses, habitat delineation, and environmental assessments for the United States Forest Service, the International Boundary and Water Commission, Phelps Dodge and the White Sands Missile Range.

During his time in college, Worley experienced a call to ordained ministry. He enrolled in Trinity School for Ministry in 2001 and was ordained deacon in 2004 upon graduation and a priest in 2005. Both ordinations took place in the Episcopal Diocese of the Rio Grande. He served a curacy in Michigan and then as an assistant priest and interim rector at an Episcopal church in Las Cruces.

== Ordained ministry ==
In 2007, as part of the Anglican realignment, Worley planted St. Patrick’s Anglican Church in Las Cruces. As a priest in the Anglican Mission in America, Worley's clergy orders were held in the Anglican Church of Rwanda. In 2008, Worley was deposed by the Episcopal Church along with several other priests who departed around the same time. Worley was also a board member and teacher at Covenant Christian Academy in La Union, New Mexico.

In 2013, Worley served a short stint as rector of the three-church Anglican Parish of the North Peace in the Diocese of Caledonia, Anglican Church of Canada. Later that year, he was called to the Church of Ireland to serve as incumbent of the Kilmoremoy Union of Parishes, a five-point parish that included Castleconnor Parish Church in the then-Diocese of Tuam, Killala and Achonry. During this time, he also served as chairman of Leafoney National School and St. Michael’s National School.

Worley returned to the Diocese of Caledonia in 2014 to serve as rector of a three-church parish in the Bulkley Valley consisting of St. James’ Anglican Church in Smithers, St. John the Divine Anglican Church in Quick, and St. Clement’s Anglican Church in Houston. "When we were in Fort St. John, we fell in love with Canada. Alongside that, we fell in love with the people of Canada," Worley told local media at the time of his return to British Columbia.

=== Election as bishop of Caledonia ===
In April 2017, Worley was nominated to succeed William Anderson as bishop of Caledonia. He was elected on the eighth ballot. However, Worley's election was subject to the approval of the bishops of the Ecclesiastical Province of British Columbia and Yukon. In May 2017, the bishops formally objected to Worley's election on the grounds that he had served in the AMIA, which was the canonical jurisdiction of the Anglican Church of Rwanda while being located in the geographical jurisdiction of the Episcopal Church.

"[T]he majority of the House concluded that within the past five years the Rev. Worley has held—and continues to hold—views contrary to the Discipline of the Anglican Church of Canada,” Metropolitan John Privett was quoted as saying. "The view he held and holds is that it is acceptable and permissible for a priest of one church of the Anglican Communion to exercise priestly ministry in the geographical jurisdiction of a second church of the Anglican Communion without the permission of the Ecclesiastical Authority of that second church."

The diocesan administrator, the Rev. Gwen Andrews, said she was "shocked" by the bishops’ decision because the diocesan search committee vetting episcopal candidates had notified Privett of Worley's background, "pointing out his missionary work under the bishop of Rwanda and asking if it posed a problem to his candidacy. The search committee told her, Andrews said, that Privett did not think it would pose a problem." Privett later told media that his comments were "off the cuff," based on Worley's then-residence in the Diocese of Caledonia. "In itself, it may or may not have been an issue," Privett said. "At that point, it didn’t seem to be, because he was functioning in the Diocese of Caledonia and I’d assumed that the Diocese of Caledonia had received him in due order. . . . It was only when it came to the House of Bishops, when we were looking primarily at the criteria in the provincial canon, that we recognized that we needed to look further than we had been before."

In November 2017, Worley was dismissed "without cause" as a priest and with no explanation from Privett. The dismissal resulted in the termination of Worley's Canadian residency permit, forcing the family to return immediately to the United States. Worley later said: "We were painfully forced to leave the Pacific Northwest which we know God has called us to."

The bishops' rejection of Worley's election triggered criticism from the theologically conservative wing of the Anglican Church. "We want to believe that this decision was reached in a fair and reasonable manner, but we are also aware that to many Anglicans in the pew it looks unfair and deliberately skewed—especially given some recent history," commented the head of the Anglican Communion Alliance. In protest, retired bishop Anderson withdrew from the Anglican Church of Canada and joined the Anglican Network in Canada, the ACNA's local diocese. The editor of The Anglican Planet observed that "[t]his incident has cost the Anglican Church of Canada a fine priest and should-be bishop in Jacob Worley and a fine bishop in William Anderson. It has devastated the Diocese of Caledonia, destroyed a parish and undermined the credibility of all involved."

=== Return to the United States and the ACNA ===
After returning to the United States, Worley was in July 2018 appointed rector of St. Andrew's Anglican Church in Fort Worth, Texas, noted as a low-church parish in the Anglo-Catholic Diocese of Fort Worth. While in Fort Worth, Worley served as a board member of the American Anglican Council, on the diocesan executive committee and on the bishop search committee for the election of Ryan Reed.

In 2023, Worley was elected the second bishop of the Diocese of Cascadia to succeed Kevin Bond Allen. At the time of his election, Worley told the diocese that "the Lord put the Pacific Northwest in our hearts years ago when I distinctly heard Him tell me, 'These are your people. This is your place.' . . . When God calls us, He appoints us to a people, a place, and an office or task. . . . The people of the Pacific Northwest are our people. It is our place where we are called. And I know that I am called to the office of bishop because the local body of clergy and lay have affirmed it once already."

On February 24, 2024, Archbishop Foley Beach consecrated and installed Worley as bishop in Shoreline, Washington.

Religious titles
Preceded by Kevin Bond Allen	II Bishop of Cascadia; 2024–present	Incumbent
