= Cody Campbell (businessman) =

American businessman and football player (born 1981)

Cody C. Campbell
- Born: September 29, 1981 (age 44); Lubbock, Texas, U.S.
- Education: Texas Tech University (BBA, MS)
- Occupations: Businessman, former professional athlete
- Years active: 2008–present
- Known for: Oil & gas entrepreneur, energy investments in Permian Basin; Major Texas Tech Red Raiders booster
- Title: CEO of Double Eagle Energy Holdings
- Board member of: Texas Tech University System Board of Regents (Chairman, 2025–); Texas Public Policy Foundation

Cody Cagle Campbell (born September 29, 1981) is an American businessman and former college and professional athlete. He played as an offensive lineman for the Texas Tech Red Raiders and the Indianapolis Colts.

He currently serves as co-CEO, and was the co-founder, of Double Eagle Energy Holdings, an upstream oil and gas company headquartered in Fort Worth, Texas. Campbell has been a member of the Texas Tech University System board of regents since April 2021 and the board chair since April 2025, and has played a major role in his alma mater's NIL initiative.

== Early life ==
Campbell was born in Lubbock, Texas, the child of Cliff and Reagan (née Cagle) Campbell. He is the older of two children; he has a younger brother, Brady. His father Cliff played football at Texas Tech University. He is a fourth-generation Tech alumnus, with one of his great-grandfathers having been in Tech's first entering class in 1925.

Campbell grew up in Canyon, Texas, and graduated from Canyon High School. For his play on Canyon High School’s football team, Campbell was named an All-State offensive lineman. Additionally, Campbell was a National Merit Scholar.

== College career ==
Campbell was part of coach Mike Leach's first recruiting class at Texas Tech in 2000; after redshirting the 2000 season, he was a four-year letterman and two-year starter for the Red Raiders. During his time at Texas Tech, Campbell received multiple All Big 12 and Academic Big 12 Honors as an offensive guard.

He graduated from Texas Tech with a double major BBA in Finance and Business Economics with Honors, and a Master of Science in Finance.

== NFL career ==
Campbell was undrafted during the 2005 season but signed a free-agent contract with the Indianapolis Colts immediately after the draft. He remained a member of the team until August 2006, when his football career was cut short by a severe injury.

== Business career ==
Campbell began his business career while still a student at Texas Tech, founding a small real estate company with his childhood friend, football teammate, and future Double Eagle co-founder John Sellers.After his football career, Campbell re-entered the real estate space and took a position with Paul Kite's company in Indianapolis, Indiana.

In 2008, Campbell partnered with Sellers to pursue opportunities in the oilfield. Starting as the only employees, the two began acquiring oil and gas assets in the Haynesville Shale, the Eagle Ford Shale, and the Permian Basin areas. The duo named their company “Double Eagle” in homage to the hometown high school mascot. Over time, the pair built an operating team, and began drilling their own wells, eventually moving into highly technical horizontal drilling.

Campbell and Sellers joined forces with Apollo Global Management in 2013 to pursue opportunities in the Anadarko and Ardmore Basins of Oklahoma, while maintaining their operations in other basins. This joint venture with Apollo, called Double Eagle Energy Holdings, was sold to Aubrey McClendon's American Energy Non-Op in November 2014.

In 2015, Sellers and Campbell formed Double Eagle Energy Holdings II. The company was sold to Parsley Energy in 2017.

Following the sale of Double Eagle Energy Holdings II, Sellers and Campbell formed Double Eagle Energy Holdings III in the Midland Basin.

The pair merged their company with FourPoint Energy to create Double Point Energy in 2018, which sold to Pioneer Natural Resources in April 2021.

In 2022, Campbell and Sellers subsequently formed Double Eagle Energy Holding IV, this time in partnership with Encap Energy Capital. The company accumulated a large acreage position once again in the Midland Basin before selling to Diamondback Natural Resources in February 2025.

In addition to Double Eagle, Sellers and Campbell are also CEOs and co-founders of Tumbleweed Royalty, which is a large mineral and royalty acquisition company that operates across the United States. Tumbleweed Royalty IV was sold to Viper Energy Inc. in September 2024.

== Texas Tech University ==
Governor Greg Abbott appointed Campbell to the Texas Tech System Board of Regents in 2021, and he was elected Chairman of the Board in 2025.

Campbell helped fund a renovation of Texas Tech’s athletic facilities. The football field at Galaxy Stadium was named “Cody Campbell Field” in his honor. Campbell, along with John Sellers, founded Texas Tech’s Name Image and Likeness (NIL) Collective, the Matador Club.

Campbell was named the Texas Tech Rawls College of Business Distinguished Alumnus in 2019.

== Personal life ==
Campbell is married to Tara Campbell. The couple met while students at Texas Tech and have four children together.

Campbell is on the board of directors of the Texas Public Policy Foundation and was a board member and is a distinguished fellow at the America First Policy Institute. Campbell also serves on the board of trustees of All Saints' Episcopal School of Fort Worth.
