= St. Charles Anglican Cathedral =

Anglican church in the United States

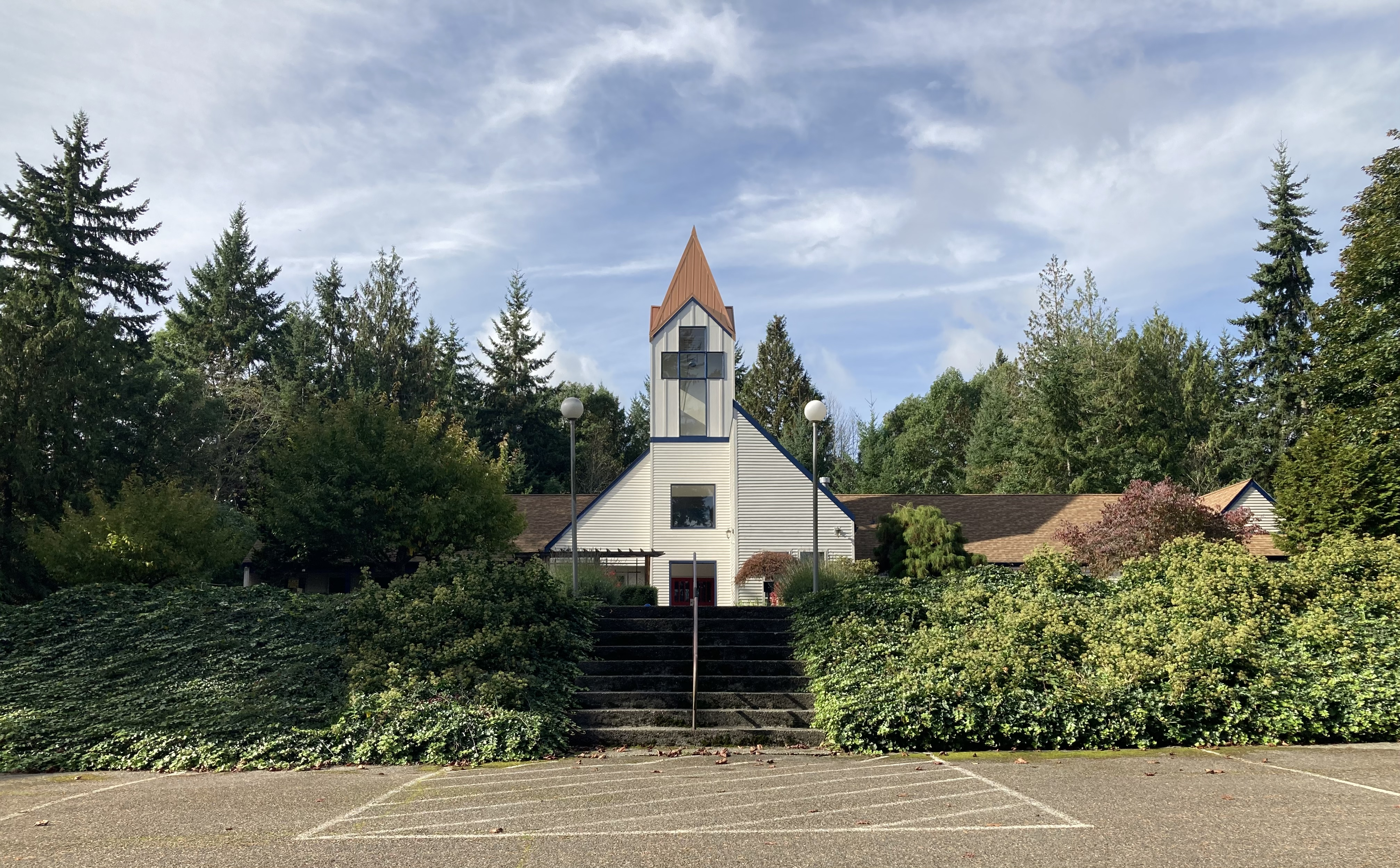
- St. Charles' current building pictured in 2023
- St. Charles Anglican Cathedral
- Location: Bremerton, Washington
- Country: United States
- Denomination: Anglican Church in North America
- Website: stcharlesanglican.com

History
- Founded: 1966
- Dedicated: 2019

Architecture
- Style: Northwest Regional

Administration
- Diocese: Cascadia

Clergy
- Bishop: The Rt. Rev. Jacob Worley
- Rector: The Rev. David Marten

St. Charles Anglican Cathedral is the cathedral of the Anglican Church in North America's Diocese of Cascadia. Founded in Poulsbo, Washington, in 1966, the congregation left the Episcopal Church as part of the Anglican realignment and eventually moved to its current location near Bremerton, Washington, in central Kitsap County. The cathedral's patron is Charles Lwanga, one of the Ugandan martyrs.

== History ==
In 1965, as north Kitsap County began to grow in population due to the completion of the Agate Pass Bridge and ferry connections to downtown Seattle, the Episcopal congregation that had met in historic St. Paul's Church in Port Gamble since 1932 launched a mission congregation in Poulsbo. Land was donated for a new church near S.R. 305, and worship services began in 1966 in portable buildings. The North Kitsap Episcopal Mission shared clergy between the Poulsbo and Port Gamble sites.

A permanent building of modernist design was dedicated in 1978. By the 1980s, the "sending" church in Port Gamble was dwarfed by St. Charles, and the latter began supporting the offering of services at St. Paul's, an arrangement that continued until 2005, when the congregation's lease expired with the owner of St. Paul's.

== Anglican realignment ==
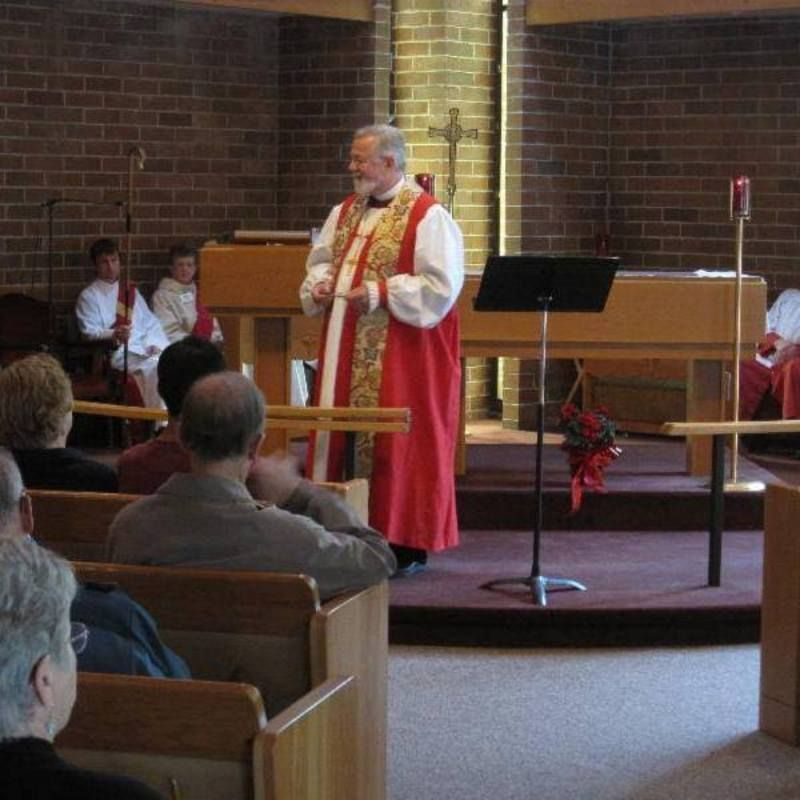
Bishop Kevin Bond Allen presides at St. Charles Anglican Church's final service in its permanent Poulsbo location before the congregation vacated it and returned it to the Episcopal Diocese of Olympia.

St. Charles was known within the Episcopal Diocese of Olympia for its evangelical orientation, and the 2003 consecration of partnered gay bishop Gene Robinson led to a rupture. In October 2004, under the leadership of the Ven. Duncan Clark as rector, the members of St. Charles and another congregation—St. Stephen's in Oak Harbor—voted to disaffiliate from the Episcopal Church and become canonically resident under Bishop Robinson Cavalcanti in the theologically conservative Diocese of Recife in the Anglican Episcopal Church of Brazil. St. Charles in 2009 became a founding member of the Diocese of Cascadia in the newly formed Anglican Church in North America.

St. Charles and St. Stephen's negotiated an agreement with Bishop Vincent Warner to continue using their church buildings until 2014, receiving quitclaim deeds for the properties. However, under Presiding Bishop Katharine Jefferts Schori, who took office in 2006, the Episcopal Church refused to negotiate with congregations desiring affiliation with other Anglican Communion provinces, and upon expiring in 2014 the agreement was not renewed. On June 8, 2014, St. Charles held its final service in the building and relocated to leased property in a nearby office park. The congregation met there for five years while it raised money for a new building.

== Designation as cathedral ==
In December 2018, under the leadership of the Rev. Mike Boone, St. Charles purchased a permanent church building near Silverdale and Bremerton. The building was built in 1981 for Family of God Lutheran Church, an Evangelical Lutheran Church in America congregation that had dissolved itself earlier in 2018.

After St. Charles moved into the new space, Bishop Kevin Bond Allen designated it on March 2, 2019, as the Diocese of Cascadia's cathedral, marking the diocese's tenth anniversary. The diocesan offices are also housed at the church.

Boone died at an unusually young age in 2020 and was succeeded as rector by the Rev. Chris Recinella. In 2021, Allen and Recinella hosted a triannual meeting of the ACNA Executive Committee at St. Charles.
