= All Saints Church (Fort Worth, Texas) =

Anglican church in Texas, US

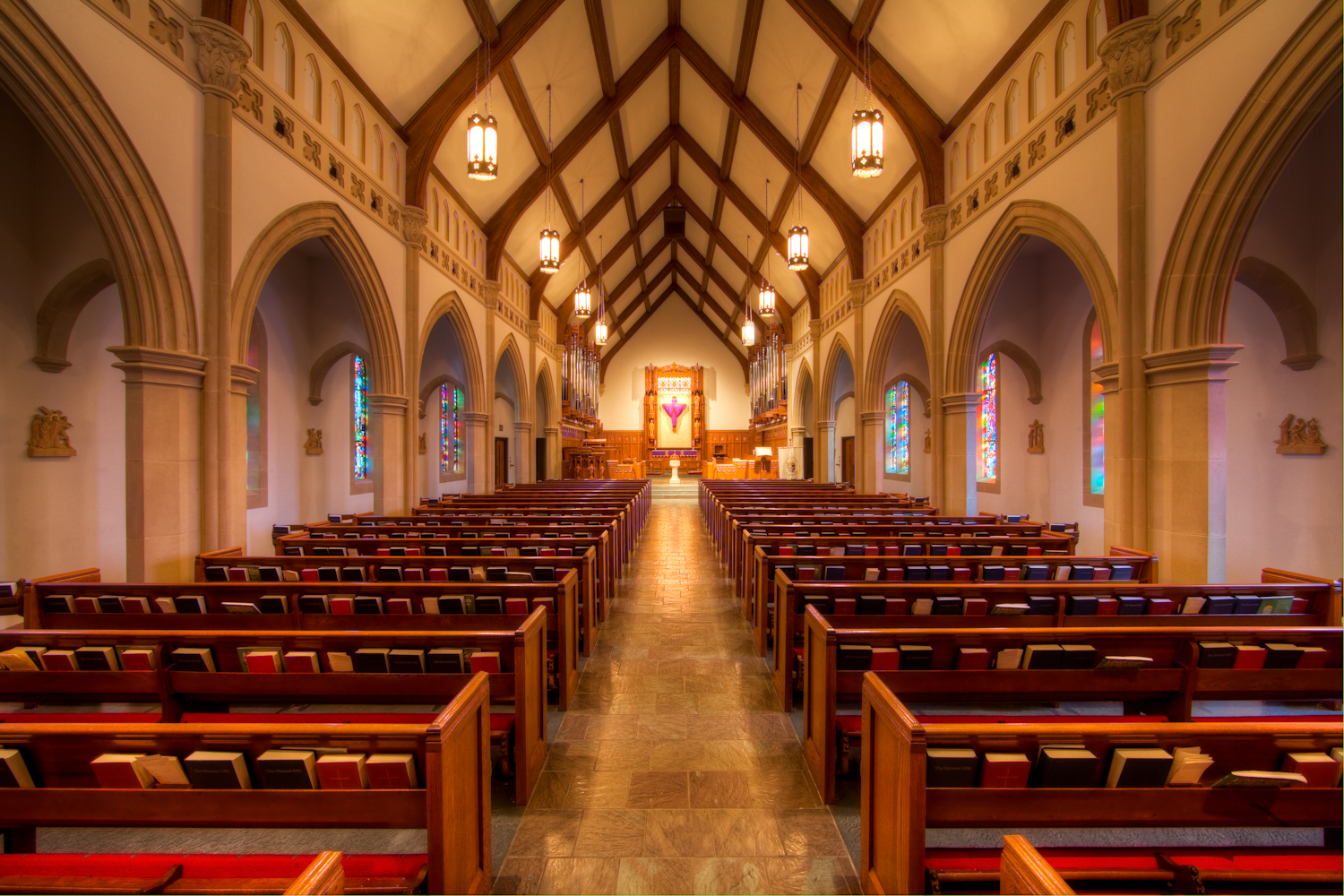
- The nave of All Saints Church looking toward the altar
- All Saints Church
- 32°44′27″N 97°23′43″W
- Country: United States
- Denomination: Anglican Church in North America
- Previous denomination: Episcopal Church
- Website: allsaintscrestline.org

History
- Former name: All Saints Episcopal Church
- Status: 5001 Crestline Road, Fort Worth, Texas, US
- Founded: June 1946
- Dedication: All Saints
- Dedicated: November 1, 1954

Architecture
- Architect: Herman G. Cox
- Architectural type: Church
- Style: Gothic Revival; Tudor Revival
- Years built: 1949–1954
- Construction cost: $354,000

Specifications
- Capacity: 300
- Materials: Limestone

Administration
- Diocese: Fort Worth

Clergy
- Rector: The Rev. Darryl Pigéon

All Saints Church is an Anglican church in Fort Worth, Texas, United States. The congregation is a member of the Anglican Church in North America's Diocese of Fort Worth. The church was founded in 1946 as a mission of the Episcopal Diocese of Dallas, and its Gothic Revival campus on Crestline Road was built between 1949 and 1954. For a short time in the 1980s and 1990s, this church was the cathedral of the Episcopal Diocese of Fort Worth, but it gave up its cathedral status amid disagreement about the direction of the diocese at the time. When the Diocese of Fort Worth separated from the Episcopal Church during the Anglican realignment in the late 2000s (2007–2008), the congregation was the largest to remain in the Episcopal Church in North Texas. The building became the subject of litigation. In 2021, appeals ended with a determination that the separated diocese was the rightful owner of the building, and the existing congregation vacated the space—with the building temporarily left stripped of its furnishings and liturgical elements—paving the way for a replacement congregation to begin services.

== History ==
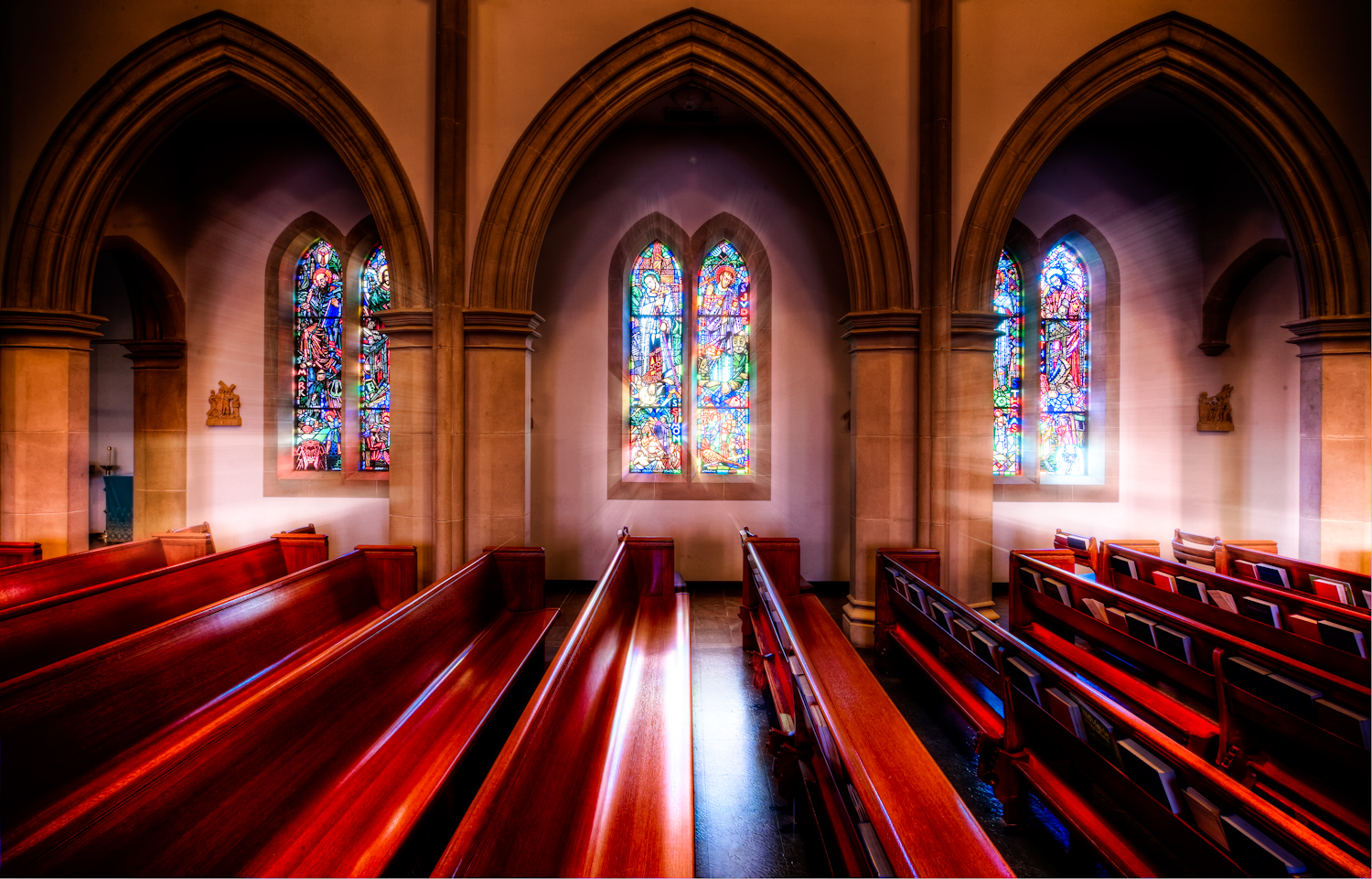
Light filters through lancet windows in the nave of All Saints Church.

All Saints began as a mission congregation of the Diocese of Dallas, holding services at Fort Worth's Ridglea Presbyterian Church beginning in June 1946, later moving to the Westover Hills Town Hall. The church became an official parish of the diocese in 1948 and purchased land on the west side for a permanent building. A parish hall was completed in 1949, and a rectory and undercroft for the main church were completed in 1951. The church's 300-seat sanctuary was dedicated on All Saints' Day, 1954.

In 1986, following the 1983 formation of the Diocese of Fort Worth out of the Diocese of Dallas, All Saints was designated as the cathedral of the new diocese. As a result of conflict over the theological direction of the diocese—Bishop Clarence C. Pope was a leader of the Episcopal Synod of America (now Forward in Faith–America), which opposed the ordination of women to the priesthood, while the dean and vestry of All Saints did not agree with Pope's emphasis on the issue—the church asked Pope to designate a different cathedral.

These disagreements grew by the 2000s, and as part of the broader Anglican realignment movement, the Episcopal Diocese of Fort Worth voted in 2008 to disaffiliate from the Episcopal Church and eventually became a founding member of the Anglican Church in North America (ACNA). A group of congregations, including All Saints, along with the national Episcopal Church, disputed the validity of the decision and filed suit in Texas courts in 2009 to claim ownership of all property of parishes in the Episcopal Diocese of Fort Worth, valued at over $100 million. In 2015, a judge ruled that the ACNA-affiliated diocese was the rightful owner of the contested real and personal property.

The Episcopal Church parties appealed the ruling; it was affirmed by the Supreme Court of Texas in 2020, and the U.S. Supreme Court declined to hear an appeal in February 2021, ending all appeals. All Saints Episcopal Church—at the time the largest church in the Episcopalian rump diocese—vacated the building in the spring of 2021. A brief filed in further court proceedings over personal property showed that in moving out of All Saints, the church's high altar had been partially disassembled, with a large crucifix and four statues of saints removed. Contents were also removed from the parish hall, parlor, classrooms, nurseries and offices. As of June 2021, computers, financial records and a music library had not been returned. The Episcopal entities' claims to personal property were rejected by a judge in September of that year.

The Episcopal congregants moved to the chapel of All Saints' Episcopal School under the name "All Saints Episcopal Church", and the ACNA diocese began holding services in the All Saints building. The transfer of property was described as "mirror[ing] other jurisdictions in which Anglicans were required to vacate properties awarded by courts to the Episcopal Church."

All Saints Episcopal Church declared bankruptcy in October 2021. In 2025, the Episcopal congregation announced that it had raised $11 million to buy a former United Methodist church as its permanent building.

== Architecture ==
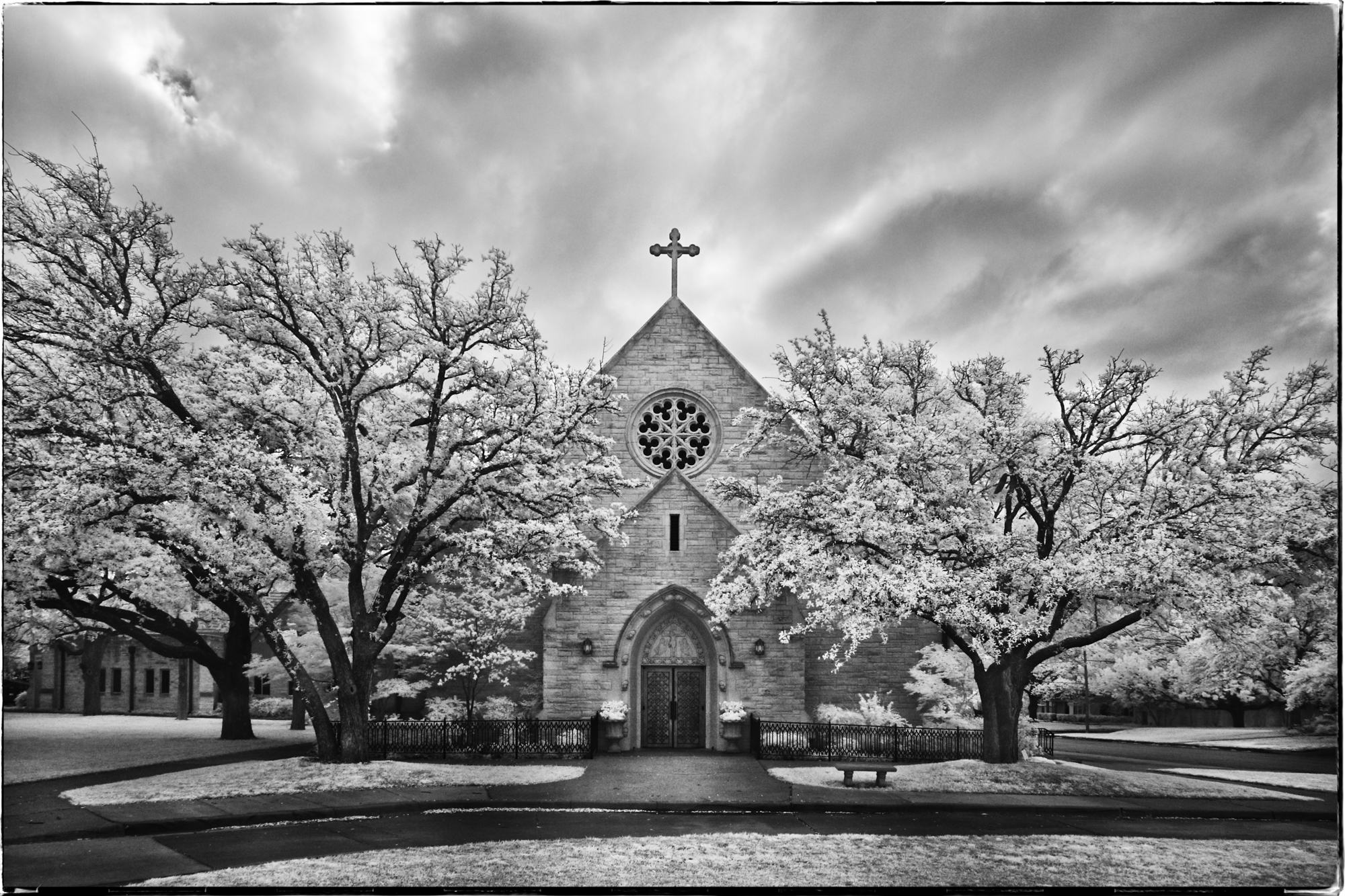
All Saints' exterior with rose window photographed in 2014

The 1949 part of the church, later used as the parish hall, was designed in a Tudor Revival style with a limestone façade and half-timbered gables. The second phase, completed in 1954, saw the sanctuary completed. The Gothic Revival sanctuary is laid out on an east-west axis with a rose window over the entrance facing Crestline Road to the west. The nave seats 300, while a chapel attached to the parish hall seats 40.

== School ==
In 1951, the church founded a parochial school in the undercroft with nursery school and kindergarten, adding grades with subsequent years. Originally known as All Saints'–Tuller School, the school grew into a college preparatory school known as All Saints' Episcopal School. As of 2021, it was separately incorporated, located on its own 147-acre (59 ha) campus and no longer affiliated with All Saints Church on Crestline.
