= Kevin Bond Allen =

American Anglican Bishop (born 1954)

The Right Reverend Kevin Bond Allen
- Bishop of Cascadia
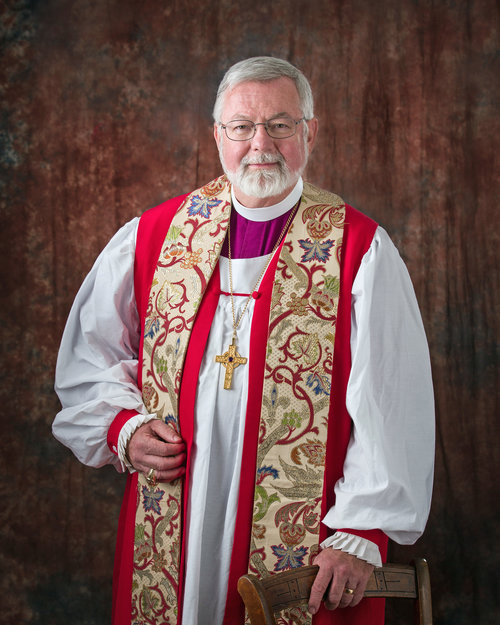
- Church: Anglican Church in North America
- Diocese: Cascadia
- In office: 2011–2024
- Predecessor: Richard Boyce (as vicar general)
- Successor: Jacob Worley

Orders
- Ordination: 1988
- Consecration: September 30, 2011 by Robert Duncan

Personal details
- Born: 1954 (age 70–71) Silverdale, Washington

Kevin Bond Allen (born 1954) is an American Anglican bishop. From 2011 to 2024, he was the first bishop of the Diocese of Cascadia in the Anglican Church in North America. Earlier in his career, as an Episcopal priest, he was a key figure in the Anglican realignment in the Pacific Northwest.

== Early life, education, and ministry ==
Allen was born in 1954 and raised in Silverdale, Washington. He graduated from the University of Washington and completed his graduate studies at Seattle University. He served as a youth leader during his college years and, determining a call to ministry in the Episcopal Church, he went on to complete an M.Div. after studies at both General Theological Seminary and Ridley Hall, Cambridge.

Allen served as a lay missioner in a Church of England inner-city London parish serving low-income multi-racial communities. He also served as a missioner in Bangladesh with the United Society for the Propagation of the Gospel. Ordained in the Episcopal Church in 1988, over the next two decades Allen served as vicar of a Cambodian refugee church in Tacoma, an associate rector in Bellevue, as a rector in Puyallup, Washington, and as rector of the historic All Saints' Episcopal Church in Austin, Texas, where he founded and chaired Senior Pastors of University Congregations). In 2002, Allen returned to Washington state as rector of St. Paul's Episcopal Church in Bellingham. St. Paul's was the second-largest parish in the Diocese of Olympia.

== Anglican realignment ==
In late 2007, amid a broader realignment within North American Anglicanism over issues of doctrine and human sexuality, approximately 30 of the 1,400 members of St. Paul's left the church and planted St. Brendan's Anglican Church in Bellingham. In early 2008, Allen stepped down as rector of St. Paul's and became rector of St. Brendan's, telling St. Paul's members that "During the last few years, our (national) Episcopal Church has continued to embrace a wide range of and often conflicting teachings regarding scriptural authority, the divinity of Christ, and affirming other religions at the price of evangelism. . . . Since I do not agree with their direction, my leadership as a rector would become a divisive issue rather than a reconciling blessing in future parish discussions about how we should participate with and support our diocese and national church."

As rector of St. Brendan's, Allen became a leader among a group of disparate Anglican realignment congregations in Washington state, including St. Charles in Poulsbo and St. Stephen's in Oak Harbor, both of which had left the Episcopal Church, as well as Reformed Episcopal congregations and unaffiliated Anglican-tradition churches. In 2009, the group of churches formed the Diocese of Cascadia, under Reformed Episcopal Church Bishop Richard Boyce as vicar general, and the diocese-in-formation was admitted to the newly formed Anglican Church in North America.

== Episcopacy ==
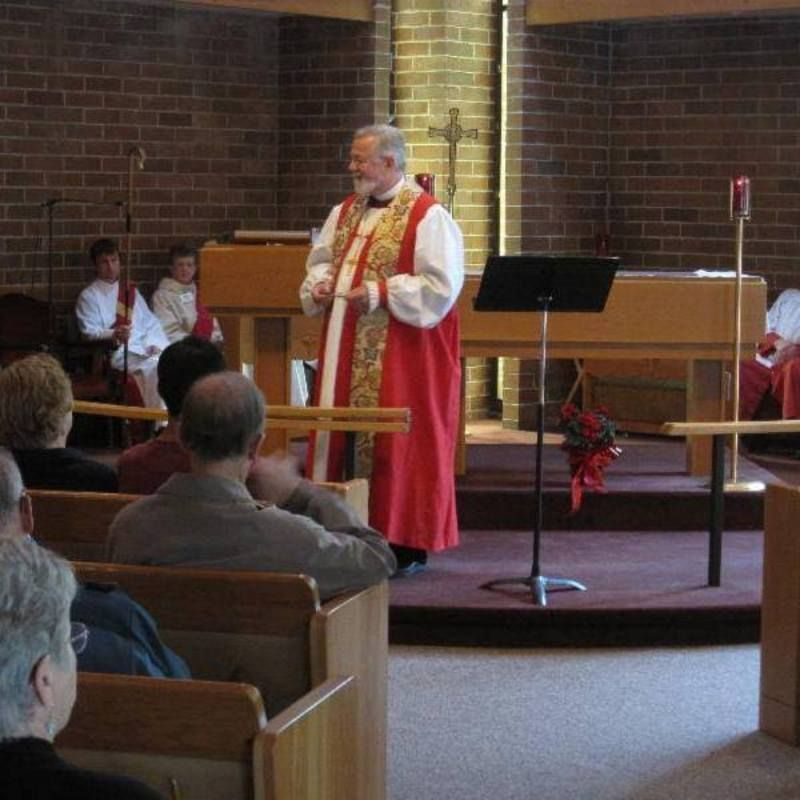
Allen presides over St. Charles Anglican Church's final service at its original Poulsbo location.

In 2011, the diocese was fully recognized in the ACNA and Allen was elected and consecrated as its first diocesan bishop by ACNA Archbishop Robert Duncan. Under his leadership, the diocese of the Diocese of Cascadia began with seven congregations and had grown by 2021 to 26 congregations, church plants and missions across Oregon, Washington, and Alaska.

In the ACNA, Allen serves on the Native American Ministry Task Force, as president of the board of Share Our Ministries Abroad (SOMA-USA), and provincial dean of College of Bishops affairs, in which capacity he is leading the ACNA 2030 task force. He was also a member of the ACNA Task Force on Holy Orders, which assessed the scriptural and theological foundations of the debate over women's ordination in the ACNA.

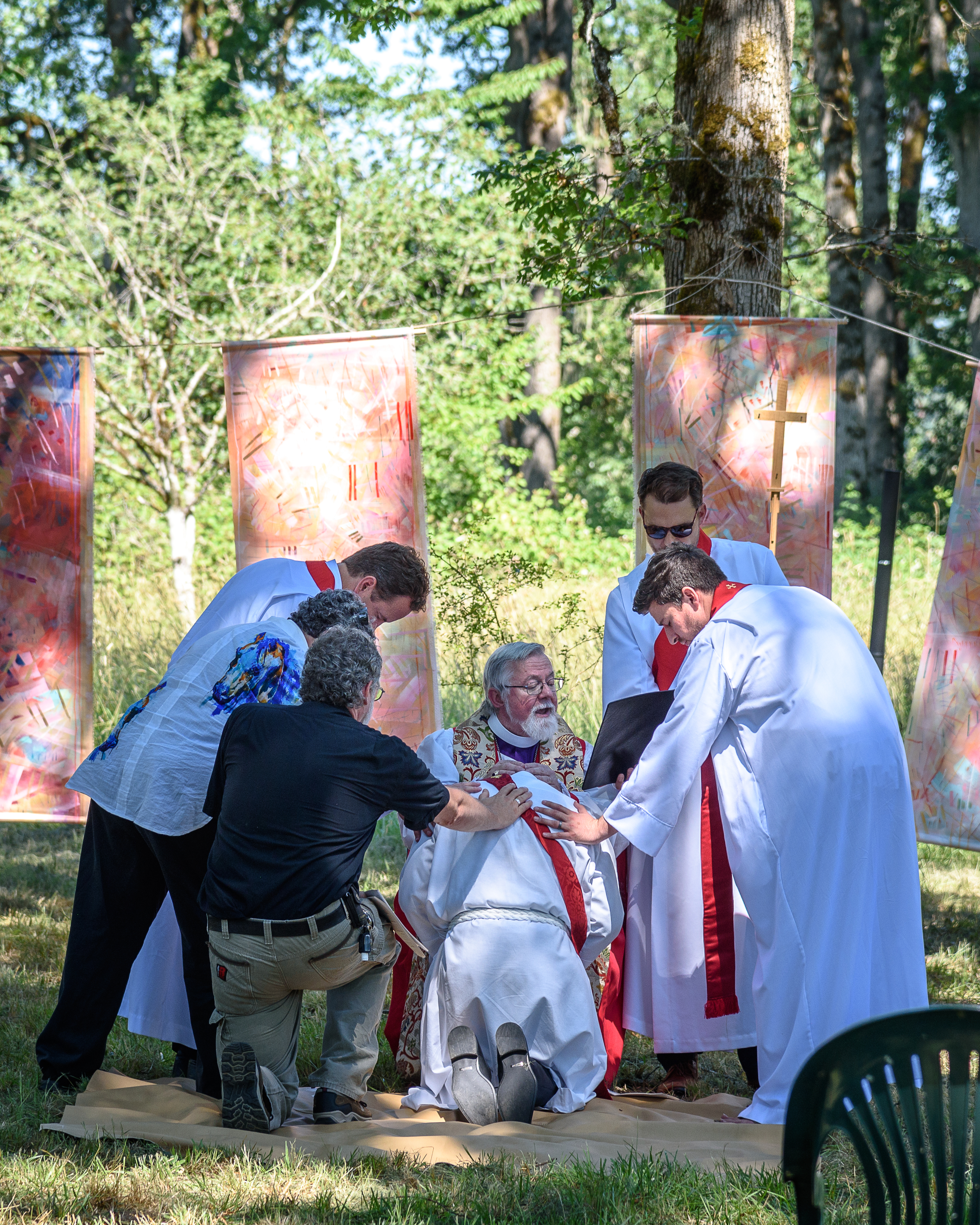
Allen (center) ordains a priest in the Diocese of Churches for the Sake of Others in an outdoor service in Portland, Oregon.

In 2016, Allen joined fellow ACNA bishops Eric Menees, Mark Zimmerman, Keith Andrews, and Todd Hunter to streamline the ordination process in western U.S. ACNA dioceses, with a joint exam and a joint examining board that would allow clergy ordained under the standards to serve in any participating diocese.

In 2019, Allen designated St. Charles Anglican Church's new building in Silverdale as Cascadia's diocesan cathedral. Episcopal offices are also housed at the cathedral. In 2021, Allen hosted a triannual meeting of the ACNA Executive Committee at St. Charles.

In 2022, Allen announced he would retire as bishop. An episcopal election was held in fall 2023, and Jacob Worley was consecrated and seated as Allen's successor in early 2024.

=== Anglican and ecumenical relations ===
As bishop, Allen has served in several roles contributing to Anglican and ecumenical relationships. He was appointed to head the companion relationship between the ACNA and the GAFCON-affiliated Church of the Province of Myanmar. He was the first ACNA bishop invited to attend an OCA All America Council meeting in 2011 and as a result was appointed co-chair of the ecumenical dialogue between the ACNA and the Orthodox Church in America. He also co-led the 2015 meeting in Moscow of ACNA Archbishop Foley Beach and Patriarch Kirill of the Russian Orthodox Church.

== Personal life ==
Allen is married to Stefanie Allen, a former faculty member of the English Department at Tacoma Community College, and later high school teacher and administrator. They have one son (a bi-vocational Anglican priest) and daughter-in-law who serve a parish in the Diocese of Cascadia.

Religious titles
Preceded by Richard Boyce vicar general	I Bishop of Cascadia; 2011–2024	Succeeded by Jacob Worley
