= College of Saints John Fisher & Thomas More =

Catholic college in Fort Worth, Texas, US

Coordinates: 32.70110°N 97.33299°W

- Former names: Saint Thomas More Institute, College of Saint Thomas More
- Motto: Deum Cognoscere Diligere Servire
- Motto in English: "To Know, To Love, and To Serve God"
- Type: Private
- Active: 1981–2014
- Affiliations: Catholic Church
- President: Michael G. King
- Location: Fort Worth, Texas, US
- Campus: Urban, "university district"

The College of Saints John Fisher & Thomas More (also called Fisher More College and formerly known as the College of Saint Thomas More) was a private Catholic liberal arts college that operated from 1981 to 2014 in Fort Worth, Texas.

== Academic degrees ==
The college offered programs leading to the Bachelor of Arts and the Associate of Arts. Initially, the curriculum was a single program in the liberal arts based on the Great Books of the Western tradition. Later, concentrations were added in theology, philosophy, literature, history, classical studies, economics, and finance. The college was accredited by the Southern Association of Colleges and Schools.

== History ==
=== Founding ===
On December 26, 1981, a group of parishioners of St. Patrick Cathedral in Fort Worth founded the Saint Thomas More Institute in order to establish "in Fort Worth a Roman Catholic liberal arts college devoted to teaching and learning within the tradition of Catholic arts and letters". James Patrick, theology professor, and Ronald Muller, former dean of students at the University of Dallas, started an informal program called the "Common Tradition Curriculum" in 1982, with short courses in philosophy, theology, and literature offered under the auspices of the Institute.

=== Expansion and recognition ===
In 1985, the Institute moved into a permanent building on Mérida Street in Fort Worth, near Texas Christian University (TCU). During that year, the Common Tradition Curriculum had about 75 students. As expansion continued, a curriculum for an Associate of Arts degree was developed, and in 1989, the institute was granted authorization by the Texas Higher Education Coordinating Board. During this time, overseas study programs in Oxford and Rome were added. In 1991, the Institute changed its name to The College of Saint Thomas More.

By 1994, the student population had risen to more than sixty, and the college had grown to a campus of four buildings. In that year, the Southern Association of Colleges and Schools (SACS) granted the College of Saint Thomas More accreditation for the associate degree. In addition to its long-running visiting lecturer series (the "Cardinal Newman Lecture"), the college also started to offer seminars for local community leaders. In 1995, co-founder Ronald Muller left for a position at St. Mary's College in Orchard Lake, while James Patrick remained as provost. In 1999, SACS granted the college accreditation for the bachelor's degree.

In 2001, there were 63 students and six instructors. The Cardinal Newman Society endorsed the college in its handbook, The Newman Guide to Choosing a Catholic College (first published in 2007), as an institution selected for its adherence to Catholic teaching and commitment to higher education.

=== Crisis and closing ===
The college's final years were characterized by institutional changes, financial crisis, and church-related controversy. In June 2012, the college changed its name to become The College of Saints John Fisher and Thomas More. A "statement of principles" declared support for Catholic Traditionalism and the Tridentine Mass saying, "We are certain that fidelity to the Usus Antiquior is essential to achieving our mission."

In June 2013, the college sold its properties adjacent to the TCU campus and moved into leased facilities in the former Our Lady of Victory Academy, a five-story structure built in 1909 and on the National Register of Historic Places. After the move, chancellor and board member Taylor Marshall resigned, later saying that the real estate deal had "financially crippled" the college. College president Michael King defended the property sale in a public statement. Marshall also charged that some Traditionalist speakers at college events had publicly denounced the Second Vatican Council and the reformed rite of Mass supported by Popes since 1970. After a meeting between the college president and newly appointed Fort Worth bishop Michael Olson, the bishop withdrew permission for any celebrations of the Tridentine Mass on the college campus.

The student population declined: in September 2013, the college had 42 students enrolled, of whom 25 returned for the Spring 2014 term. A student-aided internet fundraising effort brought in nearly $300,000 to keep college operations going. In March 2014, the college's landlord sued, claiming that the college had not paid rent or property taxes for four months. The two parties settled on an agreement that the college would vacate the property by May 31, 2014. In his statement on the closing, President King said that the college would not be able to continue without permission from the bishop for priests to offer the traditional Latin Mass on campus.

== On-line school ==
Regina Coeli Academy, an online Catholic homeschooling-oriented school founded in 1995 and serving elementary, junior high, and high school students, became affiliated with the college in 2012 and adopted the name Fisher More Academy. In the wake of the college's closing, an independent "Queen of Heaven Academy" was established to maintain the programs formerly offered.

== Notable faculty ==
- Taylor Marshall
