= Clarence C. Pope =

Clarence Cullam Pope (October 26, 1929 – January 8, 2012) was an American Catholic who formerly served as the second Episcopal Bishop of Fort Worth. He was a prominent leader in Anglo-Catholicism in North America. He converted to Roman Catholicism twice, in 1995 and 2007.

== Early life and career ==
Pope was born in Lafayette, Louisiana. He was educated at Centenary College (B.A. 1950) and the University of the South (B.D. 1954). He was ordained deacon on June 29, 1954, and priest on May 9, 1955.

After serving Episcopal parishes in Louisiana, Pope was consecrated Bishop Coadjutor of Fort Worth on January 5, 1985; he became diocesan bishop on January 1, 1986. He was president of the Episcopal Synod of America, now Forward in Faith, from 1989 to 1993. He was a prominent leader in Anglo-Catholicism in North America.

Pope retired as diocesan bishop on December 31, 1994, and was received into the Catholic Church by Cardinal Bernard Law of Boston on February 1, 1995. Pope subsequently returned to Episcopal Church, but was again received into the Catholic Church in 2007.

Anglican Communion titles
Preceded by A. Donald Davies	Bishop of Fort Worth (Episcopalian); 1986–1995	Succeeded by Jack Iker
