= St. Vincent's Cathedral School =

School in Texas, United States of America

Coordinates: 32.831270°N 97.141262°W

St. Vincent's School was a private Anglican school in Bedford, Texas, United States. It was a school of St. Vincent's Cathedral in the Episcopal Diocese of Fort Worth of the Anglican Church in North America and the Anglican Church of the Southern Cone.

In the 2013–2014 school year, the school had 17.5 classroom teachers and served 108 students in prekindergarten through 12th grade.

In 2010 the school rejected a 4-year old for admission because her parents were lesbians.

In Fall of 2011, St. Vincent's implemented an Upper School for high school education.

The former location of St. Vincent's Cathedral School is now used by Gracewood Academy, a private, part-time Christian homeschool.
