= St. Stephen's Episcopal Church (Oak Harbor, Washington) =

Episcopal church on Whidbey Island, Washington

Coordinates: 48.293969°N 122.635958°W

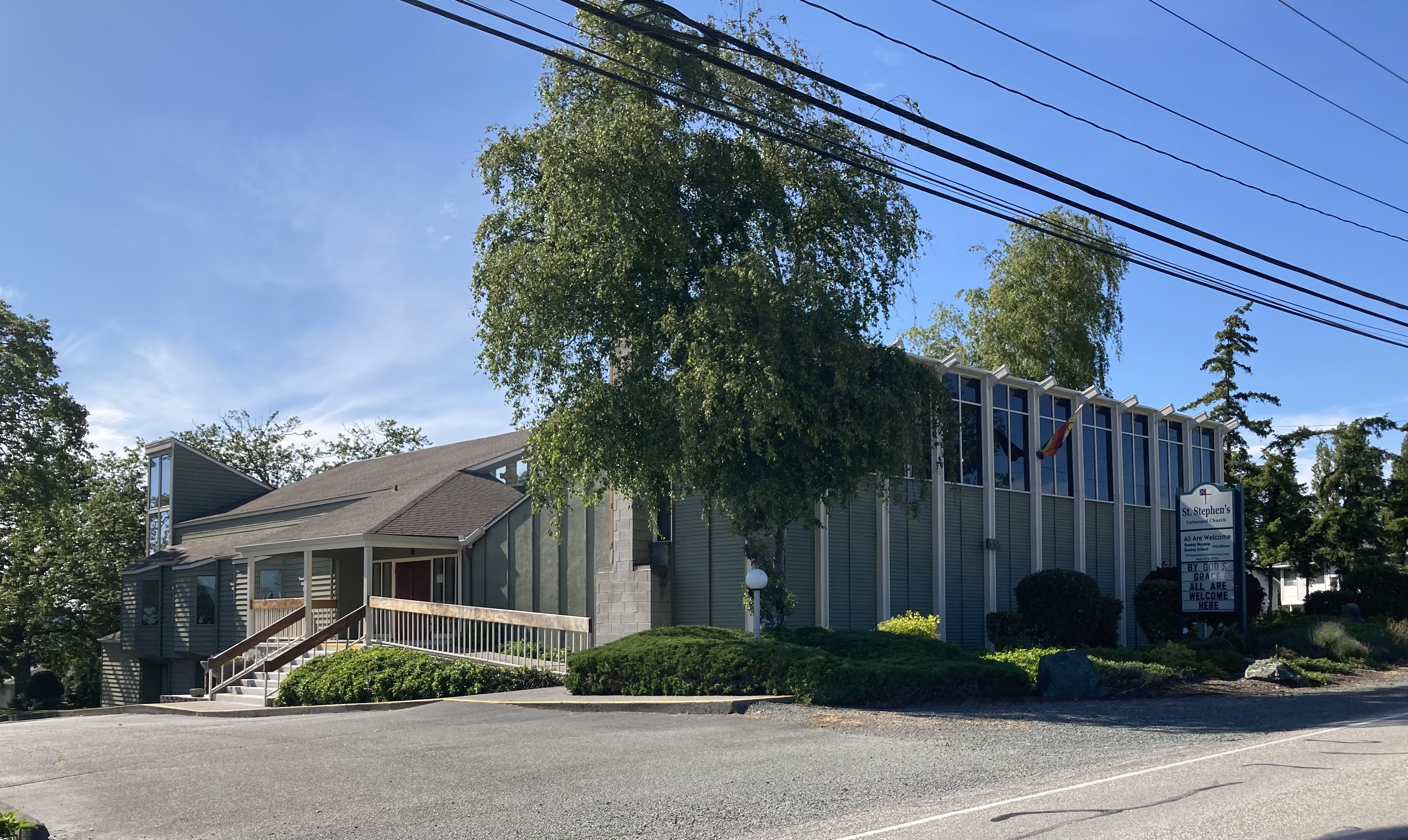
- St. Stephen's sanctuary and parish hall pictured in 2024
- St. Stephen's Episcopal Church
- Location: Oak Harbor, Washington
- Country: United States
- Denomination: Episcopal Church
- Website: www.ststephensofoakharbor.org

History
- Founded: 1952
- Dedicated: 1954 (chapel); 1960 (parish hall); 1982 (sanctuary)

Architecture
- Style: Northwest Regional

Administration
- Diocese: Olympia

Clergy
- Rector: The Rev. Paul Price

St. Stephen's Episcopal Church is an Episcopal congregation in Oak Harbor, Washington. Known for most of its history as a strongly evangelical church within the Diocese of Olympia, the church played a role in the Anglican realignment when the bulk of the church left the Episcopal Church in 2004 and affiliated with the Diocese of Recife in Brazil. After a decade in which the departing Anglicans and a remnant of Episcopalians shared the church property, the departing group moved to a different location under the name Grace by the Sea Anglican Church.

== History ==
St. Stephen's was founded in 1952 by Navy families based at NAS Whidbey Island. It was recognized as a mission of the Diocese of Olympia in 1954, and its first building (now All Saints Chapel) was erected the same year. A second sanctuary (now the parish hall) was completed in 1960, and the present-day sanctuary was completed in 1982. In the 1980s and 1990s, St. Stephen's had an active HIV/AIDS ministry at a time when there was widespread concern about exposure to the virus. During these years, there was growing tension in the congregation over the evangelical beliefs of the clergy and most of the congregants and the theological direction of the Episcopal Church.

=== Role in Anglican realignment ===
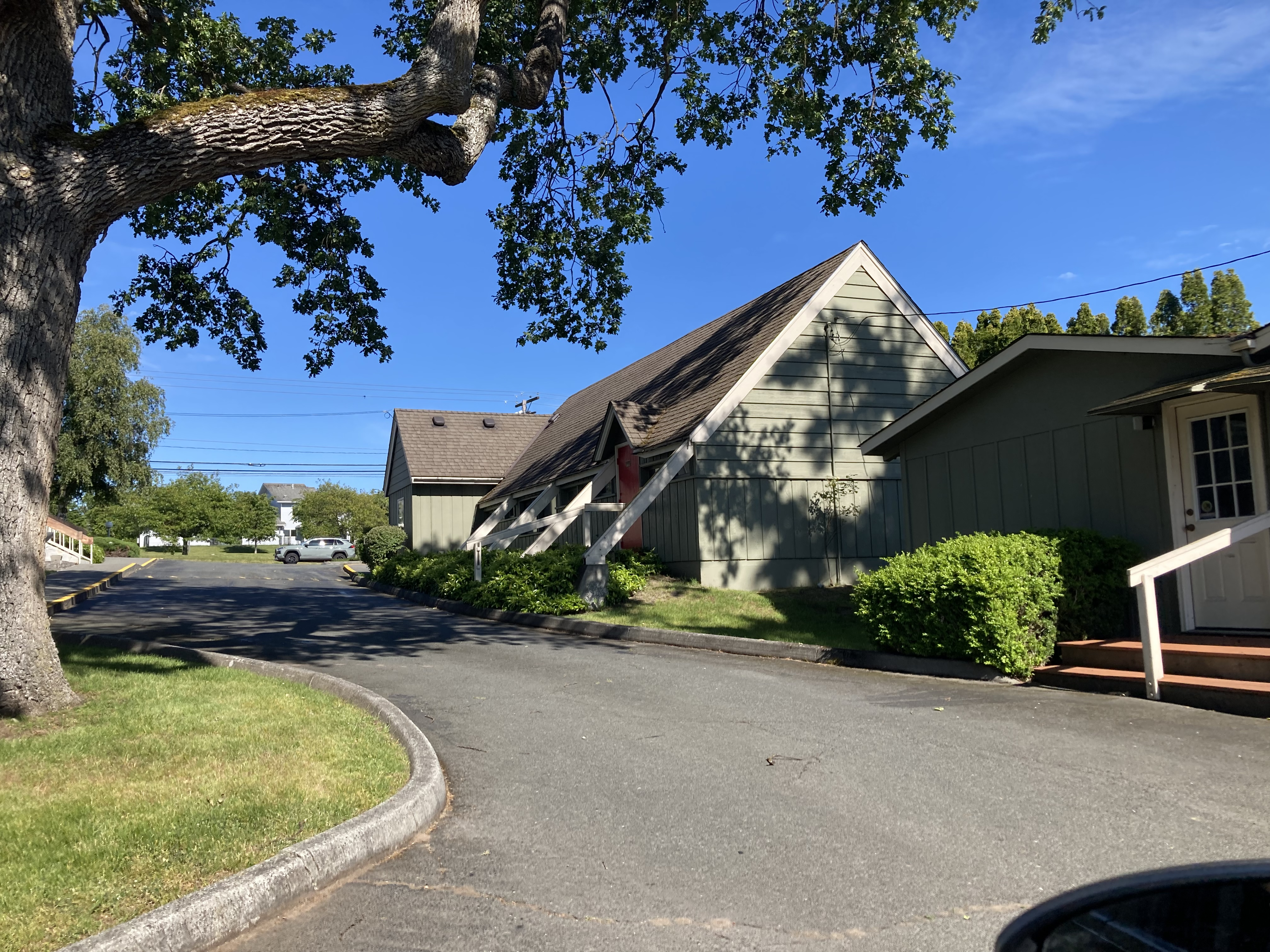
All Saints Chapel, the original St. Stephen's building where the continuing Episcopal church met from 2006 to 2014.

In October 2004, St. Stephen's and St. Charles Episcopal Church in Poulsbo, Washington, became the first two congregations to disassociate from the Episcopal Church following the 2003 election and consecration of Gene Robinson as the first openly gay bishop in the Anglican Communion. The members of both churches voted to disaffiliate and seek oversight from the Anglican bishop of Recife, Robinson Cavalcanti. The congregations attributed the decision to "the Episcopal Church [straying] too far from biblical authority and church teachings," according to the Seattle Times. Initially pursuing reconciliation, then-Olympia Bishop Vincent Warner pushed for reconciliation. In December 2006, Warner and the diocese signed a seven-year agreement—modeled on a biblical jubilee—with St. Stephen's and St. Charles that allowed the breakaway congregations to use their buildings. A small remnant of Episcopalians in Oak Harbor numbering about a dozen continued to worship under the name "St. Stephen's Episcopal Church," using the 1954 chapel building on the parish grounds.

By June 2014, when the agreement expired, the Episcopal Church had successfully retained property from departing congregations in almost all court decisions. Upon the expiration of the agreement, St. Charles Anglican Church and the then-renamed Grace by the Sea in Oak Harbor—both of them at that point founding members of the Diocese of Cascadia in the Anglican Church in North America—moved to different facilities. Grace by the Sea purchased a former YMCA building in downtown Oak Harbor as its church home.

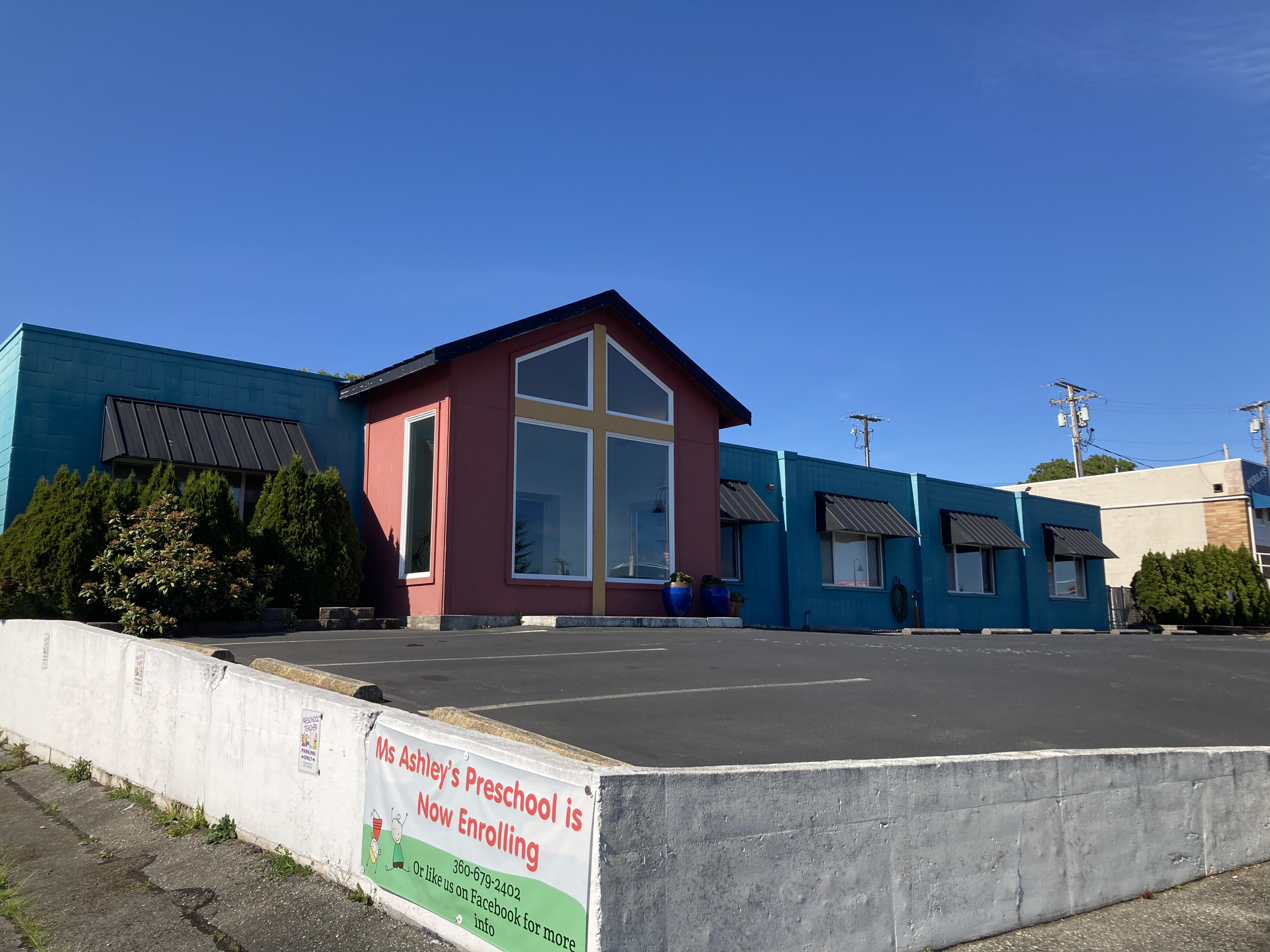
Grace by the Sea's building in downtown October

During the realignment, St. Stephen's decision to leave the Episcopal Church was prominently featured in Anglican Communion Network communication materials making the case for other congregations and dioceses to disaffiliate from the Episcopal Church.

== Architecture ==
The church is designed in the Northwest Regional style. In 2015, St. Stephen's installed a new stained glass window above the altar designed by a parishioner and local artist.

== See also ==
- Anglican realignment
