= St. Aidan's Anglican Church (Spokane, Washington) =

Anglican church in Spokane, Washington, United States

- formerly First German Baptist Church
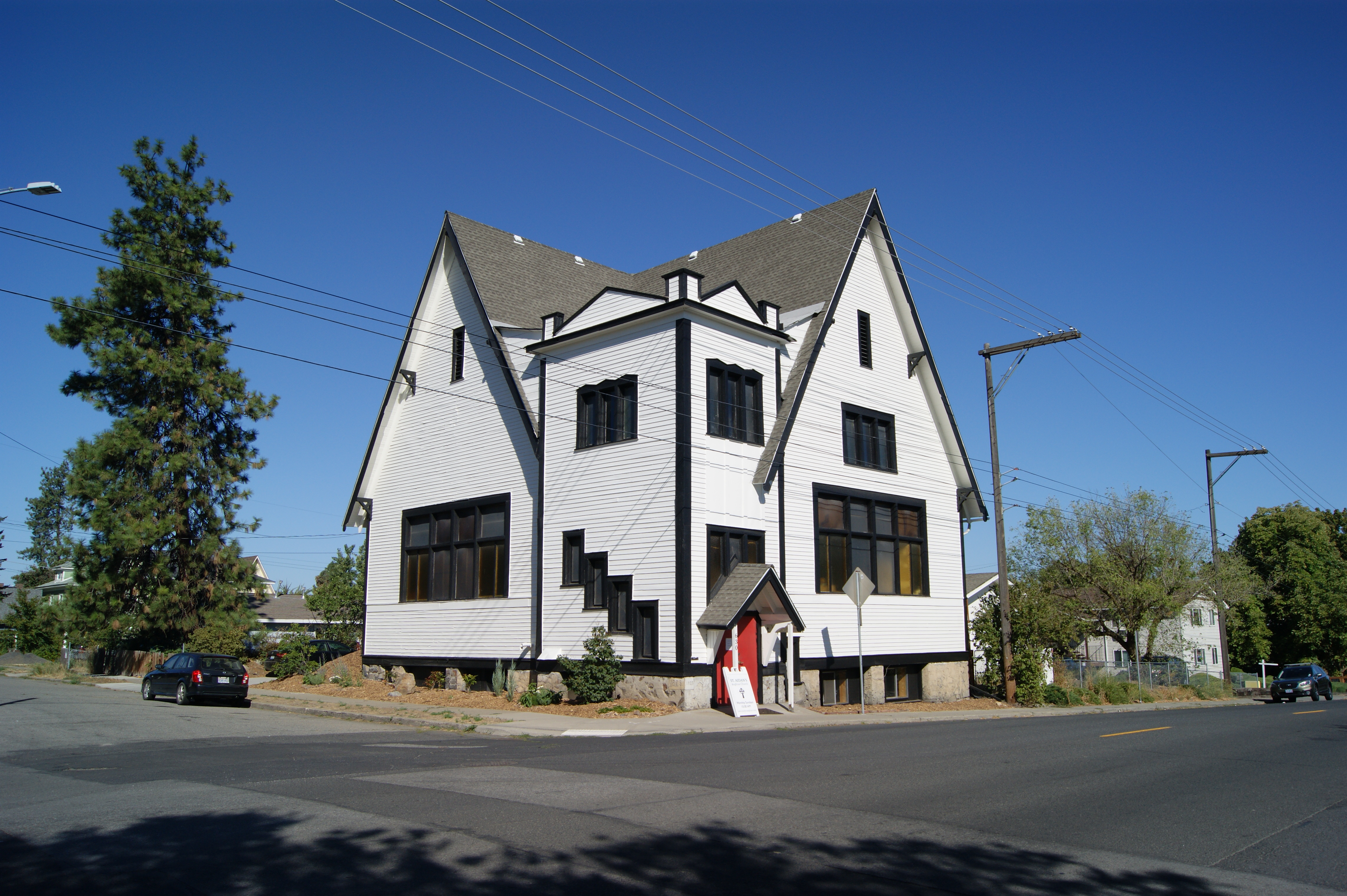
- St. Aidan's Anglican Church in April of 2023
- St. Aidan's Anglican Church
- 47°39′00″N 117°23′43″W
- Location: Spokane, Washington
- Country: United States
- Denomination: Anglican Church in North America
- Website: staidansanglican.com

Architecture
- Style: Carpenter Gothic
- Years built: 1909

Administration
- Diocese: Cascadia

Clergy
- Pastor: The Rev. Carter Smith-Stepper

St. Aidan's Anglican Church is a historic church building in the East Central neighborhood of Spokane, Washington. Built in 1909 as the First German Baptist Church, the building has changed hands several times and is currently a parish of the Diocese of Cascadia in the Anglican Church in North America.

== History of the building ==
The First German Baptist Church was founded by the Rev. F. J. Reichle, who arrived in Spokane in 1904 as a missionary of the General Conference of German Baptist Churches in North America. He organized the church in 1906 and became its first minister. The next year, the congregation acquired a lot at Hartson Avenue and Arthur Street and built a wooden church there in 1909. (Reichle left the church in 1911 under controversy after "romantic developments" with a maid 17 years his junior. The pair married a year later in Oregon.)

An addition to the front of the church was completed in the 1920s. The church continued to offer services in both English and German until the 1940s, during which decade the church was renamed Arthur Street Baptist Church, a member of the North American Baptist Conference that succeeded the German Baptist group. This congregation renamed itself after 1953 and moved to a new location. The original building at Hartson and Arthur became the home of St. Matthew's Baptist Church, a prominent African-American church in Spokane. The church was used as a meeting location for the civil rights movement in Spokane, and the local NAACP chapter frequently met at the church from the 1950s onward.

By 2006, however, St. Matthew's congregation had dwindled and the building had fallen into disrepair. St. Matthew's relocated to a vacant but newer church building. After several years of vacancy, the building was sold to the Anglican Diocese of Cascadia to be used for a church plant called St. Aidan's Anglican Church. The church planter and his wife are restoring the building while the church uses it for worship.

== Architecture ==
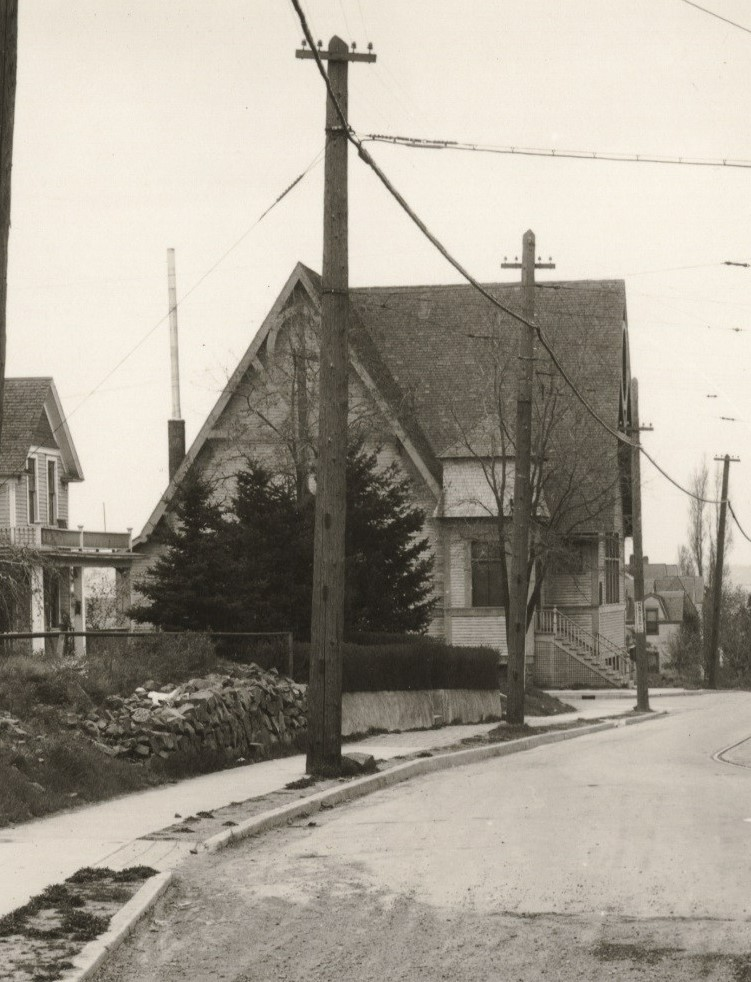
The church in 1926

The church was originally a two-story, cross-gabled structure with wood siding and a stone foundation. Its steeply pitched roofs and corner tower exemplified Carpenter Gothic architecture. Decorative trusswork originally filled in the gable ends but were removed in the 1928 addition. The removal of the trusswork left the building austere and relatively unornamented, except for details on bargeboards and decorative eave brackets. The 1928 addition resulted in a substantial change to the church's appearance, moving the main entrance to the eastern (Arthur Street) side and adding a tower with a pyramidal roof on the southeast corner.

The church's interior features an open foyer on the east side of the building and a sanctuary that occupies the rest of the floor. An immersion baptistry is located under removable floorboards behind the pulpit on the west wall of the church. A drop ceiling added later obscures the vaulting in the sanctuary.
