= Richard Boyce (bishop) =

American Anglican bishop (1928–2020)

The Right Reverend Richard John Boyce
- Former Bishop, Diocese of the West, Reformed Episcopal Church
- Church: Anglican
- In office: 1986–2011
- Other post(s): Vicar General, Diocese of Cascadia

Orders
- Consecration: June 26, 1986 by Bishop James Parker Dees

Personal details
- Born: November 29, 1928
- Died: April 20, 2020

Richard John Boyce (29 November 1928 – April 20, 2020) was an American Anglican bishop. He served in the Anglican Church in North America and the Reformed Episcopal Church.

He was consecrated as a bishop of the Orthodox Anglican Church, a Continuing Anglican denomination by James Parker Dees in 1986. He served as ordinary of the Diocese of the West in the Anglican Province of America until 2008, when he led most of the diocese into the Reformed Episcopal Church. He joined the Anglican Church in North America, when the Reformed Episcopal Church was one of their founding members in 2009. Boyce also served as vicar general of the Diocese of Cascadia during its formation, from 2009 to 2011. He retired from diocesan ministry in both jurisdictions in 2011. He died on April 20, 2020, aged 91 years old. He was the oldest bishop of his denomination.

== Notes ==
Religious titles
Preceded by Diocese created	Vicar General of the Diocese of Cascadia; 2009–2011	Succeeded by Kevin Bond Allen (first bishop)
