= Diocese of Cascadia =

Location
- Ecclesiastical province: Anglican Church in North America

Statistics
- Parishes: 27 (2025)
- Members: 1,350 (2025)

Information
- Rite: Anglican
- Cathedral: St. Charles Anglican Cathedral, Bremerton, WA

Current leadership
- Bishop: Jacob Worley

Website
- Diocese of Cascadia Official Website

The Diocese of Cascadia is a founding diocese of the Anglican Church in North America (ACNA), created in June 2009. It encompasses 25 congregations. The name Cascadia was chosen because the Cascade Range is a prominent geographical feature of the region.

The diocese encompasses the states of Washington, Oregon, and Alaska. The state with most congregations is Washington, with 17, followed by Oregon, with 5, and Alaska, with one. The main church was St. Brendan's Anglican Church in Bellingham, Washington, until the move of St. Charles Anglican Church to Bremerton, Washington, which was consecrated as the diocesan cathedral on 2 March 2019.

== History ==
The new diocese was formed by eight congregations, St. Barnabas (Shoreline), St. Paul's (Seattle), St. Brendan's (Bellingham), St. Charles (Poulsbo), St. Stephen's (Oak Harbor), St. Ursula's (Sultan), and Trinity (Mt. Vernon), with a new church, Resurrection, being started at Fircrest, near Tacoma in Western Washington. The Diocese of Cascadia's first Synod took place on March 7, 2009, in St. Barnabas Anglican Church. On the same occasion, Richard Boyce, a bishop of the Reformed Episcopal Church, was elected as their first Vicar General.

Bishop Boyce stated that "We are committing to unite as congregations whose dynamic worship and discipleship in the Word, in prayer and service nurtures faithful Christians who can reach out to others who are spiritually starving". Boyce noted that the formation of the new diocese will allow congregations to still retain membership with existing jurisdictions during this period. Fr. Kevin Bond Allen, rector of St. Brendan's, was elected president of the Diocesan Council. He stated that "We are not called to belong to a new organization or institution, but to be part of a great mission empowered by the Holy Spirit to make disciples of all people. Our clergy are now collegial pastors of our Lord Jesus Christ, who can pray for, care for and support one another in our ministry together. Our lay members can now share their ministries with our brothers and sisters throughout the Pacific Northwest and know they will always have a worship home away from home in their travels."

Kevin Allen was consecrated the first bishop of the Diocese of Cascadia by Robert Duncan (as archbishop of the ACNA) on September 30, 2011, in Seattle, Washington.

== Bishops ==
1. Kevin Bond Allen (2011–2024)
2. Jacob Worley (2024–present)

== Parishes ==
In 2025, the diocese had 27 congregations (up 8% from 2022) with 1,350 members (up 4% from 2022) and an average Sunday attendance of 1,322 (up 53% from 2022). Notable parishes in the diocese include:

Church	Image	City	Year founded	Year completed	Notes
St. Charles Anglican Cathedral		Bremerton, Washington	1966	1981	Diocesan cathedral
Grace by the Sea Anglican Church		Oak Harbor, Washington	2004		
Holy Trinity Church		Edmonds, Washington	2014		Largest church in the diocese
St. Aidan's Anglican Church		Spokane, Washington	2021	1909	
