= All Saints' Episcopal School (Fort Worth, Texas) =

American preparatory school

Location
- 9700 Saints Circle Fort Worth, Texas 76108
- Coordinates: 32°43′52″N 97°29′33″W

Information
- Founded: 1951
- Head of school: Wallace Worden
- Grades: 3 years old to Grade 12
- Enrollment: 1,264
- Campus size: 147 acres
- Colors: Navy, White
- Athletics conference: Texas Association of Private and Parochial Schools (TAPPS)
- Sports: Football, Field Hockey, Volleyball, Cheerleading, Cross Country, Basketball, Soccer, Swimming, Wrestling, Baseball, Softball, Golf, Lacrosse, Tennis, Track and Field
- Mascot: Saints

All Saints' Episcopal School, founded in 1951, is a private Christian school in Fort Worth, Texas. It is a college preparatory school from early childhood to grade 12.

As of 2025, the school sits on an 147-acre campus. As of 2025, the school has over 1,264 students.

All Saints' Episcopal School is a member of the Texas Association of Private and Parochial Schools.

== Notable alumni ==
- Sloan Struble, founder and member of indie pop project Dayglow (Class of 2018)

== See also ==
- All Saints Church (Fort Worth, Texas)
