= St. Andrew's Anglican Church (Fort Worth, Texas) =

Historic Anglican church in Fort Worth, Texas, United States

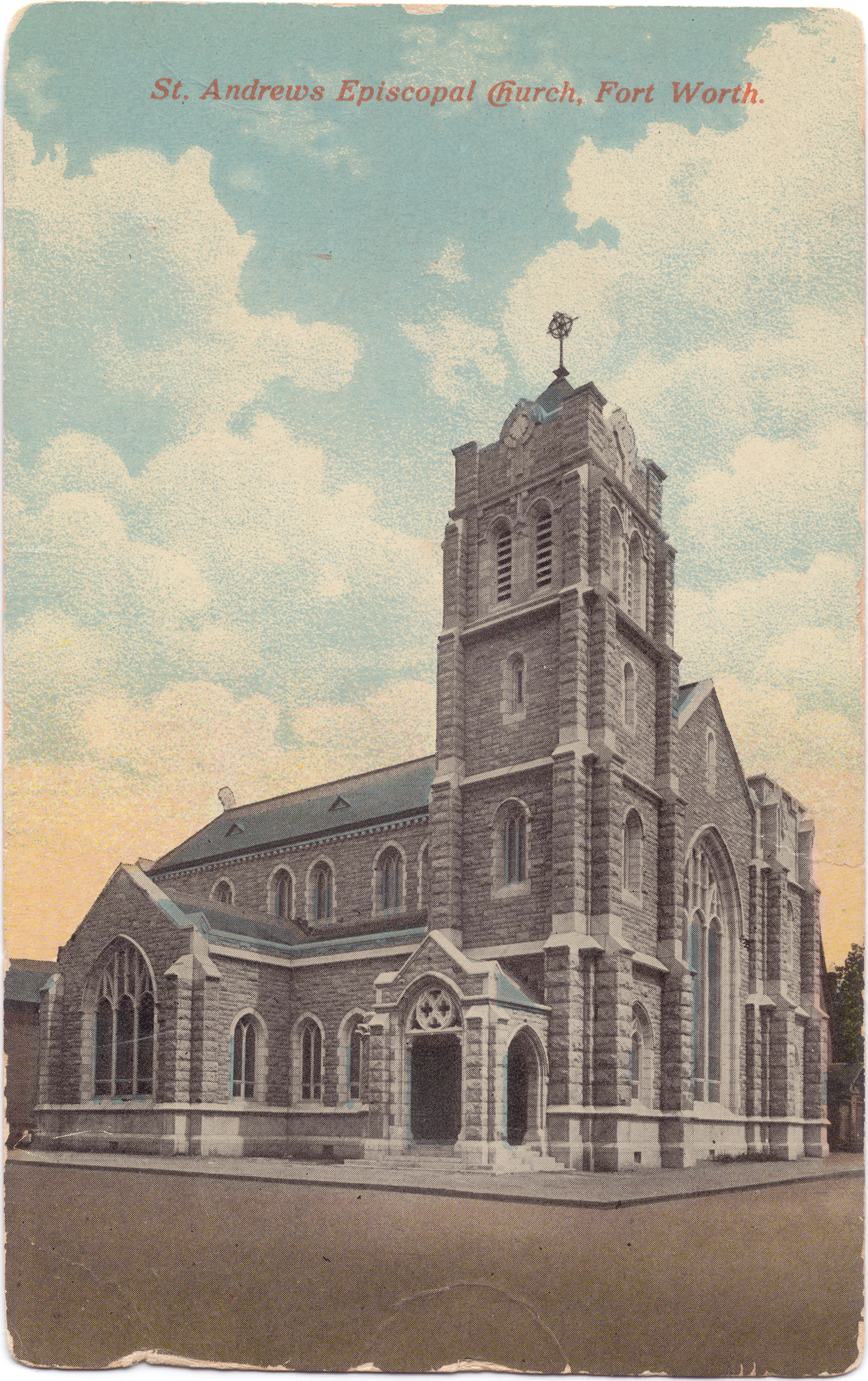
- St. Andrew's Anglican Church
- 32.7499°N 97.3328°W
- Location: Fort Worth, Texas
- Country: United States
- Denomination: Anglican Church in North America
- Website: www.st-andrew.com

History
- Founded: 1875
- Founder: Alexander Charles Garrett
- Dedicated: 1912

Architecture
- Architect: Sanguinet & Staats
- Style: Gothic Revival
- Years built: 1909–1912

Administration
- Diocese: Fort Worth

Clergy
- Rector: The Rev. Brent Christian
- Priest: The Rev. John Kalimi

St. Andrew's Anglican Church is a parish of the Episcopal Diocese of Fort Worth in the Anglican Church in North America. Established as a mission church in 1875, it is the oldest continuous Episcopal/Anglican presence in Fort Worth. In the late 20th and early 21st centuries, it played a role in the Anglican realignment in North America.

== History ==
While Bishop Alexander Gregg held the first Episcopal church service on record in Fort Worth in 1860, no parish was established until 1875. Alexander Charles Garrett, the Episcopal Church's missionary bishop of northern Texas, visited his new missionary district and organized the mission under the Rev. Edwin Wickens. Garrett's first services were held in the Tarrant County courthouse on March 17, 1875. Garrett raised funds for the Texas missions from northeastern Episcopalians; a Connecticut clergyman who heard Garrett's pitch during a train ride agreed to commit $500 to the Fort Worth congregation and asked that it be named for Andrew the Apostle. The cornerstone for St. Andrew's Episcopal Church was laid in 1877, and the church gained parish status in 1878.

The church's current Perpendicular Gothic Revival building was designed by the firm of Sanguinet & Staats. Ground was broken in 1909 and construction continued until the dedication on Rogation Sunday, May 12, 1912. A marble altar and reredos were installed in 1931 as a memorial to the Rev. Bartow B. Ramage, who was rector from 1897 to 1916 and presided over the construction. The church retired its debt in 1939 and built a parish house, designed by Preston M. Geren Jr., a St. Andrew's parishioner and vestryman, in 1949. Geren also designed a 1983 addition.

In 1983, St. Andrew's moved from the Diocese of Dallas to the newly formed Episcopal Diocese of Fort Worth, which became a hub for theological conservatism in the Episcopal Church. St. Andrew's itself became a center for activity in those resisting liberal theology and practice in the Episcopal Church, including same-sex blessings and the ordination of gay men and women. In September 1997, St. Andrew's rector Jeffrey N. Steenson—a future bishop of the Rio Grande who later became the first ordinary of the Chair of St. Peter—joined a group of 26 conservative or traditionalist Episcopal priests in signing what became called the "First Promise" statement. The statement declared the authority of the Episcopal Church and its General Convention to be "fundamentally impaired" because they no longer upheld the "truth of the gospel." The statement's signers also stated their intention to be aligned with Anglican Communion members whose theological principles aligned with the First Promise statement.

In 2008, St. Andrew's joined its diocese in disaffiliating from the Episcopal Church and claiming oversight from the Anglican Church of the Southern Cone. The congregation and diocese later became founding members of the Anglican Church in North America. From 2018 to 2023, St. Andrew's called future bishop of Cascadia Jacob Worley as rector.

== Architecture ==
St. Andrew's Gothic Revival building has been described as "traditional ecclesiastical design of high quality" with "an air reminiscent of an English medieval parish church." The building was built of gray dolomite quarried in Carthage, Missouri. It features a cruciform layout with the altar at the east end and side aisles to the north and south of the nave. Two towers of differing heights are located on the northwest and southwest corners of the church.

Stained glass windows in the church were made by Jacoby Art Glass of St. Louis, with the exception of the rose window in the east end, which was made in England and depicts Jesus calling Andrew and Peter as disciples. A wooden rood screen hand-carved in Italy from Austrian oak separates the chancel from the nave. According to Historic Fort Worth, "Because of its architectural quality and integrity, and its place in the religious history of Fort Worth, St. Andrew’s Episcopal Church appears to be eligible for the National Register."

== Churchmanship ==
While most congregations in the Diocese of Fort Worth adhere to Anglo-Catholic practice, St. Andrew's has a low-church worship tradition. St. Andrew's worships using the 1928 U.S. Book of Common Prayer.
