= Anglican Mission in Canada =

Religious group in North America

Logo of the Anglican Coalition in Canada.

In the Christian religion, the Anglican Coalition in Canada (ACiC) is a Canadian Anglican group that is part of the Anglican Mission in the Americas.

As of 2026 Silas Ng is the bishop of the ACiC and Peter Klenner is the Network Leader. Many of the congregations came from the Diocese of New Westminster, while others are located in Vancouver Island, Alberta, Saskatchewan and Ontario. The group was formed a month after the New Westminster synod voted to allow the blessing of same sex unions, in July 2002.

The ACiC was founded as the Anglican Communion in Canada. However, in 2005, Corporations Canada asked ACiC to change its name since the Anglican Church of Canada is the sole representative of the Anglican Communion in Canada.

== See also ==
- Anglican Communion Network
- Anglican Essentials Canada
- Anglican Diocese of Canada
