= Jack Iker =

American Anglican bishop (1949–2024)

The Right Reverend Jack Iker SSC
- Bishop of Fort Worth
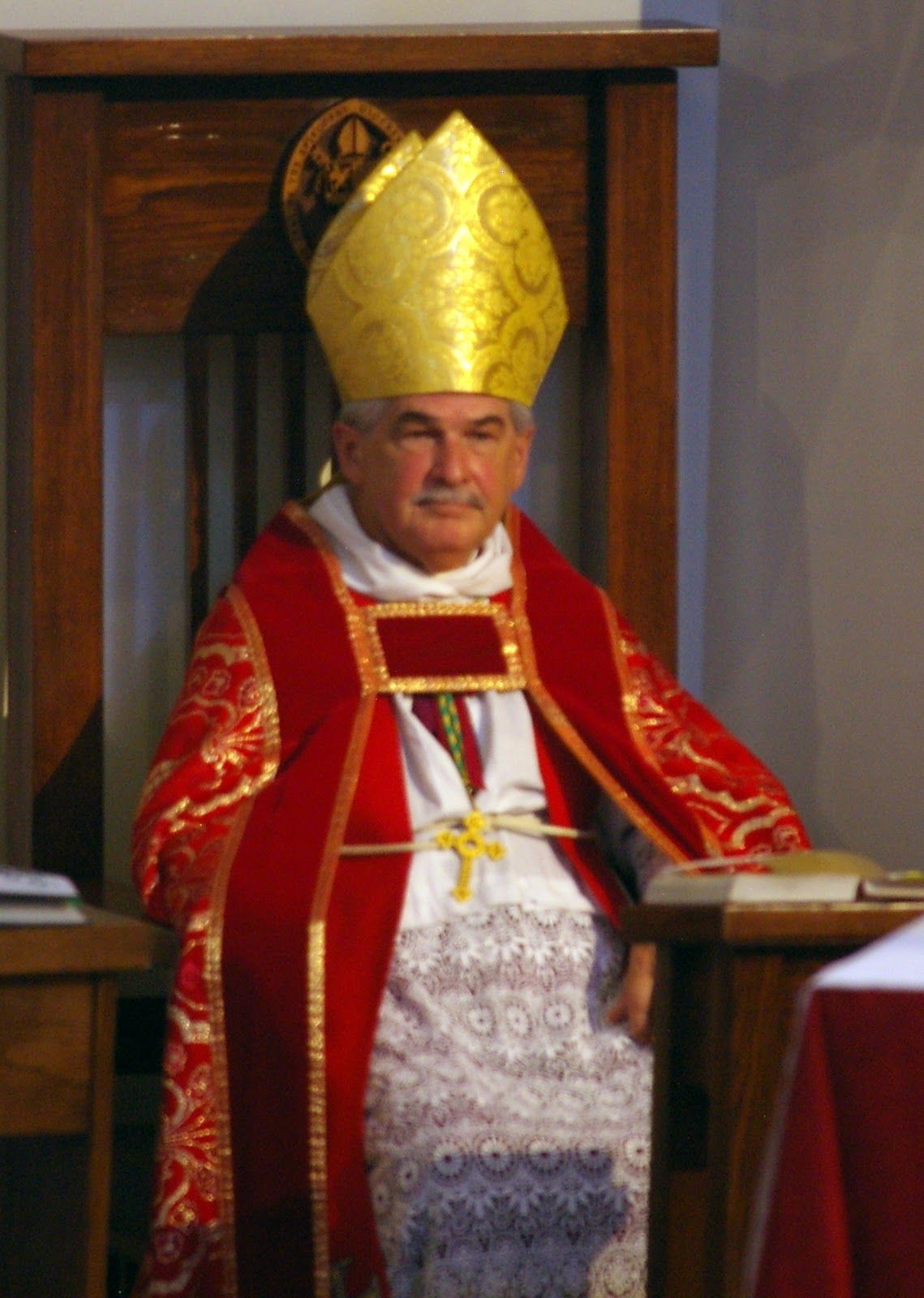
- Iker in his cathedra at St. Vincent's Cathedral
- Church: Episcopal Church (until 2008); ACNA (after 2008)
- See: Episcopal Diocese of Fort Worth
- In office: 1995–2019
- Predecessor: Clarence Pope
- Successor: Ryan S. Reed

Orders
- Consecration: April 24, 1993 by Edmond L. Browning (chief consecrator), Clarence C. Pope, and John McGill Krumm

Personal details
- Born: Jack Leo Iker; August 31, 1949 Cincinnati, Ohio, U.S.
- Died: October 5, 2024 (aged 75)
- Spouse: Donna Bowling (m. 1968)
- Children: 3
- Education: University of Cincinnati; General Theological Seminary

Jack Leo Iker SSC (August 31, 1949 – October 5, 2024) was an American Anglican bishop. From 1995 to 2019, he was the third bishop of the Episcopal Diocese of Fort Worth. In this capacity, he was a leading figure in the Anglican realignment, overseeing the departure of the Diocese of Fort Worth from the Episcopal Church in 2008 and co-founding the Anglican Church in North America. He was also a leading figure in American Anglo-Catholicism and an opponent of women's ordination to the priesthood.

== Biography ==
Iker was a native of Cincinnati, Ohio. He studied at the University of Cincinnati and the General Theological Seminary. Prior to his election as bishop, he was the Rector of the Church of the Redeemer, the largest Episcopal parish in Sarasota, Florida. He served on the boards of Forward in Faith North America and the American Anglican Council. Like many Anglo-Catholic clergy, he was a member of the Society of the Holy Cross.

Iker was the third bishop of the Episcopal Diocese of Fort Worth, consecrated as co-adjutor in 1993 and as incumbent in 1995. He was one of the most theologically conservative bishops during his tenure and would be one of the last Episcopal bishops opposed to women's ordination. In 2008, most of the clergy and parishes in the diocese left the Episcopal Church and affiliated with the Anglican Church in North America. Iker left the Episcopal Church with them, becoming the first bishop of the new diocese. He was one of the founding bishops of the Anglican Church in North America in 2009.

Although Iker's diocese was no longer affiliated with the Episcopal Church, they still wanted to keep owning church properties and the name "The Episcopal Diocese of Fort Worth". In response, the Episcopal Church sued Iker and his diocese three different times. After twelve years of legal battles, the Texas Supreme Court ruled in favor of Iker. Although the Episcopal Church attempted to appeal the case to the US Supreme Court, the court declined to hear the case.

In 2017, Iker declared his diocese was in impaired communion with ACNA dioceses which ordain women:

Most ACNA bishops and dioceses are opposed to women priests, but as it presently stands, the ACNA Constitution says each diocese can decide if it will ordain women priests or not. We now need to work with other dioceses to amend the Constitution to remove this provision. We are in a state of impaired communion because of this issue. The Task Force concluded that "both sides cannot be right." At the conclave, I informed the College of Bishops that I will no longer give consent to the election of any bishop who intends to ordain female priests, nor will I attend the consecration of any such bishop-elect in the future. I have notified the Archbishop of my resignation from all the committees to which I had been assigned to signify that it is no longer possible to have "business as usual" in the College of Bishops due to the refusal of those who are in favor of women priests to at least adopt a moratorium on this divisive practice, for the sake of unity. Bishops who continue to ordain women priests in spite of the received tradition are signs of disunity and division.

After being diagnosed with cancer Iker retired in December 2019, and was succeeded by Ryan S. Reed, SSC.

Iker died on October 5, 2024, at the age of 75.

== See also ==
- Anglican realignment

Anglican Communion titles
Preceded by Clarence C. Pope	III Bishop of Fort Worth (TEC); 1995–2008	Succeeded by Edwin Gulick Jr. provisional
Preceded by Clarence C. Pope	III Bishop of Fort Worth (ACNA); 2008–2019	Succeeded by Ryan Reed
