= Episcopal Diocese of Fort Worth =

Anglican diocese in the United States

Diocese of Fort Worth
- Seal of the Episcopal Diocese of Fort Worth

Location
- Ecclesiastical province: Anglican Church in North America

Statistics
- Parishes: 54 (2025)
- Members: 9,306 (2025)

Information
- Rite: Anglican
- Cathedral: St. Vincent's Cathedral, Bedford

Current leadership
- Bishop: Ryan S. Reed

Website
- fwepiscopal.org

The Episcopal Diocese of Fort Worth is a diocese of the Anglican Church in North America. The diocese comprises 56 congregations and its headquarters are in Fort Worth, Texas.

The diocese is divided in six deaneries, each headed by a dean, which are:

- Fort Worth East (churches in eastern Fort Worth)
- Fort Worth West (churches in western Fort Worth)
- Eastern Deanery (churches in suburbs in eastern Tarrant County, as well as ex-TEC churches in Dallas County and the states of Arkansas and Louisiana)
- Western Deanery (churches on the western side of Tarrant County, as well as in counties west of Tarrant County)
- Southern Deanery (churches in counties south and southwest of Tarrant County, as well as ex-TEC churches in Houston)
- Northern Deanery (churches in counties north and northwest of Tarrant County)

The current bishop is Ryan S. Reed, SSC, consecrated Bishop Coadjutor on September 21, 2019. He became Diocesan after the December 31, 2019, retirement of Jack Iker.

In November 2008 the 26th annual convention of the Episcopal Diocese of Fort Worth voted to dissociate from The Episcopal Church (TEC) and accepted emergency oversight from the Anglican Church of the Southern Cone. In early 2009 The Episcopal Church claimed the right to set up a diocese having the same name and including about a dozen churches that did not wish to leave that jurisdiction. In April 2009 The Episcopal Church and local parties sued The Episcopal Diocese of Fort Worth for all its property. The litigation stretched on for 12 years, with the majority group eventually prevailing in its claims to its name and property in courts at every level. The Episcopal Diocese of Fort Worth is a founding member of the Anglican Church in North America (ACNA) and hosted that province's inaugural assembly in June 2009.

At the time of the vote in 2008 to separate from the Episcopal Church, the diocese had geographically fixed boundaries covering 24 counties in Texas and claimed 19,000 members. Afterward, in accordance with the non-geographical concept of dioceses in the Anglican Church of North America, it began to accept congregations outside its previous territory. In November 2012, the diocese reported 62 congregations, of which 60 are in Texas, one in Louisiana and one in Arkansas. The cathedral of the diocese is St. Vincent's Cathedral in Bedford.

== History ==
=== Position in the Episcopal Church ===
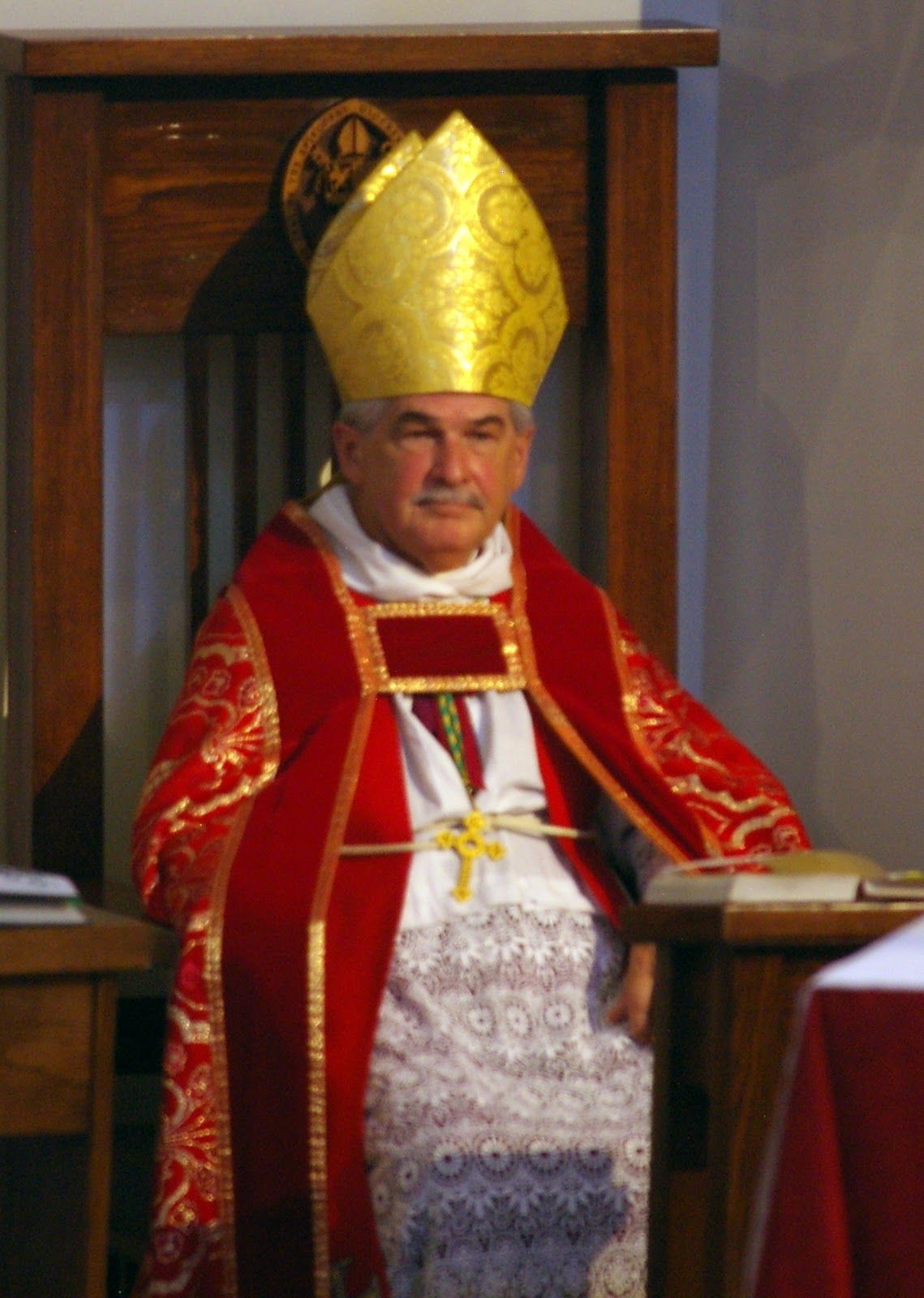
Jack Iker, former Bishop of the Episcopal Diocese of Fort Worth

The Episcopal Diocese of Fort Worth came into being in 1983 and, within The Episcopal Church, was long seen as a leader of Anglo-Catholics and other theological conservatives within American Anglicanism. The third diocesan bishop, Jack Iker, SSC, was the last diocesan bishop in The Episcopal Church who held that a bishop could not ordain women to the priesthood.

In 2006, a substantial majority of the 51 parishes in the diocese affiliated with the Anglican Communion Network, an association of dioceses, parishes, and clergy working to counteract a liberal shift in doctrine and practice that abandons or ignores traditional teaching and discipline.

=== Realignment ===
In November 2008, delegates at a diocesan convention voted to leave the Episcopal Church and join the Anglican Church of the Southern Cone.

The Episcopal Church maintained that the Episcopal Diocese of Fort Worth was still a part of the Episcopal Church, and that only the individuals in favor of these motions had left the Episcopal Church. The decision of convention was challenged on canonical and legal grounds by members from several parishes (the vote to leave TEC was 72 to 19 clergy and 102 to 25 laity), who then reorganized and remained within the Episcopal Church with the Rt. Rev. Ted Gulick as provisional bishop. Following the vote of diocesan convention to leave the Episcopal Church, the Presiding Bishop of the Episcopal Church, Katharine Jefferts Schori, declared that Bishop Iker was inhibited from exercising his office as a bishop in the Episcopal Church, on the grounds that he had violated Title IV, Canon 9, by abandoning the "Doctrine, Discipline or Worship of the Church". In response, Iker rejected the authority of the presiding bishop. Thus, the presiding bishop, on December 5, with the advice and consent of her council of advice (bishops who are the presidents or vice-presidents of each province), deemed that Iker had renounced ordained ministry and declared him removed from it.

The standing committee of the departing diocese declared the inhibition of Iker to be an "illegal, unconstitutional, and uncanonical attempt to interfere with the rights and ministry of a diocese of another province of the Anglican Communion", thus affirming their decision to realign with the Southern Cone. The Episcopal Church, however, rejected this action. The presiding bishop determined that in addition to Bishop Iker's removal, there were no longer any qualified members of the standing committee in the diocese. A new standing committee was appointed from among those who remained loyal to the Episcopal Church.

=== Anglican Church in North America membership ===
In 2009, the diocese was a founding jurisdiction of the Anglican Church in North America (ACNA), the first convention of which was held at St. Vincent's Cathedral. Joining ACNA therefore created a dual affiliation for the diocese, which remains affiliated to the Anglican Church of the Southern Cone of America. In 2017, Bishop Iker declared the diocese to be in a state of "impaired communion" with the dioceses of the ACNA that ordain women to the priesthood.

== Property dispute ==
Both entities claiming to be The Episcopal Diocese of Fort Worth dispute the other's ownership of church properties since the conservatives' split from the Episcopal Church and realignment with the Southern Cone and the Anglican Church of North America.

The trial court initially ruled in favor of the Episcopal Church as to ownership. However, the Supreme Court of Texas ruled on August 30, 2013, to remand the case to the trial court. Specifically, the court ordered the trial court to apply a "neutral principles of law" approach as to ownership of the property. The Supreme Court of the United States denied a petition of the Episcopal Church plaintiffs for the reversal of the decision, on November 3, 2014, returning the case to Texas jurisdiction.

Iker, in a public statement, stated, "We are pleased that the Supreme Court has agreed with our position that the TEC [Episcopal Church] petition for a review was without merit." As the court has explained, a denial of a writ of certiorari cannot be interpreted as anything other than a signal that fewer than four justices of the court deemed it desirable to review the decision of the lower court, and that such a denial indicates nothing about the merits or demerits of a case.

On remand, the trial court ruled in favor of the Episcopal Diocese of Fort Worth (ACNA), but the matter was appealed to the Texas Court of Appeals, Second District. On April 5, 2018, the appeals court ruled that the Corporation of the Episcopal Diocese of Fort Worth held legal title to all properties. The court also ruled that the corporation was controlled by the Episcopal Church group rather than the ACNA group and remanded the case to the trial court for further proceedings in light of the court's opinion. On July 27, 2018, the Episcopal Diocese of Fort Worth (ACNA) filed a petition for review in the Supreme Court of Texas.

On Friday, May 22, 2020, the Texas Supreme Court reversed the judgment of the Second Court of Appeals and affirmed the trial court's ruling in favor of the ACNA group thus giving them legal title to all properties. The Texas Supreme Court ruled that: "(1) resolution of this property dispute does not require consideration of an ecclesiastical question, (2) under the governing documents, the withdrawing faction is the Episcopal Diocese of Fort Worth, and (3) the trial court properly granted summary judgment in the withdrawing faction's favor. We therefore reverse the court of appeals' contrary judgment." Thus, the court again rejected TEC's contention that the determination of property ownership was an ecclesiastical matter which would otherwise require "deferential principles" to the hierarchical church pursuant to the 1st Amendment. The court found that the Fort Worth Diocese was chartered as an unincorporated association and thus falls under the governance of the Texas Uniform Unincorporated Nonprofit Associations act. Under this law, "control and governance are determined by the terms of the Fort Worth Diocese's charters." The charter, in this case, gives amending authority, electing of bishops, officers, etc. to the majority vote of the diocese convention; not TEC. Moreover, the trust held by the diocese does not require affiliation with TEC, so whether or not a diocese can secede from TEC does not affect property rights of the withdrawing diocese nor does the diocese's organizing documents restrict the diocese's authority to amend their constitutions and canons pursuant to the national church's approval. Thus, the majority votes of the Diocesan Conventions of 2007 and 2008 amended the Diocese's charters removing all mention of TEC in compliance with state law. Thus, the real Episcopal Diocese of Fort Worth's identity is determined by what its charters say pursuant to the amendments of 2007 and 2008. The court also rejected, again, the Dennis Canon's validity since TEC worded the Dennis Canon as a "revocable trust" and did not specify that it is "irrevocable" as required by Texas law. Therefore even if the Dennis Canon were valid, it is revokable and was revoked by the diocese in the 1989 amendment to the Diocesan Constitution and Canons. Lastly, in agreement with the Second Court of Appeals, the court ruled that TEC has no standing to pursue claims against the Diocesan Corporation's individual trustees for breach of duties to TEC.

On October 19, 2020, TEC filed for a review of the decision of the Texas Supreme Court in the Supreme Court of the United States, in a final attempt to regain control of the property. On February 22, 2021, SCotUS refused to hear the case.

== Parishes ==
In 2025, the Diocese of Fort Worth had 54 congregations (down 4% from 2022) with 9,306 members (up 9% from 2022) and an average Sunday attendance of 4,983 (up 37% from 2022). Notable parishes in the diocese include:

Church	Image	City	Year founded	Year completed	Notes
St. Andrew's Anglican Church		Fort Worth	1875	1912	Oldest church in the diocese
St. John's Church		Brownwood	1892	1892	NRHP listed
All Saints Church		Fort Worth	1946	1954	Former cathedral (1986–1990)
St. Vincent's Cathedral		Bedford	1955	1989	Diocesan cathedral since 2007
