= Anglican Communion Network =

Network of conservative American parishes

- Formation: 2004
- Type: Conservative Episcopalian/Anglican (religious) group
- Headquarters: Pittsburgh, Pennsylvania
- Location(s): United States and Canada
- Members: 200,000 congregants, 2,200 clergy in 900 affiliated parishes

The Anglican Communion Network (ACN; officially the Network of Anglican Communion Dioceses and Parishes) was a theologically conservative network of Anglican and Episcopalian dioceses and parishes in the United States that was working toward Anglican realignment and developed into the Anglican Church in North America.

== Goals and structure ==
Its key preoccupation was adhering to traditional, orthodox Christian doctrine in the Anglican Communion on subjects such as the infallibility of Scripture and sexual morality (especially regarding the ordination of non-celibate homosexuals and the blessing of same sex unions), particularly in the United States and Canada. Most of the dioceses and parishes were members of the Episcopal Church in the United States of America (ECUSA), while others were under the jurisdiction of overseas bishops from Uganda, Kenya, Bolivia and other countries.

The ACN also included a Forward in Faith convocation of churches, some of which were in the Continuing Anglican Movement. In January 2007, the ACN claimed to have the support of 200,000 laity and 2,200 clergy in ten dioceses and 900 congregations in the United States and Canada.

== Origins ==
The ACN was officially formed in January 2004 at a conference in Plano, Texas, attended by several hundred priests and lay leaders, including 12 Episcopal bishops. Retired Florida Bishop Stephen Hays Jecko was a leader. Its main intent was to provide a system to supply theologically conservative leadership and church oversight to Anglicans in the United States and Canada.

The ACN was formed in response to suggestions by the Archbishop of Canterbury, the Most Reverend Rowan Williams, in the wake of the controversy regarding Anglican views of homosexuality. In the United States the initial controversy was the 2003 consecration of Gene Robinson as bishop of the Episcopal Diocese of New Hampshire. At the time of his election, Robinson was openly living with a same-sex partner.

Some issues date back to the adoption of 1979 Book of Common Prayer. Further controversy followed the election of Presiding Bishop Katharine Jefferts Schori. Statements made by Schori, such as "Our mother Jesus gives birth to a new creation", have also been disputed.

In Canada the main trigger was the approval of the blessing of same-sex unions by the Diocese of Westminster, also in 2003. Most of the work in establishing the ACN was performed by the American Anglican Council, a group of theologically conservative congregations within the Episcopal Church.

The first ACN Moderator was Robert Duncan, seventh bishop of the Episcopal Diocese of Pittsburgh (Episcopal Church), and first Archbishop of the Anglican Church in North America.

== Anglican Relief and Development Fund ==
The Anglican Relief and Development Fund (ARDF) was created by the ACN in 2004 to be a support and humanitarian organisation working with Anglicans in the Global South. The ARDF works on multiple Millennium Development Goals projects throughout Africa, South America, and the Middle East. ARDF is supported by the Church of Nigeria, the Anglican Church of Kenya, the Province of South East Asia, the Church in the Province of the West Indies, and the Church of the Province of West Africa. In 2005 over $1.4 million was donated from ARDF.

== Network dioceses ==
These are the dioceses of the Episcopal Church that were part of ACN from the beginning:

- Diocese of Albany (N.Y.)
- Diocese of Central Florida
- Diocese of Pittsburgh
- Diocese of Quincy (Illinois)
- Diocese of Rio Grande (Texas)
- Diocese of Springfield (Illinois)
- Diocese of Fort Worth (Texas)
- Diocese of South Carolina
- Diocese of Dallas
- Diocese of San Joaquin (California)

Subsequently, the conventions of the dioceses of San Joaquin, Pittsburgh, Quincy, and Fort Worth voted to leave the Episcopal Church. The departing members joined the Anglican Province of the Southern Cone and it is those dioceses that participated in the Network. The members of those dioceses that remained in the Episcopal Church did not indicate an interest in remaining part of the Network.

As of 2026, the Episcopal Diocese of Albany is no longer affiliated.

== Support from Anglican churches and ministries ==
The Common Cause Partnership, founded in June 2004, is an alliance of several churches and ministries that support ACN. The initial meeting was followed by a gathering in February 2005 that resulted in a Statement of Common Cause Partners in North America.

The Common Cause Partners are:

- American Anglican Council
- Anglican Coalition in Canada
- Anglican Mission in America
- Anglican Network in Canada
- Anglican Province of America
- Convocation of Anglicans in North America
- Forward in Faith North America
- Reformed Episcopal Church

== Ecumenical relations ==
In a 2005 meeting, the ACN requested that its moderator send a letter to Pope Benedict XVI to express its greetings and support for upholding the historic teaching and faith of the Church.

== See also ==
- Confessing Movement
