= William S. Thomas =

American bishop (1901–1986)

The Right Reverend William S. Thomas
- Suffragan Bishop of Pittsburgh
- Church: Episcopal Church
- Diocese: Pittsburgh
- Elected: July 1, 1953
- In office: 1953–1971

Orders
- Ordination: July 1927 by Alexander Mann
- Consecration: September 29, 1953 by Austin Pardue

Personal details
- Born: November 21, 1901 Pittsburgh, Pennsylvania, United States
- Died: April 19, 1986 (aged 86) Pittsburgh, Pennsylvania, United States
- Denomination: Anglican
- Parents: William S. Thomas, Sr. & Lillian Amelia Evans
- Spouse: Janet Alice Clutter
- Children: 2, including the Rev. John Thomas (1934–2012)

William S. Thomas Jr. (November 21, 1901 – April 19, 1986) was suffragan bishop of the Episcopal Diocese of Pittsburgh, serving from 1953 to 1971.

== Biography ==
Thomas was born on November 21, 1901, in Pittsburgh, the son of William S. Thomas Sr. and Lillian Amelia Evans. He was educated at the Washington & Jefferson College in Pennsylvania between 1921 and 1922 and then at the University of Pittsburgh from where he graduated with a Bachelor of Arts in 1924. He then attended the Episcopal Theological Seminary and graduated in 1925. He also received honorary Doctor of Divinity degrees from the University of Pittsburgh and the Philadelphia Divinity School.

Thomas was ordained deacon in December 1926 and priest in July 1927, both by Bishop Alexander Mann. He then became rector of All Saints' Church in Aliquippa, Pennsylvania and priest-in-charge at St. Luke's Episcopal Church in Georgetown, Pennsylvania. In 1936 he became assistant priest at Calvary Church in Pittsburgh and in 1940 he became canon of the cathedral chapter of St Paul's Cathedral in Boston. In 1942 he was appointed Archdeacon of Pittsburgh, a post he held until 1953.

He was elected Suffragan Bishop of Pittsburgh during a special diocesan convention that took place in Trinity Cathedral on July 1, 1953. He was then consecrated on September 29, 1953, by Bishop Austin Pardue of Pittsburgh. He retained the post till his retirement in 1971.

== Sources ==
- Bishop Thomas Dies at 84 Episcopal News Service. April 24, 1986.
