= Thomas McKenzie (priest) =

American author and Anglican priest (1971–2021)

The Reverend Thomas McKenzie
- Rector of the Church of the Redeemer
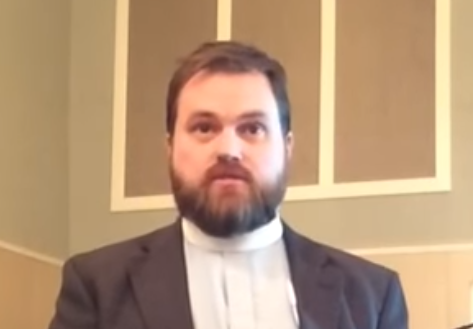
- Thomas McKenzie speaks at the Church of the Redeemer in 2014.
- Church: Anglican Church in North America

Orders
- Ordination: 1998 by Robert Duncan

Personal details
- Born: August 5, 1971 Texas
- Died: August 23, 2021 (aged 50) Dickson County, Tennessee
- Denomination: Anglican
- Residence: Nashville, Tennessee
- Spouse: Laura McKenzie
- Children: 2
- Occupation: Priest, author of The Anglican Way
- Education: University of Texas at Austin; Trinity Episcopal School for Ministry

Robert Thomas McKenzie (August 5, 1971 – August 23, 2021) was an American Anglican priest and author best known for his 2014 guidebook to Anglicanism, The Anglican Way, which was often used to introduce evangelical Christians to the Anglican tradition.

== Early life and education ==
McKenzie was born in 1971 in the Texas panhandle and raised in Canyon. Although he attended an Episcopal Church growing up, his family was non-religious. He had a conversion experience while participating in an Episcopal campus ministry while a student at the University of Texas at Austin. After graduating, he completed seminary at Trinity Episcopal School for Ministry and was ordained in the Episcopal Diocese of Pittsburgh in 1998. McKenzie was married to Laura, and they had two children.

== Ordained ministry ==
McKenzie began his ministry as assistant rector of St. Bartholomew's Episcopal Church in Nashville. In 2003, a few years after he became a priest, the Episcopal Church consecrated the openly gay Gene Robinson as a bishop, triggering what would become known as the Anglican realignment. McKenzie joined 14 priests in the Episcopal Diocese of Tennessee in signing a public statement that condemned the church's action in consecrating Robinson. "Certainly, the actions of the General Convention were schismatic and fractured our national denomination," he said to The Tennessean. "We're hoping to be able to respond in a creative and constructive way to their destructive action."

McKenzie left the Episcopal Church and joined the Anglican Mission in the Americas (AMiA), through which he planted Church of the Redeemer in Nashville in 2004. Redeemer grew, less from disaffected Episcopalians and more from evangelical Christians without a background in Anglicanism. In 2009, McKenzie was champion of the formation of the Anglican Church in North America (ACNA), of which the AMiA was a founding member. In 2012, after the AMiA had partially withdrawn from the ACNA and several AMiA bishops left their canonical residence in the Anglican Church of Rwanda, McKenzie and Redeemer remained affiliated with the Rwandan church until transferring into the Anglican Diocese of Pittsburgh. Redeemer grew to have several hundred people in attendance and planted "daughter" churches in the Nashville area.

Within the ACNA, McKenzie introduced author Tish Harrison Warren and her family to the Anglican tradition and mentored her during her ordination process.

== Writings ==
McKenzie is best known for The Anglican Way: A Guidebook, a 2014 volume that introduced many evangelicals to the basics of Anglicanism. The book also became a common text for newcomer and confirmation classes in Anglican churches. In it, McKenzie used the image of a compass rose to argue that Anglicanism holds together what many evangelicals may have considered binary opposites, such as liberalism and conservatism or catholicity and charismaticism. According to reviewer Greg Goebel, for McKenzie, "these things can not only hold together, but also temper and correct one another." McKenzie described "the Anglican way of faith" as "at best, a way of balance." Theologian Gerald McDermott called the book "breezy," noting that The Anglican Way "has guided many into Anglicanism, but without deep rooting in the tradition."

Later in life, McKenzie received attention for political commentary. In February 2016, prior to the Super Tuesday primary elections, he wrote a personal blog post condemning then-candidate Donald Trump. "Donald Trump is endlessly entertaining. If this election were a reality show, I’d watch every episode. But it’s not. This is too important. This isn’t funny anymore," McKenzie wrote. "I oppose his election as President, and believe that any other candidate now running, from either party, would make a better President. I believe his election would be dangerous to our country, and to the Church." The post received over a million pageviews within two weeks and triggered a backlash against McKenzie from Trump supporters. In February 2020, during Trump's reelection campaign, McKenzie stated that he had lost friends and parishioners since writing his blog post, but he pledged to vote for whomever the Democratic nominee turned out to be. "In Christianity, we always want a choice between good and evil, but the fallen world often only gives us a choice between evil and more evil. I usually have to take the less evil, and, at this point, any of the Democrats are less evil."

During the COVID-19 pandemic, McKenzie became outspoken on social media on issues related to vaccination and social distancing. He opposed a Nashville protest against capacity restrictions on worship.

== Death ==
On August 23, 2021, McKenzie began a road trip to Santa Fe with his 22-year-old child Charlie, who was returning as a student at St. John's College. After the trip, McKenzie planned to commence a sabbatical that would include a study trip to England and walking the Camino de Santiago. West of Nashville, near Burns, Tennessee, McKenzie's car collided with a tractor trailer on Interstate 40, killing him and Charlie. Funeral services for Thomas and Charlie were held at the Church of the Redeemer on August 28.

== Bibliography ==
- McKenzie, Thomas (2013). The Harpooner: A Devotional Guide for Advent. Nashville, Tennessee: Colony Catherine. ISBN 978-1493673742.
- McKenzie, Thomas (2014). The Anglican Way: A Guidebook. Nashville, Tennessee: Rabbit Room. ISBN 978-0996049900.
- McKenzie, Thomas (2019). Lent with the Desert Fathers. Nashville, Tennessee: Colony Catherine. ISBN 978-0996049931.
