= Tish Harrison Warren =

American author and Anglican priest

The Reverend Tish Harrison Warren
- Born: Austin, Texas
- Education: Wake Forest University; Gordon–Conwell Theological Seminary
- Occupation: Priest (Anglican Church in North America)
- Spouse: Jonathan Warren Pagán
- Children: 3
- Writing career
- Notable works: Liturgy of the Ordinary, Prayer in the Night
- Notable awards: Book of the Year, Christianity Today (2018, 2022); Christian Book of the Year, ECPA (2022)
- Website: tishharrisonwarren.com

Tish Harrison Warren is an American author and Anglican priest. She is known for the award-winning books Liturgy of the Ordinary (2016) and Prayer in the Night (2021), as well as for being a New York Times newsletter columnist.

== Early life and education ==
She attended Wake Forest University, where she met her husband, Jonathan Warren Pagán, and graduated in 2001.

Warren had grown up in Southern Baptist churches; after college, she joined a Presbyterian Church in America congregation and interned in mercy ministries with a goal of working in full-time ministry. She and her husband enrolled in Gordon-Conwell Theological Seminary, where she graduated in with an M.A. in theology, and they moved to Nashville, where Warren Pagán undertook Ph.D. studies in church history at Vanderbilt University and Warren worked as campus staff for InterVarsity Christian Fellowship (IVCF) at Vanderbilt.

== InterVarsity at Vanderbilt ==
As a staff member for IVCF's Graduate Christian Fellowship chapter at Vanderbilt in 2011, Warren became a key figure in Vanderbilt's controversial "all-comers" policy requiring officially recognized campus religious groups to accept as leaders people of any faith, including those who did not share the group's faith. According to NPR, "[t]he policy is forcing a dilemma for faith-based organizations: Either drop requirements that their leaders hold certain beliefs, or forfeit school funding and move off campus."

IVCF, along with several other campus religious groups, argued that allowing non-adherents of its religious tradition to serve in leadership roles would require "student communities to surrender their particularities to guard against controversy and debate," Warren said at the time. In May 2011, Warren's group and others were put on probationary status. By the end of the spring 2012 semester, 15 campus faith groups representing evangelical, Catholic, and Mormon traditions—including IVCF, Baptist Collegiate Network, Fellowship of Christian Athletes, and Vandy Catholic—were deregistered and lost access to designated campus meeting spaces and on-campus recruiting. Other evangelical groups, such as the PCA-affiliated Reformed University Fellowship, decided to accept Vanderbilt's terms for student leader participation.

Warren framed the issue as one of the sustainability of pluralism in the university context. "Couching this discussion as 'the university vs. Christian students' is inaccurate, unhelpful, and allows the conversation to be caricatured and dismissed. Instead, this debate reflects a much more crucial question: Do we want different communities with conflicting narratives and ideologies to be authentically represented on campus or not?" She wrote. "[T]he proper resolution is not to abrogate conflicting ideologies, but to learn to embody our robust particularities respectfully and intelligently."

In response, the Tennessee General Assembly passed HB 2576, which would have forced universities in Tennessee (including private schools like Vanderbilt) either to exempt religious groups from "all-comers"-style policies or to include their fraternities and sororities in the policy, which Vanderbilt had continued to exempt. In May 2012, Tennessee Gov. Bill Haslam issued his first gubernatorial veto, stating that "[a]lthough I disagree with Vanderbilt's policy, as someone who strongly believes in limited government, I think it is inappropriate for government to mandate the policies of a private institution." Warren responded with appreciation for Haslam's comments and said she "hope[s] that he will personally engage with both Vanderbilt administrators and the Christian groups on campus. Whether or not the legislature chooses to reintroduce the legislation, we will continue to seek to persuade the university to acknowledge the need of faith-based groups to select their leaders according to faith-based criteria."

In April 2013, Haslam signed a similar version of the law that applied only to public universities in Tennessee, exempting private schools like Vanderbilt. As of 2023, IVCF remains an unrecognized organization at Vanderbilt.

Of the experience, Warren later wrote: "I thought I was an acceptable kind of evangelical. I'm not a fundamentalist. My friends and I enjoy art, alcohol, and cultural engagement. We avoid spiritual clichés and buzzwords. We value authenticity, study, racial reconciliation, and social and environmental justice. Being a Christian made me somewhat weird in my urban, progressive context, but despite some clear differences, I held a lot in common with unbelieving friends. We could disagree about truth, spirituality, and morality, and remain on the best of terms. . . . Then, two years ago, the student organization I worked for at Vanderbilt University got kicked off campus for being the wrong kind of Christians."

== Writing career ==
According to Religion News Service, Warren "did not set out to become a professional writer and only began writing in 2013, when as an InterVarsity staff member she published a short piece for [IVCF blog] The Well that went viral." The article addressed how she—who as a young woman had lived in intentional Christian communities, been attracted to "New Monasticism" and Dorothy Day and worked with impoverished populations in the U.S. abroad—found herself "a thirty-something with two kids living a more or less ordinary life. And what I'm slowly realizing is that, for me, being in the house all day with a baby and a two-year-old is a lot more scary and a lot harder than being in a war-torn African village. What I need courage for is the ordinary, the daily every-dayness of life."

=== Liturgy of the Ordinary ===
In 2016, InterVarsity Press published Warren's first book, Liturgy of the Ordinary, an expansion of that theme involving daily habits and practices. According to Religion News Service columnist Jonathan Merritt, "Tish Harrison Warren says we can't know God in the abstract, but only in the concrete. So she explores ways to transform your mundane routines into meaningful rituals. The kind of rituals that nurture God's presence and awaken your spirit to new life. Here we discuss how everything from making your bed to brushing your teeth can help you uncover holy in your midst."

Liturgy of the Ordinary was well-reviewed; Publishers Weekly gave it a starred review, noting that "Warren seamlessly blends together lived realities with theological reflections. Her writing is lyrical and often humorous, and she has a gift for making theological concepts seem easy to understand and (perhaps most importantly) easy to live." The Gospel Coalition's Themelios journal called it "a delightful book that should find a receptive audience among evangelicals of all stripes and types." The Themelios reviewer noted that Warren was influenced by Calvin University's James K. A. Smith, "tak[ing] Smith's more technical treatment of a liturgical approach to culture, popularizes it, and applies it to the “micro-culture” that is every individual's or family's particular experiences."

The Christianity Today reviewer noted that "Liturgy of the Ordinary isn't the first book written in praise of prosaic moments, and Warren's isn't the first voice to counsel slowing down. But Warren admirably explores these themes from both a theological and practical perspective." Christianity Today later named Liturgy of the Ordinary its 2018 Book of the Year.

In 2019, InterVarsity Press announced that counterfeiters had sold $240,000 worth of fake copies of Liturgy of the Ordinary on Amazon—as many as 20,000 copies, compared to the 121,000 legitimate copies sold by IVP up to that point, the press estimated, part of a wave of literary piracy revealed that year to have affected several major authors.

=== Prayer in the Night ===
Warren's second book, Prayer in the Night: For Those Who Work or Watch or Weep, was released in 2021. Its title alludes to a prayer in the Book of Common Prayer's liturgy for Compline, which Warren prayed in 2017, a year in which her father died and she suffered miscarriage. According to the Gospel Coalition's review, "Warren offers the inherited prayers and liturgical practices of the church as cairns to follow, manmade stone structures that point us in the right direction when the fog of suffering obscures our way." Prayer in the Night was recognized as book of the year by the ECPA.

In 2022, Warren co-authored a children's book called Little Prayers for Ordinary Days.

=== New York Times newsletter ===
In August 2021, the New York Times "Opinion" section launched its first set of subscriber-only email newsletters, with Warren brought on to "reflect on matters of faith in private life and public discourse." Other authors of Times-exclusive newsletters alongside Warren were Tressie McMillan Cottom, Jay Caspian Kang, Kara Swisher, and John McWhorter.

Warren's newsletters—also published as columns on the Times website—have addressed topics like abortion, COVID-19, smartphone use, sexual abuse in churches, religious freedom, and pluralism. Warren's columns have attracted controversy. In a January 2022 column recommending churches drop online services, Warren wrote that "the cost of being apart from one another is steep. People need physical touch and interaction. We need to connect with other human beings through our bodies, through the ordinary vulnerability of looking into their eyes, hearing their voice, sharing their space, their smells, their presence. . . . [E]mbodiment is a particularly important part of Christian spirituality and theology."

The column received pushback from commentators, with Episcopal historian Diana Butler Bass saying, "I'm getting phone calls asking me how the Episcopal Church can harbor views like Tish Warren's on disability. . . . Michael Curry's office should be on the freaking phone with the editor of the New York Times about this - because her posing as "Anglican" (as well as another writer they host on their platform) is creating real problems at this point." Warren, who is a priest in the Anglican Church in North America, acknowledged the response to her column, noting in particular the value of online services for the disabled. Warren's defenders included Campaign president Justin Giboney, who said that Warren "stands in the middle of the public square and addresses society with love and truth. No one is above critique, but we should all recognize Tish's courage, intellectual honesty and faithfulness."

Warren published the final issue of her newsletter in August 2023.

== Ordination and ministry career ==
After leaving IVCF at Vanderbilt, Warren served as a campus staff member for IVCF at the University of Texas. At the same time, Warren was in the ordination process in the Anglican Diocese of Pittsburgh under the mentorship of Thomas McKenzie. She and her husband were ordained to the priesthood in 2014 by Archbishop Robert Duncan. The Warrens became co-associate rectors at the Church of the Ascension in Pittsburgh in 2017. In 2021, they returned to Austin to serve at a church in the Diocese of Churches for the Sake of Others.

Warren held complementarian views for most of her life, but during the Warrens' seminary studies, Jonathan Warren changed his views on women's ordination. “That began a journey of him and I reading and arguing and studying,” Tish Warren said. “The joke is that eventually I finally submitted to my husband and got ordained.” However, Warren has said that she dislikes arguing about women's ordination. "[F]ew of us become pastors in order to talk about women's ordination. We get ordained because the gospel has captured our imaginations." She has also said that she rarely wears her clerical collar in public so as not to be treated as an avatar of a theological or cultural debate.

== Bibliography ==
- Warren, Tish Harrison (2016). Liturgy of the Ordinary: Sacred Practices in Everyday Life. Carol Stream, Illinois: InterVarsity Press. ISBN 978-0-8308-4711-2.
- Warren, Tish Harrison (2021). Prayer in the Night: For Those Who Work or Watch or Weep. Carol Stream, Illinois: InterVarsity Press. ISBN 978-0-8308-4679-5.
- Hutson, Katy Bowser; Oakes, Flo Paris; Warren, Tish Harrison (2022). Little Prayers for Ordinary Days. Carol Stream, Illinois: InterVarsity Press. ISBN 978-1-5140-0339-8.
- Warren, Tish Harrison (2023). McCaulley, Esau (ed.). Advent: The Season of Hope. Carol Stream, Illinois: InterVarsity Press. ISBN 9781514000182.
