= Jim Hobby =

American Anglican Church bishop

The Right Reverend Jim Hobby
- Bishop of Pittsburgh
- Church: Anglican Church in North America
- Diocese: Pittsburgh
- In office: 2016–2020
- Predecessor: Robert Duncan
- Successor: Alex Cameron
- Previous post(s): Rector of Trinity Church, Thomasville, Georgia

Orders
- Ordination: June 7, 1986 (deacon); December 4, 1986 (priest) by Alden Hathaway
- Consecration: September 10, 2016 by Robert Duncan

Personal details
- Born: James Lafayette Hobby Jr.

James Lafayette Hobby Jr. is a former American bishop of the Anglican Church in North America. He was elected the second bishop of the Anglican Diocese of Pittsburgh on 23 April 2016 and enthroned on 10 September 2016. He is married to Shari, also an Anglican priest, and they have three daughters.

== Ecclesiastical career ==
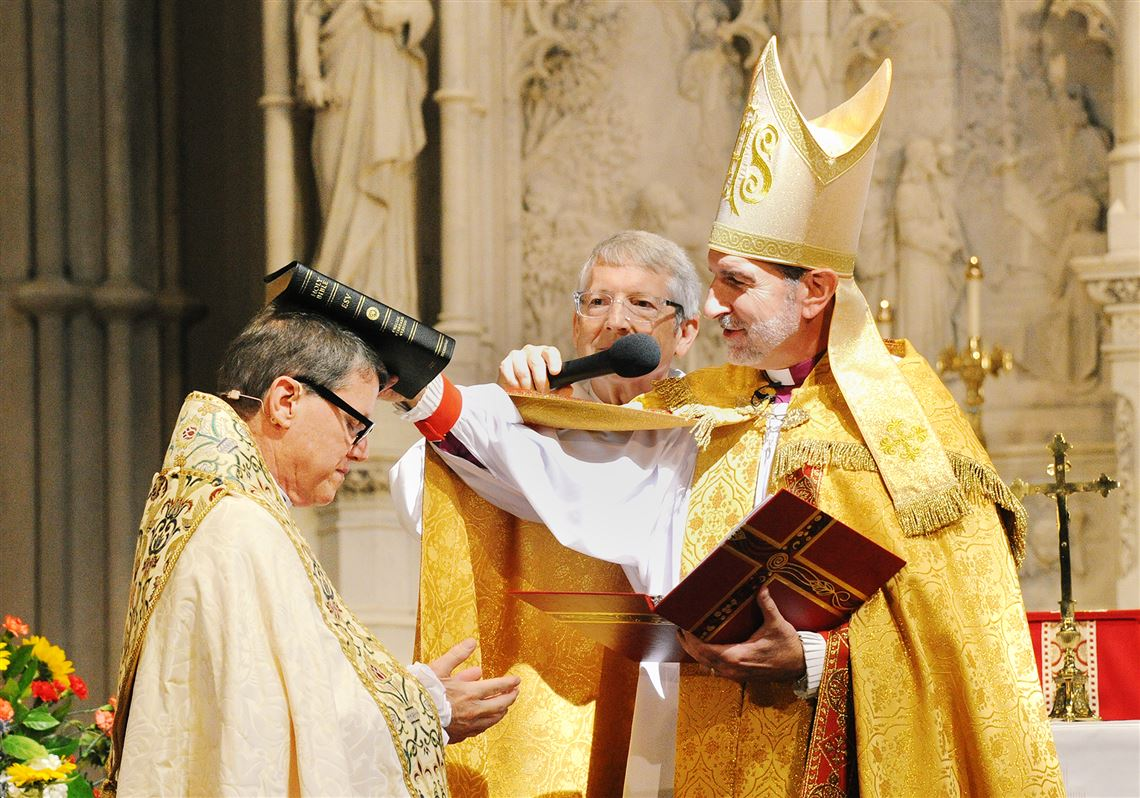
Archbishop Foley Beach presenting a Bible to Bishop Hobby at his consecration.

He was raised in a Presbyterian household but moved to a Baptist church in New Jersey. He studied at the Wheaton College, in Wheaton, Illinois, from 1975 to 1979, where he decided to become a minister and met his wife, Shari. After her graduation, both decided to study at Gordon-Conwell Theological Seminary, in South Hamilton, Massachusetts, from 1981 to 1983. They soon joined the Episcopal Church. Afterwards, they studied at the Trinity School for Ministry, in Ambridge, Pennsylvania, where he was a student from 1983 to 1985, graduating with a M.Div.

He was ordained a deacon at 7 June 1986 and a priest at 4 December 1986 by bishop Alden Hathaway, of the Episcopal Diocese of Pittsburgh. He was rector at St. Paul's Episcopal Church, in Monongahela, and vicar at St. John's Episcopal Church, in Donora, from 1986 to 1990, being assistant at the first parish from 1990 to 1993, rector at Advent Episcopal Church, in Tallahassee, Florida, from 1993 to 2001, priest and missionary-in-residence at St. John's Episcopal Church, in Tallahassee, from 2002 to 2005, and priest and missionary-in-residence at St. Peter's Anglican Church, in Tallahassee, from 2005 to 2007. He was rector at Trinity Anglican Church, in Thomasville, Georgia, since 2007. He joined the Anglican realignment in United States, and his parish is a member of the Anglican Church in North America, founded in 2009, and the Gulf Atlantic Diocese, founded in 2011. He was a candidate to bishop but lost to Neil Lebhar. He was a member of the Ordination Preparation Team, since 2009, and Canon for Congregational Development, since 2010, at his former diocese.

Hobby was elected bishop of the Anglican Diocese of Pittsburgh at a diocesan meeting that took place at St. Stephen's Church, Sewickley, on 22–23 April 2016, among six candidates, at the fifth ballot. Hobby consecration took place at the Roman Catholic Saint Paul Cathedral, Pittsburgh, on 10 September 2016.

He resigned, upon request, on 28 October 2020, after what was described as "a careful review and assessment of his handling of a serious pastoral matter".

Anglican Communion titles
Preceded by Robert Duncan	VIII Bishop of Pittsburgh; 2016–2020	Succeeded by Martyn Minns (interim); Alex Cameron (diocesan)
