= St. Peter's Anglican Church (Uniontown, Pennsylvania) =

Historic Anglican church in Uniontown, Pennsylvania, United States

Coordinates: 39°54′00″N 79°43′41″W

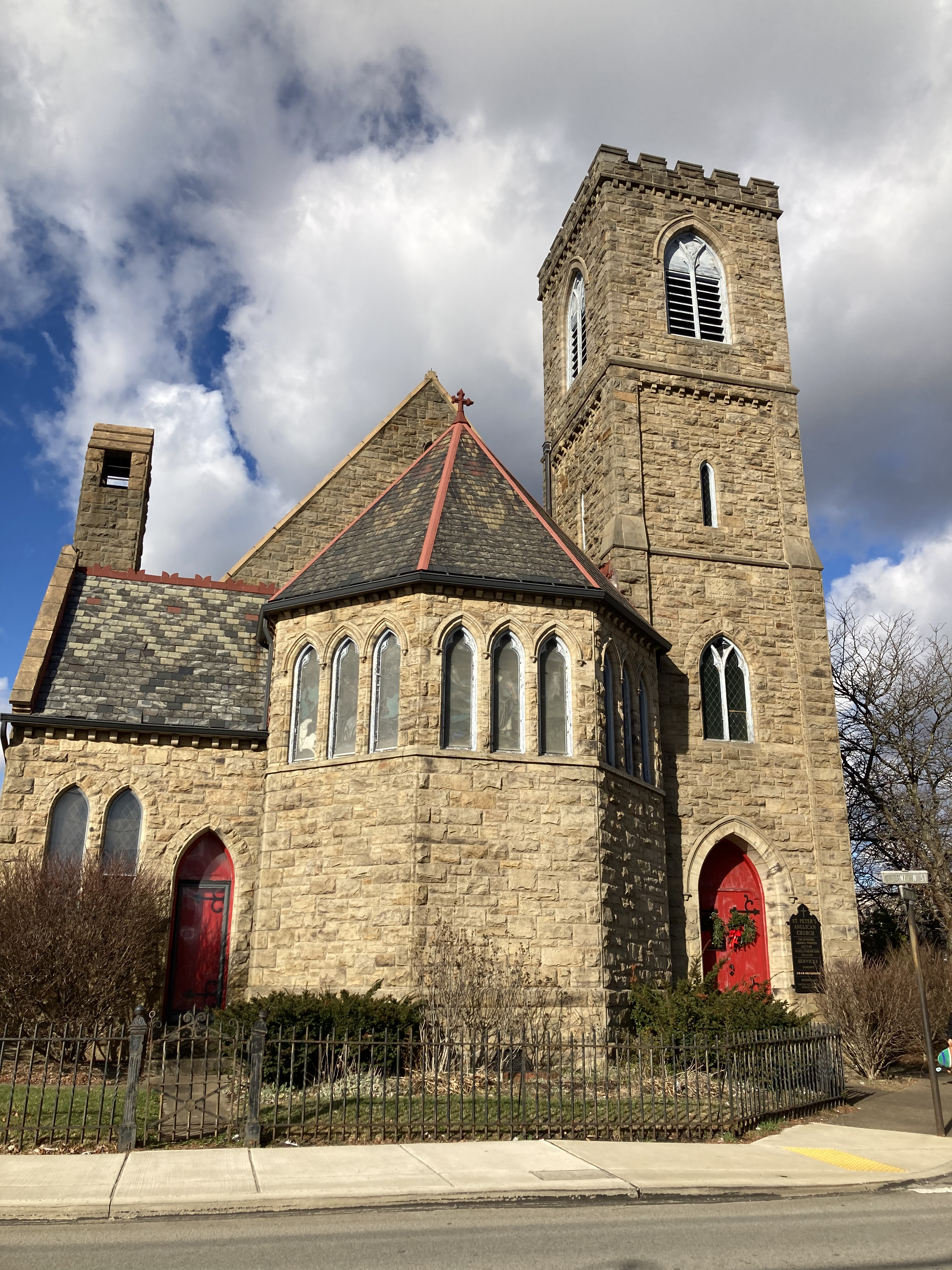
- St. Peter's Anglican Church
- Location: 60 Morgantown Street, Uniontown, Pennsylvania
- Country: United States
- Denomination: Anglican Church in North America
- Website: stpetersanglicancup.org

History
- Founded: 1838
- Dedicated: 1885

Architecture
- Architect: Charles Marquedent Burns
- Style: Gothic Revival
- Years built: 1884–1885

Administration
- Diocese: Pittsburgh

Clergy
- Rector: The Rev. Bill Starke
- St. Peter's Anglican Church
- U.S. Historic district – Contributing property
- Part of: Uniontown Downtown Historic District (ID89000357)
- Added to NRHP: May 19, 1989

St. Peter's Anglican Church is a historic Anglican church in Uniontown, Pennsylvania. Completed in 1885, the church is a contributing property to the Uniontown Downtown Historic District.

== History ==
The earliest records of Anglican services in Uniontown date to 1828, when Bishop Henry Onderdonk celebrated services there during a trip through southwestern Pennsylvania. St. Peter's Church was founded in 1838, and the present-day church was built in 1884–1885.

In 2008, as part of the Anglican realignment, St. Peter's joined the majority of the Episcopal Diocese of Pittsburgh in disassociating from the Episcopal Church and forming the Anglican Diocese of Pittsburgh under Bishop Robert Duncan. In March 2018, St. Peter's and eight other congregations in the Anglican Diocese of Pittsburgh reached a settlement over property ownership with the Episcopal Church. Under the settlement, St. Peter's retained legal title to its property. But to reflect the Episcopal diocese's "trust beneficiary rights" in the properties, St. Peter's agreed to pay an annual fee amounting to 3.25 percent of its operating revenues to the diocese for the first 20 years after the agreement, followed by an annual fee of 1.75 percent of its operating revenues in subsequent years.

== Architecture ==
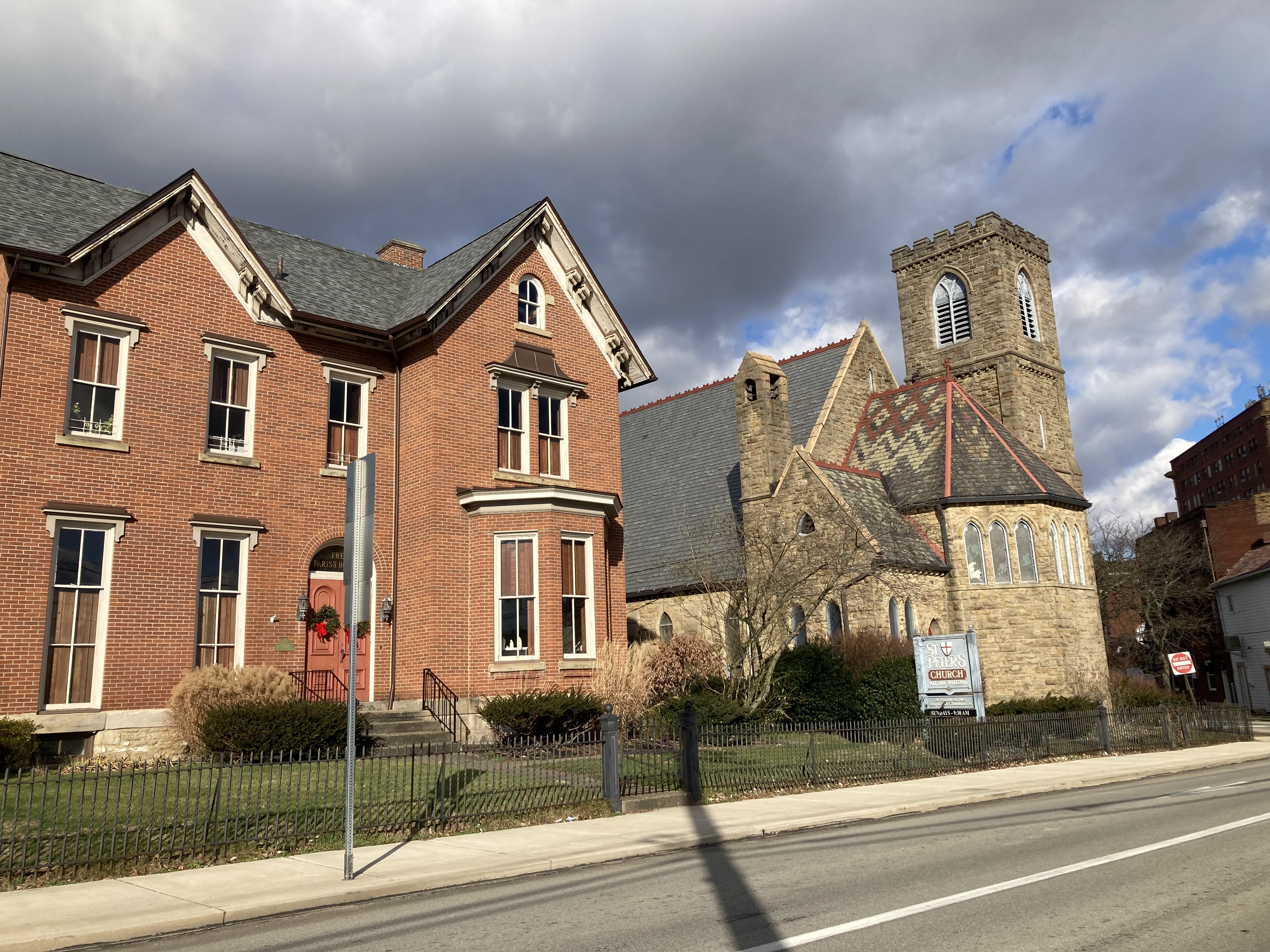
St. Peter's Anglican Church viewed from Morgantown Street, with the 1868 parish house on the left.

The church was designed by Charles Marquedent Burns in the early English Gothic style. It features a Norman tower without a spire, flanked by smaller towers and a patterned slate roof typical of Victorian Gothic Revival designs.

The interior of the church features at least one window from the studio of Louis Comfort Tiffany.

Just south of the church at 48 Morgantown Street is the St. Peter's parish house. A two-story brick residence that was built in 1868, it is also a contributing property to the Uniontown Downtown Historic District.

== Notable members ==
St. Peter's was the childhood congregation of future Gen. George C. Marshall, a Uniontown native.
