= Alex Mann =

Alex Mann may refer to:

- Alex Mann (bobsleigh)
- Alex Mann (rugby union)

== See also ==
- Alexander Mann, Scottish painter
- Alexander Mann (bishop), American bishop
