= Robert Appleyard =

Robert Appleyard may refer to:

- Bob Appleyard (1924–2015), English cricketer
- Robert Appleyard (bishop) (1917–1999), bishop of the Episcopal Diocese of Pittsburgh
