= Alex Cameron (bishop) =

Canada-born American Anglican bishop

The Right Reverend Alex Cameron
- Bishop of Pittsburgh
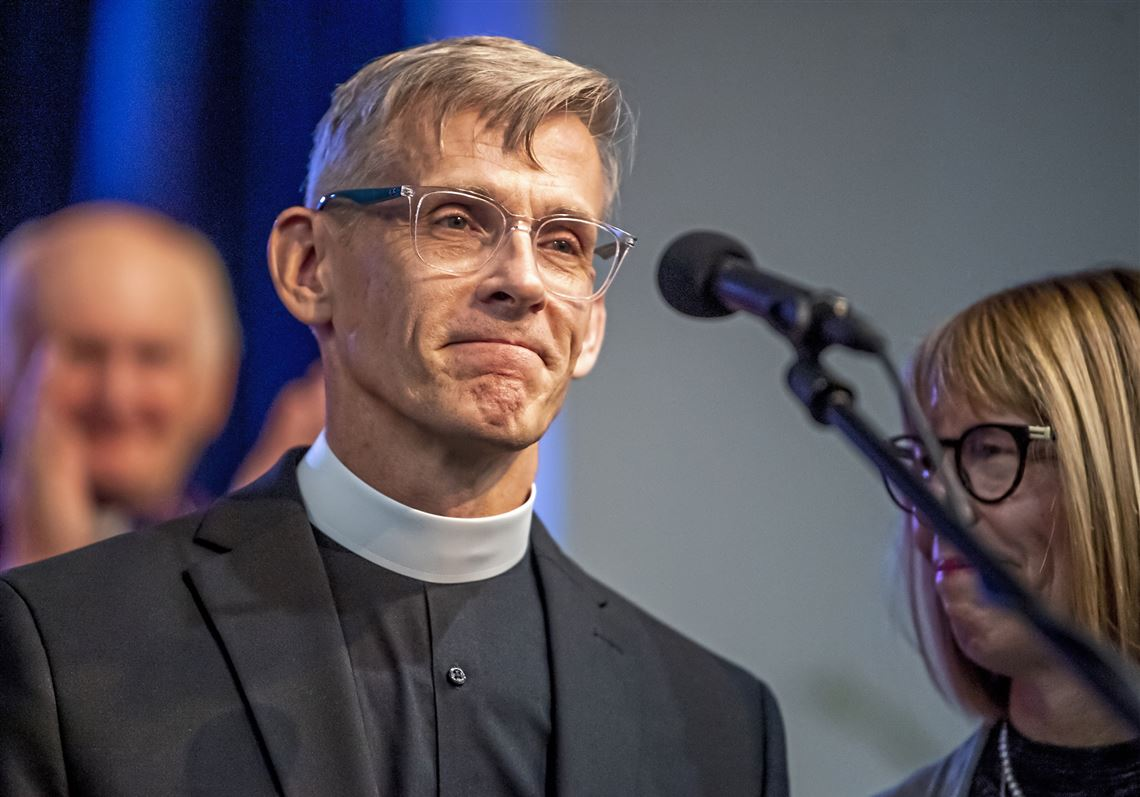
- Church: Anglican Church in North America
- Diocese: Pittsburgh
- In office: 2022–present
- Predecessor: Jim Hobby

Orders
- Ordination: 1990 (deacon); 1991 (priest)
- Consecration: 6 August 2022 by Foley Beach

Personal details
- Born: 1964 (age 61–62)
- Parents: Sandy Cameron

Alex Whitcomb Cameron (born 1964) is a Canadian-born bishop of the Anglican Church in North America. In August 2022, he became bishop of the Anglican Diocese of Pittsburgh, succeeding Jim Hobby after a nearly two-year interim period. Cameron was previously an Anglican priest in Canada and the United States and a manager at GE Healthcare.

== Early life, education, and early ministry ==
Cameron was born in Nova Scotia, the son of provincial Liberal Party leader Sandy Cameron, grandson of Alexander W. Cameron, and great-grandson of Alexander F. Cameron, all of whom served as Nova Scotia MLAs for Guysborough. Cameron has said he grew up in a family that was not particularly religious and that they infrequently attended church but had a strong sense of public service. Cameron attended Dalhousie University in Halifax. During a study abroad program in France, he experienced a religious conversion and began attending an Anglican church in Halifax upon his return. It was here where he met his future wife, Tamara; they were married in February 1987. They have four adult children and three grandchildren.

Experiencing a call to ordained ministry, Cameron received his M.Div. from Wycliffe College in Toronto in 1990 and was ordained in the Anglican Diocese of Montreal. He served for a decade in the diocese, first as a curate at a large church, then as rector, first of a small rural congregation and then six years at a larger suburban church. Starting in 1997, Cameron also began working as a counselor with the Isaiah 40 Foundation, a healing and reconciliation ministry headquartered in Montreal. During his final rectorate in Montreal, he said that he was locking up after a routine vestry meeting when he thought, "Once a month until I'm 65. I don't think so." Cameron said he experienced a call to work outside of full-time church ministry.

== Business and nonprofit leadership ==
Cameron pursued additional study in information technology and software development, then moved to Burlington, Vermont, to pursue a career in health informatics at IDX Systems, which was acquired by GE Healthcare. He spent nearly a decade at the two companies, rising to the role of engineering director for Americas radiology workflow and leading teams of software engineers in the United States, Europe, and India. He later ran a consulting company.

Cameron also served bivocationally from 2009 to 2014 as the rector of St. Timothy's Anglican Church in Burlington, a church plant of the Anglican Diocese in New England. He has said that due to time constraints from his business sector job, he was not able to preach each week and relied on a team of trained and licensed lay ministers to assist with preaching and other church leadership functions. He later worked full-time as rector of St. Timothy's.

== Return to full-time ministry ==
In 2015, Cameron succeeded the late founder of Isaiah 40, Vina Sweetman, as head of the organization. As president and CEO, he incorporated it in the United States as well as Canada to facilitate operations across North America. He moved to Chicago to lead the organization, where he also served as acting dean for the Greenhouse Movement deanery of the Upper Midwest Diocese and later as chairman of the diocese's Bishop's Council.

On 30 April 2022, Cameron was elected bishop of the Anglican Diocese of Pittsburgh on the first ballot. He was consecrated and installed as bishop by Foley Beach on 6 August 2022 at the Church of the Ascension.

== Bishop of Pittsburgh ==
In February 2026, Cameron was scheduled to speak on an ACNA webinar based on the book Safe Church: How to Guard Against Sexism and Abuse in Christian Communities by therapist Andrew Bauman. The webinar was canceled by the province in consultation with Cameron after online criticism of Safe Church as "too dismissive of the Bible".

Anglican Communion titles
Preceded by Jim Hobby (diocesan); Martyn Minns (interim)	IX Bishop of Pittsburgh; 2022–present	Incumbent
