= Uniontown Downtown Historic District =

Historic district in Pennsylvania, United States

- U.S. National Register of Historic Places
- U.S. Historic district
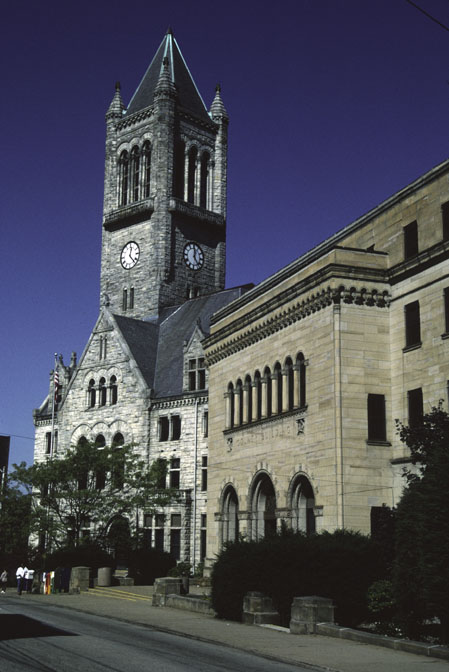
- Fayette County Courthouse, May 1999

- Location within Pennsylvania Location within the United States
- Location: Roughly Main St., between Court St. and Mill St., Uniontown, Pennsylvania
- Coordinates: 39°54′04″N 79°43′33″W
- Area: 31.3 acres (12.7 ha)
- Architect: Multiple
- Architectural style: Moderne, Late Victorian, Georgian
- NRHP reference No.: 89000357, 03000036 (Boundary Increase)
- Added to NRHP: May 19, 1989, February 14, 2003 (Boundary Increase)

The Uniontown Downtown Historic District is a national historic district that is located in Uniontown, Fayette County, Pennsylvania, United States.

It was added to the National Register of Historic Places in 1989, with a boundary increase in 2003.

== History and architectural features ==
This district includes 113 contributing buildings and one contributing site that are located in the central business district of Uniontown. Most of the contributing buildings were built between 1881 and 1932 and are representative of a number of popular architectural styles, including Classical Revival, Moderne, Late Victorian, and Georgian. Twenty-two buildings date between 1811 and 1860. Notable buildings include the Fayette Bank Building (1902), the Thompson-Ruby Building (1900), Highland House (1890), the State Music Hall (1922), the Exchange Hotel (1891), the Galltin Apartments (1929), the Gallatin Bank Building (1924), the federal building (1930), the Fayette County Courthouse (1892), the county building (1927), the Central School (1916), and St. Peter's Anglican Church (1884).
