= Truro Anglican Church (Fairfax, Virginia) =

Church in Virginia, US

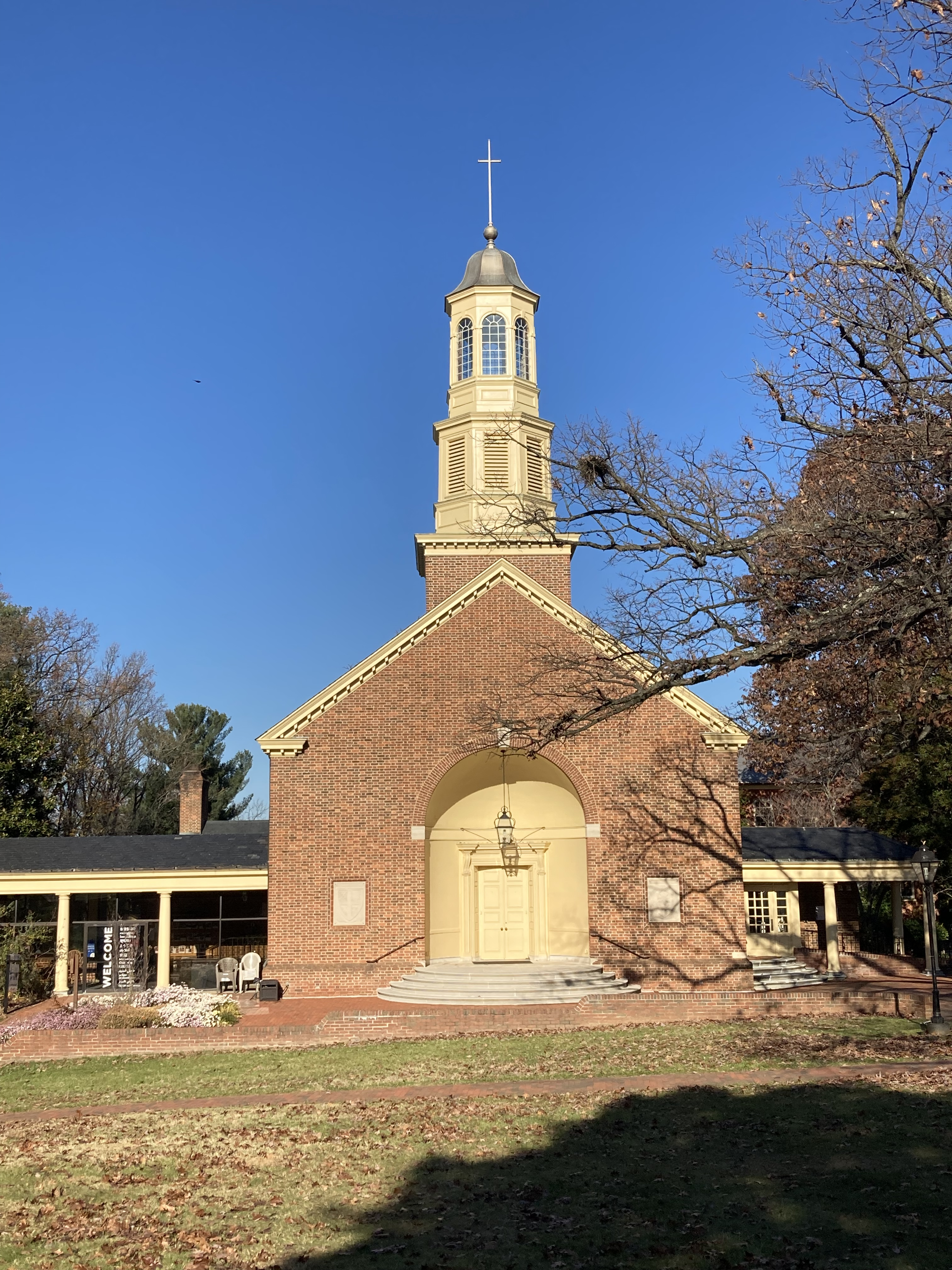
- Truro Anglican Church, Fairfax, Virginia

- Location within Northern Virginia Location within Virginia Location within the United States
- 38.8476°N 77.3088°W
- Location: 10520 Main Street, Fairfax, Virginia 22030 USA
- Country: United States
- Denomination: Anglican Church in North America

Administration
- Diocese: Diocese of the Mid-Atlantic

Clergy
- Priest: The Rev. Jamie Brown

Truro Anglican Church is an Anglican church in Fairfax, Virginia, USA. Founded in the eighteenth century, the parish has played a significant role in the Anglican tradition in Northern Virginia. In 2006, the congregation voted to depart from The Episcopal Church amid longstanding theological and doctrinal disputes, including disagreements over the authority of Scripture, core Christian doctrines, and matters of church governance.

Following its departure, Truro participated in efforts to form a new Anglican province in North America and later became affiliated with the Anglican Church in North America (ACNA), which was formally established in 2009.

== History of Truro Church (1845-1948) ==
There was no official Episcopal Church in the City of Fairfax until the Rev. Richard Templeton Brown, rector of The Falls Church, organized a congregation in 1843. The congregation first met at the historic Fairfax Courthouse and then moved to the private home of Mrs. William Rumsey, a Baptist from New York. There were fourteen communicants. A year later, a plain white frame church was built on the present site of the Truro Chapel and was consecrated as Zion Church in 1845.

As Union troops advanced into Virginia at the outset of the Civil War, the congregation was forced to abandon Zion Church. During the Civil War, Zion Church was first used as a storehouse for munitions and then was destroyed. The house that is now the Gunnell House (at that time a private residence) was used as the Union headquarters by General Stoughton until 1863 when he was captured in the middle of the night by Confederate Captain John Mosby. Graffiti written by the officers stationed in the house was found on the walls in a closet on the third floor and is now on display at the Fairfax Museum.

In 1882, the house was purchased for use as a rectory. At that time it was half the size it is today and was enlarged to its present form in 1911. It served as the residence of the rector of the Episcopal Church in Fairfax until 1991 when it served first as a home for single mothers and their babies (NOEL House) and then as the offices for Truro Church. Presently, the Gunnell House is used as office and meeting space for the church.

At the close of the Civil War, the congregation of Zion Church re-formed and began to meet in the Fairfax Courthouse. Zion Church was rebuilt and consecrated in 1878.

Zion Church remained in active use from 1875 through 1933, when a new church (now the Chapel) was built to serve the growing congregation of 100 parishioners, under the leadership of the Rev. Herbert Donovan. Designed to replicate the old Payne's Church on Ox Road, the new church was consecrated on May 1, 1934, as Truro Episcopal Church. The old Zion Church building was used as the Parish Hall until it burned down in 1952.

== Truro Church (1948-2001) ==
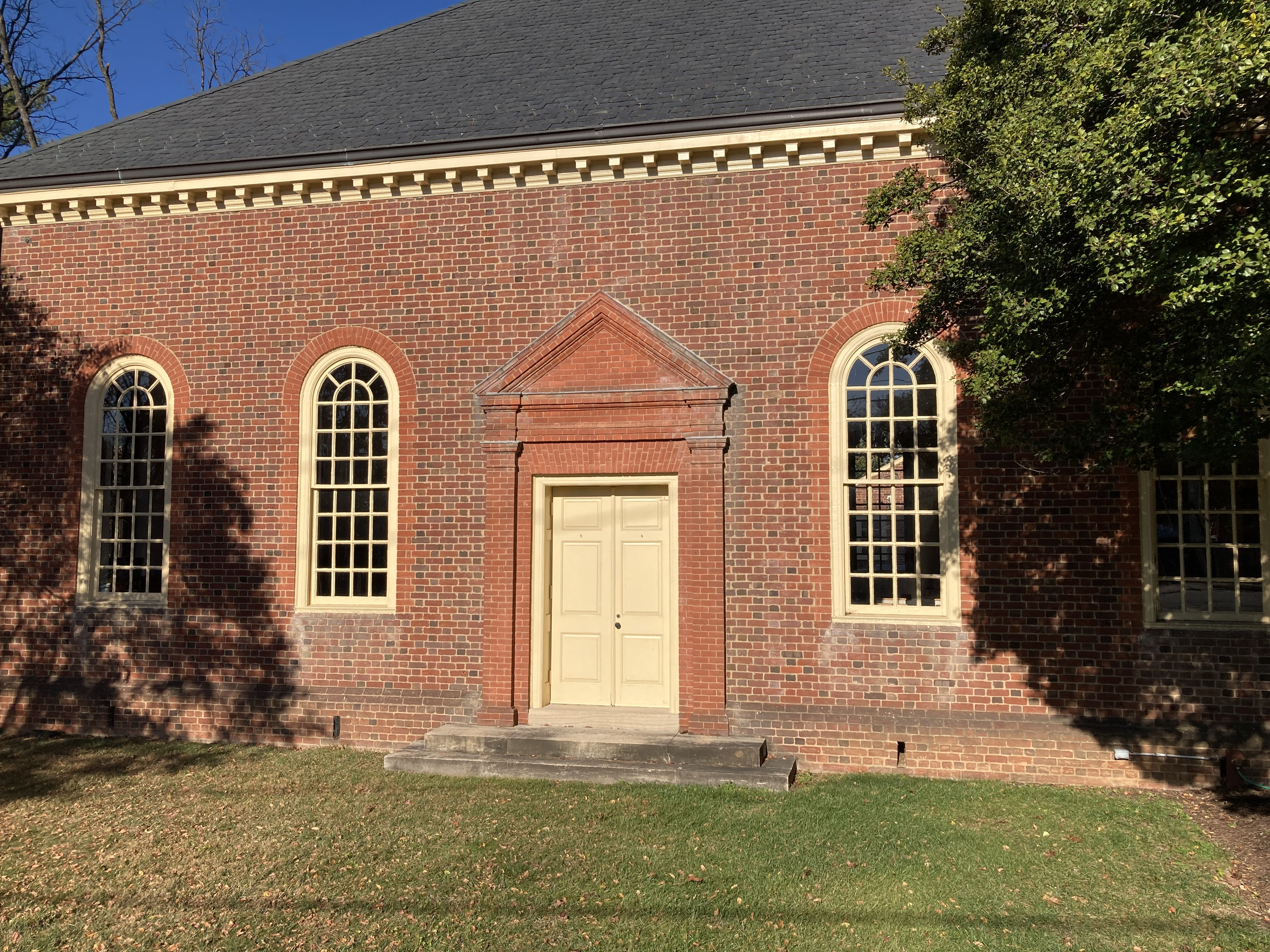
The historic sanctuary at Truro Church consecrated in 1933.

The Rev. Raymond Davis was installed as rector of Truro in 1948. He said that he would be pleased if he could, just once, fill all one hundred seats of the little brick church. Not only were all the seats filled, but the growing congregation began to burst at the seams as the great suburban expansion of Northern Virginia began in the 1950s. In 1959, a new and larger church was completed with a seating capacity of 500. The congregation first worshiped in the new church on Palm Sunday, 1959, and when the mortgage was paid off in 1974, a new Truro Church building was consecrated. The old church building is now known as the Chapel. Numerous services are still held throughout the week in the historic chapel, including contemporary worship services.

In 1967, a small group of Truro parishioners (who had been meeting together for Bible study and prayer) began a mission church called the Church of the Apostles, now located east of Truro on Pickett Road.

In 1976 the Rev. John W. Howe was installed as rector. Under his leadership Truro continued to experience physical expansion as well as spiritual renewal. The church seating capacity was expanded by 300 through the addition of the transepts in 1983. Truro also expanded its engagement in mission around the world. Another mission church, the Church of the Epiphany, was established in Herndon, Virginia in 1985, with the Rev. Bill Reardon as rector.

By the turn of the century, fewer than 40 percent of Truro's members had been raised as Episcopalian.

In 1991, the Rev. Martyn Minns was installed as rector of Truro Church. He emphasized an evangelical call to worldwide mission and outreach to the poor, as well as biblical theology. Under his leadership the Lamb Center was established, offering social services, prayer, and practical encouragement to the homeless in Fairfax, and the work of TIPS Truro's International Programs and Services was expanded. A new mission church, Christ the Redeemer Church, was launched in western Fairfax County with the Rev. Tom Herrick as vicar in 1994. Most recently, Truro birthed another mission church in Loudoun County, the Church of the Holy Spirit in 2001, with the Rev. Clancy Nixon as vicar. The Rev. Martyn Minns was made an honorary canon of All Saints' Cathedral, Mpwapwa, Tanzania in 2002; he was consecrated as a bishop by Archbishop Peter Akinola in 2006.

== 21st century ==
Following the Protocol for Departing Congregations created by the Diocese of Virginia, Truro Church embarked on 40 Days of Discernment to consider its future in the Episcopal Church (TEC). This time of discernment led to a parish vote where the entire membership voted on whether to leave the Episcopal Church because of the ordination of Bishop Gene Robinson, the first openly gay bishop in the Episcopal Church. On Sunday, December 17, 2006, 92 percent of the individual members of Truro Episcopal Church membership voted to withdraw from the Episcopal Church and join the Convocation of Anglicans in North America (CANA), a mission initiative of the Anglican Church of Nigeria (a province in the worldwide Anglican Communion), but an entity that is not a branch of the Episcopal Church, under the leadership of the Rt. Rev. Martyn Minns, Missionary Bishop of CANA. Joining Truro were other individuals from eleven other parishes in the Diocese of Virginia who also voted to leave the Episcopal Church and join CANA. CANA is a member of the Common Cause Partnership, which also includes the American Anglican Council, the Anglican Coalition in Canada, the Anglican Communion Network, the Anglican Essentials Canada, the Anglican Mission in America, the Anglican Network in Canada, the Anglican Province of America, Forward in Faith North America. and the Reformed Episcopal Church.

In 2007, the Rev. Tory Baucum became the new rector of Truro. In June of the following year, Truro was represented at the Global Anglican Future in Jerusalem. The leaving members of Truro initiated the first legal proceedings under a Virginia "departure" statute. Thereafter, TEC initiated legal proceedings in Virginia to determine the ownership of the facilities. Initially a Virginia Circuit Court judge agreed with CANA regarding technical points about whether the TEC was qualified to bring the action, and the case of real property ownership was not decided. TEC appealed, and on June 10, 2010, the Virginia Supreme Court overturned the decision of the circuit court, specifically finding that the Virginia statute on which the departing members relied did not apply because the departing members had not joined a "branch" of the same denomination.

In the midst of the proceedings on December 31, 2010, two of Truro's employees, including Truro's associate rector for pastoral care, the Rev. Marshall Brown, were fired from the church for repeatedly using church computers to access internet pornography. Bishop Martyn Minns, who knew Brown since they had attended seminary together in the 1970s, told The Washington Post that the church had arranged for Brown to receive treatment for an unspecified internet addiction in 2005, when Minns was Truro's rector. Truro's executive director told the Post that Brown was fired for accessing sites "that would be considered" pornography and that a subsequent IT sweep revealed a second computer with "a significant amount of pornography", leading to the second employee's termination. Afterward, the Fairfax County Police Department took possession of the computer and opened an investigation.

In 2012, the Circuit Court of Fairfax County decided the suit on remand, in combination with several other Northern Virginia TEC property splitting actions. Applying the neutral principles of law doctrine, the court upheld TEC's Constitution and Canons and ordered that CANA and the trustees of the withdrawn churches "promptly relinquish control over the properties to the [TEC] Diocese." Subsequently, an "unexpected" friendship between Rev. Tory Baucum of Truro Church and the Rev. Shannon Johnston, Bishop of the Diocese of Virginia, resulted in a situation in 2014 where "...the Episcopal Diocese of Virginia and Truro Church have settled their litigation and forged an amicable truce. However, Baucum's efforts were criticized by top ACNA leaders such as Archbishop Foley Beach, who wrote that Baucum's decision to reconcile with Johnston was "not in harmony with the Bible’s instruction in dealing with false teachers."

In 2020, The Washington Post reported that Truro's rector, Tory Baucum, had abruptly resigned and converted to Roman Catholicism in November 2019. According to the Post, tensions had arisen between Baucum and the staff of Truro due to their concerns with Baucum's workplace behavior, which prompted leaders in the church to write to Truro's vestry and bishop with concerns. In January 2020, an investigation commissioned by Truro concluded that the concerns expressed in the letter were accurate, according to Truro's vestry. In an email, Baucum apologized for the relational breakdown. After Baucum's departure, the Rev. Tim Mayfield, a pastor on Truro's staff, assumed Baucum's responsibilities as interim rector, and the parish established a "Recovery and Transition Team" to help Truro "become a more godly, healthier congregation." Later that year, two women at Truro reported that Mayfield had sexually harassed them four years prior. After an investigation concluded that the allegations were "credible", Mayfield resigned from his role, and the parish appointed Canon Mary Hays, a priest who had served on staff at Truro in the 1980s, as the new interim rector in 2021. The Rev. Jaime Brown, who was Truro's Director of Worship since 2014, became rector of Truro in September 2022.
