= Grace Anglican Church (Pittsburgh) =

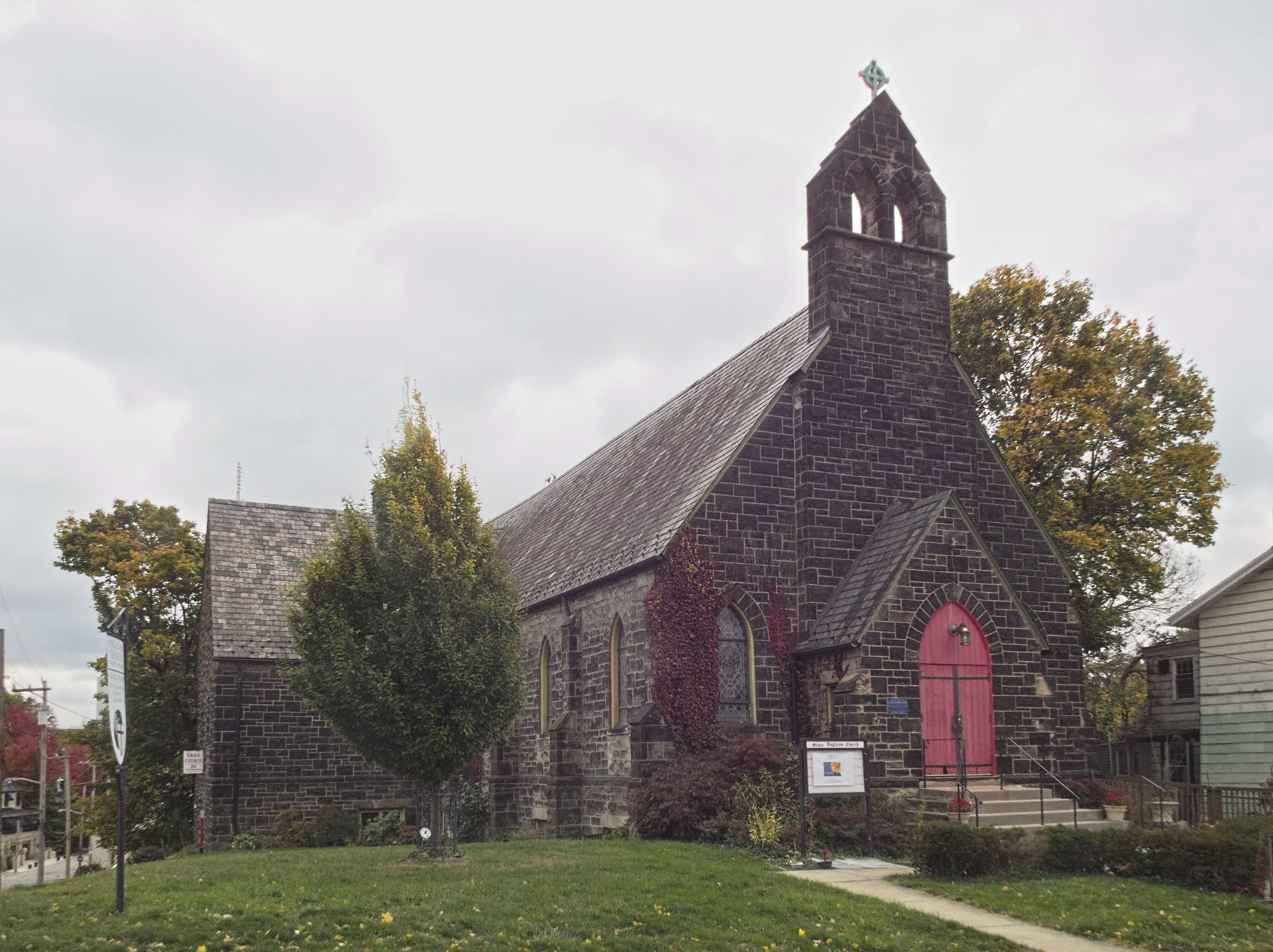
- Grace Anglican Church
- Location: Pittsburgh, Pennsylvania
- Country: United States
- Denomination: Anglican Church in North America
- Website: www.gracepgh.org

History
- Founded: 1851
- Dedicated: 1926

Administration
- Diocese: Pittsburgh

Clergy
- Rector: The Rev. Tyler J. Gongola
- Priest: The Rev. Canon John H. Park
- 40.43228°N 80.01140°W
- Location: 319 West Sycamore Street, Pittsburgh, Pennsylvania

History
- Built: 1926

Site notes
- Architect(s): J. Stewart, Jr.

Pittsburgh Landmark – PHLF
- Designated: 1971

Grace Anglican Church is an Anglican church in the Mount Washington neighborhood of Pittsburgh, Pennsylvania. Built in 1926, the Gothic Revival church has been listed since 1971 by the Pittsburgh History and Landmarks Foundation. The first Anglican church building on this site was erected in 1852.

The congregation holds services in the Anglo-Catholic tradition and is a member of the Anglican Diocese of Pittsburgh in the Anglican Church in North America.
