= William Gunnell House (Fairfax, Virginia) =

Historic house in Virginia, United States

- City of Fairfax Historic District William Gunnel House
- U.S. National Register of Historic Places
- U.S. Historic district – Contributing property
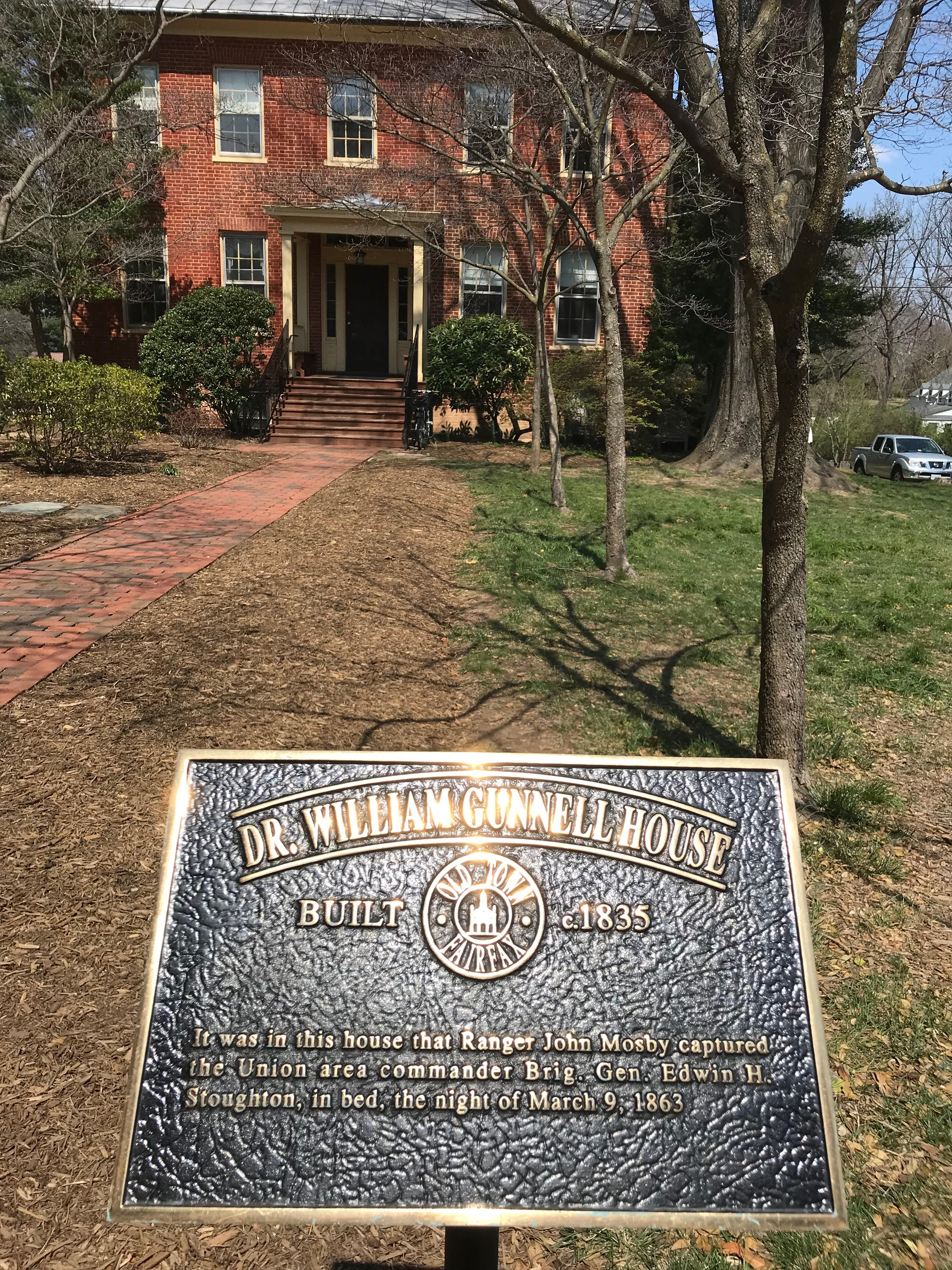
- Front view

- Location within Northern Virginia Location within Virginia Location within the United States
- Location: Jct. of VA 236 and VA 123, Fairfax, Virginia
- Coordinates: 38°50′52.4″N 77°18′30.8″W
- Area: 24 acres (9.7 ha)
- Architect: Multiple
- Architectural style: Late 19th And 20th Century Revivals, Queen Anne
- NRHP reference No.: 87001432
- Added to NRHP: August 27, 1987

Built in 1835, the William Gunnell House is a contributing property of the City of Fairfax Historic District. The building, at 10520 Main Street, was the location of Confederate John S. Mosby's raid on Union forces on March 9, 1863.

The William Gunnell House has been listed on the National Register of Historic Places since 1987. The house is currently a private residence used for administrative offices of the adjacent Truro Anglican Church. The interior has not been significantly modified since its construction.
