= Martyn Minns =

English-born American bishop

- Former Missionary Bishop of the Convocation of Anglicans in North America
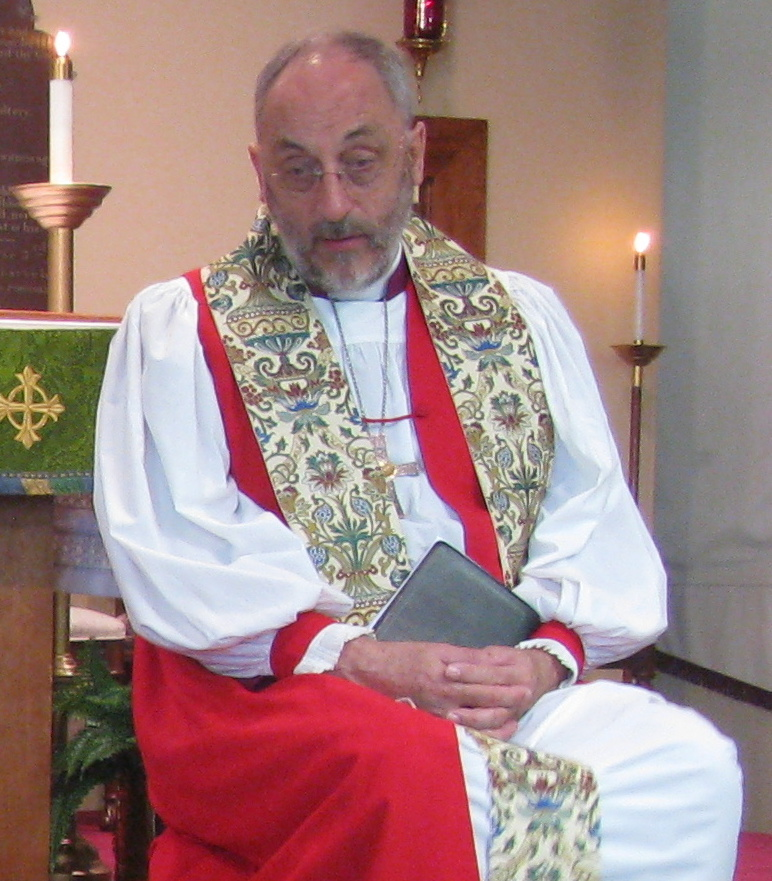
- Martyn Minns (2011)
- Church: Anglican Church in North America; Church of Nigeria
- Diocese: Convocation of Anglicans in North America
- In office: 2007–2014
- Predecessor: office created
- Successor: Julian Dobbs
- Other posts: Rector of Truro Church (1991–2006); Interim Bishop of Pittsburgh (2020-2022)

Orders
- Ordination: June 1979
- Consecration: 20 August 2006 by Peter Akinola

Personal details
- Born: April 16, 1943 (age 83) Nottingham, England
- Denomination: Anglicanism

Martyn Minns (born April 16, 1943) is an English-born American bishop, serving in the Anglican Church of Nigeria. He was the founding missionary bishop of the Convocation of Anglicans in North America (CANA), under the patronage of the Anglican Church of Nigeria, until his retirement in January 2014. Prior to becoming a bishop, he served as rector of Truro Church in Fairfax, Virginia, in the United States.

== Early life ==
Minns was raised in Nottingham, England. In 1964, he received a Bachelor of Science with honours in mathematics and statistics from Birmingham University in Birmingham, England. From 1967 until 1975, Minns was an executive for the Mobil Corporation in New York City.

== Clerical training ==
Minns received a Master of Divinity in 1978 from Virginia Theological Seminary in Alexandria, Virginia. He was ordained to the diaconate in June, 1978, and ordained to the priesthood in June, 1979.

== Departure from the Episcopal Church ==
From 1978 until 1982, he served as the associate rector of St. Paul's Church, Darien, Connecticut. From 1983 until 1988, he served as rector of the Church of the Holy Spirit in Lafayette, Louisiana. From 1988 until 1991, he served as rector of All Angels Church, New York City. In 1991, Minns was installed as rector of Truro Church in Fairfax, Virginia.

In reaction to the Episcopal Church appointing Gene Robinson, a homosexual priest, as the Bishop of New Hampshire, Minns led eleven Episcopal parishes in Virginia, including Truro, in leaving the denomination in 2006. The next year, he was named the head of the Convocation of Anglicans in North America, an association of conservative churches under the patronage of the Anglican Church of Nigeria. This decision led to the Episcopal Diocese of Virginia bringing a lawsuit against Truro, which lasted until 2012 and resulted in property rights being granted to the Diocese.

Minns was excluded from the invitation list to the 2008 Lambeth Conference.

Minns was made an Honorary Canon of All Saints Cathedral, Mpwapwa, Tanzania.

Minns retired as Missionary Bishop of CANA in January 2014 and was succeeded by the Rt. Rev. Julian Dobbs.

He come out of retirement to replace Jim Hobby as interim bishop of the Anglican Diocese of Pittsburgh in 2020.

== Personal life ==
He and his wife, the former Angela Rose Carlisle, are the parents of five children and have twelve grandchildren.

== Election and installation as bishop ==
Martyn Minns was elected to serve as the founding Missionary Bishop of CANA on June 28, 2006. He was consecrated a bishop on August 20, 2006 in Nigeria. He was installed on May 5, 2007 in Virginia.

Anglican Communion titles
New title	Missionary Bishop of CANA; 2007–2014	Succeeded by Julian Dobbs
Preceded by Jim Hobby	Bishop of Pittsburgh interim 2020–2022	Succeeded by Alex Cameron
