= Tory Baucum =

American priest

Personal details
- Denomination: Catholic
- Occupation: Benedictine peace activities
- Profession: Center for Family Life

Tory K. Baucum (born 1960, in Kansas) is the director of the Center for Family Life at Benedictine College in Atchison, Kansas.

Baucum was elected to the Polish Academy of Sciences in 2023, and appointed at the same time to the Copernicus Academy by Andrzej Duda, the president of Poland, in recognition of his work in peace and reconciliation, and in assistance with the refugee crisis.

== Career in ministry ==
=== Truro Church ===
Baucum served as pastor of Truro Church, an Anglican church in Virginia, from 2007 to 2019.

In 2006, the Truro Church left the Episcopal Church (TEC). This led to conflict and a long-running lawsuit over ownership of the church buildings and land. During his time at Truro, Baucum and Bishop Shannon Johnston of the Episcopal Diocese of Virginia settled the conflict with an agreement that the Truro congregation could remain in the historic building rent-free with a commitment to maintain the property. The intrareligious dialogue between Baucum and Johnston was highlighted in the Catholic Journal, Commonweal and at the New York Times.

In 2014, Baucum was named as one of the Six Preachers of Canterbury Cathedral by Archbishop Justin Welby.

Baucum, who was raised as a Quaker, resigned from his position at Truro Anglican Church in November 2019, following his conversion to Catholicism.

=== Conversion to Catholicism ===
Baucum served in various ministry and leadership roles in the Anglican church for roughly thirty years. He worked as a pastor, and as a seminary and university professor at Asbury Theological Seminary. Then, in 2019, he and his wife converted to the Catholic Church.

Baucum's conversion story was featured on the EWTN program "The Journey Home" in 2023.

=== Peace ministry ===
Baucum's primary focus in ministry is on what he refers to as peacebuilding, which ties domestic and family life, to life in the community, to the broader horizons of war and peace.

Baucum has cited the Reverend Eugene Rivers, Rabbi Marc Gopin and Bishop Shannon Johnston as influences. He has also cited Mistero Grand, an Italian marriage ministry, and its founder Don Renzo Bonetti as key influences.

Baucum participated in a reconciliation trip to Poland in 2022. The Polish government commended Gopin and Baucum and invited them to continue consulting and building up domestic church leaders to counteract the effects of Putin’s Christian Nationalist war on Ukraine.

In February 2023, Baucum was inducted to the Copernican Academy In Toruń, Poland.
