= Austin Pardue =

American bishop (1899–1981)

The Right Reverend Austin Pardue D.D., S.T.D., LL.D.
- Bishop of Pittsburgh
- Church: Episcopal Church
- Diocese: Pittsburgh
- Elected: October 19, 1943
- In office: 1944–1968
- Predecessor: Alexander Mann
- Successor: Robert Appleyard

Orders
- Ordination: April 21, 1925 by Charles P. Anderson
- Consecration: January 25, 1944 by Henry St. George Tucker

Personal details
- Born: August 9, 1899 Chicago, Illinois, United States
- Died: April 28, 1981 (aged 81) Pittsburgh, Pennsylvania, United States
- Denomination: Anglican
- Parents: Harry Austin Pardue & Jane Landers
- Spouse: Dorothy Klotz
- Children: 2

Harry Austin Pardue (August 9, 1899 – April 28, 1981) was the fourth bishop of the Episcopal Diocese of Pittsburgh. He served as diocesan bishop from 1944 to 1968. Although the Bishop never used the name during the many years of his ministry, his first name was actually "Harry". (Birth Certificate Records, Chicago, Cook County, Illinois.)

== Early life and education ==
Pardue was born on August 9, 1899, in Chicago, Illinois, the son of Harry Austin Pardue and Jane Landers. He was educated at Hobart College between 1918 and 1920 and graduated with a Bachelor of Arts in 1920. He then studied at Nashotah House and the General Theological Seminary, from where he graduated with a Bachelor of Divinity in 1925. In 1922 he became secretary of the Episcopal Young People's Movement. He earned a Doctor of Sacred Theology from Seabury-Western Theological Seminary in 1941, and was awarded the honorary degrees of Doctor of Divinity from Hobart College in 1940 and Doctor of Laws from the University of Pittsburgh. He married Dorothy Klotz on September 4, 1926, and together had two children.

== Ordained ministry ==
Pardue was ordained priest in 1925. He then became rector of Lawrence Hall for Boys and chaplain to city mission staff of the Diocese of Chicago, between 1925 and 1927. In 1926 also he became rector of St James' Church in Hibbing, Minnesota, while in 1929 rector of St Thomas' Church in Sioux City, Iowa. Between 1931 and 1938 he served as rector of Gethsemane Church in Minneapolis, Minnesota. In 1932 he was appointed Dean of St Paul's Cathedral in Buffalo, New York.

He also served as State chaplain for the Minnesota American Legion in 1927, chairman of the field department of the Diocese of Minnesota in 1932 and a member of the Standing Committee of diocese in 1933. He was also a member of the Diocesan Council and Examining Chaplains in 1933. he served as Deputy to the General Convention of the Episcopal Church of 1928 and 1935.

== Episcopacy ==
Pardue was elected Bishop of Pittsburgh on October 19, 1943, and was consecrated on January 25, 1944, by Presiding Bishop Henry St. George Tucker. He served as President of the Third province of Episcopal Church between 1968 and 1981. During his time as bishop he promoted ecumenism and was chairman of an Episcopal commission on relations with Orthodox churches. In 1951 he gave permission for the Ukrainian Orthodox Church to hold its convention at Trinity Cathedral in Pittsburgh. He retired on August 31, 1968.

== Bibliography ==
- Bold to Say (1940)
- Your Morale and How to Build It (1942)
- Life Out There (1943)
- He Lives (1946)
- Prayer Works (1949)
- Create and Make New (1952)
- New and Contrite Hearts (1953)
- Korean Adventure (1953)
- A Right Judgment in All Things (1954)
- The Single Eye (1957)
- The Eucharist and You (1963).
