= Alden Hathaway =

American Episcopal bishop (born 1933)

The Right Reverend Alden Hathaway B.Sc., B.D.
- Bishop in Residence
- Church: Episcopal Church (left 2012); Episcopal Diocese of South Carolina (2012-2017); Anglican Church in North America (since 2017)
- Diocese: Pittsburgh (1983-1997)
- In office: 1983–1997
- Predecessor: Robert Appleyard
- Successor: Robert Duncan
- Previous post: Coadjutor Bishop of Pittsburgh (1981-1983)

Orders
- Ordination: December 1962 by Nelson M. Burroughs
- Consecration: June 27, 1981 by John Allin

Personal details
- Born: August 13, 1933 (age 92) St. Louis, Missouri, U.S.
- Denomination: Anglican
- Parents: Earl Burton Hathaway & Margaret Moinet
- Spouse: Anna Harrison Cox
- Children: 3

Alden Moinet Hathaway (born August 13, 1933) is an American Episcopal and Anglican bishop. He served as the sixth bishop of the Episcopal Diocese of Pittsburgh, from 1983 to 1997. His time in office emphasized the role of his diocese as one of the most theologically conservative of the Episcopal Church. He has been a retired bishop of the Anglican Church in North America since 2017.

== Early life ==
Hathaway was born the first of three children to his parents, Earl and Margaret Hathaway, in St. Louis, Missouri. Earl Hathaway's career with the Firestone Tire Company took the family from St. Louis to Alton, Illinois, Detroit, Michigan, and finally to Akron, Ohio, where the family settled as his career progressed to president of the company, from 1965 to 1971.

Hathaway attended the Western Reserve Academy from 1949 to 1951 and Cornell University’s School of Agriculture from 1951 to 1955. After receiving his BS in agriculture studies, Hathaway attended Officer Candidate School and commissioned as an ensign in the US Navy, where he served on board the destroyer escort, USS McGinty, stationed in Pearl Harbor. He rose in the ranks to become lieutenant and the ship's gunnery officer before leaving the Navy in June 1959 with an honorable discharge.

== Marriage and children ==
While in Hawaii, he married Anna Harrison Cox on December 29, 1956, the first-born daughter of the dean of the cathedral of the Episcopal Diocese of Hawaii, the Rev. James Stanley Cox. The couple's first child was born on December 8, 1958, in Hawaii, a boy, Alden Moinet Hathaway, II.

== Seminary attendance and work in Ohio ==
In August 1959, the family relocated to Cambridge, Massachusetts, where he attended seminary at Episcopal Theological School, now called Episcopal Divinity School. A second son was born at May 26, 1961, Christopher Lee Hathaway. Hathaway graduated in 1961 with a Bachelor of Divinity degree and again relocated the family to Kenton, Ohio. Soon after his ordination, he attended to the spiritual needs of students as chaplain at Ohio Northern University, while simultaneously serving as rector of a church in Bellefontaine, Ohio. In 1965, Hathaway was appointed as one of five associates of Christ Church, Bloomfield Hills, Michigan, where he served until 1971. A third child was born, October 14, 1969, a girl, Melissa Ann Hathaway.

== Move to Virginia ==
The family relocated to Virginia in December 1971 as Hathaway took the post of rector for St. Christopher's Episcopal Church in the Diocese of Virginia, from 1971 to 1981. He was appointed to dean of the Region of Northern Virginia in 1977.

== In Pennsylvania ==
In 1981, Hathaway was elected bishop coadjutor of the Episcopal Diocese of Pittsburgh on the fifth ballot. He was consecrated as Bishop of Pittsburgh in 1983 and served until his retirement in 1997.

== Achievements ==
During his early years, 1962–1980, Hathaway established the Mental Health Clinic in Logan County, Ohio; served on the Michigan State Governor's Conference on Student Leadership and the advisory board for Planned Parenthood of Northern Virginia, and was an instructor of religion and ethics at Madeira School in Virginia.

In the midst of controversy surrounding the Vietnam War, he was challenged to heal the divisive wounds of a church in Springfield, Virginia. In the process, he was himself transformed and strengthened in his faith of God and successfully brought about the spiritual transformation of the parish that built a productive ministry of witness and outreach.

In the mid-1970s, Hathaway became involved with a group of conservative evangelical clergy and lay leaders in the establishment of Trinity Episcopal School for Ministry in Ambridge, Pennsylvania.

During his time as Bishop of Pittsburgh, from 1983 to 1997, he preached, taught and challenged a commitment to evangelical renewal of the congregations and a dedication by the diocese to the priority of new church planting. He was a proponent of the Episcopal Church "Decade for Evangelism (1990 - 2000). He was known for his preaching for evangelism and a personal relationship with Jesus Christ (https://digitalshowcase.oru.edu/narsc1987/34/). He encouraged the broad vision of a world embracing faith in ecumenical fellowship with other Christian bodies and vigorous working relationships with churches in lands beyond U.S. shores. He also began an annual ritual of taking groups to Israel on pilgrimage. He always remained an orthodox Anglican, upholding the sanctity of human life, from conception to death, and rejecting homosexual relationships as unnatural. He was succeeded by Robert Duncan.

== After retirement ==
Hathaway retired in 1997 and joined the staff of St. John's Episcopal Church, Tallahassee, in the Episcopal Diocese of Florida, serving as bishop until 2006 when the church split and two thirds started a new diocese that would later join the Anglican Church in North America in 2009. In 2007, Hathaway relocated to Beaufort, South Carolina, joining the staff of the Parish Church of St. Helena in the Diocese of South Carolina, where he remained after the diocese's withdrawal from the Episcopal Church, in 2012, and joining the Anglican Church in North America, in 2017. He is currently Bishop in Residence at the Parish Church of St. Helena.

In 1997, Hathaway founded Solar Light for Africa, Ltd. (SLA) and helped spawn a program that has provided electricity for over 2400 rural facilities in eight sub-Saharan countries. He has led nine of SLA's ten summer youth missions to East Africa.

He was a member of Communion Partners, an Episcopalian group which opposed the 77th General Episcopal Convention's decision to authorize the blessing of same-sex marriages in 2012. The measure to allow the blessing of same-sex unions was approved by the bi-cameral General Convention. In the House of Bishops, it received 111 "ayes", 41 "nays" votes and 3 abstentions.

== Sources ==
Anglican Communion titles
Preceded by Robert Appleyard	VI Bishop of Pittsburgh; 1983–1997	Succeeded by Robert Duncan
