= Anglican Diocese of Pittsburgh =

Anglican diocese in the United States

Location
- Ecclesiastical province: Anglican Church in North America

Statistics
- Parishes: 45 (2025)
- Members: 5,728 (2025)

Information
- Rite: Anglican

Current leadership
- Bishop: Alex Cameron

Website
- adpgh.org

The Anglican Diocese of Pittsburgh is a diocese of the Anglican Church in North America. It has parishes in the several counties of Western Pennsylvania. In addition, the diocese has oversight of several parishes that are not located within its geographical boundaries, including three in Illinois, two in Tennessee, and one in Colorado. The diocese also has a parish in Mexico.

The diocese is home to numerous Episcopal/Anglican organizations including Church Army USA, Rock the World Youth Mission Alliance, and the Society of Anglican Missionaries and Senders (formerly South American Mission Society). Perhaps the most prominent of these is Trinity Anglican Seminary, a leading evangelical, low church seminary in the Anglican tradition.

The diocese originated from the Episcopal Diocese of Pittsburgh, a diocese of the Episcopal Church. In 2008, the Episcopal Diocese of Pittsburgh split into two bodies when the majority of its parishes left the Episcopal Church to become the Anglican Diocese of Pittsburgh. The two dioceses have operated concurrently since, with the majority of parishes affiliated with the Anglican Diocese of Pittsburgh. However, the overall membership of the Episcopal Diocese of Pittsburgh continues to outnumber its Anglican counterpart, driven by its larger congregations concentrated in and around the City of Pittsburgh.

== History ==
=== Episcopal Church origins ===
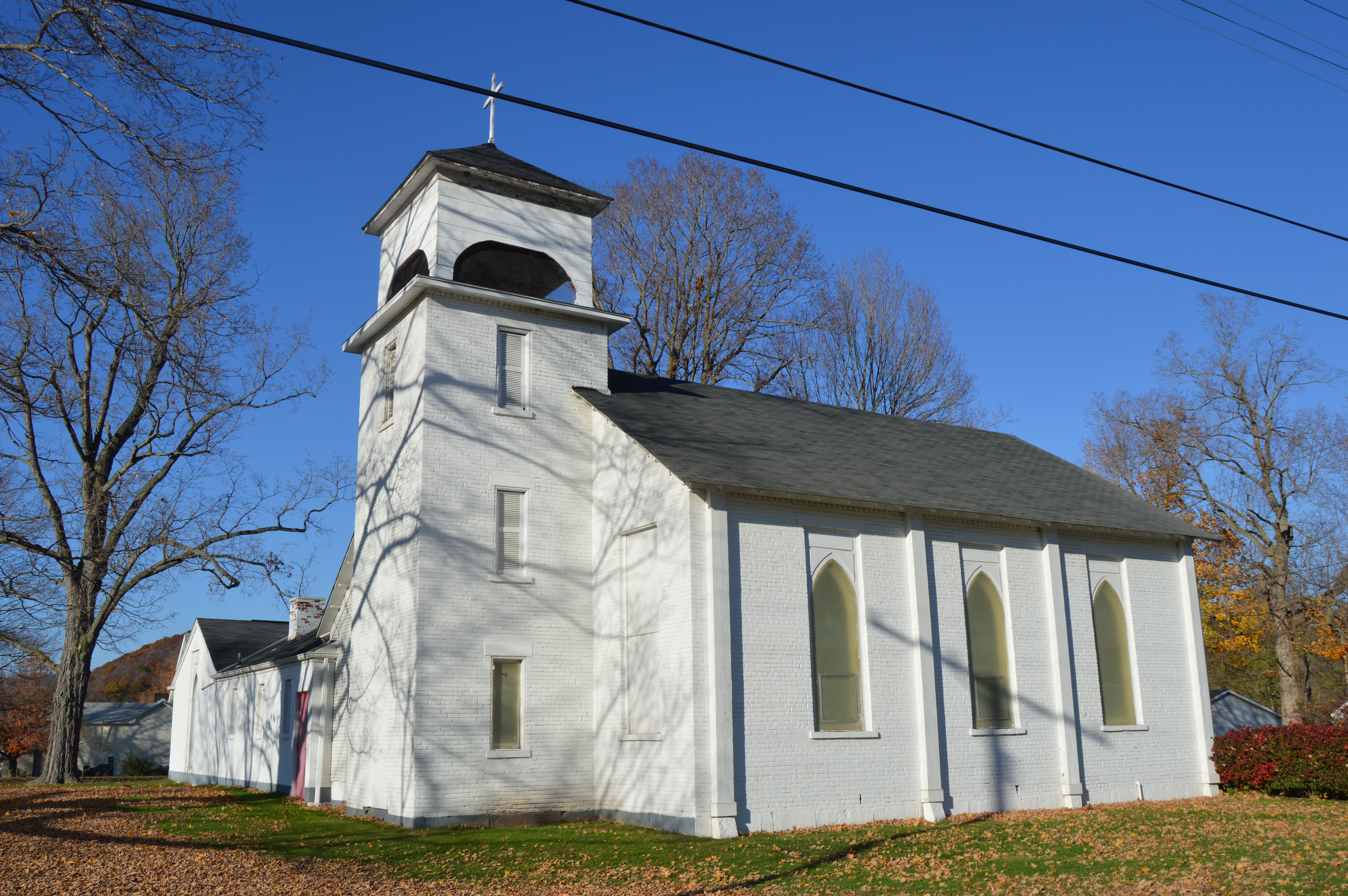
St. Luke's, the oldest parish in the diocese

The Anglican Diocese of Pittsburgh shares its history prior to 2008 with the Episcopal Diocese of Pittsburgh, which was established in 1865 from the western portion of the Episcopal Diocese of Pennsylvania. Anglicanism in western Pennsylvania began under a priest from Pittsburgh, a Rev. Mr. Taylor, who founded St. Luke's Church at Georgetown in 1814; it remains the diocese's oldest extant parish.

Beginning with the leadership of Bishop Alden Hathaway (1983–1997) and intensifying under his successor, Bishop Robert Duncan, the Episcopal Diocese of Pittsburgh had been a front line in the struggle between theological conservatives and liberals within the Episcopal Church. The theological struggles within the church escalated over the election of Gene Robinson as bishop of the Episcopal Diocese of New Hampshire and the Episcopal Church's first openly gay bishop (see Homosexuality and Anglicanism). Bishop Duncan in particular had taken up a prominent role in the conservative movement within the church.

On November 2, 2007, the convention of the Episcopal Diocese of Pittsburgh voted to amend its constitution and withdraw the diocese from the Episcopal Church. Constitutional changes require votes at two successive annual conventions. In October 2008, a majority of the diocesan convention voted a second time to leave the Episcopal Church and join the Anglican Province of the Southern Cone, a sister province of the Episcopal Church within the Anglican Communion. The Episcopal Diocese of Pittsburgh was the second diocese whose convention voted to leave the Episcopal Church in this fashion, after the Diocese of San Joaquin.

These actions were believed by the Episcopal Church to be ultra vires and null. While the majority of parishes approved of the decision to leave the Episcopal Church, a minority of parishes and members remained in the Episcopal Church and continued to claim that they were the legitimate Episcopal Diocese of Pittsburgh.

=== Post-realignment history ===
In 2009, the members of the diocese joined with other Anglican bodies to form the Anglican Church in North America. Bishop Duncan was elected in June 2009 as the inaugural archbishop and primate of the new church.

Both dioceses claimed to be the successor to the undivided diocese, and they both continued to use the same name until October 2009. At that time the Commonwealth Court ruled that all diocesan property belonged to the Episcopal Diocese of Pittsburgh that was part of the Episcopal Church. In January 2010 the court received a schedule of property including an investment portfolio of over $20 million and the deeds to 49 properties including 22 occupied by congregations participating in the Anglican Church of North America. In February 2011, the Commonwealth Court of Appeals affirmed the award of property and in March 2011 refused to reconsider its ruling.

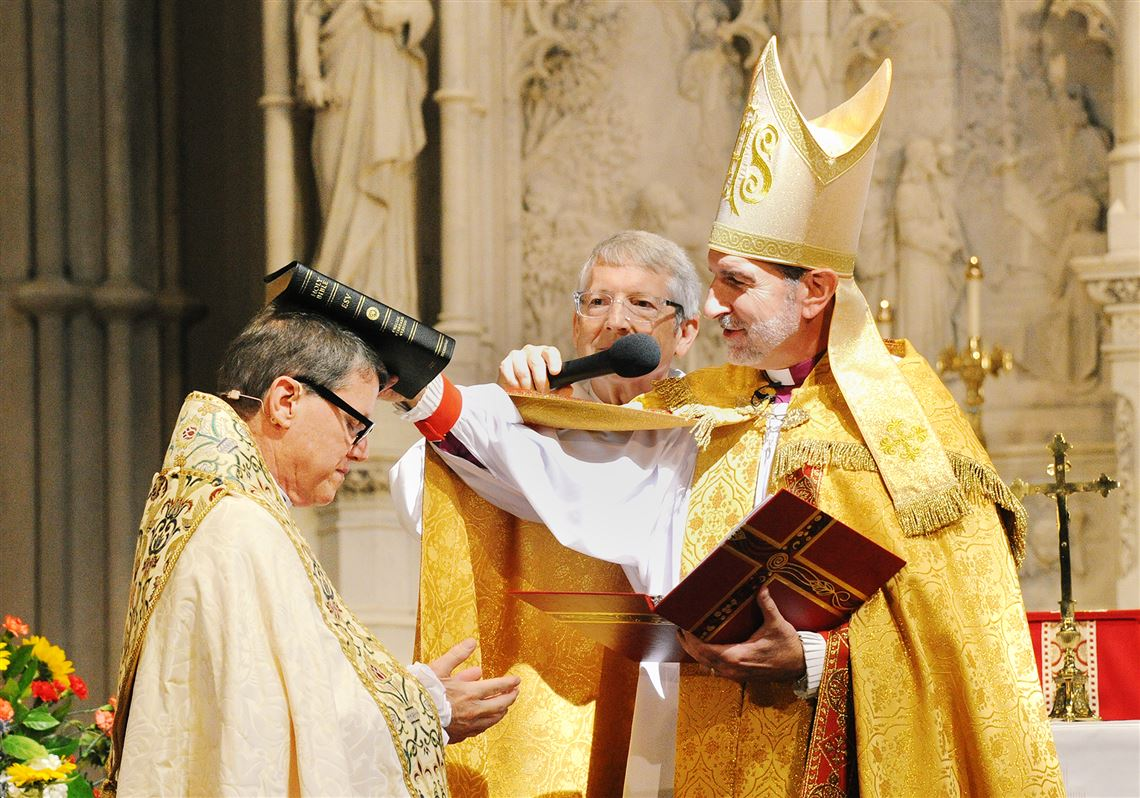
Archbishop Foley Beach presenting a Bible to Bishop Hobby at his consecration

The Special Convention of the Anglican Diocese of Pittsburgh elected Jim Hobby, rector of Trinity Anglican Church, in Thomasville, Georgia, to be their next bishop, in a meeting held at 22–23 April 2016, at St. Stephen's Church, Sewickley, Pennsylvania. The election was confirmed by the College of Bishops of the Anglican Church in North America at their meeting on 20–23 June 2016. [Hobby was elected among six candidates. Hobby was installed as the new bishop of the Anglican Diocese of Pittsburgh at St. Paul Cathedral in Pittsburgh, PA on September 10, 2016. Hobby resigned, upon request, on October 28, 2020, after what was described as "a careful review and assessment of his handling of a serious pastoral matter". He was replaced by Martyn Minns as interim bishop.

=== New Bishop ===
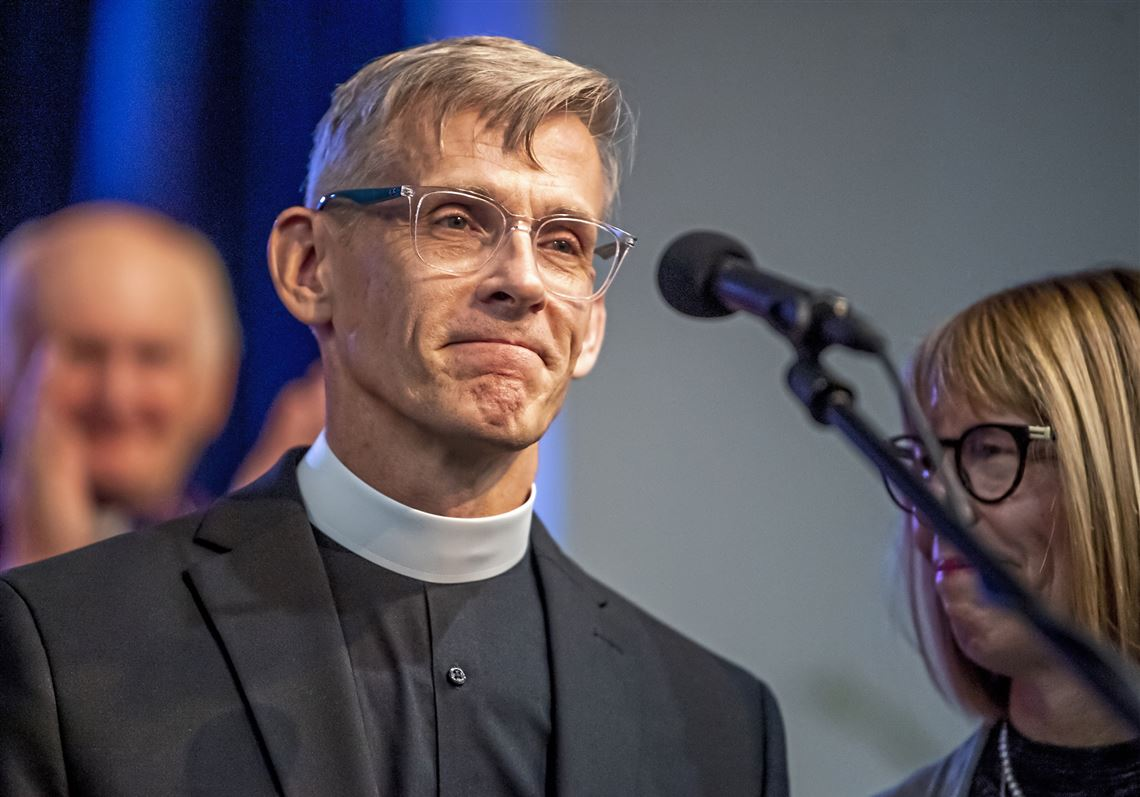
Bishop-Elect Cameron after his election

In May of 2021, the diocese launched a bishop search committee and began reviewing potential candidates for the office of bishop. On January 28, 2022, the committee announced their choices for three candidates: the Rev. Alex Cameron of Montréal, the Rev. Peter Frank of Chantilly, Virginia, and the Rev. Dr. Joel Scandrett, Associate Professor of Theology at Trinity School for Ministry in Ambridge, Pennsylvania. On April 30, 2022, the diocese held a special for the election at St. Stephen's Church in Sewickley. The candidates needed a simple majority from the clergy and laity to be named bishop-elect.

The results were as follows:

Alex Cameron - 65 clergy, 48 lay Peter Frank - 40 clergy, 27 lay Joel Scandrett - 12 clergy, 17 lay

Bishop-Elect Cameron was presented to the Anglican Church in North America's College of Bishops on June 13, 2022 and was consecrated on August 6, 2022.

== Bishops ==
Bishops prior to 2008 were bishops of the Episcopal Diocese of Pittsburgh.

7. Robert Duncan (1997–2016)
8. Jim Hobby (2016–2020)
• Martyn Minns (2020–2022), interim bishop
9. Alex Cameron (2022–present)

== Parishes ==
In 2025, the Diocese of Pittsburgh reported 45 congregations (two less than the previous year) with 9,306 members (up 9% from 2022) and 4,983 in average Sunday attendance (up 38% from 2022). Notable parishes in the diocese include:

Church	Image	City	Year founded	Year completed	Notes
Christ Church		Brownsville	1813	1857	U.S. historic district contributing property
St. Luke's Anglican Church		Georgetown	1814	1833	Oldest church building in the diocese
Christ's Church		Greensburg	1822	1891	U.S. historic district contributing property
St. Peter's Anglican Church		Butler	1824	1896	U.S. historic district contributing property
St. Peter's Anglican Church		Uniontown	1838	1885	U.S. historic district contributing property
Grace Anglican Church		Pittsburgh	1851	1926	Pittsburgh History and Landmarks Foundation Historic Landmark
Church of the Ascension		Pittsburgh	1889	1898	Pittsburgh History and Landmarks Foundation Historic Landmark; largest church in the diocese by attendance (2023)
Somerset Anglican Fellowship		Somerset	2008	1876	U.S. historic district contributing property
