= Robert Appleyard (bishop) =

American bishop (1917–1999)

The Right Reverend Robert Bracewell Appleyard D.D.
- Bishop of Pittsburgh
- Church: Episcopal Church
- Diocese: Pittsburgh
- Elected: November 14, 1967
- In office: 1968–1983
- Predecessor: Austin Pardue
- Successor: Alden Hathaway
- Previous post: Coadjutor Bishop of Pittsburgh (1968)

Orders
- Ordination: January 1947 by Angus Dun
- Consecration: February 10, 1968 by John E. Hines

Personal details
- Born: November 27, 1917 Jamestown, New York, United States
- Died: October 26, 1999 (age 81) Chester, Connecticut, United States
- Denomination: Anglican (prev. Methodist)
- Parents: Albert Edward Appleyard & Elizabeth Sharp
- Spouse: Katharine Louise Gelbach
- Children: The Rev. Jonathan Appleyard, the Rev. Daniel Appleyard, Jane Appleyard Roel, the Rev. Robert Bracewell Appleyard Jr.
- Occupation: Navy Chaplain, Methodist Minister, Episcopal Rector, Bishop of Pittsburgh, Assistant Bishop of Connecticut
- Profession: Clergyman
- Education: Allegheny College, Union Theological Seminary

Robert Bracewell Appleyard (November 27, 1917 – October 26, 1999) was bishop of the Episcopal Diocese of Pittsburgh from 1968 to 1983.

== Early life and education ==
Appleyard was born on November 27, 1917, in Jamestown, New York, son of Albert Edward Appleyard and Elizabeth Sharp. He was educated at the Jamestown High School before attending Allegheny College from where he graduated with a Bachelor of Arts in 1940. He then studied at the Union Theological Seminary, where he earned his Bachelor of Divinity in 1943. He married Katharine Louise Gelbach on September 12, 1942.

== Ordained ministry ==
Appleyard was ordained a Methodist minister in 1943 and then served as a chaplain in the United States Navy during WWII. In 1945 he became assistant dean of students at Union Theological Seminary and Director of the Program for Returning Serviceman, a post he retained till 1948. He decided to join the Episcopal Church while he was in Brisbane, Australia and was confirmed in New Guinea. He was ordained deacon in June 1946 and priest in January 1947 by the Bishop of Washington Angus Dun. In 1948 he became rector of Christ Church in Watertown, Connecticut, while in 1952 he became rector of Christ Church in Greenwich, Connecticut. Between 1965 and 1968 he served as rector of Bethesda-by-the-Sea in Palm Beach, Florida.

== Bishop ==
On November 14, 1967, Appleyard was elected Coadjutor Bishop of Pittsburgh on the second ballot during a special diocesan convention. He was consecrated bishop on February 10, 1968, with Presiding Bishop John E. Hines as chief consecrator in the Roman Catholic Cathedral of St Paul; Trinity Cathedral could not be used due to fire damage from the previous summer. He succeeded as diocesan bishop on September 1, 1968. Throughout his ministry he was prominently involved in the revision of the Book of Common Prayer, the ordination of women to the priesthood, the inclusion of gays and lesbians in the church and the increase of the involvement of lay people in the church. Appleyard retired in 1983 and was succeeded by Alden Hathaway. After retirement he became Bishop-in-Charge of the Convocation of Episcopal Parishes in Europe until 1986. He died of heart failure on October 26, 1999, in Chester, Connecticut.
