= USS McGinty =

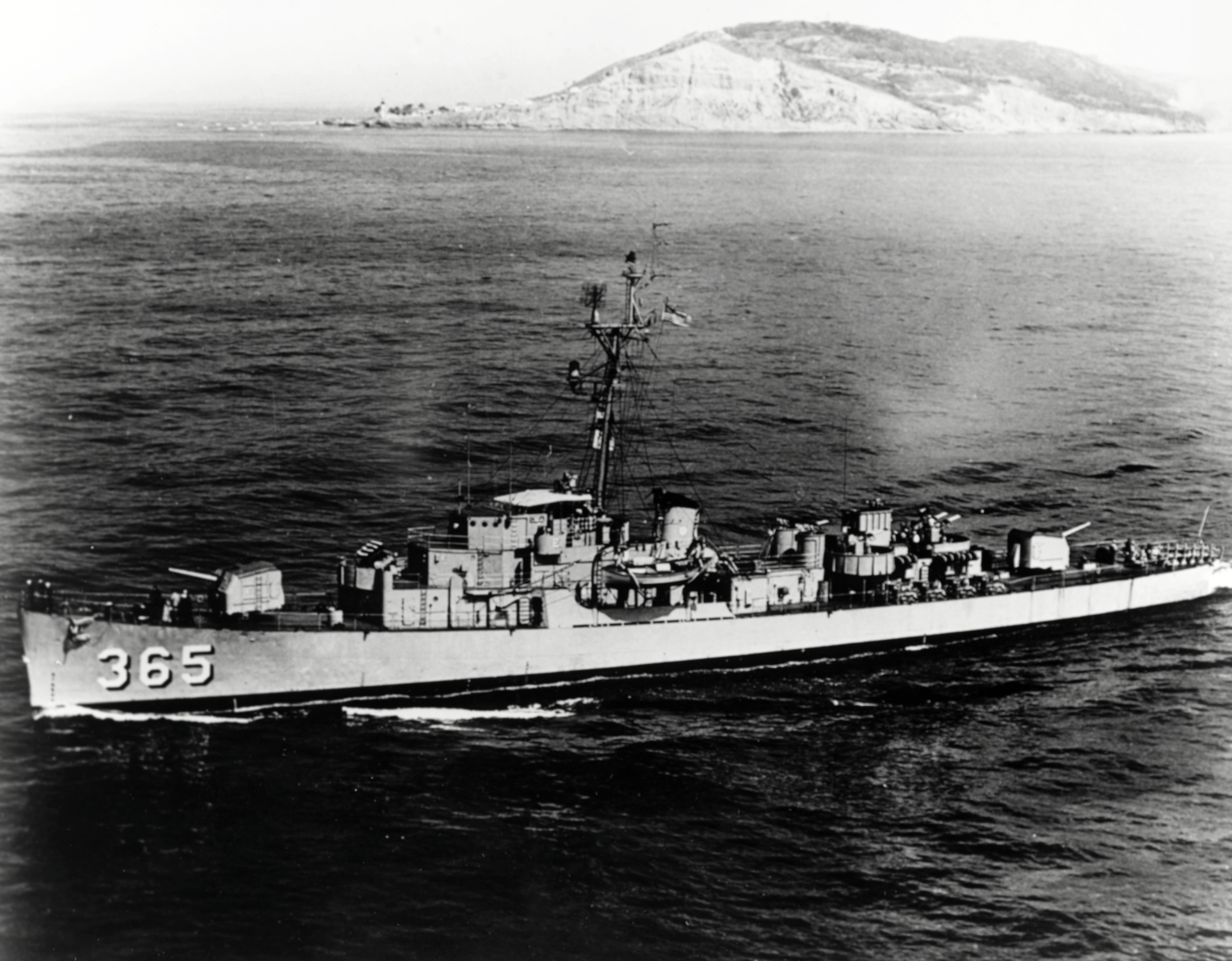
- USS McGinty (DE-365) underway off San Diego, California in 1959

History

United States
- Name: McGinty
- Namesake: Franklin Alexander McGinty
- Builder: Consolidated Steel Corporation, Orange, Texas
- Laid down: 3 May 1944
- Launched: 5 August 1944
- Commissioned: 25 September 1944
- Decommissioned: 15 January 1947
- Recommissioned: 28 March 1951
- Decommissioned: 23 September 1968
- Stricken: 23 September 1968
- Fate: Scrapped starting 1969

General characteristics
- Class & type: John C. Butler-class destroyer escort
- Displacement: 1,350 long tons (1,372 t)
- Length: 306 ft (93 m)
- Beam: 36 ft 8 in (11.18 m)
- Draft: 9 ft 5 in (2.87 m)
- Propulsion: 2 boilers, 2 geared turbine engines, 12,000 shp (8,900 kW); 2 propellers
- Speed: 24 kn (44 km/h)
- Range: 6,000 nmi (11,000 km) at 12 kn (22 km/h)
- Complement: 14 officers, 201 enlisted
- Armament: 2 × single 5 in (127 mm) guns; 2 × twin 40 mm (1.6 in) AA guns; 10 × single 20 mm (0.79 in) AA guns; 1 × triple 21 in (533 mm) torpedo tubes; 8 × depth charge throwers; 1 × Hedgehog ASW mortar; 2 × depth charge racks

USS McGinty (DE-365) was a John C. Butler-class destroyer escort of the United States Navy.

== Namesake ==
Franklin Alexander McGinty was born 22 November 1911 in Atlanta, Georgia. He enlisted in the United States Naval Reserve on 17 August 1942 and joined USS Plymouth on 1 January 1943 for duty as soundman third class. On 5 August the gunboat was hit by a torpedo as she prepared to depth charge U‑566 off Cape Charles, Virginia. Despite raging fires, McGinty entered the ship's magazine where he attempted to rescue a trapped shipmate. He, too, was trapped by the flames and was unable to escape before Plymouth sank. He was posthumously awarded the Navy Cross.

== Construction and commissioning ==
McGinty's keel was laid down by the Consolidated Steel Corporation of Orange, Texas on 3 May 1944. She was launched on 5 August 1944, sponsored by Mrs. Perrillah Atkinson Malone and commissioned at Orange on 25 September 1944.

== History ==
=== World War II ===
After a shakedown cruise off Bermuda and training along the US east coast, McGinty departed Norfolk, Virginia on 4 December 1944 for escort duty in the western Pacific. As flagship for Escort Division 86, she touched at San Diego, California, and Pearl Harbor, Hawaii before reaching Eniwetok on 16 January 1945. Later that day, she continued on to Guam as convoy escort duty. During the next 3 months, she escorted ships from Eniwetok to Guam and Ulithi. She completed three round trips between Eniwetok and Guam and two between Eniwetok and Ulithi, escorting tankers, transports, escort carriers, and merchant ships.

McGinty arrived at Ulithi on 27 April and served there as patrol ship until 15 June. After a run to Guam and back, she sailed in convoy for Okinawa, Japan on 1 July. She returned to Ulithi via Saipan on 12th, and completed a similar run to the Palau Islands and back on 23 July. She departed on a second Okinawa run on 4 August and returned to Ulithi on V-J Day. Thence, between 22 and 26 August, she sailed to Okinawa for duty with the 3rd Fleet.

On 9 September, McGinty sailed in the screen of a minesweeping and evacuation force bound for Japan. She arrived in Wakayama, Honshū, on the 11th and supported the evacuation of POWs before sailing for Okinawa on 18 September. She returned to Wakayama a week later and resumed her support of occupation operations along the Honshū coast. During the next two months, she escorted ships between the Inland Sea and Tokyo Bay, served as a harbor entrance control ship in the swept channel of Bungo Suido, and made courier runs out of Wakayama. Departing Japan on 2 January 1946, McGinty sailed via Eniwetok and Pearl Harbor to San Francisco, California, where she arrived on 22 January. She steamed to San Diego 23 and 24 March, was decommissioned there on 15 January 1947, and was berthed in the San Diego Group, Pacific Reserve Fleet.

=== Korean War ===
Following the outbreak of Communist aggression in South Korea, McGinty was recommissioned at San Diego on 28 March 1951. She carried out intensive training along the west coast and at Pearl Harbor. Then, as flagship of Escort Squadron 11, she sailed east on 29 October. Arriving in Korean waters on 21 November, she began blockade and patrol duty in Wonsan Harbor and in a naval-gunfire role, conducted numerous shore bombardments of Communist-held positions. She returned to Japan in mid-December, and joined the 7th Fleet patrols of the Straits of Formosa on 6 January 1952. She returned to the east coast of the war-torn Korean Peninsula, and between 5 March and 29 April, she carried out two more blockade and bombardment deployments at Wonsan. She departed Japan on 15 May and returned to her home port at Pearl Harbor on 24 May.

During the next year, McGinty prepared for additional western Pacific duty. After arriving in Sasebo, Japan on 20 May 1953, she resumed patrol duty along the east coast of Korea and screened ships during at-sea replenishment operations. Following the cessation of hostilities, she continued peacekeeping patrols and took part in anti-submarine warfare exercises. Once done, she departed Korean waters.

=== Cold War ===
On 17 November 1954 McGinty sailed on her third Cold War deployment to the Far East. During the remainder of the year, she patrolled the Sea of Japan off Korea, and on 1 January 1955, she transferred this peacekeeping duty to ships of the Republic of Korea's Navy in a ceremony at Pusan. She continued to support "keeping the peace" missions of the 7th Fleet. In February 1955, she served in the screen for the Mobile Replenishment Group, which supported the 7th Fleet during the timely and successful evacuation of the Tachen Islands. This display of U.S. seapower permitted the removal of Chinese Nationalists from an untenable position on the coastal islands along the mainland of China, and was called "the most forthright U.S. action against communism since the Korean War".

McGinty returned to Pearl Harbor from the western Pacific on 23 May and conducted type and squadron operations from Pearl Harbor during the remainder of 1955. Between April and July 1956, she supported United States nuclear testing programs in the Marshall Islands, serving both as a survey and a search and rescue ship. She then returned to Pearl Harbor for duty in the Hawaiian area until 17 June 1957, when she sailed to rejoin the 7th Fleet. For more than four months, she ranged the western Pacific from the Marianas and the Philippines to Australia and Japan. She arrived back at Pearl Harbor on 5 November.

On 7 June 1958 McGinty began her fifth Far East deployment of the decade. While operating in the Marianas, she joined Escort Squadron 7 on 1 July. Between 15 September and 12 October, she patrolled the northern station of the Taiwan Strait with other ships of the 7th Fleet. This timely demonstration thwarted the possible Communist invasion of the Chinese Nationalist islands of Quemoy and Matsu.

McGinty steamed to Seattle, Washington from 3 to 9 January 1959. She was decommissioned at Portland, Oregon, on 19 September 1959 and was assigned to ResCortDiv 13. She was placed in service as a Group II selected reserve destroyer escort. Manned by a reserve crew, she performed vital training duty for Naval Reserves. In response to overt Communist pressures by East Germany against West Berlin, McGinty was mobilized by Presidential order on 25 August 1961, and recommissioned on 2 October 1961.

McGinty sailed to Pearl Harbor, and as flagship for Escort Squadron 7, trained in Hawaiian waters until departing for the western Pacific on 10 February 1962. She bolstered the peacekeeping efforts of the versatile 7th Fleet while cruising the Far East from the South China Sea to the Sea of Japan. She returned to Portland on 17 July, decommissioned on 1 August 1962, and resumed in service duty as a training ship for Naval Reserves.

Operating out of Portland, McGinty provided valuable service as a training ground to maintain the operational and combat readiness of reservists. In addition, she took part in summer training exercises in Hawaiian waters and along the west coast. While remaining ready to meet the threats to world peace from Communist aggression and subversion, she also responded promptly to the menace of natural disasters. During a flood which affected much of Oregon and portions of northern California in late December 1964, she provided material assistance to emergency teams and lifesaving missions in the stricken areas.

=== Decommissioning ===
McGinty was transferred to the Inactive Ship Maintenance Facility in Bremerton, Washington, on 23 September 1968. Her name was struck from the Navy List the same day, and she was sold for scrap on 27 October 1969.

== Honors ==
McGinty received three battle stars for her Korean War service.
