= Alexander Mann (bishop) =

American bishop

The Right Reverend Alexander Mann D.D., S.T.D., LL.D.
- Bishop of Pittsburgh
- Church: Episcopal Church
- Diocese: Pittsburgh
- Elected: November 15, 1922
- In office: 1923–1943
- Predecessor: Cortlandt Whitehead
- Successor: Austin Pardue

Orders
- Ordination: June 20, 1886 by Arthur Cleveland Coxe
- Consecration: January 25, 1923 by Cameron D. Mann

Personal details
- Born: February 2, 1860 Geneva, New York, United States
- Died: November 15, 1948 (aged 88) Geneva, New York, United States
- Denomination: Anglican
- Parents: Duncan Hammond Mann & Caroline Brother Schuyler
- Spouse: Nellie Gerrish Knapp
- Children: 4

Alexander Mann (December 2, 1860 - November 15, 1948) was bishop of the Episcopal Diocese of Pittsburgh, serving from 1923 to 1943.

== Family and early Life ==
Mann was born on December 2, 1860, in Geneva, New York, the son of the Reverend Duncan Cameron Mann and Caroline Brother Schuyler. His brother was Bishop Cameron D. Mann. His grandfather was a Scottish clergyman and his mother's brother, his uncle, was also a clergyman.

== Education ==
Mann studied at Hobart College and graduated with a Bachelor of Arts in 1881. He then studied at the General Theological Seminary from where he graduated in 1886 with a Bachelor of Sacred Theology. He was awarded a Doctor of Divinity from Hobart College in 1896 and a Doctor of Sacred Theology from Hobart College in 1900 and another from General Theological Seminary in 1923. He also gained a Doctor of Laws in 1923 from Kenyon College.

== Ordained ministry ==
Mann was ordained deacon on May 31, 1885, and a priest on June 20, 1886, both by the hands of Bishop Arthur Cleveland Coxe. He then became curate at St James' Church in Buffalo, New York, before becoming assistant at Grace Church in Orange, New Jersey in 1887. He became rector of the same church in 1900. From 1905 to 1923 he served as rector of Trinity Church in Boston.

== Bishop ==
Mann was elected bishop on four separate occasions, three of which he declined. He was first elected Bishop of Washington in 1906, then Suffragan bishop of Newark in 1915 and Bishop of Western New York in 1917. In 1922 he was elected Bishop of Pittsburgh which he accepted. He was consecrated on January 25, 1923, by his brother Cameron D. Mann. In 1928, he supported the modification of the Volstead Act to permit the sale of light wine and beer, maintaining that total prohibition cannot be upheld. He also called for the halt of the sale of scrap iron to Japan in 1938. On January 26, 1943, he announced his intention to resign from his post, eventually resigning on December 31, 1943.
