= Robert Duncan (bishop) =

American Anglican bishop

The Most Reverend Robert Duncan D.D.
- Archbishop of the Anglican Church in North America; Bishop of Pittsburgh
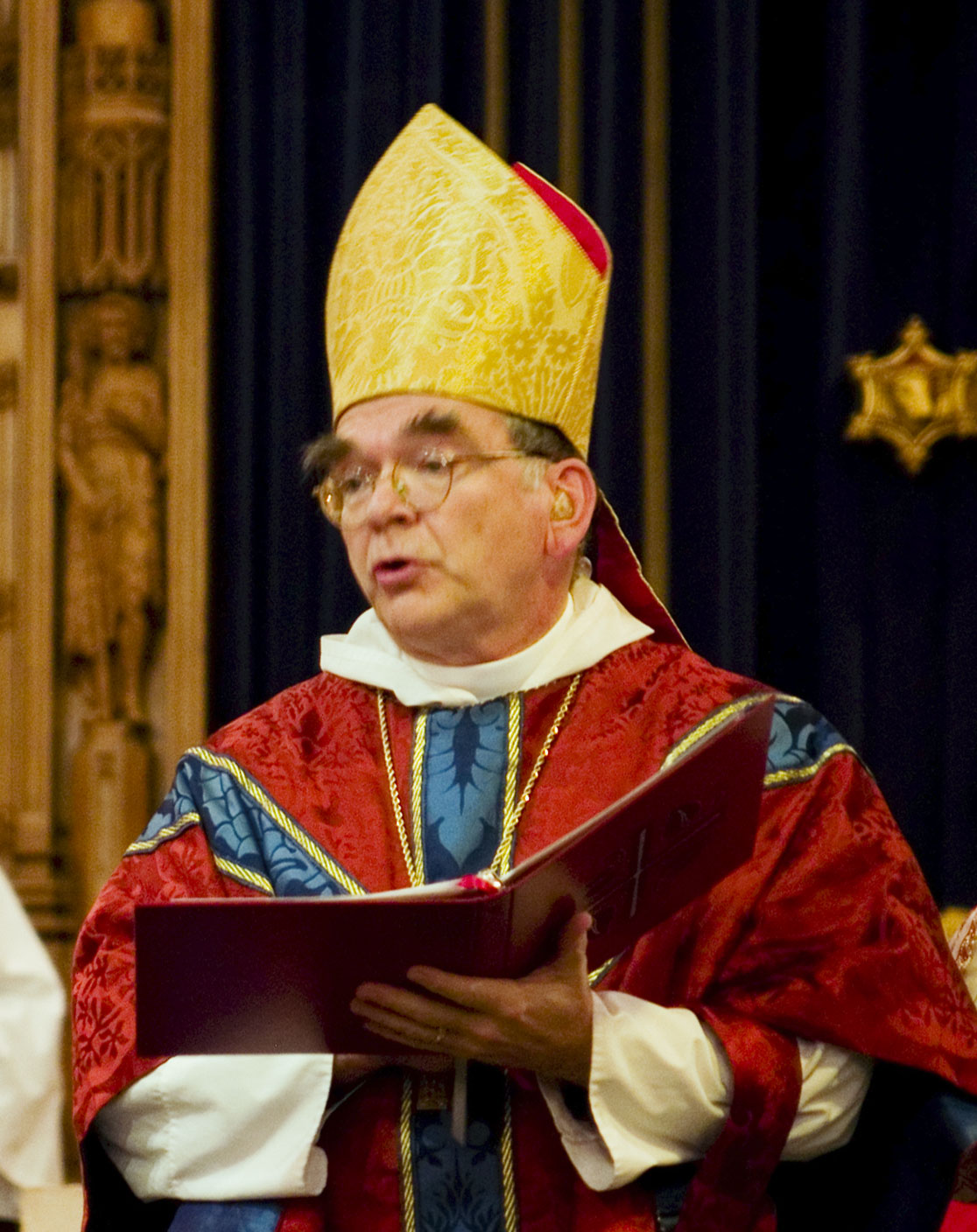
- Church: Anglican Church in North America
- See: Anglican Diocese of Pittsburgh
- Elected: 1995 (as bishop coadjutor of Pittsburgh)
- In office: 1997–2008: ECUSA, deposed; 2008: elected by Anglican Diocese of Pittsburgh; 2009: ACNA Primate; 2014–2016: Anglican Diocese of Pittsburgh-ACNA
- Predecessor: Alden Moinet Hathaway (ECUSA)
- Successor: Robert Johnson (ECUSA); Foley Beach (ACNA); Jim Hobby (Anglican Diocese of Pittsburgh-ACNA)
- Previous posts: Bishop of Pittsburgh (ECUSA and ACNA); Archbishop and Primate of the Anglican Church in North America

Orders
- Ordination: April 22, 1972 (deacon); October 28, 1973 (priest)
- Consecration: April 27, 1996 by Edmond L. Browning

Personal details
- Born: July 5, 1948 (age 78) Bordentown, New Jersey

Ordination history
History
Diaconal ordination
- Date: April 22, 1972
Priestly ordination
- Date: October 28, 1973
Episcopal consecration
- Consecrated by: Edmond L. Browning
- Date: April 27, 1996
- Place: St. Paul's Cathedral, Pittsburgh
Episcopal succession
Bishops consecrated by Robert Duncan as principal consecrator
- William Ilgenfritz: August 22, 2009
- Bill Thompson: October 31, 2009
- Trevor Walters: November 13, 2009
- Neil Lebhar: February 13, 2010
- Juan Alberto Morales: September 18, 2010
- Foley Beach: October 9, 2010
- Eric Menees: September 24, 2011
- Kevin Bond Allen: September 30, 2011
- Steve Wood: August 25, 2012
- Steve Breedlove: October 9, 2012
- Clark Lowenfield: April 20, 2013
- Stewart Ruch: September 28, 2013
- Peter Manto: December 6, 2013
- Mark Zimmerman: February 28, 2014
- Jim Hobby: September 10, 2016

Robert William Duncan (born July 5, 1948) is an American Anglican bishop. He was the first primate and archbishop of the Anglican Church in North America (ACNA) from June 2009 to June 2014. In 1997, he was elected bishop of the Episcopal Diocese of Pittsburgh. In 2008, a majority of the diocesan convention voted to leave the diocese and the Episcopal Church and, in October 2009, named their new church the Anglican Diocese of Pittsburgh. (The Episcopal Church continued to maintain its Diocese of Pittsburgh under new leadership.) Duncan served as bishop for the new Anglican diocese until September 10, 2016 upon the installation of his successor, Jim Hobby.

Duncan served as moderator of the Anglican Communion Network from 2003 to 2009 and chairman of the Common Cause Partnership from 2004 until the creation of the Anglican Church in North America. He has honorary doctorates from General Theological Seminary (1996) and Nashotah House (2006). At the time of Duncan's departure from the Episcopal Church, he was described as "probably the top conservative Episcopal bishop in America".

== Early life and ministry ==
Duncan was born in Bordentown, New Jersey, in 1948. His mother suffered from mental illness and he found refuge from the tumult of his family life in prayer and meditation at Christ Episcopal Church in Bordentown.

Duncan attended Bordentown Military Institute where he graduated valedictorian. He then entered Trinity College (A.B. cum laude) in Hartford, Connecticut. After graduating from Trinity in 1970, he enrolled at the General Theological Seminary of the Episcopal Church (M.Div., DD honoris causa) in New York. During his time at seminary, he also studied Scottish history at Edinburgh University.

Duncan was ordained as a deacon on April 22, 1972, and as a priest on October 28, 1973, the feast of Saints Simon and Jude. His first assignments were at the Chapel of the Intercession in New York City; at Grace Church in Merchantville, New Jersey; and a short period at Christ Church in Edinburgh. From 1974 to 1978, he served as assistant dean at the General Seminary. He spent the next four years in campus ministries at the University of North Carolina at Chapel Hill, serving as assistant rector for campus ministries at the Chapel of the Cross in Chapel Hill, North Carolina. In 1982, he was called to be rector of St. Thomas' parish in Newark, Delaware, where he served for 10 years.

== Election as bishop ==
Duncan was a candidate for Bishop of Colorado in 1990. In 1992, Alden M. Hathaway, then Bishop of Pittsburgh and a noted theological conservative, named Duncan his canon to the ordinary.

In 1995 Duncan was elected as bishop coadjutor of the diocese of Pittsburgh and succeeded Hathaway upon his retirement in 1997. Duncan was not among the nominating committee's candidates, but instead nominated from the floor of the convention, however, and was eventually elected. The Diocese of Pittsburgh was at that time considered by many in the Episcopal Church to be one of the most conservative and evangelical dioceses in the Episcopal Church. Duncan served on the program committee of the Network for Anglicans in Mission and Evangelism, an agency created at the 1998 Lambeth Conference.

== Conservative leadership ==
Duncan quickly became the head of a group of Episcopal leaders hoping to maintain conservatism within the denomination. When openly gay priest Gene Robinson was elected Bishop of New Hampshire, Duncan voiced strong opposition to the election. After Robinson's election was confirmed by the church's general convention on August 5, 2003, Duncan acted as spokesman for a group of conservative bishops and lay leaders at a press conference expressing disappointment at Robinson's election. Duncan denounced the election claiming that the Episcopal Church had "departed from the historic faith and order of the Church of Jesus Christ". Duncan and Robinson were members of the same GTS class, both having taken their MDiv degrees in 1973.

In January 2004, Duncan became the leader of the newly formed Network of Anglican Communion Dioceses and Parishes, a conservative action group whose stated mission was to allow "Episcopalians to remain in communion with the vast majority of the worldwide Anglican Communion who have declared either impaired or broken communion with the Episcopal Church (United States)."

At the March 17, 2005, meeting of Episcopal Church's House of Bishops, Duncan read a speech in which he admitted that the rift between the two sides may be "irreconcilable". In a possible sign of schism, St. Brendan's, a liberal parish in Franklin Park, Pennsylvania, announced in February 2005 that it no longer wished to be under Duncan's oversight.

In July 2007, Duncan made remarks criticizing Rowan Williams, the Archbishop of Canterbury, for inadequately supporting "orthodox" breakaways from ECUSA, declaring, "The cost is his office... To lose that historic office is a cost of such magnitude that God must be doing a new thing." The statement critical of the Anglican Communion's worldwide leader led Ephraim Radner to resign from the Anglican Communion Network, which he had assisted in founding, out of a concern that "Bishop Duncan has, in the end, decided to start a new church." Radner explained, "Bishop Duncan has now declared the See of Canterbury and the Lambeth Conference — two of the four Instruments of Communion within our tradition — to be 'lost'." At the request of Rowan Williams, Duncan attended the 2007 Primates' Meeting in Dar es Salaam, Tanzania.

== Deposition in the Episcopal Church ==
On January 15, 2008, the Title IV Review Committee of the Episcopal Church certified that, in its opinion, Duncan had "abandoned the Communion of this Church". Pending completion of this process, the three most senior bishops in the Episcopal Church had the option to inhibit Duncan from ministry but chose not to. In her letter to Duncan, the Presiding Bishop stated that she "would welcome a statement by you within the next two months providing evidence that you once more consider yourself fully subject to the doctrine, discipline and worship of this Church." Duncan replied by letter on March 14, 2008. In his response he denied all charges levelled against him.

On September 18, 2008, the House of Bishops voted that Duncan be deposed from ordained ministry on charges of "abandoning the communion of the Episcopal Church". Immediately following the vote, Duncan was named a bishop-at-large of the Anglican Province of the Southern Cone.

Following the vote in ECUSA's House of Bishops the Presiding Bishop, Katharine Jefferts Schori, formally deposed Duncan. In the sentence Jefferts Schori declared that "from and after 12:01 a.m., Saturday, 20 September 2008, Bishop Duncan shall be deprived of the right to exercise the gifts and spiritual authority of God's word and sacraments conferred at ordination in this Church and further declare[s] that all ecclesiastical and related secular offices held by Bishop Duncan shall be terminated and vacated at that time." The legal validity of the decree of deposition was questioned by Duncan's attorney.

Duncan was elected the bishop of the now Anglican Diocese of Pittsburgh 50 days after his deposition by the Episcopal Church.

== Primate of the Anglican Church in North America ==
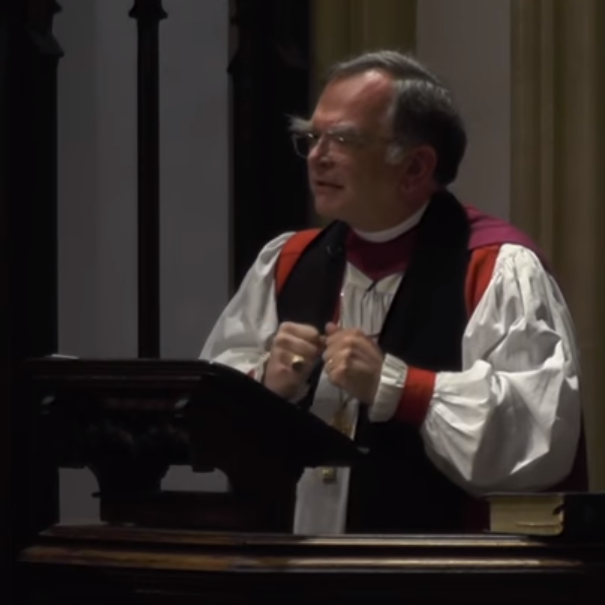
Duncan at Nashotah House in 2014

On June 21, 2009, the bishops of the Anglican Church in North America elected Duncan as the first archbishop and primate of North America. He was installed on June 25, 2009, at Christ Church in Plano, Texas. At the ceremony, conservative Anglicans in the developing world were represented by Benjamin Nzimbi, the archbishop of the African Anglican Province of Kenya. Kenya was one of nine provinces of the Anglican Communion that sent representatives to the ACNA conference. Duncan stated that his role as archbishop was to "reunite a significant portion of our Anglican Church family here in North America" and indicated that he intended to serve for five years before stepping down.

In October 2009, Duncan reacted to the Roman Catholic Church's proposed creation of personal ordinariates for disaffected traditionalist Anglicans by saying that although he felt that this provision would probably not be utilized by the great majority of ACNA's affiliated laity and clergy, he would happily bless those who were drawn to participate in this historic offer.

At the Provincial Council of the ACNA, held at Long Beach, California, on 21 June 2011, Duncan made a positive balance of the first two years of the church: "According to the data submitted in the Annual Parochial Reports there were, in the year 2010, 987 baptisms of adults over thirty, 424 baptisms of young people aged sixteen to thirty, and 1647 baptisms of children in the ACNA dioceses, not including the congregations of our Ministry Partners. What is so stunning about this data is that the number of baptisms of those 16 and older is almost equal to the number of children baptized. What this says is that we are reaching adolescents and adults who have never known Christ, never been part of a church. This is to reach North America with the transforming love of Jesus Christ, one sign among many that something quite extraordinary is unfolding."

Duncan was one of the signatories of the statement of the Christian Associates of Southwest Pennsylvania, an organization representing 26 denominations, on April 13, 2012, expressly supporting the Roman Catholic Church in its opposition to the HHS mandate that would force Roman Catholic hospitals in the United States to pay for birth control methods not in accordance with the doctrine of the church.

With Bishop Ray Sutton, Duncan attended a public audience in the Vatican at the invitation of Pope Benedict XVI, on 28 November 2012, whom they met and greeted afterwards on behalf of the Anglican Church in North America and the Fellowship of Confessing Anglicans.

He had a meeting of four hours and a half with the Archbishop of Canterbury, Justin Welby, in May 2013, at Welby's invitation. He was also one of the attendants of the GAFCON II, held in Nairobi, Kenya, from 21 to 26 October 2013.

== Afterwards ==
Duncan attended GAFCON III, held in Jerusalem, on 17–22 June 2018.

In September 2025, Duncan became embroiled in a conflict between the ACNA and the Jurisdiction of the Armed Forces and Chaplaincy (JAFC), the nonprofit arm overseeing chaplain endorsements in the ACNA. When the JAFC moved to formally disaffiliate from the denomination, Duncan wrote directly to the JAFC's Bishop, Derek Jones, with an ultimatum: "Instead of ending as a hero, you will be remembered as a scoundrel. Retire now. … End as one who shaped and led a great movement or be remembered as a villain."

== Other functions ==
Duncan holds a number of ecclesiastical and civic duties.

- Board member of Trinity School for Ministry in Ambridge, Pennsylvania, a notable conservative formerly Episcopalian seminary in the United States.
- Board member of Nashotah House Theological Seminary in Nashotah, Wisconsin, an Anglo-catholic Episcopalian seminary in the United States
- Board of Trustees member and sometime Vice President of the American Anglican Council 1996 to present.
- President of the Anglican Relief and Development Fund, a charity that reported funding projects worth $724,279 in 2007.
- He has hosted and coordinated many national and international conferences, including the Global Anglican Future Conference in Jerusalem.
- He served as president of the Christian Associates of Southwest Pennsylvania, an ecumenical organization that binds together Christians of various denominations.

== Notes ==
Anglican Communion titles
Preceded by Alden Hathaway	VII Bishop of Pittsburgh (TEC); 1997–2008	Succeeded by Kenneth Lester Price Jr. provisional Dorsey McConnell diocesan
Preceded by Alden Hathaway	VII Bishop of Pittsburgh (ACNA); 1997–2016	Succeeded by Jim Hobby
New title	Primate of the Anglican Church in North America; 2009–2014	Succeeded by Foley Beach
