= List of bishops of the Anglican Church in North America =

This list consists of the bishops in the Anglican Church in North America. The Global Anglican Future Conference of 2008 called for the establishment of the Anglican Church in North America. After the Church was organized and constituted in 2009, the GAFCON Primates Council recognized the Anglican Church in North America as a province of the Anglican Communion and invited Archbishop Robert Duncan to join the Primates Council. The leadership of the Anglican Global South has dealt with the reality of the Anglican Church in North America similarly, and the Anglican Church in North America is a member.

Key
Active bishop
Retired bishop
Deceased bishop

== Table of bishops ==
Bishop	Year Consecrated	Diocese/Jurisdiction	Notes
Leonard W. Riches	1975	X RE Northeast and Mid-Atlantic	Retired as bishop ordinary, 2008. Presiding Bishop, Reformed Episcopal Church, 1996–2014. Deceased 2024.
William C. Wantland	1980	IV Eau Claire – Fort Worth (asst.).	Retired.
C. FitzSimons Allison	1980	XII South Carolina (retired)	Retired.
Ronald Ferris	1981	IX Yukon – IX Algoma – Southern Cone – Canada (suffr.)	Retired.
Alden Hathaway	1981	VI Pittsburgh - South Carolina (retired)	Retired.
Alex D. Dickson	1983	I West Tennessee - South Carolina	Retired; deceased 2021.
Royal U. Grote, Jr.	1984	RE Northeast and Mid-Atlantic (asst.) – I RE Mid-America	Presiding Bishop, Reformed Episcopal Church, 2014-2016; deceased 2016.
Richard Boyce	1986	I RE West	Retired 2011, deceased 2020.
John-David Schofield	1988	IV San Joaquin	Retired 2011, deceased 2013.
Edward H. MacBurney	1988	VII Quincy	Retired 1994; translated to ACNA, 2009; deceased 2022
Andrew H. Fairfield	1989	X North Dakota – New England (asst.)	Retired 2007; translated to ACNA, 2009; deceased 2020
Terence Kelshaw	1989	VII Rio Grande	Retired 2004; translated to ACNA; deceased 2015.
John W. Howe	1990	III Central Florida - Diocese of the Mid-Atlantic	Retired 2012; translated to ACNA, 2020.
Peter H. Beckwith	1991	X Springfield – Great Lakes (asst.)	Retired 2010; translated to ACNA, 2014; deceased 2016.
Malcolm Harding	1992	V Brandon – Southern Cone – Canada (suffr.)	Retired. Deceased 2026.
Donald Harvey	1993	III Eastern Newfoundland and Labrador – Southern Cone – I Canada	Moderator, Anglican Network in Canada (2009-2014). Retired.
Jack Iker	1993	III Fort Worth	Retired 2019. Deceased 2024.
Terry Buckle	1993	Arctic (suffr.) – X Yukon – Canada (retired)	Metropolitan archbishop of British Columbia and Yukon, 2005-2010. Translated to ACNA, 2018. Retired, deceased 2020.
Keith Ackerman	1994	VIII Quincy	Retired 2010.
Richard W. Lipka	1995	CEC – All Saints (suffr.) – II All Saints	Retired 2025.
Charles Dorrington	1996	I RE Western Canada and Alaska – RE Mid-America (asst.)	
Daniel Morse	1996	I RE Central States	Retired.
Robert Duncan	1996	VII Pittsburgh	Archbishop, Anglican Church in North America, 2009–2014. Retired.
William J. Skilton	1996	South Carolina (suffr.)	Retired.
Daniel W. Herzog	1997	VIII Albany – Living Word (asst.)	Retired. Deceased, 2023.
Ray R. Sutton	1999	II RE Mid-America	Presiding Bishop, Reformed Episcopal Church, 2016-pres.
John Rodgers	2000	AMIA	Retired. Deceased, 2022.
David Bena	2000	Albany (suffr.) – CANA (suffr.) - Living Word (asst.)	Retired.
Thad Barnum	2001	AMIA – PEARUSA – Carolinas (asst.)	
T. J. Johnston	2001	AMIA – C4SO (asst.)	Retired.
Frank Lyons	2001	Bolivia – Pittsburgh (asst.) – South (asst.)	
William Anderson	2001	IX Caledonia - Canada (affiliated)	Retired.
David L. Hicks	2005	XI RE Northeast and Mid-Atlantic	Retired.
Martyn Minns	2006	CANA – Pittsburgh (interim)	Retired from CANA, 2014.
William Love	2006	IX Albany – Living Word (asst.)	
Bill Atwood	2007	Kenya – I International	Retired, 2024
William Murdoch	2007	Kenya – I New England	Retired.
John Guernsey	2007	Uganda (suffr.) – Diocese of the Holy Spirit – I Mid-Atlantic	Retired.
Roger Ames	2007	CANA (suffr.) – I Great Lakes	Retired.
David Anderson	2007	CANA (suffr.)	Retired.
Alphonza Gadsden	2007	VII RE Southeast	Retired; deceased 2025.
Terrell Glenn	2008	AMIA – PEARUSA – Western Gulf Coast (asst.) – Carolinas (asst.)	
John E. Miller III	2008	AMIA – I Gulf Atlantic (asst.) – Great Lakes (interim) – Upper Midwest (acting)	Retired.
Mark Lawrence	2008	XIV South Carolina	Admitted to ACNA College of Bishops, June 2017 Retired, 2022.
Wesley L. Nolden II	2009	UECNA (suffr.) – Reformed Episcopal Church – Quincy (asst.)	Retired, 2013
William Ilgenfritz	2009	I All Saints	First bishop consecrated in ACNA. Retired 2021. Deceased 2026.
Bill Thompson	2009	I Western Anglicans	Retired, 2014. Deceased, 2020.
William White	2009	VIII RE Southeast	Retired, 2022.
Stephen Leung	2009	Canada (suffr.)	
Charles Masters	2009	II Canada	Moderator, Anglican Network in Canada (2014-2022). Retired.
Trevor Walters	2009	Canada (suffr.)	Retired.
Todd Hunter	2009	AMIA – ACNA (asst.) – I C4SO	
Doc Loomis	2010	AMIA – Quincy (affiliated)	Retired upon merger of AMIA network into Anglican Diocese of the Great Lakes.
Neil Lebhar	2010	I Gulf Atlantic	Retired, 2022.
Foley Beach	2010	I South	Archbishop, Anglican Church in North America, 2014-2024.
Juan Alberto Morales	2010	IX Quincy	
Kevin Bond Allen	2011	I Cascadia	
Julian Dobbs	2011	CANA (suffr.) – I CANA East/Living Word	Overall Missionary Bishop of CANA, 2014 to 2019.
Felix Orji	2011	CANA (suffr.) – I All Nations	Dual membership at ACNA and Church of Nigeria College of Bishops ended, became solely a Church of Nigeria bishop, 23 May 2019. Returned to ACNA, October 2022.
Eric Menees	2011	V San Joaquin	
Winfield Mott	2011	II RE West – Missionary Diocese of All Saints	Retired.
Grant LeMarquand	2012	Diocese of Egypt with North Africa and the Horn of Africa / Area Bishop of the Horn of Africa (asst.) – Great Lakes (interim)	
Steve Wood	2012	I Carolinas	Archbishop, Anglican Church in North America, 2024–present.
R. Charles Gillin	2012	XII RE Northeast and Mid-Atlantic	Retired.
Steve Breedlove	2012	PEARUSA – I Christ Our Hope	Emeritus status, 2024.
Ken Ross	2013	I Rocky Mountains	
Quigg Lawrence	2013	Christ Our Hope (suffr.)	
Clark Lowenfield	2013	I Western Gulf Coast	
David Bryan	2013	PEARUSA – Carolinas (suffr.)	
Stewart Ruch	2013	I Upper Midwest	
Peter Manto	2013	II RE Central States	
Mark Zimmerman	2014	I Southwest – C4SO (asst.) – Western Anglicans (suffr.)	
Keith Andrews	2015	II Western Anglicans	Retired, 2025.
Gerry Schnackenberg	2015	AMiA	Retired. Joined ACNA 2024
Jim Hobby	2016	VIII Pittsburgh	Resigned 2020.
Walter Banek	2017	RE Mid-America (suffr.)	
Michael Williams	2018	Armed Forces and Chaplaincy (suffr.)	Retired 2025. Inhibited from ministry, January 2026.
Mark Nordstrom	2018	Armed Forces and Chaplaincy (suffr.)	Retired 2025. Inhibited from ministry, January 2026.
Andrew Williams	2019	II New England	
Ryan Reed	2019	IV Fort Worth	
Scott Seely	2020	All Nations (suffr.)	Consecrated by Church of Nigeria. Became resident in ACNA, October 2022.
Mark Engel	2021	III Great Lakes	
Steven Tighe	2021	II Southwest	
Alan J. Hawkins	2021	II Christ Our Hope	
Dan Gifford	2022	III Canada	
Chip Edgar	2022	XV South Carolina	
Alex Cameron	2022	IX Pittsburgh	
Willie J. Hill Jr.	2022	IX RE Southeast	
Alex Farmer	2022	II Gulf Atlantic	
Christopher Warner	2023	II Mid-Atlantic	
William A. Jenkins Sr.	2023	XIII RE Northeast and Mid-Atlantic	
Brian Wallace	2023	C4SO (suffr.)	
Paul Donison	2024	Christ Our Hope (asst.)	Consecrated by Church of Rwanda. Became resident in ACNA, January 2025; Assisting bishop for the Great Plains Missionary District; general secretary of GAFCON
Ben Fischer	2024	Rocky Mountains (suffr.)	
John Boonzaaijer	2024	RE Cuba (suffr.)	
Jacob Worley	2024	II Cascadia	
Allen Kannapell	2024	Great Lakes (suffr.)	
Charlie Camlin	2024	RE Mid-America (suffr.)	
Mike Stewart	2024	Canada (suffr.)	
Darryl Fitzwater	2024	III All Saints	
Phil Ashey	2025	III Western Anglicans	
Jason Grote	2025	III Central States	
Jay Cayangyang	2025	Armed Forces and Chaplaincy (suffr.) – II Armed Forces and Chaplaincy	Elected second bishop of the Special Jurisdiction, September 2025.
Marshall MacClellan	2025	Armed Forces and Chaplaincy (suffr.)	Inhibited from ministry, January 2026.
Marc Steele	2025	Living Word (suffr.)	
Jeff Bailey	2025	II C4SO	
Billy Waters	2026	Rocky Mountains (suffr.)	

== Former bishops ==
Bishop	Year Consecrated	Year Departed	Diocese/Jurisdiction	Notes
Chuck Murphy	2000	2010	AMiA	Status changed to "ministry partner" bishop in 2010; disaffiliated from ACNA, 2011; deceased 2018
David Bane	1997	2015	IX Southern Virginia – Southern Cone – Pittsburgh (asst.)	Retired 2006; translated to ACNA, 2009; returned to TEC, 2015.
George Fincke	1996	2015	RE Mid-America (asst.)	Transferred to Anglican Province of America, 2015. Deceased 2016.
Sam Seamans	2009	2015	UECNA (suffr.) – RE Mid-America (suffr.)	Joined the Antiochian Orthodox Christian Archdiocese of North America in November 2015
Amos Fagbamiye	2007	2019	CANA (suffr.) – I Trinity	Dual membership at ACNA and Church of Nigeria College of Bishops ended, became solely a Church of Nigeria bishop, 23 May 2019
Ronald Jackson	2016	2020	II Great Lakes	Retired, 2019. Deposed from ministry, 2020.
Todd Atkinson	2012	2024	Via Apostolica	Received into ACNA and conditionally reconsecrated, 2019. Deposed from ministry, 2024.
Derek Jones	2007	2025	CANA – I Armed Forces and Chaplaincy	Deposed from holy orders, 2026

== See also ==
- List of archbishops of the Anglican Church in North America
- Global Fellowship of Confessing Anglicans
- Anglican Church in North America
- List of bishops of the Reformed Episcopal Church

== Sources ==
- AnglicanChurch.net
