= Diocese of All Saints =

Diocese of All Saints may refer to:

- Diocese of All Saints' Cathedral in the Anglican Church of Kenya
- Diocese of All Saints (ACNA) in the Anglican Church in North America
