= All Saints Church (Amesbury, Massachusetts) =

Anglican cathedral and former Catholic church in Amesbury, Massachusetts

Coordinates: 42°51′23″N 70°56′04″W

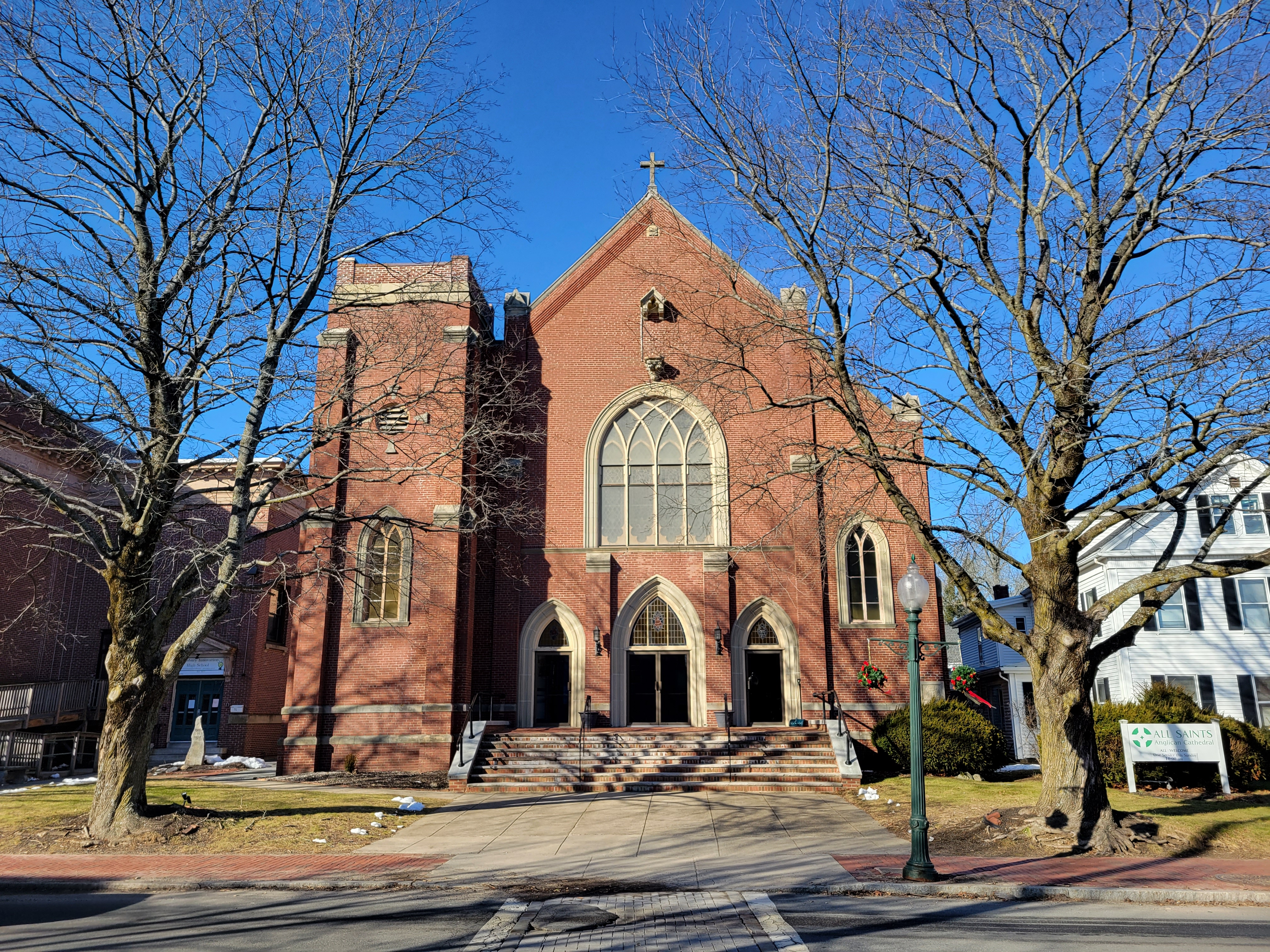
- All Saints Church
- All Saints Church
- Location: Amesbury, Massachusetts
- Country: United States
- Denomination: Anglican Church in North America
- Website: www.allsaintsamesbury.org

History
- Founded: 2007
- Founder: The Rt. Rev. William Murdoch
- Dedicated: 1928

Architecture
- Style: Gothic Revival

Administration
- Diocese: New England

Clergy
- Bishop: The Rt. Rev. Andrew Williams
- Rector: The Rev. Canon Ross Kimball (interim)

All Saints Church is an Anglican church in Amesbury, Massachusetts. Their mission is to "grow in the way of Jesus for the renewal of all things." Founded in 2007 as part of the Anglican realignment by a priest from an Episcopal church in nearby West Newbury, it serves today as the cathedral parish for the Anglican Diocese in New England. The church occupies an older Gothic Revival building that was formerly Sacred Heart Catholic Church in the Archdiocese of Boston.

== History ==
=== History of the building ===
Sacred Heart Church opened in 1903 as a French-speaking parish to serve a growing population of French-Canadian Catholics in Amesbury. The current building opened on Christmas Eve in 1928. The edifice is a masonry brick structure built in the Gothic style; the campus included a church nave with a 70-foot bell tower, a school and offices. In 1998, the Archdiocese of Boston consolidated Sacred Heart and the nearby Church of St. Joseph into a single parish, Holy Family. In September 2006, in light of rising insurance costs and settlements stemming from Catholic clergy sex abuse, the archdiocese decided to sell the Sacred Heart property.

=== Founding of All Saints ===
In July 2007, objecting to the consecration of Gene Robinson as bishop of New Hampshire, a symptom of the Episcopal Church's continuing departure from orthodox Scripture interpretation, the Rev. Bill Murdoch—rector of All Saints Episcopal Church in West Newburyport—left the Episcopal Church and was made a bishop in the Anglican Church of Kenya. Murdoch and a large number of the All Saints congregation also founded a new church, also named All Saints, in nearby Amesbury. In September 2007, the church plant purchased the building of Sacred Heart Catholic Church in Amesbury. "The Cardinal Archbishop of Boston, like so many ecumenical allies, moved heaven and earth (as they say) to make this place available for homeless Anglicans," ACNA Archbishop Robert Duncan later commented.

=== Designation as a cathedral ===
In 2009, Murdoch was elected the first bishop of the newly created Anglican Diocese in New England. He continued to serve concurrently as rector of All Saints, and in 2010, the church was designated the pro-cathedral of the diocese. Murdoch resigned as rector to focus on his episcopal role in 2012 and was succeeded by the Rev. Nathan Baxter in 2014 following the interim rectorate of the Rev. Canon Susan Skillen. In 2016, ADNE officially named All Saints its cathedral. Baxter was succeeded as rector by the Rev. Canon Justin Howard, a church planter from Bangor, Maine, in 2019. Rev. Howard was replaced by interim rector Rev. Canon Ross Kimball in May 2023.

=== Bell tower repairs ===
In the winter of 2019–2020, the bell tower's parapet partially collapsed inward due to water intrusion and cycles of freezing and thawing destabilizing the brick structure. Masons determined that the parapet could not be stabilized. All Saints raised $90,000 for restoration work, which was undertaken in 2022. The top 20 feet of the bell-less bell tower was removed down to a concrete cornice, and then rebuilt two feet up with a peer on each corner, recessed brick walls between the peers and a copper roof.

== Current status ==
=== Leadership ===
All Saints Church is currently being led by Interim Rector, Rev. Ross Kimball. ADNE supports the ordination of women to the priesthood. Ordained women on All Saints' staff includes the Rev. Canon Susan Skillen and Deacon Martha Learned. ADNE maintains its diocesan offices on the All Saints campus and the church plays a role in hosting numerous diocesan events.

=== Programs ===
All Saints' programs include a nine-month "discipleship residency" to help young adults discern their calling and grow in spiritual maturity. Eight fellows live on the All Saints campus and work in surrounding Amesbury.
