= Beth Moore =

American evangelical leader

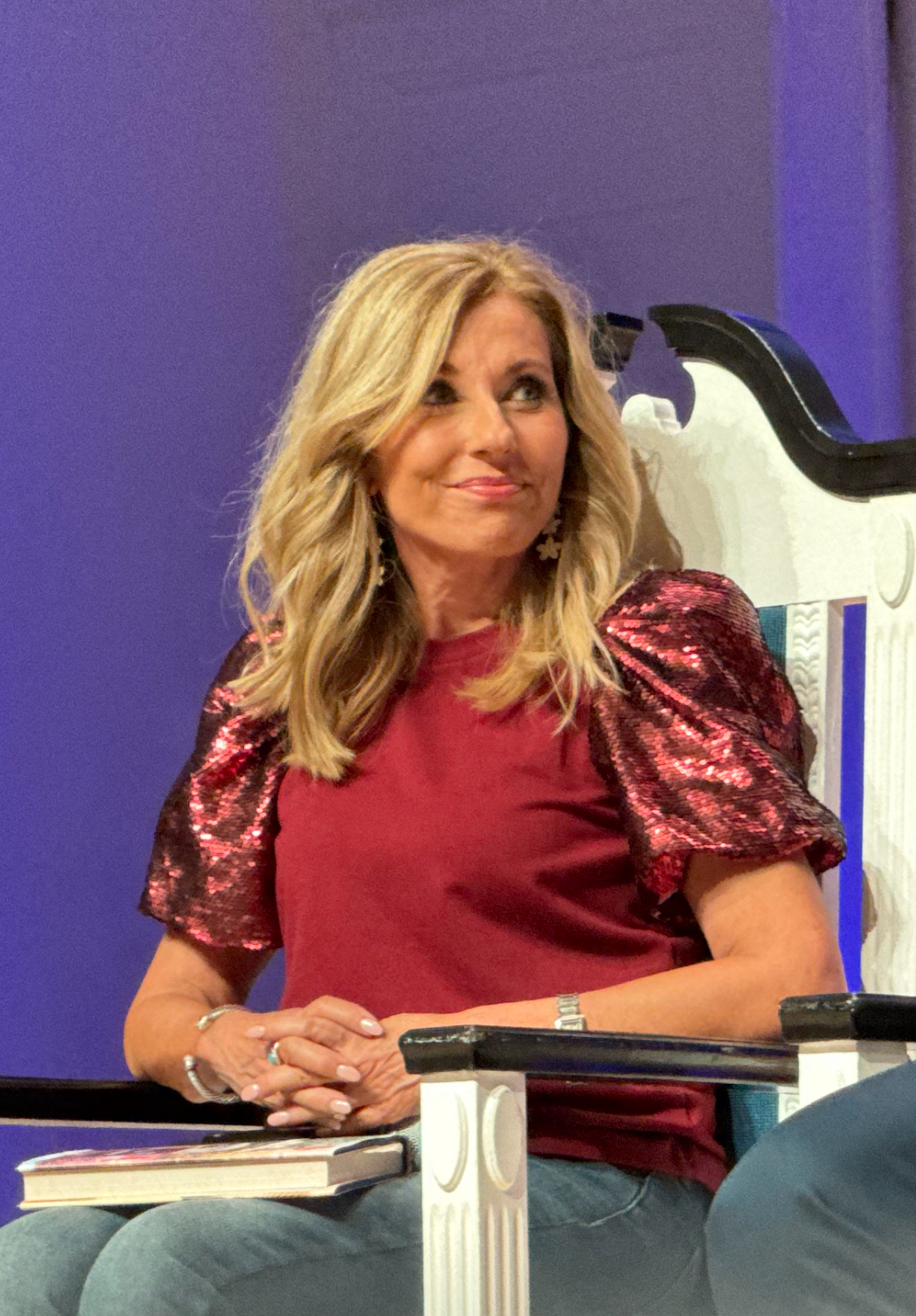
- Moore in 2023
- Born: Wanda Elizabeth Green; June 16, 1957 (age 69); Green Bay, Wisconsin, U.S.
- Education: B.A. Southwest Texas State University (political science)
- Occupations: Evangelist; author; Bible teacher
- Years active: 1978–present
- Title: Founder, Living Proof Ministries
- Spouse: Keith Moore (m. 1978–present)
- Children: 2

Wanda Elizabeth Moore (born Wanda Elizabeth Green, June 16, 1957) is an American Anglican evangelist, author, and Bible teacher. She is president of Living Proof Ministries, a Christian organization she founded in 1994 to teach women. Living Proof Ministries is based in Houston. Moore, who is said to be "arguably the most prominent white evangelical woman in America", speaks at arena events and has sold millions of books.

In conjunction with Lifeway Christian Resources, Living Proof Ministries conducted more than a dozen "Living Proof Live" conferences around the United States annually, with Travis Cottrell leading worship. From 2007 to 2011, Moore, Kay Arthur, and Priscilla Shirer collaborated on a LifeWay weekend conference known as "Deeper Still: The Event". While Living Proof Ministries no longer works in conjunction with Lifeway, Moore continues to teach through live events and a podcast/radio show called Living Proof with Beth Moore, as well as on her YouTube channel of the same name.

Moore continues to write books and produces video resources based on Bible studies that she conducts at the Living Proof Live conferences, although today they are published through Living Proof Ministries rather than Lifeway Christian Resources. She has taught at conferences for women in Ireland, England, Singapore, the Philippines, Puerto Rico, and India. Moore and her husband, Keith, joined the Anglican Church in North America in 2021.

== Early life and education ==
Born in Green Bay, Wisconsin, Beth Moore lived in Arkadelphia, Arkansas, where her father owned a cinema house. She is the fourth of five children, all of whom worked at the cinema from a young age.

Moore grew up in the Southern Baptist Church and regularly attended as a child three times each week. She has often referenced that church was a safe place for her as she was growing up and was the place where she could escape the sexual abuse she experienced at home. She earned a Bachelor of Arts degree in political science at Texas State University in San Marcos, where she pledged and was initiated into Chi Omega.

== Personal life ==
Moore and her husband, Keith, married in 1978. Keith grew up in a Catholic family, continued to work in his father's plumbing business. They have two daughters, Amanda and Melissa. Both daughters and a son-in-law, Curtis Jones, work with Beth at Living Proof Ministries. Beth Moore and her husband attend an Anglican church in Spring, Texas.

== Ministry ==
Moore committed her life to vocational Christian ministry at the age of 18. When she was volunteering as a Sunday school teacher, Moore realized she needed to learn more about the Bible. She went to a biblical doctrine class that gave her a deep yearning to know the Bible, and she began teaching a weekly Bible study class. By the mid-1990s that class had grown to 2,000 women, and she was speaking at churches throughout South Texas. Although she still had no formal theological education, LifeWay Christian Resources' publishing arm Broadman & Holman (later B&H) began publishing her Bible studies in 1994, leading to a national speaking ministry for Moore. With the help of a worship band she assembled, she began holding weekend conferences around the country. As a base for her national speaking ministry, she founded Living Proof Ministries.

In 2008, she held a simulcast of her "Living Proof Live" that is estimated to have been watched by 70,000 people at 715 locations. The sales of her book about Esther were credited as part of what made a "strong" quarter for Lifeway Christian Stores during the height of the Great Recession.

Moore then supported the Southern Baptist Convention’s complementarian theology which teaches that males and females have complementary roles and does not allow women to be pastors. Male SBC church leaders criticized her for speaking repeatedly on Sundays, which was in contradiction to their understanding of the Bible's position on the role of women in regards to teaching.

=== Leaving the Southern Baptist Convention ===
In March 2021, Moore announced that, though still a Baptist, she was no longer identified as a Southern Baptist and had ended her publishing relationship with LifeWay Christian. It was subsequently reported that Moore had joined the Anglican Church in North America. The news, along with photos of Moore vested as an acolyte and lector during an Anglican eucharistic service, triggered criticism from some Baptist ministers. In response, Bishop Clark Lowenfield of the Anglican Diocese of the Western Gulf Coast posted on Twitter: "As her Bishop, [i]t is an honor to serve God as Beth Moore’s spiritual oversight and covering. She is humble and grace-filled. And we pray for those who have been treating her in unChristianly ways over this past week."

== Political and social views ==
Moore does not identify as liberal or feminist and she is opposed to abortion. In August 2020, she said, "White supremacy has held tight in much of the church for so long because the racists outlasted the anti racists."

Moore criticized portions of the Evangelical movement which dismissed the moral flaws of politicians accused of sexual abuse, most prominently Donald Trump and Roy Moore (no relation). Moore said in a March 2021 interview that after the October 2016 release of the Access Hollywood tape, in which Donald Trump was heard making offensive comments about women, she was shocked that fellow evangelicals rallied around Trump and could not understand how he had become "the banner, the poster child for the great white hope of evangelicalism, the salvation of the church in America". In December 2020 she tweeted, "I'm 63 1/2 years old & I have never seen anything in these United States of America I found more astonishingly seductive and dangerous to the saints of God than Trumpism. This Christian nationalism is not of God. Move back from it."

=== Sexual abuse ===
Moore has said she was a victim of childhood sexual abuse in her home. After the MeToo movement and a report in her local newspaper which described 700 cases of sexual abuse within the Southern Baptist Convention, she became an advocate for sexual abuse survivors: sharing her story, listening to other survivors, and urging the church to examine crimes and coverups. She called out male church leaders for objectifying women and dismissing sexual abuse claims.

== Criticism ==
In 2019, at a conference, when John F. MacArthur was asked what he thought of Moore, he responded, "Go home." He supported his comment by saying that the Bible would not show an example of a woman preaching. In response, Pastor Wade Burleson said "Mr. MacArthur, I've lost respect for your ministry. Your smug response of 'Go home' when asked to comment on Beth Moore is not only misogynist, it's unscriptural, and contrary to the character of Christ."

== Works ==
- When Godly People Do Ungodly Things – book (2002), ISBN 978-0-8054-2465-2
- Believing God – book (2004), ISBN 978-0-80543189-6
- Who Will You Trust? – audio/video series (2007)
- Get Out Of That Pit – book (2007), ISBN 978-1-59145-552-3
- Songs of Deliverance – CD (2006)
- Fully Alive: Audio/video series with Beth Moore, James and Betty Robison (2006)
- So Long Insecurity: You've Been a Bad Friend to Us – book (2010), ISBN 978-1-4143-3472-1
- Get Out of That Pit: Straight Talk about God's Deliverance book (2017) ISBN 978-0-71809582-6
- The Undoing of Saint Silvanus book (2017) ISBN 978-1-49641648-3
- Chasing Vines: Finding Your Way to an Immensely Fruitful Life Bible study companion book (2020) ISBN 978-1-4964-4082-2
- All My Knotted-Up Life: A Memoir book (2023) ISBN 978-1-49647267-0

=== Bible studies ===
- To Live is Christ: The Life & Ministry of Paul (1997), ISBN 978-0767334129
- Living Beyond Yourself: Exploring the Fruit of the Spirit (1998), ISBN 978-0-767392754
- Breaking Free (1999)
- Jesus: The One and Only (2002), ISBN 0-8054-2489-X
- When Godly People Do Ungodly Things: Arming Yourself in the Age of Seduction (2002), ISBN 0-8054-2465-2
- The Beloved Disciple: Following John to the Heart of Jesus (2003), ISBN 0-8054-2753-8
- Believing God (2004), ISBN 0-8054-3189-6
- The Patriarchs: Encountering the God of Abraham, Isaac, and Jacob (2005), ISBN 0-633-09906-6
- Daniel: Lives of Integrity, words of prophecy (2006), ISBN 978-1-4158-2588-4
- A Woman's Heart: God's Dwelling Place (2007)
- Stepping Up: Psalms of Ascent (2007), ISBN 978-1415857434
- Esther: It's Tough Being a Woman (2008), ISBN 1-4158-5289-8
- Here and Now – There and Then: A Lecture Series on Revelation (2009)
- David: Seeking a Heart Like His (2010), ISBN 978-1-4158-6948-2
- James: Mercy Triumphs (2011), ISBN 978-1-4158-7171-3
- Children of the Day: 1 & 2 Thessalonians (2014), ISBN 978-1-43002860-4
- Living Free: Learning to Pray God's Word (2015), ISBN 978-1-43004330-0
- Entrusted - Bible Study Book: A Study of 2 Timothy (2016), ISBN 978-1-430055006
- The Quest: An Excursion Toward Intimacy with God (2017),ISBN 978-1462766611
- Delivered: Experiencing God's Power in Your Pain (2019) ISBN 978-1-40410924-7
- Chasing Vines: Finding Your Way to an Immensely Fruitful Life (2020) ISBN 9781496440884
- The Surpassing Value of Knowing Christ: A Study of Philippians (2022)
