= Diocese of the West =

Diocese of the West can refer to:

- The Anglican Diocese of All Nations, once part of the Church of Nigeria North American Mission under the name Anglican Diocese of the West and now a member of the Anglican Church in North America
- The former Reformed Episcopal Diocese of the West, now a convocation of the ACNA Missionary Diocese of All Saints
- The Orthodox Church in America Diocese of the West
- La Diócesis del Occidente (the Diocese of the West, also known as the Diocese of Western Mexico) in of the Anglican Church of Mexico
