= Grant LeMarquand =

Canadian Anglican bishop

The Right Reverend Grant R. LeMarquand
- Area Bishop of the Horn of Africa in the Anglican Diocese of Egypt
- Church: Episcopal Church in Jerusalem and the Middle East
- In office: 2012–2018
- Predecessor: Andrew Proud
- Successor: Kuan Kim Seng (as interim commissary bishop)
- Previous post: Professor of Biblical Studies at Trinity School for Ministry

Personal details
- Born: 1954 (age 71–72) Montreal
- Spouse: Wendy
- Children: 2
- Education: McGill University (BA (Hons), STM, MA); Montreal Diocesan Theological College/Montreal Institute for Ministry (DipMin); Wycliffe College, Toronto (Th.D., DD)

Ordination history
History
Diaconal ordination
- Ordained by: Reginald Hollis
Priestly ordination
- Ordained by: Reginald Hollis
Episcopal consecration
- Principal consecrator: Mouneer Anis
- Co-consecrators: Michael Lewis, Bill Musk, Ghais Malik

Grant LeMarquand (born 1954) is a Canadian Anglican bishop. He was assistant bishop in the Anglican Diocese of Egypt, serving as bishop in the Horn of Africa (Djibouti, Eritrea, Ethiopia and Somalia), for the Episcopal Church in Jerusalem and the Middle East, from 2012 to 2018. He was interim bishop of the Anglican Diocese of the Great Lakes, in the Anglican Church in North America, since March 2020 to February 2021.

== Early years ==
LeMarquand was born in Montreal and decided to dedicate his life to Christ as a teenager.

A graduate of McGill University (1977: B.A. Honours, Religious Studies; 1982: S.T.M.; 1998: M.A. New Testament, The Torn Veil in the Synoptic Gospels (M.A.). McGill University. 1988. (Directors, N.T. Wright, F. Wisse); Montreal Diocesan Theological College / Montreal Institute for Ministry (1983: Dip.Min.); Wycliffe College, Toronto (2002: Th.D. New Testament, Thesis: "An Issue of Relevance: A Comparative Study of the Story of the Bleeding Woman (Mk 5:25-34; Mt 9:20-22; Lk 8:43-48) in North Atlantic and African Contexts" (Director, Ann Jervis). In 2014 he was awarded the honorary degree of D.D. from Wycliffe College, Toronto. In 2015 he was granted the status of Emeritus Professor of Biblical Studies at Trinity School for Ministry in Ambridge, PA, USA.

== Academic appointments ==
His academic appointments include teaching New Testament and Systematic Theology at St. Paul's University, Limuru Kenya (1987–89); being Director of Extension Studies and lecturer in homiletics at Wycliffe College, Toronto (1993–98); and teaching Biblical Studies at Trinity School for Ministry, Ambridge, PA, USA (1998-2012), where he was also for a period the direction of Extension Ministries and for another time the Academic Dean.

He has also worked at Anglican and Episcopal History as International Editor.

In 2015 he was chosen as one of 38 IARCCUM (International Anglican-Roman Catholic Commission on Unity and Mission) bishops.

== Pastoral work ==
Pastorally, he was a lay worker at St. Stephen’s Anglican Church, Westmount, Quebec (1978–80), assistant curate, St. Barnabas’ Anglican Church, Pierrefonds, Quebec (1983–85), chaplain to McGill University and Christ Church Cathedral (Montreal) (1985–86), and assistant dean of students, Wycliffe College (1990–92). He has served as honorary assistant at several parishes including Little Trinity, Toronto, St Paul's on the Hill, Pickering, and Church of the Ascension, Pittsburgh. During his career he has been licensed in the dioceses of Montreal, Mt Kenya South, Toronto, Pittsburgh and Albany.

He was ordained deacon on May 13, 1983 and priest on May 22, 1984 both ceremonies led by the Rt Revd Reginald Hollis at Christ Church Cathedral in the Diocese of Montreal. He was consecrated as bishop on April 25, 2012 at All Saints' Cathedral in Cairo, Egypt by the Most Revd Dr Mouneer Anis, which he was until 2018.

He stepped down as Bishop of the Horn of Africa in summer 2017. He had spent six years in Ethiopia, with the Society of Anglican Missionaries and Senders (SAMS-USA).

After returning to the US, he took up a teaching post in Pennsylvania.

He took office as interim bishop of the Anglican Diocese of the Great Lakes, in the Anglican Church in North America, in March 2020, until the election of a new bishop.

In 2021, The Living Church reported that LeMarquand was the only bishop in the Anglican Church in North America to sign an open letter addressed "Dear Gay Anglicans", written in response to a pastoral statement from the ACNA's College of Bishops on sexuality. The letter stated: "We commit to take practical steps to become churches where gay Anglicans can share all of their story, find community, and seek support." The letter drew criticism from ACNA leadership, including Archbishop Foley Beach, who objected to its tone and timing. It was subsequently taken down from its original website following internal church discussions. When reached for a comment by The Living Church, LeMarquand said that he had removed his name from the letter and did not want to discuss it.

== Family ==
The bishop is married to Dr Wendy LeMarquand. They have two children.

== Bibliography ==
=== Books ===
- Nikkel, Marc (2006). Grant LeMarquand (ed.). Why Haven't You Left?: Letters from the Sudan. New York: Church Publishing. ISBN 978-0-89869-774-2.
- LeMarquand, Grant; Galgalo, Joseph D. (2004). Theological Education in Contemporary Africa. Eldoret, Kenya: African Books Collective. ISBN 978-9966-9742-6-6.
- LeMarquand, Grant (2004). An Issue of Relevance: A Comparative Study of the Story of the Bleeding Woman (Mk 5: 25-34; Mt 9:20-22; Lk 8:43-48) in North Atlantic and African Contexts. New York: Peter Lang. ISBN 978-0-8204-6928-7.
- Barrigar, Chris; LeMarquand, Grant, eds. (1998). The True and Living Word: Sermons from the Community of Wycliffe College. Toronto: Anglican Book Centre.

=== Journals edited ===
- "What is at Stake in the Anglican Crisis?" Trinity Journal for Theology and Ministry 2/2 (2008)
- "Deeply Engaged: Eclectic Studies in Honor of Steven Smith." Trinity Journal for Theology and Ministry 2/1 (2008)
- "Anglicanism Past and Future: Studies in Honor of Leslie P. Fairfield." Trinity Journal for Theology and Ministry 1 (2007)
- "Anglicanism and the Bible." Anglican and Episcopal History 75/4 (2006)
- "‘Death Has Come to Reveal the Faith’: Stories and Studies from the Sudan." Anglican and Episcopal History 71/2 (2002)
- "Essays on the Anglican Church in China 1844-1997." Anglican and Episcopal History 67/2 (1998)
- "Nineteenth-Century Anglican Missionaries in China, Japan, Africa, Latin America and the American West." Anglican and Episcopal History 66/3 (1997)
- "Nippon Sei Ko Kai: Essays on the Church in Japan." Anglican and Episcopal History 65/4 (1996)

=== Book Chapters / Dictionary entries ===
- "Anglicans in the Horn of Africa: From Missionaries and Chaplains to a Missionary Church," Oxford....
- [with Paul Marshall] "Persecution and Martyrdom" in William Dyrness, Veli-Matti Kärkkäinen, Simon Chan, Nzash Lumeya & Juan Francisco Martinez, eds, Global Dictionary of Theology (Downers Grove: IVP, 2008): 648-52
- "‘Crushing the Serpent’s Head’ (Gen 3:15): A North African Woman and the Promise to Eve," pp. 45-68 in Jean-Bosco Matand Bulembat, Paul Bere, Mary Sylvia Nwachukwu and Anthony I. Umoren (eds.), Women in the Bible: Point of vue [sic] of African Biblical Scholars. *Proceedings of the Fifteenth Congress of the Panafrican Association of Catholic Exegetes / Les femmes dans la Bible: Point de vue des exegetes africains. Actes du quinzieme congrès de l’Association Panafricaine des Exégètes Catholiques. Lusaka (Zambia), from the 5th to the 11th September 2011. (Abijan: APECA / PACE, 2013).
- "The Queen of Sheba and Solomon’s Wisdom: A Biblical in Ethiopian Tradition," pp. 263–75 in Jean-Bosco Matand Bulembat (ed.), Human Wisdom and Divine Wisdom in the Bible: Biblical Readings in the Context of the Church as Family of God in Africa. Proceedings of the Twelfth Congress of the Panafrican Association of Catholic Exegetes./ Sagesse humaine et sagesse divine dans la Bible: Lectures bibliques dans le contexte de l’Eglise Famille de Dieu en Afrique: Actes du douzième congrès de l’Association Panafricaine des Exégètes Catholiques. Mélanges offerts à S.E. Mgr Laurent Monsengwo Pasinya à l’occasion de ses 25 ans d’épiscopat. Kinshasa, du 04 au 11 septembre 2005. (Nairobi: APECA / PACE, 2007)
- "The Anglican Church of Kenya," pp. 287–97 in Charles Hefling & Cynthia Sattuck, eds. The Oxford Guide to the Book of Common Prayer: A Worldwide Survey (N.Y.: Oxford, 2006)
- "Siblings or Antagonists? The Ethos of Biblical Scholarship from the North Atlantic and African Worlds," pp. 61–85 in David Tuesday Adamo, ed. Biblical Interpretation in African Perspective (Lanham, Maryland: University Press of America, 2006)
- [with Paul Marshall] "Martyrdom," pp. 417–19 in Campbell Campbell-Jack, Gavin McGrath, C. Stephen Evans, eds. New Dictionary of Christian Apologetics (Leicester: IVP, 2006)
- "Racism," pp. 588–91 in Campbell Campbell-Jack, Gavin McGrath, C. Stephen Evans, eds. New Dictionary of Christian Apologetics (Leicester: IVP, 2006)
- "African Biblical Interpretation," in Kevin Vanhoozer, Craig Bartholomew, Daniel Treier and N.T. Wright, eds. Dictionary for Theological Interpretation of the Bible (Grand Rapids: Baker, 2005): 31-34.
- "‘Prophesy! Who Struck You?’ (Mark 14:65): Understanding a Gospel Text with Africa Help," pp. 171-82 in Jean-Bosco Matand Bulembat, ed. Prophecy and Prophets in the Bible: Requirements of Prophetism in the Church as Family of God in Africa: Proceedings of the Eleventh Congress. Cairo, Egypt: September 6th-12th, 2003 (Kinshasa: Association Panafricaine des Exegetes Catholiques / Panafrican Association of Catholic Exegetes, 2004)
- "Introduction," pp. 1–3 in Joseph Galgalo and Grant LeMarquand, eds. Theological Education in Contemporary Africa (Eldoret, Kenya: Zapf, 2004)
- "Biblical Reflections on a Panel Discussion on ‘Disability," pp. 211–18 in Joseph Galgalo and Grant LeMarquand, eds. Theological Education in Contemporary Africa (Eldoret, Kenya: Zapf, 2004)
- "Learning to Read the Bible in Limuru," pp. 63–82 in Joseph Galgalo and Grant LeMarquand, eds. Theological Education in Contemporary Africa (Eldoret, Kenya: Zapf, 2004)
- "The Changeless, The Changeable, and the Changing: Thoughts on the future of Anglicanism(s)," pp. 1–22 in John Kater, ed. Epiphany West 2003. Anglicanism(s): Identity and Diversity in a Global Communion (Berkeley: CDSP, 2003)
- "From Creation to New Creation: The Mission of God in the Biblical Story," pp. 9–34 in Ian Douglas, ed. Waging Reconciliation: God’s Mission in a Time of Globalization and Crisis. (New York: Church Publishing, 2002)
- with Eliud Wabukala "Cursed Be Everyone Who Hangs on A Tree: Pastoral Implications of Deuteronomy 21:22-23 and Galatians 3:13 in an African Context," pp. 350–59 in Gerald O. West and Musa W. Dube, eds. The Bible in Africa: Transactions, Trajectories and Trends (Leiden: Brill, 2000)
- "New Testament Exegesis in (Modern) Africa," pp. 72–102 in Gerald O. West and Musa W. Dube, eds. The Bible in Africa: Transactions, Trajectories and Trends (Leiden: Brill, 2000)
- "Bibliography of the Bible in Africa" pp. 633–800 in Gerald O. West and Musa W. Dube, eds. The Bible in Africa: Transactions, Trajectories and Trends (Leiden: Brill, 2000)
- "‘There is a Way that Seems Right, but that Way Leads to Death’: A Sermon for Ash Wednesday," pp. 94-100 in Chris Barrigar & Grant LeMarquand, eds. The True and Living Word: Sermons from the Community of Wycliffe College (Toronto: Anglican Book Centre, 1998)
- "The Historical Jesus and African New Testament Scholarship," pp. 161–80 in Michel Desjardins and William Arnal, eds. Whose Historical Jesus? (Studies in Christianity and Judaism, 7; Waterloo: Wilfrid Laurier Press, 1997)
- [with Alister E. McGrath, James I. Packer & John Paul Weston] "Anglicanism Today: The Path to Renewal," pp. 53–63 in George Egerton, ed. Anglican Essentials: Reclaiming Faith within the Anglican Church of Canada (Toronto: Anglican Book Centre, 1994)

=== Journal articles ===
- "Editorial: What is at Stake in the Anglican Crisis?" Trinity Journal for Theology and Ministry 2/2 (2008): 5-13
- "Editorial: Deeply Engaged," Trinity Journal for Theology and Ministry 2/1 (2008): 5-7
- "‘As you are going’ (Mt 28:19): Some Reflections on ‘Unintentional Mission’" Trinity Journal for Theology and Ministry 2/1 (2008): 40-50
- "From Creation to New Creation: The Mission of God in the Biblical Story," in the Korean mission online journal: 선교학술지 ["iworldmission.com"] <http://iworldmission.com/hkhboard/sview.php?id=880&id_no=114&page=&id_reply=> [reprint of an essay first appearing in Ian T. Douglas, ed. Waging Reconciliation: God’s Mission in a Time of Globalization and Crisis (N.Y.: Church Publishing, 2002)]
- "Editorial: Faithfulness in a Liminal Time," Trinity Journal for Theology and Ministry 1 (2007): 4-7
- "A Tribute to John Woolverton: His Passion for Global Anglican History," Anglican and Episcopal History 76/2 (2007): 296-97
- [with Sylvia Keesmaat] "Genocide and Healing?" The Banner [The Magazine of the Christian Reformed Church] 142/3 (March 2007): 32-34. Online edition cited 7 March 2007.
- "Editorial: Anglicanism and the Bible," Anglican and Episcopal History 75/4 (2006): 483-87
- "Bibles, Crosses, Songs, Guns and Oil: Sudanese ‘Readings’ of the Bible in the Midst of Civil War," Anglican and Episcopal History 75/4 (2006): 551-79
- "African Responses to New Hampshire and New Westminster: An Address," Anglican and Episcopal History 75/1 (2006): 13-36
- "Dancing in Kinshasa: A special celebration of a Roman Catholic Mass in the Congo September 4, 2005," Anglican and Episcopal History 75/1 (2006): 163-67
- "‘And the rulers of the nations shall bring their treasures into it’: A Review of Biblical Exegesis in Africa," Anglican Theological Review 88/2 (2006):243-55; reprinted in The ANITEPAM Journal 52 (2006): 75-87
- "The Canaanite Conquest of Jesus (Mt 15:21-28)," in the Festschrift for Dr. Fred Wisse of McGill University published as a special edition of the journal ARC: The Journal of the Faculty of Religious Studies, McGill University (2005): 237-47
- "The Changeless, The Changeable, and the Changing: Thoughts on the Future of Anglicanism(s)," Anglican Theological Review 86/3 (2004): 401-22
- "Siblings or Antagonists? The Ethos of Biblical Scholarship from the North Atlantic and African Worlds," African Journal of Biblical Studies 19/2 (2003):
- "Appropriations of the Cross among the Jieng People of Southern Sudan," Journal of Inculturation Theology 5/2 (2003): 176-98.
- "A Review Article: Bengt Sundkler and Christopher Steed, A History of the Church in Africa," Anglican and Episcopal History 72/4 (December 2003): 511-17.
- "Editorial. ‘Death Has Come to Reveal the Faith’: Stories and Studies from the Sudan," Anglican and Episcopal History 71/2 (2002): 147-49
- "A Tribute to Marc Nikkel, Missionary to the Sudan 1950-2000," Anglican and Episcopal History 71/2 (2002): 242-47
- "‘Faith in Sudan’: Recent work on the history and theology of Christianity in the Sudan," Anglican and Episcopal History 71/2 (2002): 248-61
- "The Bible and Africa(ns), and Africa(ns) and the Bible," Bulletin for Old Testament Studies in Africa 10 (2001): 16-20
- [with Stephanie Douglas] "A Bibliography of Anglicanism Outside Continental North America and the British Isles," Anglican and Episcopal History 68/4 (1999): 517-43
- "Editorial. Anglicanism and China," Anglican and Episcopal History 67/2 (1998): 137-39
- "Select Bibliography of Christianity in China with Special Reference to English Works on Chinese Anglicanism," Anglican and Episcopal History 67/2 (1998): 238-54
- "Editorial. Varieties of Anglican Missionary Experience," Anglican and Episcopal History 66/3 (1997): 266-68
- "Select Bibliography of Christianity in Japan with Special Reference to English Works on Japanese Anglicanism," Anglican and Episcopal History 66/3 (1997): 283-90
- "Solemn Euphoria: The Consecration of Saint Mary Ethiopian Orthodox Tewahedo Church, North York, Ontario, February 21–22, 1997," Anglican and Episcopal History 67/1 (1997): 113-19
- "Editorial. Nippon Sei Ko Kai: Essays on the Church in Japan," Anglican and Episcopal History 65/4 (1996): 401-404
- "A Bibliography of the Bible in Africa: A Preliminary Publication," Bulletin for Contextual Theology in Southern Africa & Africa 2/2 (1995), 6-40
- "Bibliography of the Bible in Africa," Journal of Inculturation Theology 2/1 (1995), 39-139
- "Music and Pictorial Art according to Karl Barth," ARC [McGill] 9/2 (1982), 26-33

=== Reviews & Popular Articles ===
Book reviews in Anglican and Episcopal History, Review of Biblical Literature, Toronto Journal of Theology, Africa Theological Journal, The Anglican Theological Review, Studies in Religion, Prolegomena, BookNotes for Africa, Trinity Journal for Theology and Ministry. Popular articles in The ANITEPAM Bulletin, Trinity [Diocese of Pittsburgh newspaper], Incourage, Seed and Harvest, Insight, Pittsburgh Tribune Review, The Niagara Anglican, The Anglican Journal, The Newspaper, People of God, The Toronto Star, The Montreal Churchman, Partnership News, The Canadian Churchman.

- The Torn Veil in the Synoptic Gospels (McGill University dissertation, 1988)
- A Bibliography of the Bible in Africa: A Preliminary Publication (1994)
- An Issue of Relevance: A Comparative Study of the Story of the Bleeding Woman (Mk 5: 25-34; Mt 9:20-22; Lk 8:43-48) in North Atlantic and African Contexts (New York: Peter Lang, 2004).

Anglican Communion titles
Preceded by Andrew Proud	Area Bishop of the Horn of Africa; 2012–2018	Succeeded by Kuan Kim Seng interim
Preceded by Ronald Jackson diocesan John E. Miller III interim	Bishop of the Great Lakes interim 2020–2021	Succeeded by Mark Engel
