= Allen Kannapell =

American Anglican bishop (born 1969)

The Right Reverend Allen Kannapell
- Suffragan Bishop of the Great Lakes
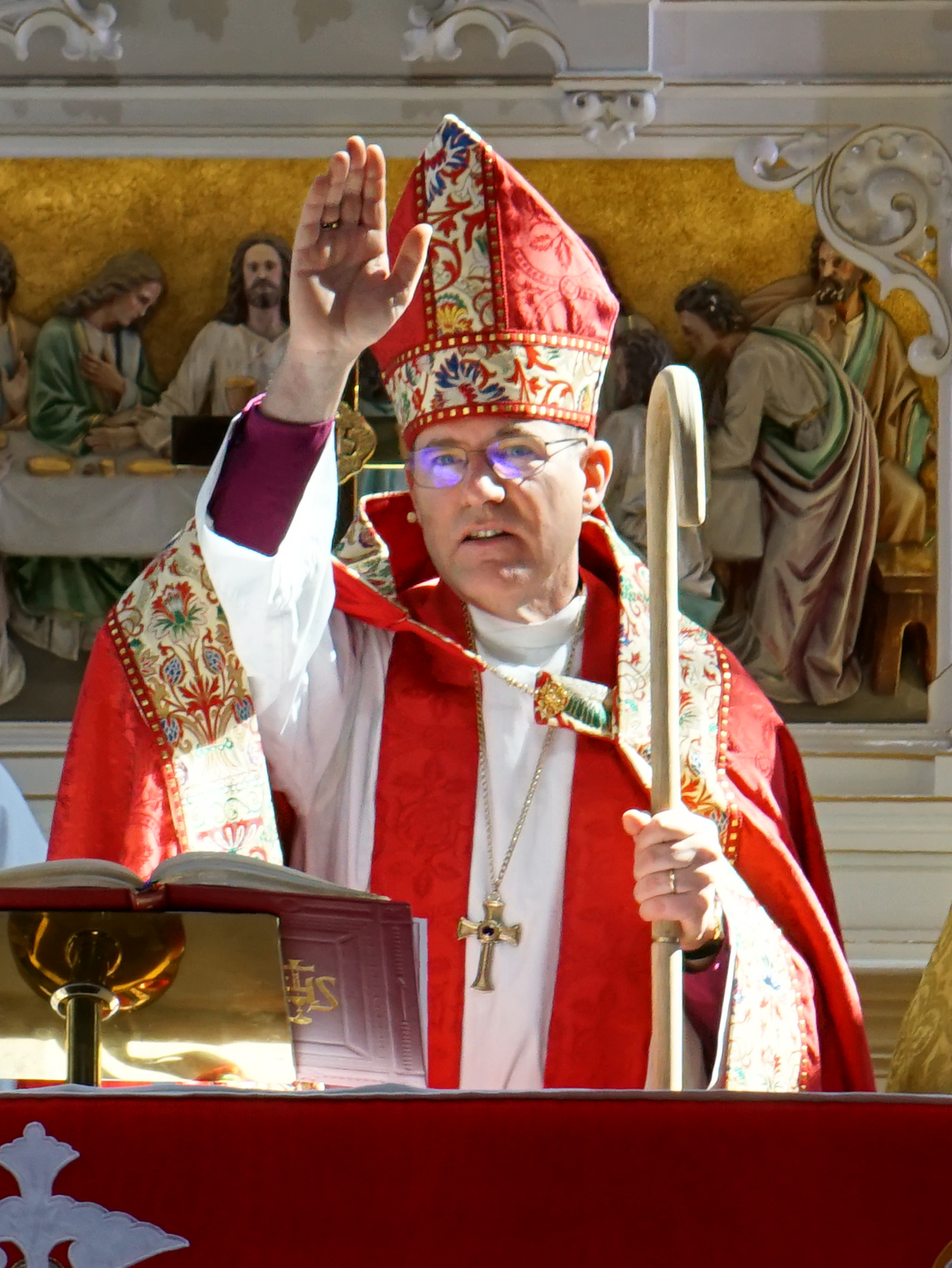
- Bishop Kannapell at his consecration in 2024
- Church: Anglican Church in North America
- Diocese: Great Lakes
- In office: 2024–present
- Other posts: Rector, His Church Anglican
- Previous posts: Archdeacon, West Mission Area

Orders
- Ordination: 1997
- Consecration: March 16, 2024 by Foley Beach

Personal details
- Born: 1969 (age 56–57)
- Education: University of Virginia, Yale Divinity School

Charles Allen Kannapell (born 1969) is an American Anglican bishop. He was consecrated in 2024 as the first bishop suffragan of the Anglican Diocese of the Great Lakes in the Anglican Church in North America. He also played a role in the Anglican realignment in Michigan as pastor of the first Episcopal congregation in the state to leave the church.

== Anglican realignment ==
In 2002, Kannapell became rector of St. Andrew's Episcopal Church in Livonia, Michigan. Amid heightened tensions in the Episcopal Church over issues of sexuality and the doctrine of Scripture, Kannapell and the St. Andrew's vestry in 2005 formally requested alternative episcopal oversight from another Anglican province. Bishop of Michigan Wendell Gibbs responded that there was no canonical provision for delegating oversight to another province, although he offered delegated episcopal pastoral oversight from within the Episcopal Church—including Bishop Keith Ackerman of the Diocese of Quincy—a solution that the St. Andrew's vestry declared inadequate.

In October 2005, the congregation voted to remove itself from the Diocese of Michigan and chose not to pursue DEPO within the Episcopal Church. "Our Vestry has come to conclude that our obedience to God's call should not be predicated on the future obedience of any bishop currently in ECUSA [Episcopal Church] no matter how orthodox that bishop may be," Kannapell wrote. In response, in January 2006 Gibbs inhibited Kannapell and removed the vestry.

The departing St. Andrew's members made no effort to sue to retain their building. After leaving the Episcopal Church, Kannapell and other St. Andrew's members planted His Church Anglican (HCA).

== Anglican Church in North America ==
In 2019, HCA moved into the former Trinity Church building on Six Mile Road in Livonia. HCA had rented the building for a number of years, and Trinity Church sold the building to HCA for $1 when it experienced decline. HCA had grown to an average attendance of more than 100 parishioners.

In addition to serving as rector of HCA, Kannapell was archdeacon for the western mission area of the Anglican Diocese of the Great Lakes. In 2016, Kannapell was a finalist in the election for diocesan bishop of the Great Lakes; Ronald Jackson was ultimately elected. In 2023, Kannapell was elected as a part-time suffragan bishop of the diocese, a role that would allow him to continue serving as rector of HCA. He was consecrated on March 16 by Foley Beach in Livonia.

== Personal life ==
Kannapell is married to Lisa, a homeschool enrichment educator. They have three grown children.
