= John Miller (bishop) =

American Anglican bishop (born 1949)

The Right Reverend John E. Miller III
- Retired Assisting Bishop, Gulf Atlantic Diocese
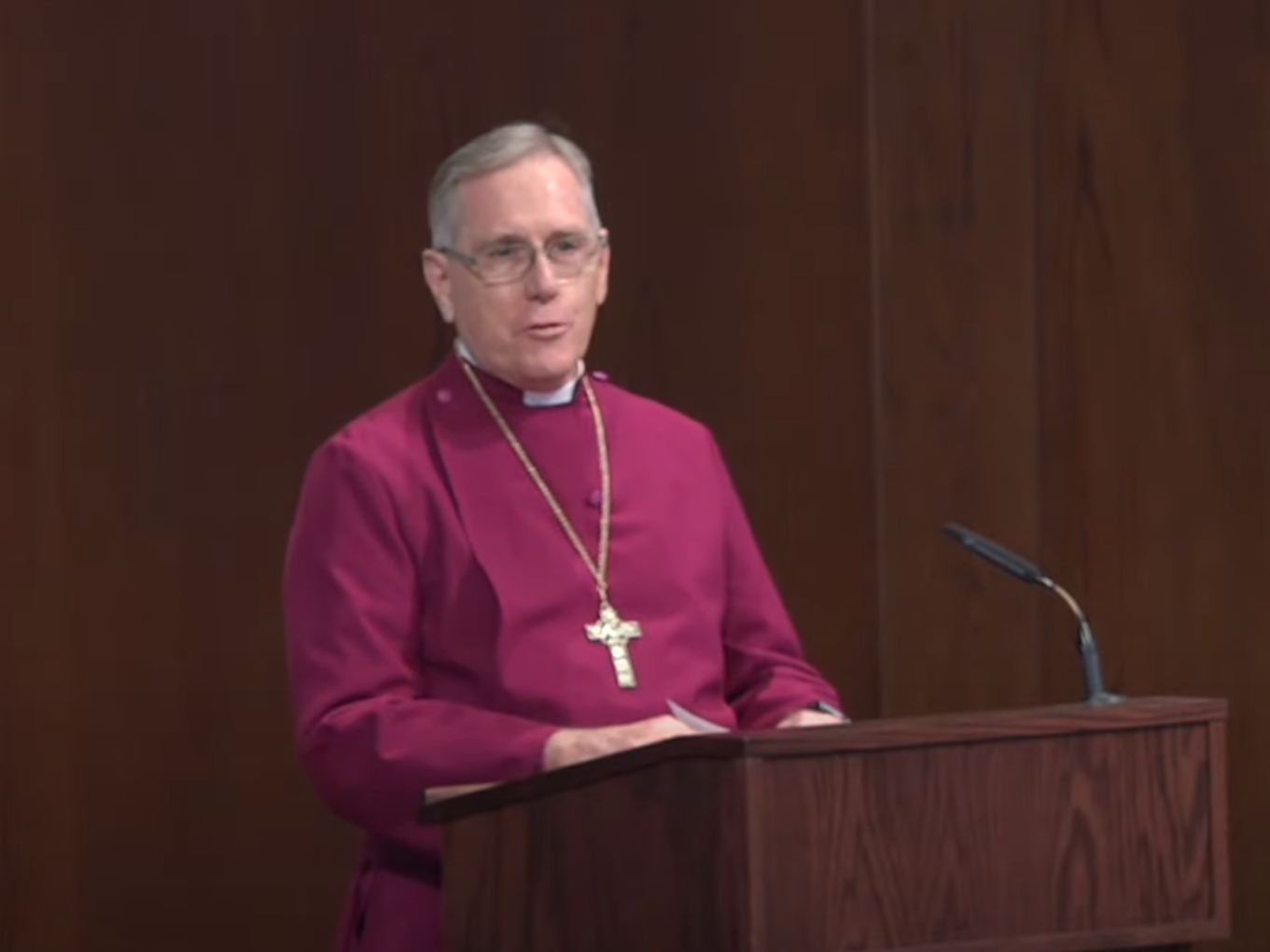
- John E. Miller III speaks at an Anglicans for Life service preceding the 2020 March for Life.
- Church: Anglican Church in North America
- Diocese: Gulf Atlantic
- Previous post(s): Missionary Bishop, Anglican Mission in America; Interim Bishop, Anglican Diocese of the Great Lakes; Acting Bishop, Anglican Diocese of the Upper Midwest

Orders
- Ordination: 1993 (diaconate); 1994 (priesthood)
- Consecration: January 26, 2008 by Emmanuel Kolini

Personal details
- Born: 1949 (age 75–76); Easton, Pennsylvania

John Engle Miller III (born 1949) is an American marine biologist and retired bishop of the Anglican Church in North America. He is a former Episcopal priest who played an active role in the Anglican realignment in the United States. Consecrated in 2008 to serve as a bishop in the Anglican Mission in the Americas, Miller later served as assisting bishop in the Gulf Atlantic Diocese and provided interim support during episcopal vacancies and leaves of absence in the Anglican Diocese of the Great Lakes and the Anglican Diocese of the Upper Midwest.

== Early life, education, and marine biology career ==
Miller is a native of Easton, Pennsylvania. He received his B.A. in zoology from the University of South Florida, where he also did graduate studies in marine biology in 1965. Miller worked as a marine biologist at the Smithsonian Institution in Washington and the Harbor Branch Oceanographic Institute in Fort Pierce, Florida, for eighteen years. His research was conducted from Bermuda to Antarctica and throughout the Caribbean Sea. He is married to Joyce and they have three adult children.

In 1990, Miller enrolled in Trinity School for Ministry. While there, he and his wife Joyce were spiritually influenced by the discipleship ministry of Thad and Erilynne Barnum in Aliquippa. Miller graduated in 1993 with an M.Div. and was ordained in the Episcopal Diocese of Central Florida.

== Ordained ministry ==
Miller served as assistant rector and school chaplain at Holy Trinity Episcopal Church in Melbourne, Florida, in 1994, and as priest in charge from 1994 to 1996. From 1996 to 2004, he was rector of St. John's Episcopal Church in Melbourne. In 2004, he left the Episcopal Church and joined the Anglican Mission in the Americas, planting Prince of Peace Anglican Church in Melbourne. By 2008, Prince of Peace Anglican had grown to 400 members.

In 2007, the Rwandan bishops elected Miller to serve as a missionary bishop in the AMIA. He was consecrated in January 2008 by Emmanuel Kolini alongside Terrell Glenn and Philip Jones. Miller oversaw a network of more than 30 AMIA congregations in Florida, Georgia, and Alabama while remaining rector of Prince of Peace, as was customary for AMIA bishops.

In 2010, AMIA—which had been a founding member of the ACNA the year before—left full membership, changing its status in ACNA to "ministry partner." By the next year, the relationship between AMIA chairman Murphy and the Anglican Church of Rwanda's house of bishops, led by Kolini's successor Onesphore Rwaje, had broken down over questions of financial transparency and collegiality. Except for Glenn and Barnum, the AMIA bishops removed AMIA from Rwandan jurisdiction and restructured it as a "missionary society." In the fallout from AMIA's break with ACNA and Rwanda, some AMIA bishops—including Miller—transitioned directly into the ACNA.

Miller accepted a call in 2012 as rector of Christ Church in Vero Beach, a four-year-old congregation in the recently formed Gulf Atlantic Diocese, where Miller was appointed assisting bishop. Miller was restored to membership in the ACNA College of Bishops in 2013. In 2017, Miller presided over the dedication of a new 27,000-square-foot facility for Christ Church, and in 2019, he retired as rector of Christ Church.

== Later life ==
In retirement, Miller took on interim roles across the ACNA. From 2019 to 2020, he was interim bishop of the Diocese of the Great Lakes during the episcopal vacancy between Ronald Jackson and Mark Engel. From 2021 to 2022, after allegations of mishandling of abuse reports, Miller was acting bishop in the Diocese of the Upper Midwest, appointed by ACNA Primate Foley Beach and with delegated authority from the UMD's Bishop's Council during Stewart Ruch's leave of absence.

Miller also serves as a "soul care" counselor for clergy in partnership with Thad Barnum.

== Bibliography ==
- Miller, J. E.; Pawson, D. L. (1979). "A new subspecies of Holothuria lentiginosa Marenzeller from the western Atlantic Ocean (Echinodermata: Holothuroidea)". Proceedings of the Biological Society of Washington. 91: 912–922.
- Pawson, D. L.; Miller, J. E. (1981). "Western Atlantic sea cucumbers of the genus Thyone, with descriptions of two new species (Echinodermata: Holothuroidea)". Proceedings of the Biological Society of Washington. 94 (2): 391–403.
- Pawson, D. L.; Miller, J. E. (1983). "Systematics and ecology of the sea urchin genus Centrostephanus (Echinodermata: Echinoidea) from the Atlantic and eastern Pacific Oceans". Smithsonian Contributions to Zoology. 40: 1–67.
- Hendler, G.; Miller, J. E. (1984). "Ophioderma devaneyi and Ophioderma ensiferum, new brittle star species from the western Atlantic". Proceedings of the Biological Society of Washington. 97: 442–461.
- Miller, J. E.; Pawson, D. L. (1984). "Holothurians (Echinodermata: Holothuroidea)". Memoirs of the Hourglass Cruises. 7 (1): 1–79.
- Turner, R. L.; Miller, J. E. (1986). "Psolus pawsoni (Echinodermata: Holothuroidea), a new bathyal sea cucumber from the Florida East Coast". Proceedings of the Biological Society of Washington. 99 (3): 478–485.
- Miller, J. E.; Pawson, D. L. (1990). "Swimming sea cucumbers (Echinodermata: Holothuroidea); a survey, with analysis of swimming behavior in four bathyal species". Smithsonian Contributions to the Marine Sciences. 35 (35): 1–18. doi:10.5479/si.01960768.35.1.
- Hendler, G.; Miller, J. E.; Pawson, D. L.; Kier, P. M. (1995). Sea Stars, Sea Urchins, and Allies: Echinoderms of Florida and the Caribbean. Washington: Smithsonian Institution Press.

Anglican Communion titles
Preceded by Ronald Jackson	Bishop of the Great Lakes interim 2019–2020	Succeeded by Grant LeMarquand interim Mark Engel diocesan
Preceded by Stewart Ruch	Bishop of the Upper Midwest acting 2021–2022	Succeeded by Stewart Ruch
