= David Bena =

American Anglican bishop (born 1943)

The Right Reverend David Bena
- Retired Bishop, Anglican Diocese of the Living Word
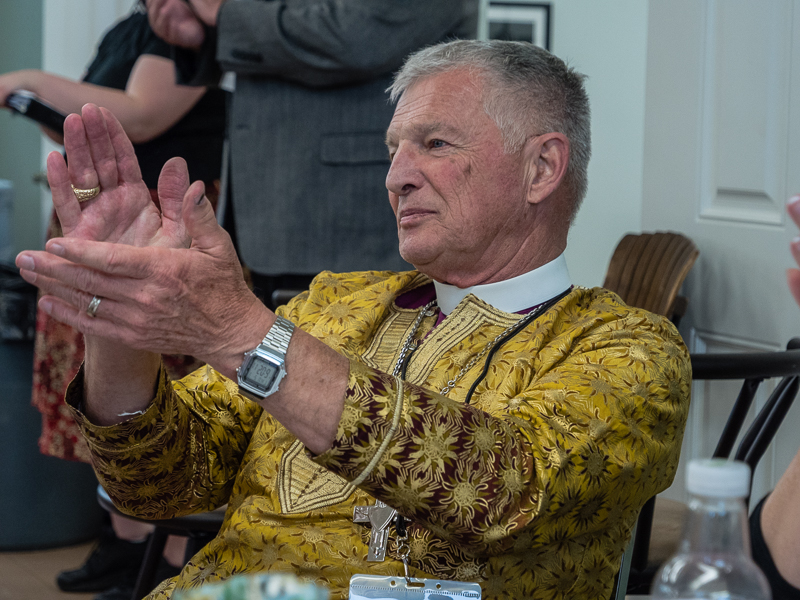
- Church: Anglican Church in North America
- Diocese: Living Word
- Previous posts: Bishop Suffragan, Episcopal Diocese of Albany

Personal details
- Born: December 10, 1943 (age 82)

David John Bena (born December 10, 1943) is an American Anglican bishop.

He was Suffragan Bishop of the Episcopal Diocese of Albany from 2000 to 2007. He subsequently joined the Convocation of Anglicans in North America, in March 2007, a missionary body of the Church of Nigeria in the United States and Canada, that would be a founding body of the Anglican Church in North America, in 2009. He served as Suffragan Bishop of CANA, assisting Missionary Bishop Martyn Minns in CANA's church-growing until his retirement in 2011. He came out of retirement to be the interim rector of St. Margaret's Anglican Church in Woodbridge, Virginia. Bishop Bena now serves as Assistant Bishop of the ACNA Diocese of CANA East.

== Bibliography ==
- Your Faith: Memorial, Memory or Miracle? (Forward Movement, 2003) ISBN 9780880282505

== See also ==
- List of bishops of the Anglican Church in North America
