= Sam Seamans =

20th- and 21st-century American bishop

- Rector of St. Thomas Orthodox Church, Mountain Home, Arkansas
- In office: 2009–present

Orders
- Consecration: 10 January 2009

Personal details
- Born: 1967 (age 58–59) Morgan City; St. Mary Parish; Louisiana, United States
- Denomination: Orthodox
- Residence: Mountain Home; Baxter County, Arkansas

Samuel Seamans (born 1967) was an assisting bishop in the Diocese of Mid-America of the Reformed Episcopal Church and the Anglican Church in North America's College of Bishops until he and his parish decided to join the Orthodox Church in November 2015. He is a priest in good standing in the Ukrainian Orthodox Church USA. He is the rector of St. Thomas the Apostle Orthodox Church in Mountain Home, Arkansas. Seamans is a licensed pilot and Emergency Medical Technician.

== Ministry ==
During college Seamans was employed as a police officer and completed the police academy in 1987. After graduation he moved to Mountain Home, Arkansas, and went to work with the Mountain Home Police department where he eventually served as a lieutenant before retiring in 2011. Seamans states he felt a growing desire to fulfill a vacuum in his spiritual life and in 1997 he began to study church history and liturgy. Then, he states, he found a historical, ancient expression of Christianity in the Anglican tradition. In November 2015 he became Orthodox.

=== History ===
Seamans then continued to serve under Arkansas Episcopal bishop Larry Maze, but left the Episcopal Church three years later because of its social and theological liberalism, as well as what he describes as "its departure from the norms that Holy Scripture lays out for the Christian life and ministry".

Consecration in St. Louis, 10 January 2009. Bishops Peter D. Robinson, Sam Seamans and Wes Nolden in front

=== Episcopal priest controversy ===
In November 2009, Seamans gained international notice by exposing an All Saints Day liturgy used by an Episcopal priest in Harrison, Arkansas. The liturgy "Praises Mohammed, Vishnu, Buddha, Confucius ..." with the celebrant stating: "All you Hindu saints; we praise you for holy are you ... All you Buddhist saints, we praise you for holy are you ..." even calling on "All you Incas of Peru, holy Mayans and Aztecs of Mexico, all you Native children of the sun and stars ..."

The Episcopal Bishop of Arkansas (TEC) supported the liturgy under the guise of "inter-faith dialogue".

== Education ==
Seamans holds a bachelor's degree from the University of Southwestern Louisiana in Liberal Arts, Master of Ministry Degree from Trinity Theological Seminary in Newburgh, Indiana, Th.M (Masters in Theology) from Cranmer Theological House (REC), and a Graduate Certificate from the Anglican School for Ministry in Anglican Studies, in addition to a Master of Divinity from Holy Resurrection Orthodox Seminary. He was ordained an Orthodox priest in February 2017.

Seamans is conversant in Czech, is a licensed pilot for single engine aircraft, and is a certified emergency medical technician. He is also a long distance cyclist and is very proud of his "Giant FCR 1 Flatbar Road Bike". He says, "I get most of my praying done while riding. I find it a very contemplative exercise which easily gives itself to prayer and meditation."

== Career and family life ==
Seamans is a retired lieutenant from MHPD. He is married to a native of the Czech Republic and has two children.

== Publications ==
- Introduction to Holy Communion and the Bible from the 1928 Book of Common Prayer, BorderStone Press, LLC (2010). Editor Brian R. Mooney. ISBN 978-0-9842284-8-5
