= William Ilgenfritz =

American Anglican bishop (1946–2026)

The Right Reverend William Ilgenfritz
- Bishop of the Missionary Diocese of All Saints
- Church: Anglican Church in North America
- Diocese: All Saints
- In office: 2009–2021
- Successor: Richard Lipka

Orders
- Ordination: 1986
- Consecration: August 22, 2009 by Robert Duncan

Personal details
- Born: October 16, 1946
- Died: August 5, 2026 (aged 79)
- Education: Trinity Episcopal School for Ministry

William Henry Ilgenfritz (October 16, 1946 – August 5, 2026) was an American Anglican bishop. Ordained as an Episcopal priest, he was the first bishop to be consecrated in the newly formed Anglican Church in North America in 2009 and the first bishop ordinary of the Missionary Diocese of All Saints (MDAS), a non-geographic Anglo-Catholic diocese within the ACNA.

== Biography ==
William Henry Ilgenfritz was born on October 16, 1946. He was baptized at St. Stephen's Episcopal Church in McKeesport, Pennsylvania, in 1946. Ilgenfritz began his career in youth-serving nonprofits and was chaplain at St. Jude's Ranch for Children in Nevada and executive director of the Children's Aid Society in Pennsylvania. He enrolled in Trinity Episcopal School for Ministry in 1981 and was ordained to the priesthood in 1986.

After his ordination, Ilgenfritz was a rector at St. John's Episcopal Church in Brownwood, Texas; Mount Calvary Church in Baltimore; St. Stephen's Episcopal Church in Whitehall Township, Pennsylvania; and St. Mary's Anglican Church in Charleroi, Pennsylvania.

He was also a leader within the Anglo-Catholic movement in the United States, serving as vice president of Forward in Faith North America (FiFNA). In 2002, he had been proposed in 2002 as a "flying bishop" for FiFNA member churches. After the election of the out gay priest Gene Robinson as Episcopal bishop of New Hampshire in 2003, Ilgenfritz weighed leaving the Episcopal Church and participated in efforts by the American Anglican Council to form a new Anglican province. When Robinson was elected, Ilgenfritz said it was "the first time in my life I'm ashamed to be an Episcopalian."

Ilgenfritz represented FiFNA in meetings of the Common Cause movement, which united several Episcopalians and other Anglican groups in what eventually became the Anglican Church in North America. Prior to the ACNA's 2009 inaugural assembly, the church's bishops elected Ilgenfritz to serve as bishop of the MDAS, a newly formed diocese for FiFNA member churches.

In 2018, Ilgenfritz told the synod of MDAS that the diocese was in talks with Old Catholic churches due to discomfort with the ACNA's ongoing practice of allowing its member dioceses to ordain women to the priesthood.

Ilgenfritz was succeeded as bishop ordinary by Richard Lipka. He died at home on August 5, 2026, at the age of 79.

Anglican Communion titles
New title	I All Saints; 2009–2021	Succeeded by Richard Lipka
