= Richard Lipka =

American Anglican bishop

The Right Reverend Richard W. Lipka
- Bishop Ordinary of the Missionary Diocese of All Saints
- Episcopal seal of Bishop Lipka
- Church: Anglican Church in North America
- In office: 2021–2025
- Predecessor: William Ilgenfritz
- Successor: Darryl Fitzwater
- Previous posts: Bishop Suffragan, Missionary Diocese of All Saints (2009-2021); Diocesan Bishop of the Delmarva, Charismatic Episcopal Church (2004-2006); Diocesan Bishop of the Hawaiian Islands and the American Protectorates, Charismatic Episcopal Church (1995-2004)

Orders
- Ordination: 17 December 1966 by Francis F. Reh
- Consecration: 4 August 1995

Personal details
- Born: October 22, 1940 (age 86) Wilmington, Delaware
- Education: Saint Mary’s College; Pontifical Gregorian University; St. Mary’s Seminary; University of Maryland; Pontifical North American College

Richard Walter Lipka (born 1940) is an American Anglican bishop. Lipka served as a Roman Catholic and Episcopal priest before being consecrated in the Charismatic Episcopal Church. He later joined the Anglican Church in North America, where he was 2021 to 2025 bishop ordinary of the Missionary Diocese of All Saints, an Anglo-Catholic diocese. He is a significant figure in the Episcopal charismatic renewal movement and the Anglican realignment.

== Early life and education ==
Lipka was born in Wilmington, Delaware, to Adam Lipka and Mary Deptula Lipka. He was raised in the Catholic Church at St. Hedwig's Parish in Wilmington. He graduated from St. Mary's College in Michigan and received an M.A. from St. Mary's Seminary. Lipka also earned an S.T.B. from the Pontifical Gregorian University in Rome. While studying at the Pontifical North American College, Lipka was ordained to the Catholic priesthood in 1966, then returned to serve as a parish priest in the Diocese of Wilmington.

== Move to Anglicanism ==
In 1971, Lipka was received by Harry Lee Doll as a priest in the Episcopal Diocese of Maryland. He served as a curate at St. Margaret's Episcopal Church in Annapolis, one of the original 30 Episcopal parishes in Maryland. After leaving the Catholic priesthood, Lipka married Susan and they had four children.

From 1972 to 1989, Lipka served as rector of St. Mary's Episcopal Church in the Hampden area of Baltimore. During this time, he became engaged in the charismatic renewal movement in the Episcopal Church. He also hosted Regeneration, a ministry to same-sex attracted Christians, and served on its board. In 1989, Lipka moved to Hawaii to serve as rector of St. Mary's Episcopal Church in Honolulu. In 1994, Lipka and a majority of St. Mary's members voted to leave the Episcopal Church as part of the then-nascent Anglican realignment and join the two-year-old Charismatic Episcopal Church, which was formed out of the convergence movement blending charismatic and liturgical worship. "Over the last several years," he said at the time, "I and many of the members of St. Mary's [in Honolulu] have felt more and more marginalized and disenfranchised from the mainstream of the Episcopal Church in the U.S.A. We no longer felt a part of the family."

== Episcopal ministry ==
On 4 August 1995, Lipka was consecrated as a bishop in the Charismatic Episcopal Church. He served as bishop of the Diocese of the Hawaiian Islands and the American Protectorates. On 5 November 1997, Lipka was conditionally re-consecrated by Luis Fernando Castillo Mendez when the CEC entered into intercommunion with the Brazilian Catholic Apostolic Church. (All CEC clergy were reconsecrated and reordained by the Brazilian Catholic Apostolic Church through the episcopal genealogy of Carlos Duarte Costa.)

In 2006, as part of a schism in the CEC, Lipka and the Diocese of the Delmarva disassociated from the CEC and became part of the Communion of Christ the Redeemer, which was affiliated with the Anglican Province of America and seeking to be integrated into it as of 2008. Lipka served as president of the COCTR. By 2011, 15 of 21 COCTR congregations were no longer affiliated with the APA but had rather joined the newly formed ACNA Missionary Diocese of All Saints (MDAS), with Lipka being appointed bishop suffragan.

In 2018, amid concerns that the relatively small size of MDAS might make it difficult to elect its own bishop when the sitting bishops retired and MDAS objections to women's ordination in other ACNA dioceses, Lipka held out the possibility of MDAS joining the old Catholic Union of Scranton alongside the Polish National Catholic Church and the Nordic Catholic Church.

In 2021, Lipka succeeded William Ilgenfritz as MDAS' bishop ordinary. He serves as vice president of Forward in Faith North America, which promotes Anglo-Catholic worship and opposes women's ordination. He also serves as rector of Holy Trinity Cathedral in Berlin, Maryland. In 2024, the Missionary Diocese of All Saints elected a bishop coadjutor to succeed Lipka upon his retirement.

Religious titles
Preceded by William Ilgenfritz	II Bishop of All Saints; 2021 – 2025	Succeeded by Darryl Fitzwater
