= Clark Lowenfield =

American Anglican bishop (born 1957)

The Right Reverend Clark W. P. Lowenfield
- Bishop of the Western Gulf Coast
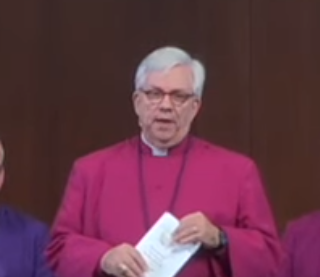
- Church: Anglican Church in North America
- Diocese: Western Gulf Coast
- In office: 2013–2026
- Successor: Vacant
- Other post: Chairman of the American Anglican Council

Orders
- Consecration: April 20, 2013 by Robert Duncan

Personal details
- Born: 1957 (age 68–69)

Clark Wallace Paul Lowenfield (born 1957) is an American Anglican bishop. From 2013 to 2026, he was the first diocesan bishop of the Anglican Diocese of the Western Gulf Coast, which has jurisdiction in southeast Texas and Louisiana, in the Anglican Church in North America.

== Education, family and early career ==
Lowenfield grew up in El Paso. He received his B.A. in political science and economics from Amherst College and his M.Div. from the School of Theology at Sewanee. He is married to Tricia and they have three grown daughters.

Lowenfield has served as an Episcopal priest in South Carolina and in Texas. He was rector of the Anglo-Catholic Church of the Holy Communion in Charleston, South Carolina, during Hurricane Hugo, remaining in Charleston during the storm to attend to elderly parishioners who refused to evacuate. He later served for five years as a rector of Trinity Episcopal Church in the master-planned community of the Woodlands, Texas. However, after the 2000 General Convention of the Episcopal Church―which approved a resolution that, although it did not go so far as to recommend trial liturgies for same-sex relationships, did acknowledge the presence of out gay and lesbian committed couples in the Episcopal Church and pledged to "provide for them the prayerful support, encouragement, and pastoral care necessary to live faithfully"—some Trinity members became concerned and Lowenfield decided to leave the Episcopal Church.

== Anglican Church in North America ==
=== Transition from AMIA ===
Lowenfield worked as a pastor outside the Anglican tradition in El Paso for a time. In 2003, he was called to be senior pastor of the Church of the Holy Spirit, a Woodlands-based church plant in the Anglican Mission in the Americas (AMIA). In 2005, the church renamed itself HopePointe Anglican Church—Hope because "[w]e want to reach as many people as we can, spreading God's word of hope, peace and love," Lowenfield has said, and Pointe with an "e" "to reflect ancient Anglican roots and to remain in keeping with the refined ethos of The Woodlands area," according to a news report—and in 2008 moved from rented space into a modern church facility designed for a contemporary worship style. Prior to owning a building, HopePointe avoided scheduling weeknight activities "that take people away [from their families] in the evening,” Lowenfield said.

In 2010, AMIA—which had been a founding member of the Anglican Church in North America the year before—left full membership, changing its status in ACNA to "ministry partner." By the next year, the relationship between Chuck Murphy, the leader of AMIA, and its province of canonical residence, the Anglican Church of Rwanda, had broken down, and Murphy and all but two AMIA bishops removed AMIA from Rwandan jurisdiction and restructured it as a "missionary society." In early 2012, a majority of AMIA congregations elected to remain canonically in the Rwandan church and pursue full membership in the ACNA, forming PEARUSA as an interim step. Lowenfield and HopePointe were among those temporarily in PEARUSA pursuing ACNA membership. In June 2012, a group of churches in southeast Texas and Louisiana were collectively approved as a diocese in formation by the ACNA. Lowenfield was elected the first bishop of the new diocese.

=== Episcopacy ===
Lowenfield was consecrated by ACNA Archbishop Robert Duncan at the Woodlands Methodist Church in April 2013, and the Diocese of the Western Gulf Coast was formally approved as an ACNA diocese in the summer of 2013. In addition to Anglican bishops and priests, the consecration was attended by 32 pastors from other Woodlands churches who were part of an ecumenical group co-founded by Lowenfield called One Mission. “What God has done in The Woodlands is that he has caused a number of churches to realize that we’re not supposed to be divided,” Lowenfield said. “We might worship differently on some things, but we’re called to be the church together.”

Since the diocese was formed, it has grown from 12 to 16 congregations as of 2021, with membership of more than 2,200 and average Sunday attendance of nearly 1,400. Lowenfield continued to serve as senior pastor of HopePointe until he was succeeded by the Rev. Travis King.

Lowenfield opposes women's ordination to the priesthood and episcopate; in 2021 he signed a Forward in Faith North America letter in 2020 that condemned the consecration of female bishops in the Anglican Church of Kenya, a GAFCON member province in communion with ACNA.

Also in 2021, the popular former Baptist Bible teacher Beth Moore disclosed that she had joined an Anglican church in the Diocese of the Western Gulf Coast, triggering criticism from some Baptist ministers. In response, Lowenfield posted on Twitter: "As her Bishop, [i]t is an honor to serve God as Beth Moore’s spiritual oversight and covering. She is humble and grace-filled. And we pray for those who have been treating her in unChristianly ways over this past week."

Lowenfield concluded his tenure as bishop of the Diocese of the Western Gulf Coast in 2026. Later that year, he became chairman of the American Anglican Council.

Religious titles
New title	Bishop of the Western Gulf Coast; 2013–2026	Vacant
Preceded by David Anderson	Chairman of the American Anglican Council; 2026–present	Incumbent
