= Andrew Williams (bishop) =

U.K.-born American Anglican bishop

The Right Reverend Andrew Williams
- Bishop of New England
- Church: Anglican Church in North America
- Diocese: New England
- In office: 2019–present
- Predecessor: William Murdoch

Orders
- Ordination: 2000 (diaconate); 2001 (priesthood)
- Consecration: March 16, 2019 by Foley Beach

Andrew Thomas Williams is a British-born American Anglican bishop. Since 2019 he has been the diocesan bishop of the Anglican Diocese in New England, part of the Anglican Church in North America. He was a lawyer in the United Kingdom prior to his entry into ordained ministry in the Church of England and his move to the United States.

== Early life, education, and legal career ==
Williams was born in the United Kingdom. He graduated from Tavistock School in 1985 and received a law degree from Exeter University in 1988. In 1985, he met his future wife, Elena, at Exeter University; they married in 1992 and have three daughters.

Williams trained for law in Chancery Lane and worked from 1989 through 1994 at Cameron McKenna in London as a litigator defending architects, accountants, actuaries, insurance brokers, and Lloyd's underwriters in civil suits. From 1994 to 1998, he was a senior litigator with S.J. Cornish and Bond Pearce, where he specialized in legal malpractice defense.

In the 1990s, the Williamses moved to a large house in North Devon. While there, Williams said he "had this deep conviction that there was something missing. There was a quiet sort of despair within me that was only temporarily distracted by the next grand interior decoration scheme." To meet locals, they visited their local Church of England parish, where Williams said "a kindly new vicar and a friendly small group of people came around us, and I found myself intrigued by and drawn to them all at the same time. . . . [T]hey always spoke about Jesus like they knew him personally. I decided that I liked them sufficiently that I was not going to hold that against them." Not long after, Williams participated in a Lenten Bible study and had a conversion experience, praying “I am saying ‘yes’ to You without reservation. Whatever You want for my life, I desire too.” His wife had a similar experience.

== Ordained ministry ==
Williams—who had become disenchanted and unfulfilled in his law career—pursued a call to ministry. In 2000, he received his theology degree from Trinity College Bristol and was ordained in the Diocese of Exeter. He served as curate at St. Andrew's Whitchurch and from 2003 to 2009 was associate vicar at St. Andrew's Chorleywood in the Diocese of St. Alban's. At Chorleywood―a large evangelical congregation in the C of E―he was assigned to develop a missional growth strategy to address a passive laity and a 10 percent annual membership turnover rate. At the time, the church had no midsize small groups, just prayer groups of three to four. Williams established 40 "mission-shaped communities" (MSCs) characterized by "low control, high accountability." They were designed to reach unchurched groups, including youth, the elderly, prisoners, the disabled, special-needs adults, people experiencing homelessness, immigrants and others. Williams identified and mentored 120 volunteer lay leaders for these MSCs. The size of these groups enabled more leaders to be identified and develop their leaderships skills, management expert Gary Hamel has observed. Between 2003 and 2009, St. Andrew's tripled in size to 1,600 attendees.

The MSC model attracted international interest and Williams co-authored a book on the concept entitled Breakout: One Church's Amazing Story of Growth Through Mission-Shaped Communities. In 2008, while speaking on the model at a conference of the Anglican Diocese of Pittsburgh, Williams was connected to Trinity Church, a non-denominational multisite church in Greenwich, Connecticut. Trinity had been founded ten years before Williams' arrival but was not growing, with an average attendance of 250 to 300. Williams grew the church to 1,200 in attendance at three Sunday services in addition to a Trinity offshoot in Darien. Trinity's services were held in rented space in schools, hotels, and other churches, a deliberate decision (although Williams led a $6 million fundraising campaign for Trinity's office and ministry center for midweek programming in Greenwich). Williams was also noted for his use of video and social media as pastor of Trinity.

In 2018, Bill Murdoch, the retiring bishop of the Anglican Diocese in New England, asked Williams to agree to be considered as his successor. Williams initially turned the invitation down but reconsidered. On November 17, 2018, Williams was elected bishop of ADNE. He was consecrated by ACNA Archbishop Foley Beach at a Catholic church in Amesbury, Massachusetts, on March 16, 2019, and enthroned at All Saints Cathedral the following day.

Religious titles
Preceded by William Murdoch	II Bishop of New England; 2019–present	Succeeded by Incumbent
