= Darryl Fitzwater =

American Anglican bishop

The Right Reverend Darryl Fitzwater
- Bishop Ordinary of the Missionary Diocese of All Saints
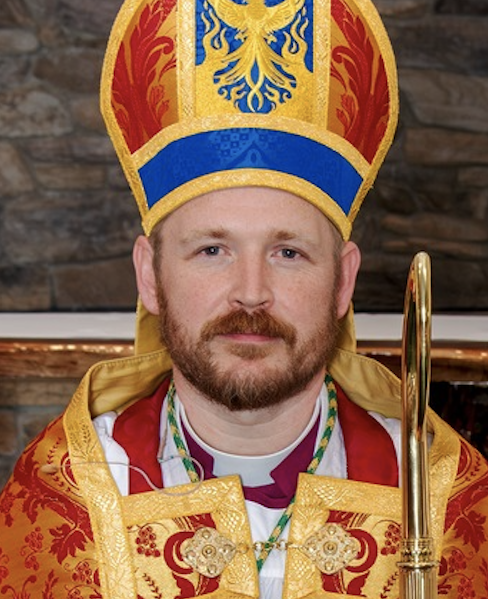
- Church: Anglican Church in North America
- Diocese: All Saints
- In office: 2025–present
- Predecessor: Richard Lipka

Orders
- Ordination: 2017
- Consecration: October 4, 2024 by Foley Beach

Personal details
- Education: Asbury Theological Seminary

Darryl Lynn Fitzwater Jr. is an American Anglican bishop. Consecrated in 2024, he is the third bishop ordinary of the Missionary Diocese of All Saints, an Anglo-Catholic diocese in the Anglican Church in North America.

== Biography ==
Fitzwater grew up in West Virginia. He became a Christian in 1995. He began his career in ministry in 2000 as a pastor in the International Pentecostal Church of Christ, serving as a district official and on boards and committees related to foreign missions. In 2012, Fitzwater and his wife, Rebecca, left the Pentecostal church and began moving into Anglicanism. Fitzwater completed a master of divinity degree at Asbury Theological Seminary and was ordained to the priesthood in 2017, at which time he planted the Church of the Ascension in Charles Town, West Virginia. He is also a co-host of Forward in Faith North America's podcast and the Appalachian Anglican podcast.

In April 2024, Fitzwater was elected bishop coadjutor of the Missionary Diocese of All Saints to succeed Richard Lipka following the latter's retirement. His election was consented by the ACNA bishops in June 2024, and Fitzwater was consecrated at Church of the Ascension on October 4, 2024. He will continue to serve as rector of Ascension, which transferred to MDAS from the Diocese of the Mid-Atlantic and will become MDAS's new cathedral. Fitzwater was installed as the diocese's third bishop ordinary on March 21, 2025.

Religious titles
Preceded by Richard Lipka	Bishop Ordinary of the Missionary Diocese of All Saints; Since 2025	Incumbent
