= Mark Engel (bishop) =

American Anglican bishop (born 1955)

The Right Reverend Mark A. Engel
- Bishop of the Great Lakes
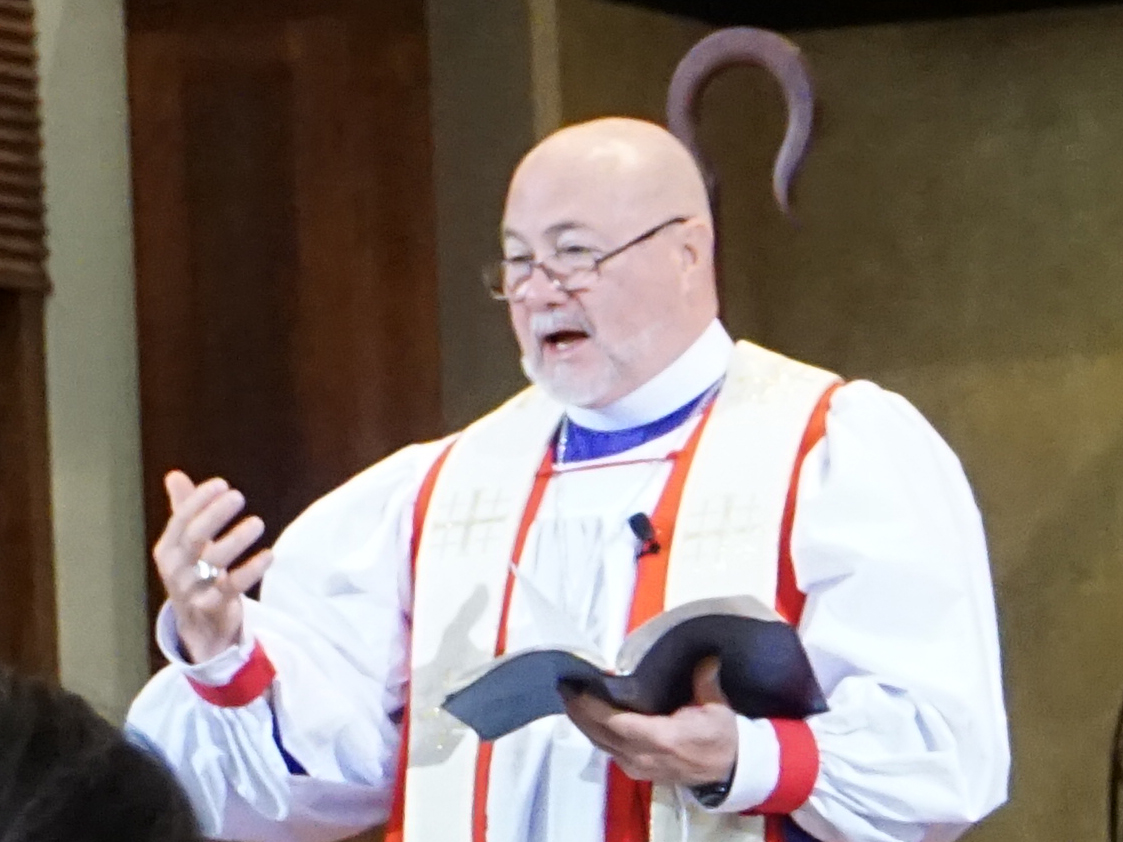
- Bishop Engel in 2022
- Church: Anglican Church in North America
- Diocese: Great Lakes
- In office: 2021–present
- Predecessor: Ronald Jackson

Orders
- Ordination: June 8, 2014 (diaconate); November 6, 2014 (priesthood) by Roger Ames
- Consecration: February 13, 2021 by Foley Beach

Personal details
- Born: 1955 (age 69–70)

Mark A. Engel (born 1955) is an American Anglican bishop. Since 2021, he has been the third diocesan bishop of the Anglican Diocese of the Great Lakes (ADGL) in the Anglican Church in North America.

== Education and family ==
Engel graduated from Malone University in 1978. He received his M.Div. from Ashland Theological Seminary in 1982. He married Terri Shackelford, and they have three adult children. Terri Engel and one of their children, Elisabeth Engel, are ordained deacons serving at Holy Spirit Anglican Church in Akron, Ohio.

== Ministry career ==
The Engels began ministry with the Evangelical Friends Church Eastern Region, an evangelical branch of the Quaker movement. They served in Cleveland for five years, then as church planters and missionaries in Taiwan for 10 years. Upon returning to the United States, from 1995 to 2008 Engel was senior pastor of First Friends Church of Canton, Ohio.

In 2009, Engel planted a nondenominational church in Canton. In 2015, Gateway Anglican Church was received into the ADGL. He later served as assisting priest and pastor for discipleship at Holy Spirit Anglican Church in Akron. He also served as Akron area dean for the ADGL and chaired the diocese's standing committee.

On November 14, 2020, Engel was elected bishop after a lengthy vacancy following the resignation and laicization of Ronald Jackson on charges of conduct unbecoming of clergy. Engel was consecrated on February 13, 2021, by ACNA Archbishop Foley Beach, at the Old Stone Chapel in Canton.

Anglican Communion titles
Preceded by Ronald Jackson (diocesan); Grant LeMarquand (interim)	III Bishop of the Great Lakes; 2021–present	Succeeded by incumbent
