= Anglican Diocese of the Great Lakes =

Anglican diocese in the United States

Diocese of the Great Lakes

Location
- Ecclesiastical province: Anglican Church in North America

Statistics
- Parishes: 40 (2025)
- Members: 3,280 (2025)

Information
- Rite: Anglican

Current leadership
- Bishop: Mark Engel
- Suffragan: Allen Kannapell

Website
- Official Website

The Anglican Diocese of the Great Lakes is a diocese of the Anglican Church in North America since June 2010. It has 42 congregations in the American states of Indiana, Kentucky, Michigan, New York, Ohio. It was previously the Anglican District of the Great Lakes of the Convocation of Anglicans in North America, since August 2008, which was a founding diocese of the Anglican Church in North America in June 2009.

== History ==
The history of the Anglican Diocese of the Great Lakes starts in April 2003, when five parishes from northern Ohio left the Episcopal Church, because of their perceived departure from orthodox Anglicanism, to align themselves with the Diocese of Bolivia, from the Anglican Church of the Southern Cone of America. New parishes joined them and it became clear that the huge distance didn't favour the integration in the South American diocese. The Great Lakes parishes joined the Convocation of Anglicans in North America in 2007, a missionary outreach of the Anglican Church of Nigeria. In December 2007, Roger Ames, the rector of St. Luke's Anglican Church in Akron, Ohio, received his ordination and consecration as suffragan bishop of CANA. The churches, now in number of 13 congregations, become the Anglican District of the Great Lakes of the CANA, in August 2008, with Roger Ames as their first bishop. The district was a founding member, as part of the CANA, of the Anglican Church in North America, in June 2009.

In an extraordinary Constitutional Convention, held in April 2010, the district became the Anglican Diocese of the Great Lakes. On June 9 of the same year, the Provincial Assembly of the ACNA unanimously recognized the new diocese. Roger Ames was elected at the Constitutional Convention their first bishop, being formally installed at the diocese annual convention in Akron, on April 30, 2011.

The extraordinary Synod, held on 3 October 2015, nominated three candidates to the election of the new bishop of the Anglican Diocese of the Great Lakes. The College of the Bishops of the ACNA, reunited in Vero Beach, Florida, on 6 January 2016, elected Ronald Jackson, who was consecrated at St. Bernard Catholic Church in Akron, Ohio, on 28 April 2016.

Jackson went on an administrative leave in November 2019, because of an upcoming canonical process, and he resigned for health reasons in January 2020. He was replaced temporarily by John Miller, who also had to step down for health reasons. On 25 March 2020, it was announced that Grant LeMarquand, professor of the Trinity School for Ministry would take office as interim bishop until the election and enthronement of the new bishop, expected to take place, respectively, at the Fall of 2020 and at early 2021.

A Special Synod took place on 14 November 2020 and elected Mark Engel as the new bishop of the diocese. He was consecrated on 13 February 2021 in Canton, Ohio.

== Bishops ==
=== Diocesan bishops ===
1. Roger Ames (2011–2016)
2. Ronald Jackson (2016–2019)
  • John E. Miller III (2020), interim bishop
  • Grant LeMarquand (2020–2021), interim bishop
3. Mark Engel (2021–present)

=== Suffragan bishops ===
- Allen Kannapell (2024–present)

== Parishes ==
In 2025, the diocese had 40 parishes (down two from 2022) with 3,280 members (up 11% from 2022) and an average Sunday attendance of 2,369 (up 30% from 2022).
