= Anglican Diocese in New England =

Diocese of New England
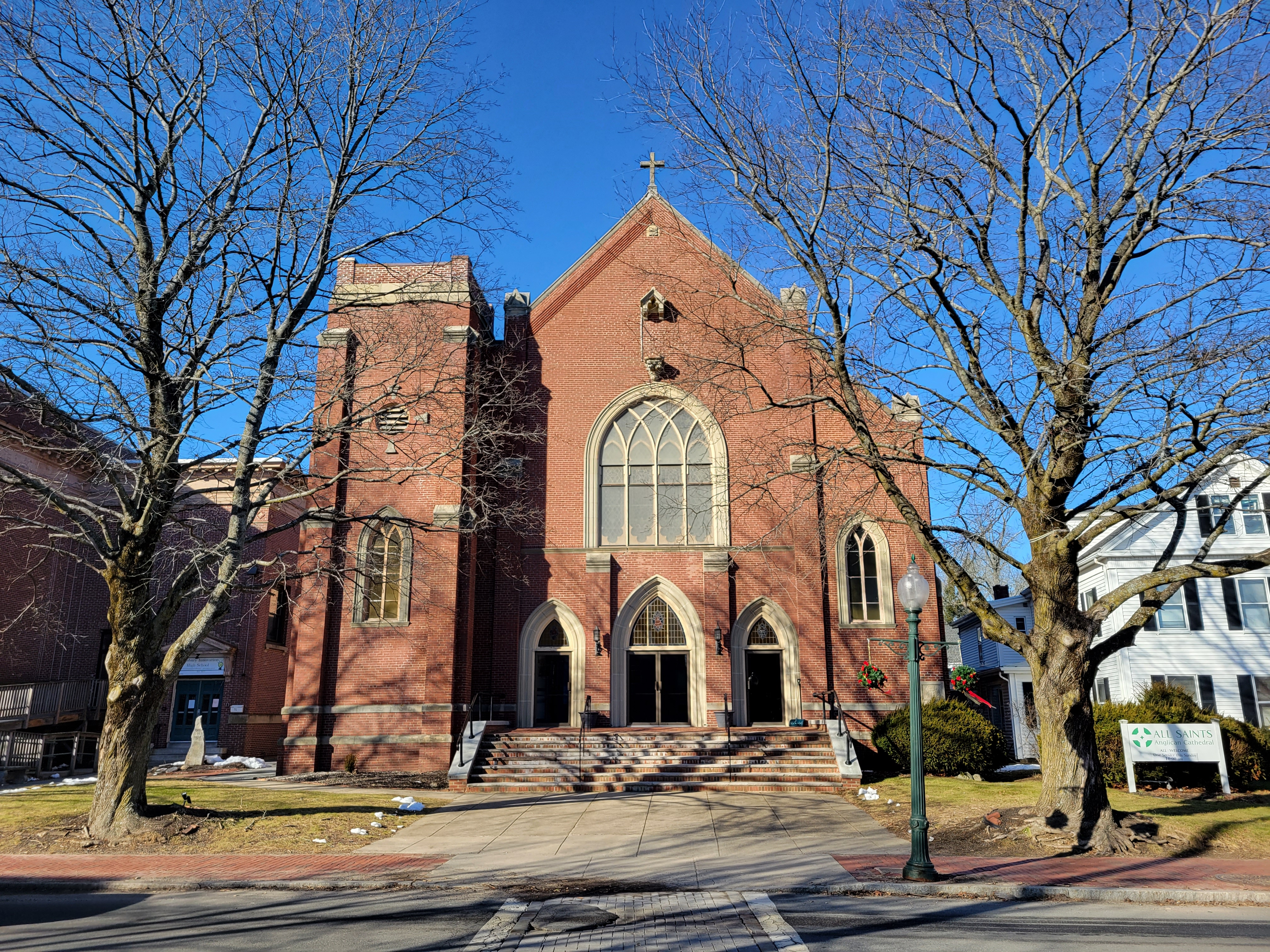
- All Saints Church, ADNE's diocesan cathedral and headquarters

Location
- Ecclesiastical province: Anglican Church in North America

Statistics
- Parishes: 30 (2025)
- Members: 2,204 (2025)

Information
- Rite: Anglican
- Cathedral: All Saints Cathedral, Amesbury, Massachusetts

Current leadership
- Bishop: Andrew Williams

Website
- adne.org

The Anglican Diocese in New England is a diocese of the Anglican Church in North America (ACNA). The diocese, based in Amesbury, Massachusetts, comprises 30 congregations in 6 American states, Connecticut, Maine, Massachusetts, New Hampshire, Rhode Island and Vermont. The state with most congregations is Massachusetts, with 14.

The diocese was created as a result of the Anglican realignment movement in that region of the United States, in 2009, and was officially recognized by ACNA on June 10, 2010, during the annual Provincial Council and College of Bishops meeting which took place in Amesbury, Massachusetts, 7–11 June 2010.

The Rev. William Murdoch was elected as the first bishop of the diocese. He had served as rector of All Saints Episcopal Church in West Newbury, Massachusetts, since 1993, and left the Episcopal Church with his congregation in 2007 to join the Anglican Church in North America upon its creation in 2009. He was nominated Suffragan Bishop of the Archbishop of the Anglican Church of Kenya to assist in the formation of a new Anglican province in the United States and Canada. He was elected the first bishop of the Anglican Diocese in New England in 2009 and was installed in 2010. Murdoch resigned as rector of the All Saints Anglican Church in Amesbury in February 2012 to focus on his work as bishop of the diocese.

Andrew Williams was elected on 17 November 2018, by diocesan synod, to be the second bishop of the Anglican Diocese in New England, and was consecrated on 16 March 2019.

In 2025, the diocese had 30 congregations with 2,204 members (up 3% from 2022) and an average Sunday attendance of 1,683 (up 40% from 2022).
