= Roger Ames =

American Anglican priest (born 1942)

The Right Reverend Roger Ames
- Bishop of the Great Lakes
- Church: Anglican
- Diocese: Anglican Diocese of the Great Lakes
- In office: 2011–2016
- Predecessor: See created
- Other post(s): Bishop of the Anglican District of the Great Lakes in the Convocation of Anglicans in North America

Orders
- Consecration: 2011 by Robert Duncan

Personal details
- Born: 7 December 1942 (age 82)

Roger Copeland Ames (born 7 December 1942) is an American Anglican priest. He is the first bishop of the Anglican Diocese of the Great Lakes in the Anglican Church in North America, after being a suffragan bishop for the Convocation of Anglicans in North America. He is married and has two adult children and three grandchildren.

He received his undergraduate degree at Denison University. After ten years working at the sales and marketing business, and at a college admissions office, he experienced a religious conversion. He and his family started to attend a local Episcopal congregation and he decided to follow religious life. He studied at the Seabury-Western Theological Seminary, where he earned his M.Div. in 1977. He was ordained as a deacon in June 1977 and as a priest in December 1977.

Ames served as rector of Christ Church, Charlevoix, Michigan, moving afterwards to St. Luke's Anglican Church, in Fairlawn, near Akron, Ohio, where he remained for more than 20 years. He and his congregation left the Episcopal Church in 2004, coming under the oversight of bishop Frank Lyons, of the Diocese of Bolivia at the Anglican Church of the Southern Cone of America. He worked with bishop Martyn Minns in bringing several former Episcopal congregations from the South American diocese to the Convocation of Anglicans in North America, the missionary body of the Church of Nigeria in the United States. In December 2007, Ames was consecrated as a suffragan bishop of the CANA. The number of churches, now 13, due to church planting initiative in which he was involved, become the Anglican District of the Great Lakes of the CANA in August 2008, with him as their first bishop. As part of the CANA, they were a founding jurisdiction of the ACNA in June 2009.

In April 2010 at a Constitutional Convention, the district became the Anglican Diocese of the Great Lakes, with Ames being installed as their first bishop at 30 April 2011, at the diocese annual convention in Akron. He would be in office until 2016, when he was succeeded by Ronald Jackson.

Ames, as well as being involved in the church planting initiative, served on the board of directors of the American Anglican Council and was also one of the founders of the HarvestNet Institute.

Anglican Communion titles
Preceded by See created	I Bishop of the Great Lakes; 2011–2016	Succeeded by Ronald Jackson
