= Winfield Mott =

American Anglican bishop

The Right Reverend Winfield Mott
- Bishop of the West
- Church: Anglican
- Diocese: Reformed Episcopal Diocese of the West
- In office: 2011–2016

Orders
- Consecration: 2011

Winfield Mott is an American Anglican bishop. He is a bishop in the Anglican Church in North America (ACNA) and the Reformed Episcopal Church. He became the second bishop of the Reformed Episcopal Diocese of the West in 2011. He was briefly the first Vicar General of the Convocation of the West of the Missionary Diocese of All Saints in 2016. He was succeeded by Canon Michael Lenfied.

== Biography ==
Mott was previously a parish priest in Deming and Silver City, New Mexico from 2000 until 2011. He serves as a member of ACNA's Ecumenical Relations Task Force and the ACNA Immigration Task Force.

In 2011, Mott, the formerly co-adjutor bishop of the West, became diocesan bishop upon Boyce's retirement. Anticipating Mott's retirement in 2016, and without the support of REC bishops to elect a diocesan bishop necessary for the diocese to continue, the standing committee of the Diocese of the West voted unanimously to transition from an REC diocese into a convocation within the Missionary Diocese of All Saints. The last synod of the Diocese of the West was held on April 5–6, 2016, and the organizing synod of the Convocation of the West was on April 6–7, 2016, and overlapping the concluding synod of the Diocese of the West. At the organizing synod, Mott was elected the Vicar General.

In 2011, he was elected vicar-general for ACNA's Anglican Diocese of the Southwest. He became their first Vicar General upon their admission at ACNA as a full member diocese in June 2013. He held office both as bishop of the REC Diocese of the West and as Vicar General of the Anglican Diocese of the Southwest, which he was until 2014.

== Notes ==
Anglican Communion titles
Preceded by Diocese created	Vicar General of the Diocese of the Southwest; 2013–2014	Succeeded by Mark Zimmerman (as first bishop)
Preceded by Richard Boyce	Diocesan Bishop, Diocese of the West; 2011–2016	Succeeded by Diocese transitioned to the Convocation of the West
Preceded by Convocation of the West created	Vicar General of the Convocation of the West; 2016–present	Succeeded by Michael Lenfield
