= Anglican Diocese of the Western Gulf Coast =

Anglican diocese in the United States

Diocese of the Western Gulf Coast

Location
- Ecclesiastical province: Anglican Church in North America

Statistics
- Parishes: 14 (2025)
- Members: 2,030 (2025)

Information
- Rite: Anglican
- Cathedral: St. Timothy's Anglican Church, Spring, Texas

Current leadership
- Bishop: The Rt. Rev. Clark W. P. Lowenfield

Website
- dwgc.org

The Anglican Diocese of the Western Gulf Coast is a diocese of the Anglican Church in North America comprising congregations in Texas and Louisiana. It has 14 churches and a church plant, according to its website.

The movement to start a new diocese of the ACNA in the states of Texas and Louisiana begun in 2011. In June 2012, the Anglican Diocese of the Western Gulf Coast was officially approved as a diocese-in-formation at the ACNA General Assembly.

On April 20, 2013, Clark W. P. Lowenfield was consecrated as the first bishop of the new diocese-in-formation in The Woodlands, Texas, by the Most Rev. Robert Duncan. The Anglican Diocese of the Western Gulf Coast was admitted as a full member diocese at the ACNA General Assembly in June 2013.

In 2025, the diocese reported 14 congregations (down one from the year before) and 2,030 members (down 15% from 2022) with an average Sunday attendance of 1,508 (up 11% from 2022).
