= American Anglican Council =

Anglican organization in the United States

- Formation: 1996
- Type: religious non-profit
- Headquarters: Atlanta, Georgia
- Location: 36 U.S. states
- Members: 80,000 individuals (estimated)
- Chairman: Clark Lowenfield
- President: Mark Eldredge
- Website: http://www.americananglican.org

The American Anglican Council began as an organization of theologically conservative Anglicans from both the Anglican Church in North America (ACNA) and The Episcopal Church in the United States. According to its membership brochure, it was founded "as a response to unbiblical teachings that crept into The Episcopal Church and the larger Anglican Communion." The organization believes that "the Episcopal Church (and a few other parts of the Anglican Communion, including the Anglican Church in Canada) faces an extreme crisis of belief centered on the uniqueness of Jesus Christ as Savior and the authority of Scripture. This crisis has resulted in conflicts over specific behavior and practices that are informed by Scripture, including issues concerning human sexuality and marriage, though these issues are in reality symptoms of the deeper issues."

In 2008, the AAC was one of the founding members of the ACNA. Since then it has worked mostly with ACNA parishes. Its website states that 'after it became apparent that the Episcopal Church had set its course in another direction, the AAC began to focus on building up Great Commission leaders and churches within the emerging Anglican Church in North America and the Anglican Communion.' Its report for the year ending June 15 2021 does not mention any activity in the Episcopal Church.

The AAC has EIN 75-2668339 as a 501(c)(3) Public Charity; in 2024 it claimed $583,174 in total revenue and $294,504 in total assets.

== Mission ==
According to its website, the American Anglican Council is "a network of individuals, parishes, dioceses and ministries who affirm biblical authority and Christian orthodoxy within the Anglican Communion" whose mission is "to build up and defend Great Commission Anglican churches in North America and worldwide through advocacy and counsel, leadership development and equipping the local church."

== Positions ==
The AAC believes that "Christian mission is rooted in unchanging biblical revelation." Presently it sees "specific challenges to authentic faith and holiness [...] which require thoughtful and vigorous response." These challenges include moral relativism, a lack of "Christian ethical principles" in "the public life of the nation", "abortion, unwanted pregnancy, and end-of-life illness", and questions of sexual ethics.

== Ecclesiastical status ==
The American Anglican Council is not an ecclesial body, but rather an advocacy organization with ministry involving education, communication, strategic planning, diplomacy, counsel and resource networking with other Anglican bodies domestically and internationally.

It works directly with Episcopal Churches and Episcopalians who are committed to remaining in the Episcopal Church for the foreseeable future; conservative Anglican Churches and individuals who are in the process of leaving the Episcopal Church; and Anglican churches and individuals who are outside or were never affiliated with the Episcopal Church.

== Leadership ==
The AAC leadership includes:

- Clark Lowenfield, Chairman of the Board
- Mark Eldredge, President

== See also ==
- Anglican realignment
- Anglican Communion
- Anglican views of homosexuality
- Confessing Movement
- Continuing Anglican Movement
