= William Murdoch (bishop) =

The Right Reverend William L. Murdoch
- Bishop of New England
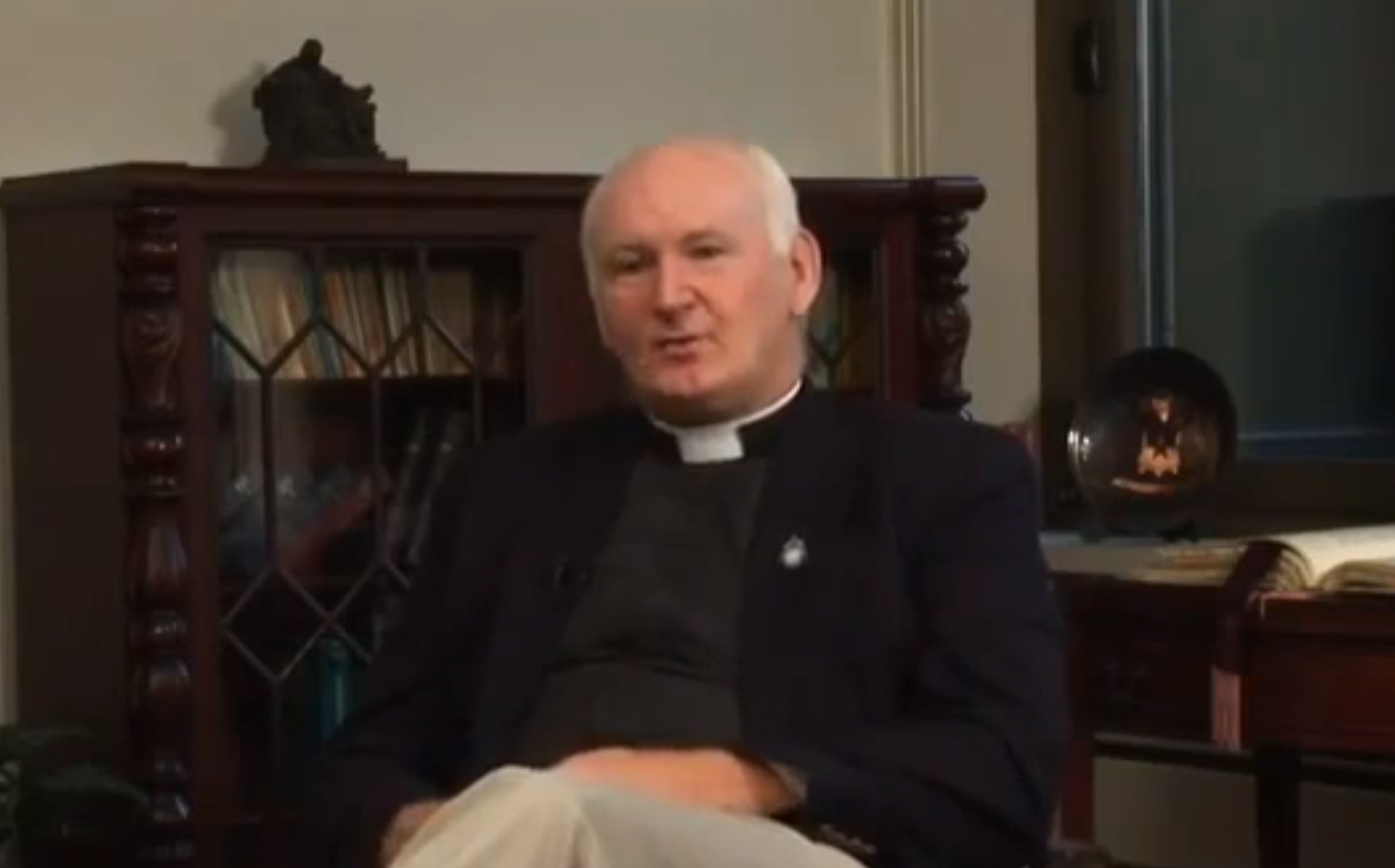
- Then-Episcopal priest Bill Murdoch interviewed in a 2005 Anglican Communion Network documentary.
- Church: Anglican Church in North America
- Diocese: Anglican Diocese in New England
- In office: 2009 to 2019
- Predecessor: inaugural
- Successor: Andrew Williams
- Previous post(s): Suffragan bishop of the Anglican Church of Kenya (2007–2009)

Orders
- Ordination: May 1986
- Consecration: August 30, 2007 by Benjamin Nzimbi

Personal details
- Born: 1949 (age 75–76)

William "Bill" L. Murdoch (born 1949) is an American Anglican bishop. He is married to Sally and they have three adult children.

== Ecclesiastical career ==
Murdoch has a BS at the University of New Hampshire and a M.Div. at the Gordon-Conwell Theological Seminary. He was ordained first as a Congregational minister and after as an Episcopal priest in May 1986.

He served as rector of the All Saints Episcopal Church in West Newbury, Massachusetts, from 1993 to 2007. During his leadership his congregation experienced an unusual growth. He left the Episcopal Church, with his parish, in 2007, due to his opposition to the ordination on non-celibate homosexual clergy, and he became a Suffragan Bishop of the Anglican Church of Kenya. He was consecrated on August 30, 2007, at All Saints' Cathedral, Nairobi in Kenya. He joined the Anglican Church in North America, upon its creation, in June 2009. He became the first Bishop of the Anglican Diocese in New England, in 2009. He resigned as rector of his parish in 2012, to focus on his work as bishop.

He was also adjunct professor at the Gordon-Conwell Theological Seminary. He has led several Alpha Holy Spirit Weekends for Christians of several denominations.

Anglican Communion titles
New title	I New England; 2009–2019	Succeeded by Andrew Williams
