= Wes Nolden =

US Air Force officer and Anglican clergy

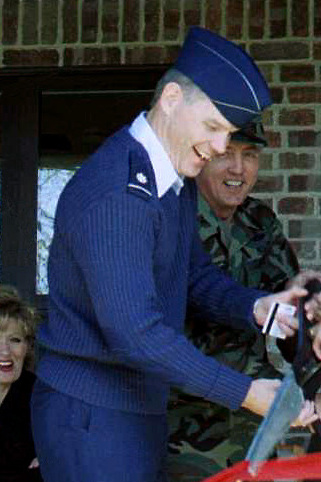
- Lt Col Nolden (front) in 1999

Ecclesiastical career
- Religion: Christianity
- Church: UECNA (2005); REC (April 2009)
- Ordained: January 2009
- Title: Bishop
- Military career
- Branch: US Air Force
- Rank: Lieutenant colonel
- Commands: 97th Services Squadron

Wes Nolden is a United States Air Force officer and disputed bishop in the Reformed Episcopal Church.

== Military career ==
In 1999, Nolden was a lieutenant colonel in the United States Air Force, and commander of the 97th Services Squadron at Altus Air Force Base in Oklahoma.

== Religious career ==
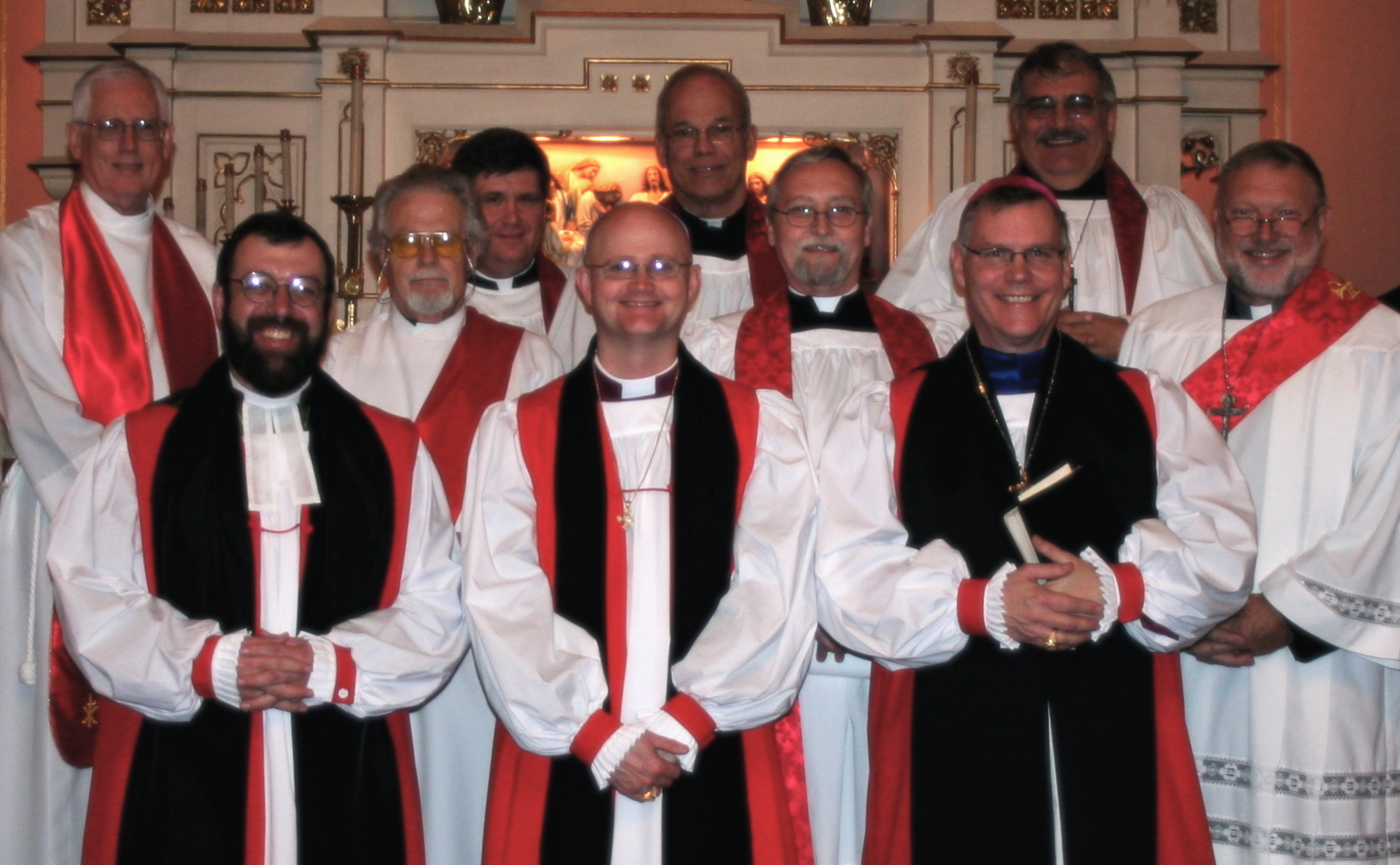
Nolden at his Jan 2009 consecration

In 2005, the United Episcopal Church of North America (UECNA) presiding bishop, Stephen C. Reber, welcomed Nolden as new clergy. Nolden was consecrated a UECNA bishop in January 2009.

In April 2009, Nolden was received into the Reformed Episcopal Church (REC). That June, Reber deposed Nolden allegedly because the latter "conspired to leave the UECNA before his consecration." According to Reber, the deposition effectively reversed Nolden's consecration, saying "It is hereby declared, therefore, that your so-called consecration as Bishop of UECNA is invalid, that you did not ever become a Bishop of the UECNA, and any reference to your becoming a Bishop is untrue." Nolden disputed the claims, saying that his reception into the REC as a bishop was done according to the rules. REC bishop Royal U. Grote Jr. also opposed Reber's claims, saying that Nolden was no longer in the archbishop's jurisdiction, and could therefore not be deposed.

From 2010 to 2012, Nolden served as a representative of the Anglican Church in North America (a denomination in communion with the REC) during ecumenical dialogue with the Lutheran Church–Missouri Synod.
