= Diocese of All Saints (ACNA) =

Anglican diocese in the United States

Location
- Ecclesiastical province: Anglican Church in North America

Statistics
- Parishes: 26 (2025)
- Members: 1,223 (2025)

Information
- Rite: Anglican
- Cathedral: Church of the Ascension, Charles Town, West Virginia

Current leadership
- Bishop ordinary: Darryl Fitzwater

Website
- allsaintsdiocese.org

The Diocese of All Saints (formerly known as the Missionary Diocese of All Saints) is a non-geographical diocese of the Anglican Church in North America (ACNA). It was formed in 2009 by congregations affiliated with Forward in Faith North America (FiFNA), an Anglo-Catholic organization within the Anglican Communion, and the Diocese of All Saints retains an Anglo-Catholic orientation. As of 2024, it had 27 member parishes and was headquartered at the Cathedral Church of the Ascension in Charles Town, West Virginia.

== History ==
As the ACNA was formed in 2009, the Missionary Diocese of All Saints was founded as a non-geographic diocese for FiFNA member churches across the country. It joined the dioceses of Fort Worth, Quincy and San Joaquin in representing the Anglo-Catholic tradition within the ACNA. Prior to the ACNA's 2009 inaugural assembly, the church's bishops elected William Ilgenfritz to serve as bishop of the MDAS. (Ilgenfritz had previously been proposed in 2002 as a "flying bishop" for FiFNA member churches.)

By 2011, the diocese incorporated the Communion of Christ the Redeemer, a group of congregations previously part of the Charismatic Episcopal Church, and appointed the leader of this group, Bishop Richard Lipka, as MDAS bishop suffragan. In 2016, the Reformed Episcopal Church, a fellow member of the ACNA, decided not to elect a new bishop for its Diocese of the West due to unsustainable congregational sizes in that diocese. MDAS welcomed several of those congregations to join as the Convocation of the West. Bishop Winfield Mott served as the convocation's first vicar general.

In 2018, amid discontentment about the continued practice of women's ordination to the priesthood within the ACNA, Ilgenfritz told the MDAS synod that he was in talks with Old Catholic Union of Scranton jurisdictions about MDAS potentially joining. He also expressed concern that due to the diocese's small size—it had an average Sunday attendance of less than 600 in 2020—it might not be allowed to elect a new bishop when he and Lipka eventually retired. Ilgenfritz also complained about the presence of adherents to Reformed theology within the ACNA. At the FiFNA assembly that year, Ilgenfritz expressed further concerns about women's ordination in the ACNA and what he called the emergence of the ACNA as a "confessing Protestant church."

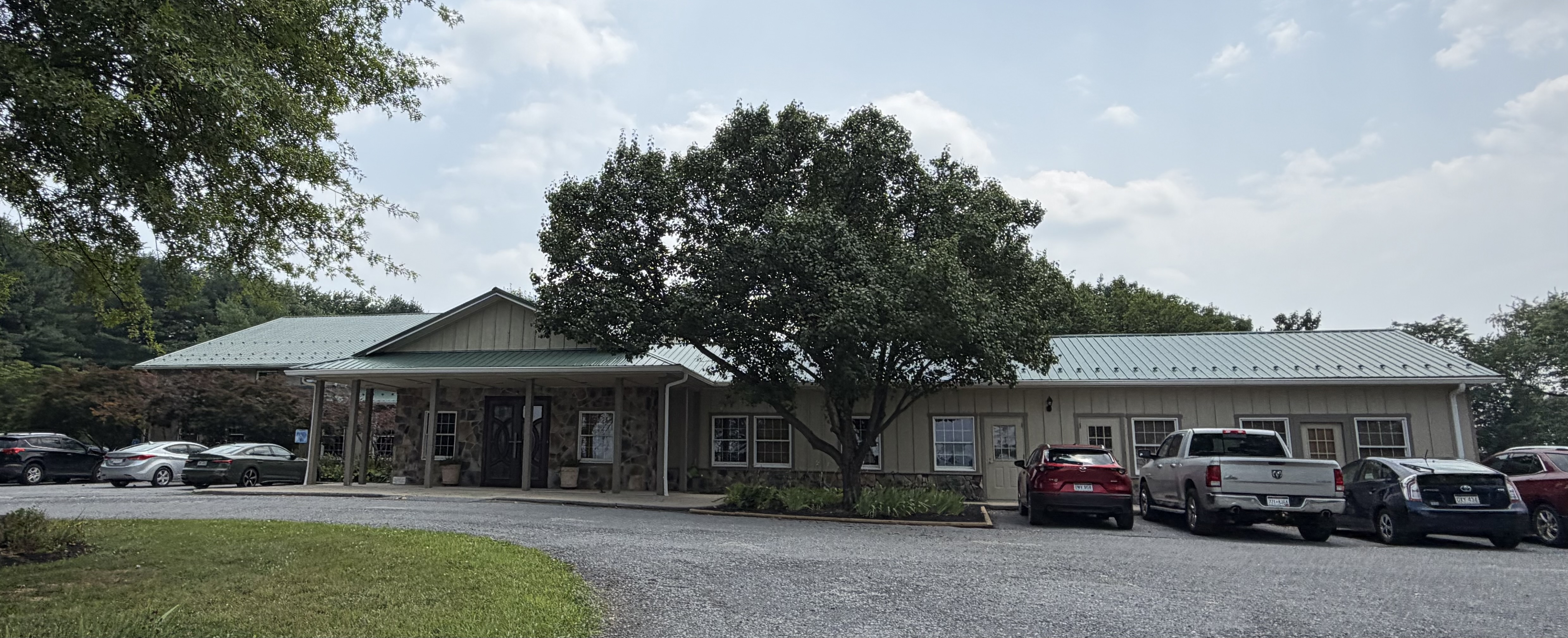
The Church of the Ascension, the cathedral of the Diocese of All Saints in Charles Town, West Virginia

Lipka succeeded Ilgenfritz as bishop ordinary in 2021 and had his cathedral at Holy Trinity Anglican Church in Berlin, Maryland. He was succeeded by Darryl Fitzwater, who moved the cathedral to his parish, the Church of the Ascension, and dropped the "Missionary" part of the diocese's branding. In 2025, the three remaining sisters of the Eastern Province of the ACNA-affiliated Community of St. Mary decided to sell their convent in New York state and accepted Fitzwater's invitation to relocate near the diocesan cathedral. The sisters moved to nearby Shepherdstown in the spring of 2026, with their presence intended to be part of a planned diocesan conference center and shrine to Our Lady of Walsingham.

== Ministries ==
The Diocese of All Saints is one of the ACNA's smaller dioceses, mostly composed of small congregations, many in need of clergy. In addition to hosting the Community of St. Mary, the diocese is home to the Missionaries of St. John the Evangelist, the Daughters of the Holy Cross, and Trinity Hall School of Ministry.

In 2025, the Diocese of All Saints reported 26 congregations (up 4% from 2022), 1,223 members (up 24% from 2022) and an average Sunday attendance of 787 (up 40% from 2022).

== Bishops ordinary ==
1. William Ilgenfritz (2009–2021)
2. Richard Lipka (2021–2025)
3. Darryl Fitzwater (2025–present)
