= Ronald Jackson (bishop) =

- Bishop of the Great Lakes
- Church: Anglican Church in North America
- Diocese: Anglican Diocese of the Great Lakes
- In office: 2016–2020
- Predecessor: Roger Ames
- Successor: Mark Engel

Orders
- Ordination: 1973
- Consecration: January 8, 2016 by Foley Beach
- Laicized: 2020

Personal details
- Education: Nashotah House

Ronald W. Jackson is an American former Anglican bishop. He was the second bishop of the Anglican Diocese of the Great Lakes in the Anglican Church in North America, from 28 April 2016 until he was deposed and relieved of Holy Orders in January 2020, having been found guilty on ecclesiastical charges related to sexual misconduct and immorality. He is married to Patricia, they have four adult children and six grandchildren.

== Ecclesiastical career ==
=== Episcopal Church ===
Jackson studied at Nashotah House, and earned a Doctor of Ministry (DMin) degree at the School of Theology at Claremont, California. He was ordained an Episcopal priest in 1973, at the Episcopal Diocese of Los Angeles. He served in parishes at Ohio, Tennessee and California. He was rector at the Church of St. Luke of the Mountains, La Crescenta, California, from 1992 to 2007. He also did missionary work in India, South America and Africa. He moved to England, where he was chaplain and senior tutor at Trinity College, in Bristol, from 2007 to 2013. He decided to leave the Episcopal Church for the Anglican Church in North America, founded in 2009, due to the former's theological liberalism.

=== Anglican Church in North America ===
He was elected the second bishop of the Anglican Diocese of the Great Lakes, on 8 January 2016, among three candidates, at a College of Bishops meeting of the ACNA. He was consecrated on 28 April 2016, in a ceremony held at St. Bernard's Church, a Roman Catholic church, in Akron, Ohio, by special permission of Bishop Richard Lennon, to accommodate a large crowd of 250 attendants.

Jackson went on administrative leave in November 2019, due to the allegation of misconduct of which he was accused. He resigned in January 2020, for health reasons.

On 2 June 2020, the College of Bishops of ACNA voted to impose the sentence of deposition of the holy orders of ministry on Jackson, after he admitted the use of pornography for many years, and pleaded guilty for the charges of sexual immorality and conduct of scandal or offence. After the removal of his holy orders (laicization), he is no longer able to exercise religious ministry in his denomination.

Anglican Communion titles
Preceded by Roger Ames	II Bishop of the Great Lakes; 2016–2019	Succeeded by John E. Miller III (interim); Mark Engel (diocesan)
