= Fifteenth Lambeth Conference =

2022 assembly of Anglican bishops

15th Lambeth Conference
- Date: 27 July – 7 August 2022
- Venue: Canterbury campus of the University of Kent
- Location: Canterbury, Kent, England, United Kingdom; 51°17′56.43″N 1°3′34.02″E
- Type: Lambeth Conference
- Theme: "God's Church for God's world"
- Organised by: Anglican Communion, Justin Welby (convenor)
- Participants: ~660 Anglican bishops
- Website: lambethconference.org

The fifteenth Lambeth Conference was an assembly of bishops of the Anglican Communion convened by the archbishop of Canterbury, Justin Welby, between 27 July and 7 August 2022. It was the first Lambeth Conference to be held since 2008.

== Background ==
=== Timing and delays ===
The decennial schedule followed since 1948 would have suggested a Lambeth Conference in 2018. In September 2014, Katharine Jefferts Schori, primate of the Episcopal Church in the United States, advised that she had been told by Archbishop Justin Welby that this conference had been cancelled, and that he would not call one until he was "reasonably certain that the vast majority of bishops would attend. It needs to be preceded by a primates meeting at which a vast majority of primates are present" (Schori's words). Welby later responded to reports of cancellation by stating, "As it hasn't been called, it can’t have been cancelled", explaining that he had previously told primates he would not call the Lambeth Conference until he had visited each of them in their own countries, which when added to practical considerations relating to venues precluded a conference as soon as 2018.

The communiqué issued after the primates' meeting in Canterbury in January 2016 said the primates had accepted Welby's proposal that the conference be held in 2020. At the same meeting, the US Episcopal Church was suspended from Anglican Communion decision-making on "issues pertaining to doctrine or polity" for three years because of its support for same-sex marriage, a suspension which would end by the time of the conference.

In 2017 an international organising group chaired by the archbishop of Cape Town set a date (the last week in July 2020) and announced a theme ("God’s Church for God’s world") for the conference. Due to concerns surrounding the COVID-19 pandemic, it was announced in March 2020 that the conference would be rescheduled to summer 2021. In July 2020 it was further announced that due to continued uncertainty caused by the pandemic, the conference would be further delayed to 2022.

=== Prior tension over homosexuality ===
The 1998 and 2008 conferences were marked by disagreements within the Anglican Communion over homosexuality. The 1998 conference adopted Resolution 1.10, which called for a "listening process" but stated, in an amendment passed by a vote of 389–190, that "homosexual practice" (not necessarily orientation) is "incompatible with Scripture".

The 2008 conference avoided reopening this resolution, which nevertheless remained central to controversy within the communion. Several African provinces, along with other bishops opposed to greater tolerance of homosexuality and the blessing of same-sex unions, boycotted the conference. The Global Anglican Future Conference (GAFCON) and Global South Fellowship of Anglican Churches emerged as alternative fora for conservative bishops, with GAFCON meeting for the first time in 2008 and several times over the following years.

By the time of the 2022 conference a faultline was evident between provinces of the communion in the Global North and Global South. Many northern provinces are characterised by declining church attendance, a large number of dioceses (and therefore bishops eligible to attend the conference) relative to the size of their congregations, and a greater openness to homosexuality, including the blessing of same-sex unions, recognition of same-sex marriages, and appointment of openly gay bishops in the most liberal provinces. Many southern provinces are characterised by numerical stability or growth, large dioceses with a correspondingly small number of bishops eligible to attend, and a traditional line on sexuality, holding sexual relations outside of heterosexual marriage to be sinful.

== Attendance ==
The Anglican Communion has not released a list of bishops attending the conference, but media sources estimated attendance at around 660 bishops, 45 ecumenical guests, and 83 bishops' spouses, who participated in a parallel schedule of events. Half of the participants were helped to attend by donations, and many reported difficulty obtaining UK visas.

Bishops in same-sex relationships were invited for the first time, a contrast to the exclusion of Gene Robinson, the first Anglican bishop in an acknowledged same-sex relationship, from the previous conference in 2008. At the time of the invitations, there were Anglican bishops in a same-sex marriage or partnership in at least Canada, England, and the United States. Unlike those in heterosexual marriages, same-sex spouses of bishops were not invited, in an effort to compromise with bishops from more traditionalist or conservative provinces. The organisers explained that this was, in part, because the majority of Anglican provinces only recognise marriages between a man and a woman and do not recognise same-sex unions. In response, the US Episcopal Church and bishops from Canada and the UK publicly disagreed with the decision. In the event, some same-sex spouses were present at or around the conference anyway, though excluded from formal spousal events, and staying in separate accommodation with badges bearing the description "Conference Observer".

The conference was again boycotted by bishops from Nigeria, Rwanda and Uganda, with their primates complaining that the Anglican Communion had "failed to address with remorse and repentance the issues that necessitated our absence" in 2008.

== Lambeth Calls ==
Policy documents proposed for adoption by the conference were ten "Lambeth Calls", a neologism replacing previous written outputs such as the Resolutions of earlier conferences. These had the following titles:

- Mission and Evangelism
- Safe Church — safeguarding and abuse
- Anglican Identity
- Reconciliation — including the legacy of colonialism and wealth acquired through the slave trade
- Human Dignity — including sexuality
- Environment and Sustainable Development
- Christian Unity — ecumenism
- Inter-faith Relations
- Discipleship
- Science and Faith

The Lambeth Calls took the form of declarations the Anglican Communion could then pray, think and reflect on, such that each province could decide on its own response.

The calls were written over several months by working groups in advance of the conference, released within two weeks of its opening, and debated during closed sessions dedicated for each.

=== Abandonment of voting ===
Initially, electronic voting on adoption of the calls was planned, with bishops given the option either to affirm each call or state that it "requires further discernment". After it emerged that the Human Dignity draft reaffirmed 1998's Resolution 1.10, a third option was added for bishops to indicate that a call "does not speak for me". This, however, led to further disquiet within the liberal faction about the possibility that those opposing reaffirmation of Resolution 1.10 could find their votes split between the latter two options. On 31 July, the day allocated for discussion of the second of ten calls, electronic voting was scrapped in favour of a system of voice votes, with no formal recording of numbers in favour of or opposed to each call.

== Programme ==
Bishops began the main programme with a day and half in retreat at Canterbury Cathedral, returning to their main venue, the campus of the University of Kent in Canterbury, on the evening of Friday 29 July for an address by the archbishop of Canterbury. Most of the following days began with morning prayer and Eucharist, followed by press briefings, Bible exposition sessions, and then discussions about each of the Lambeth Calls. A Sunday service was held at Canterbury Cathedral on 31 July, and Wednesday 3 August was an away day at Lambeth Palace in London, with a focus on the Environment and Sustainable Development call. The conference concluded on Sunday 7 August.

== Disagreements over homosexuality ==
The 2022 conference once again included significant controversy about homosexuality and same-sex marriage. The communion's attitude to homosexuality remains the primary locus of disagreement between the bishops.

Conservative bishops led by Justin Badi Arama, archbishop of South Sudan, amongst others, refused to take communion alongside those they viewed as having departed from biblical teaching on homosexuality.

The Human Dignity Lambeth Call bore similarities to Resolution 1.10 from the 1998 conference, which declared gay sex to be a sin. On 2 August 2022, archbishop Welby "affirmed the validity" of Resolution 1.10, saying that it was "not in doubt". Welby's remarks sought to describe the status quo within the Anglican Communion, namely one of division, without attempting a resolution:

[T]here is no attempt to change people’s minds in this Call. It states as a fact that the vast majority of Anglicans in the large majority of Provinces and Dioceses do not believe that a change in teaching is right. Therefore, it is the case that the whole of Lambeth 1.10 1998 still exists. This Call does not in any way question the validity of that resolution. The Call states that many Provinces – and I say again, I think we need to acknowledge it’s the majority – continue to affirm that same-gender marriage is not permissible. The Call also states that other provinces have blessed and welcomed same sex union or marriage, after careful theological reflection and a process of reception. In that way, it states the reality of life in the Communion today.

This prompted criticism from several LGBTQ+ equality activists including Jayne Ozanne and Sandi Toksvig, and the signing by 175 bishops and primates of a pro-LGBTQ statement affirming the holiness of the love of all committed same-sex couples.

The Anglican Communion Office said the session discussing the Human Dignity Lambeth Call had not been about "finding an answer to whether the Anglican Communion is [inclined] one way or another".

The conservative faction of bishops made various attempts to bring reaffirmation of Resolution 1.10 to a vote.

In response to the discourse surrounding sexuality at the Conference, the University of Kent LGBT+ Staff Network organised an 'inclusion march' called the Lambeth Walk, which was attended by over 150 people including LGBT+ bishops and their spouses, followed by the Rainbows in Religion symposium which included guest speakers Jayne Ozanne and Dr Angus M Slater.

== See also ==
- Anglicanism
- Anglican Communion Primates' Meetings — held more frequently than the Lambeth Conference
- Homosexuality and the Anglican Communion
