= Homosexuality and the Anglican Communion =

Since the 1990s, the Anglican Communion has struggled with controversy regarding homosexuality in the church. In 1998, the 13th Lambeth Conference of Anglican bishops passed a resolution "rejecting homosexual practice as incompatible with Scripture". However, this is not legally binding, "though it commends an essential and persuasive view of the attitude of the Communion." "Anglican national churches in Brazil, South Africa, South India, New Zealand and Canada have taken steps toward approving and celebrating same-sex relationships amid strong resistance among other national churches within the 80 million-member global body. The Episcopal Church in the U.S. has allowed same-sex marriage since 2015, and the Scottish Episcopal Church has allowed same-sex marriage since 2017." In 2017, clergy within the Church of England indicated their inclination towards supporting same-sex marriage by dismissing a bishops' report that explicitly asserted the exclusivity of church weddings to unions between a man and a woman. At General Synod in 2019, the Church of England announced that same-gender couples may remain recognised as married after one spouse experiences a gender transition. In 2023, the Church of England announced that it would authorise "prayers of thanksgiving, dedication and for God's blessing for same-sex couples."

In 2002, the Diocese of New Westminster, in the Anglican Church of Canada, permitted the blessing of same-sex unions. In 2003, two openly gay men in England and the United States became candidates for bishop. In the Church of England, Jeffrey John eventually succumbed to pressure to withdraw his name from consideration to be the Bishop of Reading. In the Episcopal Church in the United States, Gene Robinson was elected and consecrated Bishop of New Hampshire, becoming the first openly gay bishop in the Anglican Communion and in apostolic Christianity. This was highly controversial and led several hundred bishops to boycott the 2008 Lambeth Conference. As an alternative to Lambeth, many of these bishops attended the Global Anglican Futures Conference in Jerusalem.

As of 2004, other Anglican provinces, including the Anglican Church of Southern Africa and the Scottish Episcopal Church, permitted the ordination of gay clergy and others, such as the Episcopal Church in the USA, permitted blessing of same-sex unions as well. The BBC, in 2009, reported that many clergy in the Church of England unofficially bless same-sex marriage. In South Africa, the Diocese of Saldanha Bay voted to support blessings for same-sex civil unions. The Anglican Church of Australia's highest court ruled that a diocese may authorise the blessing rites of same-sex unions. In Australia, two dioceses have done so. In 2019, the Southern African Provincial Synod voted to commend for study a proposal allowing each diocese to choose to offer services of prayer for couples in same-sex civil unions.

Many provinces, primarily from the Global South and representing about two-thirds of the 70 million active Anglicans worldwide, have responded to these theological disputes by declaring a state of impaired communion with their Western counterparts. Minority groups in Western provinces have stated their opposition to what they consider un-scriptural actions by the churches in England, Canada, Australia, and the United States. Since 2000, some conservative Global South provinces have appointed missionary bishops to the United States and Canada to provide pastoral oversight to disaffected Anglicans. This process, known as Anglican realignment, is considered by the Episcopal Church USA and the Anglican Church of Canada to be an illegitimate incursion into their territories; however, conservative Anglicans argued that the incursions were necessary because of the failure of these churches to uphold traditional teaching with regard to human sexuality.

As of 2016, "the more liberal provinces that are open to changing Church doctrine on marriage in order to allow same-sex unions include Brazil, Canada, New Zealand, Scotland, South India, South Africa, the US and Wales". In February 2023, the General Synod of Church of England endorsed blessings for same-sex couples. As a result, archbishops from 10 conservative provinces of the Anglican Communion declared a state of "impaired communion" with the Church of England and announced that they no longer recognise the Archbishop of Canterbury as "first among equals" among the bishops of the Anglican Communion.

== Summary of issues ==
There is a wide range of beliefs within the Anglican Communion regarding homosexuality. Some followers believe that heterosexuality or celibacy is required of Christians, but believe in tolerance towards others, whereas other followers believe that LGBT+ Anglicans should be able to marry a person of the same sex in church.

Some Anglicans may choose to identify as "gay", "lesbian", "bisexual", "LGBT+", or "same-sex attracted", or in other ways, depending on their personal beliefs and identity.

Some of the more specific issues under study within member churches and dioceses are:

- Gay, lesbian, bisexual, LGBT+, or same-sex attracted members of the church or communion
  - If they may exist
    - If they must denounce their sexual orientation and strive to become heterosexual (see conversion therapy)
    - If they must renounce same-sex relationships in order to be considered members in good standing
  - If they must be celibate
  - If same-sex unions (such as civil partnerships or civil marriages) of LGBTQ members should be blessed
  - If a church, or any church in the communion, should conduct same-sex marriages.
- Gay, lesbian, bisexual, LGBT+, or same-sex attracted clergy
  - If they may be openly authentic regarding their sexual orientation
    - To what extent they may be "out" (e.g. only to their bishop, partner, spouse, or family, or to the wider public)
    - If they may openly have a partner or spouse
  - If they must be celibate
  - If any of these individuals (those who are celibate and those who are non-celibate) may be bishops

Anglican churches are diverse in their views, from churches which teach that homosexuality is a sin, to churches which do not see homosexuality as sinful, and accept same-sex marriage being open to all members, up to and including bishops. The nature of the Anglican Communion is such that not all churches or dioceses must agree on all issues in order to share a common faith and baptism.

- The bishops of the Anglican Communion in 1998 upheld the traditional Christian teaching that marriage is between a man and a woman and that those who are not called to marriage so defined should remain celibate. A resolution was passed stating that "homosexual acts" are "incompatible with Scripture" by a vote of 526–70; however, it also contained a statement which "calls on all our people to minister pastorally and sensitively to all irrespective of sexual orientation and to condemn irrational fear of homosexuals, violence within marriage and any trivialisation and commercialisation of sex," and noted importantly: "We commit ourselves to listen to the experience of homosexual persons and we wish to assure them that they are loved by God and that all baptised, believing and faithful persons, regardless of sexual orientation, are full members of the Body of Christ." The Lambeth Conference cannot impose doctrine but serves as a discussion forum on controversial issues. Over 100 bishops, including some who voted in favour of the resolution, immediately repudiated it and signed a letter of apology to gay and lesbian Anglicans. However, over 80% of the bishops did not do so.
- In 2002, the Anglican Church of Canada, the Diocese of New Westminster voted to allow the blessing and officiation of same-sex unions and marriages by those parishes who choose to do so.
- In 2003, two openly gay men in England and the United States were nominated to be bishops. Jeffrey John, an openly gay priest in a celibate same-sex relationship, was nominated to be Bishop of Reading, but withdrew his nomination under pressure from conservatives. Gene Robinson was consecrated the Bishop of the Diocese of New Hampshire and became the first openly gay and non-celibate bishop in the Anglican Communion, sparking controversy and causing some churches to impair communion with The Episcopal Church.
- The Church of England affirmed in 2005 that lay members who have entered into civil partnerships with persons of the same sex are still eligible for the sacraments of baptism, confirmation, and communion.
- Also in 2005, the Church of England permitted priests to register a same-sex civil partnership provided they expect to be asked to follow the House of Bishops guidelines.
- The Church of Nigeria and the Church of Uganda criticised the Church of England for allowing same-sex civil partnerships.
- The Anglican Church of Nigeria issued a statement in 2006 affirming their rejection of homosexuality and asking the National Assembly to prohibit it.
- Sexual orientation, specifically the consecration of Gene Robinson, was a major issue at the 2008 Lambeth Conference. A group of conservative bishops opposed to the ordination and marriage of same-sex attracted people, including many from the "global south", gathered in June 2008 at the Global Anglican Future Conference.
- In 2013, in the Church of England, "The House [of Bishops] has confirmed that clergy in civil partnerships, and living in accordance with the teaching of the Church on human sexuality, can be considered as candidates for the episcopate."
- In 2016, it was made public that the Church of England had consecrated Nicholas Chamberlain, Bishop suffragan of Grantham, knowing he was gay and in a long-term same-sex relationship. Chamberlain, who is a suffragan bishop of the Diocese of Lincoln, is the first Anglican bishop in England to come out as gay.
- GAFCON, an association of conservative Anglican churches, called the appointment of the first openly gay bishop in England a "major error".
- The Church of England rebuked GAFCON and "pointed out clergy were allowed to enter civil partnerships and could offer prayers of support for same-sex couples".
- In April 2017, GAFCON announced that it is appointing a missionary bishop "for conservative Christians in Europe, bypassing Anglican Churches in England and Scotland".
- In 2022 at the Lambeth Conference 175 bishops signed a statement affirming the holiness of committed love of same-gender couples.
- In February 2023, the Archbishop's Council of Church of England allowed blessing ceremony for same-sex couples. As a consequence, archbishops from 10 of the 42 provinces of the global Anglican Communion (South Sudan, Chile, the Indian Ocean, Congo, Myanmar, Bangladesh, Uganda, Sudan, Alexandria and Melanesia) declared they no longer recognize the leadership of the archbishop of Canterbury.

== Bishops ==
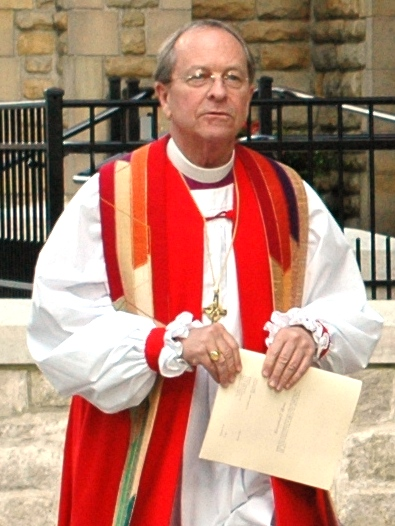
Gene Robinson, Bishop of New Hampshire

=== 1973 Archbishop of York's statement ===
While serving as Archbishop of York, Donald Coggan declared on BBC radio in 1973 that many Anglican clergymen were homosexuals and calling for them to be treated with understanding.

=== 1998 Lambeth Conference of Anglican bishops ===
Regarding "human sexuality", the 1998 Lambeth Conference of Anglican bishops said that it upholds "faithfulness in marriage between a man and a woman in lifelong union, and believes that abstinence is right for those who are not called to marriage". Furthermore, it refused to "advise the legitimising or blessing of same sex unions nor ordaining those involved in same gender unions".

=== 1999 Cambridge Accord ===
In response to the division following the Lambeth Conference of the previous year, most Church of England bishops (although not including George Carey, then Archbishop of Canterbury), and many others elsewhere in the Anglican Communion, agreed in 1999 on a document that upheld the human rights of homosexual people, while recognising and not seeking to resolve division over the morality of homosexual acts.

=== Gene Robinson consecrated bishop ===
In August 2003 the Episcopal Diocese of New Hampshire elected an openly gay and partnered priest, Gene Robinson, as bishop. This came shortly after a similar controversy in England when an openly gay priest, Canon Jeffrey John, was appointed to become the Suffragan Bishop of Reading. Eventually, however, John agreed to withdraw in order to avoid division. In 2004, in the aftermath of Robinson's election as bishop, John was installed as Dean of St Albans, the cathedral there being the site of England's first Christian martyr.

=== 2003 Lambeth Palace meeting ===
As a result of the controversy over the ordination of gay bishops and the blessing of same-sex unions, on 15 October 2003, Anglican leaders from around the world met in Lambeth Palace in an attempt to avoid a schism on the issue. The day after, they released a lengthy statement:

We must make clear that recent actions in New Westminster and in the Episcopal Church (USA) do not express the mind of our Communion as a whole, and these decisions jeopardise our sacramental fellowship with each other. [...]

If his [Gene Robinson's] consecration proceeds, we recognise that we have reached a crucial and critical point in the life of the Anglican Communion and we have had to conclude that the future of the Communion itself will be put in jeopardy. [...]

In this case, the ministry of this one bishop will not be recognised by most of the Anglican world, and many provinces are likely to consider themselves to be out of Communion with the Episcopal Church (USA). This will tear the fabric of our Communion at its deepest level, and may lead to further division on this and further issues as provinces have to decide in consequence whether they can remain in communion with provinces that choose not to break communion with the Episcopal Church (USA). [...]

Similar considerations apply to the situation pertaining in the Diocese of New Westminster. We commend the report of that Conference in its entirety to all members of the Anglican Communion, valuing especially its emphasis on the need to listen to the experience of homosexual persons, and [...] to assure them that they are loved by God and that all baptised, believing and faithful persons, regardless of sexual orientation, are full members of the Body of Christ"; and its acknowledgement of the need for ongoing study on questions of human sexuality.

=== Statements from Rowan Williams ===
In 2004, Rowan Williams, Archbishop of Canterbury, wrote a letter to Anglican churches worldwide in which he condemned comments by bishops outside the Western world for inciting violence against gay men and women.

Any words that could make it easier for someone to attack or abuse a homosexual person are words of which we must repent. Do not think repentance is always something others are called to, but acknowledge the failings we all share, sinful and struggling disciples as we are.

=== Subsequent division ===
Bishops from two Anglican provinces, the Province of Rwanda and the Province of South East Asia, consecrated missionary bishops for the United States in January 2000 and formally established the Anglican Mission in America (now called the Anglican Mission in the Americas) later that year. In 2010, a similar jurisdiction created by the Reformed Episcopal Church and former members and congregations of the Episcopal Church in the USA was officially launched. Four dioceses which withdrew from the Episcopal Church account for the majority of the nearly 700 congregations affiliated with this church, the Anglican Church in North America. These two bodies—AMiA and ACNA—reject the creation of rites for same-sex unions as well as the ordination of openly gay people. Neither is a member of the Anglican Communion at present (see Anglican realignment).

Bishops in Uganda cut relations with the Diocese of New Hampshire following Robinson's consecration on 2 November 2003. The Church of Nigeria declared itself in "impaired communion" with the Episcopal Church on 2 November 2003, and nine days later announced it was planning to establish a United States branch of its province to support Nigerian Anglicans living in the U.S., the Convocation of Anglicans in North America. The Province of South East Asia broke communion with the Episcopal Church on 20 November 2003, citing Robinson's consecration as the reason for its action.

=== Windsor Report and 2005 Primates Meeting ===
In 2004, the Lambeth Commission on Communion issued a report on homosexuality in the Anglican Communion, which became known as the Windsor Report. This report recommended a moratorium on further consecrations of openly gay bishops and blessings of same-sex unions and marriages. It stopped short of recommending discipline against the Episcopal Church or Anglican Church of Canada.

=== Apology by 184 bishops ===
A "Pastoral Statement to Lesbian and Gay Anglicans from Some Member Bishops of the Lambeth Conference," dated 5 August 1998, was sponsored by Ronald H. Haines, Bishop of Washington. The statement apologised to Lesbian and Gay Anglicans for the Windsor Report and for the fact that their voices were not heard by the Conference. By 30 October 1998, the statement had been co-signed by 183 bishops representing every continent except Antarctica.

=== 2005 Primates' Meeting ===
In February 2005, the Primates of the Anglican Communion held a regular meeting at Dromantine in Northern Ireland at which sexual orientation was heavily discussed. Of the 38 Primates, 35 attended. The Primates issued a communiqué that reiterated most of the Windsor Report's statements, but added a new twist. Both the Episcopal Church and the Anglican Church of Canada were asked to voluntarily withdraw from the Anglican Consultative Council, the main formal international entity within the Anglican Communion until the next Lambeth Conference in 2008.

=== 2007 Primates' Meeting ===
The "Communiqué of the Primates' Meeting, February 2007" (Sec 17, 4) asserted its "belief that The Episcopal Church has departed from the standard of teaching on human sexuality accepted by the Communion in the 1998 Lambeth Resolution 1.10 by consenting to the episcopal election of a candidate living in a committed same-sex relationship, and by permitting Rites of Blessing for same-sex unions. The episcopal ministry of a person living in a same-sex relationship is not acceptable to the majority of the Communion."

=== Consecration of Mary Douglas Glasspool ===
In December 2009, the Diocese of Los Angeles elected Mary Douglas Glasspool, a lesbian priest with a female partner as a suffragan bishop. She was consecrated on 15 May 2010. Leaders from 20 Anglican provinces meeting in Singapore in April 2010 declared that the election and intended consecration of Glasspool represented "a total disregard for the mind of the Communion".

=== 2016 Primates' Meeting ===
A majority of the primates voted to discipline the Episcopal Church for revising its canons and marriage rites allowing same-sex marriage.

The primates' communiqué included these words:

It is our unanimous desire to walk together. However given the seriousness of these matters we formally acknowledge this distance by requiring that for a period of three years The Episcopal Church no longer represent us on ecumenical and interfaith bodies, should not be appointed or elected to an internal standing committee and that while participating in the internal bodies of the Anglican Communion, they will not take part in decision making on any issues pertaining to doctrine or polity.

The communiqué condemned "homophobic prejudice and violence and resolved to work together to offer pastoral care and loving service irrespective of sexual orientation".

==== Archbishop of Canterbury apologises ====
Shortly after the meeting of the Anglican primates, Justin Welby, Archbishop of Canterbury, held a press conference in which he apologised "to lesbian, gay, bisexual and transgender people for the hurt and pain they have experienced by the Anglican Communion over the years".

=== Lambeth 2022 ===
In preparation of the Lambeth 2020 conference (the conference would be eventually delayed to 2022), Welby and Josiah Idowu-Fearon (Secretary General of the Anglican Consultative Council) announced that bishops in same-sex marriages and partnerships would be invited to Lambeth. This was the first time that bishops in same-sex partnerships were invited. At the time of the invitations, there were Anglican bishops in a same-sex marriage or partnership in Canada, England, and the United States. However, the spouses and partners of the bishops were not invited in an effort to compromise with bishops from more traditionalist or conservative provinces, and the organising archbishops explained that this was, in part, because the majority of Anglican provinces only recognise marriages between a man and a woman and do not recognise same-sex unions. In response, The Episcopal Church and bishops from Canada and the UK publicly disagreed with the decision. On the other side, bishops from more conservative Anglican provinces threatened to boycott Lambeth 2020 over the inclusion of married and partnered gay and lesbian bishops, and the bishops from Nigeria, Rwanda, and Uganda will not be in attendance. GAFCON argued that "same-sex partnered bishops" should not be included and that, instead, traditionalist bishops should be invited. Finally, at Lambeth 2022, 175 bishops and primates signed a statement affirming the holiness of the love of all same-sex couples.

=== February 2023: General Synod of Church of England ===
In February 2023, the General Synod of Church of England voted to approve of blessings for same-sex couples during ordinary church services, following a civil marriage or civil partnership.

== Differing stances ==
Within the Anglican Communion there is diverse opinion over sexual orientation.

=== Church of England ===
The Church of England has been discussing human sexuality, same-sex unions, and marriage. In 2023, the House of Bishops and General Synod approved of blessings for same-sex couples following a civil partnership or civil marriage. The commended prayers to bless same-sex couples, "Prayers of Love and Faith," may be used during regular church services while "standalone" services of blessing will require additional steps for approval. In December 2023, the first blessings approved for use during a regular church service took place. The canons of the Church of England currently state that "marriage is in its nature a union permanent and lifelong... of one man with one woman, to the exclusion of all others on either side", and consequently teaches that Holy Matrimony can only be between one man and one woman. The Church of England has also maintained the position that it supports celibate same-sex relationships including civil partnership. The House of Bishops and Archbishop's Council communicated that "The Church of England recognises that same-sex relationships often embody fidelity and mutuality. Civil partnerships enable these Christian virtues to be recognised socially and legally in a proper framework." A spokesperson for the Church of England, has reiterated that "the church has no truck with homophobia and even supports clergy who are in civil partnerships...(But) the Church of England's doctrine on marriage is [that it is between a man and a woman]." The current position, stated in 2014, of the House of Bishops is that it is not "willing for those who are in a same-sex marriage to be ordained to any of the three orders of ministry". At General Synod in July 2019, the church announced that same-gender couples may remain and be recognised as married when one spouse experiences gender transition provided that the spouses identified as opposite genders at the time of the marriage.

==== Before 2000 ====
In 1979, the church publication Homosexual Relationships: A contribution to discussion appeared, but was "considered too liberal by many in the church".

In 1989, a report to the House of Bishops by June Osborne, member of the Board for Social Responsibility, summarized direct testimony from lesbian and gay Christians. In 1990, the report was leaked, creating pressure for an official response to its topic.

In December 1991, the House of Bishops issued Issues in Human Sexuality. The conclusion of the document listed questions for reflection. According to the document, same-sex monogamous relationships were acceptable for lay people but not clergy. On the tenth anniversary of the publication of Issues in Human Sexuality, Michael Bourke, Bishop suffragan of Wolverhampton, wrote that "Issues aspired to help forward a debate on the subject", but rather than serving its stated purpose, "Issues has been presented as a consensus to which all bishops are expected to subscribe. Instead of enabling open and charitable discussion, it has served as an instrument of management and control."

==== 2000–2009 ====
The issue of human sexuality erupted when Jeffrey John, an openly gay priest, was elected area Bishop of Reading in May 2003. Before he could take up his post there was strong opposition from a minority of bishops and he was persuaded to not proceed with the appointment. However, many senior bishops have voiced disappointment at his decision to resign. Later in 2004 he was installed as Dean of St Albans. Further controversy erupted when churches in the Diocese of St Albans decided that they would withhold contributions until further notice to protest this appointment. St. Peter and Paul's Church in Cranfield, near Bedford, and Holy Trinity Church in New Barnet, north of Greater London, pledged to withhold money from diocesan funds in protest. St Andrew's Church in the Hertfordshire town of Chorleywood also announced that it would withhold funds until further notice. Yet, in 2002, reporters confirmed that hundreds of same-sex blessings occur, although unofficially, every year.

In 2004, "the majority of Bishops who voted during the whole passage of the Civil Partnerships Act through [the] Lordships' House were in favour of civil partnerships." Eight bishops voted in favour of civil unions and two voted against the passage of the Act.

On 25 July 2005, the House of Bishops issued a pastoral statement on the "implications of the Civil Partnerships" which came into force on 5 December 2005. The statement reaffirmed "the Church's teaching on both marriage and sexual intercourse". It also noted that "the new legislation makes no change to the law in relation to marriage". The statement went on to say that "clergy of the Church of England should not provide services of blessing for those who register a civil partnership". However, it said that if clergy are "approached by people asking for prayer in relation to entering into a civil partnership," they should "respond pastorally and sensitively". Regarding clergy themselves, "entering into a civil partnership" was not considered "intrinsically incompatible with holy orders, provided the person concerned is willing to give assurances to his or her bishop that the relationship is consistent with the standards for the clergy set out in Issues in Human Sexuality (House of Bishops, December 1991)." "The House of Bishops considers it would be a matter of social injustice to exclude from ministry those who are faithful to the teaching of the Church, and who decide to register a civil partnership." However, the statement said that "lay people who have registered civil partnerships ought not to be asked to give assurances about the nature of their relationship before being admitted to baptism, confirmation and communion."

On 21 December 2005, in another controversial act which was contrary to the House of Bishops' pastoral statement, David Jenkins, former Bishop of Durham, offered a blessing for a vicar who had entered into a same-sex partnership.

In February 2007, the General Synod of the Church of England adopted a motion. In part it read that nothing should be done "that could be perceived as the Church of England qualifying its commitment to the entirety of the relevant Lambeth Conference Resolutions". At Lambeth Conference 1998, homosexuality was that the most hotly debated issue. Its Resolution 1.10 stated in an amendment passed by a vote of 389–190 that "homosexual practice" is "incompatible with Scripture".

In 2008, in spite of the action by the General Synod, St Bartholomew's Church in London offered a rite of blessing for two priests entering into a same-sex civil partnership. Nevertheless, other dioceses and parishes supported the inclusion of gay and lesbian priests. In 2008, the Diocese of London provided guidelines saying "clergy [...] may use a form of service they consider suitable in respect of a civil partnership." In London, some churches have dedication services for civil partnerships.

==== 2010–2014 ====
In 2011, the General Synod voted to extend pensions and employee benefits to gay and lesbian priests living with their partners in civil unions.

In January 2012, the House of Bishops of the Church of England commissioned a Working Group on Human Sexuality. The working group included Joseph Pilling chairman, four bishops and three advisers. Also in 2012, John Sentamu, Archbishop of York, said he sees marriage as heterosexual, but that "[civil partnerships] are in every respect in ethical terms an honourable contract of a committed relationship."

In 2012, David Ison, Dean of St Paul's, announced his support for same-sex marriage and said that he had officiated at blessings or prayer services for same-sex couples. Changing Attitude UK, an affirming group of clergy, laity, and churches within the Church of England, provides a list of prayer services allowed including a "Service of Celebration following a Civil Partnership". Colin Fletcher, Acting Bishop of Oxford, gave permission for at least one same-sex celebration to be officiated by a Church of England priest who presided for the high-profile ceremony for Mpho Tutu and her partner. The Diocese of Southwark is another example of offering inclusive services. In 2017, the Southwark Cathedral hosted a celebration for a same-sex civil partnership. York Minster Cathedral also welcomes same-sex couples in civil partnerships for prayer.

In January 2013, the House of Bishops ruled that priests in same-sex civil partnerships could be consecrated as bishops.

In April 2013, the Church of England's Faith and Order Commission, in a missive to clergy, also communicated that "there was a need for committed same-sex couples to be given recognition and 'compassionate attention' from the Church, including special prayers." In November 2013, the Report of the Working Group on Human Sexuality (nicknamed the Pilling Report) was published. It said that the Church should "stand firmly" against "homophobic attitudes" and should repent "for the lack of welcome and acceptance extended to homosexual people in the past, and to demonstrate the unconditional acceptance and love of God in Christ for all people". The report's key recommendation was "that the church's internal dialogue on the subject of human sexuality might best be addressed through a process of conversations across the church and involving others in the Anglican Communion". This recommendation was endorsed and acted on by the church as recounted later in this section. Also, in 2013, some in the Church of England planned a liturgical blessing of gay couples.

In January 2014, the College of Bishops endorsed the Pilling Report recommendation about process of conversations on the issue of homosexuality.

After the legalisation of same-sex marriages, the Church of England communicated that "the option of civil partnership should remain open for same-sex couples."

In February 2014, the House of Bishops decreed the following:

- No special services of blessing for married same-sex couples, but allowed "more informal kinds of prayer, at the request of the couple [but this should] be accompanied by pastoral discussion of the Church's teaching and [the couple's] reasons for departing from it".
- Clergy will not be allowed to enter same-sex marriages.
- Clergy of the same sex are allowed by the Church to enter civil partnerships, but only on the understanding that they will remain celibate.

Still, "gay couples who get married will be able to ask for special prayers in the Church of England after their wedding, the bishops have agreed". As such, some congregations have offered "Prayers for a Same Sex Commitment". Moreover, "Bishops have little power to prevent gay clergy from marrying nor to sack them if they do. A panel of three senior bishops has been set up to advise other bishops on how to apply the guidance when clergy dissent. The usual format is an informal letter of rebuke and no further action, meaning more and more clergy are choosing to marry their same-sex partners." In April 2014, the Archbishop's Council and House of Bishops asked that the government to continue to offer civil partnerships.

In September 2014, the College of Bishops met for three days. "Two of the days were devoted to the first of a series of shared conversations in the Church of England on Sexuality, Scripture and Mission. As part of the conversations the college shared the different responses being expressed in the life of the church and the deeply held convictions and experiences that inform them." Also in September 2014, Tim Stevens, Bishop of Leicester, confirmed that a service of thanksgiving for a same-sex civil partnership contravened no rules.

Andrew Cain (now Andrew Foreshew-Cain), Vicar of St Mary's Church, Kilburn and St James' Church West, in North London planned to defy the House of Bishops' ban and bless same-sex marriages, as did a few others. Weighing in on the issue, Justin Welby, Archbishop of Canterbury, avoided taking a position on blessing same-sex marriages but did endorse civil gay marriages and prayer ceremonies to mark the important occasion for same-sex couples. Some congregations and clergy, such as St John's Church in Waterloo in South London, have begun to invite same-sex couples to receive thanksgiving services for civil marriages. Same-sex attracted people who are ordained deacons, priests and bishops are forbidden to marry someone of the same sex and same-sex attracted people who are married to someone of the same sex are forbidden to be ordained. Ben Bradshaw MP wanted the position of the Church of England clarified. Specifically, he demanded to know if Church of England clergy who married a same-sex partner would be disciplined or defrocked. Gay people, including those in same-sex civil partnerships, are allowed to become clerics but are expected to remain celibate. The Huffington Post wrote in a 2014 article that gay clergy who enter into same-sex marriage or bless same-sex marriages risk being defrocked and losing their jobs. Seven clerics planned to marry regardless, defying their bishops. Some Church of England bishops, however, fully accept and embrace gay clergy with partners or spouses in their diocese while other bishops remove the licences of such clergy, making it extremely difficult for them to find a position in another diocese. On 12 April 2014, Jeremy Pemberton married Laurence Cunnington, thus becoming the first priest in the Church of England to defy the church's ban on the marriage of gay clergy. Also in 2014, an openly lesbian and trans priest was appointed as a minor canon in Manchester Cathedral.

==== 2015–2019 ====
In 2015, John Sentamu, Archbishop of York, told a lay preacher, Jeremy Timm, that if he persisted with plans to marry his long-time partner, his licence to preach in Anglican churches would be revoked. As of August 2015, an agreement was reached: Timm would complete existing preaching commitments before revocation. Timm announced his plans to be married in September 2015 and to leave the Church of England and join "Contemplative Fire", a dispersed, diverse and inclusive group that is primarily Anglican.

Other bishops and dioceses have supported same-gender marriage and have advocated for the right of gay priests to marry. For example, Nick Holtam, Bishop of Salisbury, endorsed same-sex marriage following its passage. In December 2015, Alan Wilson, area Bishop of Buckingham, announced his support for same-gender marriage within the church. In 2016, another priest, in the Diocese of Southwark, converted his civil partnership into marriage and remained a priest. The Church Times also reported that St. Agnes in North Riddish held a "service of blessing" and "ceremony of commitment" for a priest who had resigned to marry his partner. The Diocese in Europe also reported the marriage of a same-gender couple that took place in a Lutheran church in Denmark. The Diocese of Chichester featured Gay Pride in Brighton and encouraged participation. Also, the Diocese of Lichfield launched a congregation especially to reach out to LGBTI people. Paul Bayes, Bishop of Liverpool, has called for the church to be more inclusive of same-gender relationships. In 2018, the Diocese of St Edmundsbury and Ipswich appointed Joe Hawes, who is in a civil partnership, as Dean of St Edmundsbury. Later, the Diocese of Lichfield communicated support for "radical Christian inclusion" and that churches should welcome and honour LGBTI people. Andrew Foreshew-Cain, who entered into a same-sex marriage, continued in his position at St. Mary's Church, Kilburn and St. James' Church West in North London, but was prohibited from any other diocesan positions within the Church of England; however, in 2018, and due to the unique status of Church of England university chaplaincies, Foreshew-Cain was appointed as the Chaplain for the University of Oxford's Lady Margaret Hall, the first priest in a same-sex marriage appointed to the chaplaincy.

In 2016, the General Synod announced that, in response to the growing support for gay marriage, it will reconsider allowing blessing rites for same-gender couples entering into marriage. Additionally, an openly married gay priest was elected to the 2016 General Synod representing a historic moment for gay rights in the church.

From 10 to 12 July 2016, following the prorogation of the meeting of the General Synod, most "members met in an informal setting in which they listened and were heard as they reflected together on scripture and a changing culture in relation to their understanding of human sexuality".

The Church of England's official Statement after the synod's members completed their informal reflections said that "the Shared Conversations over the last two years now come to a conclusion with over 1300 members of the church directly involved. It is our hope that what has been learned through the relationships developed will inform the way the church conducts whatever further formal discussions may be necessary in the future."

In September 2016, Nicholas Chamberlain, Bishop of Grantham, announced that he is gay and in a celibate relationship with his male partner, becoming the first bishop to do so in the Anglican church. Following Chamberlain's coming out, he "received high-level support from the most senior official in the Anglican communion" as the Secretary General, Dr Josiah Idowu-Fearon, said that "the Anglican Communion has never made sexual orientation a condition of eligibility to hold office within the church and I reject the suggestion that it has".

In November, 2016, William Nye, the Secretary General of the Archbishop's Council, confirmed the following:

- clergy in the Church of England may enter a civil partnership because this does not conflict with the doctrine on marriage
- clergy may offer "prayers of support" on behalf of same-sex couples following a civil partnership or civil marriage
- churches and congregations can publicly share that they are welcoming of LGBT people
- clergy and the laity alike are able to advocate for a change in doctrine

On 15 January 2017, Rachel Treweek, Bishop of Gloucester, presided over an "LGBT Eucharist" sponsored by Inclusive Church.

During the General Synod of February 2017, the House of Clergy voted against the motion to 'take note' of a conservative position on marriage. As a result of needing a majority in all three houses, the General Synod rejected the motion. Following the rejection of the 'take note' motion, the Archbishops of Canterbury and of York called for the need of a "radical new Christian inclusion" that is "founded in Scripture, in reason, in tradition, in theology and the Christian faith as the Church of England has received it; it must be based on good, healthy, flourishing relationships, and in a proper 21st century understanding of being human and of being sexual". In June 2017, the two Archbishops announced the appointment of a Pastoral Advisory Group and an Episcopal Teaching Document Group. The Pastoral Advisory Group aims to support and advise dioceses on the "current pastoral approach of the Church to human sexuality", with a focus on same-sex couples; the chair is Christine Hardman, Bishop of Newcastle. The Episcopal Teaching Document Group aims to create a "major teaching document on marriage and sexuality" to be endorsed by the House of Bishops; the chair is Christopher Cocksworth, Bishop of Coventry. The group subsequently became the Living in Love and Faith (LLF) project. The enabling officer for the project is Dr Eeva John. It reported progress to General Synod in February 2019 and February 2020.

In October 2017, the Diocese of Hereford voted in favour of a motion supporting liturgies for same-sex couples to dedicate a civil partnership or civil marriage in church; the General Synod is set to discuss the motion. In 2022, "The House [of Bishops] also agreed to the formation of a Pastoral Consultative Group to support and advise dioceses on pastoral responses to circumstances that arise concerning LGBTI+ clergy, ordinands, lay leaders and the lay people in their care."

On 12 February 2018, the Church of England's Education Office published a policy supporting sex education which includes, among other things, education concerning one's sexual desire. The policy stated that "Sex education should include an understanding that all humans are sexual beings and that sexual desire is natural. Pupils should be taught that humans express their sexuality differently and that there is diversity in sexual desire."

==== Since 2020 ====
In November 2020, the Living in Love and Faith group published its resources. The resources include videos, podcasts, an online learning hub, a five-week course, and a 480-page book Living in Love and Faith: Christian teaching and learning about identity, sexuality, relationships and marriage. The book aims to describe all opinions on sexuality fairly and clearly, and to interrogate them in context of scripture, science, culture, and lived experience. Writing about the book, a Church Times editorial declared: "it's out, it's long, it's good". Responding to the publication of the resources, various pressure groups agreed that churches should welcome LGBTI people, but differed on how that should be accomplished.

In September 2022, the Church of England marked the beginning of a period of "discernment and decision-making" by publishing three documents that report the experiences of those in the process.

Also that month, the Diocese of Hereford refused a request to allow Mpho Tutu van Furth, an Anglican priest, to conduct a funeral in the diocese because she is married to a woman. Former Bishop of Liverpool Paul Bayes criticised the decision and said: "We urgently need to make space for conscience, space for pastoral care, and space for love". Ben Bradshaw, Labour MP for Exeter, described the refusal as "cruelty" and said the church was "actively pursuing a campaign of discrimination" against lesbian and gay people; he said the church must act quickly to allow same-sex marriage or face parliamentary questions about its position as the established church.

In October 2022, Canterbury Cathedral announced that David Monteith, who is gay and in a civil partnership, had been appointed to serve as the next Cathedral Dean; Justin Welby, the Archbishop of Canterbury, commented saying, “I’m delighted by David’s appointment as Dean of Canterbury."

In November 2022, Steven Croft (Bishop of Oxford) became the most senior Church of England figure to back same-sex marriage, saying clergy should be free to bless or marry same-sex partners and to enter into a same-sex marriage themselves, in contrast to the Church's official position. His statement was supported by suffragan bishops of the Diocese of Oxford: Alan Wilson, Olivia Graham and Gavin Collins. The same month, John Inge (Bishop of Worcester) and Martin Gorick (Bishop of Dudley) sent an open letter to clergy in the Diocese of Worcester that stated that "the time has come for the Church to celebrate and honour same sex relations" and called "for same sex couples to be able to be married in Church".

In January 2023, the House of Bishops of the Church of England announced it would be proposing the introduction of blessings for same-sex couples at the next meeting of the General Synod, known as "Prayers of Love and Faith", but that the Church's teachings in relation to marriage, i.e. one man and one woman, would not change:

This resource will offer clergy a variety of flexible ways to affirm and celebrate same-sex couples in church, and will include prayers of dedication, thanksgiving and for God’s blessing. It could be used for a couple who have marked a significant stage in the development of their relationship, sealed a covenanted friendship, registered a civil partnership, or entered a civil marriage. [...] The use of these prayers will be entirely discretionary: clergy may choose to use some combination of these prayers or not to use them at all. These Prayers of Love and Faith will not be the same as conducting a marriage in church. They will not alter the Church of England's celebration of Holy Matrimony, which remains the lifelong union of one man and one woman, as set forth in its canons and authorised liturgies.

In February 2023 Anglican churches in a few developing countries, South Sudan, Uganda and the Democratic Republic of the Congo among others, announced they no longer accept Justin Welby as leader of the worldwide church due to the issue.

On 1 November 2023, 44 Church of England bishops (15 diocesan bishops and 29 suffragan bishops) signed an open letter supporting the use of the Prayers of Love and Faith (i.e. blessings for same-sex couples) and called for "Guidance being issued without delay that includes the removal of all restrictions on clergy entering same-sex civil marriages, and on bishops ordaining and licensing such clergy". On November 15, 2023, the General Synod accepted both the commended prayers of blessing for same-sex couples during regular church services, and also approved an amendment to authorise "standalone" blessings for same-sex couples on a trial basis with permanent adoption of the "standalone" blessings requiring additional steps. The House of Bishops voted on 12 December 2023 to authorise the Prayers of Love and Faith for use in regular services from 17 December 2023. In July 2024, the General Synod voted to pass proposals that would permit same-sex civil marriage ceremonies between members of the clergy.

=== Church of Ireland ===
Within the Church of Ireland there is a wide spectrum of opinion. The Bishops' 2002 Pastoral Letter identified four viewpoints present in the Church, ranging from opposition to acceptance of same-gender relationships. Conservatives expressed great concern about the blessing of the relationship of a lesbian couple in St. Nicolas' Collegiate Church, Galway in September 2002. The Rector of the parish, Patrick Towers, told the press, "I refuse to do weddings of same gender couples as they simply don't exist. But I am always very happy to look favourably on anyone seeking a blessing, be it for divorced couples, animals or friendships. It was a standard blessing, one I wrote myself, based on the Claddagh ring theme."

There was also widespread concern within the Church of Ireland at the Bishop of Limerick's attendance at Gene Robinson's consecration. Views at parish level reflect this, with many evangelical parishes as well as those in the more populous (in terms of Church of Ireland membership) north being generally opposed to LGBT identities, while middle and high church parishes, especially in the south, have openly gay parishioners as a matter of routine. For example, at General Synod 2005, Dean Michael Burrows (now a bishop) stated that he regularly gives Holy Communion to same-sex attracted parishioners in long-standing relationships. Moreover, many of the church's congregations, including seven cathedrals, are publicly and officially affirming of same-sex couples.

The bishops have announced a process of listening and reflection within the church. A preliminary response to the Windsor Report was produced by the Standing Committee of the General Synod in January 2005. Most of the northern dioceses passed motions favouring the Lambeth Conference's Resolution I.10, although a similar motion failed to receive overall endorsement in the Diocese of Connor, covering most of County Antrim. Then, in 2010, the denomination recorded that a congregation within the church had received the 'Straight-up' Rebel award, an LGBT award, for its special services for LGBTI people.

"The Church of Ireland has not taken a formal stance on the issue" of civil partnerships. In 2008, "the Church of Ireland Pensions Board has confirmed that it will treat civil partners the same as spouses", in line with legal and financial requirements. In 2011, a senior priest in the Church of Ireland entered into a same-sex civil partnership and the relationship was celebrated by his community. Unlike the Church of England, clergy entered into a civil union "without being asked for any assurances regarding lifestyle". Since then, other priests have been taking the time and opportunity to come out about their experiences. In 2012, the church's Clergy Pension Fund recognised that "the pension entitlement of a member’s registered civil partner will be the same as that of a surviving spouse."

The General Synod in 2012 made provision for a Working Group on Human Sexuality to be created, to encourage and monitor Conversations at parochial and diocesan level, and between dioceses of different perspectives. The same motion reaffirmed the existing teaching of the Church of Ireland in relation to marriage and sexuality: "marriage is part of God's creation and a holy mystery in which one man and one woman become one flesh... The Church of Ireland recognises for itself and of itself, no other understanding of marriage".

In 2015, Paul Colton, Bishop of Cork, announced his support of same-sex marriage, becoming the first Church of Ireland bishop to do so, saying that "The events in society are moving very rapidly and the church is not at all up to pace with the debate." Following Colton, two retired Archbishops of Dublin also voiced their 'yes' vote in favour of same-sex marriages. Michael Burrows, Bishop of Cashel and Ossory, also endorsed same-sex marriage. While opposing gay marriage, Pat Storey, Bishop of Meath and Kildare and Ireland's first woman bishop, did endorse and express support for same-sex civil unions. On 23 May 2015, the people of Republic of Ireland voted in favour of the legalisation of same-sex marriage, the first country to do such by popular vote. In 2016, the Church of Ireland released a pastoral letter offering guidelines on same-gender marriage. Although the Church of Ireland does not currently offer marriage or blessing rites, the guidelines allow priests to offer pastoral prayers on behalf of the newly married couples. Services of Thanksgiving for same-sex marriage have been hosted by congregations; for example, St. Audoen's Church hosted "a service of thanksgiving" for same-sex marriage. REFORM Ireland, a conservative lobby within the Church of Ireland, has rejected the contents of the letter.

In 2016, some Church of Ireland clergy signed a letter supporting the U.S. Episcopal Church and its open stance towards blessing same-sex couples. In January 2016, the Church of Ireland Gazette, which is "editorially independent of the denomination", endorsed and supported a blessing rite for same-sex marriages in the church. A church report has also said "the moral logic underpinning the negative portrayal of same-sex eroticism in Scripture does not directly address committed, loving, consecrated same-sex relationships today." In 2017, the General Synod considered a motion to request public services of thanksgiving for same-sex relationships; the vote was 176 against the motion, 146 in favour, and 24 abstained. The General Synod also unanimously accepted a report from the church's select committee on human sexuality recommending "that the Bishops further examine the unresolved theological differences as represented in the select committee, with a view to making proposals to facilitate a way forward." Paul Colton, Bishop of Cork, announced his support for the introduction of same-sex marriage in the Church of Ireland.

A 2017 motion at General Synod calling upon "the House of Bishops to investigate a means to develop sensitive, local pastoral arrangements for public prayer and thanksgiving with same-sex couples at these key moments in their lives, and to present their ideas to General Synod 2018, with a view to making proposals at General Synod 2019" was defeated with 176 opposed, 146 in favour, and 24 abstentions. The Church of Ireland therefore is the only Anglican Church in the British Isles to have synodically reaffirmed traditional marriage and rejected proposals to bless same-sex relationships.

In 2018, the Irish bishops released a statement on the continuing conversations surrounding human sexuality. The Bishops stated that the church's teaching remains that marriage is between a man and a woman, but acknowledged that they are divided on the subject themselves. The letter says that clergy cannot perform or bless a same-sex marriage, but that clergy can offer prayers for a couple who have married in a civil ceremony. The liberal wing wanting change noted that "the statement allows for autonomy at a diocesan and parish level, for prayer and pastoral celebration with LGBT+ couples who have married, although this is not by means of solemnization, formal blessing or specifically sanctioned liturgy."

In 2023, three dioceses voted to support the blessing of same-sex couples and asked that General Synod consider a motion to that effect. The United Diocese of Tuam, Limerick, and Killaloe, the Diocese of Dublin and Glendalough, and the Diocese of Cashel, Ferns, and Ossory have voted to ask that General Synod consider a motion to bless same-sex couples following a civil marriage or civil partnership.

=== Church in Wales ===
The Church in Wales currently has clergy and lay members with differing views regarding the subject of human sexuality. However, the trend has been for the church to move in a more liberal direction. The Church in Wales has taken steps towards allowing same-sex marriages and blessing rites for same-sex unions. After the Welsh bishops released a statement declaring it "unjust" to not provide formal provisions for same-sex marriages and civil partnerships, the General Synod voted in favour of requesting such formal rites for same-sex relationships.

In 2011, the Church in Wales allowed priests in civil partnerships to receive full employee benefits. In 2012, Barry Morgan, Archbishop of Wales, endorsed civil marriage for same-sex couples and encouraged other Anglicans to support the legislation. After Morgan offered his support for the civil policy, some bishops and dioceses developed legislation to alter the official position of the Church in Wales. The church has also endorsed an LGBT film meant to encourage support and affirmation for LGBT people.

Since 2005, the Church in Wales has permitted priests to enter into same-sex civil partnerships. "The Church in Wales has no formal view on whether people in civil partnerships who are in a sexual relationship can serve as clergy. If the issue arises, it is up to the relevant Bishop to decide." In 2020, the Church consecrated the province's first openly lesbian bishop in a civil partnership.

In 2015, the governing body voted in favour of same-sex marriages, but a policy change requires further action. During the consultation and discussion, a majority of respondents voted in favour of same-gender marriage. Among the dioceses, the Diocese of St Asaph and the Diocese of Llandaff overwhelmingly supported same-sex marriage. Overall, 52% of the Governing Body voted in favour of allowing same-sex marriages in church. In April 2016, the Bench of Bishops decided to fully affirm same-sex couples and offer prayers of celebration for same-sex marriages. Of the prayers provided for same-sex couples, Form One gives God thanks "for [the two people], who have found such love and companionship in each other, that it has led them to dedicate their lives in support of one another". In September 2021, the Church in Wales voted to "formally bless same-sex couples" instead (by way of debate and compromise) - but still not legally recognising same-sex marriage within titles of the Church officially.

In November 2021, the Bishop of St Asaph Gregory Cameron blessed the civil partnership of Lee Taylor and Fabiano Da Silva Duarte at St Collen's Church in Llangollen. Kieran Bohan coordinator of the Open Table Network said: "It is heartwarming to see a bishop embrace a priest whose civil partnership he has just blessed." In 2025, the Church in Wales elected Cherry Vann as the Archbishop of Wales, making her the first woman to serve as Archbishop in the United Kingdom and the first openly LGBTQ and partnered bishop to be a Primate within the Anglican Communion.

=== Scottish Episcopal Church ===
The Scottish Episcopal Church (SEC) does not have a policy against ordaining non-celibate gay clergy, thus such ordinations are theoretically allowed. They announced this on 23 March 2005: "[We] had never regarded the fact that someone was in a close relationship with a member of the same sex as in itself constituting a bar to the exercise of an ordained ministry".

Headlines in North America announced that the Scottish Episcopal Church had agreed to ordain gay and lesbian people in committed relationships. The Church thus released a statement pointing out that the policy was not news. Regarding the media release, the Church said:

In referring to the fact that there is no current bar to ordination for someone who might be in a close relationship with a member of the same sex, the Bishops were simply stating the present position as it applies in Scotland where, unlike some other provinces, no motion discouraging such ordinations has ever been passed by our General Synod. Consequently, the statement earlier this month does not represent any change in policy on the part of the Bishops.

In 2005, clergy were able to enter into same-sex civil partnerships, and sexual abstinence is not a requirement in the Scottish Episcopal Church for such civil unions. Since 2008, St. Mary Cathedral in Glasgow has offered blessings for civil partnerships.

In 2015, the Scottish Episcopal Church voted in favour of same-sex marriage ceremonies. Following that vote, Dundee Cathedral hosted its first same-sex blessing service. In 2016, the General Synod voted in favour of amending the marriage canon to include same gender couples; the change required a second reading in 2017. The motion was approved by 97 votes to 33 with 3 abstentions.

After the Synod, David Chillingworth, Primus of the Scottish Episcopal Church, gave his assessment of the situation regarding the change in the marriage canon. In 2017, the General Synod approved the amendment to the marriage canon to include same-sex couples in the second reading.

=== Church of South India ===
The Church of South India, although divided in opinion like many Anglican provinces, has many outspoken clergy in favour of rights for same-sex couples. "The Church of South India (CSI) [is] a relatively liberal Protestant church which has, since 1984, allowed women to become pastors. 'CSI has been liberal on these issues. It has taken up issues of gender, dalits and landlessness. It has to address the issue of sexual minorities too'." Since 2012, some dioceses have confirmed that transgender persons may be ordained priests.

In 2008, CSI supported the faction of the Anglican Church—Global Fellowship of Confessing Anglicans (GAFCON)—on the debate over allowing gay clergy. Indian bishops sided with traditionalists on the issue of homosexuality. The church does not ordain clergy who are active in same-sex relationships. In 2009, the National Council of Churches in India, of which the CSI is a member, supported the legalization of consensual same-sex relationships in India. Christopher Rajkumar, a presbyter in the Church of South India, stated that opposition to the rights of same-sex couples is a violation of human rights. Also in 2009, V. Devasahayam, Bishop in Madras, supported legal rights for gay people saying "it is wrong to condemn people for their sexual orientation". Devashayam also argued that sexual orientation is genetic and that Scripture should be re-read from a contemporary context.

In 2015, St Mark's Cathedral in Bangalore, a congregation of the CSI, hosted a forum on preventing homophobia, and Vincent Rajkumar, a presbyter, advocated for the support of gay rights. CSI clergy, under the National Council of Churches in India, co-held a conference working against homophobia in Jakarta, Indonesia in 2014 featuring a rainbow flag and with speakers in favour of same-sex couples. Moreover, during the week of the Primates' meeting in Canterbury, the CSI was listed by the BBC as being among the Anglican provinces open to blessing same-sex couples.

In 2016, a seminary affiliated with the CSI has begun offering a seminary on LGBT issues. "The Tamil Nadu Theological Seminary in Madurai held a two-hour seminar on gender and sexuality..." In 2023, the Communion of Churches in India, of which the CSI is a part, opposed the legalization of same-sex marriages in India.

=== Church of Ceylon ===
The Church of Ceylon is the Anglican Church in Sri Lanka. It is an extraprovincial jurisdiction of the Archbishop of Canterbury, who serves as its Metropolitan.

In Sri Lanka, homosexuality is illegal by the constitution of the 1970s.

Keerthisiri Fernando, Bishop of the Diocese of Kurunegala, Church of Ceylon, said:

Sociologically we need to understand that differing human sexuality is a reality. While a small proportion may belong to one polar and another proportion to another side all the others remain at differing proportions on the scale of human sexuality. How can we then to promote "diversity in unity" rather than "unity in diversity"? We cannot expect or force everyone to belong to one category... People are born with a variety of sexual orientations. We can attribute this genetically, medically, ethically, secularly or in any other manner. But it remains a reality. We must now think how to accommodate them in the Church and in the human family. How can we make them feel wanted, welcomed, respected and indeed honoured.

=== Church of the Province of South East Asia ===
(Cambodia, Indonesia, Laos, Malaysia, Nepal, Singapore, Thailand, Vietnam)

The Province of South East Asia criticised the confirmation of Gene Robinson as a bishop by the Episcopal Church (USA), stating:

The said confirmation therefore seriously raises the question of ECUSA's genuine commitment to our corporate responsibility as members of the church catholic to uphold and promote only the Apostolic Faith and Order inherited. A natural, holistic and consistent reading of the Scriptures clearly show that it is against the practise of homosexuality. In the context of orthodox and classical Christianity, the canonical authority of the Scriptures is taken to be recognized and received by the community of faith and not subject to majority, culturally relevant or even theological voting.

On 24 November 2003, the province declared that it had entered into a state of impaired communion with the Episcopal Church, rejecting the consecration of Dr Robinson.

=== Hong Kong Sheng Kung Hui (Hong Kong Anglican Church) ===
The fourth General Synod of the Hong Kong Sheng Kung Hui, at its meeting on 15 October 2007, resolved that the Anglican Church in Hong Kong and Macau supports the recommendations contained in the Windsor Report so as to safeguard the unity of the Anglican Communion. However, Peter Kwong, a former primate, stated that he supported diversity in the Communion saying "Anglicanism is inclusive ... so why shouldn't we find a common ground on homosexuality?". In 2013, some leaders in the Hong Kong Anglican Church endorsed civil rights legislation that provided legal protection for the LGBT community from discrimination. Additionally, in 2015, Peter Douglas Koon, the Anglican province's secretary general, objected to discrimination occurring in conservative schools and emphatically assured the LGBT community that Anglican schools would be accepting of LGBT faculty and students. The Hong Kong Anglican Church has maintained partnership and communion with The Episcopal Church.

=== Anglican Church in Aotearoa, New Zealand and Polynesia ===
There is no officially stated policy regarding homosexuality. Members are also divided regarding agreement with the Windsor Report and Lambeth Conference. There is no single national approach towards the ordination of openly gay or lesbian clergy, although individual dioceses have supported or opposed the inclusion of LGBT clergy. However, in 2016, it has been announced that the church will go forward in provincially proposing the option of same-gender blessing rites. In 2018, the Synod voted in favour of allowing blessing rites for same-sex marriages and civil unions. Prior to official blessings, the church said that "clergy should be permitted 'to recognise in public worship' a same-gender civil union or state marriage of members of their faith community."

Some Pākehā parishes are more open to gay and lesbian issues, including ordination and blessing of unions. The Dunedin and Auckland dioceses are notable for other such examples, including the ordination of a non-celibate gay clergy and the blessings of same-sex relationships performed by priests in an official capacity. In the Dunedin Diocese, "Blessings of same-sex relationships are offered in line with Diocesan Policy and with the bishop's permission." In 2006, an openly gay and partnered deacon was ordained in the Dunedin Diocese. Subsequently, the same deacon was ordained as a priest. The Diocese of Auckland has also established policies in favour of ordaining partnered gay and lesbian priests. One priest, in a same-sex relationship, is an assistant priest in Auckland after being denied a licence in the Waikato Diocese. Congregations may offer a 'relationship blessing' for two partners in the Auckland Diocese. In 2005, a same-sex couple was joined in a civil union at St. Matthew in the City in the Auckland Diocese. In 2011, the Waiapu Diocese adopted a resolution affirming the ordination of gay and lesbian clergy and asking for an authorised liturgy for blessing same-sex relationships. The Bishop's chaplain in the Waiapu Diocese has also performed a blessing for a same-sex couple. In 2017, Andrew Hedge, Bishop of Waiapu, installed an openly gay priest, who is married to his partner, as the Dean of Waiapu Cathedral.

New Zealand writer Liz Lightfoot has documented the experiences of individuals coming out in the Anglican Church as a contribution to the 'listening process' in the Anglican Church.

In 2014, General Synod passes a resolution that would create a pathway towards the blessing of same-sex relationships, while upholding the traditional doctrine of marriage. The synod in 2016 voted to receive the report on blessings but left the proposal to "[lie] on the table" and the report will be reviewed again in 2018. "However, Synod did pass a constitutional change allowing bishops the right to authorize a service for use in his or her diocese." In 2018, General Synod/Te Hinota voted in favour of the process to approve Motion 29 and the blessing of same-sex relationships.

=== Anglican Church of Australia ===
In the Seventeenth Session of the General Synod of the Anglican Church of Australia in 2017, the synod passed a motion recognising "that the doctrine of our church, in line with traditional Christian teaching, is that marriage is an exclusive and lifelong union of a man and a woman, and further, recognises that this has been the subject of several General Synod resolutions over the past fifteen years". In 2018, Philip Freier, Primate of Australia and Archbishop of Melbourne, released an ad clerum reiterating the current position that clergy cannot perform a same-sex marriage. In 2020, the Appellate Tribunal, the highest church court, ruled that a diocese may authorise blessing rites for same-sex unions. At the same time, the church has "no official stance on homosexuality" itself.

At its 2004 general synod held in Perth, the church passed four resolutions on human sexuality. The key resolutions stated that, "Recognising that this is a matter of ongoing debate and conversation in this church and that we all have an obligation to listen to each other with respect, this General Synod does not condone the liturgical blessing of same sex relationships" and "this General Synod does not condone the ordination of people in open committed same sex relationships." Nevertheless, the Diocese of Perth has "a number of people in same-sex relationships amongst the clergy". Phillip Aspinall, a former Primate, has stated that the topic is not worth splitting the church over. Aspinall has also stated that he does not take an official position on the ordination of gay clergy, preferring instead to encourage respectful conversation. Another former primate, Peter Carnley, stated that he believed "life-long gay relationships and commitments ... could receive church blessings." Roger Herft, as diocesan Bishop of Newcastle, "support[ed] blessing gay unions". Peter Jensen, the former archbishop of the strongly conservative Evangelical Diocese of Sydney, has vigorously opposed homosexuality, stating that accepting non-heterosexual people would be "calling holy what God called sin". St. Andrew's Church in Subiaco, Perth, Western Australia, was the first Anglican church in Australia to publicly welcome gay, lesbian, bisexual and transgender people. Its Sunday evening services are affirming of LGBT people. Since then, other dioceses have taken affirming stances towards same-sex couples and LGBT clergy. In 2013, the Diocese of Perth voted in favour of recognising same-sex unions. While Roger Herft, Archbishop of Perth vetoed the measure, he did say that "there are gay and lesbian clergy serving in the priesthood. They are licensed by me and are honoured and respected as priests ..." The Diocese of Perth did vote to no longer prohibit clergy in relationships, including sexual relationships, outside of marriage. In 2011, the Diocese of Adelaide elected a new assistant bishop, Tim Harris, and he supported allowing LGBT clergy if they agreed to be celibate, but, at the same time, he expressed that he is open to conversation about change. Moreover, in 2012, the Diocese of Gippsland appointed an openly gay priest, and, in 2015, John Parkes, Bishop of Wangaratta, endorsed same-sex marriage joining an archdeacon who had already offered to perform gay marriages when allowed to do so. Additionally, Sarah Macneil, Bishop of Grafton, has been affirming and supportive of LGBT clergy and relationships. So far, two cathedrals, the cathedral of the Diocese of Grafton and St. John's Cathedral in the Diocese of Brisbane have officially become supportive and affirming of LGBT people. Towards the end of 2015, Greg Thompson, Bishop of Newcastle, called for conversation and has said that he opposes discrimination against LGBT people. Also in 2015, the Social Responsibilities Committee of the Anglican Church in Southern Queensland endorsed civil unions for same-sex couples.

In 2015, Kay Goldsworthy, Bishop of Gippsland, appointed an openly gay and partnered priest to another post. Also, in 2016, Garry Weatherill, Bishop of Ballarat, announced his support for same-sex marriage, though his statements were unclear if this was a matter of law or church doctrine. In April 2016, St Andrew's Church in the Diocese of Perth publicly blessed a same-sex union. In 2018, Archdeacon Peter MacLeod-Miller "conducted an unofficial hand-clasping ceremony" for a same-sex couple. The Wangaratta and Ballarat dioceses have voted to bless same-sex civil unions. The dean of St John's Cathedral in Brisbane, the Very Revd Peter Catt, wrote that he had been blessing same-sex unions. The Dioceses of Wangaratta and Newcastle have approved of blessing rites for same-sex marriages.

=== Anglican Province of the Southern Cone of America ===
Gregory Venables, Presiding Bishop of the Anglican Church of South America, has also been strongly critical of homosexuality. Bishops in his province criticised the Windsor Report for failing to call liberal churches to repentance. The province has declared itself in "impaired communion" with ECUSA, but continues to maintain full communion with opponents of the Robinson consecration. Venables has authorised dioceses within his province to provide episcopal oversight to United States churches that have left ECUSA.

In December 2007, the convention of the Episcopal Diocese of San Joaquin, an Episcopal Church diocese in central California, voted to leave the ECUSA and joined the Province of the Southern Cone as the Anglican Diocese of San Joaquin. A minority of the Episcopal Diocese remained in the ECUSA. In October 2008, a majority of the convention of the Episcopal Diocese of Pittsburgh voted to leave ECUSA and affiliate with the Southern Cone, resulting in one body affiliated with the Southern Cone and a second body remaining within ECUSA. The following month, the conventions of two more U.S. dioceses—the Anglican Diocese of Quincy in Illinois and the Episcopal Diocese of Fort Worth in Texas—voted to leave ECUSA and affiliate with the Southern Cone. All were subsequently absorbed into the new Anglican Church in North America.

However, some Anglican representatives from the Diocese of Uruguay expressed their support for the inclusion of same-sex couples.

=== Episcopal Anglican Church of Brazil ===
The Anglican Episcopal Church of Brazil is characterised by its progressive theological views on homosexuality. After the 1998 Lambeth Conference, the Anglican Church in Brazil decided to promote two national forums on human sexuality, both held in Rio de Janeiro. Its decisions guided the policy. According to the final document, the consensus of the Brazilian Church is that human sexuality is a gift from God, and it should be experienced in peace, freedom, love and respect. The Church has approved of the ordination of openly gay priests and has offered blessing services for same-sex marriages. It is understood that the Church should respect the privacy of its members and clergy. Any kind of public exposure of someone's sexual orientation (as a pre-requisite to be a member or take part of any ministry) violates this privacy. Because of that progressive position, the Bishop of the Diocese of Recife, still strongly Evangelical, Robinson Cavalcanti, declared Recife to be independent of the Church of Brazil, an action that resulted in his being deposed as a bishop by the Ecclesiastical Tribunal. Among his main reasons, he pointed out that the Brazilian Church was sympathetic to the ordination of Gene Robinson, as well as the ordination of all LGBTQ people. This split the Diocese of Recife in two: one part loyal to Orlando Santos de Oliveira, Primate of the Anglican Episcopal Church of Brazil at the time, and currently coordinated by Bishop João Peixoto; and the other, under Cavalcanti's leadership, tied to the Anglican Church of the Southern Cone.

In 2016, the Presiding Bishop convened an Extraordinary Synod to discuss adding same-sex marriage to the marriage canon; the proposal was not approved, but it was considered during General Synod in 2017. On 1 June 2018, the General Synod voted to change the marriage canon to include same-sex couples.

=== Anglican Church of Canada ===
Sexual orientation and the Anglican Church of Canada exist within a strictly Canadian context. In the secular context, Canadian law underwent a profound change in regards to homosexuality. The last same-sex attracted person to be sent to prison indefinitely as a "dangerous sex offender" was in 1967. In 1969, the Canadian parliament passed amendments of the Criminal Code, decriminalising homosexuality in Canada. On 20 July 1971, the last gay man criminally convicted because of his sexual orientation was released from prison. A series of judicial rulings beginning in 2003 legalised same-sex marriage in the majority of Canada's provinces, and on 20 July 2005, the Canadian government extended the new definition nationwide by statute.

In 2013, ten Anglican dioceses (Edmonton, Nova Scotia and Prince Edward Island, Rupert's Land, Ottawa, Vancouver-based New Westminster, Toronto, London-based Huron, Hamilton-based Niagara, Montreal, and Victoria-based British Columbia) allow the blessing and marriage of same-sex couples. The Anglican Parishes of the Central Interior (formerly the Diocese of Cariboo) also permit such marriage rites.

On 30 September 2012, David Irving, Bishop of Saskatoon, ordained as deacon a person civilly married to a person of the same sex.

At the General Synod on 6 July 2013, the Anglican Church of Canada made the decision to vote on the issue of same-sex marriage at the following synod in 2016. At the General Synod in 2016, a motion to change the marriage canon to include same-sex marriage received the necessary 2/3 majority and was approved; it received a second reading in 2019 and failed to receive a 2/3 majority in the Order of Bishops, though it did receive a 2/3 majority in the Orders of Clergy and Laity. Following the General Synod in 2016, the Dioceses of Niagara and Ottawa decided to allow legal same-sex marriages as a local option. Also in 2016, the Diocese of Toronto elected with Kevin Robertson, for the first time, an openly gay and partnered person to be a bishop. Although the amendment to the marriage canon failed to receive the 2/3 majority needed among the Order of Bishops, the General Synod did pass a resolution allowing each provincial synod and diocese to bless or perform same-sex marriages if they choose to do so.

The general assembly held the second reading of the motion to approve same-sex marriage on 12 July 2019. In spite of support by the laity and clergy, the motion did not pass because it was not supported by a full two-thirds of bishops. Director of Communications Meghan Kilty said that many dioceses have been performing same-sex marriages, such as that of now-bishop Kevin Robertson in 2018 at St. James Cathedral. Kilty added that many diocese would continue to perform such services since the Church had not specifically prohibited the practice. As of August 2019, 19 out of 30 dioceses had approved of same-sex marriages being performed in church.

=== Episcopal Church in the United States of America ===
In 2003, ECUSA became the first Anglican province to ordain an openly gay priest in a same-sex relationship as a bishop; however, the Episcopal Church's stance on LGBTQ matters had been debated for decades. In 1976, the Church's General Convention passed a resolution stating: "It is the sense of this General Convention that homosexual persons are children of God who have a full and equal claim with all other persons upon the love acceptance, and pastoral concern and care of the Church." In 1977, the first openly gay and lesbian priest was ordained by Paul Moore Jr., Bishop of New York.

Various interpretations were held within the Episcopal Church on this resolution, ranging from the majority of dioceses that now ordain non-celibate gay, lesbian, bisexual, and transgender clergy to the minority group who founded the Anglican Communion Network which currently opposes such ordinations. On 23 June 2005, the Episcopal Church defined its meaning in a 130-page document entitled "To Set Our Hope on Christ":

We believe that God has been opening our eyes to acts of God that we had not known how to see before ... the eligibility for ordination of those in covenanted same-sex unions ... a person living in a same-gendered union may be eligible to lead the flock of Christ ... members of the Episcopal Church have discerned holiness in same-sex relationships and have come to support the blessing of such unions and the ordination or consecration of persons in those unions ... Their holiness stands in stark contrast with many sinful patterns of sexuality in the world ... The idea that there is only one correct way to read or interpret scripture is a rather modern idea.

In July 2009, the General Convention voted to allow bishops to bless same-sex unions, and also called for bishops to "collect and develop theological and liturgical resources" for possibly creating an official rite for such ceremonies at the 2012 General Convention.

In January 2010, the Reverend Mally Lloyd and the Reverend Katherine Hancock Ragsdale, two prominent Episcopal priests, married in a ceremony at the Cathedral Church of St. Paul in Boston, Massachusetts.

In 2012, the General Convention approved an official liturgy for blessing same-sex unions, called "The Witnessing and Blessing of a Lifelong Covenant", while making it clear that it was not marriage. The action enabled priests to bestow the church's blessing on gay couples even in states where same-sex marriage is illegal, subject to the approval of the bishops.

In 2015, the General Convention approved "canonical and liturgical changes to provide marriage equality for Episcopalians". The canonical change eliminated "language defining marriage as between a man and a woman". The liturgical change provided two marriage rites for use by same-sex or opposite-sex couples with consent of the priest and permission of the bishop.

=== Episcopal Church of Cuba ===
At least one bishop of the extraprovincial diocese, Nerva Cot Aguilera, stated that she supported the ordination of openly gay and lesbian priests. The Episcopal Church of Cuba is now a Diocese of The Episcopal Church, based in the US.

=== Church in the Province of the West Indies ===
The church defines marriage as a union of one man with one woman and does not bless same-sex unions while supporting the legalization of homosexuality. Archbishop Gomez has said Gene Robinson's ordination is incompatible with Scripture. In 2017, John Holder, Archbishop of the West Indies, stated that there is no biblical support for anti-sodomy laws and urged Jamaica to repeal its laws against gay and lesbian relationships. In 2019, the province elected Howard Gregory, Bishop of Jamaica, as archbishop; Gregory supports the decriminalization same-gender sexual relationships and supports the legalization of homosexuality.

=== Church of the Province of Central Africa ===
Archbishop Malango was quoted as stating Gene Robinson's election "brought darkness, disappointment, sadness and grief" to his Church.

=== Anglican Church of Kenya ===
Archbishop Nzimbi has strongly spoken against admitting non-celibate same-sex attracted people into the Church.

In 2013, Eliud Wabukala, then the Primate of the church, "denounced a decision by the Church of England's House of Bishops to allow gay priests to become bishops". He also opposed priests being allowed to enter into same-sex civil partnerships saying the Church of England "'seems to be advancing along the same path' as the US Episcopal Church and the Anglican Church of Canada which he accused of promoting 'a false gospel'".

In 2016, the church was ordered to reinstate three priests who had been suspended in 2015 after allegations surfaced that they were gay. All three of these priests returned to their pastoral duties in June 2018. It was also agree in November 2018 that the three priests would settle a lawsuit they had filed against Joseph Kagûnda, Bishop of Mount Kenya West, through mediation. In December 2018, it was announced that the Church had given the three priests 6.8 million shillings each as compensation.

=== Anglican Church of Korea ===
The Anglican Church of Korea is among the more liberal provinces in the Anglican Communion. In 2015, a cleric, members, and congregations of the province participated in an LGBT Pride event and have been affirming of equal rights for gays and lesbians. The Anglican Church in Korea has openly had discussions about human sexuality.

=== Church of Nigeria ===
The Church remains sharply opposed to homosexuality, calling it "a perversion of human dignity". In 2005, Peter Akinola, then Primate of All Nigeria, spoke out against the Church of England's decision to allow priests to enter into same-sex civil partnerships. The Church of Nigeria amended its constitution to remove reference to Canterbury as the 'mother' church of the Anglican Communion, and replaced that reference with a statement of being in communion with Anglican churches professing "historic faith".

In March 2009, the Church declared itself in full communion with the Anglican Church in North America, a denomination formed by American and Canadian Anglicans who opposed their national churches' actions with regard to homosexuality and equality.

In 2013, Nicholas Okoh, Primate of All Nigeria, opposed the Church of England's decision to allow gay bishops, even if celibate, to enter into civil unions.

In March 2021, the Archbishop of Canterbury, Justin Welby, said that Ndukuba's call for "the virus" of homosexuality to be "expunged" was "...unacceptable. It dehumanises those human beings of whom the statement speak".

=== Anglican Church in Central America ===
The Anglican Church in Central America consists of five churches representing different Central American countries. Each member church makes many of its own decisions. In 2013, priests and ministries in the Diocese of El Salvador began to advocate for the full inclusion of LGBT members. In 2014, the Episcopal Church of Costa Rica, a diocese of the province, took steps towards welcoming the LGBTQ community. The Diocese of Guatemala elected Silvestre Enrique Romero as bishop coadjutor in 2017. Prior to being elected bishop, Romero served in The Episcopal Church (US), and offered to bless same-sex unions as priest-in-charge.

=== Anglican Church of Mexico ===
In its general synod 2010 by initiative of its own primate Carlos Touché-Porter, synod delegates overwhelmingly approved stringent prohibition against blessings of same-gender couples.

The Anglican Church of Mexico only recognizes heterosexual marriage as the standard for canonical marriage in the church. Upon the approval of gay civil marriage in Mexico, then Primate Francisco Moreno expressed that the official stance of the Anglican Church of Mexico will continue in spite of secular legislation. However, the Anglican Church of Mexico, like the other North American provinces, has expressed in some particular instances more liberal views regarding gender and sexuality. Still, Francisco Moreno, Archbishop of Mexico, has opposed same-sex unions and the current canons do not provide for them. In 2007, Carlos Touché Porter, then-Presiding Bishop, became a patron of Inclusive Church (a charity based in England) advocating for "'a liberal, open church which is inclusive of all,' regardless of race, gender or sexuality". Touché Porter also affirmed that Gene Robinson was not the first gay cleric, but that he was simply being honest. He also supported the ordination of openly gay clergy, and his diocese, the Diocese of Mexico, unofficially "permits clergy in same-sex relationships to serve in the ministry". Furthermore, in 2008, when Pope Benedict XVI approached the Anglican Church with the possibility of joining the Catholic Church over issues of sexuality, Touché Porter, then-Presiding Bishop, reassured the Mexican province that he supported remaining within the Anglican Communion. Yet in 2010 Carlos Touché-Porter backtracked and promoted a stringent prohibition of any blessing of same-gender couples which was approved by the nation synod by a significant majority of delegates.

Also in 2008, Sergio Carranza, retired Bishop of (Central) Mexico, expressed support for the ordination of gay clergy. Among the affirming churches, St. Mark's Anglican Church in Guadalajara, Jalisco is publicly supportive of gay, lesbian, and transgender members. Nevertheless, on the other side, Francisco Moreno, then-Presiding Bishop, has indicated that he supports marriage as defined "between a man and a woman".

In 2015, at least one congregation "opened its doors" to bless same-gender couples. The church has discussed same-gender unions at its General Synod. In 2019, Ricardo Gomez Osnaya, Bishop of Western Mexico, licensed an openly gay and married priest to serve within the diocese. In 2021, Julio César Martín-Trejo and the Diocese of the Southeast officially participated in and supported LGBT Pride, calling for the legalization of civil same-sex marriage. Also in 2021, Martin proposed a draft version of a policy allowing the blessing of same-gender unions, and the proposed policy is not yet official and is under discussion and review.

As to gay marriage, the newest bishop in the Province has openly spoken in support of civil and ecclesiastical same-gender marriage, Canadian-educated Julio César Martín-Trejo Bishop of the Southeast.

Although unofficially, in the diocese of Mexico bishops have allowed clergy to be in informal non-recognized same-sex relationships, while in the Diocese of Western Mexico a retired gay priest officially in a secular civil marriage has been allowed to teach at its seminary.

In 2016, the General Synod of the church published a pronouncement declaring itself to be against all forms of violence and discrimination against migrants, victims of violence, or the LGBTI community.

On 19 December 2020, three diocesan Bishops released a statement explaining that they are discussing issues related to the LGBT community and church teaching, and are working towards a common understanding.

In 2021 for the first time ever a Mexican Anglican Diocese participated in a Gay Pride Parade; on 19 June 2021, under the leadership of its bishop, Julio César Martín-Trejo the Diocese of the Southeast joined demands for equal civil marriage and gay rights in the city of Xalapa, Veracruz. Later, Martin expressly called on secular authorities to respect the Federal Supreme Court's decision and legalise gay civil marriage.

=== Anglican Church of Southern Africa ===
The canon law of the Anglican Church of Southern Africa states that "marriage by divine institution is a lifelong and exclusive union partnership between one man and one woman" and makes no provision for same-sex weddings or for blessing same-sex civil unions. The Diocese of Saldanha Bay has approved the blessing of same-sex civil unions as a provision on the diocesan level. At the same time, the church does not have an official stance on homosexuality itself. However, it has been reported of Thabo Makgoba, Archbishop of Cape Town, that "The Anglican Primate, [is] one among few church leaders in Africa to support same-sex marriage." Makgoba and his working group on human sexuality have proposed a motion "… to amend Canon 34 which will enable ministry to those in Same Sex Unions and the LGBTI Community in the context in which ACSA operates in Southern Africa". In 2023, the Synod of Bishops agreed to develop "prayers of affirmation and acknowledgement for all faithful Anglicans who are in civil unions."

A previous archbishop, Desmond Tutu, said that: "The Jesus I worship is not likely to collaborate with those who vilify and persecute an already oppressed minority [...]. I could not myself keep quiet whilst people were being penalised for something about which they could do nothing, their sexuality. For it is so improbable that any sane, normal person would deliberately choose a lifestyle exposing him or her to so much vilification, opprobrium and physical abuse, even death. To discriminate against our sisters and brothers who are lesbian or gay on grounds of their sexual orientation for me is as totally unacceptable and unjust as Apartheid ever was."

Another former archbishop, Njongonkulu Ndungane, has criticised other African churches regarding homosexuality and said that the church's attention should be focused on other concerns such as AIDS and poverty. Nevertheless, Ndungane expressed publicly his disapproval of same-sex marriage when it was legalised in South Africa: "As far as we are concerned as a church, our understanding of marriage is between a man and a woman. And as a church, and the Anglican Church in particular, we have said no to same-sex unions." However, in 2016, the bishops of the Anglican Church of Southern Africa voted to affirm members in same-gender marriages as fully equal members of the Church. Raphael Hess, Bishop of Saldanha Bay, has backed same-sex marriage and is proposing a way to allow gay priests to marry. Tutu also gave his daughter and her partner a blessing.

Additionally, the Anglican Church of Southern Africa does not have an official policy regarding the ordination of openly gay or lesbian clergy and, thus, some may identify as LGBT depending on their diocese. In 2003, for example, Rowan Smith, Dean of St. George's Cathedral in Cape Town, was warmly celebrated by his congregation after coming out as gay. Douglas Torr, another priest, also came out to his congregation in Johannesburg. Moreover, Mervyn Castle, who is openly gay and celibate, was consecrated suffragan bishop in Cape Town. Still, while gay and lesbian clergy may be locally ordained, the national church has not yet developed liturgies to bless same-gender unions.

Nevertheless, the Diocese of Cape Town, in 2009, did vote in favour of recognising same-gender unions pastorally and the diocese committed itself to studying the issue further. The vote in 2009 "[had] taken a small step towards accepting gay people in 'faithful, committed relationships.'" The resolution also said that it is "Affirming a pastoral response to same-sex partnerships of faithful commitment in our parish families;" Also in 2009, Makgoba said that "[g]ays and lesbians can be leaders within the Anglican Church of Southern Africa as long as they remain celibate, its synod of bishops has declared."

In 2013, the Provincial Synod adopted a resolution that "urged its bishops to provide guidelines for giving pastoral care to same-sex couples who have entered civil unions under South African law". The resolution also:

1. Affirms:
  1. That God calls us to love and minister to all people, regardless of their sexual orientation, while at the same time upholding God's standards of holiness;
  2. That this is a highly complex and emotive area which affects many people deeply and has a far reaching impact on the mission of the Church.

In 2016, Raphael Hess, Bishop of Sadanha Bay, gave permission for an Anglican priest to officiate at a service of celebration for Mpho Tutu and her partner. When Tutu surrendered her licence to avoid controversy, Hess stated that he "hoped it would be short-lived" and that he is proposing to change policy to welcome her back. Her father, Desmond Tutu, gave "a father's blessing".

Currently, priests may not enter into a same-sex marriage, but the church does allow "same-sex relationships if they are celibate". Also in 2016, Makgoba said "we also tried at the Synod of Bishops to draw up guidelines for clergy wanting to bless couples in same-sex unions, or who want to enter same-sex unions themselves ... On this issue, I had to report back to the Synod, the only agreement we reached is that we were not of one mind". Yet, the bishops did agree that LGBT people, including members in same-sex marriages, are affirmed as "full members" of the church.

The Diocese of Saldanha Bay proposed the blessing of same-gender unions and the licensing of LGBTI priests in civil marriages. During the provincial synod, the proposal did not receive enough votes and was not passed. Makgoba, however, declared that "all is not lost". He said the issue might hopefully be taken up again at the next provincial synod in 2019. He also said the issue could be discussed at the local level in parishes and dioceses. Makgoba further noted how relatively liberal the province is saying "As it was, the degree of support for the motion was quite substantial if you compare us to other African provinces of the Anglican Church, most of which are vigorously opposed to same-sex unions in any form." He also voiced his support for same-sex marriage.

The Diocese of False Bay has also been supportive of LGBTI clergy and members having celebrated the ministry of one of its openly gay priests. The Diocese of Pretoria joined the list of dioceses that support same-sex marriage in the Anglican Church. At least one priest, who is in a same-sex relationship with his partner, has spoken to the press acknowledging that the church ordained him knowing of his relationship.

In a pastoral letter published on 2 March 2017, the Bench of Bishops said that they continue to discuss "the Pastoral Guidelines for ministry to those in same-sex relationships, which are still incomplete. We asked Archbishop Thabo to set up a small group of Bishops to work on completing them, together with others who could help the process." Makgoba is proposing a change to the canons following that process. In 2019, the Provincial Synod approved a motion to establish a permanent commission on human sexuality and to refer a report to dioceses that recommends allowing each diocese to choose to offer prayers for a couple following a same-sex civil union; on a third motion to request the Bishops provide guidelines for ministry to LGBTQI people, the synod was deadlocked, and did not pass, in a tied vote of 75 in favour to 75 against. In 2023, the Archbishop's Commission on Human Sexuality proposed allowing clergy to bless same-sex civil unions; the Synod of Bishops rejected the proposal for blessings but did agree to allow prayers to be said to affirm and acknowledge same-sex couples in civil unions.

On 25 April 2024 the church published draft prayers to be said with same-sex couples, asking members of the church to study the draft prayers. The drafted prayers include both blessings for same-sex couples and prayers acknowledging disagreement with same-sex relationships. The Provincial Synod did not approve the draft prayers for official use. Following the 2024 Synod, Raphael Hess, the bishop of the Diocese of Saldanha Bay, gave permission to clergy in the diocese to bless same-sex couples.

=== Episcopal Church of the Sudan ===
The Primate of the Episcopal Church of the Sudan, Archbishop Daniel Deng Bul, on 22 July at a public press conference during the 2008 Lambeth Conference called for Bishop Gene Robinson to resign, and for all those who had participated in his consecration to confess their sins to the conference.

=== Anglican Church of Tanzania ===
In November 2003, responding to the consecration of Bishop Gene Robinson, Archbishop Donald Mtetemela stated his belief that homosexuality is against biblical teaching: "The Anglican Church of Tanzania believes that homosexuality is contrary to the teaching of the Word of God. It is a sin." Mtetemela declared that the Church of Tanzania was no longer in communion with Episcopal Church bishops who participated in the consecration of Robinson, and those who permit the blessing of same-sex unions.

=== Church of Uganda ===
The Ugandan church cut ties with its North American counterparts over homosexuality. It declared itself in full communion with the Anglican Church in North America, a denomination not recognised by the Anglican Communion that was formed by lay and clergy members who had left The Episcopal Church and the Anglican Church of Canada over matters of LGBTQ inclusion.

In 2005, Henry Luke Orombi, then Archbishop of Uganda, criticised the Church of England for permitting priests to enter into same-sex civil partnerships. In 2013, Stanley Ntagali, Archbishop of Uganda, maintained opposition to clergy in civil unions opposing the Church of England's decision to allow bishops to register a civil partnership. Ntagali stated that "to allow clergy in civil partnerships to be eligible to become Bishops is really no different from allowing gay Bishops. This decision violates our Biblical faith and agreements within the Anglican Communion." Ntagali compared England's decision to those made in other western Anglican provinces. "Sadly we must also declare that if the Church of England continues in this contrary direction we must further separate ourselves from it and we are prepared to take the same actions as those prompted by the decisions of The Episcopal Church (USA) and the Anglican Church of Canada ten years ago."

=== Church of Melanesia ===
In 1998, the Council of Bishops requested that Terry Brown, Bishop of Malaita, "draft a study paper on homosexuality for the Church of Melanesia ...". In 2007, Brown reflected on his experience "as an 'out' gay man serving as bishop".

=== Spanish Reformed Episcopal Church ===
On 22 March 2017, the Synod of the Spanish Reformed Episcopal Church released a statement of support expressing its solidarity with the Spanish Evangelical Church after the latter had accepted same-sex relationships. In supporting the Spanish Evangelical Church, the Episcopal Synod joined LGBT advocacy groups by protesting its removal from the Evangelical Council of Madrid. GAFCON, a conservative association of Anglican churches, formed a rival alternative church structure in Spain in opposition to the Spanish Reformed Episcopal Church.

=== Episcopal Church of South Sudan ===
As of 2023, South Sudan's Episcopal Church is strongly opposed to homosexuality. Reverend Justin Badi Arama is the Primate of the Episcopal Church of South Sudan. He also has the role of Chairman of the Global South Fellowship of Anglican Churches, a conservative group of Anglican provinces. Badi has affirmed that "marriage is between man and a woman", and has urged the Anglican communion to impose sanctions on provinces that allow same sex marriages to be conducted.

=== Lusitanian Catholic Apostolic Evangelical Church ===
In 2020, the Bishop of the Lusitanian Catholic Apostolic Evangelical Church in Portugal, Jorge Pina Cabral, re-affirmed that the church recognized the Archbishop of Canterbury as the "first among equals" among the bishops of the Anglican Communion and that he supports allowing a diversity of views within the Anglican Communion on human sexuality, saying he favors reconciliation among the member churches of the Communion.

== See also ==
- Anglican realignment
- Anglicanism
- Blessing of same-sex unions in Christian churches
- Cambridge Accord
- Christianity and sexual orientation
- Continuing Anglican movement
- Federation of Anglican Churches in the Americas
- Fellowship of Confessing Anglicans
- Gay bishops
- GAFCON
- History of Christianity and homosexuality
- Homosexuality and Christianity
- Horace Griffin
- Integrity USA
- John Atherton
- Lesbian and Gay Christian Movement
- LGBT clergy in Christianity
- Open Evangelical
- Religion and homosexuality

== Bibliography ==
- Brittain, Christopher Craig and Andrew McKinnon, "Homosexuality and the Construction of 'Anglican Orthodoxy': The Symbolic Politics of the Anglican Communion", Sociology of Religion, vol.72, no.3, pp. 351–373 (2011).
- Hassett, Miranda, Anglican Communion in Crisis: How Episcopal Dissidents and Their African Allies Are Reshaping Anglicanism, Princeton: Princeton University Press (2007).
- Jay Emerson Johnson, "Sodomy and Gendered Love: Reading Genesis 19 in the Anglican Communion", in Michael Lieb, Emma Mason and Jonathan Roberts (eds), The Oxford Handbook of the Reception History of the Bible (Oxford, OUP, 2011), pp413–432.
- McKinnon, Andrew, Marta Trzebiatowska and Christopher Brittain. (2011) "Bourdieu, Capital and Conflict in a Religious Field: The Case of the Anglican Communion", Journal of Contemporary Religion, vol.26, no.3, pp. 355–370.
