= Elizabeth Awut Ngor =

South Sudanese Anglican bishop

Elizabeth Awut Ngor is a South Sudanese Anglican bishop. She serves as an assistant bishop in the Diocese of Rumbek of the Episcopal Church of South Sudan, having been consecrated a bishop on 31 December 2016 by Daniel Deng Bul, Archbishop of Juba. She is the first woman to become a bishop in a province of the Anglican Communion that aligns itself with GAFCON, a conservative Anglican movement that disapproves of homosexuality, and supports affirming traditional Christian beliefs about women and their role in the Church.

== Controversy ==
Awut Ngor's consecration as a bishop had not been publicly announced until the retirement of Deng in January 2018. Her consecration was, however, not secret, and she has attended the South Sudan House of Bishops and been listed in the prayer requests of her diocese's sister diocese (the Diocese of Salisbury in the Church of England).

Her consecration has been controversial. During a meeting of GAFCON primates in 2014, they agreed not to consecrate women as bishops until a task force into the matter had completed their report. Deng had not attended at this meeting of primates. The task force was authorised in April 2015 and titled "Task Force on Women in the Episcopate". It reported in April 2017, and their recommendation was to continue to consecrate only men as bishops for the present time. This conclusion was accepted by the GAFCON primates. However, the Anglican Church of Kenya would later depart from this moratorium and consecrate two women as bishops in 2021.
