= Anglican Diocese of Juba =

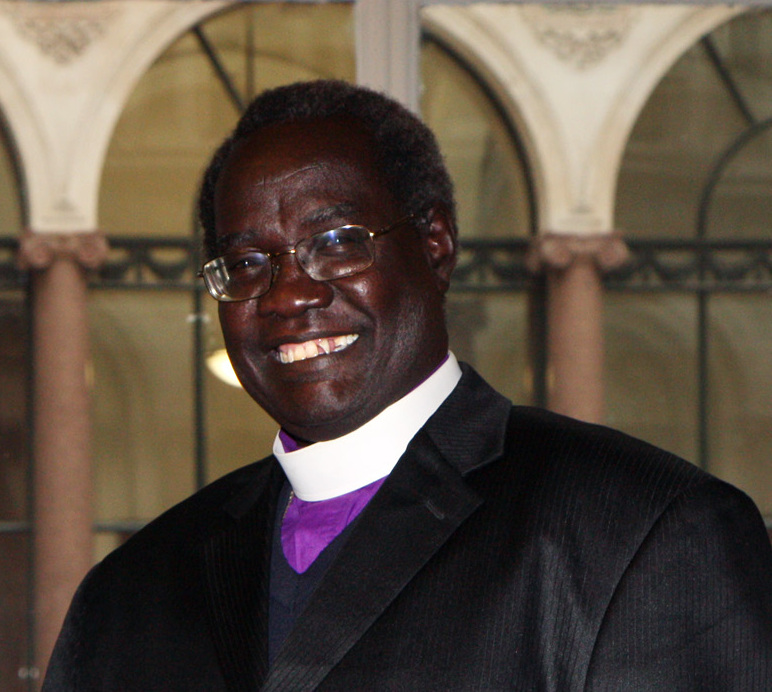
Daniel Deng Bul is the current Archbishop of South Sudan and Sudan

The Diocese of Juba is an Anglican Diocese of South Sudan, with its seat in Juba capital of South Sudan. The bishop of Juba serves as Primate of the Province of the Episcopal Church of South Sudan, and one of several Metropolitan archbishops for that church's internal provinces.

The current Bishop is Daniel Deng Bul and as Primate of the Province of the Episcopal Church of South Sudan, represents the province to the rest of the Anglican Communion, and serves on the international Primates' Meeting. Bishop Deng is titled "Archbishop of South Sudan, and Bishop of Juba".
