= Anglican Church of South Sudan =

The Anglican Church of South Sudan was formed in 2005 when it broke away from the Episcopal Church of South Sudan: its current bishop is Peter Arok.
