= Pacong =

Central South Sudan.

Pacong is a town in South Sudan. The town is located just outside Rumbek on the road to Wulu.

Pacong is also the seat of the Anglican diocese of Pacong. Part of the Province of the Episcopal Church of South Sudan and Sudan. The bishop of the Diocese is The Right Reverend Joseph Maker Atot.
