= Justin Badi Arama =

South Sudanese Anglican bishop

The Most Reverend Justin Badi Arama
- Archbishop and Primate of the Episcopal Church of South Sudan; Bishop of Juba
- Church: Province of the Episcopal Church of South Sudan
- Diocese: Juba
- Predecessor: Daniel Deng Bul

Orders
- Ordination: 1995
- Consecration: 2001 by Joseph Marona

Personal details
- Born: 1964 (age 61–62) Maridi, Sudan

Justin Badi Arama (born 1964) is a South Sudanese Episcopal bishop. He became Bishop of the Diocese of Maridi in 2001, and was elected Archbishop and Primate of the Province of the Episcopal Church of South Sudan and Bishop of Juba on 20 January 2018. His enthronement took place on 22 April 2018. He has been married to Modi Joyce since 1984, and they have four children, two boys and two girls.

== Early life and ecclesiastical career ==
He was confirmed in the Episcopal faith at 16 years old, and his father at the occasion gave him three gifts, a Bible, a pen and a hoe. He was ordained an Episcopal priest in 1995. He has served as cathedral dean, archdeacon and diocesan secretary, before being elected the second bishop of the Diocese of Maridi in 2001.

He was elected Archbishop and Primate of the Province of the Episcopal Church of South Sudan at the House of Bishops meeting at All Saints Cathedral, Juba, on 20 January 2018. He won narrowly the election against Abraham Yel Nhial, Bishop of the Diocese of Aweil, with 80 votes against 79, for a ten-year term. The election was approved by the House of Bishops, with his enthronement taking place in All Saints Cathedral on 22 April 2018.

He was registered to attend GAFCON III, which took place in Jerusalem, from 17 to 22 June 2018, but was unable to obtain a visa. He did however attend G19, an additional conference which took place in Dubai, from 25 February to 1 March 2019, for those were unable to attend the previous year's meeting.

Anglican Communion titles
Preceded by Daniel Deng Bul	Archbishop and Primate of the Episcopal Church of South Sudan; Bishop of Juba; 2018–present	Incumbent
Preceded by Mouneer Anis	Chairman of the Global South Fellowship of Anglican Churches; 2019–present	Incumbent
