= Global Anglican Future Conference =

Anglican realignment conference series, 2008–present

- Abbreviation: GAFCON
- Type: Religious movement
- Classification: Anglican
- Orientation: Conservative Evangelical Anglicanism
- Scripture: Bible
- Theology: Confessional Anglican
- Polity: Episcopal
- Chair: Laurent Mbanda (Archbishop of Rwanda)
- Associations: Global Fellowship of Confessing Anglicans
- Headquarters: Nairobi, Kenya
- Founder: Council of Anglican leaders
- Origin: June 2008; Jerusalem
- Separations: From parts of the Anglican Communion
- Publications: Jerusalem Declaration (2008); Kigali Commitment (2023)
- Official website: www.gafcon.org
- Slogan: "Proclaiming Christ Faithfully to the Nations"

The Global Anglican Future Conference (GAFCON) is a series of conferences of conservative Anglican bishops and leaders.

The first of these conferences was held in Jerusalem from 22 to 29 June 2008 to address the growing controversy of the divisions in the Anglican Communion, the rise of secularism, as well as concerns with HIV/AIDS and poverty. As a result of the conference, the Jerusalem Declaration was issued and the Global Fellowship of Confessing Anglicans was created. The conference participants also called for the creation of the Anglican Church in North America as an alternative to both the Episcopal Church in the United States and the Anglican Church of Canada, and declared that recognition by the Archbishop of Canterbury is not necessary to Anglican identity.

GAFCON occurred one month prior to the Lambeth Conference, the ten-yearly gathering of Anglican Communion bishops. GAFCON stated the movement rose because a "false gospel" was being promoted within the Anglican Communion, which denied the uniqueness of Jesus Christ and "promotes a variety of sexual preferences and immoral behaviour as a universal human right".

This movement is commonly considered to have been prompted by the consecration of openly gay and non-celibate man Gene Robinson as Episcopal Bishop of New Hampshire in 2003, and more generally from the view that some parts of the global Anglican Communion may be departing from biblical teaching.

As of 2025, GAFCON claims to represent upwards of 85% of the world's practicing Anglicans. Peer-reviewed research published in 2016 in the Journal of Anglican Studies, indicates that the GAFCON-aligned provinces represent closer to 45% of practising Anglicans and just over 54% of members baptised in any of the provinces of the Anglican Communion.

== First conference (2008) ==
=== Conference ===
Originally, GAFCON was intended to take place in two parts: a week in Jordan and a week in Jerusalem for the conference. This was also intended to allow participation by bishops from Pakistan and Sudan, who would not be able to deal with the Israeli government. To make accommodations and meet issues raised by the local Anglican Bishop in Jerusalem, the Jordan part of the programme was subsequently downgraded to a "pre-GAFCON preparatory consultation", with the Jerusalem segment upgraded from a pilgrimage to a period of substantive deliberation.

After one day, on June 18, Jordanian authorities closed GAFCON, forcing about 140 people to relocate to Jerusalem. Archbishop Akinola's diplomatic passport was denied entry into Jordan.

The conference took place from 22 to 29 June 2008 at the modern Renaissance Hotel near the outskirts of Jerusalem.

At the beginning of the conference a booklet was released by Archbishop Peter Akinola of Nigeria entitled The Way, the Truth and the Life: Theological Resources for a Pilgrimage to a Global Anglican Future. Delegates also visited sacred sites in and around Jerusalem.

=== Participants ===
The leading participants of GAFCON included seven Anglican primates, archbishops Peter Akinola of Nigeria, Justice Akrofi of West Africa, Benjamin Nzimbi of Kenya, Emmanuel Kolini of Rwanda, Henry Luke Orombi of Uganda, Valentino Mokiwa of the Anglican Church of Tanzania, and Presiding Bishop Greg Venables of the Southern Cone (South America); Archbishop Peter Jensen of Sydney, Australia, Bill Atwood of Kenya, bishops Wallace Benn and Michael Nazir-Ali of England, Don Harvey of Canada, bishops Robert Duncan and Martyn Minns of the United States; Canon Vinay Samuel of India; Hugh Pratt and Canon Chris Sugden of England. GAFCON was attended by 1148 lay and clerical delegates, including 291 Anglican Bishops, from 29 countries. The identities of those attending have not been published and may have included bishops and clergy from outside the Anglican Communion, including some from the Continuing Anglican movement. Hugh Pratt was also treasurer, responsible for security, accommodation and the implementation of the Conference.

The leaders present claimed to represent 35 million "active" Anglicans in the worldwide communion. The leadership team listed by GAFCON on its website consisted of 16 men, of whom 9 were from England, North America and Australia, and one other was UK based.

=== Topics and outcome ===
Daily sessions were held from 22 to 29 June 2008. Sessions were held on the topics of secularism, the Anglican Communion, HIV/AIDS and poverty.

A GAFCON statement was released on the final day of the conference. It was produced based on input from all 1148 delegates.

The statement claimed that the GAFCON movement arose because a "false gospel" was being promoted within the Anglican Communion, which denied the uniqueness of Jesus Christ and "promotes a variety of sexual preferences and immoral behaviour as a universal human right".

The GAFCON statement announced that GAFCON would be a continuing "movement in the Spirit" rather than a once-off event. Although GAFCON did not decide to create a formal schism in the Anglican Communion, it expressed plans to set up new ecclesiastical structures, particularly within the liberal provinces of North America, to cater for conservative Anglicans. Of particular note, the GAFCON statement claims that recognition by the Archbishop of Canterbury is not necessary to Anglican identity. It calls for the formation of a new council of unelected GAFCON primates.

The GAFCON statement was criticized by the then Archbishop of Canterbury, Rowan Williams, who said that "A 'Primates' Council' which consists only of a self-selected group from among the Primates of the Communion will not pass the test of legitimacy for all in the Communion. And any claim to be free to operate across provincial boundaries is fraught with difficulties, both theological and practical."

==== Jerusalem Declaration ====
The GAFCON statement contained the "Jerusalem Declaration", a doctrinal confession which was intended to form the basis of a new "Global Fellowship of Confessing Anglicans" (FCA, now also branded as GAFCON). The declaration upheld the Holy Scriptures as containing "all things necessary for salvation", the first four Ecumenical councils and three Creeds as expressing the church's rule of faith, and the Thirty-Nine Articles as authoritative for Anglicans today. In addition, the 1662 Book of Common Prayer was called "a true and authoritative standard of worship and prayer" and the Anglican Ordinal was recognised as an authoritative standard.

=== Reactions ===
==== Archbishop of Canterbury ====
The Archbishop of Canterbury, Rowan Williams, said on 19 December 2007 that plans to hold a pre-Lambeth meeting for conservatives did not signal disloyalty as such a meeting "would not have any official status as far as the Communion is concerned".

==== Anglican Primate: Presiding Bishop of Jerusalem and the Middle East ====
The Presiding Bishop of Jerusalem and the Middle East (the regional Anglican primate), Mouneer Anis, who is conservative on matters of human sexuality, publicly announced that he would not attend GAFCON, observing that "the Global South must not be driven by an exclusively Northern agenda or Northern personalities". The Bishop of Jerusalem stated that the regional primate's advice to organisers was that "this was not the right time or place for such a meeting", but that his concerns were ignored.

==== Bishop of Jerusalem ====
The Bishop of Jerusalem, Suheil Dawani, in whose territory it was to be held, initially issued a press release saying:

I am deeply troubled that this meeting, of which we had no prior knowledge, will import inter-Anglican conflict into our diocese, which seeks to be a place of welcome for all Anglicans. It could also have serious consequences for our ongoing ministry of reconciliation in this divided land. Indeed, it could further inflame tensions here. We who minister here know only too well what happens when two sides cease talking to each other. We do not want to see any further dividing walls!

He indicated that the regional primate "is also concerned about this event. His advice to the organisers that this was not the right time or place for such a meeting was ignored."

On 12 and 15 January 2008, the Bishop of Jerusalem had meetings with the GAFCON organisers, including Archbishops Jensen (Sydney) and Akinola (Nigeria), in which he explained his reasons for objecting to the conference, and the damage it would do to his local ministry of welcome and reconciliation in the Holy Land. He insisted that the Lambeth Conference was the correct venue for internal discussions. However, he proposed as an alternative, "for the sake of making progress in this discussion" that the GAFCON conference should take place in Cyprus, to be followed by a "pure pilgrimage" to the Holy Land. The minutes of the meetings were published.

==== Former Archbishop of Canterbury ====
The announcement of the conference received criticism from some conservatives due to it potentially giving liberals a more powerful voice at the Lambeth Conference. Former Archbishop of Canterbury, George Carey, said: "If the Jerusalem conference is an alternative to the Lambeth Conference, which I perceive it is, then I think it is regrettable. The irony is that all they are going to do is weaken the Lambeth Conference. They are going to give the liberals a more powerful voice because they are absent and they are going to act as if they are schismatics." Carey also called for the American House of Bishops to commit itself to the Windsor Covenant, which imposes a moratorium on the consecration of homosexual bishops and blessing of same-sex unions.

==== Anglican Communion ====
The Anglican Bishop of Newcastle in Australia, Brian Farran, was critical of GAFCON along with the overwhelming majority of the Australian bishops.

==== Positive reactions ====
The conference was particularly welcomed by bishops in conflict with the official policies of the Episcopal Church of the United States of America. Former Episcopal priest, now suffragan bishop of the Convocation of Anglicans in North America, David Anderson said the "gathering will be in the form of a pilgrimage back to the roots of the Church's faith: thus this journey begins with a pilgrimage."

== Second conference (2013) ==
The second Global Anglican Future Conference was held in Nairobi, Kenya, from 21 October to 26 October 2013, at All Saints' Cathedral.

It was attended by 1358 delegates, 1003 clergy and 545 laity, from 38 countries. The number of bishops and archbishops in attendance was 331. The primates who attended were Eliud Wabukala, of Kenya, Nicholas Okoh, of Nigeria, Stanley Ntagali, of Uganda, Onesphore Rwaje, of Rwanda, Bernard Ntahoturi, of Burundi, Henri Isingoma, of Congo, Daniel Deng Bul, of Sudan, Solomon Tilewa Johnson, of West Africa, Tito Zavala, of the Southern Cone, and Robert Duncan, of North America.

The focus was on the shared Anglican future, discussing the missionary theme of "Making Disciples of the Lord Jesus Christ".

Justin Welby, the Archbishop of Canterbury, made a flying visit to Nairobi on 20 October 2013, immediately ahead of the formal start (on 21 October 2013) of the full GAFCON event. During that flying visit, he met the GAFCON primates who were holding a two-day pre-conference meeting. He also expressed his condolences for the Westgate shopping mall attack and preached two sermons at All Saints' Cathedral.

== Third conference (2018) ==
The third Global Anglican Future Conference was held in the city of Jerusalem, from 17 to 22 June 2018.

It was attended, according to their official numbers, by 1966 delegates, 1292 men and 670 women, from 53 countries, making it the largest international reunion of Anglicans since the Toronto Congress in 1963. These numbers include 993 clergy, among whom were 333 bishops, and 973 lay people.

The number of active and retired archbishops attending was 38, including seven current primates of the Anglican Communion, Jackson Ole Sapit, of Kenya, Stanley Ntagali, of Uganda, Laurent Mbanda, of Rwanda, James Wong, of the Indian Ocean, Nicholas Okoh, of Nigeria, Stephen Than Myint Oo, of Myanmar, and Gregory Venables, of South America. Two GAFCON recognized Primates also attended: Foley Beach of North America, and Miguel Uchôa of Brazil. Primates Justin Badi Arama, of South Sudan, and Maimbo Mndolwa, of Tanzania, were not able to attend, despite being registered. Six retired primates also attended, Peter Akinola, of Nigeria, Eliud Wabukala, of Kenya, Onesphore Rwaje, of Rwanda, Jacob Chimeledya, of Tanzania, Tito Zavala, of Anglican Church of South America, and Robert Duncan, of North America.

The largest single national delegation was from the Church of Nigeria, with 472 members. The number of Anglo-Catholics was smaller than in the two previous conferences.

At the conclusion of the conference, it was announced that in early 2019, Archbishop Foley Beach, Primate of the Anglican Church in North America, will succeed Archbishop Nicholas Okoh, Primate of the Church of Nigeria, as Chair of GAFCON's Primates Council; and Archbishop Benjamin Kwashi, former archbishop of Jos in Nigeria, will succeed Archbishop Peter Jensen, former archbishop of Sydney, as GAFCON's General Secretary.

=== G19 (2019) ===
An additional conference, named G19, took place from 25 February to 1 March 2019, in Dubai, United Arab Emirates, for those who were not able to attend the previous year GAFCON III. G19 was hosted by bishops Michael Nazir-Ali, of the Church of England, and Azad Marshall, of the Church of Pakistan, and was attended by 138 delegates, including 31 bishops and archbishops, and four primates, Nicholas Okoh, of Nigeria, Foley Beach, of North America, both who also attended GAFCON III, Justin Badi Arama, of South Sudan, and Samuel Mankhin, of Bangladesh.

== Fourth conference (2023) ==
The fourth quinquennial GAFCON event took place in Kigali, Rwanda, starting April 16, 2023, at the Kigali Convention Centre. Prominent on the conference's agenda was how the confessing Anglican movement would respond to the early 2023 decision by the Church of England bishops and General Synod to approve prayers of blessing for same-sex marriages. In advance of the conference, Church of Uganda leaders said they would push for Anglican Communion member provinces in GAFCON and the Global South to separate from the Canterbury-aligned structures. True to its early signal, the conference declared that Archbishop Welby should relinquish his role as global leader.

=== Participants ===
According to the conference's final communique, GAFCON IV gathered 1,302 delegates from 52 countries, among them 315 bishops, 456 other clergy and 531 laity. Participants included primates from 10 provinces, including Justin Badi Arama of South Sudan, Foley Beach of North America, Samy Fawzy of Alexandria, Stephen Kaziimba of Uganda, Laurent Mbanda of Rwanda, Henry Ndukuba of Nigeria, Jackson Ole Sapit of Kenya, Miguel Uchôa of Brazil, James Wong of the Indian Ocean and Tito Zavala of Chile. The conference was marked by the participation of not just GAFCON leaders but also several key leaders of the Global South Fellowship of Anglican Churches (including Badi, Wong, Zavala and Rennis Ponniah), who participated the development of the communique. Other participants from within the Anglican Communion included Kanishka Raffel and several delegates from the Anglican Diocese of Sydney, Rob Munro and Keith Sinclair of the Church of England, David Parsons of the Anglican Diocese of the Arctic and Festus Yeboah Asuamah of the Anglican Diocese of Sunyani. GAFCON IV also gathered leaders from several Anglican realignment jurisdictions not recognized by Canterbury, including the Anglican Network in Europe, Church of Confessing Anglicans Aotearoa/New Zealand, Diocese of the Southern Cross, Free Church of England and REACH-SA.

== G26 mini-conference (2026) ==
On 16 October 2025, GAFCON Chairman Laurent Mbanda announced that the GAFCON communion would officially be renamed Global Anglican Communion and its members would select a new primus inter pares instead of the Archbishop of Canterbury. The election was going to take place at the next GAFCON, due to take place between the third and sixth of March 2026, in Abuja, Nigeria, hosted by the Church of Nigeria. It is described as a mini-conference. Mbanda said that in the wake of the appointment of Sarah Mullally as the Archbishop of Canterbury, and the resulting controversy it poses amongst evangelical Anglicans, that "This may be the most significant gathering of faithful Anglicans since 2008." The election for a new primus inter pares never took place.

As of 2025, GAFCON claims to represent upwards of 85% of the world's practicing Anglicans. Peer-reviewed research from 2015 and 2016, published in the Journal of Anglican Studies by Cambridge University Press, indicates that GAFCON-aligned provinces represent closer to 45% of practising Anglicans and just over 54% of members baptised in any of the provinces of the Anglican Communion.

At the G26 conference, Global Anglicans met to "confer and celebrate the Global Anglican Communion". GAFCON declined to elect a new "rival" primus inter pares, instead opting to rename the Primates' Council as the "Global Anglican Council." The new Global Anglican Council was constituted, made up of Primates, Advisors, and Guarantors. Laurent Mbanda was elected chair, Miguel Uchôa was elected deputy chair, and Paul Donison was elected General Secretary by the council. The Abuja Affirmation was published on Friday 7 March 2026.

== See also ==
- Anglican Communion Network
- Anglican Diocese of Sydney
- Convocation of Anglicans in North America
- Global Fellowship of Confessing Anglicans
- Global South Fellowship of Anglican Churches
- Homosexuality and Anglicanism
