= Peter Arok =

South Sudan bishop

Peter Bol Arok is the current bishop of the Anglican Church of South Sudan.
