= Diocese of Wondurba =

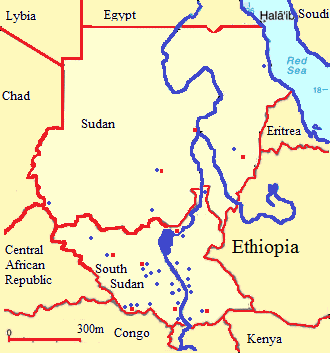
Map of the Catholic(red) and Anglican(Blue) bishoprics in Sudan and South Sudan, 2017.

The Diocese of Wondurba is an Anglican Diocese of the Province of the Episcopal Church of South Sudan and Sudan in South Sudan. The diocese is centered on the region of Central Equatoria.

The Bishop is Matthew Taban Peter.
