= Horace Griffin =

Gay episcopal minister

Reverend Horace L. Griffin is an Episcopal minister and gay man. Griffin is the author of Their Own Receive Them Not: African American Lesbian and Gays in Black Churches, which was released in October 2006.

== See also ==
- LGBT topics and Afro-Americans in the Americas
- Homosexuality and Christianity
