= Global South Fellowship of Anglican Churches =

Ecclesiastical conference

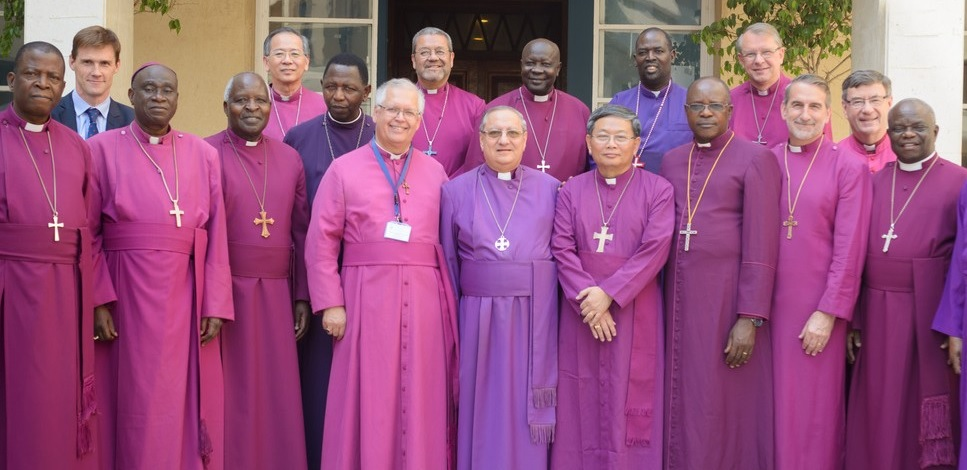
- Primates and bishops of the Sixth Global South Conference in Cairo, Egypt, 2016
- Abbreviation: GSFA
- Formation: 1994
- Founded at: Limuru, Kenya
- Type: Nonprofit
- Purpose: International Anglican cooperation
- Headquarters: Singapore
- Origins: Anglican Communion
- Members: 12 (2025)
- Chairman: Justin Badi Arama
- Vice Chairman: Samy Fawzy
- Secretary: Titus Chung
- Treasurer: Stephen Kaziimba
- Website: www.thegsfa.org

The Global South Fellowship of Anglican Churches (GSFA), formerly known as Global South (Anglican), was originally started as a communion of 25 Anglican churches, of which 22 are provinces of the Anglican Communion, plus the Anglican Church in North America and the Anglican Church in Brazil. The Anglican Diocese of Sydney was also officially listed as a member. Currently, the GSFA is a fellowship of 12 churches, 10 of which are provinces of the Anglican Communion. The GSFA claims to represent some 75% of the world's 110 million Anglicans. This claim is disputed, and peer-reviewed research published in the Journal of Anglican Studies in 2016 indicates a lower percentage.

The provinces identified with the Global South represent most of the Southern Hemisphere and Third World provinces within the Anglican Communion, including all those from Africa, the largest from South America, most from Asia and two Oceania provinces. Global South provinces are characterized by their theological traditionalism on matters of sexual ethics and life issues, and by their evangelicalism in churchmanship.

The GSFA excludes the Episcopal Anglican Church of Brazil, the Anglican Church of Australia and the Anglican Church in Aotearoa, New Zealand and Polynesia, despite the fact that some Australian and New Zealand dioceses were already represented in their meetings, and the Asian provinces of Japan and Korea. The Anglican Church of Southern Africa has previously been represented at meetings. The Diocese of South Carolina, which left the Episcopal Church in October 2012, was accepted into Global South in August 2014 with the Global South temporarily caring for the diocese until 2018, when the now-Anglican Diocese of South Carolina formally joined the Anglican Church in North America following the two formal votes.

== History ==
The Global South encounters started in 1994. The Global South standing gained impetus concerning the controversies over the acceptance of non-celibate homosexuality, as the blessing of same-sex unions and the allowing of non-celibate homosexual clergy was being promoted by the Episcopal Church in the United States and the Anglican Church of Canada. The apex of the controversy took place with the consecration of Gene Robinson, a partnered homosexual, as bishop of the Episcopal Church in 2003. The Global South churches have since then vigorously opposed the legitimacy of any acceptance of same-sex relationships within the Anglican Communion.

Several of the Global South primates attended the Global Anglican Future Conference (GAFCON) that took place in Jerusalem in 2008, as an alternative to the Lambeth Conference. Mouneer Anis the Presiding Bishop of Jerusalem and the Middle East, personally objected to attending GAFCON 2008, believing that "the Global South must not be driven by an exclusively Northern agenda or Northern personalities."

Following this conference, the Global South supported the creation of the Anglican Church in North America, in 2009, as a province in formation of the Anglican Communion and a theologically conservative alternative in the United States and Canada in opposition to what were viewed as revisionist departures that had taken place in these provinces concerning specifically human sexuality and the interpretation of the Bible. Archbishop Robert Duncan of the Anglican Church in North America was present at the Global South Primates Encounter that took place in Singapore, on 19–23 April 2010. The final statement declared: "We are grateful that the recently formed Anglican Church in North America (ACNA) is a faithful expression of Anglicanism. We welcomed them as partners in the Gospel and our hope is that all provinces will be in full communion with the clergy and people of the ACNA and the Communion Partners."

The Global South issued a letter to the Crown Nominations Commission of the Anglican Communion, on 20 July 2012, signed by 13 primates and representatives of other three churches, including the Anglican Church of Southern Africa, expressing the wish that the new Archbishop of Canterbury will remain faithful to the orthodoxy of the Anglican faith and work for the unity of the worldwide Anglican Communion.

The 7th Global South Conference, held in Cairo, Egypt, on 8–11 October 2019, reuniting 101 delegates and observers of 18 Anglican provinces, proposed the creation of the Global South Fellowship of Anglican Churches, with the GSFA Covenantal Structure, which was then approved on their official communiqué. The 8th Global South Conference, also held in Cairo, except that online, on 14–17 October 2021, with the presence of 90 delegates from 16 provinces and a diocese, endorsed the Global South Fellowship of Anglican Churches "as a global body of orthodox Anglicans within the Anglican Communion. It retains its geographical anchorage in the provinces of the traditional "Global South", nurtures its koinonia in the Gospel". It was also decided that in the next conference, "membership in the Global South Fellowship will be based on assent to the Fundamental Declarations of the Covenantal Structure and agreement with the conciliar structures that bind us together as an ecclesial body." On the same occasion, Justin Badi Arama, Archbishop of South Sudan, was elected as chairman.

On 9 February 2023, the Global South Fellowship questioned Justin Welby's "fitness to lead" the Anglican Communion following the Church of England's vote on same-sex blessings. A day later, the Church of Uganda said they did not recognize the authority of the Archbishop of Canterbury. On 20 February 2023, some primates within the fellowship released a statement declaring that it had broken communion with and no longer recognized Justin Welby as primus inter pares of the Anglican Communion, de facto marking a schism within the Anglican Communion. In March, 2023, the Anglican Church of Southern Africa, although not an "ordinary member" of the GSFA, released a statement saying that, while they could not approve of blessings or marriage for same-sex couples, they accepted Archbishop Makgoba's proposal to form a subcommittee to "prepare formal prayers suitable for providing pastoral care to couples in same-sex civil unions." However, while they approved a subcommittee to draft pastoral prayers for consideration, a proposal to bless same-sex unions was rejected by the majority of their bishops.

== Membership ==
The GSFA claims to represent some 75% of the world's 110 million Anglicans. This claim is disputed, and peer-reviewed research published in the Journal of Anglican Studies in 2016 indicates lower numbers.

== Provinces ==
The Global South Fellowship of Anglican Churches' website lists the following provinces, which are also part of the Anglican Communion, as ordinary members:

1. The Episcopal / Anglican Province of Alexandria
2. Church of Bangladesh
3. The Anglican Church of Chile
4. Province of the Anglican Church of Congo
5. The Church of the Province of the Indian Ocean
6. The Church of the Province of Myanmar (Burma)
7. Church of the Province of South East Asia
8. Province of the Episcopal Church of South Sudan
9. Province of the Episcopal Church of Sudan
10. Church of Uganda
11. Province of the Anglican Church of Burundi
12. Anglican Church of Mozambique and Angola
13. Diocese of Sunyani

Ordinary members of the Global South Fellowship of Anglican Churches not part of the Anglican Communion:

1. The Anglican Church in North America
2. Anglican Church in Brazil

Associate members:

1. Church of Confessing Anglicans New Zealand
2. Diocese of the Southern Cross
3. Anglican Network in Europe (ANiE)

== See also ==
- Anglican Church in North America
- Anglican Mission in the Americas
- Anglican realignment
- Convocation of Anglicans in North America
- Fellowship of Confessing Anglicans
- Global Anglican Future Conference
- Global Fellowship of Confessing Anglicans
- Windsor Report
