= Anglican Communion Primates' Meetings =

Meetings of Anglican Communion leaders

The Anglican Communion Primates' Meetings are regular meetings of the primates in the Anglican Communion, i.e. the principal archbishops or bishops of each (often national) ecclesiastical province of the Anglican Communion. There are currently 38 primates of the Anglican Communion. The primates come together from the geographic provinces around the world for discussion and consultation. As primus inter pares of the communion, the Archbishop of Canterbury chairs the meetings, with the Secretary General of the Anglican Consultative Council (ACC) serving as secretary.

"The Primates have no authority as a body and their own national churches determine how their ministry is carried out in their own context. The customs and responsibilities vary between provinces."

The Primates' Meeting was established by Donald Coggan, Archbishop of Canterbury, in 1978 as an opportunity for “leisurely thought, prayer and deep consultation”. The first meeting was held in 1979.

== Recent meetings ==
=== February 2001 meeting ===
Held from 2 to 9 March at the Kanuga Conference Center in the United States, topics of discussion included mission issues, poverty and debt concerns, "Canons and Communion", and the response to the global HIV/AIDS crisis.

=== October 2003 meeting ===
Following the regular primates meeting of May 2003, Rowan Williams, Archbishop of Canterbury, convened an extraordinary meeting of the primates of the Anglican Communion from 15 to 16 October.

The primates gathered at Lambeth Palace in October for a series of closed meetings discussing a way forward because conflict over the Episcopal Church and the ordination of a gay bishop. The primates issued a communiqué at the close of the meeting.

=== February 2005 meeting ===
In February 2005, Anglican Communion Primates' Meeting was held in Dromantine in Northern Ireland from 21 to 26 February. The issue of homosexuality was heavily discussed. Of the 38 primates, 35 attended. The primates issued a communiqué that reiterated most of the Windsor Report's statements, but added a new twist. The Episcopal Church (United States) and Anglican Church of Canada were asked to voluntarily withdraw from the Anglican Consultative Council, the main formal international entity within the Anglican Communion until the next Lambeth Conference in 2008.

=== February 2007 meeting ===
The 2007 Primates' Meeting was held in Dar es Salaam, Tanzania, from 15 to 19 February and reviewed a draft covenant for the Anglican Communion which is in part a response to disagreements between national churches on issues of sexuality and authority.

=== January 2011 meeting ===
The 2011 Primates' Meeting was held in Dublin, Ireland. It was attended by the primates of only 23 of the 38 provinces of the Anglican Communion. A variety of reasons were offered for the absences. The Archbishop of the Congo was unable to obtain a visa. The primates of Mexico and Burma said that they were not well. Four primates cited other engagements: Kenya, North India, Sudan and Rwanda. The Archbishop of Tanzania offered “personal reasons” for his absence, while seven conservative primates boycotted the meeting as a protest against the attendance of the more liberal primates of the Episcopal Churches of the United States of America and of Canada: namely, the primates of the provinces of the Indian Ocean, Jerusalem and the Middle East, Nigeria, Uganda, South East Asia, the Province of the Southern Cone in South America and the Province of West Africa.

=== January 2016 meeting ('Primates 2016') ===
Most of the primates gathered in Canterbury in January 2016. This followed the longest gap between meetings since they were established, during which the Archbishop of Canterbury, Justin Welby, had been visiting primates individually in their home countries following his installation in 2013. A communiqué was issued following the meeting. Its provisions included a "the recommendation of a working group of our members" that the U.S. Episcopal Church suspend its involvement in Anglican Communion "decision making on any issues pertaining to doctrine or polity" as a consequence for taking action in support of adopting policies of marriage inclusivity that coincided with the national law in the United States, and the announcement that the 15th Lambeth Conference would be called for 2020.

=== October 2017 meeting ===
Held again in Canterbury, the 2017 meeting was attended by primates from 33 out of 39 provinces, with three unavailable due to local circumstances and three declining to attend due to disagreements with other members of the Anglican Communion. The GAFCON-affiliated Archbishop of Nigeria, Nicholas Okoh, cited "broken fellowship over homosexual practice, same-sex marriage, and the blurring of gender identity".

A communiqué was issued, indicating that the focus of the meeting was "in particular the challenge of sharing the love, compassion and reconciliation of Jesus with those in need around the world." It included discussions of safeguarding, to denote measures to protect the health, well-being and human rights of individuals, which allow people — especially children, young people and vulnerable adults — to live free from abuse, harm and neglect. The Primates also discussed approaches to sexuality and same-sex marriage, liturgy and pilgrimage, jurisdictional boundaries between member churches, war, and environmental and humanitarian issues.

The same terms which the U.S. Episcopal Church accepted in 2016 for its decision to change their definition of marriage without Anglican Communion consultation was applied to the Scottish Episcopal Church as a result of its own support for same-sex marriage. The result was that until 2020 the Scottish Church agreed that it will "no longer represent the Communion on ecumenical and interfaith bodies; should not be appointed or elected to internal standing committees and that, while participating in the internal bodies of the Anglican Communion, they would not take part in decision making on any issues of doctrine or polity."

=== January 2020 meeting ===
Following a series of regional primates' meetings, Welby called a full Primates' Meeting in anticipation of the 2020 Lambeth Conference, which was eventually held in 2022.

== List of meetings ==
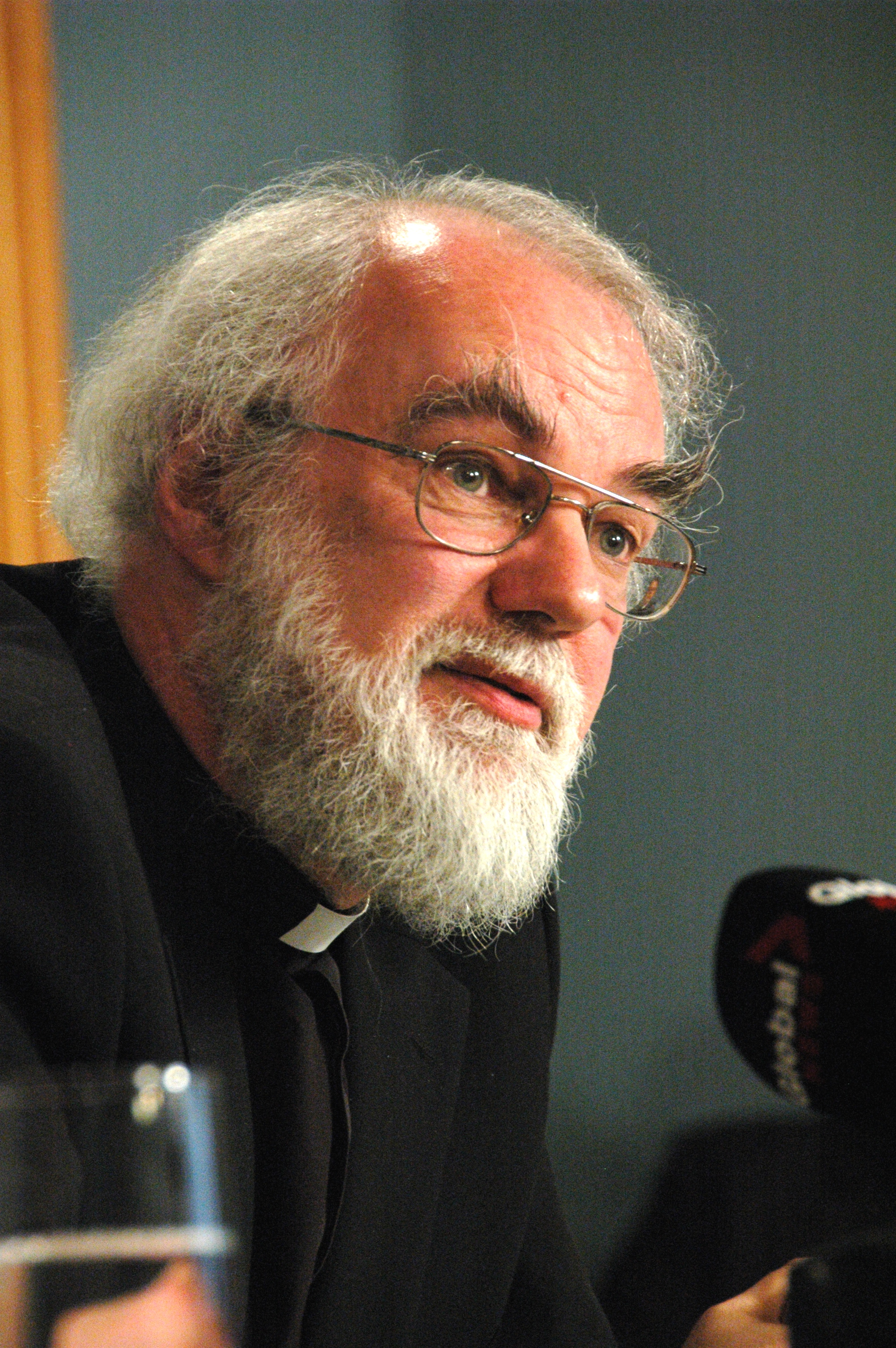
Rowan Williams called an extraordinary meeting in 2003

- 1979: Ely, England
- 1981: Washington, D.C., United States
- 1983: Limuru, Kenya
- 1986: Toronto, Canada
- 1989: Cyprus
- 1991: Newcastle, Northern Ireland
- 1993: Cape Town, South Africa
- 1995: Windsor, England
- 1997: Jerusalem, Israel
- 2000: Porto, Portugal
- February 2001: Kanuga, United States
- 2002: Canterbury, England
- May 2003: Gramado, Brazil
- October 2003: Lambeth Palace, England
- February 2005: Dromantine, Northern Ireland
- February 2007: Dar es Salaam, Tanzania
- February 2009: Alexandria, Egypt
- January 2011: Dublin, Ireland
- January 2016: Canterbury, England (not a Primates' Meeting)
- October 2017: Canterbury, England
- January 2020: Amman, Jordan
