= Journal of Anglican Studies =

- Discipline: Christianity studies
- Language: English
- Edited by: Brian Douglas

Publication details
- History: 2003–present
- Publisher: Cambridge University Press
- Frequency: Biannually
- Open access: Hybrid

Standard abbreviations
- ISO 4: J. Angl. Stud.

Indexing
- ISSN: 1740-3553 (print); 1745-5278 (web)
- LCCN: 2004248255
- OCLC no.: 915879734

Links
- Journal homepage; Online access; Online archive

The Journal of Anglican Studies is a biannual peer-reviewed academic journal focusing on the history, theology and practice of Anglicanism. It was established in Australia in 2003, and was initially published by Continuum Publishers. It is now published by Cambridge University Press.

The founding editor-in-chief was Bruce Kaye, who served until 2013. Andrew McGowan was editor from 2013 to 2020, followed by Peter Sherlock (2020-2021) and Brian Douglas (Charles Sturt University, since 2021).

== Abstracting and indexing ==
The journal is abstracted and indexed in the Arts and Humanities Citation Index, ATLA Religion Database, EBSCO databases, and Scopus.
