= Daniel Deng Bul =

South Sudanese Episcopalian bishop (born 1950)

The Most Reverend Daniel Deng Bul
- Archbishop of South Sudan
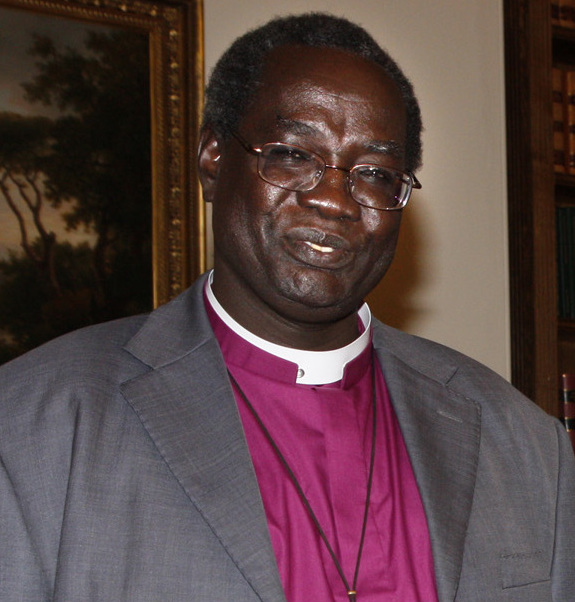
- Daniel Deng Bul in London, 2010
- Church: Province of the Episcopal Church of South Sudan and Sudan
- In office: 2008-2018
- Predecessor: Joseph Marona
- Successor: Justin Badi Arama
- Previous post: Bishop of Renk

Orders
- Ordination: 1978
- Consecration: 1988

Personal details
- Born: 2 January 1950 (age 76)

Daniel Deng Bul Yak (born Tuic-Gebiet, in Bor, 2 January 1950) is a South Sudanese Episcopalian bishop. He was the fourth Archbishop and Primate of the Episcopal Church of Sudan, now called Province of the Episcopal Church of South Sudan, since his enthronement on 20 April 2008 and until his retirement on 22 April 2018. He is married and has six children.

== Ecclesiastical career ==
He studied at Adong Primary School, from 1961 to 1964, earning then his leaving certificate. He later would study at Sudan Intermediate, in Khartoum, from 1971 to 1974. He decided to follow religious life, studying in Bishop Gwynne College, in Juba, from 1975 to 1977, when he won his certificate. He was ordained a deacon in 1977 and a priest in 1978. He was consecrated bishop in 1988 and was bishop of the Diocese of Renk, from 1992 to 2008. He won a certificate from the Corat Africa Leadership Training and Church management training in 1990. The same year he also won a Bishop Leadership training certificate. He earned a diploma in theology at the Virginia Theological Seminary, in the United States, where he studied from 1996 to 1997, and who later would award him an honorary doctorship in 2008, for his work for peace and reconciliation in Sudan. Deng was also caretaker bishop of the Diocese of Malakal, from 2000 to 2003, and of the Diocese of Yei, from 2007 to 2008.

He was elected primate and archbishop of the Episcopal Church of Sudan in a synod that took place on 14 February 2008, being enthroned in All Saints Cathedral, Juba, on 20 April 2008.

He is a supporter of the Anglican realignment, being a member of the Global South and the Fellowship of Confessing Anglicans primates. He supported the decision of the Episcopal Church of Sudan House of Bishops to break communion with the Episcopal Church of the United States at the general synod that took place from 14 to 16 November 2011. At the same time the Anglican Church in North America was recognized as the legitimate Anglican body in the United States.

Deng has been publicly critical of the decision to appoint openly Gene Robinson, an openly gay man, as a bishop. On 22 July 2008 at a public press conference during the 2008 Lambeth Conference, Deng called for Robinson to resign as bishop, and the bishops who had partaken in his consecration to repent. Deng said that he held such a position to prevent a schism in the Anglican body.

Deng attended the GAFCON II, that took place in Nairobi, Kenya, from 21 to 26 October 2013.

He supported the decision to rename the church as Province of the Episcopal Church of South Sudan and Sudan, due to the secession of South Sudan, at the meeting that took place in Bor, from 27 to 30 November 2013.

Deng is vocal on social issues. He is widely known on his advocacy specially during the referendum which led South Sudan to secede from Sudan in 2011. Deng is well known on his work for peace and reconciliation among the communities. He was appointed in 2012 by the President of the Republic of South Sudan as the Chairperson of the Presidential Committee for Peace, Reconciliation and Tolerance to spearhead communities peace process in Jonglei State in South Sudan. Later, he was appointed again in 2013 by a presidential decree to head the National Committee for Peace, Reconciliation and Healing.

His successor, Justin Badi Arama, was elected in January 2018 and enthroned on 22 April 2018.

Anglican Communion titles
Preceded by Joseph Marona	Primate of the Episcopal Church of Sudan; 2008-2018	Succeeded by Justin Badi Arama
