= Province of the Episcopal Church of South Sudan =

Province of the Anglican Communion

- Classification: Protestant
- Orientation: Anglican
- Scripture: Holy Bible
- Theology: Anglican doctrine
- Polity: Episcopal
- Primate: Justin Badi Arama
- Associations: Anglican Communion, GAFCON, Global South
- Headquarters: Juba, South Sudan
- Territory: South Sudan
- Members: 3.5 million
- Official website: southsudan.anglican.org

The Province of the Episcopal Church of South Sudan, formerly known as the Episcopal Church of Sudan, is a province of the Anglican Communion located in South Sudan. The province consists of eight Internal Provinces (each led by an archbishop) and 61 dioceses (each headed by a bishop). The current archbishop and primate is Justin Badi Arama. It received the current naming after the inception of the Province of the Episcopal Church of Sudan, on 30 July 2017.

== History ==
The first major Anglican mission in Sudan was founded in Omdurman in 1899, under the auspices of the Church Mission Society. The mission led to widespread conversion to Christianity throughout southern Sudan. Missionary activity came first under the Diocese in Jerusalem, and then, in 1920, as part of the new Diocese of Egypt and the Sudan, with Llewellyn Henry Gwynne as its first bishop. As the pace of growth continued, a separate Diocese of the Sudan was formed with its own bishop (Morris Gelsthorpe) in 1945. In 1957, oversight for the Diocese of the Sudan was transferred from the Archbishop of Canterbury to the Archbishop in Jerusalem. In 1974, when the Episcopal Church in Jerusalem and the Middle East underwent structural reform, Sudan became an independent province of four dioceses.

Due to continued growth and displacement due to the Second Sudanese Civil War, the province had 11 dioceses by 1993 and has subsequently continued to grow. Many of the dioceses are small. The Episcopal Church of Sudan played a prominent role in the peace process in Sudan.

At the secession of South Sudan, in 2011, the combined province had 5 large dioceses covering Sudan (Khartoum, Port Sudan, El Obeid, Wad Medani and Kdugli), and 26 dioceses in South Sudan. With an estimated number of four and a half million members, with three and a half million of these in the south, the Episcopal Church of the Sudan accounted for almost half of South Sudan's population.

The Episcopal Church of Sudan renamed itself as the Province of the Episcopal Church of South Sudan and Sudan at the meeting that took place in Bor, South Sudan, from 27 to 30 November 2013. It was decided at the same meeting to divide the Church into nine internal provinces – one in Sudan, and eight in South Sudan. One of these internal provinces would be the Central Equatorial Internal Province, whose first archbishop was Paul Pitya Benjamin Yugusuk, son of the late Primate Benjamin Wani Yugusuk, enthroned in Juba on 23 July 2017.

== Creation of the new province ==
At the November 2013 Synod it was resolved to create an internal (or metropolitical) Province comprising the dioceses of Sudan, and other internal provinces in South Sudan, but to maintain the overall unity of the church across Sudan and South Sudan. The Internal Province of the Episcopal Church of Sudan was created, comprising the 5 dioceses situated in Northern Sudan, of which Ezekiel Kondo, the Bishop of Khartoum, was elected the first archbishop on 4 April 2014.

Many in Sudan maintained a longer term view of separating this internal province from South Sudan to full autonomy, with the expectation that the metropolitan archbishop would ultimately become archbishop primate of the new autonomous church. In 2016 a formal application was made to the Anglican Consultative Council (ACC) for the internal province of Sudan to be granted autonomy, and in July 2016 a team led by the archbishop of Adelaide and the vice chairman of the ACC carried out a fact-finding mission in northern Sudan. This team reported back to the ACC to enable a formal response to the application for autonomy. In March 2017 it was announced that the ACC had decided that the internal province of Sudan would become the 39th province of the Anglican Communion, with Ezekiel Kondo, Archbishop of Khartoum, as the first archbishop and primate. The constitution of the new province took place on 30 July 2017, in the presence of the Archbishop of Canterbury, Justin Welby. Since that date, the larger part of the original province has been styled the Province of the Episcopal Church of South Sudan.

== Membership ==
There are approximately 3,500,000 Anglicans in South Sudan. There are around a further 1,000,000 in the Republic of Sudan, which has been a separate Anglican province since 2017.

In September 2018 the province lost one of its younger bishops in an aeroplane crash. The Bishop of Yirol, Simon Adut Yuang, was killed when the aircraft crashed into a lake near Yirol Airport. There were 23 people on board the aeroplane, of whom 20 were killed, including the bishop.

== Archbishop primate ==
The episcopal see of the Archbishop of South Sudan is at Juba. The incumbent serves the whole church as its Primate, but is Metropolitan archbishop only for his own diocese (Juba), as the diocese of Juba stands alone as extra-provincial. He is titled "Archbishop & Primate of South Sudan, and Bishop of Juba". He represents the province to the rest of the Anglican Communion, and serves on the international Primates' Meeting.

In January 2018, the Episcopal Church of South Sudan elected Bishop Justin Badi Arama of the Diocese of Maridi to serve as its archbishop, succeeding Archbishop Daniel Deng Bul, who retired after serving ten years in the office.

All other dioceses (apart from Juba) are part of one of the eight internal provinces, each headed by an archbishop.

There have been five primate archbishops since the province was created in 1976.

Archbishops of Sudan and South Sudan (united as a single province)

1. Elinana J. Ngalamu, 1976–1988
2. Benjamin Wani Yugusuk, 1988–1998
3. Joseph Marona, 2000–2007
4. Daniel Deng Bul, 2008–2017

Archbishops of South Sudan (following separation from Sudan, in the north)

1. Daniel Deng Bul, 2017–2018
2. Justin Badi Arama, 2018–present

== Dioceses ==
The Episcopal Church of South Sudan has 61 dioceses; 60 grouped in 8 internal provinces, and the Diocese of Juba.

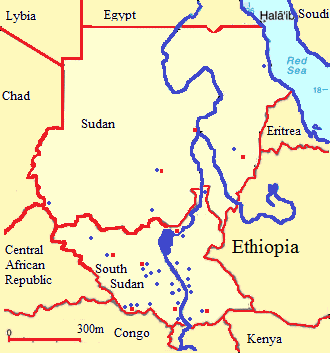
Map of the Catholic (red) and Anglican (blue) bishoprics in Sudan and South Sudan, 2017.

- Archbishop and Primate of South Sudan
  - Diocese of Juba (extra-provincial)
- Internal Province of Amadi
  - Diocese of Lui
  - Diocese of Mundri
  - Diocese of Wandi
  - Diocese of Yeri
- Internal Province of Central Equatoria
  - Diocese of Kajo Keji
  - Diocese of Lainya
  - Diocese of Liwolo
  - Diocese of Lomega
  - Diocese of Morobo
  - Diocese of Mundu
  - Diocese of Panyana
  - Diocese of Rejaf
  - Diocese of Rokon
  - Diocese of Terekeka
  - Diocese of Wondurba
  - Diocese of Yei
- Internal Province of Eastern Bahr el Ghazal
  - Diocese of Akot
  - Diocese of Aluakluak
  - Diocese of Awerial
  - Diocese of Cueibet (Gok State)
  - Diocese of Malek Rup
  - Diocese of Maper
  - Diocese of Nyang
  - Diocese of Pacong
  - Diocese of Rumbek
  - Diocese of Wulu
  - Diocese of Yirol
- Internal Province of Eastern Equatoria (Eastern Equatoria Internal Province)
  - Diocese of Kapoeta
  - Diocese of Magwi
  - Diocese of Nimule
  - Diocese of Torit (Archbishop)
- Province of Jonglei
  - Diocese of Akobo
  - Diocese of Athooch
  - Diocese of Ayod
  - Diocese of Bor
  - Diocese of Duk
  - Diocese of Kongor
  - Diocese of Malek
  - Diocese of Twic East
  - Diocese of Wanglei
  - Diocese of Wernyol
- Internal Province of Northern Bahr el Ghazal
  - Diocese of Abyei
  - Diocese of Aweil
  - Diocese of Gogrial
  - Diocese of Tonj
  - Diocese of Wau
  - Diocese of Wanyjok, Aweil East County
  - Diocese of Nyamlel,
- Internal Province of Upper Nile (Upper Nile Internal Province)
  - Diocese of Bentiu
  - Diocese of Maiwut
  - Diocese of Malakal
  - Diocese of Nasir
  - Diocese of Panrieng
  - Diocese of Renk
- Province of Western Equatoria (Western Equatoria Internal Province)
  - Diocese of Ezo
  - Diocese of Ibba
  - Diocese of Maridi
  - Diocese of Nzara
  - Diocese of Olo
  - Diocese of Yambio (Archbishop)

== Ordination of women ==
The province does ordain women to the priesthood. In January 2018, it was revealed that Elizabeth Awut Ngor had been consecrated on 31 December 2016 by Daniel Deng Bul, to serve as an assistant bishop in the Diocese of Rumbek. This made the Episcopal Church of South Sudan the first GAFCON-aligned province of the Anglican Communion to have consecrated a woman as a bishop. The consecration remains controversial, being contrary to GAFCON official policy which, according to an approved moratorium, does not permit women to be ordained as bishops.

== Anglican realignment ==
The Episcopal Church of South Sudan is a member of the Global Anglican Future Conference and the Global South, and as such has been involved in the Anglican realignment. The House of Bishops of the Episcopal Church of Sudan decided to break communion with the Episcopal Church from the United States, because of their acceptance of non-celibate homosexuality, at their General Synod, held in 14–16 November 2011, declaring itself at the same time in full communion with the Anglican Church in North America. It was decided still to "work with those parishes and dioceses in TEC who are Evangelical orthodox churches and faithful to God". Archbishop Robert Duncan of the ACNA spent the three days of Easter, at 19–21 March 2013, in the province, at invitation of Archbishop Daniel Deng of the Episcopal Church of Sudan. Ezekiel Kondo, of the Internal Province of Sudan, was one of the eight Anglican archbishops that attended Foley Beach enthronement, which took place on 9 October 2014, at the Church of the Apostles, in Atlanta, United States. The House of Bishops decided to formally recognize and to forge a closer relationship with ACNA, following their meeting, held in 25–28 November 2015. At the same time, it was decided to end any formal ties with the Episcopal Church, due to their resolutions that redefined marriage and are not in conformity with the Scriptures, in their view. The House of Bishops also recommended that their Provincial Synod severed any relationship with other province or diocese that approves the blessing of same-sex unions, like the Anglican Church of Canada and the Anglican Episcopal Church of Brazil. They also encouraged all the South Sudanese and Sudanese "diaspora congregations" in the United States to join, wherever possible, ACNA.

The province was represented at GAFCON III, that took place in Jerusalem, on 17–22 June 2018, by a 26 members delegation. Archbishop Justin Badi Arama was registered to attend but wasn't able to get a visa. He did attend G19, an additional conference which took place in Dubai, from 25 February to 1 March 2019, for those were unable to attend the previous year's meeting. In 2026, Anthony Poggo, the Secretary General of the Anglican Communion and a former bishop in South Sudan, supported remaining a full member of the Anglican Communion and discussing any restructuring within the existing Instruments of Communion. The Primate of South Sudan, Justin Badi Arama, did not attend the March 2026 GAFCON Conference in Abuja, Nigeria.

== See also ==
- Religion in South Sudan
- Religion in Sudan
