= Christianity in Malawi =

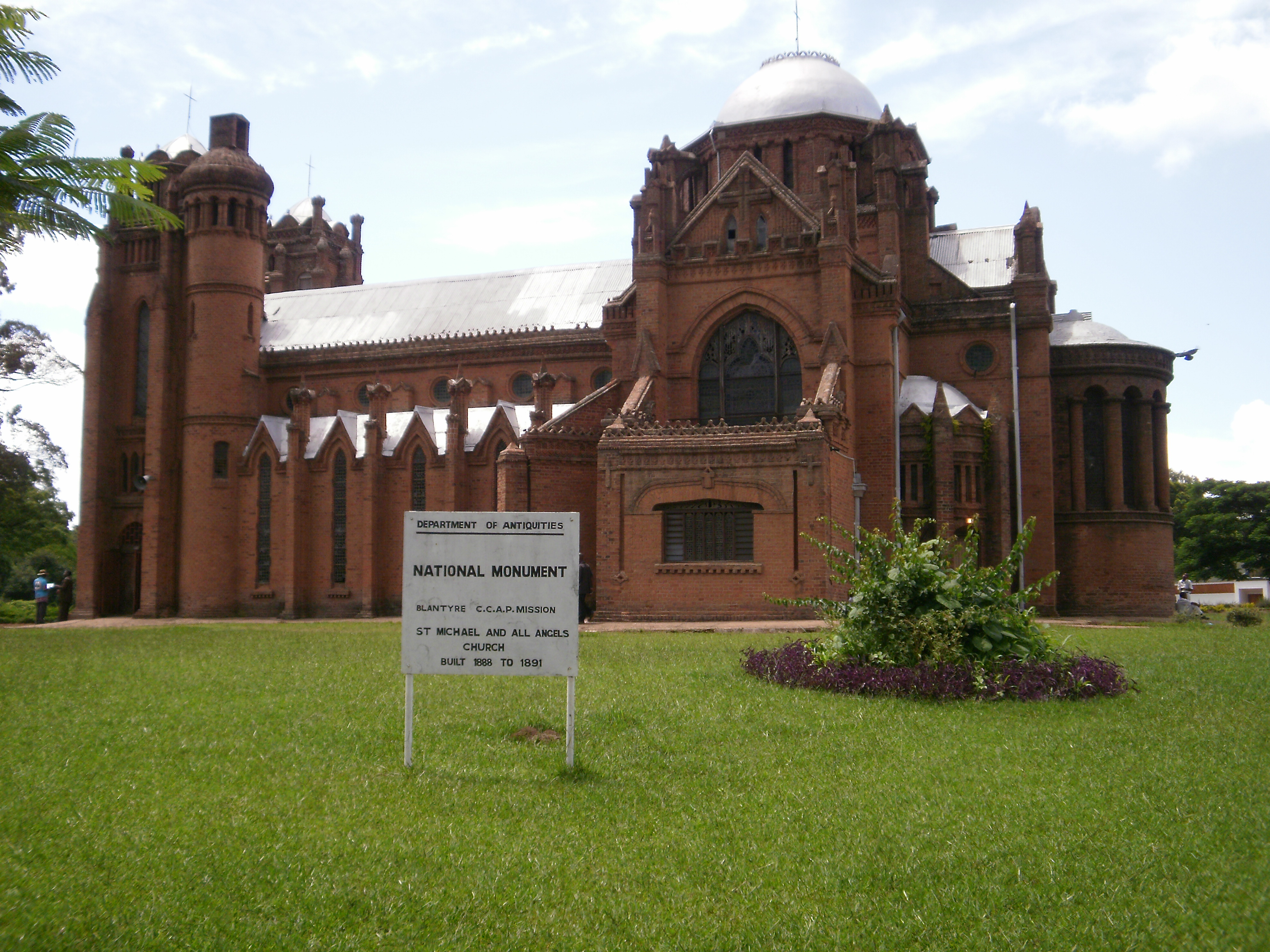
St Michael and All Angels Church, Blantyre Mission in Blantyre, Malawi

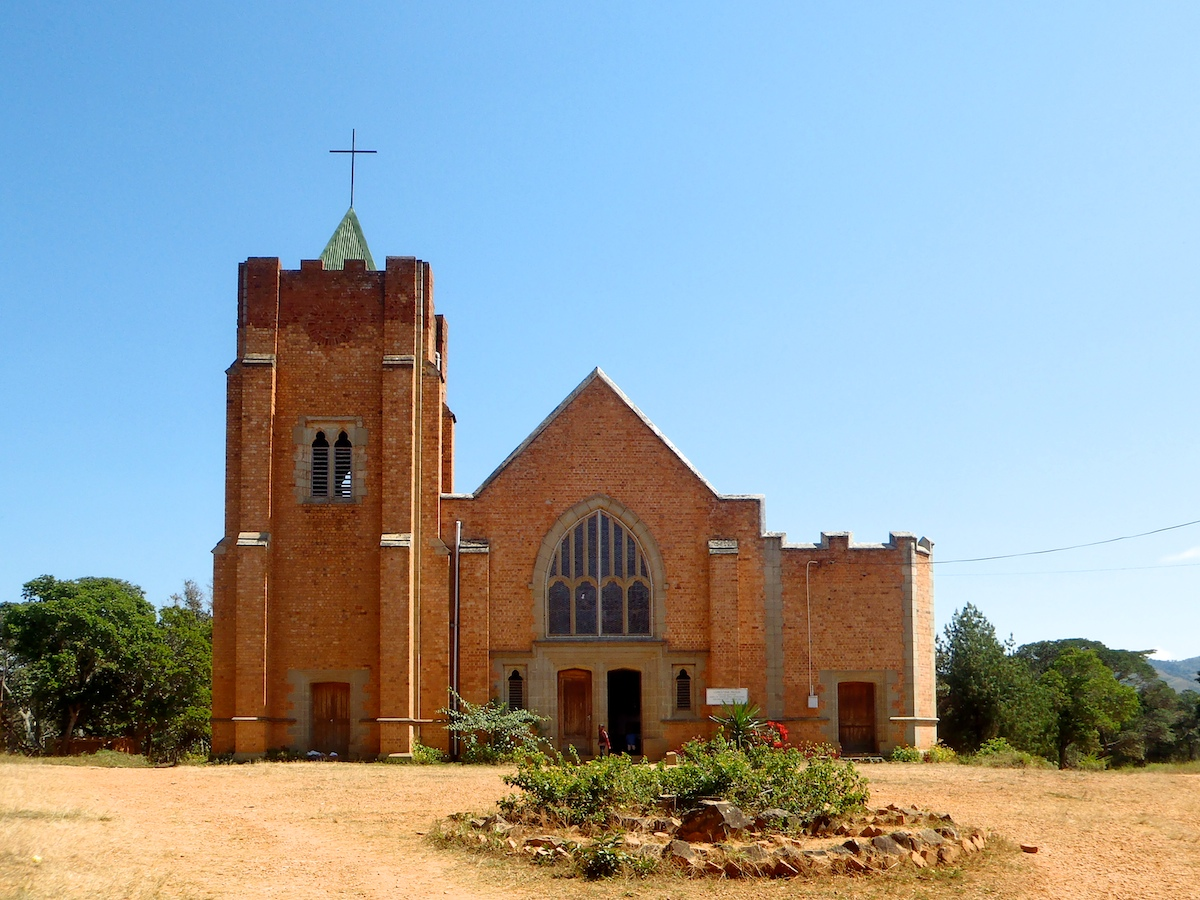
Livingstonia Mission Church

Christianity is the largest religion and a dominant religion in Malawi. According to the 2018 census, 77.3% of the population is Christian. Denominations include Roman Catholics at 36% of the total population, Central Africa Presbyterians at 14.2%, Seventh-day Adventist at 9.4%, Anglicans at 2.3%, Pentecostals at 7.6% and other denominations at 26.6%.

Among the Protestant churches, the Church of Central Africa, Presbyterian is one of the largest Christian groups.

== History ==
=== Nyasaland ===
David Livingstone reached the lake he named Lake Nyasa, now Lake Malawi in 1859. Livingstone's famous appeal, made at a great meeting in the Senate House at Cambridge on December 4, 1857 led to the founding of the Universities' Mission to Central Africa (UMCA), and the first missionary expedition of the Universities' Mission to Central Africa arrived in Malawi in 1861. Missionaries included Bishop Edward Steere, William Tozer, Charles Alan Smythies, Chauncy Maples who drowned on Lake Nyasa, and W. Percival Johnson, a graduate of University College, Oxford, who was to remain in Malawi for 40 years and to translate the Bible into Chichewa language. The Dutch Reformed Church (DRC) established a base at Nkhoma then expanded to other parts of central Malawi, including Mlanda and Mchinji, and into Mozambique, Zambia, and Zimbabwe.

The history of Roman Catholicism in Malawi begins with the entry of French White Fathers in 1899.

=== Independence ===
Malawi's first president, the Presbyterian Hastings Kamuzu Banda, favored Christianity during his long rule. Under Banda many breakaway independent churches flourished, including Elliot Kenan Kamwana's breakaway Jehovah's Witnesses movement.

== See also ==
- Religion in Malawi
- Catholic Church in Malawi
