= Cecil Majaliwa =

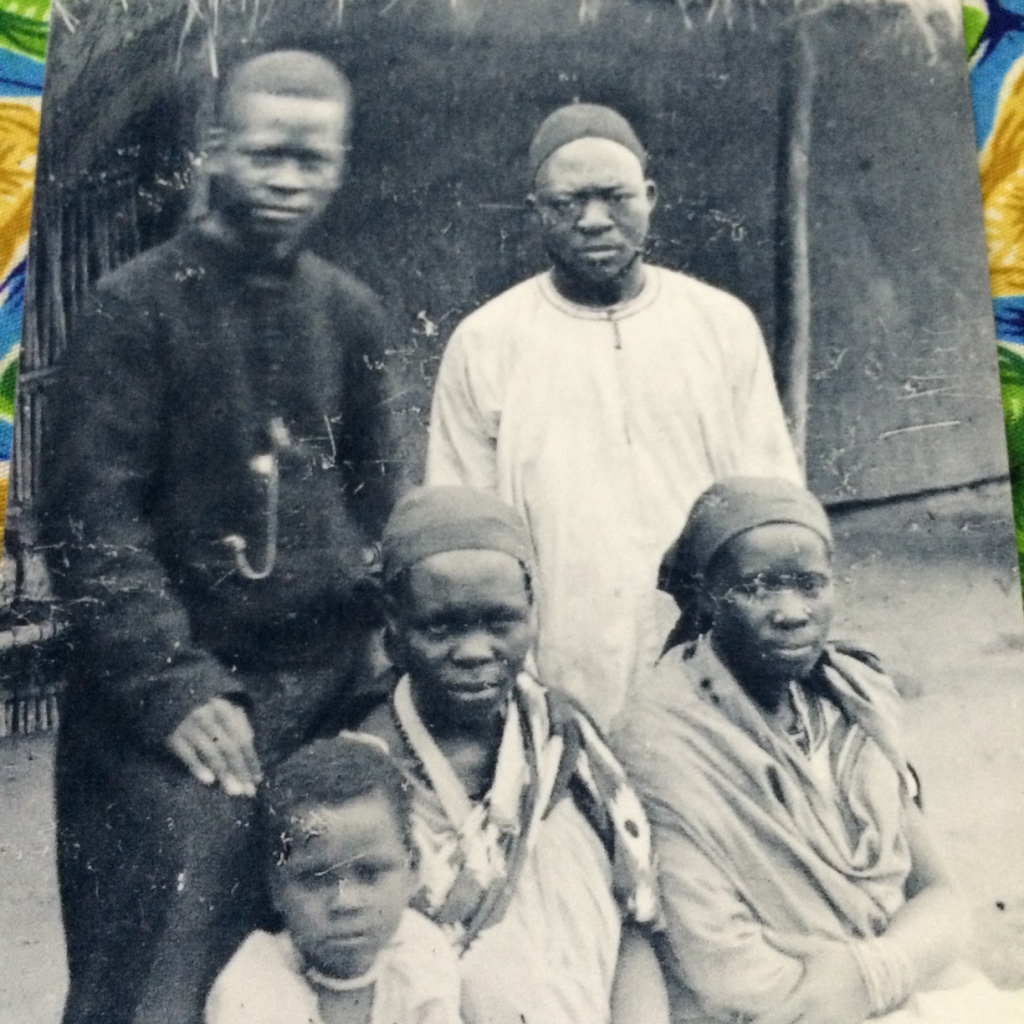
- Majaliwa (in black), c. 1900
- Born: Zanzibar
- Known for: First African priest in Tanganyika

Cecil Majaliwa was a former slave from Zanzibar who became the first African to be ordained as a priest in what is now Tanzania. After being freed, he was educated in Zanzibar and England by the Universities' Mission to Central Africa. He was highly successful during eleven years as an Anglican missionary in the south of the country. However, the European leaders of the mission downplayed his achievements and failed to promote him.

== Early years ==
Cecil Majaliwa was a Yao. At the age of six he was sold in the slave market of Zanzibar. Bishop Edward Steere received him in the early 1870s, and he was educated at the Kiungani school. (Note: Kiungani was a school run by the Universities' Mission to Central Africa in Zanzibar. The pupils were taught to read and write, and to speak English. Some of the first African clerks in the civil service were trained there.) By 1878 he had become a teacher. In 1879 he married Lucy Magombeani, also a teacher and former slave. He became a lay reader and worked at the Mbweni mission. He excelled among the former slaves at Kiungani and around the end of 1883 was sent to St Augustine's College, Canterbury, a missionary college in England. After returning to Africa he worked at Mbweni for a year. In April 1886 he was ordained a deacon.

== Chitangali station ==
=== First visit (1886) ===
The Ruvuma mission was founded in 1880 by William Percival Johnson and four graduates from Kiungani. It was considered much less advanced than the Usambara mission. Majaliwa was assigned to Chitangali in the Ruvuma Mission in June 1886. Chitangali was at the edge of the Makonde plateau escarpment, and had been a place where farmers on the plateau could buy slaves. The plateau provided a place of refuge from Ngoni raiders and a source of food during droughts. (Note: Chitangali is not shown on the 1936 map. It seems to have been northeast of Masasi, roughly where Chigugu (Chingugu) is shown on that map.) Bishop Charles Smythies took Majaliwa to start his "new scheme" in this Yao community. The chief, Barnaba Matuka, had been converted to Christianity at Masasi in 1880 by W. P. Johnson, and had also been taught at Kiungani. Two of Barnaba Matuka's sons had been educated by the Mission, one at Kiungani and the other at Newala. Barnaba Matuka was a likely candidate for being selected as supreme chief (Nakaam) in the region.

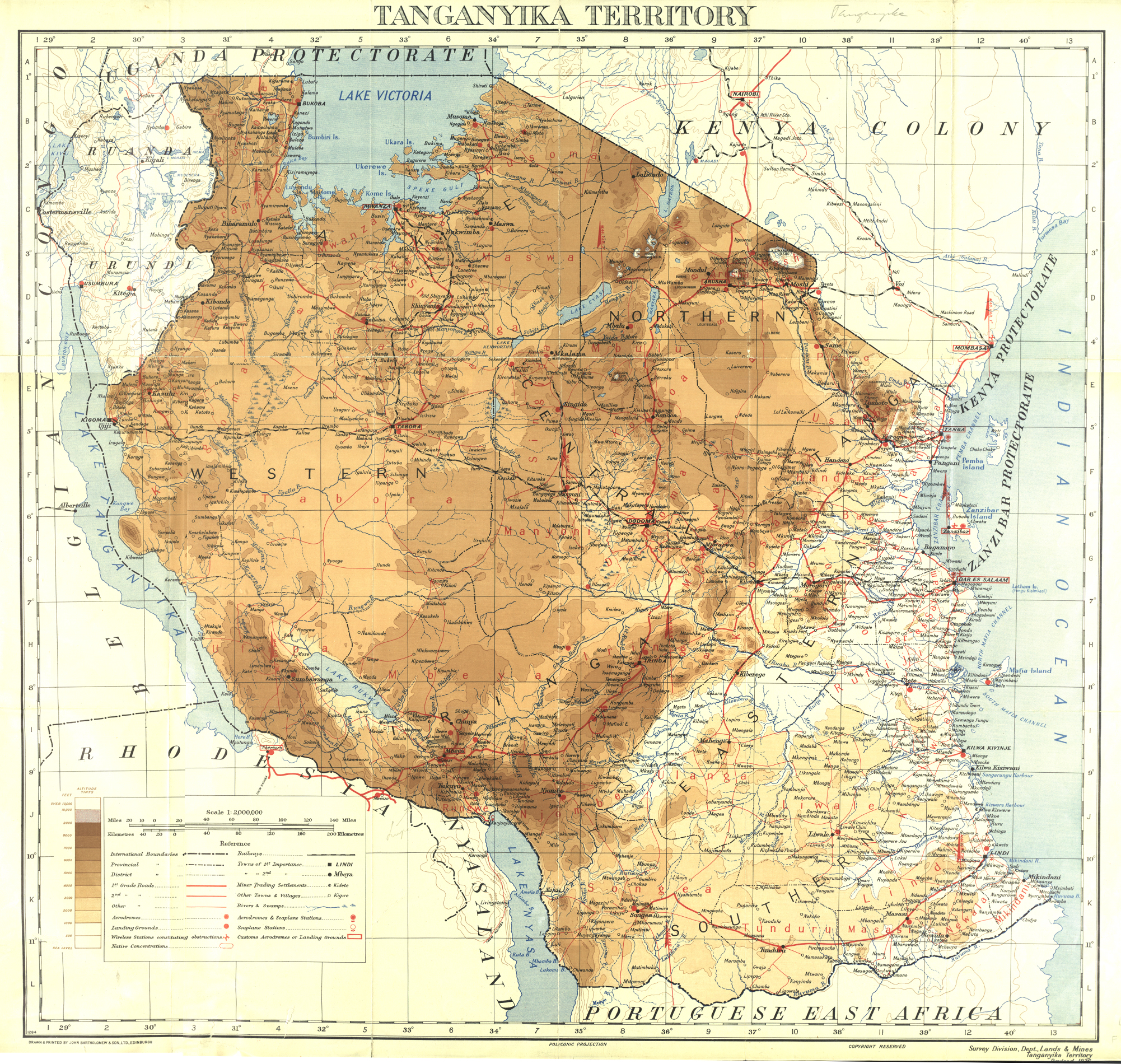
Tanganyika Territory in 1936. Zanzibar Protectorate to the northeast. Lake Nyasa in the south center. The Ruvuma River forms the boundary with Portuguese East Africa. The mission was north of the lower reaches of the river.

The missionaries hoped that freed slaves could bridge the gap between the Europeans and local culture, but this was not always the case. Often the freed slaves had forgotten their native language and lost their ties to their families, or had become urbanized in Zanzibar and did not adapt well to village life. This was not the case with Majaliwa, who quickly learned the local customs and earned the respect of the Yao and Makonde people and their leaders. Most of the villagers could not speak Swahili, but Majaliwa soon became fluent in Yao. He could soon recite the Ten Commandments and the Liturgy in Yao. At the end of 1886 Majaliwa returned to Zanzibar with Bishop Smythies, as had been planned.

=== Second stay (1888–1897) ===
In June 1887 an English missionary reopened the station in Chitangali with Harry Mnubi, a former slave and teacher who had been educated in England around the same time as Majaliwa. In November 1887 Barnaba Matuka was made Nakaam and was confirmed as a Christian by Smythies. His elder son returned to Kiungani and committed to a missionary life on Advent Sunday (27 November) 1887. Msjaliwa heard that the missionary at Chitangali was having little success, and in May 1888 returned there with his wife and children when the missionary left for England on leave.

Majaliwa suffered from the isolation and danger. He had forgotten the language of his childhood, and was also forgetting English. (Note: Majaliwa's first language would have been Yao. In Zanzibar he would have learned Swahili, and then English at the Kiungani mission school.) He wrote "I am left alone in the midst of the heathen like a cottage in the middle of a forest." There was a threat of a Ngoni raid soon after he arrived. Everyone in the village fled to the hills, including Majaliwa's wife and four children, but he remained in the village until the danger had passed. This display of bravery earned respect from the villagers.

Barnaba Matuka constrained Majaliwa's activities and chose which of his followers could convert to Christianity. However, the Nakaam's support made it possible for Majaliwa to focus on teaching Christianity. The Nakaam made most of his relatives Christians, helped run the mission, and discouraged the spread of Islam in the region. His sons also helped as teachers and readers. Majaliwa was forced to improvise, but with the help of the chief's sons built up school attendance to 25–30 children. He caused a sensation by playing a harmonium.

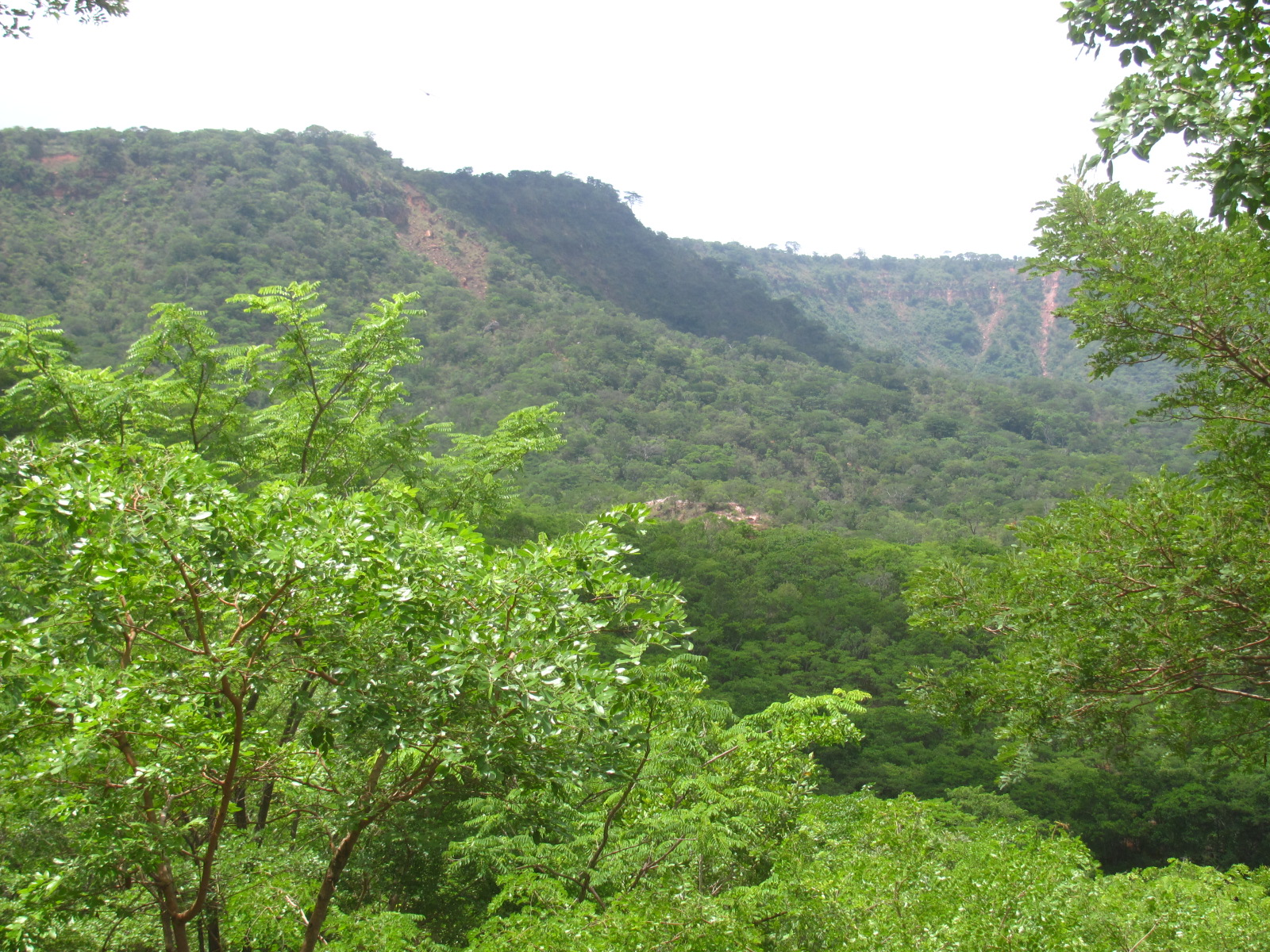
Makonde Plateau escarpment to the west of Chitangali

Majaliwa's efforts were not confined to Chitangali and the Yao people. He visited the people of the Makonde Plateau, where one of the chiefs promised to send his sons and other children to school at Chitangali. He often toured Makonde country, making converts there. He built churches and schools at Miwa and Mwiti. When there was no priest at Masasi he went there to perform the church rituals. He traveled to Newala to hear the confessions of Yao Christians, since no other priest understood their language. Majaliwa used local volunteers for construction and maintenance of churches and for transport of church goods. Through the friends he had made while in England he obtained the money needed for teaching materials, baptismal gifts and school prizes, so his station was as well supplied as those run by European priests.

Majaliwa was ordained as a priest in January 1890, the first African priest in the mission. After six years Chitangali had 86 pupils in its school. 69 people had been baptized as Christians, and 143 were learning about the religion. Six of Majaliwa's pupils went on to become priests, and two became deacons. Bishop Smythies said that the religion of the people converted by Padre Cecil Majaliwa seemed very real. By 1893 the influence of the station at Chitangali extended to a wide surrounding region, and Majaliwa was the leading priest in the Ruvuma district. In 1893 Yohanna Abdallah, the Nakaam's son, stood in for Majaliwa while he was attending the synod in Zanzibar. Abdallah and his assistant Cypriani Chitenge both became priests a few years later.

== Later years and legacy ==
Majaliwa's wife was homesick for Zanzibar. They wanted to return there to raise their children in a civilized place. After eight years Majaliwa asked for leave the take a holiday in Zanzibar, but was refused. He eventually decided to go anyway, and left Mwiti in August 1897 for Zanzibar, where he settled to raise his children. The mission authorities were taken aback by Majaliwa's lack of the subservience they expected from an African. They criticized him for abandoning his mainland missionary work, and downplayed his achievements. The mission's published history omits mention of Majaliwa's subsequent career. Majaliwa lived on in Zanzibar in an uneasy relationship with the mission, and several times was suspended from his duties.

Cecil Majaliwa and Petro Limo helped Percy L. Jones-Bateman and Herbert W. Woodward in their revision of the British and Foreign Bible Society's Kiunguja Swahili translation of the New Testament, published by the Mission Press at Zanzibar.

Majaliwa once said of the disputes between the Christian denominations, "You argue and talk and we have to listen, but when you have gone we shall remember that for all of us Africans the difference is the darkness out of which we came and the light in which we are."

Bishop Smythies had considered making Majaliwa bishop of the Ruvuma district, but his successors William Moore Richardson and John Edward Hine let the idea die. Although Hine was willing to raise African clergy to the rank of archdeacon, when he left this was abandoned too, and the highest rank any African reached in the UMCA missions before independence in 1961 was that of honorary canon. However, Majaliwa's grandson John Ramadhani became a bishop 1980 and the third African Archbishop of the Anglican Church of Tanzania in 1984. Another of his grandchildren, Augustino Ramadhani, became Chief Justice of Tanzania from 2007 to 2010.

== Sources ==
- Conger, George (28 April 2020), "Tanzania's Augustino Ramadhani dead", Anglican Ink
- Iliffe, John (10 May 1979), A Modern History of Tanganyika, Cambridge University Press, ISBN 978-0-521-29611-3
- Mbaya, Henry Hastings (November 2004), The making of an African clergy in the Anglican Church in Malawi with special focus on the election of bishops (1898-1996) (PDF) (PhD Thesis), Pietermaritzburg: University of KwaZulu-Natal
- Mojola, Aloo Osotsi (31 March 2020), God Speaks My Language: A History of Bible Translation in East Africa, Langham Publishing, ISBN 978-1-78368-824-1
- Moriyama, Jermone T. (1 November 2000), "Building a home-grown Church", in O'Connor, Daniel (ed.), Three Centuries of Mission: The United Society for the Propagation of the Gospel 1701-2000, Bloomsbury Publishing, ISBN 978-1-4411-3552-0
- Okoth, Assa (2006), A History of Africa: African nationalism and the de-colonisation process, East African Publishers, ISBN 978-9966-25-358-3
- Ranger, Terence (1979), "European Attitudes and African Realities: The Rise and Fall of the Matola Chiefs of South-East Tanzania", The Journal of African History, 20, Cambridge University Press
- Sundkler, Bengt; Steed, Christopher (4 May 2000), A History of the Church in Africa, Cambridge University Press, ISBN 978-0-521-58342-8
- Wild-Wood, Emma (2017), "Anglicanism in Sub-Saharan Africa, c. 1829-1910", in Rowan Strong (ed.), The Oxford History of Anglicanism, Oxford University Press, ISBN 978-0-19-969970-4
