= Alley & MacLellan =

Scottish engineering firm

Alley & Maclellan Ltd.
- The "Sentinel" logo of Alley & MacLellan
- Industry: Valve manufacturing
- Founded: 1814
- Defunct: 1954
- Headquarters: Polmadie, Glasgow
- Subsidiaries: Sentinel Valve Works, Worcester; Sentinel Waggon Works, Shrewsbury

Alley & MacLellan Ltd was a mechanical engineering company based in Glasgow, Scotland. Its products were sold under the Sentinel brand.

== History ==
Alley & MacLellan was founded in Bridgeton, Scotland in 1875 by Stephen Alley and John Maclellan. The company began by building valves, compressors and other parts for steamships.

By 1880 the company had moved to larger premises in Polmadie, and began building complete ships. Because of the factory location far from the ocean, the ships were designed so that they could be transported in sections and assembled at dockside.

In 1883, the company designed a new type of high speed steam engine which was used to generate electricity on board ships.

The company was incorporated in 1903 as Alley & MacLellan Ltd. with Stephen Alley becoming a partner after his father's death. Their factory in Polmadie was called Sentinel Works. That year the company acquired Simpson and Bibby of Horsehay, Shropshire, a manufacturer of steam powered road vehicles, and by 1905 it was manufacturing steam wagons.

In about 1907 the company began building dump trucks;

The company continued to manufacture steamships and boats, and in 1912 its output was about 2700 tons. Eventually almost 500 small ships and boats were produced. The vast majority of these vessels were assembled at the Jessie Street works using nuts and bolts, then dismantled and shipped as parts in crates to their client destination where they were re-assembled using rivets. At least one Alley & McLellan ship is still in existence – the motor vessel (originally steamship) Chauncy Maples on Lake Nyasa (Lake Malawi).

in 1915 the wagon and truck aspect of the business had grown to the point that the company opened a subsidiary company in Shrewsbury, England as the Sentinel Waggon Works, manufacturing lorries and railway vehicles. A group of the core Scottish staff moved from Glasgow to Shrewsbury.

In 1918 the company was acquired by William Beardmore & Co., Ltd, and opened a second subsidiary, The Sentinel Valve Works, in Worcester, England, to expand its manufacture of valves and associated equipment.

Both factory buildings were modular and prefabricated in Glasgow, for delivery by train and assembly on site, and again a group of core Scottish staff moved to Worcester from Glasgow.

The company manufactured a variety of compressors, including ones used in foghorns.

By 1937, Alley & MacLellan was once more an independent company. But following war work, in 1945 it became a subsidiary of Glenfield & Kennedy Ltd.

Alley & McLellan continued to operate in the original Sentinel Works in Jessie Street, Glasgow until the 1950s, producing various engineering products. The 'Sentinel' name continued to be used for the products of the original Glasgow Works until the mid 20th Century.

In 1975 the company was dissolved.

The original Sentinel Works in Jessie Street, Glasgow was still in existence in 2017 though now in a very derelict condition. The design offices and pattern shop is Category A listed as a building of significant national importance. Designed by Archibald Leitch, it was the first steel-reinforced concrete building in Scotland.

== The Sentinel Waggon Works ==
In 1915, a subsidiary company, The Sentinel Waggon Works was created in Shrewsbury, England, to focus on the production of land-based powered vehicles. Initially these vehicles, lorries, were steam powered. The modern factory was pre-fabricated in Glasgow for rapid assembly giving the local management a state-of-the-art design and production facility.

== The Sentinel Valve Works Ltd ==
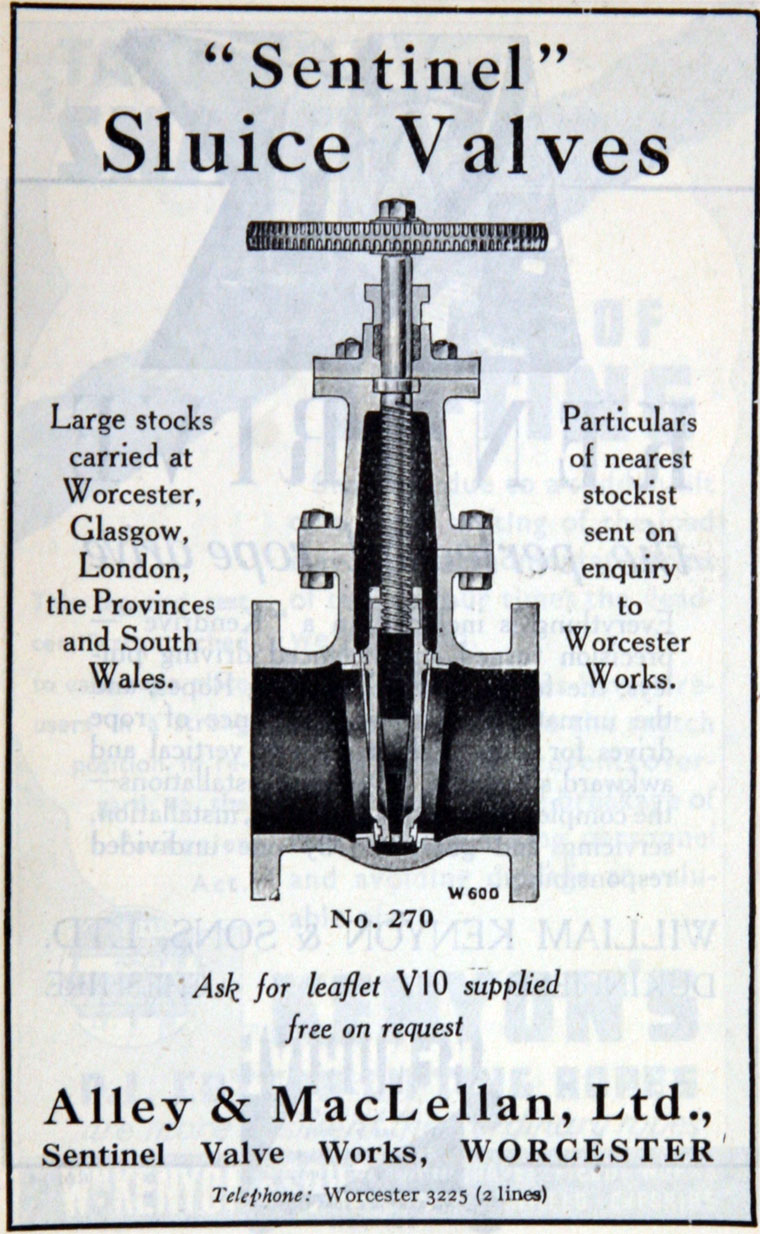
Advert for Alley & MacLellan, 1943

In 1918, Alley & Maclellan formed a second subsidiary company based in Worcester, England, this expanded and continued the design and manufacture of mechanical valves allowing the company to again expand production away from shipbuilding at Glasgow and into new lucrative markets. The original intention was to take advantage of new UK public health rules to provide domestic piped clean water supplies and sewage with the associated water pumping and sanitising works and sewage treatment plants, but over time and with links to the adjacent Worcester Mining Engineering Co Ltd (Meco) factory, they also built valves for the oil industry.
