= Leader Stirling =

- Born: 19 January 1906; England
- Died: 7 February 2003 (aged 97); Dar es Salaam, Tanzania
- Citizenship: English, Tanzanian (1961)
- Education: Bishop's Stortford College, University of London
- Medical career
- Profession: doctor, surgeon, medical missionary
- Institutions: London Hospital

Leader Dominic Stirling (19 January 1906 – 7 February 2003) was an English missionary surgeon and former Health Minister in Tanzania. Born in Finchley, England and raised in Sussex Weald, Stirling attended Bishop's Stortford College and the University of London. After a brief period of general practice, Stirling joined the Universities' Mission to Central Africa and was deployed to Tanzania. He spent 14 years of service to the UMCA in Lulindi. He then converted to Catholicism and joined the Benedictine Mission, working with them in Mnero, where he built another hospital. After 15 years he left to Kibosho, on the slopes of the Kilimanjaro, where he worked for 5 more years. During his medical missionary career, he emphasised the training of local nurses, establishing a precedent for official nurse recognition in Tanzania. His experience in Africa eventually led him to the political career, and in 1958 Leader Stirling was elected (unopposed) to the first Parliament of Tanzania. He held this position for the next 22 years, being the last 5 as Health Minister by appointment of Julius Nyerere. Besides his medical and political work, Stirling was also interested in Scouting. His successful efforts to establish a Scout movement in Tanzania eventually led him to the post of Chief Scout of Tanzania in 1962, following the formation of the Republic.

== Early life: 1906–1929 ==
Leader Stirling was born in England in 1906, the first of 4 siblings. His was of a family of ancient Scots and also of doctors, including his uncle Harold Leader, who was a children's physician, his great-uncles Henry Pye-Smith and Rutherford Pye-Smith, and the cousins Charles Pye-Smith, a surgeon, and Jack Pye-Smith, all Physicians of the Guy's Hospital. He was also cousin of David Stirling founder of the Special Air Service. The surgical talent seemed to have blossomed in him at early age, when, in 1911, Stirling surprised his mother after she saw him sewing a ripped teddy bear. Although having encouragement by his family and even a natural curiosity, the choice for the medical career was only taken in his last year at the Bishop's Stortford College, where his Headmaster received the news as a "startling new development". Decided, he applied for scholarships on Oxford and Cambridge but was not accepted. He then joined the University of London in 1924 and chose the London Hospital as his medical school. He borrowed £1,000 from his father to pay his studies, money he was later able to pay back.

=== Medical training: 1924–1929 ===
The 5 year medical course consisted of 1 year of pre-medical studies at the East London College, now Queen Mary College, where he basically studied zoology. During his first year he was also a surgical dresser in the London Hospital when he had his first hands-on experiences with medical practice. In 1925 he began his second year of medical school, now studying at the London Hospital, which was followed by 3 years of clinical course. He graduated from medical school in July 1929, qualifying MRCS and LRCT in the same year. He graduated MBBS, and later, in 1993, was elected FRCS, a very honourable and rare happening.

== Early career: 1929–1935 ==
Dr. Leader Stirling's first job was as a Clinical Assistant in the Children's Out Patient Department at the London Hospital. After 3 months he got another position as a Clinical Assistant to Surgical Out-patients at that same institution for 3 more months, when he finally got a Resident Appointment at the London Hospital, as a House-Surgeon to the sixth Assistant Surgeon, Sir Hugh Cairns. While working for Dr. Cairns, he met with Dr. Harvey Cushing, an experience he describes as "one of the great moments of my life".

After his House-Surgeon job, Stirling took a ten days locum in a 1000-bed mental hospital, his first experience with the field. He would later help develop the first national mental health service in Tanzania. He then continued his work at the London Hospital as a Receiving Room Officer, then House Physician, and ultimately Resident Accoucheur, the most senior resident appointment. He deemed himself "very, very lucky" for he got all the House Appointments he wanted and, hence, completed 3,5 years of his early career as a junior staff at the London Hospital.

In 1933 Leader Stirling left the London Hospital to work in a private practice in South London as a surgeon. He then worked as Outpatient Surgical Officer at a nearby hospital from his private practice for a brief time, when he finally decided to "continue the upward climb on the ladder of specialization". He applied for Medical Officer to the General Post Office, Resident Medical Officer to Hertford Hospital and Deputy Medical Superintendent to Sunderland Infirmary. He got interviews for all of those positions but was undecided. It was 14 January 1935, when Leader Stirling received a letter from the Universities' Mission to Central Africa (UMCA), asking, "A doctor is urgently needed at Masasi. Can you come?" calling him to do Missionary Work in Africa. This he describes as the event when he "kicked away the ladder" (of specialisation).

== Missionary career: 1935–1969 ==
=== Arrival in Africa ===
3 months after his decision to join the UMCA, Leader Stirling landed in Zanzibar, then the port of entry to Tanganyika. The UMCA mission in Zanzibar had been well established by another notable missionary, Miss Annie Allen, in 1878. He continued to Masasi, where he could be of more use, to join Dr. Frances Taylor, who was covering 10,000 square miles by walking 20–30 miles a day on foot to practice medicine. She was, according to the Bishop of the mission, "perhaps the most over-worked person in the diocese". His arrival was met with great enthusiasm by the mission: "the most joyful thing that has happened medically for a very long time".

The Masasi Mission Hospital was "in a primitive state" according to Dr. Stirling, the structure being a thatched hut of rammed earth with no running water. However, they had a laboratory and an operating theatre, and would treat around 300 patients on a normal day's work. On a year they would have 1,000 new admissions and 5,000 new outpatients.

Dr. Frances Taylor and Dr. Leader Stirling then divided the area and while the first would be based in Masasi, Stirling would relocate to Lulindi.

=== Lulindi: 1935–1949 ===
Lulindi was then a very isolated African village with the nearest Post-Office being 24 miles away and with no proper medical infrastructure. Leader Stirling would live here in the next 14 years, from 1935–1949. In that time he built the Lulindi Hospital and the Newala Hospital, being the sole doctor in these two and also the Luatala hospital. He also built numerous Dispensaries, a Nursing School and started a Scouting group.

==== Lulindi Hospital ====
The building of the 80 bed hospital took 3 years to complete. This hospital was in memorial to the late Dr. Culver James, whose legacy provided much of the funds. Dr. Stirling was intimately involved in this development, since he drew the scale-plans, selected a site, marked the foundations, employed brick makers, brick carriers, brick burners and bricklayers, and cut suitable trees into planks. He then had the help of the mission carpenter in making windows and doors and local masons on trimming stone for foundations and floors. For this project he also had the assistance of his uncle, a civil engineer, and his brother-in-law, a military engineer who corresponded with him from England. Besides the more technical chores, Leader Stirling also had a "small manual component" in the building of the hospital, completed in 1938. Since the initial installations were not enough, in 1946 Leader Stirling added four new wards, store-rooms and nurses' and dressers' rooms, "completing his plan for the main block, including the hospital chapel.".

The Lulindi Hospital facilities in 1946 included a surgical theatre, an outpatient department, a maternity block, a laboratory, a pharmacy, patient wards, store-rooms, nurses' and dressers' rooms, a hospital chapel, an x-ray machine and a built-in wood stove for sterilisation.

==== Newala Hospital ====
Simultaneously with the construction of the Lulindi Hospital, he also designed and built the Newala Hospital. For this he had the help of Sister Anne, who supervised the construction of the 50 bed building. Built in one of the highest populated areas of Tanzania, the hospital began to receive 300 patients daily, increasing to 400 and later more than 500.

==== Dispensaries ====
Leader Stirling also established and maintained a chain of 20 dispensaries to fill the lack of medical infrastructure in the region comprehending "almost to the coast and right down to the Mozambique border, the furthest a hundred miles from Lulindi".

==== Visits to Nairobi ====
Leader Stirling was also invited two times to visit the capital of Kenya, Nairobi. In his first visit in 1940 he was invited to discuss the brink of an epidemic of malaria, brought by troops during World War II and unknown to Nairobi until then given it sits 5,500 feet above ocean level. Soldiers sent to Addis Ababa also brought back home syphilis.

He was then summoned in 1942 by a friend to help with a plague epidemic.

=== Mnero: 1949–1964 ===
14 years after his arrival in Lulindi Stirling converted to Catholicism and had to leave the UMCA. Leader Stirling learned the Catholic faith at age ten, which he considered his true faith, but joined the Church of England as a student due to influence of friends. However, after some time in Africa he became convinced that locals should hear "the faith once delivered to the Saints", and not a European reformed faith. After hearing his formal request for reunion of the Churches was ignored by the 1948 Lambeth Conference, he and 5 more missionaries left the UMCA. A.G. Blood, however, only mentions the departure of 3 missionaries at that time, writing that Dr. Leader Stirling and Fr. Birch left the Anglican Church following Canon Denniss, the Priest-in-charge in 1949: "all three had given good service but had become unsettled by events in the Church outside the diocese.".

Leader Stirling's departure was reckoned by the UMCA as "'a very great loss to the medical work of the diocese; but we owe him many thanks for his fourteen years of work with us.' And not only for his medical work, for he had also done a great deal of building and done very much to strengthen and establish over a wide area the Scout movement which was providing itself an asset of ever-increasing value in the diocese.".

Stirling joins the Benedictine Mission and is sent to found a new hospital in Mnero; Mnero Diocesan Hospital. The hospital was founded in the early 1950’s, next to the Benedictine Mission of Mnero. The mission itself was built in 1914, and was one of the earliest places of Benedictine missionary activities in (the former) Southern Tanganyika. This time, though, he has the help of an architect builder from the mission. This meant he could dedicate himself more to the medical work which, in 1958, he describes as follows

I had been working single-handed for nearly 24 years, and now had to deal with eighty beds always full, several hundred outpatients daily, a weekly leprosy clinic of 400, teaching and administration of a nursing school and its hostel, general administration of the hospital, visiting a dozen remote dispensaries, and performing up to twenty operations per week. My day began at 5 am and I was hard at it until bedtime, about 11 pm.

— Leader Stirling, Africa: My Surgery

The first Medical Director of Mnero Hospital, Dr. Leader Stirling, led the construction of the hospital. Thereafter, Dr. Stirling worked for 14 years in the hospital

Besides the Hospital, Leader Stirling also built a male Nurse School, started yet another Scouting group and starts his political career.

Upon the arrival of a new Matron to the hospital in 1964, Leader Stirling was accused of trying to be "forcing the pace of Africanization" in the hospital. The quarrel led to his resignation in that same year.

=== Kibosho: 1964–1969 ===
Leader Stirling departed Mnero to Dar es Salaam and met the Bishop of Moshi who appointed him to a position in Kibosho, at the slopes of the Kilimanjaro where he was supposed to start a new hospital. This time he had little involvement in the construction of the hospital, made entirely out of local effort, and his job "was to bring the buildings into line with medical requirements. (...) and then I had to organize the equipment and the staffing.". After working in Kibosho for 5 years and staffing the hospital entirely with locals, including a local doctor, Leader Stirling moved to Soni, a village in the Usambara Mountains.

=== Soni: 1969–1973 ===
At Soni Leader Stirling settled in and would work as a part-time visiting surgeon to two local hospitals: Lushoto Government Hospital and Bumbuli Church Hospital, in the latter he was also part-time professor at the Medical Assistant Training School.

In 1973, following his ever-increasing political involvement, he was placed on a Presidential Commission moved to Dar es Salaam, then capital of the country. This meant the end of his formal medical practice. He would return to the practice of medicine after his retirement at age 75, although informally and sporadically at the request of those who came to him at his house.

== Political career: 1958–1980 ==
=== Parliamentary: 1958–1975 ===
"How on earth had I got there, and what happened to the obscure missionary doctor? Well, even if he had unavoidably become a little less obscure, he was still doctoring and still a missionary; in fact it was his activities as a missionary doctor that had landed him in this quite unexpected situation. If you have been doctoring in an area for twenty years and more, you are bound to come to share your patients' interests, to understand their troubles, and to join hands in trying to overcome their difficulties."

—Leader Stirling

Leader Stirling first experience with politics was at the age of 18. During a school debate he made a "burlesque political speech" which prompted his schoolmaster to jokingly say that "Stirling will undoubtedly become a politician". He never thought that he would follow that career, though, as his father would say that "politics is a dirty game". However, in 1958, at the age of 52, Stirling made his first public speech in Mnero, being the chairman of this event Julius Nyerere. This meeting was historic, being the opening of the campaign that would lead the Southern Province of Tanganyika to elect its first representative to Parliament.

While his speech was actually to support an Indian colleague running for that district, Leader Stirling was also running for Parliament for the TANU party representing Southern Tanzania. He was elected in 1958, unopposed, but would have to run again in 1960, as one part of the agreement of independence was the formation of a more representative Parliament. Racial quotas were still in place and the District of Mbeya and Chunya was in need of a TANU candidate to represent its whites. Leader Stirling then ran for that district, even though Mbeya was 700 miles away and the roads were in bad condition. He won his second election against a European coffee-farmer in 1960. He would manage both activities as a parliamentary and missionary doctor since his "24 years of single-doctoring" were over at Mnero.

Tanganyika gained independence in 1961 and the "Parliament of Freedom" ended its 5-year course in 1965. Leader Stirling had recently moved to Kibosho, where he wasn't popular enough to run and also too distant from Mbeya. His political career might have come to a halt if it wasn't for the fact that the University of Dar es Salaam appointed him to run for a National Seat. He was elected and would keep his Parliamentary seat until 1980 after winning subsequent elections.

For being seen by his peers as someone with "a nose for irregularities and discrepancies", he was involved in several committees and commissions, to the point of being placed in 27 committees simultaneously. In 1973 he was placed on a Presidential Commission and called by the President's Office to live in Dar es Salaam, then capital of the country. His work on this commission was peripatetic and aimed on the retrenchment of public expenditure. He travelled several thousand miles and visited 60 Districts and Regions for irregularities. At that same time he was chairman of the Health Committee of the National Planning Commission and chairman of the Board of the National Food and Nutrition Centre. He was also the chairman of the Special Commission of Inquiry into deaths in the sisal industry, historically a very important industry in Tanzania. He informs that his report on the poor labour conditions brought improvements. Another position he held was chairman of a Commission to investigate the National Provident Fund, early Tanzania's social security program. The commission eventually was made a board of trustees which granted him a permanent chair. After 6 months on this position a new government was formed and he was appointed Minister of Health by President Julius Nyerere in 1975.

"While the health services of this country are so meagre – and meagre is, I may say, a polite word – we should be ashamed to cut one cent from the medical estimates, police or no police. I said our services are meagre. What comfort, Sir, is a fine Hospital (in) Dar es Salaam to the people who are dying out in the bush, twenty, thirty, forty, even fifty and more miles from the nearest doctor? Of course they don't all die. I remember one man who crawled on hands and knees (15 miles) into a hospital with only one foot: he said the other foot had dropped off in the road …… I remember a boy with a broken thigh-bone, carried doubled up in a piece of sacking, without even a splint, suspended on a pole, 50 miles to the nearest hospital. Sir, I could go on like this all day, but I would rather spare the House. But let no-one begin to think that we have reached a point where we can cut one cent in reduction of our health services. I would remind the House, Sir, of ….. things that are so common they have become taken for granted. Malnutrition – a nasty word, ——— Parasitic diseases, ——— In many areas the incidence of hookworm infestation is between 50 and 100 per cent of the population. The same is true of bilharzia —— These are the great debilitating, energy-sapping, initiative killing diseases —— As for malaria, the conditions in the greater part of our country are such that the indigenous population simply cannot live without it ——— and tuberculosis in the present condition of the country is a killing disease. The Health Estimates mean life and death in this country; they must not be reduced!"

—Leader Stirling, speech during his first parliamentary years

=== Minister of Health: 1975–1980 ===
Leader Stirling describes his function as Minister of Health as being "generally expected to be a fairly constant stream of new legislation to improve the national health or whatever his responsibility happens to be. I did in fact introduce a number of bills to improve nutrition, hygiene, drug supply, medical research and so forth.". Indeed, while Minister, Leader Stirling started the Tanzania National Tuberculosis and Leprosy Program, unifying the scheme of treatment and extending it to the whole country. This program is still in place. He also implemented reforms in the mental health scenario of the country, equipping all major hospitals of the country with psychiatric units. As a result, non-criminal mentally ill individuals who were put in prison because there was not enough mental asylums in the country were transferred to the nearest government hospital "imprisonment for being simply mentally sick, with no criminal charge, is now a thing of the past in Tanzania".

During his time as parliamentary he would support government funding of Church Mission Hospitals, which were being neglected. When appointed Minister of Health this issue was resolved by unification of the healthcare system bringing together religious and governmental health facilities. In 1978 Tanzania had more than 3,000 dispensaries and approximately 140 hospitals in total, while having around 8,000 villages. Their aim was to have one dispensary in every village. This scheme of rural medical assistance was adopted worldwide. Another measure of public health policy was to unify the Nursing registry, which was separated between home-trained and foreign-trained (mainly England-trained) nurses.

Leader Stirling attended to the International Conference on Primary Health Care in Almaty (former Alma-Ata) from which originated the Alma Ata Declaration. He met with the Minister of Health of the Soviet Union during this event. In 1980, on his last year as a Minister, he chaired the Commonwealth Health Ministers meeting prior to the World Health Assembly in Geneva.

In 1979 he idealised and lobbied for a bill that would regulate and nationalise the small private practice in then socialist Tanzania. The bill met some resistance due to widespread ignorance about its contents. He recounts that when election time came, urban "crypto-capitalists" had financed an effort to secure his defeat. Hence he was, for the first time in 22 years, defeated at a Parliamentary election and went into retirement at age 75.

== Medical work ==
Leader Stirling had a vast experience with all sorts of illnesses and medical problems during his work in his 3 hospitals. He was also responsible in organising hospital work and routine. Eventually, he developed his unique modus operandi which he describes as:

The hospital was open 24 hours a day and there was always someone to receive a patient, even in the middle of the night. However the full working staff were on duty from 8 am until the day's load was dealt with, which was usually about 5 or 6 pm but might be later. The nurses of course came on and off in shifts, but the doctor and the medical assistants had to be more elastic, and their daily programme was subject to all manner of unexpected variations both inside and outside the hospital. Actual out-patient sessions were daily except Sunday, when only casualties were dealt with. In-patient rounds were three times a week, always in the afternoon, plus a quick round on Sunday morning to make sure nothing was going by default when most of the staff were off duty. (...) At 8 o'clock, after staff prayers, I would start to walk all round the rows of seated patients, sorting them out as I went. In this way every new patient could see the doctor, the old cases being left to an assistant unless I wished to see them again. (...) On operating days, normally twice a week, I had to delegate the screening of patients to a Medical Assistant, but he would recall any doubtful cases for me on a subsequent day. (...) With regard to the in-patients not only did I make a point of seeing every patient on admission and three times a week, but insisted that something, either investigation or treatment, must be done for every patient every day.

— Leader Stirling, Africa: My Surgery

=== Surgical ===
As a medical missionary Leader Stirling performed several different types of surgeries. Trauma surgeries were very common to repair blade wounds, in cases of violent attack or "not from fighting but from carelessness", since local culture would allow children to play with knives and people had the custom to carry those weapons on top of their loincloths. Besides those cases, beast attacks were a recurrent happening, with crocodiles, "lion, leopards, hippopotamus, wild boar, buffalo, baboon, hyena, and even the little bushbuck." being the perpetrators. He would also correct difficult fractures and poliomyelitis deformities using orthopaedic techniques.

Plastic surgeries were frequent for chronic ulcers, burns, hare-lip, vesico-vaginal fistula, trachoma, various scars and most importantly elephantiasis, to which he devised a new bloodless operation. He was also innovative in being one of the first to drain paraplegia-causing tuberculous abscesses. Removal of tumors and even teeth were also performed, along with hernia repairs.

He was also able to align local customs with modern medical norms in the case of circumcision surgeries, which were performed by untrained tribal leaders with little to no antiseptic precautions before his intervention.

To overcome the lack of proper infrastructure and equipments, Leader Stirling made instruments out of simple materials: "screw-drivers made ideal supracondylar traction pins, sewing cotton became perfect ligatures. Thomas splints were contrived from bamboo, extension cord from plaited palm leaves with stones as traction weights. For intravenous infusions he used triple-distilled water, to which he added salt and glucose. When plaster of Paris ran out, he made his own from locally quarried gypsum."

Leader Stirling also noted local differences between the places he worked. While Mnero and Lulindi were geographically close, Kibosho had a very different climate and population. Hernia, hydrocele and elephantiasis "which for thirty years had been my daily surgical chore" were less common in Kibosho than in the south villages.

=== Clinical ===
Even though surgery was his speciality, Leader Stirling had to deal with all sorts of medical problems working as a single doctor. Indeed, he affirms that surgery was a small part of his work. Tropical disease would in fact take most of his time. Examples of those are malaria (the most common), yaws, bilharzia, hookworm infestation, leprosy, and ulcers of the leg (acute or chronic) "the biggest constant problem".

Besides tropical diseases he also dealt with pneumonia, meningitis, septic infections, measles, whooping cough and even cancer.

Once again there were geographical differences in the occurrence of diseases. Kibosho had more worms, stomach trouble, high blood pressure and rheumatic fever while having less of bilharzia and leprosy relative to the south villages of Lulindi and Mnero.

== Nurse training ==
Soon after his arrival in Africa, Leader Stirling saw the need and opportunity for nurse training in Tanzania. In 1935 there would be usually only one doctor and one to two nurses per hospital, all imported, except on the big centres. There were already 4 schools in the country to train "dispensers", now called medical assistants, but no nursing schools. The challenge to training nurses was that local school heads would hold onto their brightest students, encouraging them to go into teacher-training, under the impression that teaching was the only honourable occupation for an African woman.

It was with the help of an experienced British nurse, Miss May Bell, that he started a nursing school in Lulindi, which was in later years transferred to Masasi and was still running in 1987, when he published the book. Mrs. Thekla Mchauru was the first woman to complete the course, qualifying in 1940 and becoming a registered nurse, the first Tanganyikan woman to do so. Miss May Bell and Leader Stirling's syllabus, based on the British model, was later adopted by the government and implemented all over the country's nursing schools.

At Mnero Leader Stirling also got involved in nurse training. Soon after the Mnero Hospital was built in the early 1950s, the Bishop gave him orders to start a new male nursing school. In 1959 they switched their training to Rural Medical Aids since there was a higher shortage of those professionals and, thus, became one of the only two Rural Medical Aids School in the country along with a governmental one.

== Scouting ==
Leader Stirling started his long career in Scouting at the age of 11. After some years off, he got back to it in medical school when he first assisted and then led one of the two troops of Toynbee Hall. He also started a new troop while working in private practice in South London.

In 1937 he helped Scout Commissioner George Tibbatts, also an English missionary, to establish the first Scout group in Southern Tanzania. However, since the Commissioner had to return to England after breaking his leg and this group was based 20 miles away, Leader Stirling discontinued the group. It was only in 1939 when Stirling was able to found his first Rover Scouts crew, based in Lulindi. After the success of this group he was invited to open another one in Luatala and with the growing interest in scouting in the region he eventually had to organise an informal Scoutmastership training event so as to train enough Scout Masters to lead troops. In 1941 the region had already around a dozen troops of Scouts and a district rally was promoted by Leader Stirling, which was attended by 124 out of the 132 scouts then registered. In 1947 the rally, now an annual event, attracted 300 scouts.

In 1948 he was appointed Commissioner for Training, spending the following 15 years training Scoutmasters for the whole country and in 1952 he ran his first Wood Badge course. Soon after the country's independence he was elected Chief Scout of Tanganyika, in 1962, and held this position for 10 more years.

He attended to the great Jubilee Jamboree of Scouting at Sutton Coldfield, England in 1957 with a group of 30 Tanzanians (Tanganyikans and Zanzibaris alike) where he met Queen Elizabeth II.

== Personal life ==
Leader Stirling became a Tanzanian citizen following the country's independence, in 1961. This was also required by his Parliamentary position and meant he had to relinquish his British citizenship, for Tanzania did not allow dual nationality.

Soon afterwards he married his first wife Regina Haule, an African nurse, in 1963, while living in Mnero. They moved to Kibosho in 1964 and a year later his mother paid the couple a visit, at the age of 88, her first visit to Africa. Unfortunately his wife died in 1972 of septicaemia when the couple was living in Soni.

Not long after widowing, Leader Stirling married his second wife Anna Chilunda, an African nurse trained by his nursing school in Lulindi, but also a widow Princess. He became the stepfather of her 6 children.

Leader Stirling was a devout and involved Catholic. Besides his missionary work, always linked to a religious institution and inspired by his faith, he founded and held the Chair of the Tanzania Christian Association and was also advisor to the Christian Social Services Commission. He also mentions meeting with the Pope.
