= Universities' Mission to Central Africa =

Former Anglo-Catholic missionary society

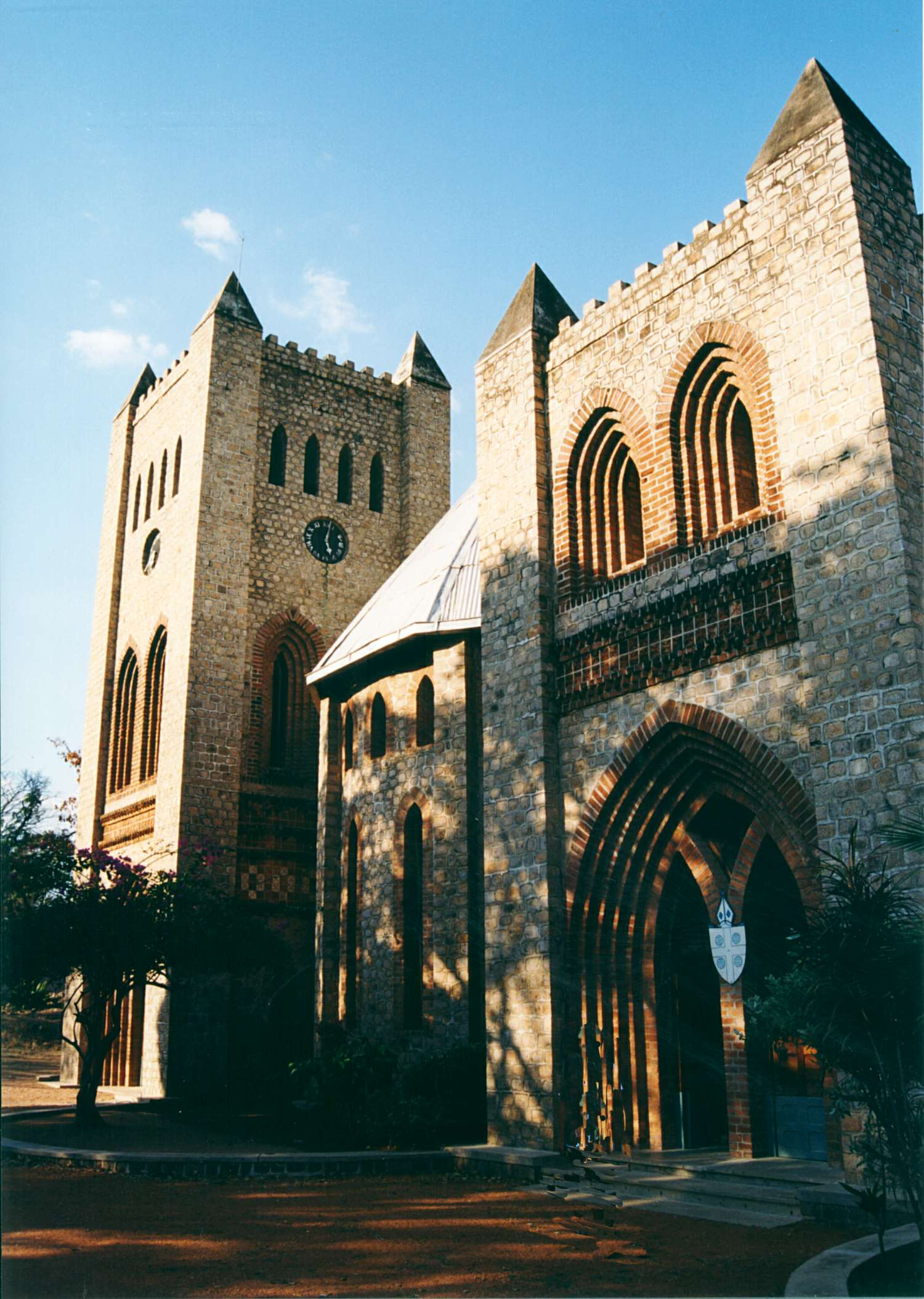
St Peter's Cathedral, Likoma, was built by the UMCA

The Universities' Mission to Central Africa (c.1857 - 1965) was a missionary society established by members of the Anglican Church within the universities of Oxford, Cambridge, Durham, and Dublin. It was firmly in the Anglo-Catholic tradition of the Church, and the first to devolve authority to a bishop in the field rather than to a home committee. Founded in response to a plea by David Livingstone, the society established the mission stations that grew to be the bishoprics of Zanzibar and Nyasaland (later Malawi), and pioneered the training of black African priests.

== Origins ==
The society's foundation was inspired by lectures that Livingstone gave on his return from Africa in 1857. Though named to reflect its university origins, from the outset it welcomed contributions from wellwishers unaffiliated to those institutions. The society had two major goals: to establish a mission presence in Central Africa, and to actively oppose the slave trade.

== First mission ==
To advance these goals, it sought to send a mission led by a bishop into Central Africa; Charles Mackenzie was duly consecrated in 1860 and led an expedition in 1861 up the Zambezi into the Shire Highlands. This first expedition was more or less disastrous. The area chosen as a base, near Lake Nyasa (Lake Malawi), proved highly malarial; Bishop Mackenzie died there of the disease on 31 January 1862, along with many local people and three others among the tiny missionary party. Early conversion efforts from this base yielded little result, and supplies ran out or were destroyed during a period of famine. The mission then withdrew from the area, abandoning the graves of the missionaries who had died there, and, though it established a new presence in Zanzibar, many years passed before it returned to Malawi. Bishop Tozer, Mackenzie's successor, deemed the mission's early years "a miserable failure".

== Zanzibar mission ==
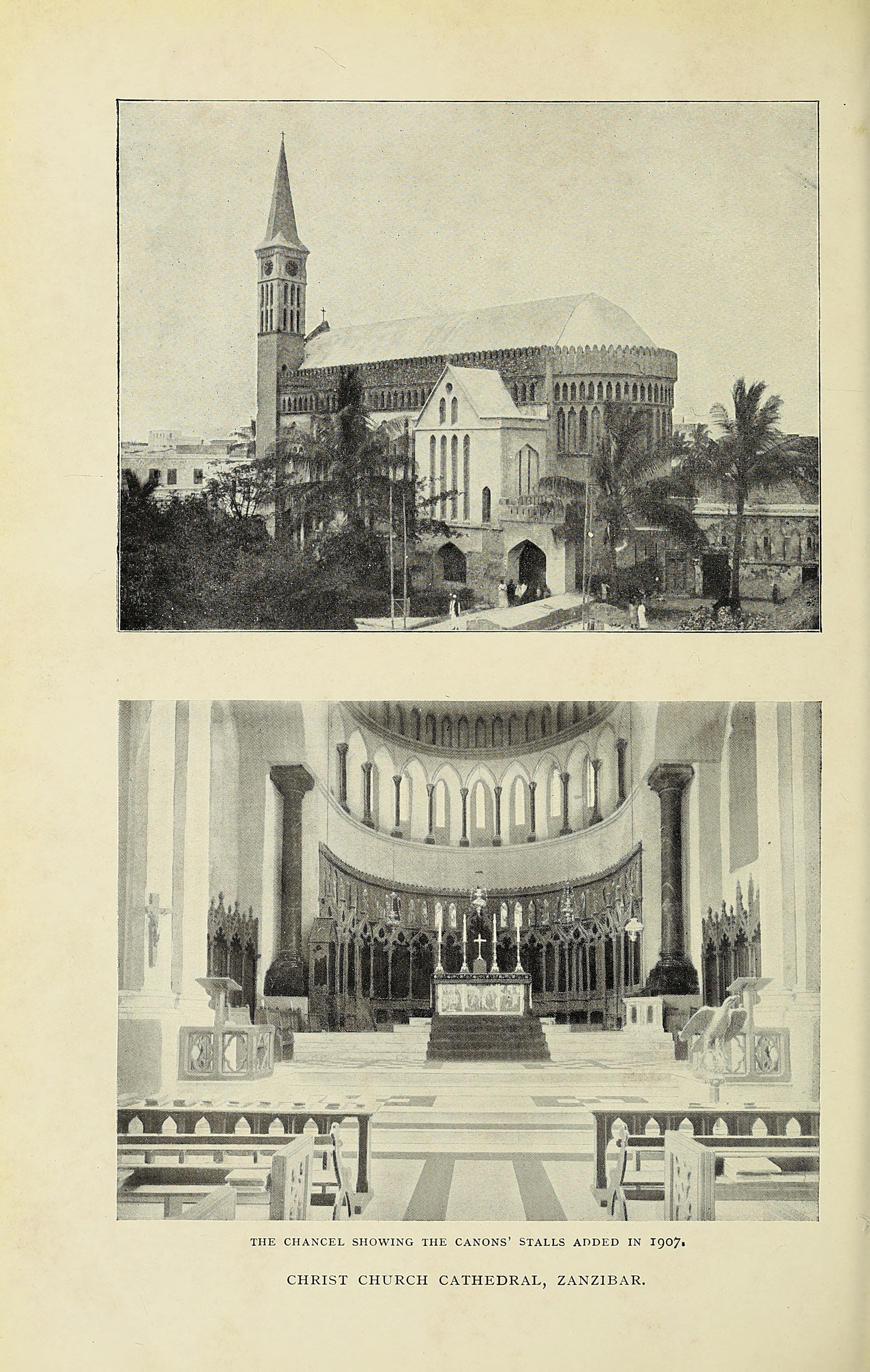
Christ Church Cathedral Zanzibar

Mackenzie's successor, Bishop Tozer, relocated the society's base to Zanzibar in 1864. Here they enjoyed much greater success, receiving a cordial welcome from the island's Arab and African residents, and establishing a number of operations, including a mission school, St Andrew's at Kiungani. The mission's early work in Zanzibar substantially involved caring for and schooling children rescued from slavery, and establishing a settlement - Mbweni, founded 1871 - for these released slaves to live in. On Christmas Day, 1873, the foundation stone of Christ Church was laid in the grounds of the former slave market, closed only six months earlier. It was completed in time for Christmas 1880 and a mass celebrated there. Miss Annie Allen came to the Zanzibar Mission in 1878 and later came to consider it home. Here she created a Zenana Mission that served many women and children.

== Expansion ==
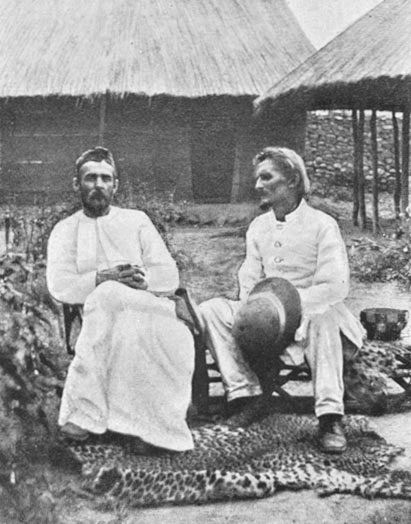
Chauncy Maples and William Percival Johnson, missionaries with UMCA

In 1874, Tozer was succeeded as bishop by Edward Steere, who pursued the mission's aim of returning to establish a presence at Lake Nyasa. Rather than attempting the arduous river navigation that had doomed the first mission, they set out for Lake Malawi this time overland, developing a network of mission stations toward the lake. Prominent among these were the stations at Magila and Masasi: Magila had been chosen after an initial site the mission had sought at Vuga, the capital of the Kilindi kingdom, was ruled out by the suspicious Kilindi chief. The site for the mission village at Masasi was reportedly chosen by African converts whom the missionaries were attempting to lead back to the homes from which they had been captured by slavers: though sure that the site was not their original home, they said it resembled it enough to settle. Via these routes, two missionaries, Charles Janson and William Percival Johnson, first reached the lake in 1884; Janson died there, but he lent his name to a ship the UMCA commissioned for use in ministering around the lake. which Steere's successor, Charles Alan Smythies, was able to use to travel widely through Africa on mission work. He oversaw the establishment on Likoma Island, in the lake, of a mission station, and then of an entire new diocese with its own bishop and its own cathedral, St Peter's, is still standing in the 21st century.

Another of Smythies's commitments was to the principle that Africa be converted and ministered by African priests, and he made many improvements to the arrangements for their teaching at Kiungani, ordaining the first local African priests. The first of these was Cecil Majaliwa, who worked at Chitangali in the Ruvuma Mission for eleven years, and made many converts. Smythies considered making Majaliwa bishop of the Ruvuma district, but his successors William Moore Richardson and John Edward Hine let the idea die. Although Hine was willing to raise African clergy to the rank of archdeacon, when he left this was abandoned too, and the highest rank any African reached in the UMCA missions before independence in 1961 was that of honorary canon. However, Majaliwa's grandson John Ramadhani became a bishop 1980 and the third African Archbishop of the Anglican Church of Tanzania in 1984. John Ramadhani's nephew Augustino Ramadhani, became Chief Justice of Tanzania from 2007 to 2010.

The organisation continued to work out of its bases on Zanzibar, Likoma, and on the Tanzanian mainland until 1910, when it commenced work also in Northern Rhodesia (now Zambia). It then pursued missionary work in these four areas throughout the first half of the twentieth century, offering medical provision and education as well as religious instruction and services. It played a prominent role in twentieth-century church history, with bishops including Frank Weston and John Edward Hine. Other notable Europeans among its staff included the novelist Robert Keable, and bishop Chauncy Maples, who joined the UMCA as an archdeacon and became the second Bishop of Likoma before drowning on the lake. The UMCA later commissioned a boat that bore his name, as they had with Charles Janson before. SS Chauncy Maples, built in 1899, is believed to be the oldest ship in Africa.

== Legacy ==
The society's centenary fell amid a context of decolonisation, and at a time when the UMCA was increasingly collaborating with the Society for the Propagation of the Gospel in Foreign Parts. The two organizations merged in 1965. The combined organisation celebrated the UMCA's 150th anniversary by emphasising the continuing importance of global fellowship and mission for its members.

Postcolonial historians' analyses of the UMCA have both praised its efforts to raise European humanitarian concern about slavery in East Africa and criticised the paternalistic attitudes toward Africans it continued to perpetuate, especially early in its history.

== See also ==
- Anglican Church of Tanzania
- Christianity in Malawi
- Chama Cha Mariamu Mtakatifu
