= 61-89 Jessie Street, Sentinel Works =

Former factory in Scotland

Coordinates: 55°50′07″N 4°14′32″W

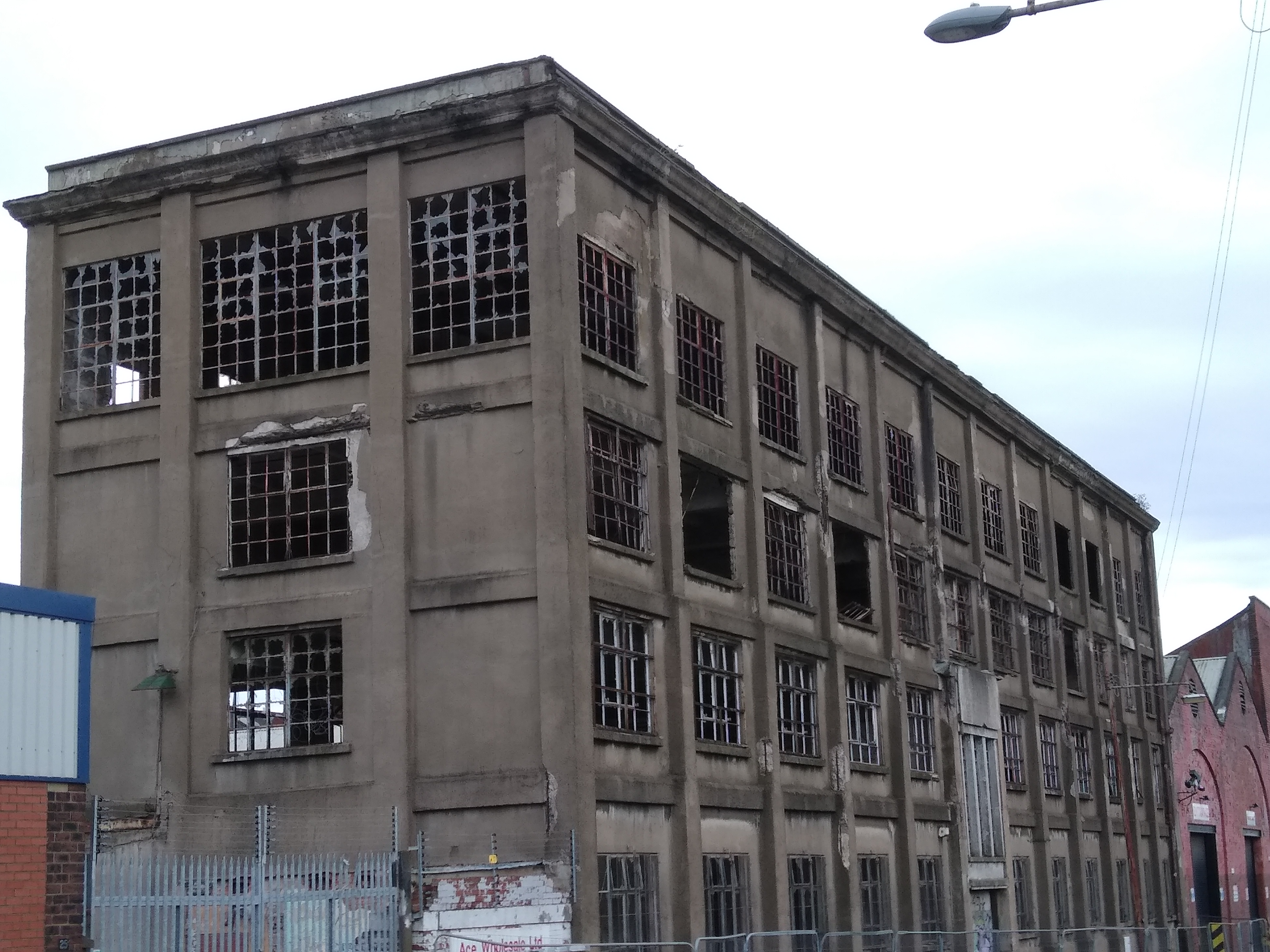
Sentinel Works in 2021

The Sentinel Works is a former factory building in Polmadie, Glasgow, Scotland. In 1991 the building was included in the Scottish Listed Buildings in the highest category A.

== History ==
The factory was built in 1904 for the Alley & MacLellan. The Sentinel was developed at this site and was later manufactured in the English factories of the Sentinel Waggon Works. The Sentinel Works had its own foundry and was mainly used to produce ships for inland waters. Around 500 ships were manufactured there as kits and assembled at their destination. Between 1918 and 1937 the factory belonged to Beardmores and was bought by the Weir Group in 1960.

In 1993 an application for demolition was rejected. This was in connection with the relocation of a railway depot as part of the extension of the M74. At this point, the factory had already been unused for an unknown period of time. Over the following decades, the condition of the building deteriorated noticeably. All of the glazing is now missing and some of the concrete in the damp masonry is chipping away. In 1994, the Sentinel Works were added to the Buildings at Risk Register for Scotland. In 2014, its condition was classified as very poor and at high risk.

== Description ==
The Sentinel Works is located in an industrial area in Glasgow's southeast. During construction, the innovative reinforced concrete construction method according to François Hennebique was used. Today it is the third oldest surviving reinforced concrete building in the United Kingdom. The flat roof construction anticipates the daylight-flooded American-style production facilities that would later also appear in England. The designer Archibald Leitch is responsible for planning and construction in collaboration with the Brand & Lithgow architectural firm. The south-facing front façade of the four-story building on Jessie Street is twelve bays wide; the side facades are three bays wide.
