= Chauncy Maples =

Anglican missionary

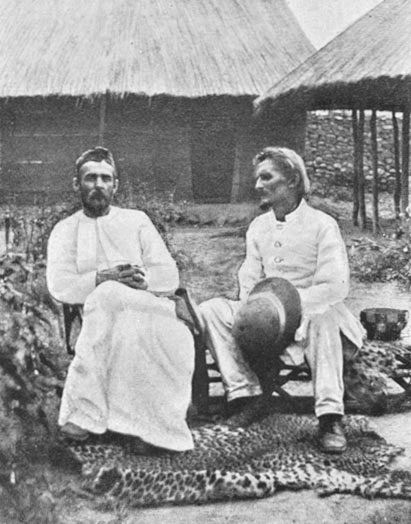
Maples (as archdeacon, on the left) with fellow missionary William Percival Johnson in 1895

Chauncy Maples (1852 – 2 September 1895) was a British clergyman and Anglican missionary who became Bishop of Likoma, with a diocese in East Africa.

== Early life ==
Born at Bound's Green in 1852, he was the son of Frederick Maples, a solicitor, and his wife Charlotte Elizabeth Chauncy. He was educated at Eagle House School and Charterhouse School. Coached by James Bowling Mozley, he entered the University of Oxford at the second attempt.

Maples matriculated in 1871 at University College, Oxford. In early 1874, suffering some poor health, he dropped out of his course for a time, and read with William Wolfe Capes at Liphook. In 1874 also, he encountered Edward Steere; he associated with Steere in late 1874 and early 1875, and became interested the Universities' Mission to Central Africa (UMCA). He graduated B.A. in 1875, and M.A. in 1879.

After graduation he worked in Liverpool with John Eyre. He was ordained deacon, and had a curacy at St Mary Magdalen's Church, Oxford.

== African missionary ==
In 1876 Maples sailed for Zanzibar for UCMA. He was ordained priest by Steere at Kiungani in September of that year. There he set up clinics and schools for formerly enslaved people. In 1877 he was transferred to Masasi, on the African mainland.

The Masasi mission did not thrive under Maples. Steere promoted Charles Janson over him in 1881, after a sex scandal involving a woman in Maples' household. In a complex local situation, Maples supported Matola I of the Yao people, who was on good terms with the Anglican missionaries. In 1882 Steere died on Zanzibar, and Janson died on an inland mission with William Percival Johnson to reach the east side of Lake Nyasa. The Masasi mission was destroyed by a raid that year, by Ngoni people.

Maples moved east to Newala. Charles Smythies in 1886 transferred Maples to the Anglican mission on Likoma Island, as Archdeacon of Nyasa.

== Bishopric and death ==
In 1895 Maples received recognition, as missionary and promoter of the UMCA. He was consecrated as Bishop of Likoma, in St Paul's Cathedral, on 29 June 1895. His predecessor Wilfrid Hornby was by title Bishop of Nyasaland. On his return journey, his boat capsized on Lake Nyasa during a storm on 2 September; Maples and the lay missionary Joseph Williams were drowned. The 18 African men and boys aboard swam safely ashore, but Maples was pulled down by the weight of his cassock.

== Legacy ==
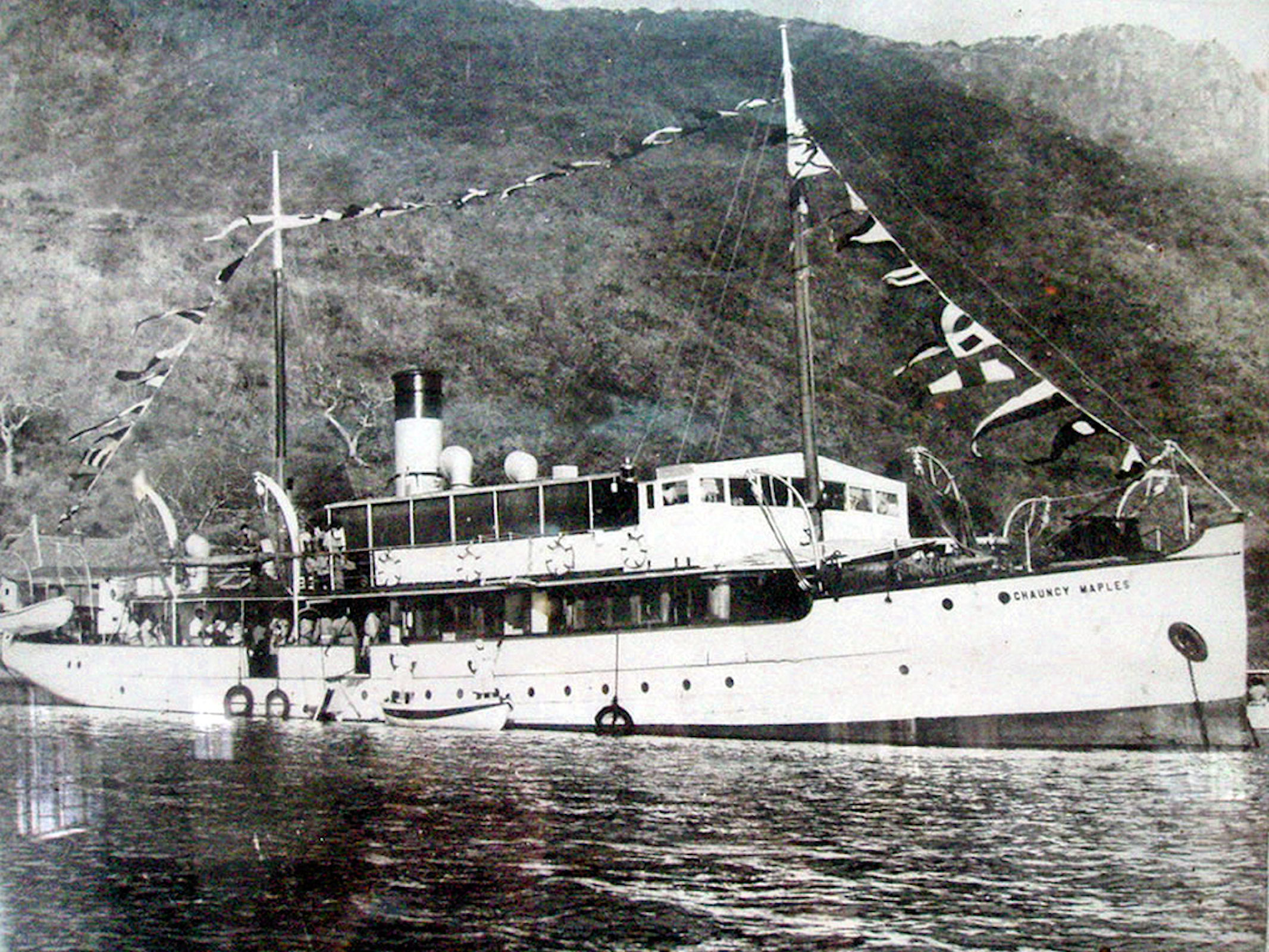
SS Chauncy Maples, 1952 photograph

In recognition of his role in East Africa, in 1901 the ship SS Chauncy Maples, the first steamship on Lake Nyasa (now Lake Malawi), was named after Maples. The ship continues to serve as a floating hospital.
