= Polmadie =

Area of Glasgow, Scotland

Coordinates: 55.835°N 4.244°W

Polmadie: Scottish Gaelic: Poll Mac Dè
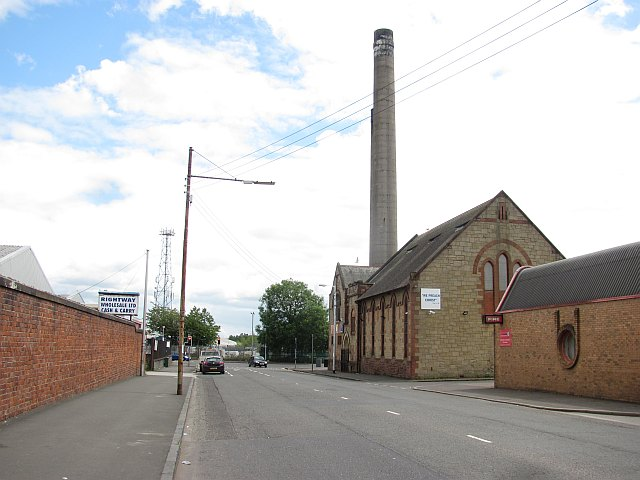
- 2011 image of Calder Street in Polmadie showing fire station and church (right) and incinerator chimneys, since demolished

- Location within Glasgow
- OS grid reference: NS595625
- Council area: Glasgow City Council
- Lieutenancy area: Glasgow
- Country: Scotland
- Sovereign state: United Kingdom
- Post town: GLASGOW
- Postcode district: G42
- Dialling code: 0141
- Police: Scotland
- Fire: Scottish
- Ambulance: Scottish
- UK Parliament: Glasgow Central
- Scottish Parliament: Glasgow Southside

Polmadie (/ˌpɒlməˈdiː/; Scottish Gaelic: Poll Mac Dè, lit. 'Son of God pool') is a primarily industrial area of Glasgow in Scotland. Situated south of the River Clyde, Polmadie is close to residential neighbourhoods including Govanhill (to the west) and Toryglen (south-east), with Oatlands and another large industrial zone at Shawfield to the north on the opposite side of major railway lines and the M74 motorway, Junction 1A of which serves the area.

For over 50 years, the most prominent landmarks within Polmadie were the 66-metre-high (217 ft) twin chimneys of a now disused waste incinerator plant operated by Glasgow City Council. This was replaced by a 'Recycling and Renewable Energy Centre' on the same site operated by Viridor with a less conspicuous stack.

Also located in the area is Alstom's Polmadie Depot, a large railway maintenance facility for Avanti West Coast which is the most northerly train stabling and maintenance area on the West Coast Main Line (WCML), since the line runs through Polmadie on its final approach into Glasgow Central station.

The area was also home to BOC's industrial gases filling plant and main Scottish base, until this moved to a more modern facility in early 2007 in Cambuslang just outside Glasgow in anticipation of the completion of the M74 Southern link and associated redevelopment of the surrounding area.

== History ==
=== Origin and meaning of the name ===
Polmadie is derived from the Scottish Gaelic Poll Mac Dè. Most place-names of the neighbourhoods of Glasgow were either coined by Gaelic-speakers or adapted to Gaelic from Cumbric. Polmadie is an early Gaelic name, containing the Gaelic "poll" (pool), but which usually means burn or stream in areas where Gaelic replaced Cumbric. From a late 12th century form, Polmacde, it is clear that the middle element is Gaelic mac (of (the) sons). The third element could be either the personal name Daigh, or the Gaelic Dè (of God), referring to an early religious establishment beside the burn. A remarkable feature of this place-name is how the original stress-pattern has survived, even centuries after its meaning ceased to be understood by those using it locally. It is still pronounced "pawmaDEE" (with a half stress on "paw" and full stress on "dee"), exactly as it would have been stressed in Gaelic.

=== Early modern period ===
During The Killing Time of politico-religious conflict, a group of soldiers commanded by a Major Balfour arrived at Polmadie Mill on 11 May 1685 and seized 2 weavers, Thomas Cooke and John Urie, and a labourer, Robert Thom, then shot them in a summary execution, and imprisoned the other men from the Mill. The three Polmadie Martyrs' bodies were buried in Cathcart Old Church graveyard where there is a memorial.

=== Shipbuilding ===
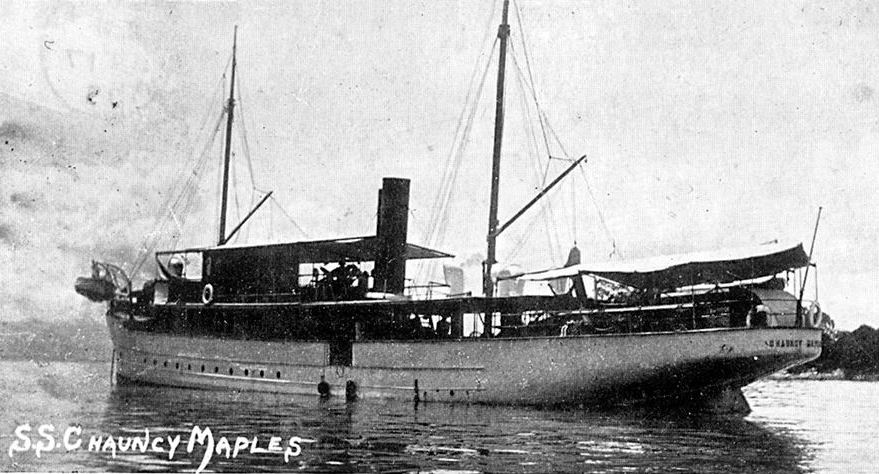
The SS Chauncy Maples at anchor on Lake Nyasa, four years after her launch

The Glasgow firm of Alley & MacLellan was a significant producer of smaller commercial vessels as well as the world's leading manufacturer of steam lorries (later Sentinel Waggon Works of Shrewsbury). Their building at Polmadie, designed by Archibald Leitch, is Category A listed due to its significance as the first steel-reinforced concrete building in Scotland, but was unoccupied and dilapidated as of the 2020s.

The yard had been built a considerable distance to the south of the river, with the final approach into Glasgow Central Station imposing just one of many barriers between it and the Clyde. The company specialised in supporting the far reaches of the British Empire by constructing vessels that were dismantled into kit form once they had been completed. The resulting set of parts was frequently enormous and a logistical nightmare to transport; re-assembly also depended heavily upon the availability of skilled hands at the customer's premises. As in the case of the SS Chauncy Maples, this was frequently the only viable option when the ultimate destination was very far inland.

== Sources on-line ==
- New Statistical Account of Scotland. 1845.
- "List of Charters referring to Polmadie Hospital" (PDF).
