= MV Chauncy Maples =

Motor ship and former steamship

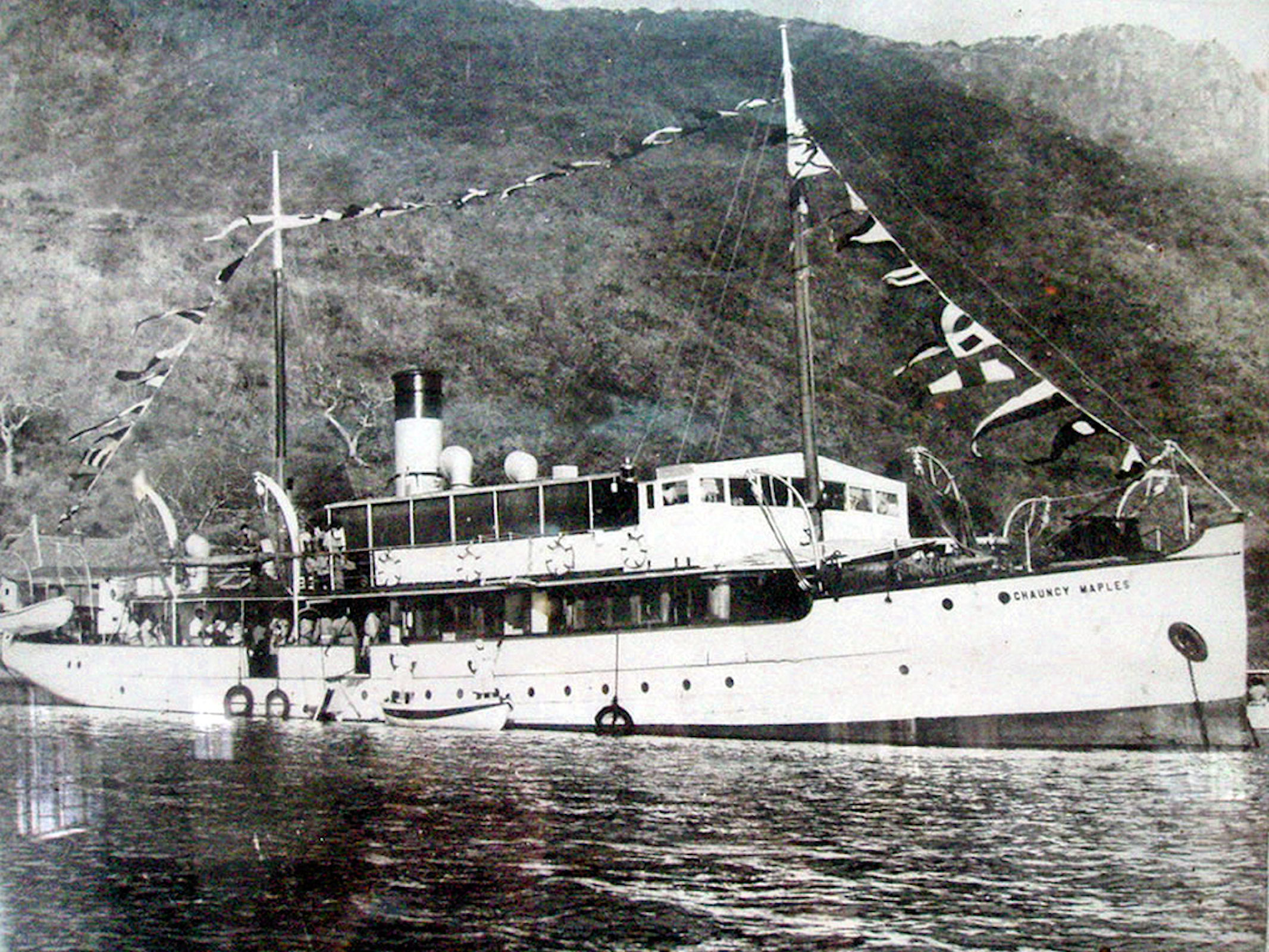
- The SS Chauncy Maples, decorated with festoons and carrying dignitaries, celebrates fifty years of service on Lake Nyasa.

History

Nyasaland, Malawi
- Name: SS Chauncy Maples (until 1967), MV Chauncy Maples (1967–present)
- Owner: Universities’ Mission to Central Africa (until 1953); Government of Malawi (1953 onwards)
- Operator: Universities' Mission to Central Africa (until 1953); Government of Malawi (1953–67); Malawi Railways (1967–92)
- Port of registry: Monkey Bay
- Ordered: 1898
- Builder: Alley & McClellan, Polmadie, Scotland
- Cost: £13,500
- Launched: 1901
- Maiden voyage: 1901
- In service: 1901
- Out of service: 1992
- Fate: Laid up

General characteristics
- Tonnage: 150 tons
- Displacement: 250 tons
- Length: 38 m (126 ft)
- Beam: 6.1 m (20 ft)
- Draught: 2.0 m (6 1/2 ft)
- Installed power: Steam engine (until 1967), 330 BHP 6-cylinder Crossley diesel engine (1967 onwards)
- Propulsion: Single screw propeller
- Crew: 10 (as motor vessel)

MV Chauncy Maples is a motor ship and former steamship that was launched in 1901 as SS Chauncy Maples. She spent her entire career on Lake Malawi (formerly more widely known as Lake Nyasa) and was regarded as the oldest ship afloat in Africa. After more than one hundred years' service it was intended to restore her for use as a floating medical clinic to support the several million lakeshore dwellers whose average life expectancy is 44 years. The Government of Malawi offered support for this in 2009 and charity fundraising was sufficient to make progress. The hull was found to be beyond repair at a viable cost so a more practical modern craft was proposed to give ambulance service around the lake.

== Shipbuilders Alley & McLellan, Polmadie ==
The Alley & McLellan shipyard in Polmadie, Glasgow, was a considerable distance from the River Clyde, with the final approach into Glasgow Central Station posing just one of many barriers between it and the Clyde. The company specialised in supporting the far reaches of the British Empire by building vessels that were dismantled into kit form once they had been completed.

The resulting set of parts was frequently enormous and a daunting logistical task to transport. Re-assembly also depended heavily upon the availability of skilled labour at the customer's premises. As in the case of the Chauncy Maples, this was frequently the only viable option when the ultimate destination was very far inland, away from any semblance of modern communications.

== Purpose and delivery ==
The SS Chauncy Maples was designed to steam the extensive waters of Lake Nyasa, the most southerly lake in East Africa. At 560 kilometres (350 mi) long and 80 km (50 mi) wide it is the eighth-largest lake in the world. It is also the second-deepest lake in Africa and home to more fish species than any other lake on Earth, giving an easy source of food for those who live around its shores.

Conceived and commissioned by the Universities' Mission to Central Africa (UMCA), the 150-ton ship was one of the last designs produced by Henry Marc Brunel, son of the Victorian engineer Isambard Kingdom Brunel. Once dismantled, the complex kit of almost 3,481 parts was transported by cargo ship to Portuguese East Africa, then towed by barge up the dangerous waters of the Zambezi.

The boiler was built by Abbott of Newark. It weighed 11 tons and was transported in one piece on a special wagon fitted with Sentinel wheels, to be hauled overland by 450 Ngoni tribesmen for 560 km (350 mi) through uncharted malarial land to the East African Rift. The other parts of the ship were man-handled or carried on the heads of men and women over difficult terrain and across river beds: they averaged only 5 km (3 mi) a day.

== David Livingstone ==
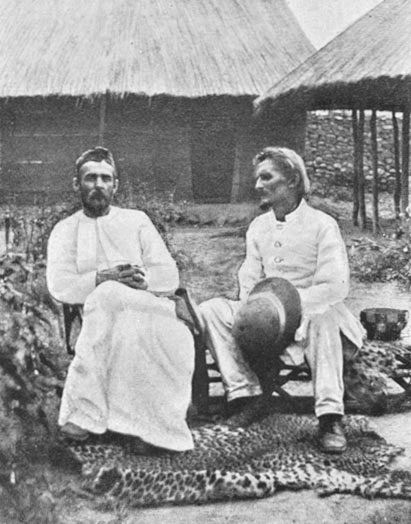
Archdeacon Chauncy Maples (left) with fellow missionary Rev. W.P. Johnson in 1895

David Livingstone, the first European to reach the lake and an evangelist for steamboat missions, had made much quicker progress in 1859, claiming much of the area surrounding the lake as part of the British Empire, forming the colony of Nyasaland. Although Portugal took control of the eastern shores of the lake, the islands of Likoma and Chizumulu were colonised by Scottish missionaries and, as a result, became part of Nyasaland rather than Portuguese East Africa (now Mozambique).

== Reassembly ==
Re-assembly of the Chauncy Maples proved to be even more arduous than the journey—in error, the part numbers had been stamped on each section prior to the galvanising process, making the task for the African engineers even more complex. It took two years to re-assemble; the vessel was finally launched on 6 June 1901 and named after Bishop Chauncy Maples, an Anglican missionary, later Bishop of Nyasaland. In 1895, while on the way to take up his duties, his boat capsized during a storm on Lake Nyasa and he drowned because of the weight of his cassock.

== Hospital ship, missionary school and the extinction of the slave trade ==
Missionaries brought to Africa far more than religion and the UMCA had a very clear vision for their £9,000 investment. The ship had three overt tasks—to give the lake a hospital ship, a missionary school and an emergency refuge from Arab slave traders. In reality, the goals were of more global importance; as one of the mission's founding supporters, the Bishop of Oxford, Samuel Wilberforce, had made clear, the prime task was "the work of civilising commerce, the extinction of the slave-trade and, if possible, the colonisation of Africa".

Lake Nyasa was a long way from the sea, and initial progress with medical provision at Likoma was erratic. The programme had been introduced in 1894, during the brief stay of a UMCA physician. His replacement was the Rev John Edward Hine, who although also a medical doctor was ultimately little interested in this aspect of his duties. When Hine was appointed Bishop of Eastern Equatorial Africa in 1896 he chose to concentrate on spiritual rather than health-related matters.

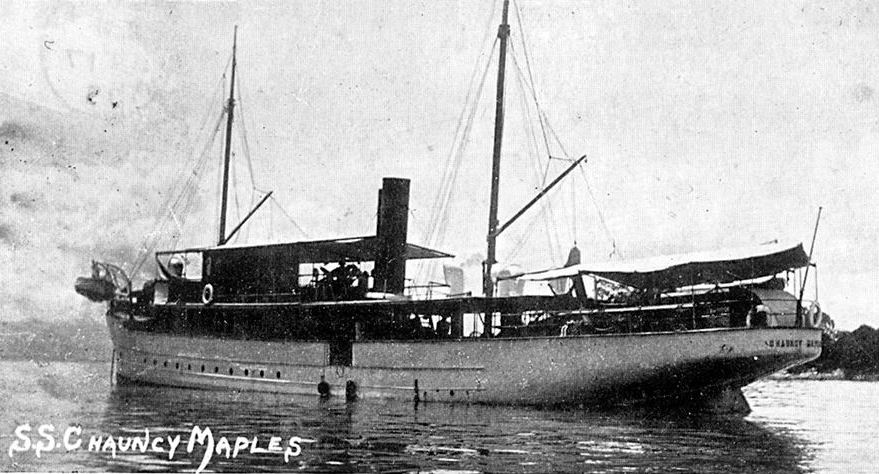
SS Chauncy Maples at anchor on Lake Nyasa four years after her launch

The arrival of the Chauncy Maples and Dr. Robert Howard produced a radical change in the level and quality of medical provision to the lakeside inhabitants. Howard quickly laid the foundation of a robust health system with the Chauncy Maples fulfilling a central role. By the 1930s many stations, including those on the periphery, had health clinics run by missionary nurses or by African assistants. With the advantage of details on local diseases gathered by other doctors in the area, mainly from the Scottish missions, Dr. Howard adopted an anti-malaria strategy, and in conjunction with colleagues at Blantyre mission, embarked on an anti-smallpox vaccination program.

For a poorly resourced mission, the cost of maintaining the steamer required a strong focus on local provisioning. With a draught permitting access to all areas of the lake, the ship was largely self-sustaining, her steam engine powered by wood scavenged from the shore areas. But the matter of slave raiding was more problematic, requiring not only manpower for site security, but also an appreciation of the uneasy boundaries that lay between the worlds of evangelism, medicine and trade. Finding appropriately qualified crew prepared to accept low pay and the tribulations of life on the lake was one thing; the mission's unyielding insistence on celibacy among its European staff was an even greater recruitment challenge. Behind all this lay the tensions arising from the mission's intentional policy of overextension of its mission surrounding Lake Nyasa. The Chauncy Maples operated in the contradictory world of an evangelical mission which offered desperately needed medical support to the poor in an environment of political instability and unfettered imperial capitalism.

Apart from a period of service during the First World War as a troop carrier and gunboat, the ship served the inhabitants of Nyasaland for half a century until 1953, when she was sold and converted into a trawler. In 1967 the Malawian government bought her, refitted her as a passenger and cargo ship and replaced her steam engine with a Crossley in-line diesel engine. Her steam engine is preserved in the Lake Malawi Museum at Mangochi. The ship is currently laid up at Monkey Bay.

== Controversies of European Christian missions ==
Although work in the field of health was conducted out of the conviction that western medicine was good for Africans, it was not an entirely altruistic programme. The missionaries were to reflect the emerging Victorian view of Africa and African peoples, that African thought and behaviour needed radical change if they were to be converted to western values. Like missionary work in other parts of Africa, it was viewed as a key means to prove the power and mystery of the Christian message.

In retrospect there is evidence of a lack of missionary sensitivity to many aspects of African culture, the injustices of early colonial land policies, the low priority given to theological education, and the slowness to ordain African clergy. But much as missionaries must be viewed as principally propagators of basic religion, their work in introducing ideas of western medicine and technology undoubtedly had a profound impact on the foundations of modern public health in the region. By 1965, churches provided around 45 per cent of all hospital beds in Malawi.

Some of the missionaries who spent time on the ship recognised the ironic nature of elements of their work. The Rev. George Wilson recorded in his diary:

"Wherever a European goes he seems to carry some subtle power of change; whether it be the government official, the missionary, the planter or the trader, each is working for change, whether he knows it or not. This is a matter of great anxiety to all who love Africans, for I cannot feel at all certain that this change must necessarily be for the better."

Most commentators would have accepted that radical change was now an urgent requirement, as was made clear by the Rev. Robert Keable in 1914, a missionary in Zanzibar:

"We walked into the partially walled compound or court representing the slave-market a bona fide affair, not like the caravanserai which used to be fitted up and furnished by the Cairene Dragoman for the inspection of curious tourists. A wooden cage, about twenty feet square, often contained some one hundred and fifty men, women, and children, who every day were 'knocked down' to the highest bidder in the public place."

The personal cost was high. In the gardens of St. Michael's church at Blantyre, the city named after Livingstone's birthplace in Scotland, is a memorial plaque to fourteen members of the Nyasaland Mission who died in the service of the Church of Scotland's African missions. The dates of death given on the plaque range from 1890 to 1919. A passage from the Gospel of Matthew reads: "He that loseth his life for my sake shall find it".

== Restoration ==
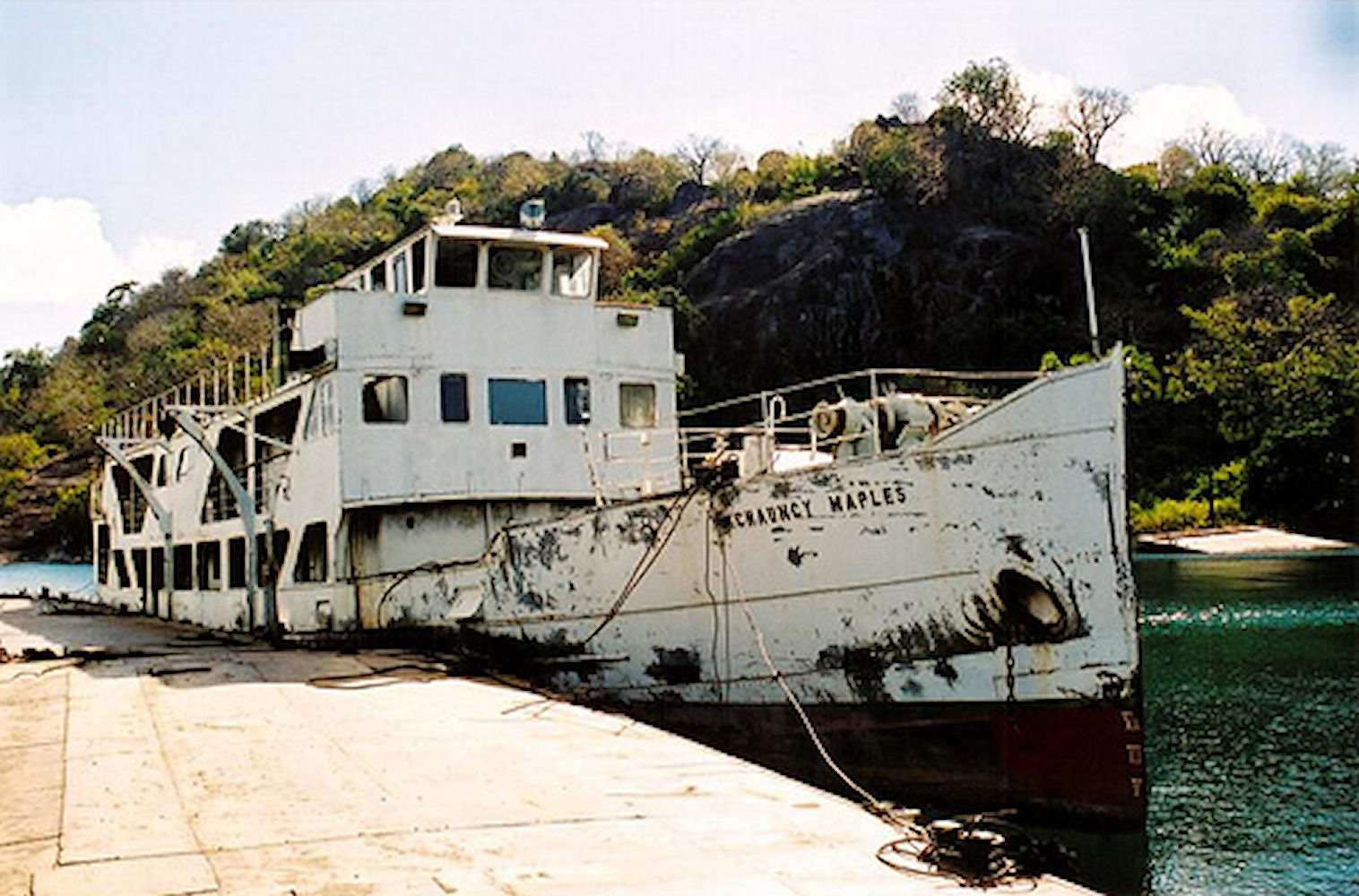
MV Chauncy Maples awaiting restoration in 2008. The current bridge is not original to the ship and will be removed to improve her stability and to return her to her original configuration.

The last formal inspection in 1992 revealed little damage to the riveted steel hull; although a single skin hull no longer complies with current regulations, she has been granted an exemption on the grounds of historical importance. The higher quality of steel produced in 1899 no doubt also played a part—after placing the vessel in a dry dock at Monkey Bay in May 2009, marine engineer Pieter Volschenk concluded that more recently constructed ships looked in worse condition after only twenty years at sea. In January 2012, she was brought ashore for the continuing restoration work.

The restoration is led by the Government of Malawi and supported by the Chauncy Maples Malawi Trust in Britain. It was expected that the vessel would return to the task for which she was conceived in late 2014. Once the Chauncy Maples had been restored to a floating clinic a medical team would provide support and treatment to people living around the shores of Lake Malawi. The country's lake dwellers currently have no access to health care services and face high rates of malaria, HIV-AIDS and tuberculosis. Life expectancy at birth is just under 53 years.

In 2017, the trust announced that the restoration had been abandoned.

"The Chauncy Maples Malawi Trust (CMMT) based in the UK together with Portuguese construction company, Mota-Engil, regret to announce that their joint project to renovate the 100-year-old missionary vessel, Chauncy Maples, to operate as a mobile clinic on Lake Malawi, will not be proceeding. As work has progressed on the vessel, unforeseen technical problems have come to light regarding the integrity of the hull, which mean that the costs of refurbishment have escalated beyond what can be regarded as economically viable—particularly noting that the object of the charity is delivery of healthcare and the vessel was only to be the means of delivery."
