= William Richardson (bishop) =

William Moore Richardson (1844 – 6 March 1915) was the Anglican Bishop of Zanzibar from 1895 until 1901.

He was born in 1844, educated at Rossall School and Merton College, Oxford and ordained in 1869. He held incumbencies at Wolvercote and Ponteland before his elevation to the episcopate. On his return from Africa he was Warden of the Community of St Thomas the Martyr in Oxford until his retirement in 1910. He died on 6 March 1915.

Church of England titles
Preceded by Charles Alan Smythies	Bishop of Zanzibar; 1895–1901	Succeeded by John Edward Hine
