= Archibald Leitch =

Scottish architect (1865–1939)

- Born: 27 April 1865; Glasgow, Scotland
- Died: 25 April 1939 (aged 73)
- Occupation: Architect
- Projects: Ayresome Park, Hillsborough Stadium, Bramall Lane, Goodison Park, Arsenal Stadium, Stamford Bridge, Celtic Park, Anfield, Craven Cottage, Molineux Stadium, Hampden Park, Roker Park, Old Trafford, Villa Park, Ibrox, White Hart Lane, Fratton Park, Valley Parade, Tynecastle Park (Heart of Midlothian), Leeds Road, Dens Park, Selhurst Park

Archibald Keir Leitch (27 April 1865 – 25 April 1939) was a Scottish architect, most famous for his work designing football stadiums throughout Great Britain and Ireland.

== Early work ==
Born in Glasgow, Leitch's early work was on designing tea factories in Deltota in the former Kandyan Kingdom of Ceylon, as well as factories in his home city and in Lanarkshire, the sole surviving example of which being the category A listed Sentinel Works at Jessie Street, Polmadie, south of Glasgow city centre. In 1896 he became a member of the Institution of Engineers and Shipbuilders in Scotland, and later of the Institution of Mechanical Engineers. He moved into stadium design when he was commissioned to build Ibrox Park, the new home ground of his boyhood heroes Rangers, in 1899.

== Stadium design ==
Leitch's stadiums were initially considered functional rather than aesthetically elegant, and were clearly influenced by his early work on industrial buildings. Typically, his stands had two tiers, with criss-crossed steel balustrades at the front of the upper tier, and were covered by a series of pitched roofs, built so that their ends faced onto the playing field; the central roof span would be distinctly larger, and would incorporate a distinctive pediment.

His first project in England was the design and building of the John Street Stand at Bramall Lane, which provided 3,000 seats and terracing for 6,000 and was dominated by a large mock-Tudor press box.

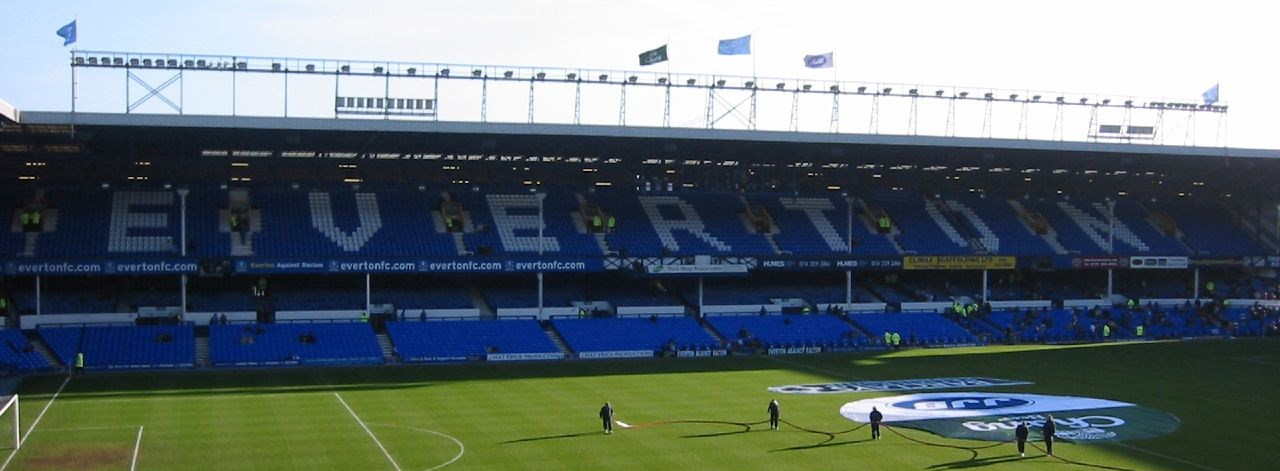
The double-decker 1926 Bullens Road Stand at Goodison Park, former home of Everton FC

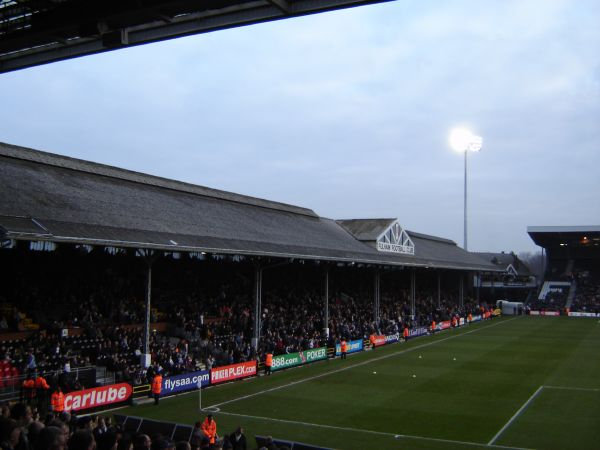
The Johnny Haynes stand at Craven Cottage, home of Fulham Football Club

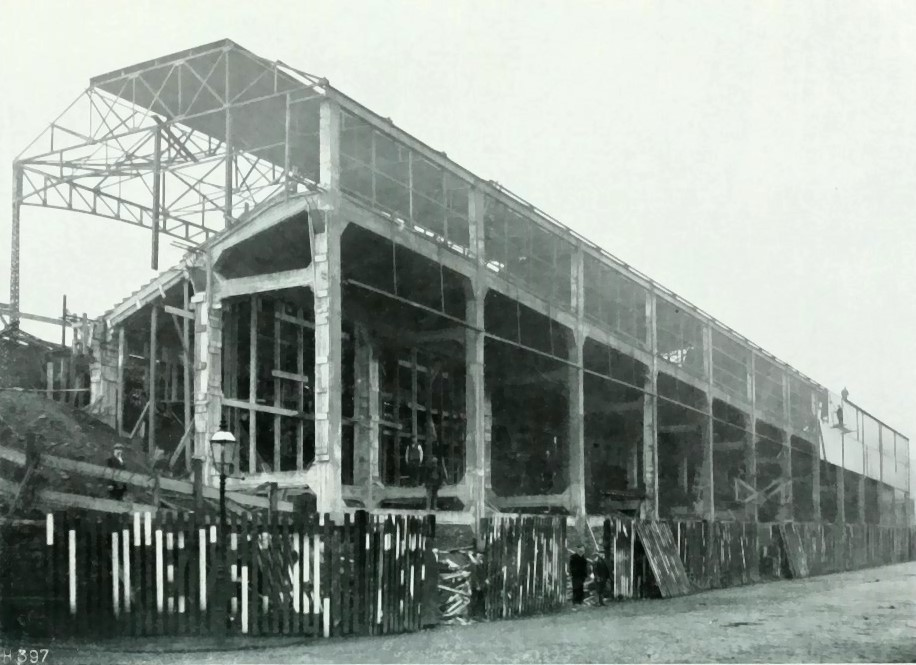
The concrete Midland Road stand for Bradford City Football Club nearing completion in 1908

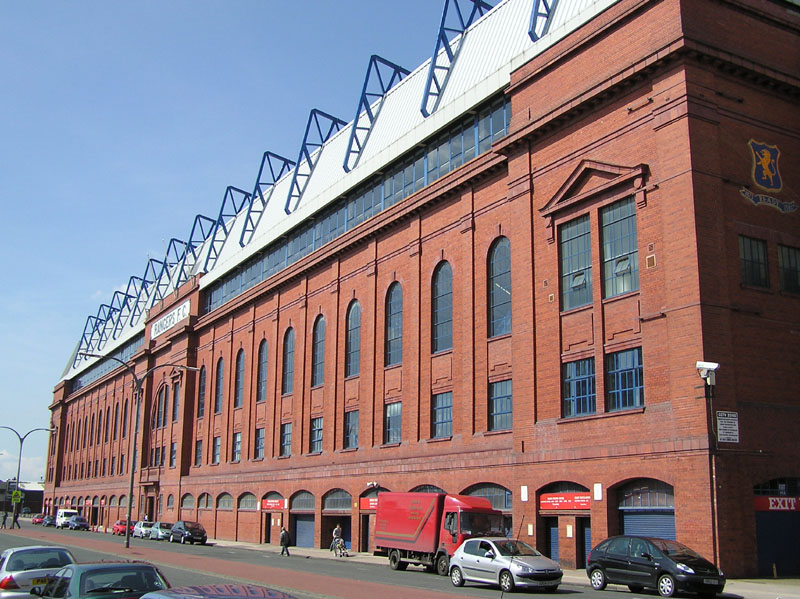
The Bill Struth Main Stand at Ibrox, home of Rangers Football Club

Leitch's reputation as an architect was damaged as a result of the Ibrox disaster of 1902, when 25 people were killed when a bank of wooden terracing collapsed due to substandard pine being used in the terraces. Leitch, in attendance at the disaster, convinced Rangers to hire him to build the replacement stand. Leitch patented a new form of strengthening terraces for the Ibrox rebuild. Over the next four decades he became Britain's foremost football architect. In total he was commissioned to design part or all of more than 20 stadiums in the UK and Ireland between 1899 and 1939, including:

- Anfield, Liverpool
- Arsenal Stadium, Highbury, London
- Ayresome Park, Middlesbrough
- Bramall Lane, Sheffield
- Cardiff Arms Park, Cardiff
- Celtic Park, Glasgow
- Craven Cottage, Fulham, London
- Dalymount Park, Dublin, Ireland
- Deepdale, Preston
- The Old Den, New Cross, London
- Dens Park, Dundee
- The Dell, Southampton
- Ewood Park, Blackburn
- Filbert Street, Leicester, the double-decker stand (The Kop).
- Fratton Park, Portsmouth
- Goodison Park, Liverpool
- Hampden Park, Glasgow
- Home Park, Plymouth
- Hyde Road Football Stadium, Manchester (General ground improvements 1911–1914 and a planned complete rebuild of the ground to accommodate 100,000; war broke out, bringing a halt to these plans)
- Ibrox Park, Glasgow
- Hillsborough Stadium, Sheffield
- Lansdowne Road, Dublin, Ireland
- Leeds Road, Huddersfield
- Molineux, Wolverhampton
- Oakwell, Barnsley
- Old Trafford, Trafford, Greater Manchester
- Park Avenue, Bradford
- Pittodrie Stadium, Aberdeen
- Roker Park, Sunderland
- Rugby Park, Kilmarnock
- Saltergate, Chesterfield
- Selhurst Park, South Norwood, London
- Somerset Park, Ayr
- Stamford Bridge, Fulham, London
- Stark's Park, Kirkcaldy
- Twickenham Stadium, Twickenham, London
- Tynecastle Park, Edinburgh
- Valley Parade, Bradford (Midland Road stand and other extensions)
- Villa Park, Birmingham
- West Ham Stadium, Custom House, Newham, London
- White Hart Lane, Tottenham, London
- Windsor Park, Belfast, Northern Ireland

Many of his works have since been demolished for redevelopment, especially in wake of the Taylor Report and the move to all-seater stadiums. For instance, the Trinity Road Stand at Villa Park, considered his masterpiece, was demolished in 2000. The Leitch-designed main stand at Heart of Midlothian's Tynecastle Park, the main stand and pavilion at Craven Cottage and the facade of the main stand at Ibrox, were prominent examples which have since been redeveloped and remodelled, removing original Leitch features. The Bullens Road and Gwladys Street stands at Goodison Park survive as listed buildings, with Everton relocating to the Everton Stadium but retaining Goodison for the women's team. They and the 100-year old South Stand at Fratton Park will be the last original Leitch-designed stand in England in use in its original form.
