= William Tozer =

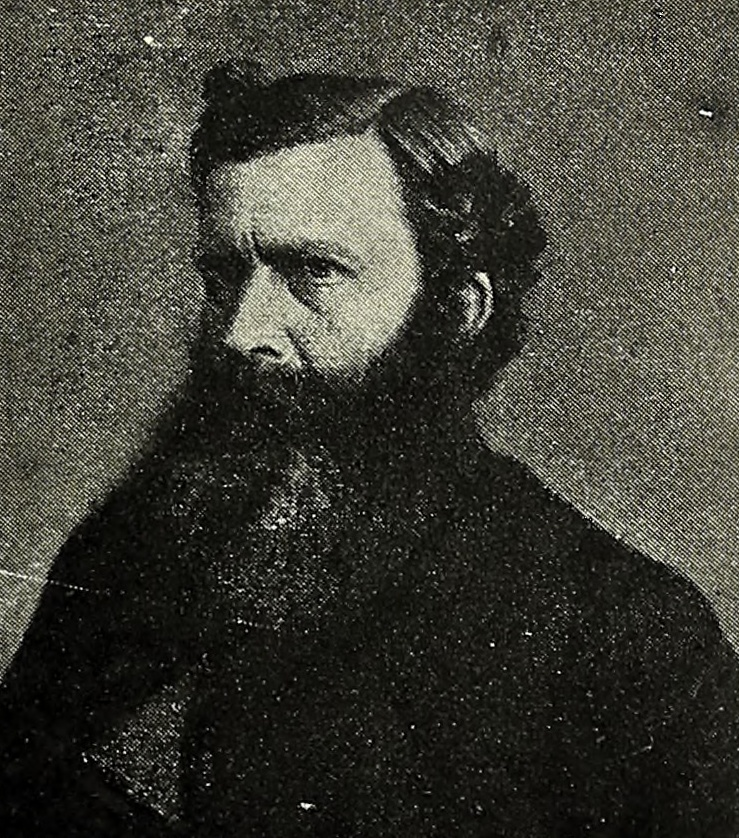
- Born: William George Tozer; 1829; Teignmouth
- Died: 23 June 1899 (aged 69–70)
- Occupation: colonial bishop
- Known for: Bishop in Central Africa and West Indies
- Notable work: leader of the Universities' Mission to Central Africa

William George Tozer (1829–1899) was a colonial bishop in the 19th century.

He was born in Teignmouth and educated at St John's College, Oxford and ordained in 1854. His first post was a curacy at St Mary Magdalene Munster Square. Later he was Vicar of Burgh-le-Marsh. In 1862 he was appointed leader of the Universities' Mission to Central Africa. He was a bishop in Central Africa for a decade and later held further Episcopal appointments in the West Indies. He died on 23 June 1899.

Church of England titles
Preceded by Charles Mackenzie	Bishop in Central Africa; 1863–1873	Succeeded by Edward Steere
Preceded by Reginald Courtenay	Bishop of Jamaica; 1879–1880	Succeeded by Enos Nuttall
New title	Bishop of Belize; 1880– 1881	Succeeded by Enos Nuttall
