= Deltota =

Coordinates: 7°10′N 80°42′E

- Village
- Interactive map of Deltota
- Country: Sri Lanka
- Province: Central Province
- Time zone: UTC+5:30 (Sri Lanka Standard Time)

Deltota is a village in Sri Lanka. It is located within Central Province, 32km south east of Kandy.

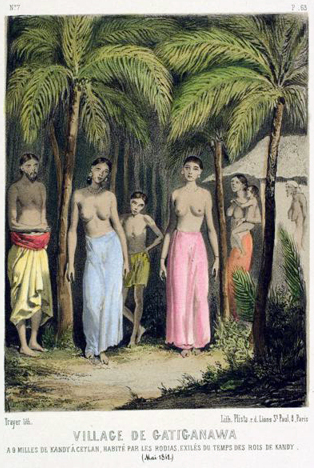
Village of Gatiganawa 9 miles from Kandy in Ceylon, inhabited by the Rodias, exiles from the time of the Kings of Kandy, 1841. Sketched by Prince Alexey Saltykov

== See also ==
- List of towns in Central Province, Sri Lanka
