= Annie Allen (missionary) =

English missionary active in Zanzibar

- Occupation: Medical missionary

Annie Allen was a Christian medical missionary from England. She worked in Zanzibar in the 1870s and 1880s.

== Overview ==
Allen was the daughter and granddaughter of missionaries. She worked primarily with the Universities' Mission to Central Africa (which later became the United Mission to Central Africa) in their hospitals at Mkunazini in Zanzibar.

The UMCA was an Anglo-Catholic organization. and their main goal was evangelism.

Allen was the director of the hospital in Mkunazini. Though she was mainly concerned with the health of the people she served, she also pushed for the education of the women and children of the areas where she worked. She founded the Zenana Mission in Zanzibar through the UMCA.

== Hospital Work ==
The UMCA was founded in 1860 at the request of David Livingston." It was originally a mission for the people around Lake Nyassa, but it quickly grew. The main goal of the mission was always evangelistic, but they also spent a lot of time bringing education and health care to the people of the region.

Allen worked on all three major aspects of this mission, but her primary focus was as a medical missionary. She came to Mkunazini with Bishop Steere and twenty other workers on 11 February 1875. Allen was put in charge of the hospital. She also accompanied the bishop on his trips to nearby villages to spread the gospel and would tend to the medical needs of the growing crowds.

She worked in Mkunazini for the next 10 years and faced a variety of difficulties, including flood and war. In August 1888 she, with Sister Agnes, Sister Anne Margaret, Sister Mary Elizabeth and Mr. Gill, journeyed to Maglia by donkey. They had been in Maglia less than a month the Great Fire of November 5, 1888 hit the mission. Many structures were lost including many houses and half of the newly built hospital. Allen was the only doctor in the village at the time and cared for all of the injured as well treating illness that resulted from the villagers living so close together during the rainy season.

On 6 January 1889, another fire ravaged the mission at Maglia. Six weeks later, on 18 February, a tornado hit the village and did substantial damage to the newly rebuilt hospital. On 27 February, the war between Kimweri and Kibanga came to Maglia when 400 Masai warriors descended upon the village. This war lasted until 7 March, when Archdeacon Farier made peace with Kimweri.

== Evangelistic work with women and children ==
Allen was also involved in many outreach programs with Zenana Missions. In 1878 she started one such mission in Zanzibar. She recruited Miss Hinton, and the two women used the mission to spread Christianity. Hinton helped run the Mission's nursery, believing that, "the nation comes from the nursery" where there can be "a firm foothold for Christianity." The two women spent a lot of time with the children of Zanzibar to ensure they had a proper Christian education.

Allen also visited the mothers to read Bible stories to them. She was especially successful in converting these Muslim women by pointing out the many similarities between their religion and the Genesis stories in the Christian Bible. She employed the same technique when she later worked with the Copts of Cairo. The Church Mission Society (CMS) was especially concerned with how superstitious the Copts had become. She was not as successful with converting this group.

Like many Zenana Missions, Allen's missions later became less evangelistic and more focused on educating women and young girls. She taught sewing and gave them the skills and materials necessary to mend their own clothes, thereby making them more self-sufficient.

In a letter detailing her 1906 trip to Yinege, Allen detailed some of the other skills and values they taught women. She remarked that she was impressed by their "lady like manner and neat dress." She also was very happy to report that the women seemed receptive toward Christianity. In all of her years as a Zenanan missionary, these were the characteristics she expected to see in women who were served by similar establishments.
