= William Percival Johnson =

Anglican missionary; translated the Bible into Chinyanja

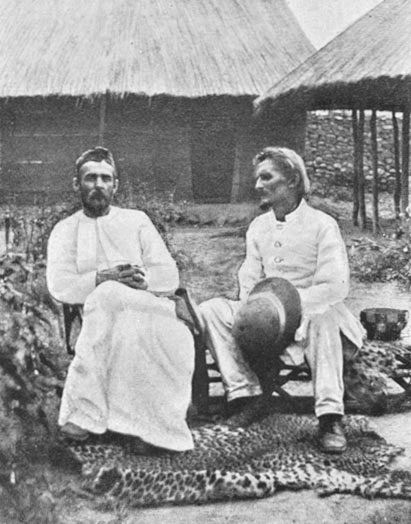
Archdeacon Chauncy Maples (left), and William Percival Johnson (right), 1895

William Percival Johnson (12 March 1854 in St Helens, Isle of Wight – October 1928 in Liuli, Tanganyika) was an Anglican missionary to Nyasaland. After education at Bedford School (1863–1873) and graduation from University College, Oxford, he went to Africa with the Universities' Mission to Central Africa, under the Bishop Edward Steere.

He translated the Bible into the Likoma Island dialect of Chinyanja, under the title Chikalakala choyera: ndicho Malangano ya Kale ndi Malangano ya Chapano which was published in 1912. Together with another Universities' Mission missionary, Arthur Glossop (1867-1949), he also translated the Book of Common Prayer into Chinyanja (1897, revised 1909).

Johnson also published two other books: Nyasa, the Great Water, being a Description of the Lake and the Life of the People (Oxford University Press, 1922) and My African Reminiscences, 1875-1895 (London: Universities Mission to Central Africa, 1925).

He died at Liuli, Mbinga District, on the shores of what is today the Tanzanian side of Lake Malawi in 1928, the site of the largest mission in the Ruvuma region of Tanzania. He is regarded locally as a saint and there is a "St Johnson's Day" celebrated. Local demands for his canonization were referred by letter to the Lambeth Conference in 1958, where a compromise that he was regarded as "Blessed" was offered. The Anglican Diocese of South West Tanganyika continues to regard Johnson as a saint.
