= Edward Steere =

English Anglican colonial bishop

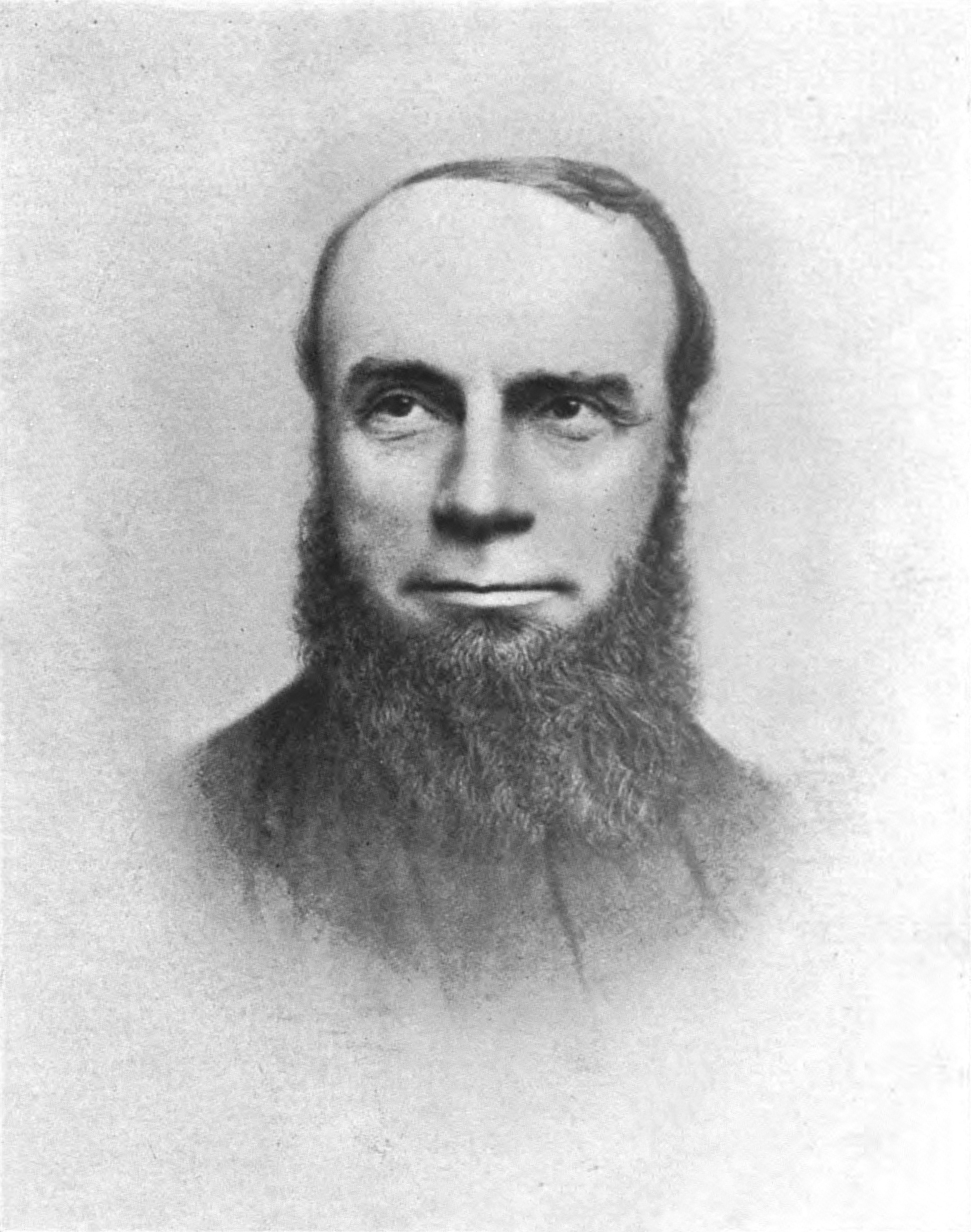
lithograph of Edward Steere

Edward Steere (1828 - 26 August 1882) was an English Anglican colonial bishop in the 19th century.

== Life ==
Steere was educated at London University and ordained in 1850. After curacies in Devon and Lincolnshire, he joined William Tozer (Bishop in Central Africa) on a mission to Nyasaland in 1863. He was appointed Bishop in Central Africa in 1874 and died on 26 August 1882.

Steere spent several periods in Zanzibar, 1864–68, 1872–74, and 1877–82. In 1873 he placed the foundation stone at Christ Church, Zanzibar, in Stone Town, Zanzibar. The cathedral was based on his vision; its concrete roof shaped in a barrel vault was Steere's idea. He also worked with David Livingstone to abolish slavery in Zanzibar. He is buried behind the altar in the church. David Livingstone's aides James Chuma and Abdullah Susi were part of an expedition led by Steere. Chuma was captain of the expedition and both men acted as interpreters.

== Works ==
Steere was a considerable linguist and published works on several East African languages and dialects, including Shambala, Yao, Nyamwezi, and Makonde. But he is especially known for his work on Swahili, publishing a Handbook of Swahili in 1870, and he also translated or revised the translation into Swahili of a large part of the Bible.

== See also ==
- Annie Allen (missionary)

Church of England titles
Preceded by William Tozer	Bishop in Central Africa; 1874 –1882	Succeeded by Charles Alan Smythies
