= Charles Smythies =

British colonial bishop

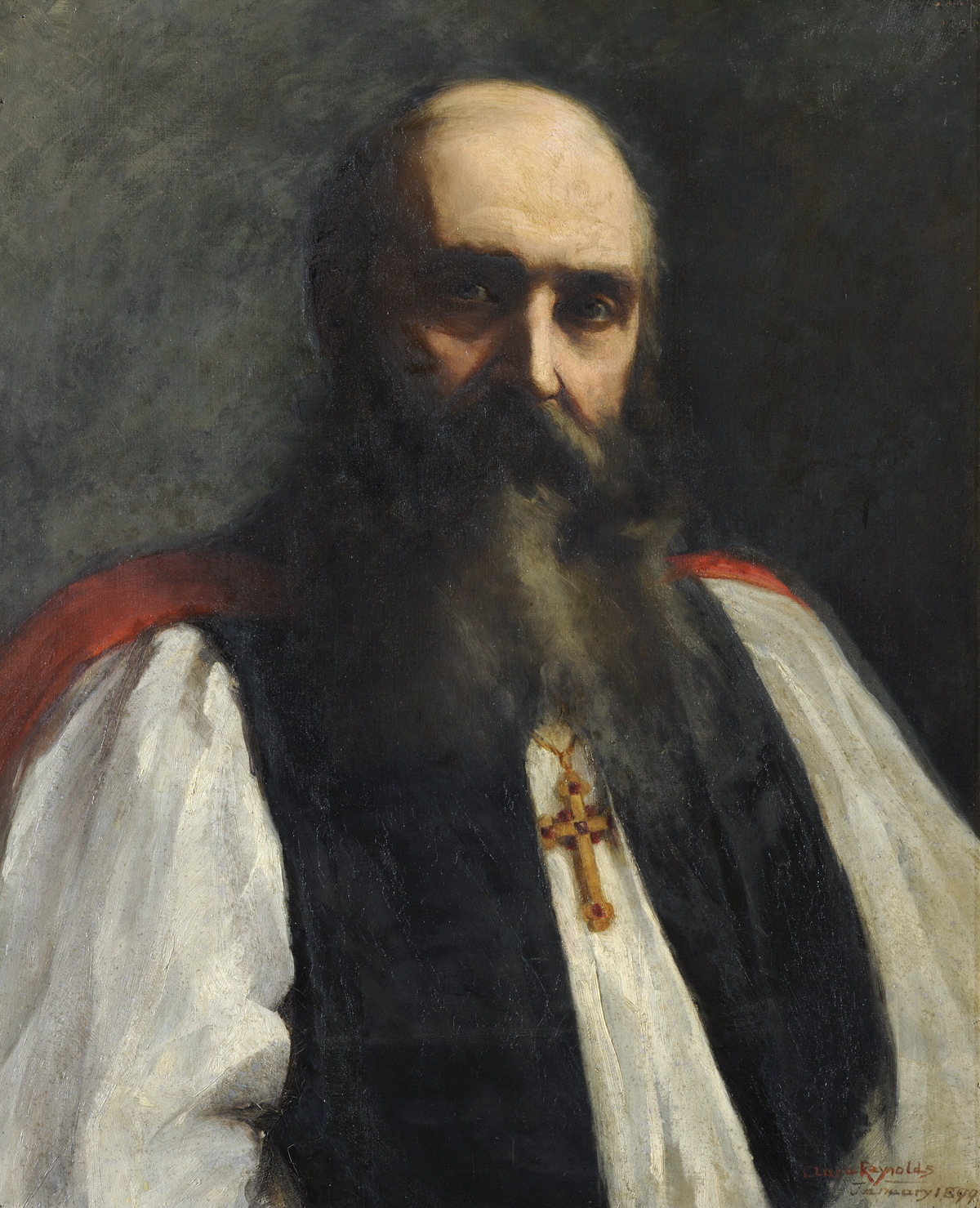
Portrait of Smythies by Clara Reynolds

Charles Alan Smythies (6 August 1844 – 7 May 1894) was a British colonial bishop in the 19th century.

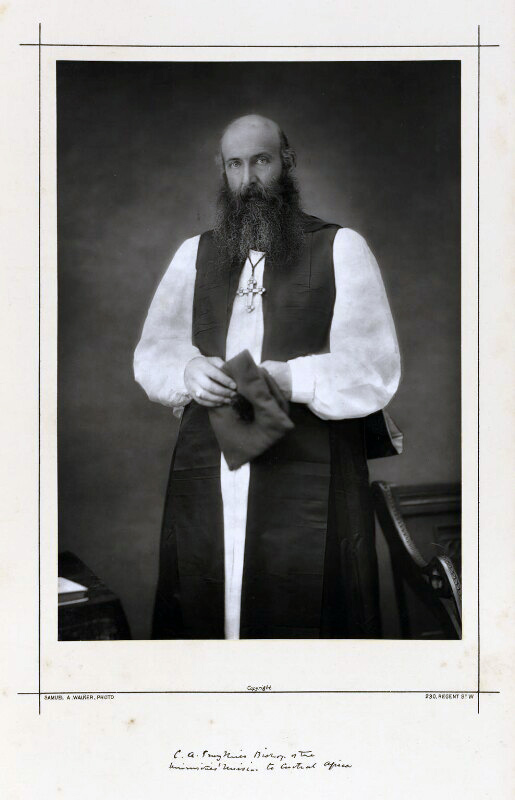
Portrait of Charles Smythies by Samuel Alexander Walker (February 1890)

== Life ==
Smythies was born in Colchester, the son of the Rev. Charles Norfolk Smythies, vicar of St-Mary-at-the-Walls there, and his wife Isabella Travers, daughter of Eaton Travers RN. He was educated at Felsted School and Trinity College, Cambridge, and ordained in 1869. His first post was a curacy in Great Marlow, after which he was Vicar of Roath in Cardiff.

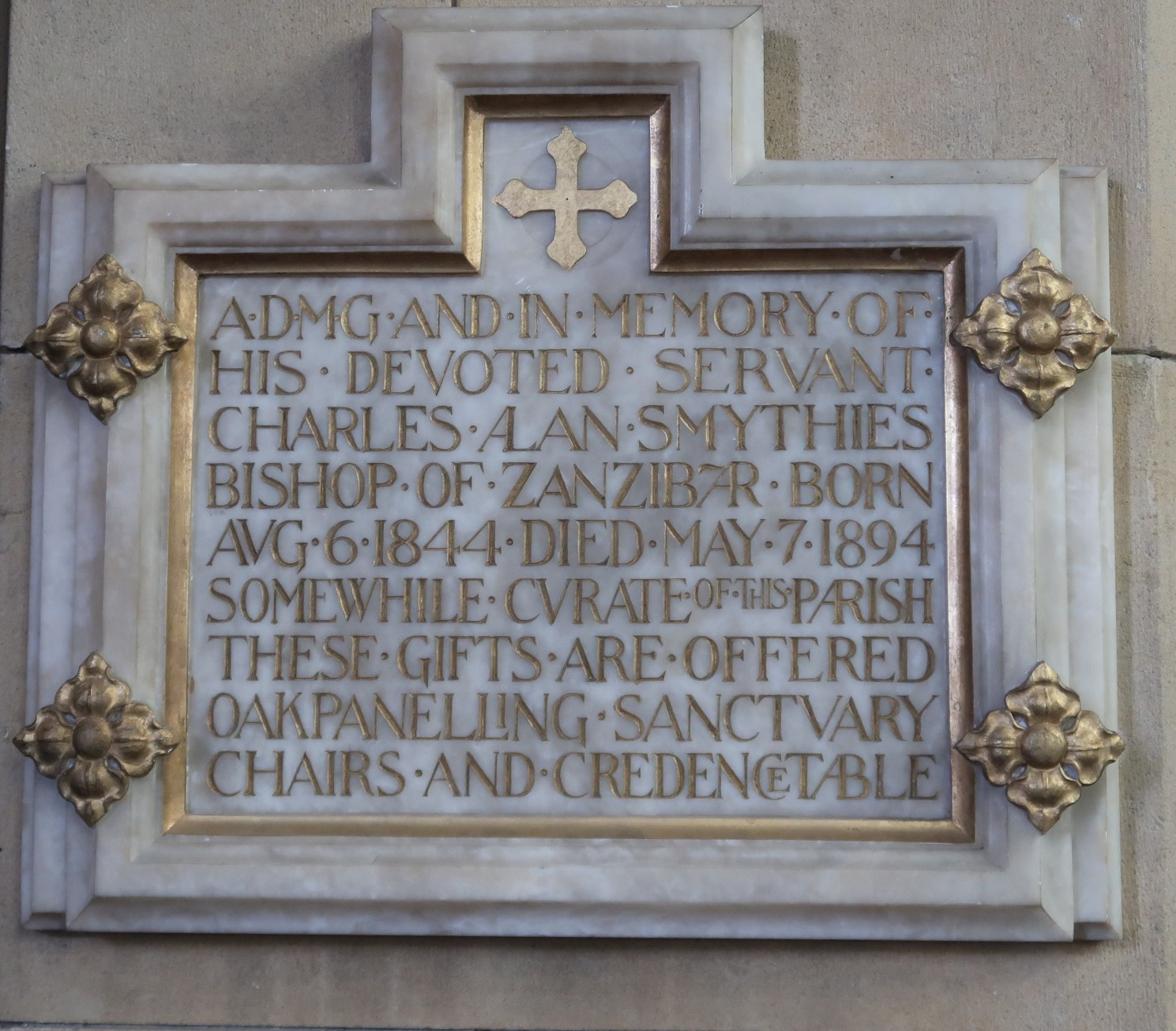
Charles Alan Smythies, Bishop of Zanzibar, memorial in All Saints Church, Great Marlow, UK

Smythies was the fourth Bishop of the Universities' Mission to Central Africa, and was consecrated on 30 November 1883, serving as Bishop in Central Africa until that diocese was split (by his initiative) in 1892, and then of one of the parts, Zanzibar, until his death.

== Bibliography ==
- Ernest Hermitage Day, Mission Heroes: Charles Alan Smythies, bishop of Zanzibar and Missionary Bishop in East Central Africa (London: Society for Promoting Christian Knowledge, 1900)
