= Global Fellowship of Confessing Anglicans =

Communion of conservative Anglican churches

- Type: Communion
- Classification: Protestant (Note: With various theological and doctrinal identities, including Anglo-Catholic and Evangelical)
- Orientation: Confessing Anglican
- Scripture: Protestant Bible
- Theology: Anglican doctrine
- Polity: Episcopal
- Governance: Global Anglican Council
- Chairman: Laurent Mbanda
- Vice Chairman: Miguel Uchôa
- General Secretary: Vacant
- Headquarters: Abuja, Nigeria
- Origin: 2008; 18 years ago Global Anglican Future Conference, Jerusalem
- Branched from: Anglican Communion
- Official website: gafcon.org

The Global Fellowship of Confessing Anglicans (branded as GAFCON or Gafcon after the Global Anglican Future Conference) is a communion of conservative Anglican churches aligned with the Confessing Movement that formed in 2008 in response to ongoing theological disputes in the worldwide Anglican Communion. As of 2025, GAFCON claims to represent upwards of 85% of the world's practising Anglicans. Peer-reviewed research from 2015 and 2016 indicates that the GAFCON-aligned provinces represent closer to 45% of practising Anglicans and just over 54% of members baptised in any of the provinces of the Anglican Communion.

Confessing Anglicans met in 2008 at the Global Anglican Future Conference, created the Jerusalem Declaration, and established the Fellowship of Confessing Anglicans (FCA), which was rebranded as GAFCON in 2017. At its founding, it consisted of the Anglican provinces of Rwanda; Nigeria; Uganda; Alexandria; Chile; Congo; Kenya, Myanmar; South Sudan; and the newly-formed Anglican Church in Brazil, Reformed Evangelical Anglican Church of South Africa, and Anglican Church in North America.

On October 16, 2025, GAFCON claimed to have broken ties with the Canterbury-based Anglican Communion. GAFCON also claimed in subsequent communications to not be leaving the Anglican Communion. The chairman of GAFCON, Laurent Mbanda, the Primate of Rwanda, declared that GAFCON would officially be renamed the Global Anglican Communion, asserting that they have not left the Anglican Communion but instead are the Anglican Communion. In March 2026, GAFCON declined to elect a "rival" primus inter pares to the Archbishop of Canterbury and, instead, reorganised its existing Primates' Council as the "Global Anglican Council"; and in August 2026, the Global Anglican Council announced that the headquarters of the Global Anglican Communion would be in Abuja, Nigeria.

== History ==
The Global Anglican Future Conference was held near Jerusalem in June 2008 at the initiative of theologically conservative Anglican leaders, mostly from Africa and Asia, from across the globe who opposed the ordination of homosexuals and the blessing of same-sex unions by member churches of the Anglican Communion. The meeting came as the culmination of a series of controversies in the Anglican Communion that began in 2003 when the openly non-celibate gay bishop Gene Robinson was consecrated by the Episcopal Church USA. GAFCON was organised as a conservative alternative to the 2008 Lambeth Conference, which was boycotted by many traditionalists, except, most notably, Bishop Anis. Mouneer Anis, the Presiding Bishop of Jerusalem and the Middle East (a conservative himself on matters of human sexuality), however, publicly announced he would not be one of the traditionalists attending GAFCON 2008; his observation was that "the Global South must not be driven by an exclusively Northern agenda or Northern personalities."

The GAFCON Final Statement produced at the first conference recognises the Archbishop of Canterbury for his historic role in the Anglican Church but denies that his recognition is the cornerstone of Anglican identity. The statement also called for the formation of "A Fellowship of Confessing Anglicans."

GAFCON was instrumental in the formation of the Anglican Church in North America in 2009. The ACNA was formed as an alternative church structure for those disaffected by the official Anglican structures in the United States and Canada. The Anglican Church of the Southern Cone of America, which covers much of South America, is a key constituent of the GAFCON movement. The Anglican Diocese of Sydney played an important role in forming the FCA and its Archbishop Peter Jensen was the FCA's first secretary.

On 6 July 2009, GAFCON was launched within the British Isles and by 2016 rebranded itself as GAFCON GB & Europe. Through this branch, the Anglican Network in Europe was created, and the Reformed Episcopal Church have been members of GAFCON GB & Europe since 2008. In 2015, Rod Thomas (a member of the executive of AMiE) was consecrated the provincial episcopal visitor for conservative evangelical members of the Church of England.

On 3 September 2009, GAFCON's South African branch was established by the initiative of Bishop Bethlehem Nopece, of the Anglican Diocese of Port Elizabeth. It incorporates Anglicans from three denominations: the Anglican Church of Southern Africa, the Reformed Evangelical Anglican Church of South Africa (REACH-SA) and the Traditional Anglican Communion. In 2023, REACH-SA was recognized as an "authentic Anglican province" by the Gafcon Primates' Council, and its presiding bishop, Glenn Lyons, was seated on the council.

GAFCON in New Zealand was launched in April 2016 in two conferences that took place in Auckland and Christchurch and united nearly 500 members from the entire country. Chairman Archbishop Eliud Wabukala from Kenya sent a message of support read at the conferences. Video greetings were also sent by Archbishop Foley Beach of the Anglican Church in North America, and Bishop Richard Condie of the Anglican Diocese of Tasmania and chairman of GAFCON Australia. Rev. Jay Behan became the chair of GAFCON New Zealand. The creation of GAFCON New Zealand was a result of the passing of Motion 30 by the Anglican Church of Aotearoa, New Zealand and Polynesia and the subsequent document "A Way Forward", proposing the blessing of same-sex marriages, presented at their General Synod in May 2014. The Church of Confessing Anglicans Aotearoa/New Zealand was established in 2019 with Behan as the inaugural bishop.

GAFCON helped to form the Diocese of the Southern Cross in 2022, a breakaway from the Anglican Church of Australia as a result of disagreements over same-sex marriage and other issues.

On October 16, 2025, in response to the Church of England's announcement of Sarah Mullally as the new Archbishop of Canterbury, the head of GAFCON, Laurent Mbanda, formally declared that GAFCON is the authentic Anglican Communion. He further stated that GAFCON "rejects" Archbishop of Canterbury, the Lambeth Conference, the Anglican Consultative Council and the Anglican Communion's Primates Meeting, which GAFCON says have "failed to uphold the doctrine and discipline of the Anglican Communion". GAFCON's primates also announced their intention to reorganize as the "Global Anglican Communion" in response. They reiterated that they are not leaving the Anglican Communion but have rather reorganized it under themselves as the Anglican Communion. As Mbanda explained, "We cannot continue to have communion with those who advocate the revisionist agenda, which has abandoned the inerrant word of God as the final authority and overturned Resolution I.10, of the 1998 Lambeth Conference."

On March 3–4, 2026, meeting in Abuja, GAFCON member churches confirmed their intention to remain a part of the Anglican Communion and framed their efforts as a reorganization and "continuity." GAFCON announced they planned to move forward with electing a "rival" primus inter pares to the Archbishop of Canterbury, with some member churches continuing to oppose the ordination of women as bishops. On March 5, 2026, after further discussion, GAFCON chose not to elect a "rival" primus inter pares and opted instead to elect a "Global Anglican Council."

On 29 August 2026, GAFCON's Global Anglican Council announced that the headquarters for the Global Anglican Communion would be in Abuja.

== Membership ==
As of 2025, GAFCON claims to represent upwards of 85% of the world's practising Anglicans. This claim is disputed. Peer-reviewed research from 2015 and 2016, published in the Journal of Anglican Studies by Cambridge University Press, indicates that GAFCON-aligned provinces represent closer to 45% of practising Anglicans and just over 54% of members baptized in any of the provinces of the Anglican Communion.

In 2020, additional peer-reviewed research focused on the Church of Nigeria—GAFCON's largest member church—Kenya, and Uganda. GAFCON claims that the Church of Nigeria has 25 million members, and the Church of Nigeria claims 18 million nominal members, but research published in the Journal of Anglican Studies estimated that 7.6 million Nigerians self-identified as Anglicans. The same research estimated the Anglican population in Kenya to be closer to 4.9 million and Uganda to be 10.9 million.

== Organization ==
The Global Fellowship of Confessing Anglicans aims to extend the goals of the GAFCON conferences into a movement, to "preach the biblical gospel [...] all over the world" and "provide aid to [...] faithful Anglicans" disaffected from their original churches. The fellowship recognizes the Jerusalem Declaration, written at the 2008 GAFCON meeting, as a "contemporary rule." The fellowship had been administered by a "Primates' Council" originally consisting of Primates from the African provinces of the Anglican Communion. In 2026, GAFCON voted to dissolve the Primates' Council and replace it with a newly elected "Global Anglican Council." In addition to GAFCON member primates indicated in the table below, membership in the council also included several advisers (including Glenn Davies, Andy Lines and Kanishka Raffel) and three "guarantors" (retired Archbishop Peter Akinola and laymen Olayinka Fisher and Emmanuel Kampouris). As of April 2026, GAFCON listed 12 provinces, 7 branches, and 2 branches "being formed."

=== Member provinces ===
Provinces	Territorial jurisdiction	Membership (baptized)	Anglican Communion member province	Global South Fellowship of Anglican Churches member	Represented on Global Anglican Council
Anglican Province of Alexandria	Algeria, Djibouti, Egypt, Eritrea, Ethiopia, Libya, Somalia, Tunisia	50,000	Yes	Yes	No
Anglican Church in Brazil	Brazil, Colombia, Venezuela, Central America	N/A	No	Yes	Yes (Primate Miguel Uchôa, Global Anglican Council vice chairman)
Anglican Church of Chile	Chile	20,000	Yes	Yes	Yes (Primate Enrique Lago)
Province of the Anglican Church of the Congo	Democratic Republic of the Congo, Republic of Congo	500,000	Yes	Yes	No
Anglican Network in Europe (proto-province)	Europe	N/A	No	No	Yes (Presiding Bishop Andy Lines)
Anglican Church of Kenya	Kenya	5,860,000	Yes	No	No
Church of the Province of Myanmar	Myanmar	62,000	Yes	Yes	No
Church of Nigeria	Nigeria	25,000,000	Yes	No	Yes (Primate Henry Ndukuba)
Anglican Church in North America	Canada, Mexico, United States	129,997	No	Yes	Yes (Acting Archbishop Julian Dobbs)
Province of the Anglican Church of Rwanda	Rwanda	1,500,000	Yes	No	Yes (Primate Manasseh Gahima)
Reformed Evangelical Anglican Church of South Africa	Malawi, Namibia, South Africa, Zimbabwe	100,000	No	No	Yes (Presiding Bishop Siegfried Ngubane)
Anglican Church of South America	Argentina, Bolivia, Paraguay, Peru, Uruguay	46,100	Yes	Yes	No
Province of the Episcopal Church of South Sudan	South Sudan	4,000,000	Yes	Yes	No
Church of Uganda	Uganda	13,311,801	Yes	Yes	Yes (Primate Stephen Kaziimba)
GAFCON		51,580,012	-		

=== Non-provincial GAFCON branches ===
Branches	Territorial jurisdiction	Membership (in thousands of people)	Other affiliated entities	Represented on Global Anglican Council
Gafcon Australia	Australia	TBD	Anglican Diocese of Sydney, Anglican Diocese of Tasmania, Diocese of the Southern Cross	Yes (Archbishop Kanishka Raffel, Archbishop Glenn Davies)
Gafcon GB and Europe	Great Britain, continental Europe	TBD	Anglican Network in Europe, Free Church of England, Reformed Episcopal Church	Yes (Presiding Bishop Andy Lines)
Gafcon Ghana	Ghana	TBD	Anglican Diocese of Sunyani	No
Gafcon Ireland	Ireland	TBD		No
Church of Confessing Anglicans Aotearoa New Zealand	New Zealand	TBD		Yes (Presiding Bishop Jay Behan)
Gafcon Tanzania	Tanzania	TBD	Anglican Church of Tanzania Dioceses of Tabora, Mara, Mpwapwa, Tarime, Kibondo, Mount Kilimanjaro, Rorya, Shinyanga, Lake Rukwa, and Western Tanganyika	No

== Ordination of women ==
The ordination of women to holy orders and the offices of deacon, priest (presbyter), and bishop remains controversial in GAFCON. Among the member churches of GAFCON, there is a diversity of approaches to women's ordination. Nigeria ordains women only to the diaconate within limitations. Kenya, Rwanda, South Sudan, and Uganda ordain women as priests. The Province of Myanmar "accepted the ordination of women in principle", but, as of 2002, had not ordained women. Kenya and South Sudan have ordained women as bishops.

In 2006, the Church of Nigeria planned to ordain women to the diaconate but not as priests or bishops. In 2010, the church moved forward with those plans and began to ordain women as deacons, with limitations "for specific purposes like hospital work and school services" The Church of Nigeria continues to prohibit the ordination of women as priests or bishops.

The Church of Uganda has ordained women as deacons since 1973 and as priests since 1983. The Province of the Anglican Church of the Congo permits the ordination of women as deacons. In 2003, the Diocese of Boga, in the Congo, ordained the first woman as a priest. The Anglican Church of South America has allowed each diocese to permit the ordination of women as priests since 2015. The Anglican Church of Uruguay, a diocese of South America, ordained the first women as priests that same year.

The Anglican Church in North America allows each diocese to decide whether to ordain women as deacons or priests but does not permit the ordination of women as bishops. In 2023, the Diocese of the Southern Cross (Australia) welcomed its first female priest. The Anglican Network in Europe is made up of two groups of churches: the Anglican Mission in England (AMiE) and the Anglican Convocation in Europe (ACE). The AMiE does not ordain women, and the ACE permits the ordination of women as deacons and priests but not as bishops. The Reformed Evangelical Anglican Church of South Africa does not permit the ordination of women.

Women in the episcopacy continues to divide GAFCON. In 2016, the Episcopal Church of Sudan consecrated the first woman, Elizabeth Awut Ngor, as bishop, the first woman bishop among the GAFCON members. In 2018, the primatial bishops of the GAFCON member churches agreed to a moratorium on further ordinations of women to the episcopate. In 2021, the Anglican Church of Kenya consecrated two women as bishops: Emily Onyango as an assisting bishop and Rose Okeno as the diocesan bishop of the Diocese of Butere. In 2022, Archbishop Kaziimba of the Church of Uganda confirmed that a woman may be ordained a bishop in the Church of Uganda.

In 2025, GAFCON opposed the appointment of Sarah Mullally (who expressed liberal views on blessing same-sex couples in the Church of England) as the next Archbishop of Canterbury. It stated that her appointment was a cause for "sorrow" and demonstrated that the Church of England had "relinquished its authority to lead." While some were opposed to the appointee being a woman, the Church of Uganda's Stephen Kaziimba stated his opposition to Sarah Mullally's appointment was based on her views, not her gender.

== See also ==
- Global Anglican Future Conference
- Anglican realignment
- Homosexuality and Anglicanism
