= Augustino Ramadhani =

Tanzanian soldier, jurist and Christian leader (1945–2020)

Augustino Steven Lawrence Ramadhani
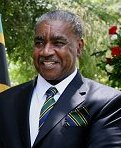
- Ramadhani on 23 February 2012

Chief Justice of Zanzibar Islands
- In office October 1978 – 1989
- Preceded by: Ali Haji Pandu
- Succeeded by: Hamid Muhamad Hamid

Chief Justice of Tanzania Republic
- In office 2007–2010
- Preceded by: Barnabas A. Samatta
- Succeeded by: Mohamed Chande Othman

President of African Court on Human and Peoples' Rights
- In office 2014–2016
- Preceded by: Sophia Akuffo
- Succeeded by: Sylvain Oré

Episcopal vicar of the Diocese of Dar es Salaam
- In office 2 March 2017 – 4 February 2018
- Preceded by: Bishop Valentino Mokiwa
- Succeeded by: Right Reverend Jackson Sosthenes

Personal details
- Born: 28 December 1945 Zanzibar, Sultanate of Zanzibar
- Died: 28 April 2020 (aged 74) Dar es Salaam, Tanzania
- Relatives: John Ramadhani (nephew); Cecil Majaliwa (grandfather)
- Profession: Lawyer . judge . tutor . priest . civil servant . jurist . author

Augustino Steven Lawrence Ramadhani (28 December 1945 – 28 April 2020) was a Tanzanian soldier, jurist and Christian leader. He was Chief Justice of the Judiciary of Tanzania from 2007 to 2010, and a Judge of the African Court on Human and Peoples' Rights from 2010 to 2016. From 2017 to 2018 he was episcopal vicar of the Diocese of Dar es Salaam.

== Family and early years ==
Augustino Ramadhani was born in Kisima Majongoo, Zanzibar on 28 December 1945. His grandfather was the Reverend Cecil Majaliwa, first African priest of the Universities' Mission to Central Africa. His parents were Matthew Douglas Ramadhani and Bridget Ann Constance Masoud, both teachers. He was second in a family of four girls and four boys. His brother, John Ramadhani, became Bishop of Zanzibar from 1980 to 2002 and Archbishop of the Anglican Church of Tanzania from 1984 to 1998. His father was promoted to headmaster in 1952 and transferred to teach in Mpwapwa. Augustino Ramadhani attended primary school in Mpwapwa and finished standard eight in 1959.

Ramadhani attended Tabora Boys High School from 1960 to 1965, where he learned to play piano. He also played basketball, and did well despite not being tall. When he was 15 his father died in a train accident in Guide Bridge, Ashton-under-Lyne, England. Despite financial worries, he managed to continue his education to the university level. Ramadhani obtained a Bachelor of Laws Degree from the University of East Africa in 1970 and a Master of Laws degree from the University of Dar es Salaam in 1978. His specialty was International Law (the law of armed conflict). He married Lieutenant Canal Saada Mbarouk on 1 November 1975. They had four children, Francis, Bridget, Marine and Matthew.

== Military career ==
After obtaining his first degree in 1970 Ramadhani joined the Tanzania People's Defence Force (JWTZ). He trained in the Military Academy of Tanzania from 1970 to 1971, and while training was the lawyer of the JWTZ. When he left the academy he was promoted to second lieutenant and appointed to head the Mugulani Camp in Dar es Salaam. In 1978 he was promoted to Major and transferred to Tabora as the head of JWTZ's Faru Brigade. From 1978 to 1979 he was seconded from the army to serve as Deputy Chief Justice and then Chief Justice of Zanzibar.

In March 1979 he returned to the JWTZ during the Uganda–Tanzania war under Idi Amin. He served as judge of the military court in Uganda. After the war he was able to return to Zanzibar as Chief Justice. He eventually reached the rank of brigadier general in the army. He was finally released from the army in 1996 with the return of democracy to Tanzania.

== Jurist ==
In 1978, when Abdul Jumbe Mwinyi was president of Zanzibar, the government of Zanzibar appointed Ramadhani deputy Chief Justice of Zanzibar. The Judge of Appeal's Court and Chief Justice at this time was Damian Lubuva. In October 1978 Ramadhani was appointed to be the Chief Justice of Zanzibar. He left office in March 1979 during the war, but after it ended on 8 January 1980 he was again appointed Chief Justice of Zanzibar. He held this office until 1989, when he was succeeded by Judge Hamid Muhamad Hamid.

Ramadhani was a Justice of Appeal of the United Republic of Tanzania from 23 June 1989 to 2010, when he reached the compulsory retirement age of 65. He was a judge of the East African Court of Justice from November 2001 to 2007. In his last three years on the bench he was the Chief Justice of Tanzania from 2007 to 2010. Ramadhani was elected Judge of the African Court on Human and Peoples' Rights in 2010 for a six-year term. He was president of the court from 2014 to 2016, when he retired. In 2016 he spoke in the Justice and Democracy Session of CUMIPAZ 2016, a conference organized by the Global Embassy of Activists for Peace. In 2020 he was a General Secretary of the International Council of Jurists.

== Church ==
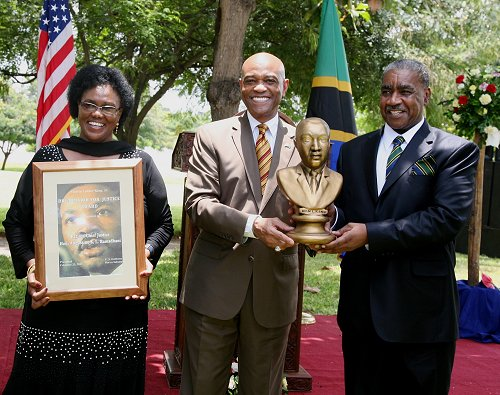
US Ambassador Alfonso Lenhardt (center) bestows the 2012 "Dr. Martin Luther King, Jr. Drum Major for Justice Award" to Chief Justice Augustino Steven Lawrence Ramadhani (right), accompanied by Mrs. Sada Mbaruk Ramadhani

Ramadhani was active in the Anglican Church of Tanzania. He was a good chorister, and a pianist. Even after joining the army he continued to serve as secretary for the parish of St Alban in Dar es Salaam. In 2000 he was appointed Provincial Registrar of the Anglican Church of Tanzania, a position he held until he was appointed Chief Justice of Tanzania in 2007. Ramadhani was awarded a Bachelor of Divinity from the University of London in 2004. He was made a Lay Canon on 25 July 2007 at All Saints Cathedral in the Diocese of Mpwapwa. On 14 May 2013 he was consecrated deacon, and he was made a priest on 29 December 2013 in the Cathedral of Christ in Zanzibar.

On 2 March 2017 Archbishop Jacob Chimeledya licensed Ramadhani as a priest of the Diocese of Mpwapwa and appointed him to lead St Albans Cathedral Church in Dar es Salaam in place of Bishop Valentino Mokiwa, who had been deposed from office on 7 January 2017. Ramadhani was episcopal vicar of the Diocese of Dar es Salaam until 4 Feb 2018 when the Right Reverend Jackson Sosthenes was consecrated bishop of the diocese.

== Other occupations ==
Ramadhani was vice chairman of the National Electoral Commission from 1993 to 2003. The commission conducts presidential, parliamentary and local government elections in Tanzania. He was vice chairman of the Zanzibar Electoral Commission from 2002 to 2007. He was chairman of Executive Council of the Southern African Development Community (SADC) Electoral Commission Forum in 2006 and 2007. In 2012 Ramadhani was made deputy chairman of the Commission of Constitution's Amendment, while retired Prime Minister Joseph Warioba was chairman.

== Death ==
Augustino Ramadhani died on 28 April 2020 in the Aga Khan Hospital, Dar es Salaam.

== Works ==
Ramadhani has published various writings on human rights and legal topics. They include:

- Promoting a New Economic Order in Developing Countries: A Role for Human Rights Organizations in Speaking about Rights (Canada Human Rights Foundation Newsletter) Vol. XI No. 3/1996,
- Electoral Process in a Multiparty Democracy, in Fundamental Rights and Freedoms in Tanzania (Mkuki na Nyota Publishers, 1978).
- John Thomas Mhina Sepeku : Askofu wa kwanza dayosisi ya Dar es Salaam na askofu mkuu wa kwanza, Kanisa Anglikana, Tanzania by Augustino S. L Ramadhani
- Judicial system of Tanzania : Zanzibar by Augustino S. L Ramadhani
- The Zanzibar court system in the twenty years of the revolution by Augustino S. L Ramadhani
- Twenty Five Years of the Court of Appeal of Tanzania and the Establishment of the East African Court of Justice by Augustino S. L Ramadhani
- Public order organs in a multiparty democracy by Augustino S. L Ramadhani
