= John Hayden (bishop) =

British retired Anglican bishop (born 1940)

- Assistant Bishop of Mount Kilimanjaro
- Church: Anglican Church of Tanzania
- Diocese: Diocese of Mount Kilimanjaro
- In office: 2004–2009
- Successor: Isaiah Chambala (as Bishop of Kiteto)
- Other posts: Honorary assistant bishop, Diocese of Chester (2008–present)

Orders
- Ordination: 1965 (deacon); 1966 (priest) by Gerald Ellison
- Consecration: 2003

Personal details
- Born: 1940 (age 85–86)
- Denomination: Anglican
- Education: University of London; Tyndale Hall, Bristol

John Donald Hayden (born 1940) is a British retired Anglican bishop. He served in Tanzania as Assistant Bishop of Mount Kilimanjaro and is now an honorary assistant bishop in the Diocese of Chester.

Hayden received a Bachelor of Divinity (BD) degree from the University of London in 1962 and left ministerial training at Tyndale Hall, Bristol in 1963. He was then ordained a deacon at Michaelmas (26 September) 1965 and a priest the next Michaelmas (25 September 1966), both times by Gerald Ellison, Bishop of Chester, at Chester Cathedral. He served his titles (curacies) at Macclesfield (until 1968) and then Holy Spirit Cathedral, Dodoma (until 1969). He then became Vicar of Moshi for seven years, 1970–1977; and Home Secretary for the United Society for Christian Literature, 1977–1983.

Hayden spent eleven years as Team Vicar of St Mary at Stoke with Stoke Park, Suffolk (1983–1994) before a ten-year incumbency of St Mary's, Bury St Edmunds (as Priest-in-Charge until 1999 then Vicar until 2004). He was consecrated a bishop in 2003, to serve in Tanzania as Assistant Bishop of Mount Kilimanjaro (2004–2009): as assistant bishop in the Anglican Church of Tanzania Diocese of Mount Kilimanjaro, his task was to prepare the southern portion of that diocese to become a separate diocese; the new Diocese of Kiteto was duly erected in 2009. Hayden retired back to Cheshire in 2008, where he has been licensed as an honorary assistant bishop of the Diocese of Chester.

Hayden first went to the Middle East in 1964 and has continued to lead pilgrimages there since. He has written 7 pilgrim guides covering this area. Those in print in 2017 are the Holy Land, Greece and Christ in Glory covering the 7 churches of Revelation in W Turkey.
