= Jackson Sosthenes =

Bishop of Dar es Salaam
- Incumbent
- Assumed office 4 February 2018

Personal details
- Occupation: Anglican Bishop

Jackson Sosthenes is the Bishop of Dar es Salaam.

== Background ==
Jackson Sosthenes is an evangelical who was educated at the Trinity School for Ministry in the United States. In September 2016 Pastor Jackson Sosthenes led a mass at St Albans Cathedral Church in Dar es Salaam where President John Magufuli called on all churches, religions and political parties to love each other and work together to help the nation develop.

== Consecration ==
On 7 January 2017 Archbishop Jacob Chimeledya deposed Bishop Valentino Mokiwa of Dar es Salaam. Mokiwa was deposed after he refused to resign after a corruption probe uncovered mismanagement of church assets. On 2 March 2017 Chimeledya licensed Augustino Ramadhani, a former Chief Justice of Tanzania, as a priest of the Diocese of Mpwapwa and appointed him to lead the diocese of Dar es Salaam in place of Mokiwa. Sosthenes was consecrated bishop of the diocese by Chimeledya on 4 Feb 2018. President John Magufuli spoke soon after the ordainment, and called for religious leaders to encourage forgiveness and resolve conflicts that create divisions among worshipers.

== Sources ==
- Conger, George (8 February 2018), "Battle for Dar es Salaam ends with consecration of new bishop", Anglican Ink
- Conger, George (28 April 2020), "Tanzania's Augustino Ramadhani dead", Anglican Ink
- Khalifa Said (5 February 2018), "Stop dividing the faithful, says JPM", The Citizen
- Katare Mbashiru (5 February 2018), "Tanzania: Bury Nasty Past, Turn Over New Leaf... President Magufuli Urges Religious Leaders", Tanzania Daily News, Dar es Salaam – via AllAfrica
- "President Pushes For Complete Peace", IBN TV, Al-itrah Foundation, September 2016, archived from the original on 2020-07-20
