= Diocese of Recife =

Diocese of Recife may refer to:

- Archdiocese of Olinda and Recife, in northeast Brazil's Pernambuco state
- Diocese of Recife, in the Anglican Church in Brazil, affiliated with the Global Fellowship of Confessing Anglicans
- Diocese of Recife, in the Anglican Episcopal Church of Brazil, affiliated with the Anglican Communion
