= John Ball (bishop) =

Anglican bishop (1934–2016)

- Assistant Bishop of Central Tanganyika
- Church: Anglican Church of Tanzania
- Diocese: Diocese of Central Tanganyika
- In office: 1996–2000
- Other posts: Honorary assistant bishop, Diocese of Chelmsford (2000–2016)

Orders
- Ordination: 1959 (deacon); 1960 (priest)
- Consecration: 14 January 1996

Personal details
- Born: 1934
- Died: 5 September 2016 (aged 81–82)
- Buried: Holy Trinity Church, Springfield, Chelmsford
- Denomination: Anglican
- Spouse: Anne Ball
- Education: University College of South Wales and Monmouthshire

John Martin Ball (11 December 1934 – 5 September 2016) was a British Anglican bishop. He was Assistant Bishop of Central Tanganyika in the Anglican Church of Tanzania, and retired to the Church of England.

Ball graduated from the University College of South Wales and Monmouthshire with a Bachelor of Arts (BA) degree in 1955, before attending Tyndale Hall, Bristol, training for the priesthood. He was ordained a deacon at Michaelmas (20 September) 1959 by Anthony Hoskyns-Abrahall, Bishop of Lancaster and a priest at Michaelmas (15 September) 1960 by George Holderness, Bishop of Burnley (both times in Blackburn Cathedral), to serve as curate of St Jude's Blackburn until 1963.

In Kenya, he became a curate in Eldoret (1969–1971, serving as a youth worker) and at Nakuru Cathedral (1971–1975) and then Vicar of St Francis Karen, Nairobi (1975–1979). He then served the Bible Churchmen's Missionary Society as Deputy General Secretary (1979–1981) and then as General Secretary (1981–1995), during which time the society's name changed to Crosslinks (from 1993). During his time as General Secretary, he was also honorary curate of Christ Church Sidcup, Greater London (Diocese of Rochester); and he became an honorary canon of Karamoja, Uganda in 1988, retaining that honour until his death. He also served in Kenya as press manager for the Anglican Church of Kenya.

Ball was consecrated on 14 January 1996 to be Assistant Bishop of Central Tanganyika, in the Diocese of Central Tanganyika, Anglican Church of Tanzania, in which post he served until his 2000 retirement. He retired back to the United Kingdom, where he was licensed an honorary assistant bishop of the Diocese of Chelmsford from 2000 until his death; and where he would preach at Holy Trinity Springfield, Essex. He was married to Anne, and they had three children.
