= Miguel Uchôa =

Brazilian Anglican bishop

The Most Reverend Miguel Uchôa
- Primate of the Anglican Church in Brazil; Bishop of Recife
- Church: Anglican Church in Brazil; Formerly; Anglican Episcopal Church of Brazil
- Diocese: Anglican Diocese of Recife
- In office: 2012–present (as diocesan bishop); 2018–present (as primate)
- Predecessor: Robinson Cavalcanti

Orders
- Consecration: December 8, 2012 by Roger Ames

Miguel Uchôa Cavalcanti is a Brazilian Anglican bishop and author. Since 2012, he has been diocesan bishop of the Diocese of Recife, which broke away from the Anglican Communion-recognized Anglican Episcopal Church of Brazil (IEAB), and since 2018, he has been the first primate of the GAFCON-recognized Anglican Church in Brazil (IAB). Uchôa is also rector of the Anglican Parish of the Holy Spirit (known by its Portuguese acronym PAES) in greater Recife, which is considered one of the largest Anglican churches in Latin America with more than 1,000 worshipers.

== Early life and ministry ==
Uchôa studied fishing engineering and was converted to Protestant Christianity through the work of Aliança Bíblica Universitária do Brasil, a campus ministry organization. He received his theological education from the Seminário Teológico Batista do Norte do Brasil. Uchôa was married to Valéria Uchôa until her death in 2018; they had two sons. His second marriage was to Juliane.

Since 1979, Uchôa has been active in the charismatic renewal movement in Brazil. In 1996, he planted Parróquia Anglicana Espíritu Santo (PAES) in the Jaboatão dos Guararapes area of metro Recife. He and PAES were part of the Fresh Expressions movement, conducting Christian outreach in cafes, museums, beaches and skate parks. With more than 1,000 parishioners, PAES grew to become the largest Anglican congregation in Latin America.

== Anglican realignment ==
In 2004, following the deposition of Recife bishop Robinson Cavalcanti by the IEAB, Uchôa joined two-thirds of the clergy and roughly 95 percent of the laity in disaffiliating from the IEAB and joining an independent Diocese of Recife under the "extra-provincial recognition" of Greg Venables, primate of the Anglican Church of the Southern Cone. In October 2012, after Cavalcanti's murder, Uchôa was elected to succeed him. In December 2012, he was consecrated and installed as bishop of Recife.

In 2015, an appellate court in Pernambuco ruled that diocesan assets belonged to the IEAB-affiliated rump diocese, resulting in the loss of four churches. After the ruling, in 2016, the GAFCON-aligned group led by Uchôa reconstituted itself as the Anglican Church–Diocese of Recife.

In May 2018, GAFCON recognized the Anglican Church–Diocese of Recife as an autonomous province, the Anglican Church in Brazil. Uchôa was installed as the IAB's first primate. To form the new province, the diocese split into three dioceses (Recife, Vitória and João Pessoa) and a missionary region encompassing the rest of Brazil.

As primate, Uchôa has participated in the 2018 Global Anglican Future Conference in Jerusalem and the 2020 enthronement of Stephen Kaziimba as archbishop of the Church of Uganda. He is a member of the GAFCON Primates Council and a member of the Global South Fellowship of Anglican Churches. In 2023, after the Church of England General Synod's vote to welcome blessings of same-sex unions, he signed the Global South statement rejecting the Archbishop of Canterbury's leadership of the Anglican Communion. At the fourth quinquennial GAFCON event in Kigali in April 2023, Uchôa was elected vice chairman of GAFCON.

Religious titles
Preceded by Robinson Cavalcanti	Bishop of Recife; 2012–present	Incumbent
New title	Primate of the Anglican Church in Brazil; 2018–present	Incumbent
Preceded by Laurent Mbanda	Vice Chairman of GAFCON (with Kanishka Raffel); 2023–present	Incumbent
