= Diocese of Kondoa =

The Diocese of Kondoa may refer to:

- Anglican Diocese of Kondoa, in Tanzania
- Roman Catholic Diocese of Kondoa, in Tanzania
