= Bishop Cyril =

Bishop Cyril may refer to:

- Cyril of Alexandria
- Cyril Stuart, Bishop in Uganda from 1932 to 1952
