= Bassotto =

Bassotto may refer to:

- Semovente da 105/25, Italian World War II gun known as Bassotto (dachshund)

== People with the surname ==
- Marinez Santos Bassotto (born 1970), Brazilian bishop
