= William Baker (bishop of Zanzibar) =

Anglican Bishop of Zanzibar (1902–1990)

William Scott Baker (called Bill; 22 June 1902 – 30 November 1990) was an Anglican bishop in the Diocese of Zanzibar and its successors.

== Early years ==
Baker was born into an ecclesiastical family. His father was William Wing Carew Baker, sometime Vicar of Southill, Bedfordshire and Canon. Baker was educated at King's College School, Cambridge, Aldenham School and King's College, Cambridge. He was ordained in 1927 after studying at Ripon College Cuddesdon. He was chaplain of his old college and assistant curate of St Giles with St Peter's, Cambridge, from 1925 to 1932. After this he was Vicar of St John the Baptist's, Newcastle on Tyne, when he was ordained to the episcopate by William Temple, Archbishop of Canterbury, on St Matthew's Day 1943 (21 September), at Westminster Abbey.

== Career ==
Baker was enthroned as Bishop of Zanzibar in 1943. In 1963, his diocese was renamed to become the Diocese of Zanzibar and Dar es Salaam, and in 1965 it became the Diocese of Zanzibar and Tanga when the Diocese of Dar es Salaam was partitioned out under John Sepeku, the first African diocesan bishop in Tanzania. Baker continued in the diocese until 1968, when he returned to the UK to serve as both Assistant Bishop of Liverpool and as lecturer at St Katharine's College, Liverpool. He retired from lecturing in 1975 and as assistant bishop in 1987.

== Death ==
He died on 30 November 1990.

Church of England titles
Preceded by Thomas Birley	Bishop of Zanzibar; 1943–1963	Succeeded by Himself as Bishop of Zanzibar and Dar es Salaam
New title	Bishop of Zanzibar and Dar es Salaam; 1963–1965	Succeeded by John Sepeku as Bishop of Dar es Salaam
New title	Bishop of Zanzibar and Dar es Salaam; 1963–1965	Succeeded by Himself as Bishop of Zanzibar and Tanga
New title	Bishop of Zanzibar and Tanga; 1965–1968	Succeeded by Yohana Jumaa
