= Diocese of Dar es Salaam =

The Diocese of Dar es Salaam may refer to:

- Anglican Diocese of Dar es Salaam, in the city of Dar es Salaam, Tanzania
- Roman Catholic Archdiocese of Dar es Salaam, in the city of Dar es Salaam, Tanzania
