= Robinson Cavalcanti =

Brazilian Anglican bishop (1944–2012)

Edward Robinson de Barros Cavalcanti (Recife, 21 June 1944 – Olinda, 26 February 2012) was a Brazilian Anglican bishop and professor. He was the conservative bishop of the Anglican Diocese of Recife, in the Anglican Episcopal Church of Brazil. He led his diocese to a schism because of the pro-homosexuality policies of the province, who were against the official stance of the Anglican Communion, in 2005. He was expelled the same year and renamed his departing diocese as Anglican Church – Diocese of Recife, who became associated with the Anglican Church of the Southern Cone of America and the Global Anglican Future Conference, and would lead the way to the creation of the Anglican Church in Brazil.

== Biography ==
He was born in Recife, but his family moved to União dos Palamares, in Alagoas, when he was three years old. He was raised in the Roman Catholic faith of his mother, while his father was a kardecist. He did his secondary school studies at this city, moving in 1960 to the Evangelical College XV November, of the Presbyterian faith, in Garanhuns. He returned to Recife to study at the Jesuit Nóbrega College, the following year. He finished his degree in 1962. He studied Social Sciences at the Catholic University of Pernambuco, from 1963 to 1966, and also English Language at the Brazil-US Cultural Society. From 1963 to 1967, simultaneously, he also studied Law at the Federal University of Pernambuco. At the same time, he also participated at the students political life. He did an internship at the Social Sciences Department of the University of California, in Los Angeles.

He started his work as a lawyer, and at the same time, as a professor in several religious owned institutions, like the Presbyterian Agnes Erskine College. He taught political science in five religious-owned establishments, the Faculty of Philosophy of Recife, the Presbyterian Seminary of the North, the Catholic University of Pernambuco, the Federal University of Pernambuco and the Federal Rural University of Pernambuco. He took a master's degree in political science at the Cândido Mendes University, in 1974–75, where he defended the thesis Alagoas – a Guarda Nacional e as Origens do Coronelismo. He was a professor in several universities in Brazil for 35 years.

== Religious career ==
In 1962, he left Catholicism and Kardecist Spiritism. On October 31, 1963 (Reformation Day), he was confirmed at the Evangelical Lutheran Church of Brazil (IELB). He was an evangelist and a candidate to the ordained Lutheran Ministry.

After years of study and rapprochement, he joined the then Episcopal Church of Brazil (IEB), in a ceremony held at the Holy Trinity Cathedral at the hands of the Bishop of the Anglican Diocese of Recife, Edmund Knox Sherrill, on June 21, 1976. He later would be ordained deacon and priest, working in the Holy Trinity Cathedral, and in the Good Samaritan, Emanuel and Redemption parishes (always unpaid). He joined the International Gideons and the Rotary Club along with missionary Pedro Higino Marques da Silva.

In 1997 he was elected and consecrated Bishop of the Diocese of Recife, attending the Lambeth Conference of 1998, actively participating in the network of Anglican conservatives regarding the Holy Scriptures, the Creeds and the Historical Ethics of the Church. As a diocesan bishop, he ordained dozens of deacons and elders. In the seven years until 2005, communities were opened, social projects were created, archives, secretariats and commissions, and the Canons were reformulated, vocations stimulated, the Permanent Diaconate and the Local Ministry were created, as well as the institution of Lay Ministers and Evangelists. At IEAB he was president of the National Board of Theological Education-JUNET.

On 25 January 2005, Bishop Robinson Cavalcanti, then bishop of the Anglican Diocese of Recife, opposing the predominance of the liberal wing in the church, promoted a schism. Cavalcanti's decision came in opposition to the IEAB's acceptance of non-chaste homosexuality. He unilaterally declared the suspension of the diocese of Recife with the Province of Brazil, proclaiming it as an "autonomous diocese of the Anglican Communion". Although a rare and extreme act, he was expelled from the IEAB on 10 June 2005, by decision of the Superior Ecclesiastical Court.

Expelled from the Anglican Episcopal Church of Brazil, Robinson Cavalcanti created the Diocese of Recife, which tried to join the Anglican Church of the Southern Cone of America. Subsequently, for reasons of judicial order and institutional name, the Diocese of Recife was renamed Anglican Church-Diocese of Recife, and became linked to the GAFCON, which reunites the majority of Anglicans in the world.

== Death ==
After years of life devoted to the Church, Archbishop Robinson Cavalcanti and his wife, Miriam Nunes Machado Cotias Cavalcanti, where both murdered in Olinda on February 26, 2012, being stabbed to death by their adoptive son, Eduardo Cavalcanti. The murderer lived in the state of Florida, and returned to Brazil days earlier because of the threat of deportation. Reports point out that Eduardo was taken to the United States at the age of 16 to live with his aunt, due to the relationship problems found in his family life (such as rebellion and violent moments), but was never abandoned by his parents.

He left a daughter, Carla Alessandra de Medeiros Cavalcanti, the result of a relationship he had out of wedlock with one of his masters students from the UFRPE Political Science course before being ordained a minister.

== Legacy ==
He published several books on religious matters. Some of the Cavalcanti's works include:

- Cristo na Universidade Brasileira
- O Cristão, Esse Chato
- Uma Benção Chamada Sexo
- As Origens do Coronelismo
- Igreja – Agência de Transformação Histórica
- Igreja – Comunidade da Liberdade
- Libertação e Sexualidade
- Cristianismo e Política
- A Utopia Possível
- A Igreja, o País e o Mundo
- Igreja – Multidão Madura
- Reforçando as trincheiras
- The amok of Pedro, for whom Cavalcanti wrote to bishop Douglas Cameron in 1996.

Religious titles
Preceded by Clóvis Erly Rodrigues	Bishop of Recife (IEAB); 1997–2005	Succeeded by Filadelfo Oliveira Neto
Preceded by Clóvis Erly Rodrigues	Bishop of Recife (Southern Cone); 2005–2012	Succeeded by Miguel Uchôa
