= Diocese of Tanga =

The Diocese of Tanga may refer to:

- Anglican Diocese of Tanga, in Tanzania
- Roman Catholic Diocese of Tanga, in Tanzania
