= Kikuyu controversy =

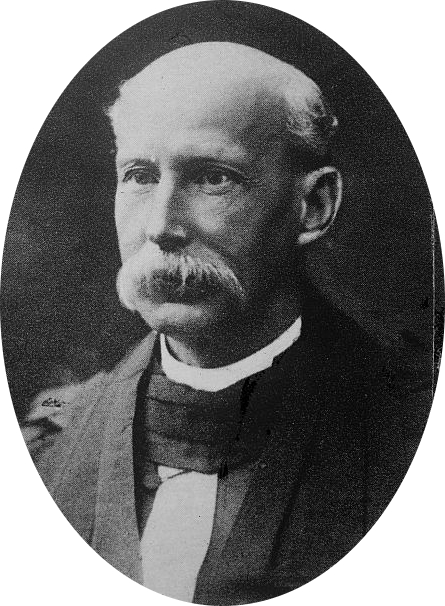
Peel in 1913

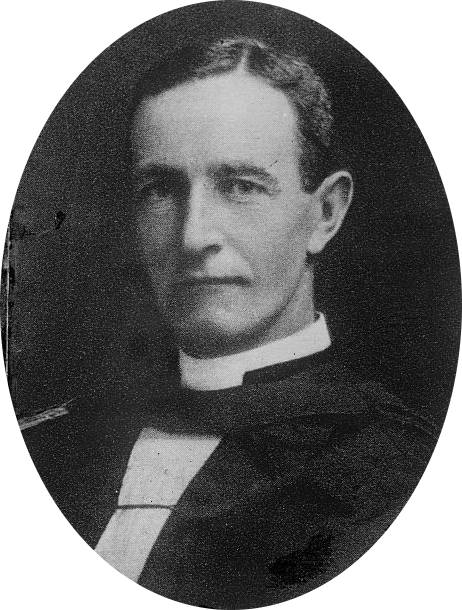
Willis in 1913

The Kikuyu controversy was an Anglican church controversy in 1913 and 1914.

== History ==
In June 1913, William George Peel, the Bishop of Mombasa, and John Jamieson Willis, the Bishop of Uganda, attended an ecumenical communion during an interdenominational missionary conference at the Church of Scotland's parish in Kikuyu, British East Africa, in what is now Kenya. Attending were Anglicans, Methodists, and Presbyterians. Controversy erupted in December after Frank Weston, the Bishop of Zanzibar, denounced Peel and Willis as heretics, and the issue was exhaustively debated in the press for weeks. Ultimately, the two bishops were not tried for heresy for the perceived schism. In April 1915, the Archbishop of Canterbury issued a statement concluding the matter.
