= Maimbo Mndolwa =

Tanzanian Anglican bishop (born 1968)

The Right Reverend Maimbo Mndolwa
- Primate of Tanzania, Bishop of Tanga
- Church: Anglican Church of Tanzania
- See: Tanga
- In office: 4 September 2012-

Orders
- Consecration: 2012 by Valentino Mokiwa

Personal details
- Born: 1968 (age 57–58)

Maimbo William Mndolwa (born 1968) is a Tanzanian Anglican bishop. He is the Bishop of the Diocese of Tanga and was elected Archbishop and Primate of the Anglican Church of Tanzania on 15 February 2018, with his enthronement taking place on 20 May 2018. He is married to Frida.

== Ecclesiastical career ==
Mndolwa served at the Army before becoming an Anglican priest. Mndolwa studied at St. Mark's Theological College, in Dar es Salaam, and at the College of the Transfiguration, in Grahamstown, South Africa. He also studied at the Virginia Theological Seminary, in Alexandria, Virginia, in the United States, where he earned a Post-Graduation Diploma in Theology in 1999. He became a Master of Theology at the Akrofi-Christaller Memorial Center for Mission Research and Applied Theology and a Ph.D. in Theology at the University of KwaZulu Natal, in South Africa. He earned a D.D. at the Virginia Theological Seminary in 2014.

He was consecrated the second Bishop of the Diocese of Tanga at 4 September 2012. He was elected the seventh Archbishop and Primate of the Anglican Church of Tanzania at the Synod held on 15 February 2018. He succeeded Jacob Chimeledya in an enthronement ceremony held at the Cathedral of the Holy Spirit, in Dodoma, on 20 May 2018. He is an Anglo-Catholic.

He was registered to attend GAFCON III, on 17-22 June 2018, but was unable to do so.

Anglican Communion titles
Preceded by Jacob Chimeledya	Primate of the Anglican Church of Tanzania; 2018–present	Incumbent
