= Bishop of Zanzibar =

The Bishop of Zanzibar may refer to:

- Anglican Bishop of Zanzibar, in Tanzania
- Roman Catholic Bishop of Zanzibar
