= Anglican Diocese of Dar es Salaam =

Diocese of Dar es Salaam
- Bishopric
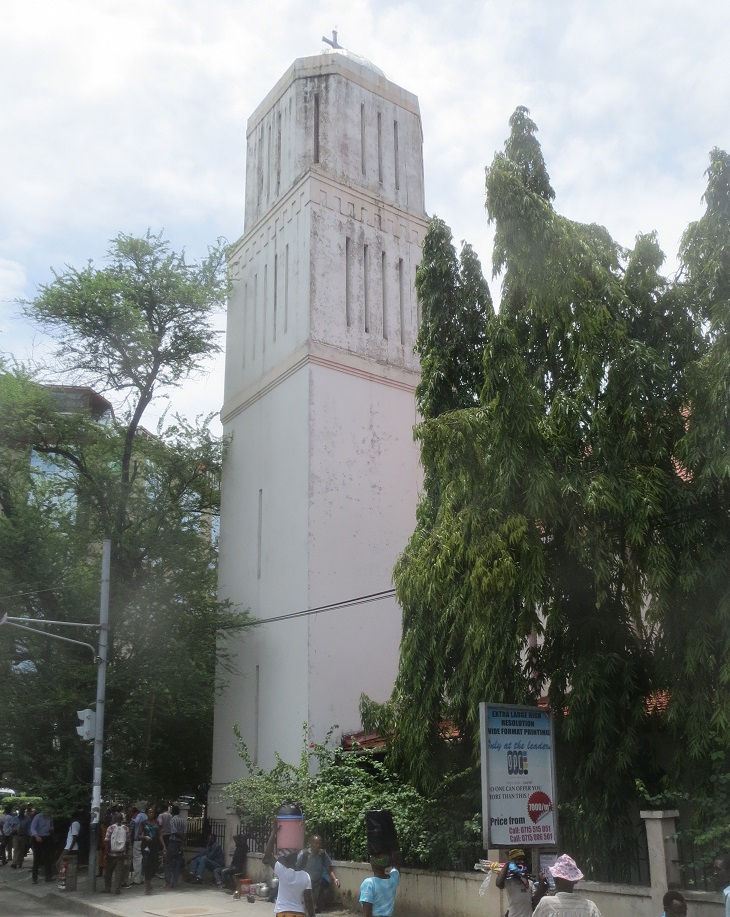
- St. Albans in Daressalaam., Maktaba Street, Anglican Cathedral

Location
- Country: Tanzania
- Coordinates: 6.485516°S 39.1736993°E

Statistics
- Area: 18,000 km^{2} (6,900 sq mi)

Information
- Rite: Anglican
- Archdiocese: Tanzania
- Cathedral: St Albans Cathedral Church

Current leadership
- Parent church: Anglican Church of Tanzania
- Bishop: Right Reverend Jackson Sosthenes

The Diocese of Dar es Salaam is a diocese in the Anglican Church of Tanzania. The current bishop is the Right Reverend Jackson Sosthenes.

== Geography ==
The diocese of Dar es Salaam is the wealthiest diocese in Tanzania. It covers an area of 18,000 square kilometres (6,900 sq mi). It includes the Dar es Salaam and Coast Regions. At its heart is the city of Dar es Salaam, the cultural and economic capital of Tanzania (the political capital is Dodoma). On 11 July 2004 St Albans Cathedral Church became the Cathedral Church of the diocese.

== History ==
Dar es Salaam was formerly within the Diocese of Zanzibar, which in 1963 was renamed the Diocese of Zanzibar and Dar es Salaam. This diocese was split and the new Diocese of Dar-es-Salaam inaugurated on 10 July 1965. John Sepeku had been serving as an assistant bishop of Zanzibar and Dar es Salaam. He was installed as the first diocesan Bishop of Dar es Salaam on the diocese's inauguration The Anglican Church of Tanzania was inaugurated in 1970 after the Province of East Africa was divided into the Province of Kenya and the Province of Tanzania. Sepeku remained bishop of the diocese of Dar es Selaam, retaining office while also Archbishop of Tanzania, until his death in 1983.

On 1 April 1984 the Rt. Rev. Christopher Mlangwa was consecrated as Bishop of Dar-es-Salaam. He was known for his simplicity and charismatic life as well as his unifying influence. He died in 1991 soon after he had to retire due to a 3 year kidney transplant complications. His wife was given a house in Dar es Saalaam to live as had been the custom to give bishops' widows home in the diocese of Dar es Salaam. He left an Arabic-Swahili style 3 bedroom house with an inner courtyard in the busy town of Korogwe in Tanga, which he had bought in his early service as priest in the 1960s. He had given the house to be used by the Diocese of Tanga and Zanzibar by then, to house their priests and any christian. The house was given back to the family upon his death, to which it has been turned into a commercial property by the daughters (Susan Mlangwa - surviving daughter, 2023) Both Sepeku and Mlangwa were from Tanga Region. During his service, he facilitated the study abroad of the then father Valentino Mokiwa (a Mzigua from Tanga) who was elected in 2002., as the fourth Bishop of Dar es Salaam.

Basil Mattiya Sambano was the third bishop, holding office from 1992 to 2001, when he retired. Valentino Mokiwa, a graduate of Virginia Theological Seminary, became bishop of Dar es Salaam in April 2002. He was elected Archbishop of Tanzania on 28 February 2008 and installed on 25 May 2008, replacing Archbishop Donald Leo Mtetemela.

In 2013 there was a hard-fought election for the position of Archbishop of Tanzania. The contestants were the evangelical Jacob Chimeledya and the Anglo-Catholic incumbent archbishop of Tanzania and bishop of Dar es Salaam Valentino Mokiwa. Chimeledya won the election with the support of bishops from the Wagogo tribe. Mokiwa's supporters claimed that the electors had been bribed by foreigners who favored Chimeledya, but eventually Mokiwa accepted the result. Several of the Anglo-Catholic dioceses, including Dar es Salaam, withdrew support for the national church.

In 2016 Chimeledya launched an investigation by the House of Bishops that found that Mokiwa had embezzled funds of his diocese, although Mokiwa claimed he was innocent and the charges had political motivation. On 7 January 2017 Chimeledya deposed Mokiwa. On 2 March 2017 Chimeledya licensed Augustino Ramadhani, a former Chief Justice of Tanzania, as a priest of the Diocese of Mpwapwa and appointed him to lead St Albans Cathedral Church in Dar es Salaam in place of Mokiwa. Ramadhani was episcopal vicar of the diocese until 4 Feb 2018 when the Right Reverend Jackson Sosthenes was consecrated bishop of the diocese. Sosthenes had been educated at the evangelical Trinity School for Ministry in the United States and was seen as a supporter of Archbishop Chimeledya.

== Bishops ==
Bishop	Start	End	Notes
John Sepeku	10 July 1965	November 1983	Died in office
Christopher Mlangwa	1 April 1984	1991	Died shortly after retiring due to kidney transplant complications.
Basil Sambano	1992	2001	Retired
Valentino Mokiwa	April 2002	7 January 2017	Deposed
Augustino Ramadhani	2 March 2017	4 February 2018	Interim (episcopal vicar)
Jackson Sosthenes	4 February 2018		Incumbent

== Sources ==
- "Anaheim Meeting House of Bishops" (PDF), Journal of the General Convention of the Protestant Episcopal Church in the United States of America, p. 110, 27 May 1985
- Conger, George (8 February 2018), "Battle for Dar es Salaam ends with consecration of new bishop", Anglican Ink
- Conger, George (28 April 2020), "Tanzania's Augustino Ramadhani dead", Anglican Ink
- Davies, Matthew (29 May 2008), "TANZANIA: Valentino L. Mokiwa enthroned as primate", The Episcopal Church
- Diocese of Dar es Salaam, The Anglican Church of Tanzania
- "Ex-Primate of Tanzania dies". Church Times. No. 6303. 2 December 1983. p. 3. ISSN 0009-658X – via UK Press Online archives.
- Mndolwa, William Fabian (November 2012), From Anglicanism To African Socialism:The Anglican Church And Ujamaa InTanzania 1955-2005 (PDF) (Thesis), Pietermaritzburg
- "Mrithi wa Mokiwa kusimikwa kesho", The Guardian (in Swahili), IPP Media, 3 February 2018
- "New Diocese of Dar-es-Salaam inaugurated". Church Times. No. 5343. 9 July 1965. p. 8. ISSN 0009-658X – via UK Press Online archives.
- Who's Who in East Africa. Marco Surveys Ltd. 1965. p. 5.
