= Neil Russell =

Neil Russell may refer to:

- Neil Russell (bishop) (1906–1984), Scottish Anglican, served in Zanzibar from 1963 to 1968
- Neil Oliver "Bing" Russell (1926–2003), American actor and baseball club owner
