= Anglican Diocese of Morogoro =

Anglican church in Tanzania

Coordinates: 06°49′27″S 37°39′48″E

The Diocese of Morogoro is an eastern diocese in the Anglican Church of Tanzania: its current bishop is the Right Reverend Godfrey Sehaba.

It allows the ordination of women.
