= Anglican Diocese of Kagera =

The Diocese of Kagera is a diocese in the Anglican Church of Tanzania: its current bishop is the Rt Revd Darlington Bendankeha.

Until 2006, the diocese covered the whole of the Kagera region in north-west Tanzania, bordered by Uganda to the north, Rwanda and Burundi to the west and Lake Victoria to the east. In 2006, the diocese was divided, with the eastern half becoming the Diocese of Lweru. In 2017, the south-east corner became the Diocese of Bihamarulo.

The diocese has been linked with the Diocese of St Edmundsbury and Ipswich in the Church of England since 1994. In July 2024, Bishop Darlington Bendankeha of Kagera, Bishop Godfrey Mbelwe of Lweru, Bishop Vithalis Yusuph of Biharamulo and Bishop Martin Seeley of St Edmundsbury and Ipswich signed a Memorandum of Understanding to ensure the link between all four dioceses is officially recognised and nurtured. In January 2026, all three bishops from the region visited Suffolk for the welcome of the Rt Revd Joanne Grenfell, where they participated in the liturgy of enthronement by anointing her with the oil of chrism.

== Notes ==
1°55′S 31°18′E
