= St Matthew's Church, Westminster =

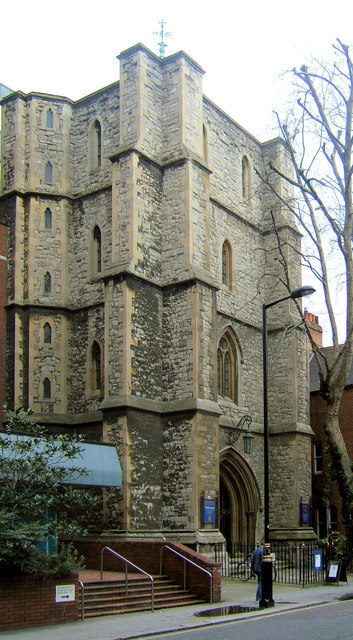

- Location within Central London
- 51°29′49″N 0°7′51″W
- Location: Great Peter Street; London; SW1P 2BU
- Country: England
- Denomination: Church of England
- Churchmanship: Anglo-Catholic
- Website: www.stmw.org

History
- Dedication: Matthew the Apostle

Architecture
- Architect: George Gilbert Scott
- Style: Gothic Revival
- Years built: 1849–1851

Specifications
- Materials: Kentish ragstone, Bath stone dressings

Administration
- Diocese: London
- Deanery: Westminster (St Margaret)

Clergy
- Vicar: Fr Philip Chester

St Matthew's Church, Westminster, is an Anglican church in Westminster, London. Located in the heart of the capital, close to the Houses of Parliament, Westminster Abbey and Church House, St Matthew's has been closely associated with the recovery of the Catholic heritage of the Church of England from its early days. One of the foremost leaders of that movement, Frank Weston, Bishop of Zanzibar, served at St Matthew's from 1896 to 1898.

== History ==
St Matthew's was built between 1849 and 1851 to the design of Sir George Gilbert Scott, assisted by his brother-in-law, George Frederick Bodley. Scott's son John Oldrid Scott designed the clergy house. Subsequently, Sir Ninian Comper added the Lady chapel (approached by the staircase in the Narthex). The interior was greatly enriched by the work of Bodley, Charles Kempe, Walter Ernest Tower and Martin Travers. Kempe and Comper studied under Bodley; Tower was Kempe's partner and Martin Travers was the pupil of Comper. At the time it was built the area was one of the poorer districts of the borough of Westminster.

The church was founded to alleviate the overcrowded St John the Evangelist Church (better known as St John's, Smith Square, which has since been converted into a concert hall, although it remains a consecrated church) in nearby Smith Square. At that time, the new parish was situated in the middle of the notorious Devil's Acre slum and the site was purchased piecemeal at a total cost of about £6,000. This resulted in the "very irregular and unfavourable form" of the L-shaped church building.

The church, except for the Lady Chapel, was almost totally destroyed by fire in May 1977. The new church was dedicated in November 1984 and, while much smaller than the previous church, retains much of its atmosphere as well as some of the original stone-work and many of the contents rescued from the destruction.

It is twinned with the Little Church Around the Corner in New York, where P.G. Wodehouse was married and set many weddings in his writing.

== Architecture and interior ==
Entering the church, via the narthex, visitors will see a stained glass window of St Michael by W. E. Tower. All the stained glass was badly damaged but some of the figures were saved and placed in new settings (most notably the east window and the Annunciation scene in the N.E. window). Here also is Tower's panel of the crucifixion. The 14 Stations of the Cross line the walls and were sculpted by Joseph Cribb, a pupil of Eric Gill. They trace the final journey which Jesus made on the way to his crucifixion and are used as an aid to prayer and meditation.

The Lady Chapel is the earliest example of Comper's work in England, and the 'English altar' with its riddel posts is, he maintained, the first of its type since the Reformation. The Chapel has been completely renovated, and is used every day for Morning and Evening Prayer as well as for weekday masses. There is a statue of Our Lady of Walsingham. Next to the Lady Chapel is the Reconciliation Room, which is used for the hearing of confessions and private discussions.

St Michael's Chapel houses a stone altar by Bodley, and is open every day for private prayer and reflection. Through the iron-work grille, also by Bodley, can be seen the reredos by W. E. Tower, depicting a variety of saints and angels surrounding the scene of the Nativity. On the High Altar is the tabernacle where the Blessed Sacrament is reserved so that Holy Communion is available at any time for those in need. It also acts as a focus for prayer. The altar contains a relic of St Matthew.

Entering the main church one passes a fine Spanish lectern from the 15th century. The modern statue of Our Lady, Queen of Peace, is by Mother Concordia OSB. The other statues are the work of Tower and depict St Edward the Confessor, St George (with dragon), St Michael and St Matthew. The High Altar and reredos were originally under the east window, surrounded by wooden panelling. This panelling was removed after the fire and beneath it was discovered the mosaic mural and painted arcading you see today.

The recent addition of a modern carving of the Madonna and Child maintains the creative link between the church and the arts. It was sculpted by Guy Reid, a former Artist in Residence at St Matthew's.

== Parish school ==
The parish school was opened in 1854 and is next to the church in Old Pye Street. The vicar serves as the chair of governors and the church's pastoral assistants take an active role in the spiritual life of the school.

== Notable clergy ==
- Eric Lionel Mascall, curate
- Ernest Perkins St John, vicar 1935–?
- Frank Weston, curate
- Gerard Irvine, vicar
- Jonathan Aitken, curate

== See also ==
- List of Anglo-Catholic churches
- List of churches in the Diocese of London
