= Dickson Chilongani =

Dickson Chilongani has been Bishop of Central Tanganyika since his consecration at the Cathedral of the Holy Spirit, Dodoma on November 23 2014.

Chilongani was born on 1 January 1966. He was educated at St. Philips Theological College, Kongwa Durham University and the University of Bristol. He has been Principal of Msalato Theological College; Vicar general of the Diocese of Central Tanganyika, a lecturer at Jeonju University in South Korea; and an External Examiner of St. John's University of Tanzania
