= Frank Weston (bishop of Zanzibar) =

Anglican Bishop

The Right Reverend Frank Weston SSC OBE
- Anglican Bishop of Zanzibar
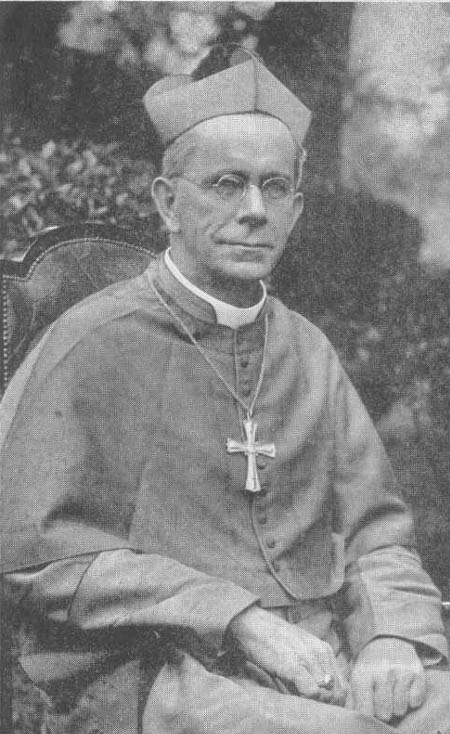
- Diocese: Zanzibar
- In office: 1907–1924
- Predecessor: John Hine
- Successor: Thomas Birley

Orders
- Ordination: 1894 (diaconal); 1895 (presbyteral)
- Consecration: 1908

Personal details
- Born: 13 September 1871 London, England
- Died: 2 November 1924 (aged 53)
- Denomination: Anglican
- Education: Trinity College, Oxford

Frank Weston SSC OBE (1871–1924) was the Anglican Bishop of Zanzibar from 1907 until his death 16 years later.

== Life and ministry ==
Frank Weston was born on 13 September 1871 in South London, the fourth son and fifth child of a tea broker. Born into a clerical family — and his nephew became Frank Weston (Bishop of Knaresborough) — he was educated at Dulwich College and Trinity College, Oxford, where he obtained a first-class honours degree in theology in 1893. He was ordained a deacon by John Festing, Bishop of St Albans, in 1894 and was ordained a priest in 1895. After serving at the Trinity College Mission in Stratford-atte-Bow in the East End of London from 1894 to 1896, he served at St Matthew's, Westminster, from 1896 to 1898. Weston had earlier applied to join the Universities' Mission to Central Africa (UMCA) but had been turned down because of poor health. When Archdeacon Woodward of the UMCA came to stay at St Matthew's he encouraged Weston to apply again, this time his health was good enough for the missions. He was to spend the rest of his life in Zanzibar, where, after initially saying of his command of Swahili that "my grammar is bad and my vocabulary is very poor, but my nerve is immense", he eventually "learned to think in Swahili".

A staunch Anglo-Catholic, Weston was the chaplain and then principal of St Andrew's College, additionally serving as chancellor of Zanzibar Cathedral from 1904 to 1908, before being ordained to the episcopate in 1908. He was consecrated bishop in Southwark Cathedral on 18 October the same year. Under his auspices, a Swahili edition of the Book of Common Prayer for use in Zanzibar was issued in 1919.

Weston delivered the concluding address of the Second Anglo-Catholic Congress of 1923, in which he urged the participants to "Go out and look for Jesus in the ragged, in the naked, in the oppressed and sweated, in those who have lost hope, in those who are struggling to make good. Look for Jesus. And when you see him, gird yourselves with his towel and try to wash their feet."

Weston made the following impression on those who attended the congress at the Royal Albert Hall:

The outstanding personality of the Congress was undoubtedly the Bishop of Zanzibar. To look upon him is to look upon a man. His tall, commanding figure and fine voice added impressiveness to his emphatic diction. He is clear-sighted, resolute, fearless—a leader of men. But he is something more. He is one whose vision is not of the earth earthy, one who habitually seeks the things that are above. Deep-souled earnestness vibrated in every word he spoke. He held that vast audience in the hollow of his hand.

Already known within the church as a man of principle, he was involved in one of the deepest disputes within the Anglican Communion. It stemmed from a conference at Kikuyu where representatives from many Christian churches in East Africa, mainly in the more evangelical Anglican dioceses of Mombasa and Uganda, discussed how to repel the perceived threat from non-Christian groups. The consensus seemed to be that a loose alliance of different groups (Methodist, Presbyterian etc.) was the best way of moving forward, which would have involved measures such as the "exchange of pulpits" and the admission of non-Anglicans to communion in Anglican churches. During the Kikuyu controversy, Weston accused the proponents, such as William Peel, the Bishop of Mombasa, of heresy. A report by the Archbishop's Commission later prohibited Anglicans from receiving Nonconformist sacraments, while stating that it was acceptable in exceptional circumstances for Nonconformists to receive communion in an Anglican church.

Weston wrote two particularly notable pamphlets. "The Black Slaves of Prussia" is an open letter to General Smuts inveighing against proposals to hand territory to the post-war German Empire and the consequences in particular on those who had fought for the British. "The Serfs of Great Britain" was about bad treatment of Africans by the British.

In the First World War, Weston served with distinction during the conflict, being Mentioned in Despatches in 1916 and awarded an OBE for his role as a major commanding the Zanzibar Carrier Corps. The post-war years saw him become increasingly influential and he died on 2 November 1924 (All Souls' Day), aged 53, from a carbuncle. A letter of condolence from "The Native Roman Catholic Christians of Zanzibar" reads

Another of his valuable works was particularly to stand for liberty in opposition to any form of compulsion in the control over native Christians and non-Christians. Therefore we hope and are sure that his Lordship's valuable works and his life's deeds will not be forgotten in our hearts at all. Also, because of his holy life, we are sure, through our Mighty God and our Lord Jesus Christ, his Lordship's soul is at rest in peace before the Holy Trinity in Heaven.

Preaching at Weston's former church on the centenary of his birth, the then Archbishop of Canterbury Michael Ramsey said

But Jesus Christ is the same, yesterday, today, and forever; and for all time his people need the witness of sacrifice, of selflessness, of penitence, and of joy which shone in Frank Weston of Zanzibar. But it would displease him if we tried to be solemn about him. So let the last word be that of a little African boy who said "You know he is a loving man, for his mouth is always opened ready for laughter, for he is still laughing and he will laugh forever."

== Legacy ==
He is seen as the grandfather of the Chama Cha Mariamu Mtakatifu (Community of St Mary of Nazareth and Calvary).

== Works ==
- The Holy Sacrifice: A Short Manual of Worship and Prayer for use at the Holy Communion Service (London: Methuen and Co., 1898)
- Sarufi Ya Kiswahili cha unguja (Zanzibar: Universities Mission Press, 1903)
- Are Missions Needed? Four Answers Given and One Question Asked (London: Universities Mission to Central Africa, 1904)
- The One Christ: An Enquiry into the Manner of the Incarnation (London: Longmans, Green, and Co., 1907)
- Ecclesia Anglicana, for what does she stand? An Open Letter to the Right Rev. Father in God, Edgar, Lord Bishop of St. Albans (Edgar Jacob) (London: Longmans, Green, & Co., 1913)
- In His Will: retreat addresses. London: S.P.C.K., 1922 (privately printed for Community of the Sacred Passion 1914) (see also 1926 & 1930)
- Proposals for a Central Missionary Council of Episcopal and Non-Episcopal Churches in East Africa (London: Longmans, Green, & Co., 1914)
- The One Christ: An Enquiry into the Manner of the Incarnation (London: Longmans, Green & Co., 1914)
- The Case Against Kikuyu: A Study in Vital Principles (London: Longmans, Green, & Co., 1914)
- Kitabu cha Elimu ya Dini, with Samwil Sehoza (Zanzibar: Universities Mission to Central Africa Press, 1914)
- The Fulness of Christ: An Essay (London: Longmans, Green, & Co., 1916)
- The Black Slaves of Prussia: An Open Letter Addressed to General Smuts (London: Universities Mission to Central Africa, 1918).
  - Portuguese: Os Escravos Negros da Prussia (Lisbon: Bureau da Imprensa Britanica, 1918)
- Conquering and to Conquer (London: Society for Promoting Christian Knowledge, 1918)
- God with Us: The Meaning of the Tabernacle (London: Mowbray, 1918)
- The Christ and His Critics: An Open Pastoral Letter to the European Missionaries of His Diocese (London: Mowbray, 1919)
- The Serfs of Great Britain (London: W. Knott, 1920)
- The Revelation of Eternal Love: Christianity Stated in Terms of Love (London: Mowbray, 1920)
- Lambeth and Reunion: An Interpretation of the Mind of the Lambeth Conference of 1920, with Frank Theodore Woods and Martin Linton Smith (London: Society for Promoting Christian Knowledge, 1921).
- In Defence of the English Catholic (London: Mowbray, 1923)
- In His Will: Retreat Addresses (London: Society for Promoting Christian Knowledge, 1922, reprinted 1926)
- School of Sanctity: Retreat Addresses (London: Mowbray, 1926)
- Retreat Addresses (London: Community of the Sacred Passion, 1930)

== Bibliography ==
- Frank Weston, by Christopher Byaruhanga
- Frank, Bishop of Zanzibar, by H. Maynard Smith, 1926, London: SPCK (2nd ed. 1928)
- A short life of Frank Weston, Bishop of Zanzibar, by Dora C. Abdy, SPCK

Church of England titles
Preceded by John Hine	Bishop of Zanzibar; 1907–1924	Succeeded by Thomas Birley
