= Anglican Diocese of Ruvuma =

Coordinates: 10°45′00″S 35°40′00″E

The Anglican Diocese of Ruvuma is a southern diocese in the Anglican Church of Tanzania. Its current bishop is the Right Rev. Raphael Haule.

== History ==
The Anglican Diocese of Ruvuma was established in 1977, and in 1999 Maternus Kapinga served as its first diocesan bishop.

In 2004, the diocese and the Orthodox Anglican Church formalized intercommunion with joint episcopal oversight of a mission in Italy.
