= John Ramadhani =

The Most Reverend John Ramadhani
- Archbishop emeritus of Tanzania
- Church: Anglican Church of Tanzania
- Previous posts: Archbishop of Tanzania; Bishop of Zanzibar and Tanga; Bishop of Zanzibar

Orders
- Ordination: 1971
- Consecration: 1980 by Mussa Kahurananga

Personal details
- Born: 1 August 1932 (age 93) Zanzibar

John Acland Ramadhani (born 1 August 1932 in Zanzibar) is a former Tanzanian Anglican archbishop.

His grandfather was Cecil Majaliwa, the first African Anglican priest of the Universities' Mission to Central Africa. His parents were Matthew Douglas Ramadhani and Bridget Ann Constance Masoud, both teachers. His nephew was Augustino Ramadhani, who became Chief Justice of Tanzania-

Ramadhani completed a degree at the University of East Africa. He also gained degrees in England from Queens College, Birmingham, and the University of Birmingham.

Ramadhani was principal at St. Andrew's Teachers College, in Korogwe, from 1967 to 1969.

Ramadhani was ordained a priest in 1976 at Christ Church, Zanzibar by Mussa Kahurananga. He was warden at St. Mark's Theological College, in Dar es Salaam, from 1977 to 1979.

Ramadhani was bishop of the Diocese of Zanzibar and Tanga, from 1980 to 2001. After the diocese split, he served as interim bishop of Zanzibar until 2002, when Bishop Douglas Toto took office and Ramadhani retired.

Ramadhani was archbishop and primate of the Anglican Church of Tanzania from 1984 to 1998.

Anglican Communion titles
Preceded by Mussa Kahurananga	Primate of the Anglican Church of Tanzania; 1984–1998	Succeeded by Donald Mtetemela
Preceded by Yohana Jumaa	Bishop of Zanzibar and Tanga; 1980–2000	Succeeded by Himself as interim Bishop of Zanzibar
Preceded by Yohana Jumaa	Bishop of Zanzibar and Tanga; 1980–2000	Succeeded by Phillip Baji as Bishop of Tanga
New title	interim Bishop of Zanzibar; 2001–2002	Succeeded by Douglas Toto as Bishop of Zanzibar
