= Mussa Kahurananga =

Mussa Kahurananga was the second archbishop and primate of the Anglican Church of Tanzania, serving from 1979 to 1983.

Kuhurananga was educated at Bishop Tucker College in Mukoro. He was ordained deacon in 1952 and priest in 1953. He worked in the Diocese of Central Tanzania from 1954 to 1962. He was a Canon of Dodoma Cathedral from 1962 to 1963 when he was commissioned as an Assistant Bishop. He was Bishop of West Tanganyika from 1966 to 1983.

He died on 30 September 1997.

Anglican Communion titles
Preceded by John Sepeku	Primate of the Anglican Church of Tanzania; 1979–1983	Succeeded by John Ramadhani
