= Anglican Bishop of Zanzibar =

Coordinates: 6°08′S 39°19′E

The Bishop of Zanzibar is the Diocesan of an island diocese in the Anglican Church of Tanzania. Its current bishop is Michael Hafidh. The bishop's seat is Christ Church, Zanzibar, the Anglican cathedral in Stone Town, Zanzibar, Tanzania.

== Bishops ==
Bishops of Zanzibar

- 1892 – 7 May 1894 (d.): Charles Smythies (previously Bishop in Central Africa until that See was split)
- 1895 – 1901 (res.): William Richardson
- 1901 – 1908 (res.): John Hine (translated from Likoma and to Northern Rhodesia
- 18 October 1908 – 2 November 1924 (d.): Frank Weston
- 1925 – 1943 (res.): Thomas Birley
- 1943 – 1963: Bill Baker (diocese renamed in 1963 and 1965)

Though the diocese was renamed "Zanzibar and Dar es Salaam" in 1963, the creation of separate dioceses for Dar es Salaam and for Tanga was already planned. When the Diocese of Dar es Salaam was erected in 1965, this remaining diocese was renamed "Zanzibar and Tanga".

Bishops of Zanzibar and Tanga

- 1963 – 1968 (res.): Bill Baker (Bishop of Zanzibar and Dar es Salaam, 1963–1965; Bishop of Zanzibar and Tanga thereafter; became Assistant Bishop of Liverpool)
- 1968–1980: Yohana Jumaa (consecrated 25 April 1968, by Neil Russell, assistant bishop, at Korogwe)
- 1980 – 2001 (ret.): John Ramadhani

Bishops of Zanzibar

- 2002 – 9 February 2006 (d.): Douglas Toto (Douglas Mathew Toto; consecrated 24 August 2002; died in post)
- 2006 – 2012: vacancy in See
  - 2006 – 2010: Matthew Mhagama, Vicar-General
  - 2010 – 2012: Michael Hafidh, Vicar-General
- 2012 – present: Michael Hafidh (consecrated 15 April 2012, by Valentino Mokiwa, Archbishop of Tanzania)

=== Assistant bishops ===
On 24 March 1963, three men were consecrated bishops, to serve the diocese in anticipation of a planned three-way split:

- 1963–1965: John Sepeku, assistant bishop in Dar-es-Salaam, became first bishop of the Diocese of Dar es Salaam on 10 July 1965.
- 1963–?: Yohana Lukindo, assistant bishop for the Tanga Region, was born 1921, ordained in 1953 and served as Archdeacon of Korogwe, 1961–63.
- 1963 – 1968 (ret.): Robert Neil Russell (called Neil; died 9 May 1984, Tanzania, aged 78) went to Southern Rhodesia as a missionary in 1933 and later to Tanga. He was consecrated a bishop in March 1963, to serve as an assistant bishop based on Zanzibar Island (Unguja). He retired to his native Scotland in 1968 and joined the Community of the Transfiguration (Scotland), taking charge of Rosslyn Chapel while also serving as an Assistant Bishop of Edinburgh. He returned to Tanzania in 1982 and later died there.
