= Given Gaula =

Economic survivor

Given Gaula is the current Bishop of Kondoa.

Gaula was educated at the Virginia Theological Seminary and has a PhD in theology from the University of Auckland. The title of his 2012 doctoral thesis was The Gospel of Luke as a model for mission in an African context: With special reference to the challenges of mission in the Anglican Church of Tanzania. His wife Lilian is also an Anglican priest.
