= Anglican Diocese of Lweru =

The Diocese of Lweru is a diocese in the Anglican Church of Tanzania: the current bishop is Godfrey Mbelwa.
