= Anglican Diocese of Victoria Nyanza =

Coordinates: 1°S 33°E

The Diocese of Victoria Nyanza is a northern diocese in the Anglican Church of Tanzania: The diocese of Victoria Nyanza (D.V.N) is one of the 28 dioceses of the Anglican Church in Tanzania. The diocese was established on 13 March 1963, under the Rev. Bishop Maxwell Wiggins, a missionary of the (C.M.S.) missionary from New land, as the first diocesan bishop to server in that capacity until 1976 when he retired and returned to News land. At that time the "Diocese was offering its services in the region around Lake Victoria, and was given the title of Lake Victoria (Victoria Nyanza). Prior to its inauguration it was under the auspice of the Diocese of Central Tanganyika (D.C.T) and because the first diocese from Central Tanganyika which included all the regions of central region, the Northern region, the western region and the Lake Victoria region" . By that time Diocese of Victoria Nyanza merged four Regions which were Mwanza region, Mara Region, Shinyanga Region and Kagera Region then the diocese headquarters were in Mwanza, as it was centrally located and easily accessible, although most believers were in the Kagera region. In 1976, Bishop Maxwell Wiggins ended his term and the sought citizen’s Bishop. 27 June 1976 after his retirement he was succeeded by Rev. Bishop John Rusibamayila who presided from 27 June 1976 to May 1991. However during the leadership of Bishop Rusibamayila, the church entered into a leadership challenge and this was due to the geography of Bishopric. It was necessary to divide the Diocese into three deaneries, namely Mwanza Deaneries (Sukuma land), Mara Deanery (North Mara and South Mara).

During the time of Bishop Rusibamayila the church ministry grew and led to the ides of the division of the Diocese, and therefore the idea was accepted and began the electoral process leading to the birth of the two following Diocese, Diocese of Kagera and Mara. The Diocese of Mara elected Re. Garson Nyaronga as the first Bishop, and was consecrated on 18 August 1985. The Diocese of Kagera elected Rev. Ruhuza as their first Bishop. The Diocese of Kagera was officially inaugurated on 11 August 1985. The Diocese of Victoria Nyanza remained with two regions of Mwanza and Shinyanga. Thus the Diocese of Victoria Nyanza is the mother Diocese of the Diocese of Mara, Shinyanga and Kagera. Bishop Rusibamayila continued to be Bishop of Victoria Nyanza until his death in 1991; He died on 16 May 1991 and was buried inside a cathedral of St. Nicholas Nyamagana Mwanza. Shinyanga Region was under the Diocese of Victoria Nyanza and after a while Shinyanga also became a Diocese.

The third phase Bishop was later elected Bishop John Changae who led the Diocese of Victoria Nyanza from 1991-2007. During his tenure he faces many leadership challenges and to the emergence in 2007 it led to his retirement, and in 2009 he died. He was taken away to be laid in Tanga for burial. Before his retirement the Diocese was under the supervision of Archbishop Donald Leo Mtetemela himself for several months. In 2007 Rev. "Boniface was elected and consecrated on 18th, November 2007. Bishop Kwangu (the forth Bishop) led that Diocese up to 2017. Bishop Kwangu went into retirement on 10 December 2017, while Bishop Godfrey Mbelwa of Diocese of Rwelu Become the patron of the Diocese" When he continued to support in the Diocese the process of electing the fifth Bishop and the names were proposed and sent to the Bishop house in Dodoma, the Bishops investigated and sent the diocese to be voted on. A dispute arose that some names were not eligible of being voted and it was decided that the election should be canceled. After the cancelation, the House of Bishops’ decided that the Diocese should be patronized by the Archbishop himself". On 22 August 2019 under the leadership of Maimbo Fabian William Mdolwa, the archbishop started the process of finding the fifth Bishop. Rev. Zephania Amos Ntunza was consecrated as the fifth Bishop of the Diocese of Victoria Nyanza. Now the Diocese has four Archdeaconries; Mwanza City Archdeaconry, Sengerema Archdeaconry, Magu Archdeaconry and Geita Archdeaconry. Its current bishop is the Rt Revd Zephania Amosi Ntuza.
