= Anglican Diocese of Ruaha =

Coordinates: 07°46′57″S 35°41′59″E

The Diocese of Ruaha is a central diocese in the Anglican Church of Tanzania: its current bishop is the Right Rev. Joseph Mgomi.
