= Anglican Diocese of Biharamulo =

The Diocese of Biharamulo is a diocese in the Anglican Church of Tanzania: the current bishop is Yusuph Vithalis.
