= William Peel =

William Peel may refer to:

- Sir William Peel (Royal Navy officer) (1824–1858), Royal Navy officer and recipient of the Victoria Cross in the Crimean War
- William Peel (bishop) (1854–1916), Anglican bishop in Africa
- Sir William Peel (colonial administrator) (1875–1945), British Chief Secretary of the Federated Malay States and Governor of Hong Kong
- William Peel, 1st Earl Peel (1867–1937), British politician
- William Peel, 3rd Earl Peel (born 1947), cross-bench (non-party) member of the House of Lords and Lord Chamberlain of the Royal Household
- William Yates Peel (1789–1858), British Tory politician
- William Peel (whisky), Blended Scotch whisky brand.
