= Anglican Diocese of Rift Valley =

Coordinates: 3.0000°S 35.5000°E

The Diocese of Rift Valley is a central diocese in the Anglican Church of Tanzania: its current bishop is the Rt Rev John Daudi Lupaa.

It allows the ordination of women.
