= Anglican Diocese of Southern Highlands =

Diocese of the Anglican Church of Tanzania

Coordinates: 9.1667°S 34.5167°E

The Diocese of Southern Highlands is a south-western diocese in the Anglican Church of Tanzania: its current bishop is the Rt Revd Julius Lugendo.
