= John Willis (bishop) =

Anglican bishop of Uganda (1912-1934)

- Bishop of Uganda
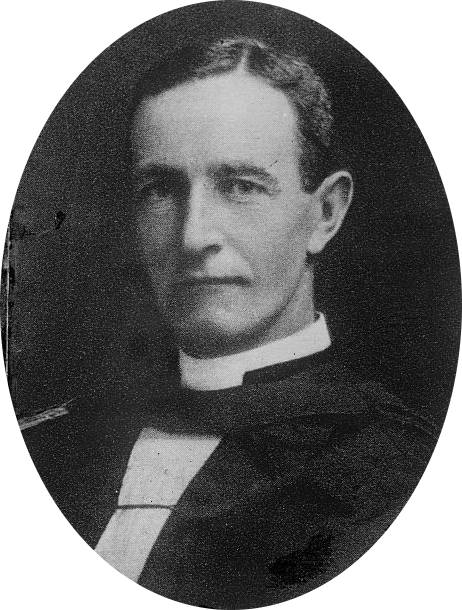
- John Willis, photographed c. 1910–15
- Diocese: Diocese of Uganda
- In office: 1912–1934
- Predecessor: Alfred Tucker
- Successor: Cyril Stuart
- Other post: assistant bishop in Leicester

Personal details
- Born: 8 January 1872
- Died: 12 November 1954 (aged 82)

John Jamieson Willis CBE (8th November 1872 – 12th November 1954) was an Anglican bishop, Bishop of Uganda from 1912 to 1934 and subsequently Assistant Bishop of Leicester. He and William George Peel, Bishop of Mombasa, were accused of heresy during the Kikuyu controversy.

== Biography ==
Born on 8th November 1872, the second son of Sir William Willis, Accountant-General of the Navy, and great-grandson of Joseph Tucker, Surveyor of the Navy, Willis was educated at Haileybury and Pembroke College, Cambridge, where he took a Bachelor of Arts (BA) in 1894, Cambridge Master of Arts (MA Cantab) in 1899, and Doctor of Divinity (DD) in 1912.

== Profession ==
He was ordained in 1895 and began his career with a curacy in Great Yarmouth. He was then appointed under the CMS to Ankole, Uganda and later transferred to Entebbe where he served as Chaplain to the English Community. He opened up a new mission station in Kavirondo eventually becoming Archdeacon of Kavirondo before his appointment to the episcopate in 1912. In 1934 he returned to England to be Assistant Bishop of Leicester. He died on 12th November 1954.

Anglican Communion titles
Preceded by Alfred Tucker	Bishop of Uganda; 1912–1934	Succeeded by Cyril Stuart
