= Anglican Diocese of Newala =

Coordinates: 10°40′S 39°00′E

The Diocese of Newala is a south-eastern diocese in the Anglican Church of Tanzania: its current bishop is the Rt Rev Oscar Mnung'a.
