= Marinez Santos Bassotto =

Brazilian Anglican bishop (born 1970)

The Most Reverend Marinez Rosa Dos Santos Bassotto
- Primate of Brazil and Bishop of the Amazon
- Church: Igreja Episcopal Anglicana do Brasil
- Diocese: Anglican Diocese of the Amazon
- Elected: 20 January 2018
- Predecessor: Naudal Gomes
- Other post: Bishop of the Amazon

Orders
- Ordination: May 1995 (deacon); 1996 (priest)
- Consecration: 2023

Personal details
- Born: 1971 or 1972 (age 54–55) Canguçu, Brazil
- Denomination: Anglican
- Spouse: Paulo Bassotto

Marinez Rosa dos Santos Bassotto (born 1971 or 1972) is a Brazilian Anglican archbishop and primate of the Anglican Episcopal Church of Brazil (IEAB). She was the first female primate of the Anglican church in Latin America.

Bassotto was born in Canguçu, Brazil. She was ordained as deacon in 1995 after studying at the IEAB's seminary in Porto Alegre.

In January 2024, Bishop Bassotto took part in a "Growing Together" ecumenical summit that took place in Rome and Canterbury as a part of the Week for Prayer for Christian Unity. Bishop Alba Sally Sue Hernández of the Diocese of Mexico in the Anglican Church of Mexico also took part in the meeting where the two women bishops from Latin America were among 27 pairs of bishops blessed by Pope Francis and the Archbishop of Canterbury Justin Welby.
