= Anglican Diocese of Rorya =

Coordinates: 01°15′S 034°09′E

The Diocese of Rorya is a northern diocese in the Anglican Church of Tanzania: its current bishop is the Right Rev. John Adiema.
