= Anglican Diocese of Tabora =

Diocese in Tanzania

Coordinates: 5°1′S 32°48′E

The Diocese of Tabora is a central diocese in the Anglican Church of Tanzania: its current bishop is the Rt Revd Elias Chakupewa.

In 2024 the diocese voted to allow the ordination of women priests.
