= Cyril Stuart =

Simon Cyril Edgar Stuart (27 November 1892 – 23 August 1982) was Bishop of Uganda from 1932 to 1952 before returning to England to be Assistant Bishop of Worcester.

== Early life ==
Born on 27 November 1892, Stuart was educated at Repton School, then an all-boys private school in Repton, Derbyshire. He went on to study at St John's College, Cambridge.

== Career ==
=== Military service ===
Stuart served in the British Army during World War I. On 9 May 1915, he was commissioned into the North Staffordshire Regiment as a second lieutenant (on probation). While serving with the Suffolk Regiment, he was promoted to lieutenant on 27 March 1916. He was officer commanding of a company in the Hampshire Regiment with the acting rank of captain from 20 February 1918 to 9 May 1918. He resigned his commission on 11 February 1920.

=== Religious career ===
He was ordained in 1920 and began his career with a curacy at St Mary's, Hornsey Rise. Following this, he was chaplain and lecturer at Ridley Hall, Cambridge before a long period of service in Africa. From 1925, he was chaplain and librarian of Achimota College and then a Church Mission Society missionary in Uganda. He was consecrated a bishop by Cosmo Lang, Archbishop of Canterbury, at Lambeth Palace Chapel in 1932. After two years as an assistant bishop he was elevated to the full Episcopate in 1934.

In 1952, he returned to England as an Assistant Bishop of Worcester and Rector of St Andrew's, Worcester. Four years later, on 19 October 1956, he was appointed a residentiary canon of Worcester Cathedral; he retired in April 1966.

He died on 23 August 1982. His memoirs are stored within the National Archives Bishop Stuart University is named after him.

Church of England titles
Preceded by John Willis	Bishop of Uganda; 1934–1952	Succeeded by Leslie Brown
