= Anglican Diocese of Tarime =

Coordinates: 01°21′S 34°23′E

The Diocese of Tarime is a north-western diocese in the Anglican Church of Tanzania: its current bishop is the Right Rev. Mwita Akiri.
