= Anglican Church in Brazil =

GAFCON-affiliated church

- Igreja Anglicana no Brasil
- Classification: Christian
- Orientation: Anglican
- Theology: Evangelical Anglicanism
- Governance: Episcopal
- Primate: Miguel Uchôa
- Associations: GAFCON, Global South
- Origin: 2018
- Separated from: Anglican Episcopal Church of Brazil

The Anglican Church in Brazil (Portuguese: Igreja Anglicana no Brasil) is an evangelical Anglican denomination in Brazil. It is not a member of the Anglican Communion, but is in full communion with other provinces of the Global Fellowship of Confessing Anglicans and the Global South Fellowship of Anglican Churches.

== History ==
The church had its origin in a 2005 split in which the Diocese of Recife, led by Robinson Cavalcanti, left the Anglican Episcopal Church of Brazil, because it had rejected the official Anglican stance on homosexuality, expressed at the Lambeth 1.10 Resolution in 1998.

The Diocese of Recife organized in the Anglican Church-Diocese of Recife and became associated to the Global South, as an extraprovincial diocese, and the Global Anglican Future Conference. At the same time they started church planting outside their territory, aiming to start a new conservative Anglican province in Brazil.

On 12 May 2018 the Anglican Church in Brazil was constituted as a province, with three dioceses, 54 communities, and Miguel Uchôa as the first Archbishop and Primate. It is not recognised as a member of the Anglican Communion, but has been described as the "41st province in the Anglican Communion" by the conservative grouping Global Anglican Future Conference (GAFCON).

Archbishop Peter Jensen argues that the division was "not over a matter of church politics or personal ambition" but was "a matter of the fundamentals of the faith, of what makes a true church, of the authority of God's word."

== Dioceses ==
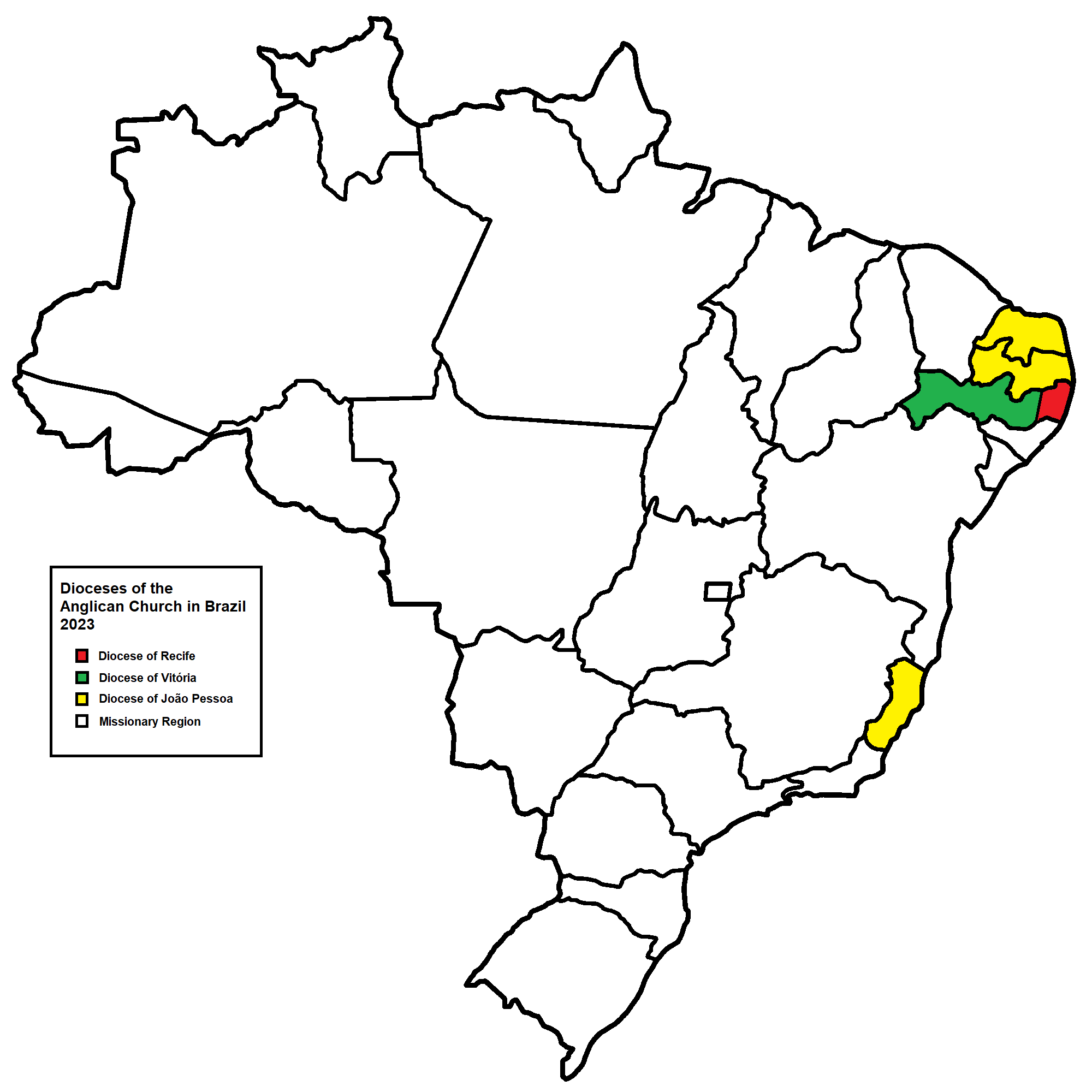
Map of dioceses of the Anglican Church in Brazil, 2023

The church is organized in three dioceses and a missionary region.

Diocese	Territory	Cathedral	See city	Bishop(s)	Number of congregations (2023)
Recife	Pernambuco (coastal region)	Anglican Parish of the Holy Spirit	Recife	Miguel Uchôa (diocesan); Flavio Adair, Evilásio Tenorio (assistant)	17
Vitória	Pernambuco (agreste and sertão regions)	Cathedral of the Resurrection	Vitória de Santo Antão	Márcio Simões	10
João Pessoa	Paraíba, Rio Grande do Norte, Espírito Santo	Cathedral of the Anglican Communion	João Pessoa	Márcio Meira (diocesan); Miguel Neto, Eric Rodrigues (assistant)	34
Missionary Region	Non-diocesan areas of Brazil, northern South America and Central America	None	None	Flavio Adair	N/A

== Relations with other churches ==
The Anglican Church in Brazil has broken any ties with the liberal Anglican Episcopal Church of Brazil. It is in full communion with all the Global South (Anglican) and the Global Anglican Future Conference provinces, including those who are not members of the Anglican Communion, such as the Anglican Church in North America. The province is also a member of the Rede Inspire (Inspire Net), an association of around 400 churches in Brazil.

The Anglican Church in Brazil was represented at GAFCON III, held in Jerusalem, on 17–22 June 2018, by a 15-member delegation, including Primate Miguel Uchôa.
