= Thomas Birley =

Birley in 1925.

Thomas Howard Birley (11 December 1865 – 1949) was Anglican Bishop of Zanzibar from 1925 until 1943. He was educated at Radley and Christ Church, Oxford and ordained in 1889 after a period of study at Ripon College Cuddesdon. He was Curate of St Saviour, Roath then Vicar of St Thomas the Martyr, Oxford. He was at the UMCA Mission at Korogwe from 1908 to 1911 and Archdeacon of Zigualand until 1925. He returned to England and became Chaplain to the St Giles Homes and Community of Sacred Passion at East Hanningfield. He died on 31 March 1949.

Church of England titles
Preceded by Frank Weston	Bishop of Zanzibar; 1925–1943	Succeeded by William Scott Baker
