= John Sepeku =

John Thomas Mhina Sepeku (1908 – November 1983) was the inaugural archbishop and primate of the Anglican Church of Tanzania, serving from 5 July 1970 until his resignation (in ill-health) effective 1 September 1978.

Sepeku was educated at Hegono Theological College. He was ordained deacon in 1938 and priest in 1939. He worked in the Diocese of Central Tanganyika from 1938 to 1960. He was Archdeacon of Magila from 1960 to 1963. He was consecrated a bishop on 24 March 1963, serving as an assistant bishop of Zanzibar and Dar es Salaam — he lived in Dar es Salaam — until that diocese was split. He was installed as the first diocesan Bishop of Dar es Salaam on the diocese's inauguration (10 July 1965) and remained bishop of that diocese (even while also Archbishop & Primate) until his death in 1983.

Anglican Communion titles
New title	Bishop of Dar es Salaam; 1965–1983	Succeeded by
New title	Archbishop of Tanzania; 1970–1978	Succeeded by Mussa Kahurananga
