= Anglican Diocese of Lake Rukwa =

Coordinates: 8°00′S 32°25′E

The Diocese of Lake Rukwa is a south-western diocese in the Anglican Church of Tanzania: its current bishop is the Right Rev. Ephraim Ntikabuze whose seat is at the Christ the King Cathedral in Mpanda. The previous bishop, the Right Rev. Mathayo Kasagara, retired in March 2023.
