= Anglican Diocese of Shinyanga =

Coordinates: 03°39′43″S 33°25′23″E

The Diocese of Shinyanga is a northern diocese in the Anglican Church of Tanzania: its current bishop is the Right Rev. Johnson Chinyong'ole.
