= Anglican Diocese of Mara =

Coordinates: 1°30′50″S 33°55′56″E

The Diocese of Mara is a diocese in the Anglican Church of Tanzania: its current bishop is the Right Reverend George Okoth.

It allows the ordination of women.
