= Anglican Diocese of Kiteto =

Coordinates: 5.867°S 36.849°E

The Diocese of Kiteto is a northern diocese in the Anglican Church of Tanzania: its current bishop is the Right Rev. Isaiah Chambala.

It allows the ordination of women.
