= Anglican Diocese of Kondoa =

Division of the Tanzanian Anglican Church

Coordinates: 4°54′0″S 35°46′12″E

The Diocese of Central Kondoa is a diocese in the Anglican Church of Tanzania: its current bishop is the Right Reverend Given Gaula.

It allows the ordination of women.
