= Anglican Diocese of Tanga =

Anglican diocese in Tanzania

Coordinates: 5°04′S 39°06′E

The Diocese of Tanga is a north-eastern diocese in the Anglican Church of Tanzania: its current bishop is the Right Rev. Dr. Maimbo Mndolwa.
