= Anglican Diocese of Western Tanganyika =

The Diocese of Western Tanganyika is a diocese in the Anglican Church of Tanzania: its current bishop is the Right Reverend Emanuel C. Bwatta.
