= Anglican Diocese of Central Tanganyika =

The Diocese of Central Tanganyika is a diocese in the Anglican Church of Tanzania. Its current bishop is the Right Reverend Dr. Dickson Chilongani.

It allows the ordination of women.
