= Anglican Episcopal Church of Brazil =

Church organization in Brazil

- Igreja Episcopal Anglicana do Brasil
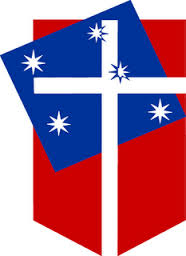
- Classification: Protestant
- Orientation: Anglican
- Scripture: Holy Bible
- Theology: Anglican doctrine
- Polity: Episcopal
- Primate: Marinez Santos Bassotto
- Associations: Anglican Communion
- Headquarters: Praça Olavo Bilac, 63, Campos Elíseos, São Paulo
- Territory: Brazil
- Branched from: The Episcopal Church in the United States
- Separations: Anglican Church in Brazil (2005)
- Members: 120,000
- Official website: ieab.org.br

The Anglican Episcopal Church of Brazil (Portuguese: Igreja Episcopal Anglicana do Brasil – IEAB) is the 19th province of the Anglican Communion, covering the country of Brazil. It is composed of nine dioceses and one missionary district, each headed by a bishop, among whom one is elected as the Primate of Brazil. The current Primate is Marinez Rosa dos Santos Bassotto. IEAB is the oldest non-Catholic church in Brazil, originating from the Treaty of Commerce and Navigation signed in 1810 between Portugal and the United Kingdom which allowed the Church of England to establish chapels in the former Portuguese colony. In 1890 American missionaries from the Episcopal Church established themselves in the country aiming to create a national church; unlike the English chapels, they celebrated services in Portuguese and converted Brazilians. The Anglican community of Brazil was a missionary district of the Episcopal Church until 1965, when it gained its ecclesiastical independence and became a separate province of the Anglican Communion. Twenty years later, IEAB began to ordain women. It preaches a social gospel, being known for its commitment to fight against problems that affect vast portions of the Brazilian society, such as social inequality, land concentration, domestic violence, racism, homophobia and xenophobia. Its stance as an Inclusive Church has caused both schisms and the arrival of former Catholics and Evangelicals in search of acceptance.

== History ==
Anglicanism, as a distinctive Christian tradition, began to develop from 1534 when Henry VIII of England, driven by political and personal concerns, proclaimed the independence of the Church of England from the Holy See, rejecting papal authority. The church claims itself as a continuation of the primitive church, since it has not rejected the Catholic and Apostolic faith. Anglicanism soon spread to the British colonies in the New World. In Brazil, however, the official religion imposed by the Portuguese settlers was Catholicism and the early attempts by Protestant missionaries – French Huguenots and Dutch Calvinists – failed. The first Anglican to set foot in Brazil was Henry Martin in 1805. His ship made a stop in Salvador on its route to India. He remained in the city for two weeks and communicated with Catholic priests in French and Latin. He wrote the following about his impressions of the country: "What happy missionary shall be sent to bear the name of Christ to these western regions? When shall this beautiful country be delivered from idolatry and spurious Christianity? Crosses there are in abundance, but when shall the doctrine of the Cross be held up?"

In 1810, Portugal and the United Kingdom signed the Treaty of Commerce and Navigation, which allowed the Church of England to build chapels in Brazil. These were the first non-Catholic chapels in the country, intended exclusively for the attendance of Anglo-Brazilians. Nevertheless, under the terms of the treaty, these chapels could not resemble religious temples and its Masses could only be celebrated in English. The first Anglican Mass was celebrated later that year. In 1819, the first Anglican chapel, Christ Church, was established in Rio de Janeiro. According to Silva, the early Anglican community did not oppose the status quo; he points out that some Anglicans owned slaves, despite the Church of England's opposition to the slave trade. After the Independence, the first missionary activity began. In 1853, William Cooper was sent to Brazil at the request of an Episcopalian from Rio de Janeiro, probably a member of the American colony. Nevertheless, his ship sank at the Caribbean Sea and he returned to the United States.

In 1860 a Scottish priest, the Reverend Richard Holden, landed in Belém. He was also sent by the Episcopal Church to do missionary work. Holden conducted the most successful mission, remaining in the country for 12 years. He chose Belém as his work post due to the existence of a Bibles distribution station in the city and his expectation that the Amazon River would be open to international navigation. In Belém, he tried to create an Anglican community, but was not successful. He used the local media to spread the church, writing newspaper articles that provoked the wrath of the Catholic bishop, Antônio de Macedo Costa. Holden was responsible for the first Portuguese translation of the Book of Common Prayer; he also wrote a dozen hymns — two of them featured in the 1962 hymnal. He traveled the tributary rivers of the Amazon to sell Bibles in riverside communities. In 1862, he moved to Salvador, where he also tried to spread Anglicanism through the press. His articles encountered strong opposition and he survived three assassination attempts. His strong personality and controversial preaching style also provoked opposition from the Episcopal Church, which had sponsored his trip to Brazil (although it was also in disarray due to the American Civil War and defeated Confederates would soon arrive in Brazil with their slaves). In 1864, Rev. Holden accepted the invitation of Presbyterian Robert Kalley to become a minister in the Fluminense Congregational Church in Rio de Janeiro. He later abandoned Anglicanism and became a Dispensationalist.

Anglican missions in Brazil began to flourish after 1889, when the Republic was proclaimed and the country became officially secular; this decriminalized the conversion of Catholics to Anglicanism and other churches and religions. In 1890, the priests Lucien Lee Kinsolving and James Watson Morris were sent to Brazil from the Virginia Theological Seminary. They established themselves in a rented house later known as the Mission House (Casa da Missão) in Porto Alegre, where they held the first Anglican Mass in Portuguese on 1 June 1890. Three other American missionaries followed in 1891: Rev. William Cabell Brown (who would leave in 1914 to become bishop in his native Virginia, but after completing translations of the Bible and Book of Common Prayer), Rev. John Gaw Meem and lay woman Mary Packard. They established missions in Santa Rita do Rio dos Sinos, Rio Grande and Pelotas. These five missionaries are regarded as the founders of the Brazilian Episcopal Church, since they preached to Brazilians in Portuguese and spread Anglicanism throughout the Southern region of Brazil, which now has the largest number of Anglican communities.

In 1893, Morris and Brown launched the Christian Standard (Estandarte Cristão), a newspaper for the Anglican community of Porto Alegre. That same year, Bishop George William Peterkin of West Virginia visited the Brazilian mission and ordained four deacons. Four years later, the Brazilian mission was visited by Waite Hockin Stirling, who ordained three priests and confirmed 159 members.

In 1899, Kinsolving became a bishop, leading the Brazilian community. In 1907, the missionary efforts resulted in the creation of the Missionary District of Brazil within the Episcopal Church. In 1908, the missionaries began their activities in Rio de Janeiro, then capital of Brazil, where Kinsolving hoped to build the headquarters of the church. Four years later, the Anglicans opened schools in Porto Alegre and Santana do Livramento. In 1921, the missionaries began working in the State of São Paulo, reaching the state capital in 1924. In 1926, William M. M. Thomas was elected Bishop of the Missionary District of Brazil and Kinsolving returned to the United States a year later. In 1929, the Episcopal Press was founded; it launched the most important revised edition of the Book of Common Prayer. According to Kickhofel, the Anglican worship service was envied by the Catholics, since they only began praying in Portuguese after the end of the Second Vatican Council in 1965.

In 1940, Athalicio Theodoro Pithan became the first Brazilian-born bishop of the missionary district; Episcopalians celebrated the 40th year of their presence in Brazil that same year. In 1949, the year of bishop Thomas' retirement and succession by Louis Chester Melcher, the Missionary District of Brazil was sub-divided into three dioceses, which prompted discussions about the ecclesiastical independence of the Episcopal Church Brazilian.

In 1952, the first General Synod took place. Three years later, the chapels which were founded in the 1820s and were still being operated by the Church of England merged with the Missionary District of Brazil after a deal reached by the Episcopal Church and the Church of England. In 1965, the Anglican Episcopal Church of Brazil (Igreja Episcopal Anglicana do Brasil; IEAB) gained its autonomy, becoming the 19th ecclesiastical province of the Anglican Communion and electing Egmont Machado Krischke, son of an early missionary, as its Primate Bishop. Since then, the Anglican Episcopal Church has had the autonomy to develop its own liturgy. In 1966, IEAB became a member of the World Council of Churches as part of its commitment to Christian ecumenism. In 1974, the Brazilian province was visited, for the first time, by an Archbishop of Canterbury, Michael Ramsey. IEAB achieved financial independence from the Episcopal Church in the late 1970s.

In 1985, IEAB began to ordain women following the decision of the 1984 General Synod; the first female priest was the Reverend Carmen Etel Alves Gomes. IEAB preceded the Church of England on the matter. In 1990, during its centenary, IEAB decided to focus on three areas, considering the social-economic problems of Brazil: education, service and expansion. That same year, the Primate Bishop of IEAB and the Presiding Bishop of the Episcopal Church established a bilateral committee with the purpose of reapproaching the churches, encouraging partnerships and mutual relations between them. The Episcopal Church still sends missionaries to Brazil and the dioceses of Pennsylvania and São Paulo and Indianapolis and Brasília maintain special relations. In addition, IEAB initiated a dialogue with the Anglican churches from other Portuguese-speaking countries.

== Presiding Bishop ==
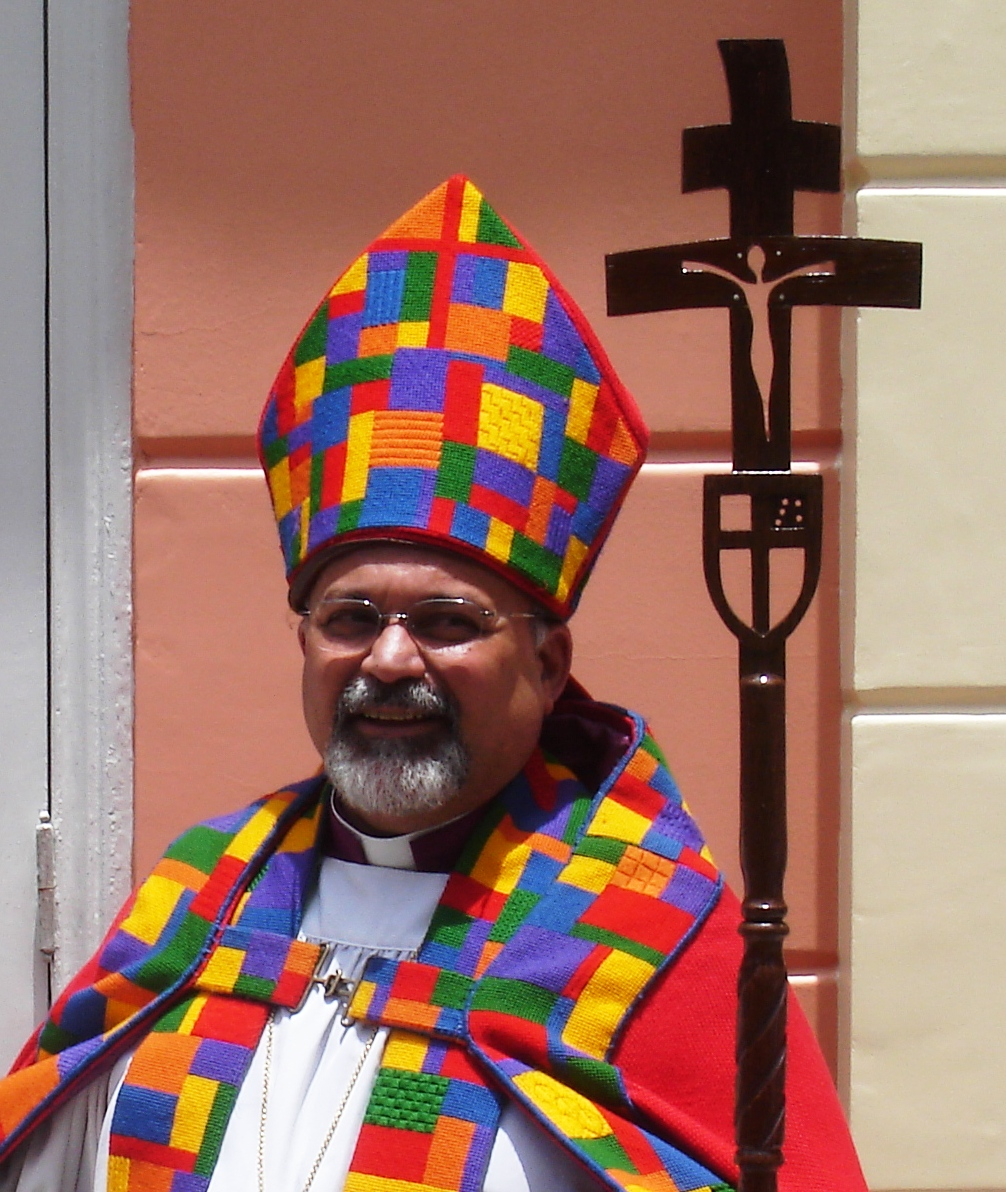
Maurício José Araújo de Andrade, Primate Bishop of the Anglican Episcopal Church of Brazil from 2006 to 2013

Originally under the metropolitical supervision of the Episcopal Church, the Anglican Episcopal Church of Brazil became an independent province in 1965 and consists of a single metropolitical province, so its head serves as both metropolitan and primate. In this role he uses the style of "Dom", typical of the hierarchs of the Catholic Church, but does not have the usual title of "Archbishop", being known by the alternative title of "Presiding Bishop" (Bispo Primaz). The primate bishops have been:

- Egmont Machado Krischke, 1965—1971
- Arthur Rodolpho Kratz, 1972—1984
- Olavo Ventura Luiz, 1986—1992
- Glauco Soares de Lima, 1993—2003
- Orlando Santos de Oliveira, 2003—2006
- Maurício José Araújo de Andrade, 2006—2013
- Francisco de Assis da Silva, 2013—2018
- Naudal Alves Gomes, 2018–2022
- Marinez Rosa dos Santos Bassotto, 2023- present

== Governance ==
A substantial proportion of the priests of the province are women. The president of the House of Clergy and Laity for the first time is a lay woman, Selma Rosa, who was elected at the general synod for a three-year term. The general secretary of the church is Arthur Cavalcante, also appointed at the general synod for a three-year term.

== Dioceses and mission districts ==
The province consists of nine dioceses, each headed by a bishop, one of whom is elected as Primate Bishop. The 30th General Synod of the church, held in July 2006, elevated the Amazon mission as the ninth diocese of the province and grouped the dioceses and the missionary district of the province into three regions.

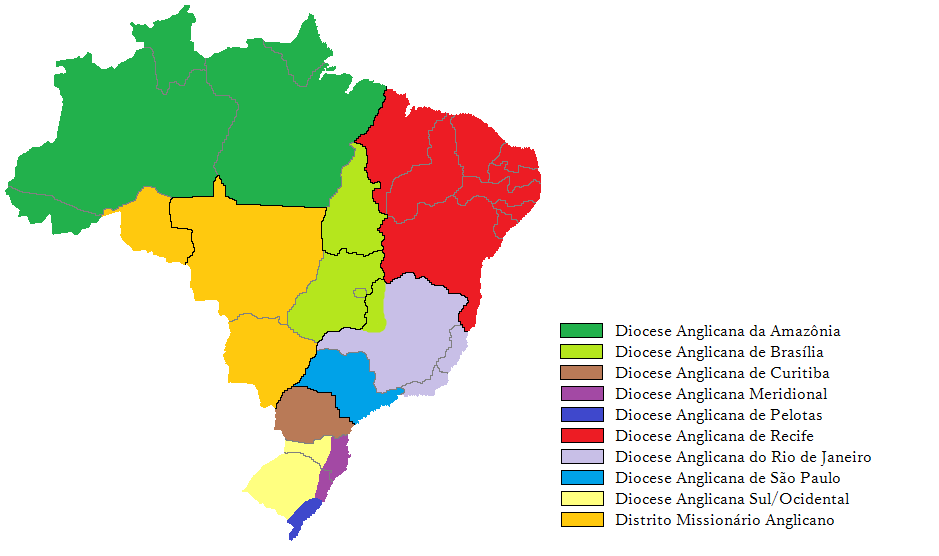
Anglican dioceses of Brazil and the missionary district (in dark yellow).

- Diocese of the Amazon
  - Headed by Bishop Marinez Rosa dos Santos Bassotto, it covers the states of Pará, Amapá, Roraima, Amazonas and Acre.
- Diocese of Brasilia
  - Headed by Bishop Maurício José Araújo de Andrade (former Primate Bishop), it covers the Federal District, the states of Goiás, Tocantins and the west portion of Minas Gerais.
- Diocese of Curitiba
  - Headed by Bishop Naudal Alves Gomes, it covers the state of Paraná.
- Diocese of Pelotas
  - Headed by Bishop Renato Raatz, it covers the area of the town of Pelotas, Rio Grande do Sul and the surrounding coastline. Previous bishops include Luis Prado.
- Diocese of Recife
  - Headed by Bishop João Cancio Peixoto, it covers the area of the Northeast Region of Brazil.
- Diocese of Rio de Janeiro
  - Headed by Bishop Eduardo Coelho Grillo, it covers the states of Rio de Janeiro, Espírito Santo, and most of Minas Gerais.
- Diocese of São Paulo
  - Headed by Bishop Flávio Augusto Borges Irala, it covers the state of São Paulo.
- Southern Diocese
  - Headed by Bishop Francisco de Assis da Silva (also Primate Bishop), it covers the coastal areas of the states of Santa Catarina and Rio Grande do Sul, excluding the area in the Diocese of Pelotas.
- South-West Diocese
  - Headed by Bishop Humberto Maiztegui Gonçalves, it covers the inland areas of the states of Santa Catarina and Rio Grande do Sul.
- Missionary District of the West
  - Also headed by Bishop Francisco de Assis da Silva, it covers the states of Rondônia, Mato Grosso and Mato Grosso do Sul.

== Social issues ==
Due to the predominance of the Liberal wing – which defends a social interpretation of the Gospels because of the oppression that a literal interpretation may cause – IEAB rejects fanaticism and preaches that the church should be an instrument of social change, seeking to engage congregations and communities in debates still considered taboo in Brazilian society, such as those involving land concentration, domestic violence, sexism, racism, homophobia and xenophobia. It describes itself as concerned about the social, political, moral and spiritual lives of its members. It is also considered an inclusive church for it accepts, as members, people from historically marginalized groups such as LGBT, women, indigenous and landless. According to the canons of IEAB, "as Christians, we bear the promise of the Holy Spirit, which leads us to the Word made flesh, who welcomes the oppressed, the neglected, the misunderstood and the marginalized".

IEAB argues that "everyone baptized, faithful and obedient to God, regardless of their sexual orientation, are full members of the Body of Christ, the Church". According to Cardoso, the Church has welcomed gay people as members since 1998. In 1997, the Bishops of IEAB signed a document saying that "sexuality is a gift from God, and sexual intercourse, when practiced in a context of love and mutual respect, should not only be accepted but also considered as one of the good things that God has created". In 2001, IEAB conducted the first national consultation on human sexuality, when its members decided to reject "the principle of exclusion implicit in the ethics of sin and uncleanness" and declare inclusiveness as an "essence of the ministry of Jesus". On 12 May 2011, IEAB released a statement declaring its support for the Supreme Federal Court decision to recognize same-sex unions in Brazil. More recently, the Presiding Bishop issued a letter in support of the Episcopal Church's decision to adopt a non-gender marriage stance and stating that he wanted his church to do the same soon. The Church has declared its support for the ordination of openly gay clergy and has offered a service of blessing for same-sex marriages. According to Santos, the political progressivism of IEAB's religious leaders is the reflex of their broad theological education.

In June 2016, the presiding bishop convened an Extraordinary Synod to discuss amending the marriage canon to include same-sex marriage, but a consensus was not reached; the issue will be considered in the General Synod in 2017. IEAB is among the Anglican churches that are open to blessing same-sex unions. "Anglican churches in Brazil, South Africa, New Zealand and Scotland have moved to recognize same-sex relationships."

Clergy were able to enter civil partnerships, and are now also able to enter into same-sex marriages. On 1 June 2018 the General Synod voted to change the marriage canon to allow same-sex couples to get married.

== Anglican realignment ==
The Diocese of Recife, led by Bishop Robinson Cavalcanti, withdrew from IEAB in 2005, due to their disagreement with the national church policies on homosexuality. The diocese renamed itself as Anglican Church-Diocese of Recife and joined the Global South realignment movement as an extraprovincial diocese.

== See also ==
- Anglican Chapel of Salvador, former church building in Salvador, Bahia
