= Anglican Diocese of Mount Kilimanjaro =

Diocese in Anglican Church of Tanzania

Coordinates: 03°04′33″S 37°21′12″E

The Diocese of Mount Kilimanjaro is a diocese in the Anglican Church of Tanzania: its current bishop is the Right Reverend Dr Stanley Hotay.
