= Donald Mtetemela =

Former Tanzanian Anglican archbishop and primate

The Most Reverend Donald Mtetemela
- Archbishop emeritus of Tanzania
- Church: Anglican Church of Tanzania
- Previous posts: Archbishop of Tanzania, Bishop of Ruaha

Orders
- Ordination: 1971
- Consecration: 1982 by Mussa Kahurananga

Personal details
- Born: 1947 (age 78–79)

Donald Leo Mtetemela (born 1947) is a former Tanzanian Anglican archbishop. He was archbishop and primate of the Anglican Church of Tanzania, from 1998 to 2008. He is married and has seven children.

He was raised in an Anglican family from the Anglo-Catholic tradition. He earned a diploma in theology at St. Philip's Theological College, in Kongwa, and was ordained a priest in 1971. His first mission was to plant a church in a village with no Anglican presence, which was successful and inspired him in the purposes of evangelism and church planting. Afterwards he would study at Wycliffe Hall, in Oxford, England, in 1975–1976, where he achieved a diploma in theology.

Mtetemela was nominated assistant bishop to the Diocese of Central Tanganyika in 1982. He would be the first bishop of the Diocese of Ruaha, from 1990 to 2010.

In February 1998 he was elected by the Electoral College of the Anglican Church of Tanzania their fourth archbishop, also remaining as Bishop of Ruaha. He was reelected for another five years term at 25 February 2003, by the Electoral College at the Cathedral of the Holy Spirit, in Dodoma.

Mtetemela, a theological conservative, opposed the pro-homosexuality policies of the Episcopal Church of the United States and the Anglican Church of Canada, and was a leading name in the Anglican realignment, specially after the ordination of a partnered homosexual as a bishop by the Episcopal Church, in 2003. He was one of the 14 Global South Primates that signed the original document that supported the creation of the Anglican Communion Network in the United States, in 2004, and also attended the Global Anglican Future Conference, in Jerusalem, in June 2008. He supported the inception of the Anglican Church in North America, in June 2009. His work for the Anglican realignment was continued by his successor, Valentino Mokiwa, while he remained as Bishop of Ruaha, until his retirement in 2010. He still would attend GAFCON II, in Nairobi, Kenya, from 21 to 26 October 2013.

Anglican Communion titles
| Preceded by John Ramadhani | Primate of the Anglican Church of Tanzania; 1998–2008 | Succeeded by Valentino Mokiwa |
