= Valentino Mokiwa =

Valentino Leonard Mokiwa

Bishop of Dar es Salaam
- In office April 2002 – 7 January 2017
- Preceded by: Basil Sambano
- Succeeded by: Augustino Ramadhani (interim); Jackson Sosthenes

Archbishop of Tanzania
- In office 2008–2013
- Preceded by: Donald Mtetemela
- Succeeded by: Jacob Chimeledya

Personal details
- Born: 1965 (age 60–61)
- Spouse: Grace Joseph Pallangyo
- Children: Jerry Valentine Mokiwa Joseph Valentine Mokiwa
- Occupation: Anglican priest

Valentino Leonard Mokiwa (born 1954) is a former Tanzanian Anglican Archbishop. He was elected as the Primate and Archbishop of the Anglican Church of Tanzania in 2008 and occupied the position until 2013. Since being elected in April 2002, Mokiwa was the Bishop of the Diocese of Dar es Salaam, until his deposition in January 2017.

== Education ==
Mokiwa studied at Virginia Theological Seminary, in Alexandria, United States, and became a principal at St. Mark's Theological College in Dar es Salaam.

== Career ==
Mokiwa was Bishop of the Diocese of Dar es Salaam when he was elected the new Archbishop of Tanzania in a special session held during the General Synod of his church in Dodoma, on 28 February 2008. He was installed in Dodoma on 25 May 2008, succeeding Donald Mtetemela. He lost the reelection in a controversial runoff on 21 February 2013 to Jacob Chimeledya, who was amid fraud charges. Mokiwa's successor would be enthroned on 19 May 2013. While Mokiwa remained as Bishop of Dar es Salaam upon his defeat, he decided not to attend the GAFCON II, held in Nairobi, Kenya, in October 2013.

== Beliefs ==
Mokiwa, a theological Anglo-Catholic, like his predecessor, was also strongly critical of the departures of the Anglican tradition taken by the Episcopal Church of the United States and the Anglican Church of Canada. He supported the Anglican realignment, attending the Global Anglican Future Conference in Jerusalem, in 2008, and shortly after, the Lambeth Conference. He also expressed his support for the Anglican Church in North America, launched in 2009.

== Deposition ==
Mokiwa was deposed by Archbishop Jacob Chimeledya in January 2017, after he declined to resign in the wake of a corruption provincial investigation in the Diocese of Dar es Salaam. He refused to accept the deposition and filed a lawsuit against this decision. Mokiwa and Bishop Raphael Hafidh, of the Diocese of Kibondo, were both arrested after an angry exchange took place at a bishops meeting of the Anglican Church of Tanzania, in February 2017, but where released soon after.

Anglican Communion titles
Preceded by Donald Mtetemela	Primate of the Anglican Church of Tanzania; 2008–2013	Succeeded by Jacob Chimeledya
