= Anglican Church of Tanzania =

Anglican church in Tanzania

- Classification: Protestant
- Orientation: Anglican
- Scripture: Holy Bible
- Theology: Anglican doctrine
- Polity: Episcopal
- Primate: Maimbo Mndolwa
- Language: Swahili, English
- Headquarters: Dodoma, Tanzania
- Territory: Tanzania
- Members: 3,318,000
- Official website: https://www.anglican.or.tz/

The Anglican Church of Tanzania (ACT; Swahili: Kanisa la Anglikana la Tanzania) is a province of the Anglican Communion based in Dodoma. It consists of 28 dioceses (27 on the Tanzanian mainland, and 1 on Zanzibar) headed by their respective bishops. It seceded from the Province of East Africa in 1970, which it shared with Kenya. The current primate and archbishop is Maimbo Mndolwa, enthroned on 20 May 2018.

In 2002, the Anglican Church of Tanzania claimed 2.5 million members. In 2016, peer-review research in the Journal of Anglican Studies, published by Cambridge University Press, reported that there were 2,000,000 members of the Anglican Church of Tanzania. In 2017, Growth and Decline in the Anglican Communion: 1980 to the Present, published by Routledge, collected research reporting there were 3,318,000 Anglicans in Tanzania.

== Name ==
The church became part of the Province of East Africa in 1960. From 1970 until 1997, it was known as the Church of the Province of Tanzania. Since its autonomous formation, it has been known as the Anglican Church of Tanzania, or ACT.

== History ==
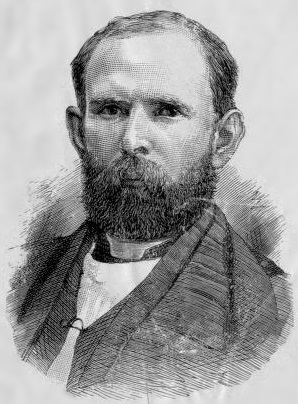
James Hannington was the first bishop of Eastern Equatorial Africa.

=== Tanganyika ===
The church's origins lie in the Diocese of Eastern Equatorial Africa (Uganda, Kenya, Tanzania) founded in 1884, with James Hannington as the first bishop; however, Anglican missionary activity had been present in the area since the Universities' Mission to Central Africa and the Church Missionary Society began their work in 1864 and 1878 at Mpwapwa. In 1898, the diocese was split into two, with the new diocese of Mombasa governing Kenya and northern and Central Tanzania (the other diocese later became the Church of Uganda); northern and central Tanzania was separated from the diocese in 1927 when the Diocese of Central Tanganyika covering two thirds of Tanzania was created with its See at Dodoma. The first bishop was George "Jerry" Chambers, consecrated in 1927.

William (Bill) Wynn-Jones was the second bishop of Central Tanganyika. In 1955, the diocese's first African bishops, Kenyans Festo Olang' and Obadiah Kariuki, and Tanzanian (Tanganyikan) Yohana Omari were consecrated by the Archbishop of Canterbury, Geoffrey Fisher, in Uganda as assistant bishops. In 1964, John Sepeku became bishop of the newly-divided Diocese of Dar es Salaam (having previously been assistant bishop of Zanzibar). (Olang as well as Sepeku would be elected the first African archbishops in 1970). In 1960, the province of East Africa, comprising Kenya and Tanzania, was formed with Leonard Beecher as first archbishop. The province of East Africa was divided in two, Kenya and Tanzania, in 1970 and the province of Tanzania was formed with John Sepeku as the first archbishop. By 1962, Musa Kahurananga was Assistant Bishop of Central Tanganyika; in 1964, Yohana Madinda took on the same post.

=== Zanzibar ===
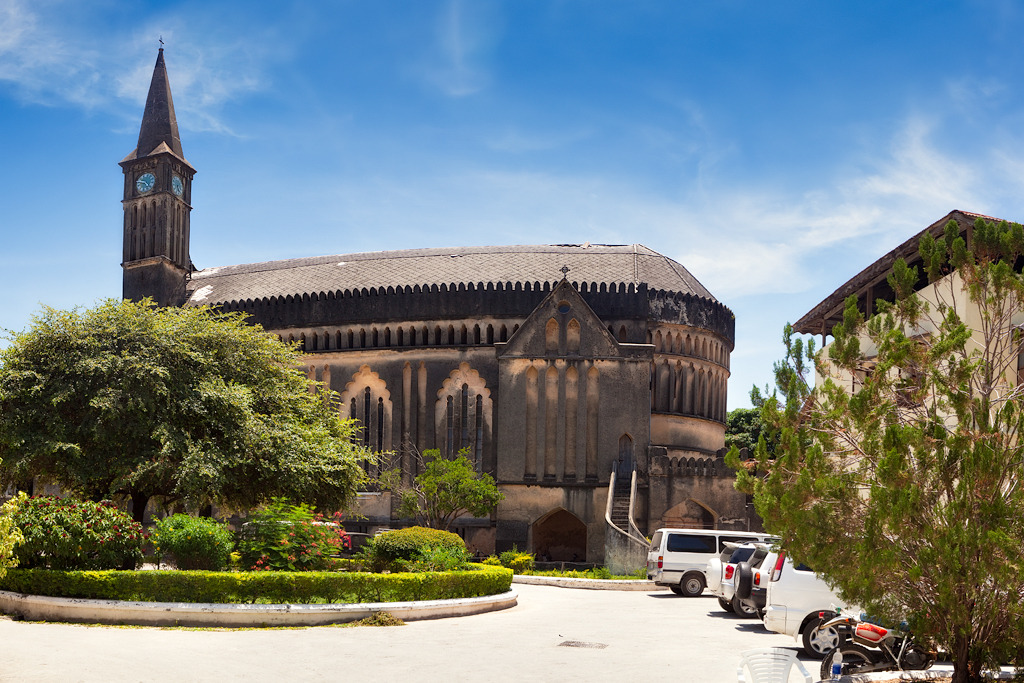
View of the cathedral of Christ Church, Zanzibar.

The Diocese of Zanzibar was founded in 1892, and developed separately from that of Eastern Equatorial Africa. Whilst mainland Tanzania was largely under the influence of evangelical missionary societies, Zanzibar was evangelised by Anglo-catholic missionaries, and represented a far more high church form of Anglicanism. The mainland territories and Zanzibar were united when the Province of East Africa was formed.

The first bishop of Zanzibar was Charles Smythies, who was translated from his former post as Bishop of Nyasaland in 1892. Zanzibar Cathedral, located in Stone Town, Zanzibar City, is a prominent landmark, and a national heritage asset. Historically the diocese included mainland locations in Tanganyika, and In 1963 it was renamed as the Diocese of Zanzibar & Dar es Salaam. Two years later, in 1965, Dar es Salaam became a separate diocese, and the original was again renamed as the Diocese of Zanzibar & Tanga. In 2001 the mainland links were finally ended, and the name reverted to the original Diocese of Zanzibar. The diocese continues to include the neighbouring island of Pemba. There have been ten bishops of the diocese from 1892 to the present day.

Having fallen into poor condition, Zanzibar Cathedral was fully restored, at a cost of one million Euros, to reopen in 2016, with a world heritage visitor centre. The restoration was supported by the Tanzanian and Zanzibari governments, and spearheaded by the diocese in partnership with the World Monuments Fund. The restoration of the spire, clock, and historic Willis organ are still outstanding.

== Membership ==
According to statistics from 2002 to 2016, there were at least 2,500,000 Anglicans out of an estimated population of 61,500,000 in Tanzania. According to a peer-reviewed quantitative study published in the Journal of Anglican Studies by Cambridge University Press in 2016, the Church of Tanzania has more than 2 million total members and approximately 170,000 active baptised members.

Independent associations open to members of the church include the Mothers' Union (MU), the Tanzania Anglican Youth Organization (TAYO) and the Anglican Evangelistic Association (AEA).

Among the Church's prominent educational institutions are the newly founded St. John's University of Tanzania based in Dodoma, as well as the two Provincial Theological Colleges, St. Phillip's located at Kongwa, and St Mark's in Dar es Salaam).

The Central Tanganyika Press (CTP) and the Literature Organization (SKM, also known as the Dar es Salaam Bookshop), are autonomous church institutions with a prominent role in Anglican church life.

== Structure ==
In common with other Anglican churches the Anglican Church of Tanzania has an episcopal polity. The Archbishop of Tanzania is both metropolitan and primate of the church. The church maintains a system of geographical parishes organized into dioceses. There are currently 28 dioceses, each headed by a diocesan bishop.

=== Dioceses ===
- Biharamulo
- Central Tanganyika
- Dar es Salaam
- Kagera
- Kibondo
- Kondoa
- Lweru
- Mara
- Masasi
- Morogoro
- Mount Kilimanjaro
- Mpwapwa
- Newala
- Rift Valley
- Ruaha
- Rorya
- Ruvuma
- Shinyanga
- South-West Tanganyika
- Southern Highlands
- Tabora
- Tanga
- Tarime
- Victoria Nyanza
- Western Tanganyika
- Zanzibar
- Kiteto
- Lake Rukwa

=== Archbishops ===
The primate of the church is the Archbishop of Tanzania. The see of the archbishop was formerly fixed at Dodoma but is now non-geographical. Whichever bishop is elected as primate remains bishop of his own diocese, as well as becoming the Archbishop of Tanzania. There have been seven archbishops since the Province of East Africa was divided into the Provinces of Kenya and Tanzania in 1970.

- 1970–1978: John Sepeku, Bishop of Dar es Salaam
- 1979–1983: Mussa Kahurananga
- 1984–1998: John Ramadhani
- 1998–2008: Donald Mtetemela
- 2008–2013: Valentino Mokiwa
- 2013–2018: Jacob Chimeledya
- 2018–present: Maimbo Mndolwa

=== Other bishops ===
Alfred Stanway (called Alf; 9 September 1908 – 27 June 1989) was the third bishop of Central Tanganyika, 1951–1971. He was made a deacon on St Thomas' Day 1934 (21 December) in St Paul's Cathedral, Melbourne, ordained a priest about a year later, and consecrated a bishop on Candlemas 1951 (2 February) by Geoffrey Fisher, Archbishop of Canterbury, at Westminster Abbey.

== Doctrine and practice ==
The Anglican Church of Tanzania embraces the three traditional orders of ministry: deacon, priest, and bishop. A local variant of the Book of Common Prayer is used.

The center of the Anglican Church of Tanzania teaching is the life and resurrection of Jesus Christ. The basic teachings of the church, or catechism, includes:

- Jesus Christ is fully human and fully God. He died and was resurrected from the dead.
- Jesus provides the way of eternal life for those who believe.
- The Old and New Testaments of the Bible were written by people "under the inspiration of the Holy Spirit". The Apocrypha are additional books that are used in Christian worship, but not for the formation of doctrine.
- The two great and necessary sacraments are Holy Baptism and Holy Eucharist
- Other sacramental rites are confirmation, ordination, marriage, reconciliation of a penitent, and unction.
- Belief in heaven, hell, and Jesus's return in glory.

The threefold sources of authority in Anglicanism are scripture, tradition, and reason. These three sources uphold and critique each other in a dynamic way. This balance of scripture, tradition and reason is traced to the work of Richard Hooker, a sixteenth-century apologist. In Hooker's model, scripture is the primary means of arriving at doctrine and things stated plainly in scripture are accepted as true. Issues that are ambiguous are determined by tradition, which is checked by reason.

=== Ordination of women ===
In 2024 the Anglican Diocese of Tabora in the Anglican Church of Tanzania voted to allow the ordination of women priests. The other dioceses in the Anglican Church of Tanzania currently ordaining women are: the Anglican Diocese of Central Tanganyika, the Anglican Diocese of Morogoro, the Anglican Diocese of Kondoa, the Anglican Diocese of Mpwapwa, the Anglican Diocese of Kiteto, the Anglican Diocese of Mara, and the Anglican Diocese of Rift Valley.

== Ecumenical relations ==
Like many other Anglican churches, the Anglican Church of Tanzania is a member of the ecumenical World Council of Churches.

== Anglican realignment ==
In December 2006 the ACT declared itself to be in "impaired communion" with the Episcopal Church over the ordination of non-celibate gay people and the blessing of same-sex unions. However, some dioceses of the Episcopal Church and the Anglican Church of Tanzania have continued to share partnerships. For example, as of 2018, the Episcopal Diocese of Massachusetts continued to have a missional partnership with the Anglican Diocese of Tanga in Tanzania.

The ACT is a member of the Global Fellowship of Confessing Anglicans and the Global South Fellowship of Anglican Churches, and has been a part of the Anglican realignment. Archbishop Valentino Mokiwa attended GAFCON in Jerusalem, in June 2008, and supported the inception of the Anglican Church in North America, in June 2009. Archbishop Jacob Chimeledya, an evangelical and orthodox Anglican, was perceived by some to have moved the ACT more into the "reconciliation" ground, as was being promoted by Archbishop of Canterbury Justin Welby, moving away from GAFCON. He didn't attend GAFCON II in Nairobi, in 21–16 October 2013, where ACT was represented by former Archbishop Donald Mtetemela and other bishops. The ACT House of Bishops meeting, held in Dodoma, on 12–13 April 2016, voted to rejoin the GAFCON movement and to authorize Jacob Chimeledya to attend GAFCON's primates council in Nairobi the same month, which he did.

The ACT was represented at GAFCON III, in Jerusalem, on 17–22 June 2018, by a 26 members delegation, which included former Archbishop Jacob Chimeledya. Archbishop Maimbo Mndolwa was registered to attend but wasn't able to come.

The official branch of GAFCON Tanzania was launched on 14 August 2019, in a meeting held in Dar es Salaam, that reunited 10 bishops of the province, including former Archbishop Jacob Chimeledya, and had the support of one more absent bishop and the retired Archbishop Donald Mtetemela. The bishops represented agreed not the attend the Lambeth Conference in 2020, due to the Archbishop of Canterbury's unwillingness in discipline the provinces that have rejected the Lambeth 1.10 1998 resolution on human sexuality. Bishop Mwita Akiri was elected branch chairman on the occasion. Archbishop Maimbo Mndolwa, despite having signed the Jerusalem Declaration, hasn't declared yet his formal support for GAFCON Tanzania; and at least two dioceses—Kagera and Kibondo—have partnered with the Anglican Mission in America.
