= Anglican Diocese of Mpwapwa =

Coordinates: 06°20′54″S 36°29′12″E

The Diocese of Mpwapwa is a central diocese in the Anglican Church of Tanzania: its current bishop is the Most Reverend Jacob Chimeledya.

It allows the ordination of women.
