= Jacob Chimeledya =

Tanzanian Anglican bishop

The Most Reverend Jacob Chimeledya
- Primate of Tanzania, Bishop of Mpwapwa
- Church: Anglican Church of Tanzania
- See: Dodoma
- In office: May 2013-May 2018
- Previous post: Co-Adjutor Bishop of Mpwapwa

Orders
- Ordination: 1996
- Consecration: 2005 by Donald Mtetemela

Personal details
- Born: 28 August 1957 (age 68) Zoisa, Kongwa

Jacob Erasto Chimeledya (born Zoisa, Kongwa, 28 August 1957) is a Tanzanian Anglican bishop. He was elected archbishop and primate of the Anglican Church of Tanzania on 21 February 2013 in a vote against the incumbent, Valentino Mokiwa, in a controversial election. He was enthroned on 19 May 2013 and also remained bishop of the Diocese of Mpwapwa. He was in office until 21 May 2018.

Chimeledya studied health administration at the Mzumbe Institute of Development Management, currently Mzumbe University, in 1992. He has a degree in theology from St. Paul's University, Limuru, Kenya, where he studied from 1993 to 1996. He was ordained a deacon in 1996 and a priest in 1997. He received a master's degree at the Virginia Theological Seminary in the United States, which he attended from 2001 to 2003.

He was a priest in several parishes of the Diocese of Mpwapwa, being also Principal of St. Philip's Theological College, in Kongwa, from 2003 to 2005. He was consecrated Co-Adjutor Bishop of the Diocese of Mpwapwa in 2005, becoming diocesan bishop in 2007 upon the retirement of Simon Chiwanga.

He was the unexpected winner at the election of the archbishop and primate of the Anglican Church of Tanzania, against Valentino Mokiwa, that took place on 21 February 2013 at the Cathedral of the Holy Spirit in Dodoma, by three votes. The validity of his election was disputed by Mokiwa, who filed a lawsuit on 27 February 2013, with charges of several irregularities and the alleged use of the influence of money from the American Episcopal Church, who wished to create divisions upon an Anglican province in Africa. Chimeledya supporters strongly denied these charges and the election was approved by all the 25 bishops of the Anglican Church of Tanzania, with two absent in South Africa.

Chimeledya attended the first GAFCON meeting, held in Jerusalem, on 21-26 June 2008. Concerning his attitude towards the Anglican realignment, Bishop Martyn Minns of the Convocation of Anglicans in North America stated in April 2013 that he "has already expressed his strong support for GAFCON." However, Chimeledya failed to attend GAFCON II, in Nairobi, Kenya, held from 21 to 26 October 2013. Chimeledya moved away from GAFCON for a while but decided to rejoin it, after the ACT House of Bishops meeting in Dodoma, on 12-13 April 2016. He attended GAFCON III, on 17-22 June 2018.

Anglican Communion titles
Preceded by Valentino Mokiwa	Primate of the Anglican Church of Tanzania; 2013–2018	Succeeded by Maimbo Mndolwa
