= Cecil Norgate =

Anglican Bishop of Masasi from 1984 until 1992

Cecil Richard Norgate (10 November 1921 – 7 October 2008) was the Anglican Bishop of Masasi from 1984 until 1992.

His father was Cecil Francis Norgate, Rector of Great Casterton, near Stamford, Lincolnshire, from 1928 until his death in 1953. His mother died in 1928. He was educated at Stamford School and St Chad's College, Durham University where his study of Theology was interrupted by the war. After Second World War service with the Royal Navy, he was ordained in 1950. After a curacy at St Peter's Church, Wallsend, he became a missionary priest with the Universities' Mission to Central Africa in Masasi, Tanganyika in 1954. After long service he became Bishop of the diocese after no suitable Tanzanian-born candidate could be identified and after retirement continued to live in Tanzania until his death.

Religious titles
Preceded by Gayo Hilary Chisonga	Bishop of Masasi; 1984–1992	Succeeded by Patrick Mwachiko
