= John Simalenga =

Bishop of South-West Tanganyika

John Simalenga was the Bishop of South-West Tanganyika: he died in 2013.
