= Leslie Stradling =

Anglican bishop (1908–1998)

Leslie Edward Stradling (11 February 1908 – 8 January 1998) was an Anglican bishop in three separate African dioceses during the mid-20th century.

Born on 11 February 1908 and educated at King Edward VII School, Sheffield and The Queen's College, Oxford; he was made a deacon on Trinity Sunday 1933 (11 June) and ordained a priest the next Trinity Sunday (27 May 1934) — both times by Richard Parsons, Bishop of Southwark, at Southwark Cathedral. After a curacy at St Paul's, Lorrimore Square he was Vicar of St Luke's, Camberwell and then of St Anne's, Wandsworth before being appointed the Church's youngest bishop in 1945. He was consecrated a bishop on St James's Day 1945 (25 July), by Geoffrey Fisher, Archbishop of Canterbury, at Westminster Abbey. Translated from Masasi to be the first Bishop of South-West Tanganyika in 1952, his final post was as Bishop of Johannesburg.

He died in 1998 in Cape Town.

Anglican Communion titles
Preceded by William Lucas	Bishop of Masasi; 1945–1952	Succeeded by Mark Way
New diocese	Bishop of South-West Tanganyika; 1952–1961	Succeeded by John Poole-Hughes
Anglican Church of Southern Africa titles
Preceded by Ambrose Reeves	Bishop of Johannesburg; 1961–1974	Succeeded by Timothy Bavin
