= Mark Way =

British Anglican bishop

Wilfrid Lewis Mark Way (called Mark; 12 May 1905 – 30 July 1982) was a British Anglican bishop. He was the third Bishop of Masasi, serving during the third quarter of the 20th century.

Born on 12 May 1905 and educated at Rossall School and Trinity College, Cambridge, he was ordained in 1929.

He was made a deacon in Advent 1928 (on 23 December) and ordained a priest the next Advent (22 December 1929) — both times by Albert David, Bishop of Liverpool, at Liverpool Cathedral. After curacies at St Faith, Great Crosby and St Bartholomew, Brighton he became an UMCA Missionary in Tanzania. He was Curate of Korogwe then Priest in charge of several Zanzibar Missions and finally (before his elevation to the episcopate) Warden of Kalole Theological College. He was consecrated a bishop on St Luke's Day 1952 (18 October) at Westminster Abbey. On his return to England he was Rector of Averham (1960–1971), and during that time also an Assistant Bishop of Southwell. He died on 30 July 1982.

Anglican Communion titles
Preceded by Leslie Stradling	Bishop of Masasi; 1952–1959	Succeeded by Trevor Huddleston
