= John Poole-Hughes =

British bishop (1916–1988)

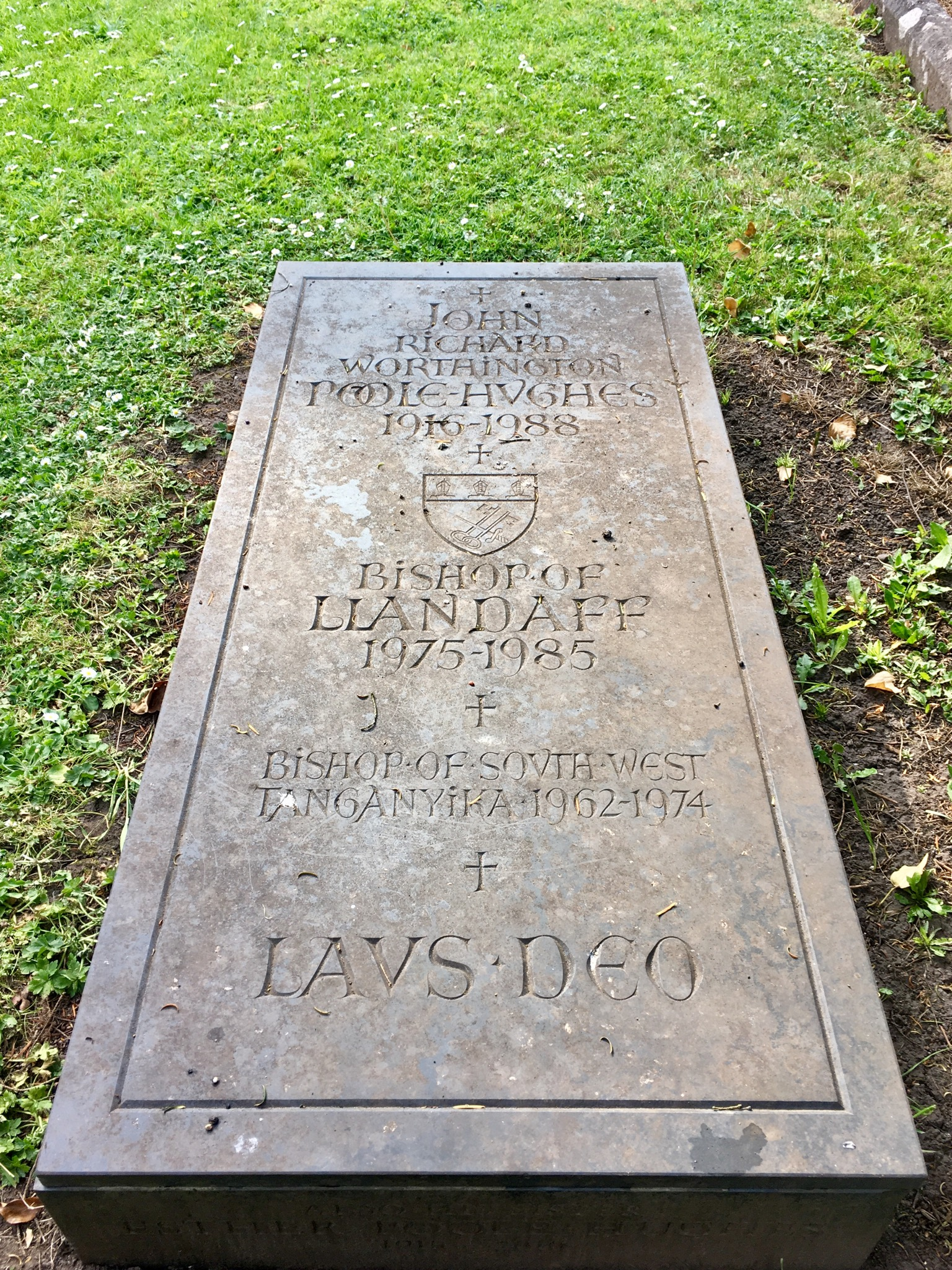
Poole-Hughes's grave in the churchyard of Llandaff Cathedral. Picture taken in May 2020.

John Richard Worthington Poole-Hughes (8 August 1916 – 25 October 1988) was a Bishop of South-West Tanganyika and a Bishop of Llandaff.

He was born in Carmarthenshire, Wales to Canon W. W. Poole-Hughes and his wife, and was educated at Uppingham School and Hertford College, Oxford. On graduation, he joined the Royal Artillery and fought in World War II; he was taken prisoner at Mersa Matruh in Egypt, but escaped to return to his unit.

After the war he studied at Wells Theological College and was ordained in 1948. After a curacy at St Michael and All Angels, Aberystwyth he served as a missionary in East Africa rising to the rank of diocesan Bishop in Tanzania. After serving as Assistant Bishop and as curate of Llantwit Major he was appointed to succeed Eryl Thomas as Bishop of Llandaff in 1975 and enthroned in the following year.

He contributed to the publication of Escape an episode in the life of John Richard Worthington Poole-Hughes, Bishop of South West Tanganyika, 1962-1974.

His diaries and letters are held at the Bodleian Library at Oxford University.

He died in 1988; he left no wife or children.

== Notes ==
Anglican Communion titles
Preceded by Leslie Stradling	Bishop of South-West Tanganyika; 1962–1974	Succeeded by Joseph Willard Mlele
Church in Wales titles
Preceded by Eryl Thomas	Bishop of Llandaff; 1975–1985	Succeeded by Roy Davies
