= St Luke's Church, Wallsend =

St Luke's Wallsend
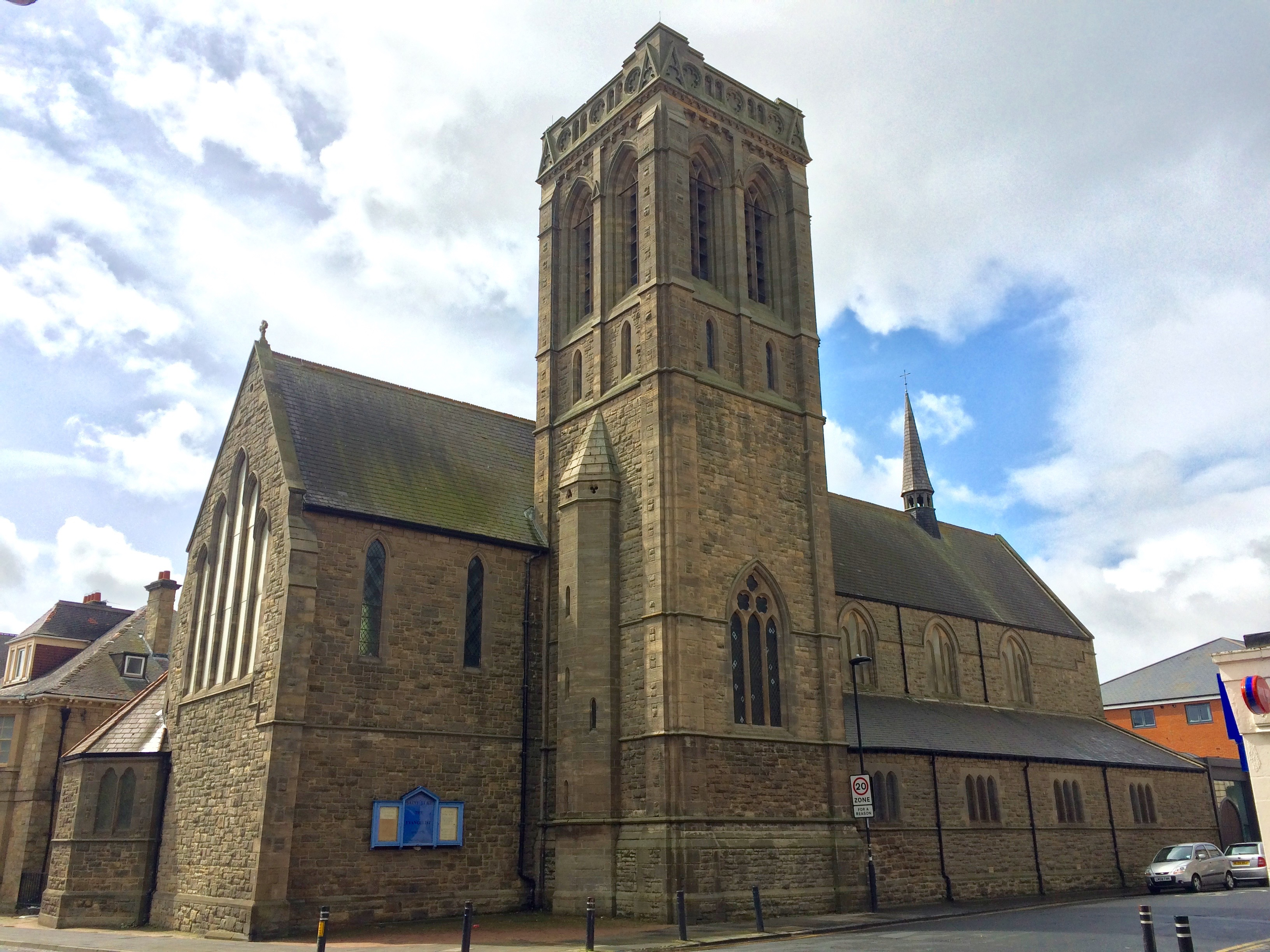
- St Luke's Wallsend
- 54.9905°N 1.5334°W
- Location: Frank Street, Wallsend
- Country: England
- Denomination: Church of England
- Churchmanship: Anglo-Catholic / High Church
- Website: www.achurchnearyou.com/wallsend-st-luke

History
- Status: Active
- Founded: 1887
- Dedication: St Luke

Architecture
- Functional status: Parish church

Administration
- Province: Province of York
- Diocese: Diocese of Newcastle
- Archdeaconry: Archdeaconry of Northumberland
- Deanery: Tynemouth
- Parish: Wallsend St Peter and St Luke

The Church of St Luke is a Church of England Grade II* listed church located in the centre of Wallsend, North Tyneside, next to Station Road.

== History ==
Due to an increase of the population in Wallsend, supported by both coalmining and shipbuilding industries, the parish of St Peter, Wallsend was divided in 1887, with the western portion becoming the new parish of St Luke, complete with a new church.

The foundation stone was laid in 1885, and the building was consecrated in 1887, although construction was not completed until 1906.

One of the key donors to the new building was George B. Hunter, then managing partner of the Swan Hunter shipbuilding company. The long association between the church and the company (whose yard is just down Station Road) saw St Luke's nicknamed the ‘Shipyard Church’.

In 2001 the parish was merged with that of St Peter, Wallsend, reuniting the original parish and the two sister churches.

== Tradition ==
The church was founded in the Anglo-Catholic mould. Indeed, during the incumbency of the second vicar, Fr William O'Brady-Jones, Anglo-Catholic practices were listed in evidence given to the Royal Commission on Ecclesiastical Discipline in 1904. But after his departure 1908, with the then Bishop of Newcastle being unsympathetic to Anglo-Catholics, a Low Churchman was appointed. The High Church tradition lay dormant until Fr Colin Turnbull, who began his ministry as an assistant curate at St Peter's, Wallsend, was made vicar.

== Stained Glass ==
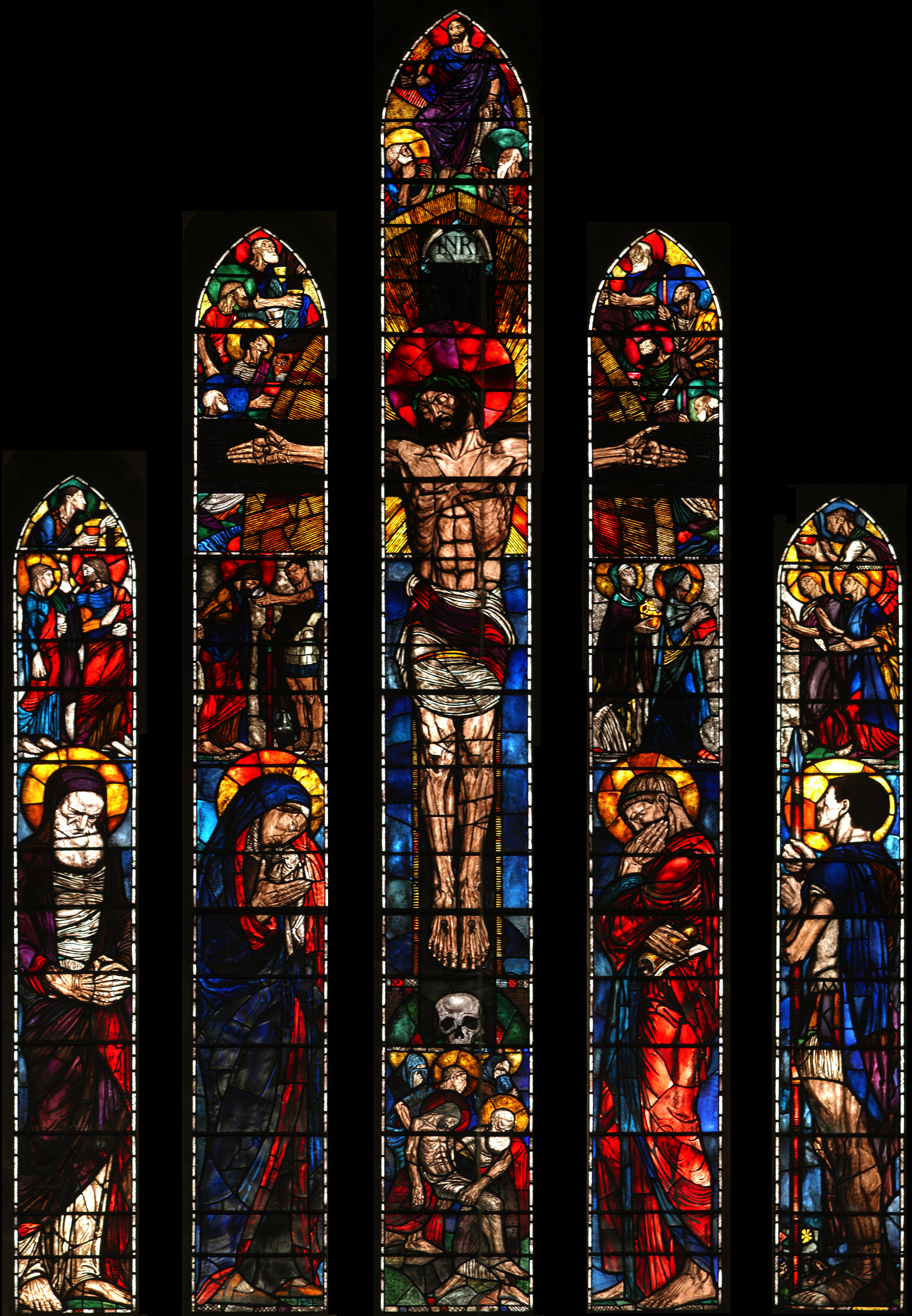
The east window, made by Miss Geddes as a First World War Memorial

Inside, the church's most striking feature is the magnificent east Window. It portrays the Crucifixion, and was unveiled in 1922 as a memorial to the men of the parish who died on active service during the First World War. Designed by the artist Wilhelmina Geddes, it has been widely lauded and described by Nikolaus Pevsner as of ‘quite exceptionally high quality’ and is regarded as one of her finest works.

== Other notable features ==
The church's architecture is in the Early English Gothic style, designed by Oliver, Leeson & Wood, and the tower is an easily recognisable landmark on the Wallsend skyline. Originally it was meant to be even taller, with a spire on top: however, quicksand below prevented this being carried out.

The pipe organ is by Abbott and Smith of Leeds, and its specification is detailed at the National Pipe Organ Register.

The vestries at the west end of the church are a memorial to Kathleen O'Brady-Jones, the eldest daughter of Fr O’Brady-Jones. She was accidentally shot during a rehearsal for an entertainment organised by the church in the nearby Co-op Hall, by a boy who had bought a revolver in the Bigg Market in Newcastle: whilst showing it to his friends the gun fired and Kathleen was killed.

The Anglican church in Wallsend, New South Wales, also a suburb of Newcastle, NSW, is dedicated to St Luke, following the dedication of this St Luke's.

== Clergy ==
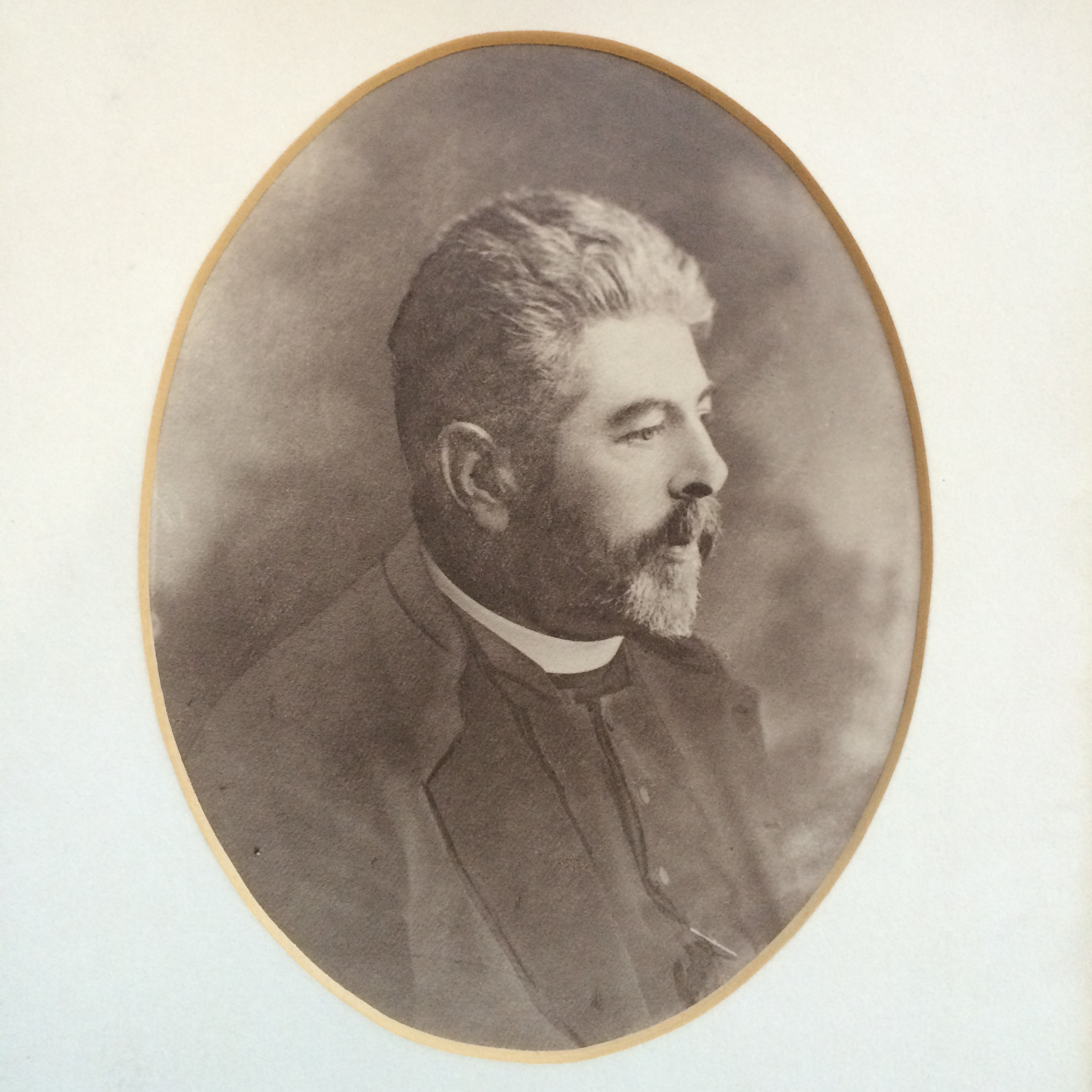
Fr O'Brady-Jones's picture in the vestry of Wallsend St Luke

Vicars of Wallsend St Luke

- 1887-1892 W.S. Wrenford
- 1892-1908 William O'Brady-Jones
- 1908-1912 R. Nicholson
- 1912-1923 T.W. Allen
- 1923-1933 A. Simpson
- 1933-1943 J.H. Johnston
- 1943-1952 Robert McCaughey
- 1953-1958 Donald MacNaughton
- 1958-1968 Colin Turnbull
- 1969-1971 John Clay
- 1971-1989 Peter Heywood
- 1990-1996 John Inge
- 1996-2001 Richard Deadman

Rectors of Wallsend St Peter & St Luke

- 2001-2011 Michael Vine
- 2012-2019 David Sudron

Assistant Curates

- 1937-1941 Arthur Donnelly
- 1947-1949 Matthew Hodgson
- 1949-1951 Jack Walker
- 1952-1955 Peter Rendell
- 1953-1954 George Betts
- 1955-1960 Bernard Mather
- 1957-1958 Ralph Knight
- 1960-1963 Lionel Trevor Eddershaw
- 1961-1964 Richard Hicks
- 1963-1967 David Rogerson
- 1965-1968 Keith Ward
- 1967-1969 Richard Kingsbury
- 1969-1970 Thomas Stevens
- 1971 William Golightly
- 1973-1976 Howard Smith
- 1976-1979 Michael Vine
- 1979-1982 Stephen Pickering
- 1982-1983 Richard Hill
- 1983-1986 Iain Young
- 1988-1991 Neil Wilson
- 1991-1995 Samuel Wells
- 1994-2002 Andrew Elder
- 1995-1997 Sheila Hamil (deacon)
- 2006-2007 Stephen Gillham (deacon)
- 2016-2020 Endre Kormos

== Today ==
Following large-scale alterations to the building in 2009–10, the church has become a home for many of the community gatherings which met in the old church hall. The west end of the church has been augmented and converted into halls and a kitchen that play host to a number of community groups. Also, the vestries are home to the Walking With Project, a charity set up by Wallsend Churches Working Together that supports asylum seekers and refugees in the North Tyneside area.

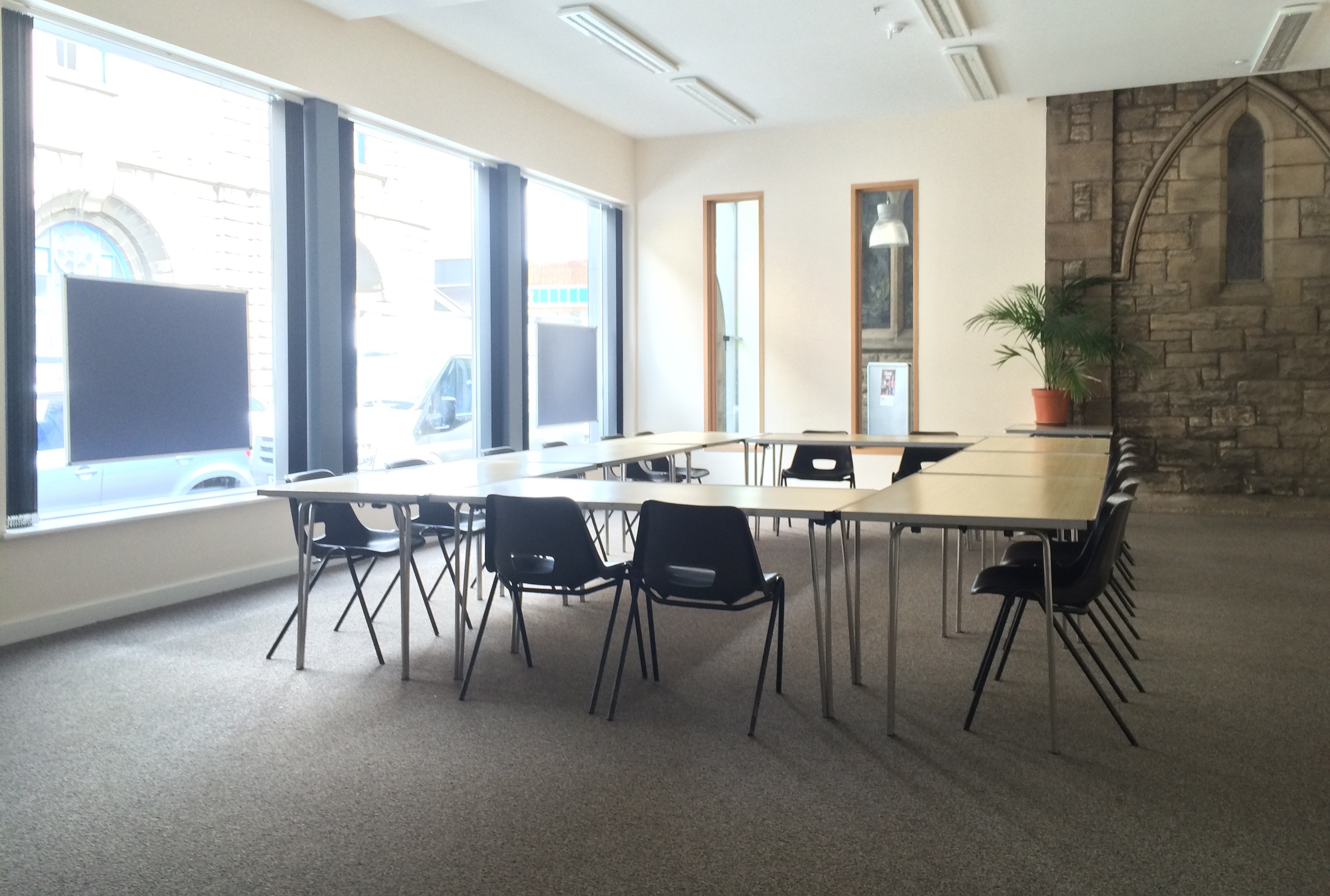
The new Church Hall looks across Frank St to Wallsend Memorial Hall

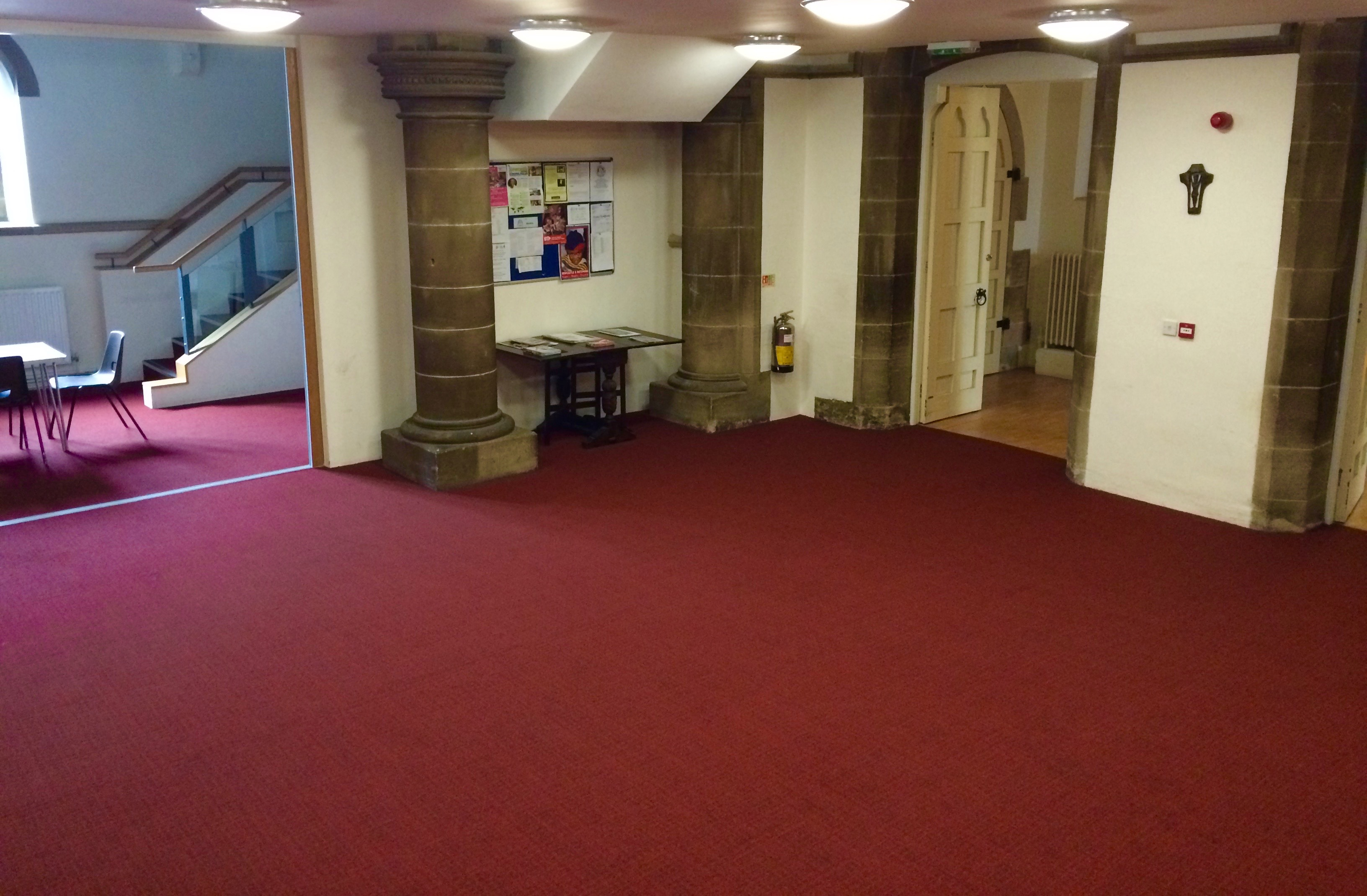
The west end of the nave has been subdivided

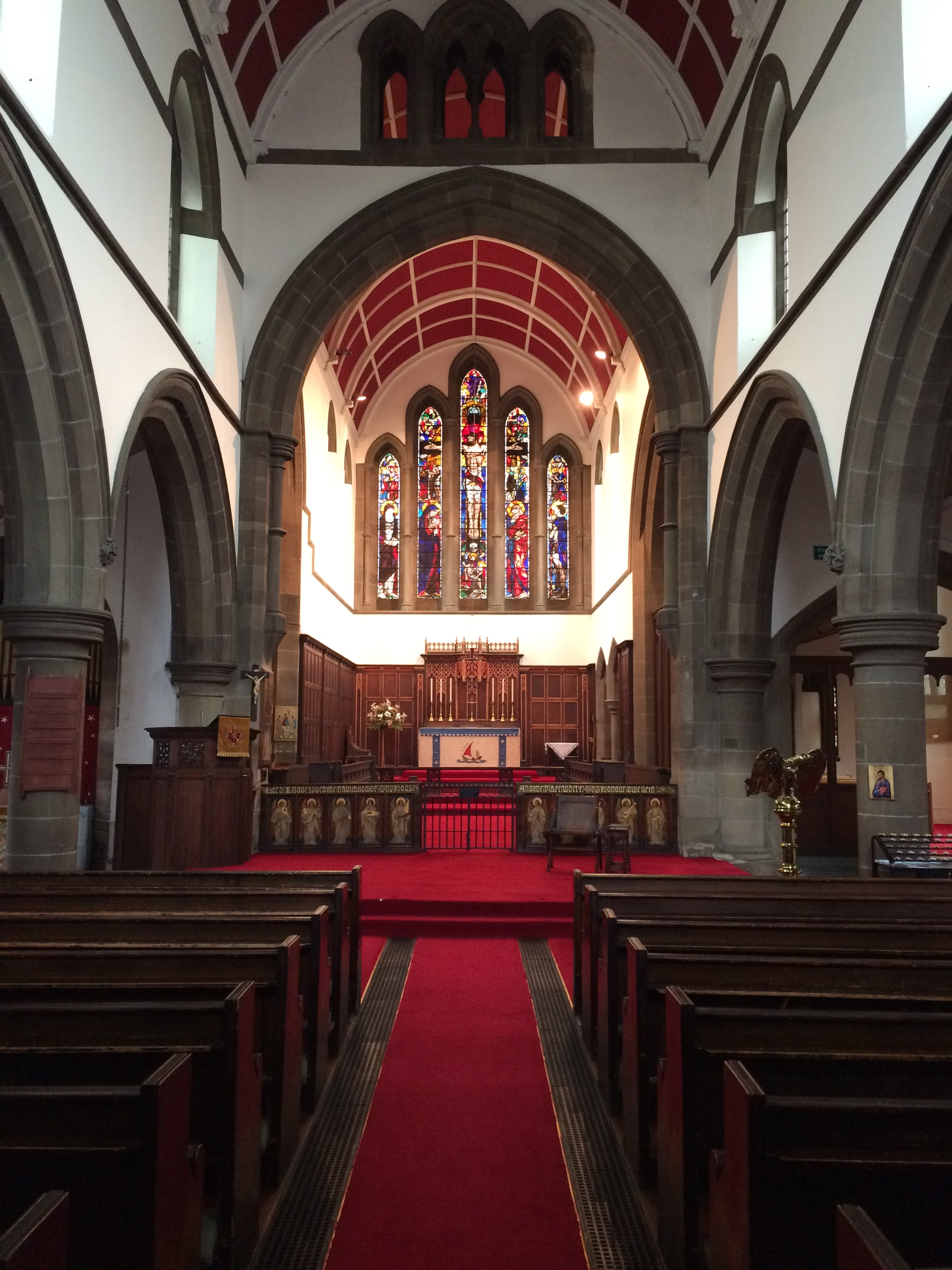
The nave of St Luke's, Wallsend, looking east

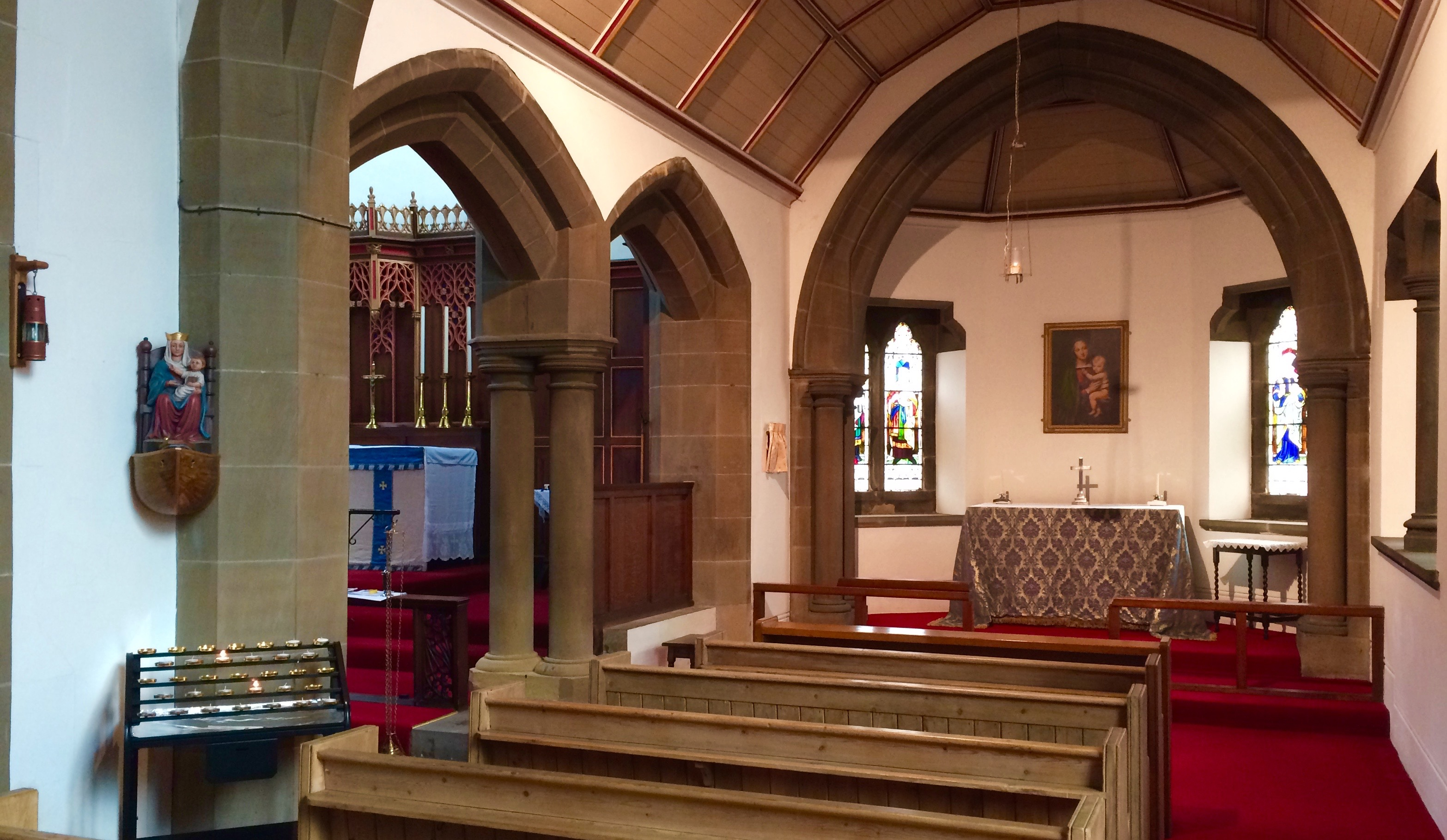
The Lady Chapel at the east end of the south aisle
