= Michael Westall =

Michael Robert Westall (born 1939) was bishop of South-West Tanganyika from 2001 until 2006.

Westall was educated at Queens' College, Cambridge and Ripon College Cuddesdon; and ordained in 1967. After a curacy at St Martin, Hereford he was a lecturer at Bishop’s College, Calcutta. He was principal of St Mark's Theological College Dar-es-Salaam from 1984 to 1992; and rector of St Mary Magdalene, Alfrick until his appointment as bishop.
