= St Peter's Church, Wallsend =

St Peter's Wallsend
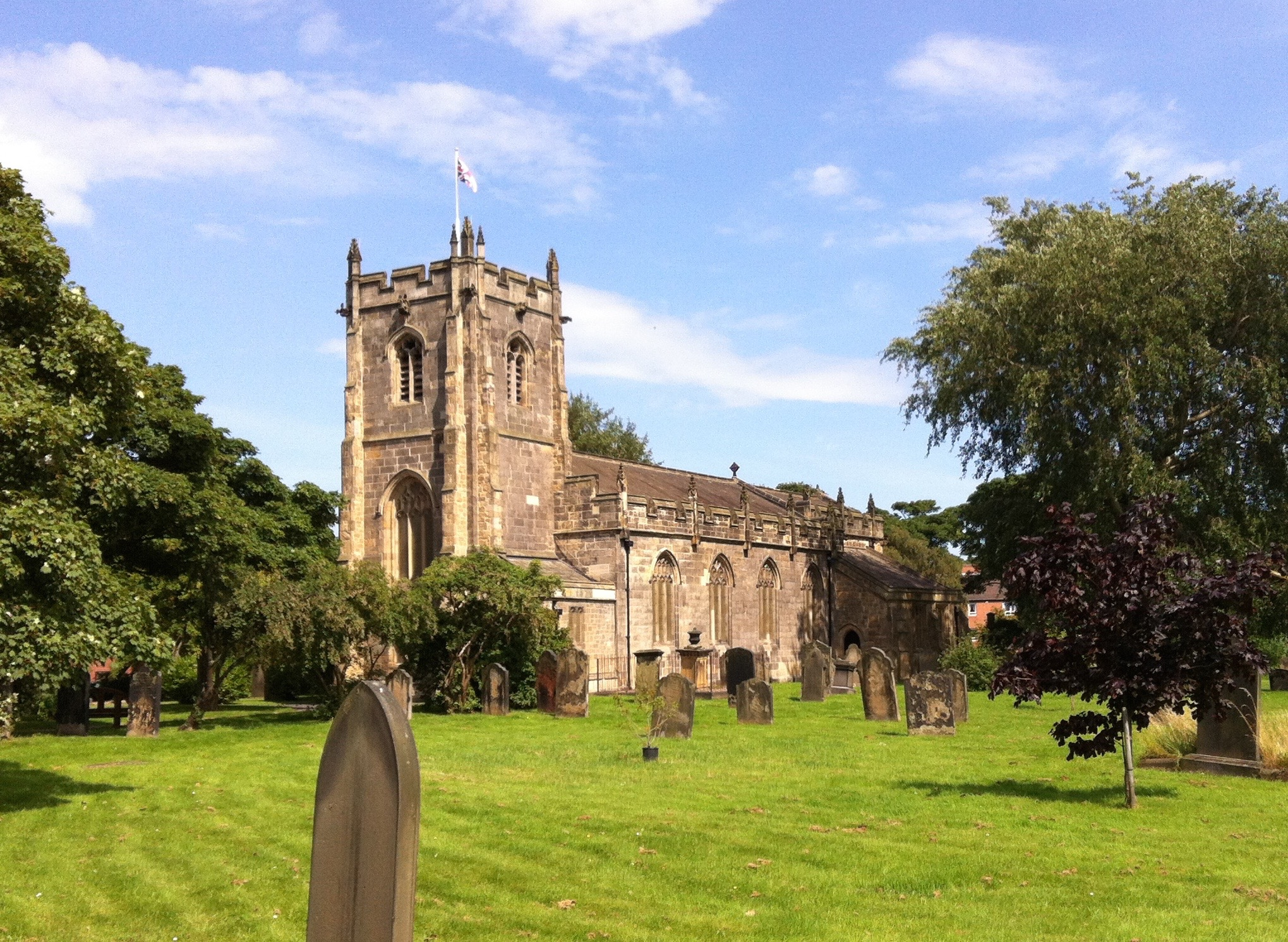
- St Peter's Wallsend
- 54.9940°N 1.5176°W
- Location: Church Bank, Wallsend
- Country: England
- Denomination: Church of England
- Churchmanship: Anglo-Catholic

History
- Founded: 1809
- Dedication: St Peter

Administration
- Province: York
- Diocese: Newcastle
- Archdeaconry: Northumberland
- Deanery: Tynemouth
- Parish: Wallsend St Peter and St Luke

The Church of St Peter is a Church of England Grade II* listed church located on the east side of Wallsend, North Tyneside. It was constructed to replace Holy Cross Church, which had been built c. 1150 but had fallen into disrepair by the end of the 18th century. The building was extensively remodelled in 1892 in the Perpendicular style to give it its present form. The parish church is the oldest in Wallsend

== History ==
By the 1790s the local authorities agreed a new church needed to be constructed, since Holy Cross Church, which had served the Wallsend community for centuries, had fallen into disrepair. With the only local church both roofless and unusable, services were instead being conducted in the local schoolroom. Progress was slow, however, with disagreements between Church and local property owners as to who should finance the construction, stalling the project until 1804. The matter was eventually resolved by a solicitor who suggested the money could be raised by means of a tontine. This unusual solution proved popular and ensured the necessary funds became available.

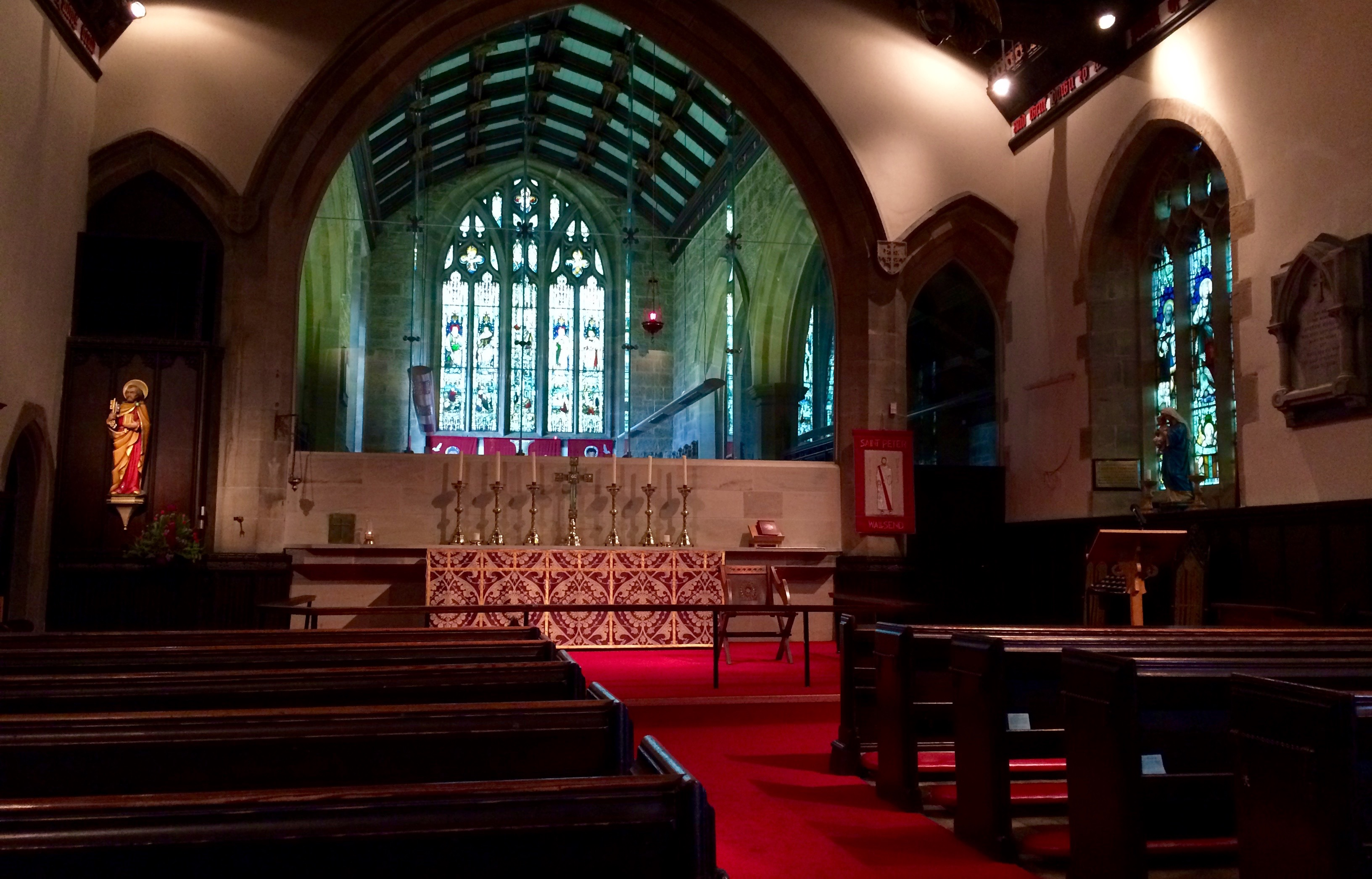
The Nave of St Peter's Church, Wallsend, facing East

No work was undertaken however until 1806, when it was realised that the schoolroom being used for public worship was neither consecrated nor licensed —meaning that marriages were not legal, the offspring of the unions illegitimate and the perpetual curate subject to serious legal penalties. A Bill was passed in the House of Commons in August 1807 in order to legitimise the marriages and their offspring, and to authorise the construction of a new church. The foundation stone of what would be a Georgian 'preaching box' was laid in November 1807 and the burial ground was consecrated in 1809. Major alterations were made in 1892 to give the church its current form.

It was clear by the 1980s that the Victorian chancel had serious structural problems, and questions were raised with regard to the feasibility of making the necessary repairs. At one point the church was threatened with closure. But during Fr Alan Clements's tenure (1995-2001) substantial grants were secured from English Heritage and the Heritage Lottery Fund. These enabled the chancel to be given robust foundations and all the attendant repairs to be made. The scheme entailed turning the chancel into a church hall, the Lady Chapel into a sacristy, and the vestries into a kitchen and cloakrooms. In 2001, the parish was amalgamated with that of St Luke, Wallsend into a single parish.

== Tradition ==
In the early years of Fr Armstrong's incumbency (1830-1871) the thinking of the Oxford Movement began to shape the life of the church, albeit strongly resisted initially by some parishioners. He was accused of having 'an exaggerated idea of the priesthood' and 'more zeal for ceremony than for vital religion'—both common accusations against clergy who accepted Tractarian thinking. But his determination over forty years laid the foundations on which his successors would build. The church maintains the tradition of Anglo-Catholicism today.

== Stained glass ==
One of the most notable features of the church is its collection of vivid stained glass by members of the Tower of Glass movement of the early 20th century.

An Túr Gloine (Tower of Glass) Windows in St Peter's

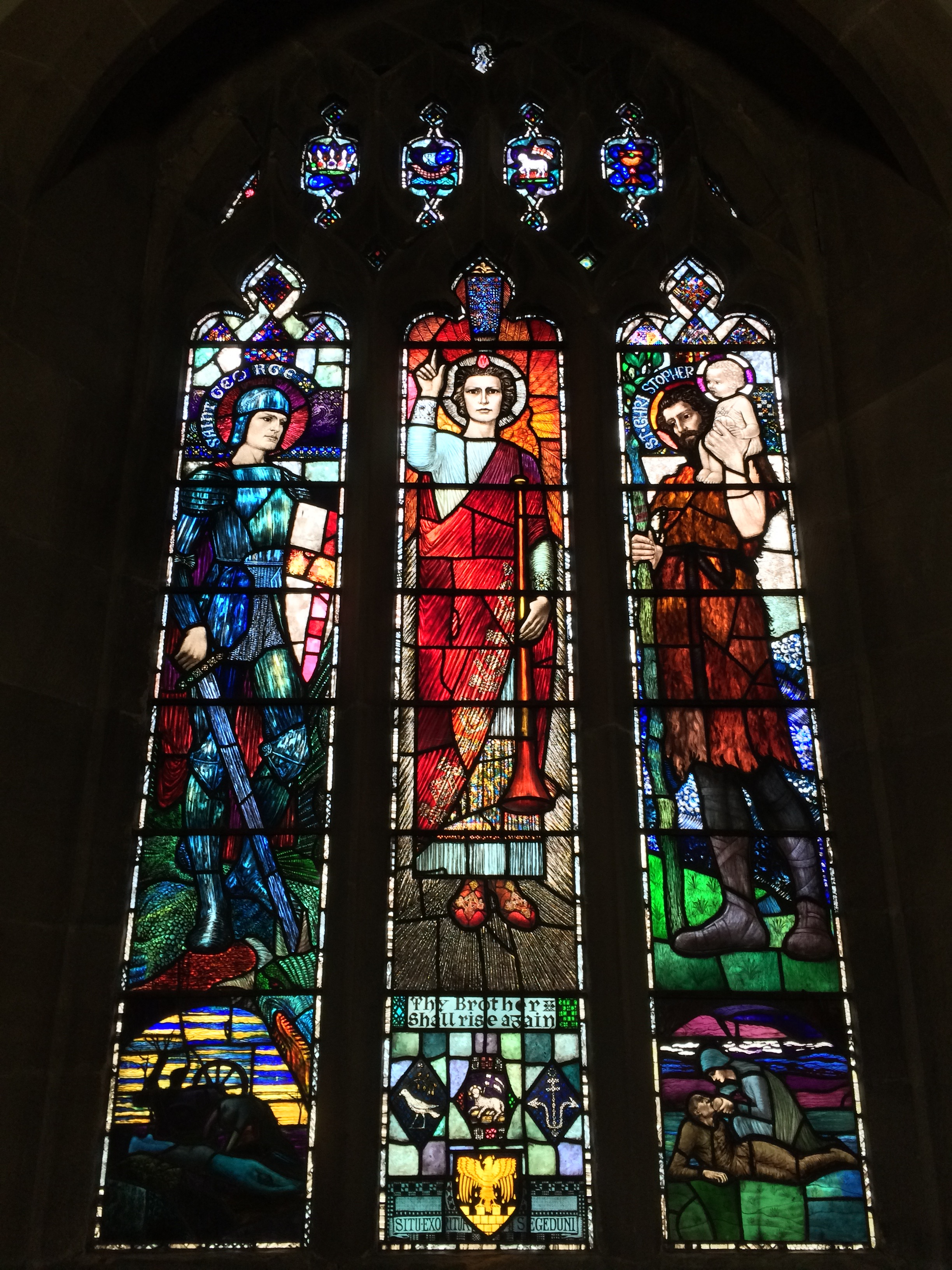
'Angel of the Resurrection, with St George and St Christopher'. Michael Healy, 1921

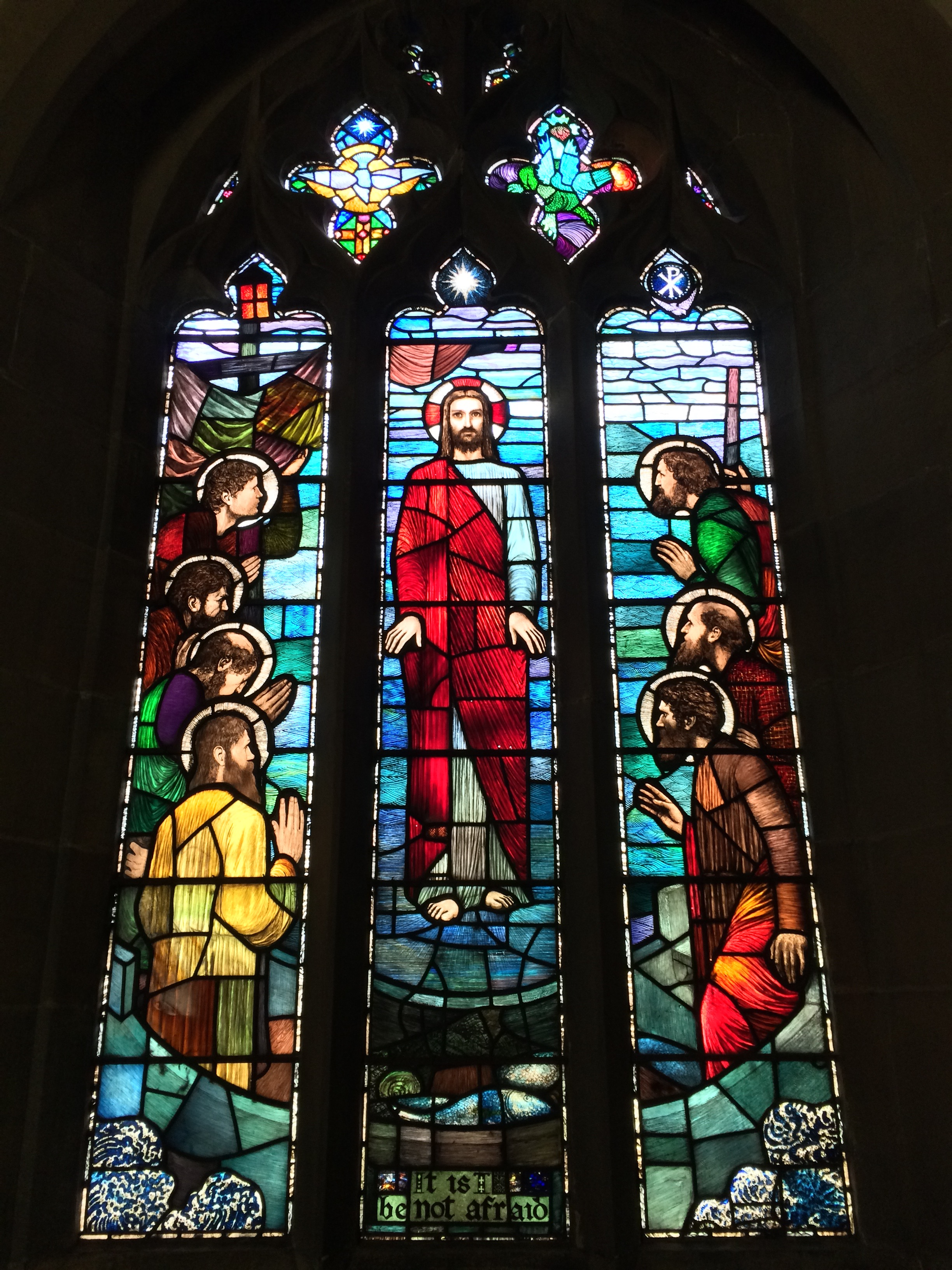
'Our Lord Walking on the Water', Michael Healy, 1921.

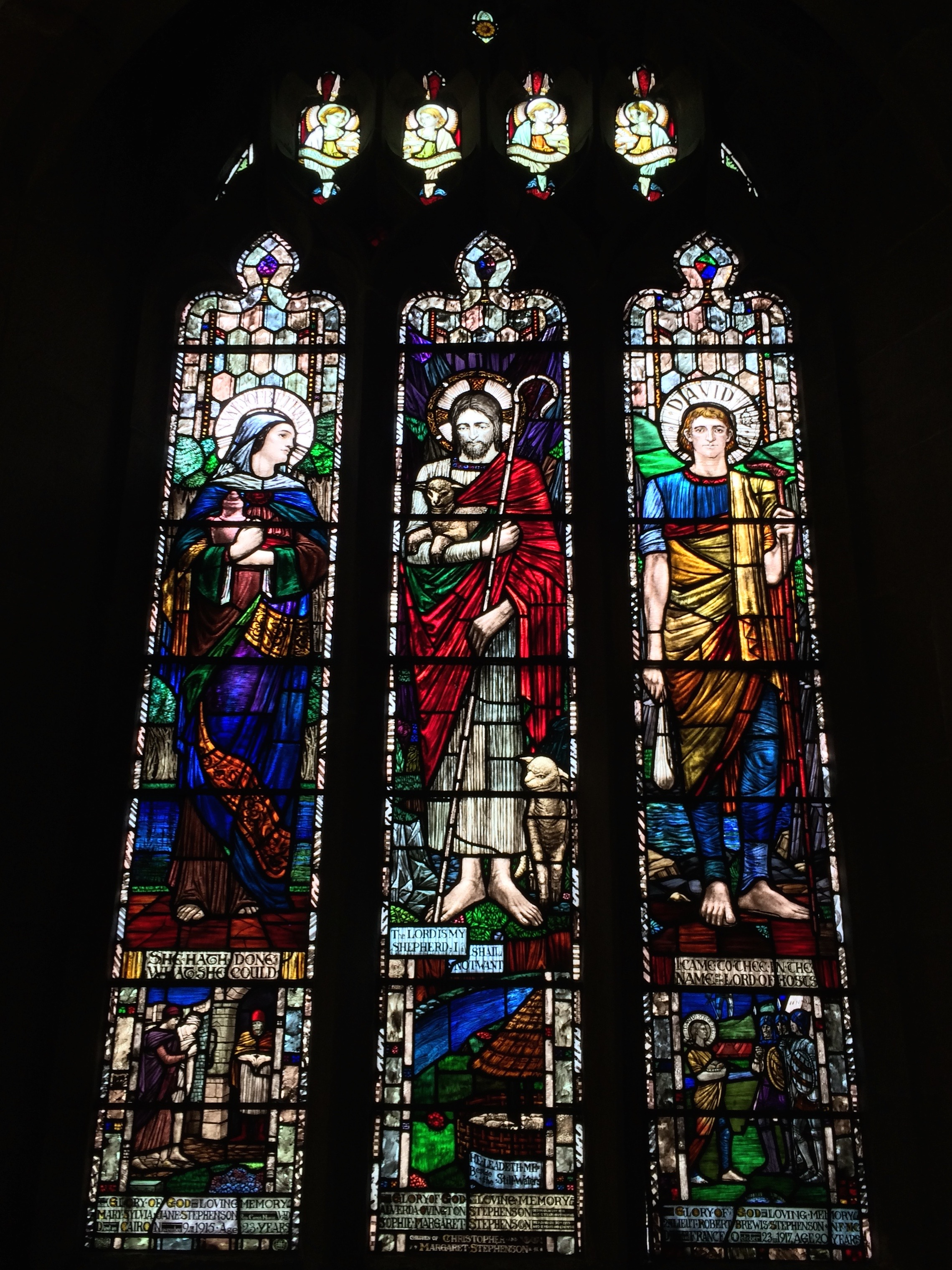
'The Good Shepherd, Mary of Bethany and David', Ethel Rhind, 1921.

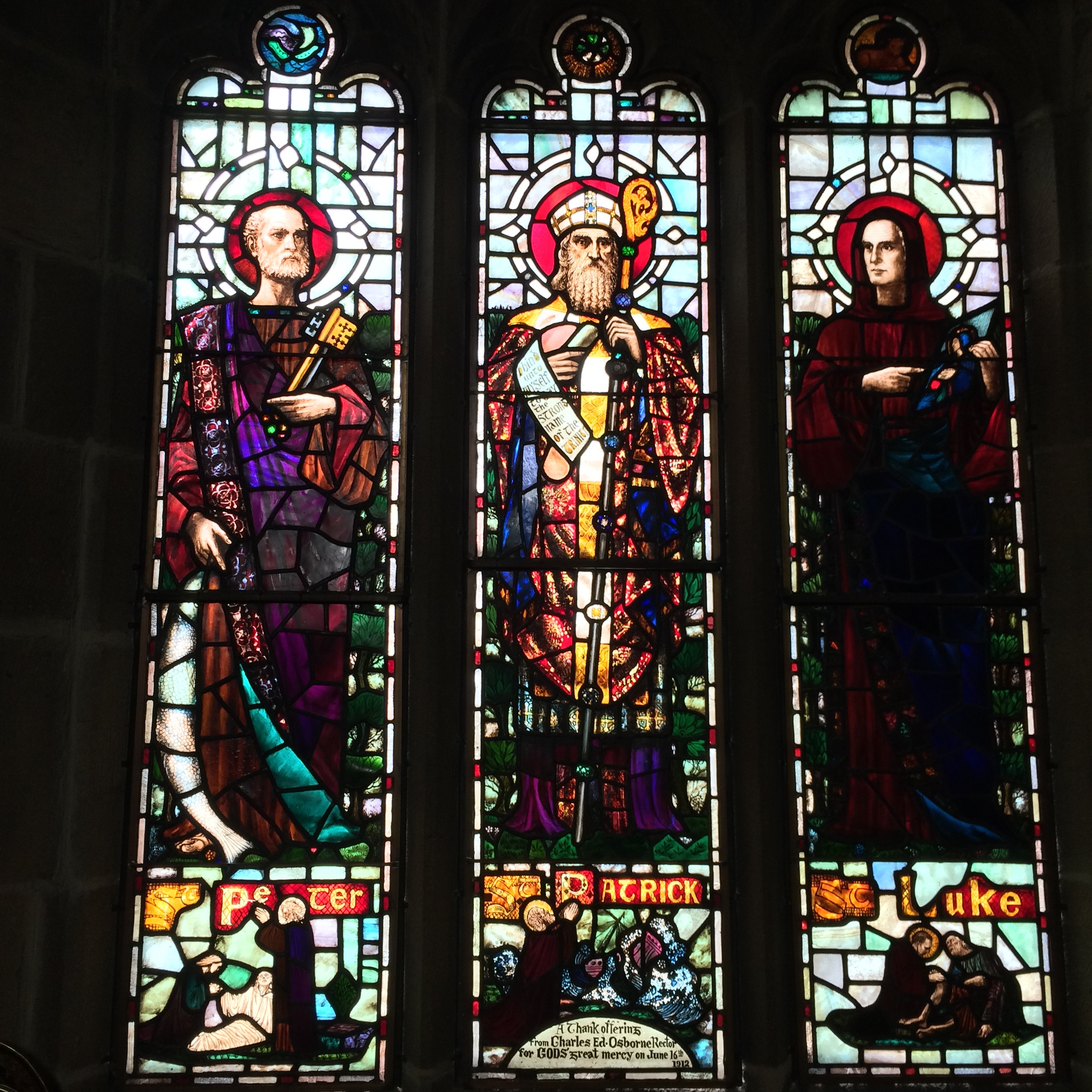
'St Peter, St Patrick and St Luke' Michael Healy, 1913.

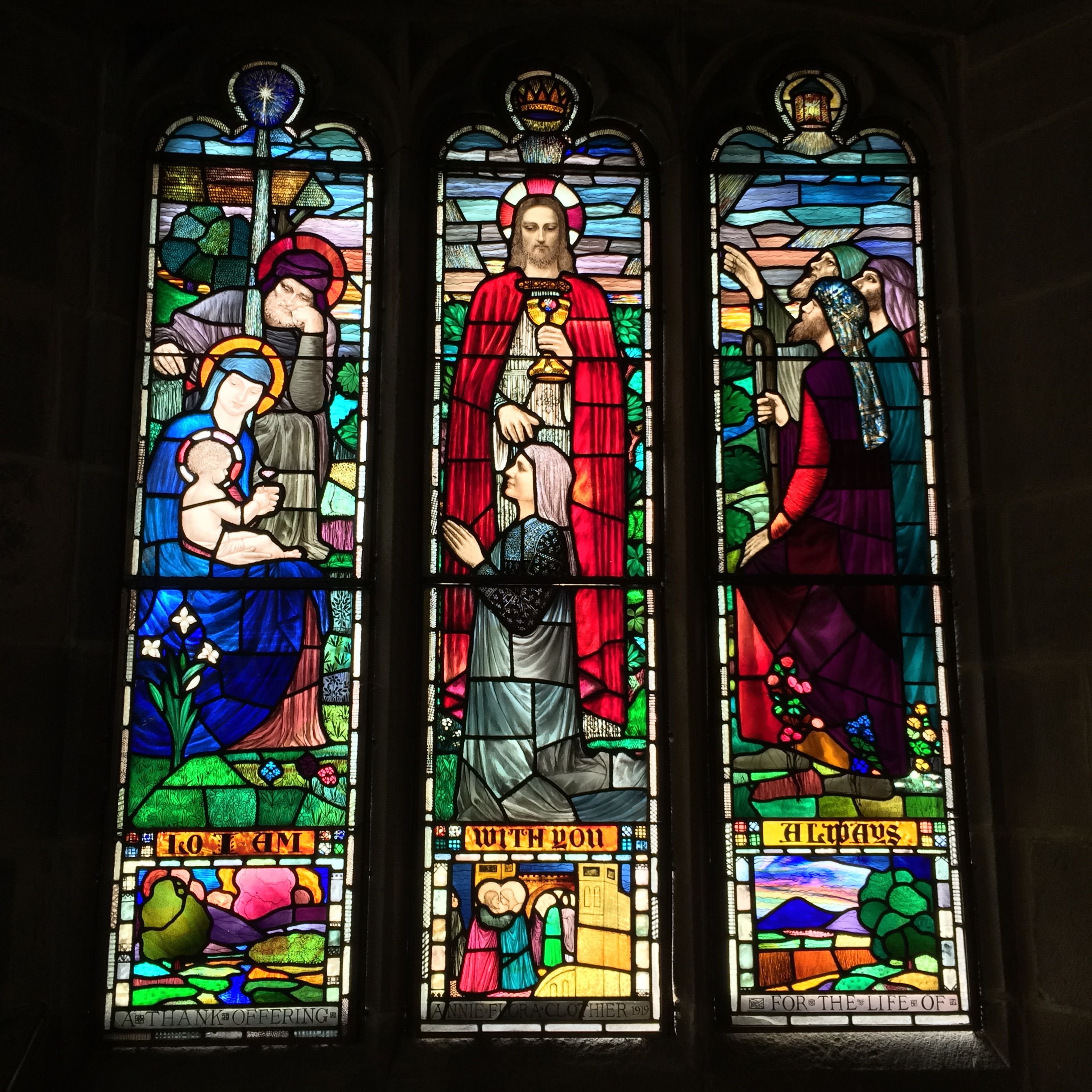
'Our Lord with the Nativity and the Shepherds', Michael Healy 1919.

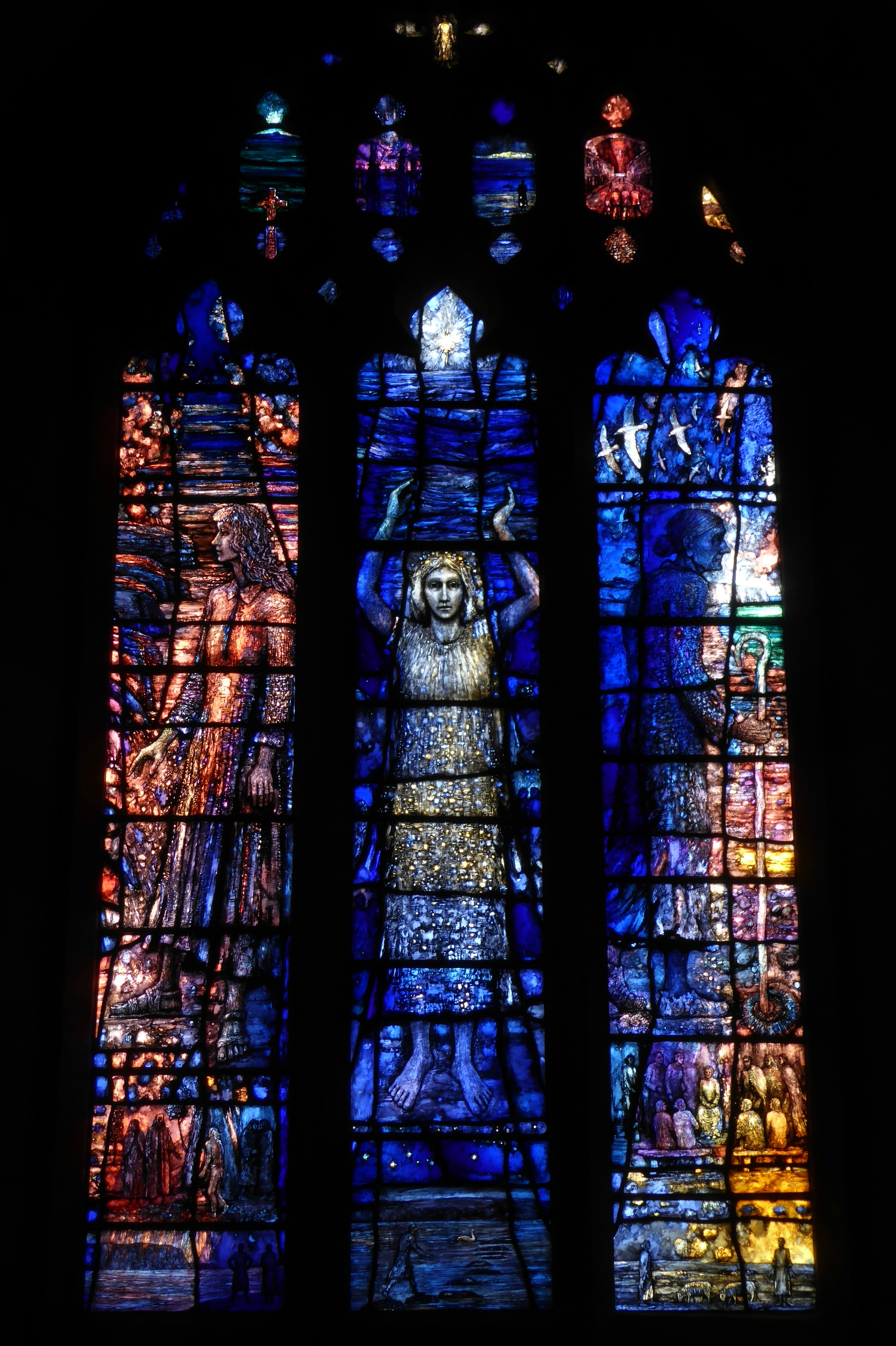
Stella Maris (Star of the Sea) Thomas Denny 2017

In 2017, Thomas Denny made and fitted the 'Stella Maris' window in the westernmost window on the south side of the nave. It is a belated thanksgiving for the church's bicentenary in 2009, paid for entirely by fundraising and gifts. It was dedicated on 6 May, the feast of St Eadfrith

== Other notable features ==
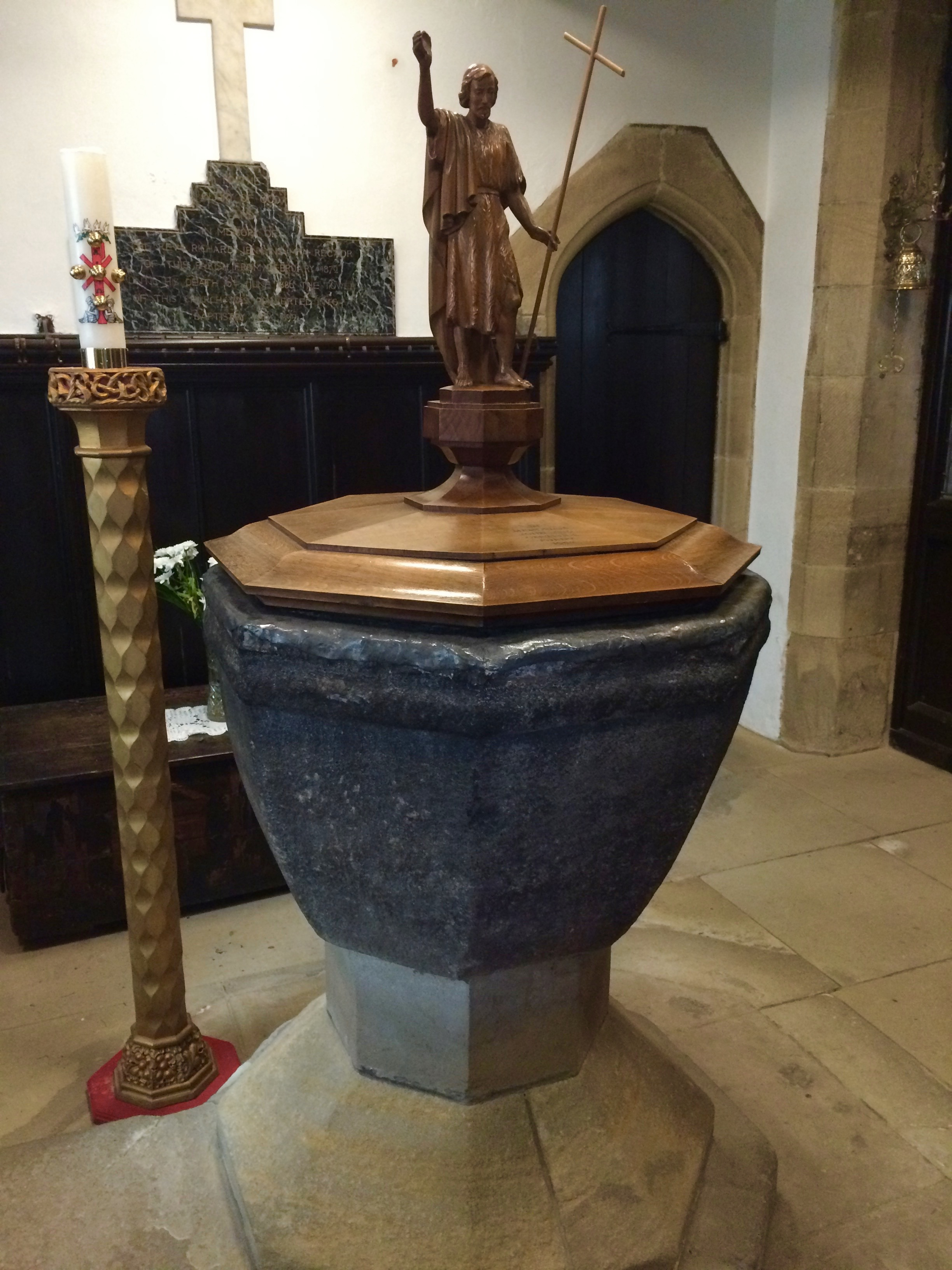
The font from Holy Cross Church

The font originally stood in Holy Cross Church, and would have been use by monks from Jarrow to baptise babies born in Wallsend. At some point after Holy Cross was abandoned the font found its way into Wallsend Burn (the stream which now forms the parish's northern boundary). It was rescued from there at some point in the 1800s and taken to Carville Hall, and eventually given to St Peter's by Wigham Richardson in 1891.

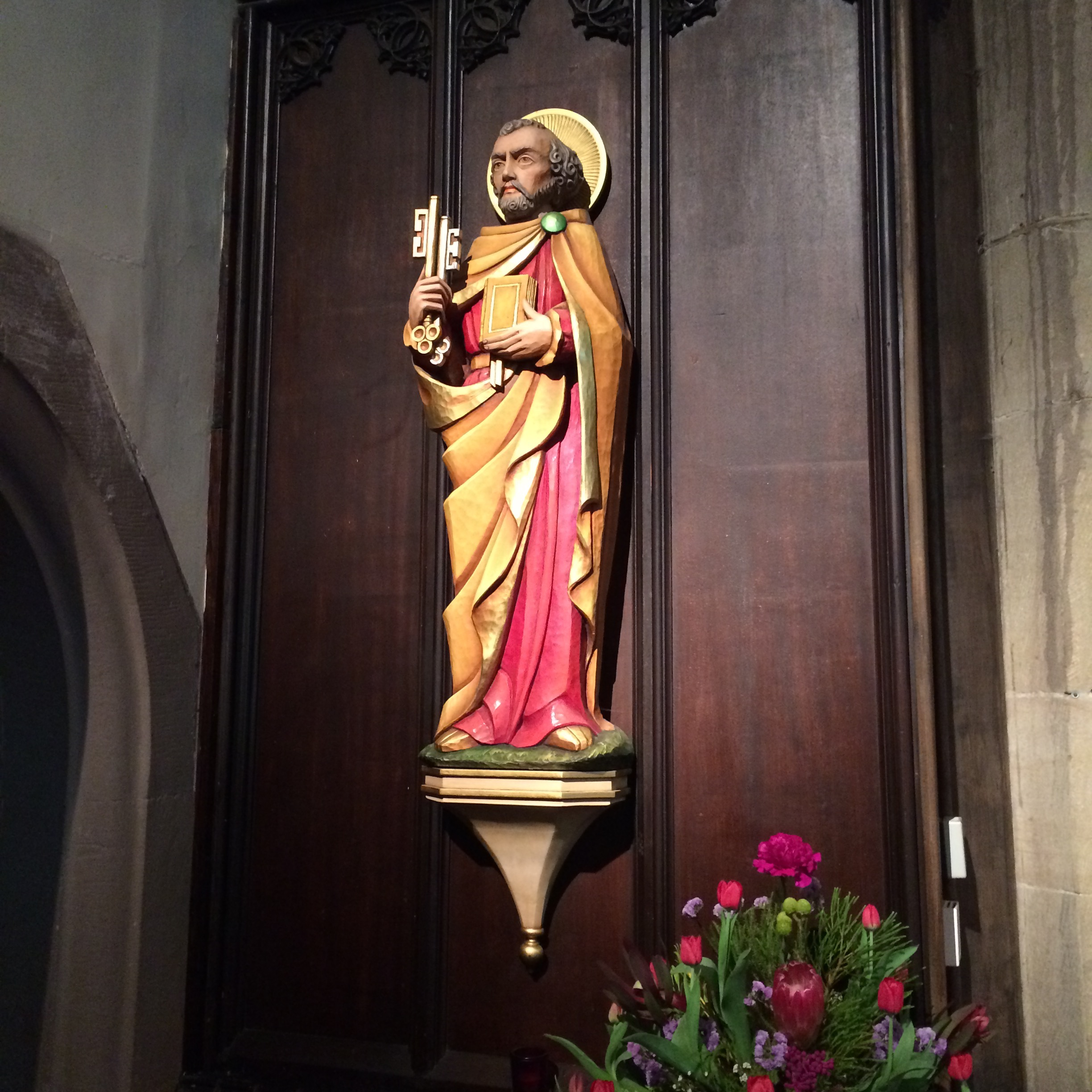
The statue of St Peter

The pipe organ is a Harrison & Harrison instrument of the Thomas Harrison period (1892).

The image of St Peter the Apostle to the north of the High Altar was commissioned by Fr Peter Strange.

Outside is a set of stocks, originally installed to discourage Sabbath-breaking. They are occasionally used for novelty wedding photographs.

Buried in unmarked graves in the churchyard are many victims of mining disasters, with memorial plaques commemorating both the Heaton Main Colliery Disaster of 1815 and the Wallsend Colliery Disaster of 1835.

There is also an old chest identified on the Antiques Roadshow as a Nonsuch chest from the 1580s, decorated with copies of plans from the palace that Henry VIII built in Surrey. The palace no longer exists but a few chests were known; one in the V&A and one in Southwark Cathedral, both in much better condition.

== Clergy ==
The souls of Wallsend were ministered to from an early stage by monks crossing the Tyne from St Paul's, Jarrow, one half of the Benedictine house of Monkwearmouth–Jarrow Abbey. From the Reformation until 1856 the parish priest was a perpetual curate, whereafter he became a titular rector by Orders in Council. The incumbent of the parish created by the amalgamation of Wallsend St Peter and Wallsend St Luke is its rector.

Perpetual curates

- 1541-1565 George Winter
- 1565-1598 Richard Raye
- 1598-1599 John Philpot
- 1599-1603 Richard Dearham
- 1603-1605 Richard Chambers
- 1605-1620 John Todd
- 1620-1628 George Rayne
- 1628-1664 Joseph Craddock
- 1664-1683 Anthony Proctor
- 1685-1703 Thomas Teasdale
- 1703-1718 Thomas Dockwray
- 1718-1759 Thomas Dockwray
- 1760-1789 Emmanuel Potter
- 1789-1830 Robert Blackett
- 1830-1856 John Armstrong

Rectors of Wallsend St Peter

- 1856-1871 John Armstrong
- 1872-1886 Richard Jenkins
- 1886-1906 James Henderson
- 1906-1936 Charles Osborne
- 1936-1943 Frank Hurst
- 1944-1969 Cecil Davis
- 1970-1979 David McCubbin
- 1979-1986 Peter Strange
- 1986-1992 John Dewar

Priests-in-Charge of Wallsend St Peter

- 1992-1994 John Ross
- 1995-2001 Alan Clements
- 2021 Alan Paterson

Rectors of Wallsend St Peter & St Luke

- 2002-2011 Michael Vine
- 2012-2019 David Sudron

Assistant Curates

- 1932-1937 Reginald Lee
- 1938-1941 Herbert Lenygon
- 1941-1943 Cheslyn Jones
- 1944-1948 William Nicholson
- 1948-1952 Colin Turnbull
- 1949-1954 Richard Norgate
- 1954-1958 David Moll
- 1956-1960 John Moore
- 1958-1963 Geoffrey Ashford
- 1960-1964 Colin Scott
- 1963-1966 Angus Palmer
- 1967-1969 Richard Jones
- 2006-2007 Stephen Gilham
- 2016-2020 Endre Kormos

== Today ==
The former chancel is used for social gatherings, and can be hired by local groups.

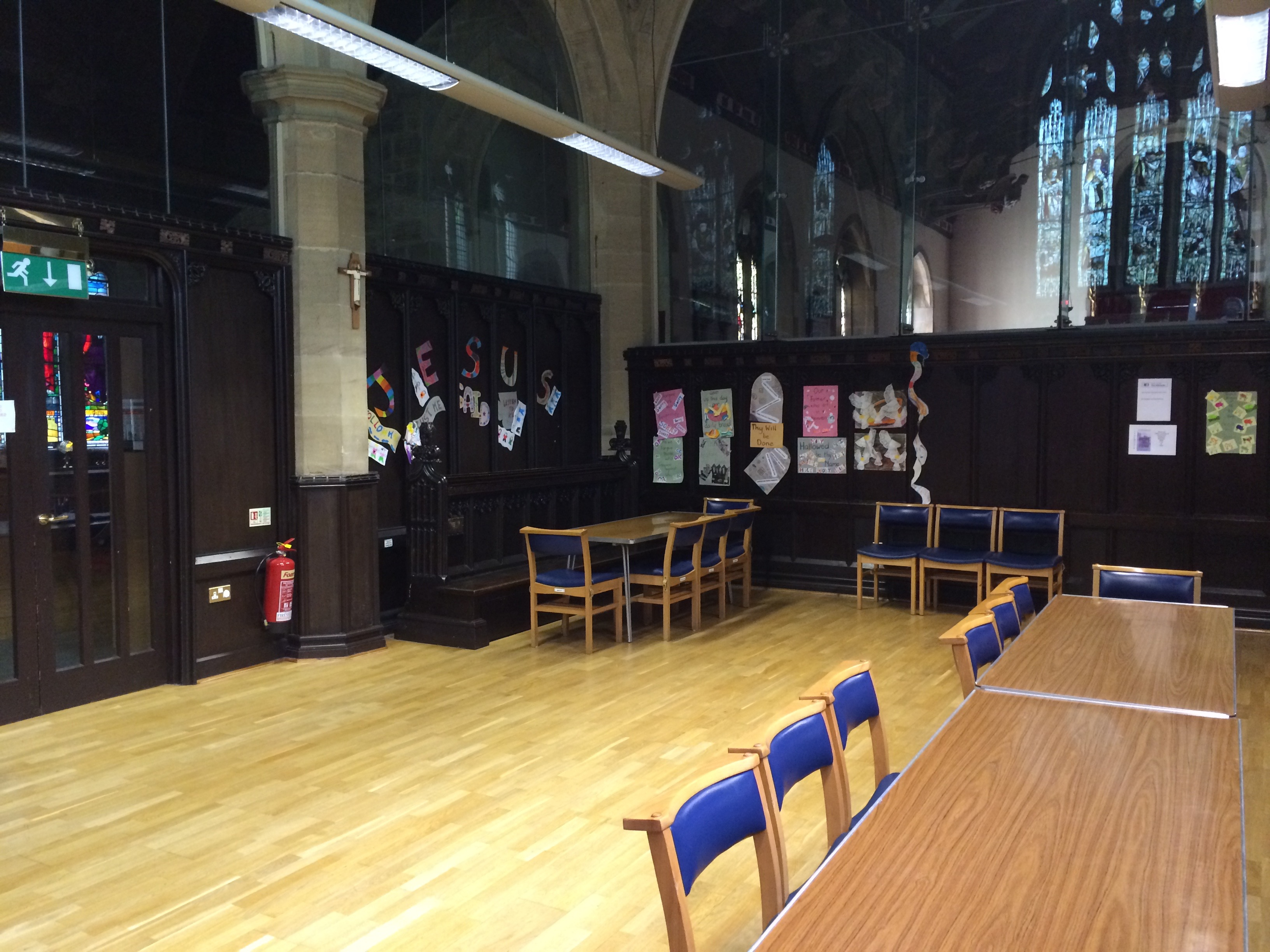
The former chancel looking south west

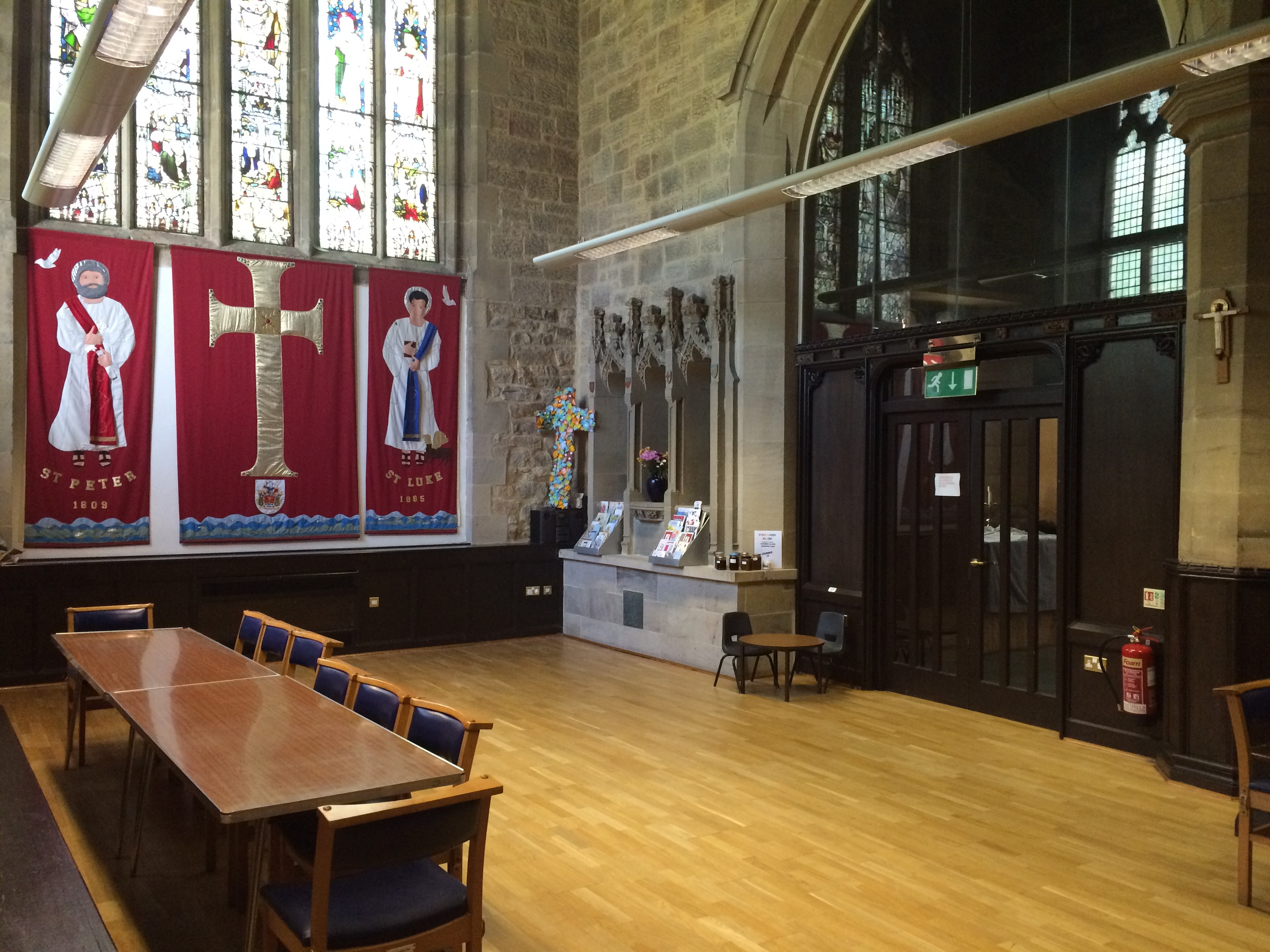
The former chancel looking south east
