= William Lucas (bishop) =

William Vincent Lucas was the inaugural Bishop of Masasi during the first half of the 20th century.

Born on 20 June 1883 and educated at Magdalen College School, Oxford and St Catherine's Society in the same city, he was made deacon on 23 December 1906, by George Kennion, Bishop of Bath and Wells, at Wells Cathedral. After a curacy at St Michael's Shepton Beauchamp he went to Tanzania as a missionary.

Lucas advocated taking traditional native rituals and adapting them for Christian use, although this work had already been started by native clergy and previous missionaries. Yoruban Bishop James Johnson had noted that the Church should be ‘not an exotic but a plant become indigenous to the soil’.

Lucas was later the provost and sub-dean of Masasi Collegiate Church and a canon of Zanzibar before his ordination to the episcopate. He was consecrated a bishop on Michaelmas (29 September) 1926, by Randall Davidson, Archbishop of Canterbury, at Westminster Abbey. He died on 8 July 1945.

== Legacy ==
Lucas is seen as the Father Founder of Chama Cha Mariamu Mtakatifu. St Stephen's House, Oxford displays a painting created by Lucas during his time at the university.

Religious titles
Preceded by Inaugural appointment	Bishop of Masasi; 1926–1944	Succeeded by Leslie Edward Stradling
