= Joseph Willard Mlele =

Joseph Williard Mlele was an Anglican bishop in Africa.

He was consecrated Assistant Bishop of South-West Tanganyika in 1963. He succeeded John Poole-Hughes in 1974.

He died in November 1994.
