= James Almasi =

Tanzanian bishop

James Almasi is the current Anglican Bishop of Masasi.
