= Chama Cha Mariamu Mtakatifu =

The Chama cha Mariamu Mtakatifu (Community of St. Mary of Nazareth and Calvary), (CMM) is a large Anglican religious order operating within the Anglican Church of Tanzania, and with its headquarters at Masasi, Tanzania.

== History ==
Women religious were first introduced to Tanzania by clergy missionaries of the Universities' Mission to Central Africa, working in conjunction with the sisters of the Community of the Sacred Passion (CSP). The Order was formally recognised in 1946, and then in 1968 gained independence from CSP, and became the autonomous CMM. Today the sisters focus their work on caring for parish churches, administering and teaching in primary schools, and outreach to hospitals, prisons, and the disadvantaged. They engage in agriculture, and also produce community wares for sale, including vestments, altar breads, and candles.

== Structure ==
The Order reported around 120 sisters in membership at the start of 2012. There is a Sister Superior for each convent, or regional group of nearby convents. At the head of the Order is an elected Reverend Mother Superior - currently Reverend Mother Gloria Prisca CMM (elected 2004). There is a Bishop Visitor, who is one of the diocesan bishops of the Anglican Church of Tanzania.

== Convents ==
The mother house is The Convent, Kilimani, in Masasi, Tanzania. In 2024 there are twelve convents in total, eleven in Tanzania, and one in Zambia, where the Order is seeking to expand. Mass is offered daily, and the sisters (at all convents) recite a four-fold daily office of Morning Prayer, Midday Prayer, Evening Prayer, and Night Prayer (Compline). The current convents are located at (or near to) the following locations, which are all in Tanzania unless stated otherwise:

- Dar es Salaam
- Kilimani (mother house)
- Korogwe
- Kwa Mkono Handeni
- Liuli
- Mkushi (Zambia)
- Mtandi
- Mtwara
- Newala
- Njombe
- Sayuni Msima
- Tanga

== Works ==
The Order undertakes a number of projects including several kindergartens, a health centre, a hostel for teenagers and a model farm.

== See also ==
- William Lucas (bishop)
- Frank Weston (bishop of Zanzibar)
