= Patrick Mwachiko =

Patrick Mwachiko (born 1948) was the Anglican Bishop of Masasi: he retired in 2013.
