= Anglican Diocese of South-West Tanganyika =

The Anglican Diocese of South-West Tanganyika is one of 28 dioceses within the Anglican Church of Tanzania.

== History ==
It was created in 1952, its first Bishop was Leslie Stradling. After Michael Westall's return to the United Kingdom the Episcopal See was vacant for a time before the appointment of John Simalenga. After his death, Matthew Mhagama, who had served under Bishop Michael Westall, was appointed bishop.

The office of the diocese is in the regional centre of Njombe. The diocese operates a hospital and Bible School in the outlying centre of Milo. The postal address of the diocese is PO Box 32 Njombe.

In 2022, the current bishop was Matthew Mhagama.

== See also ==
Joseph Willard Mlele
