= Anglican Diocese of Masasi =

The Anglican Diocese of Masasi is one of 28 dioceses within the Anglican Church of Tanzania. The diocese was created in 1926 and its first bishop was William Lucas. Another, in 1960–1968, was Trevor Huddleston. The previous bishop was Patrick Mwachiko and the current bishop, James Almasi, was consecrated on 29 September 2014.

After some years of preparation, the diocese was erected by dividing the area of the Diocese of Zanzibar south of the Rufiji; the division was affected by the Universities' Mission to Central Africa at their Annual General Meeting in May 1926. The Diocese of Newala was founded by dividing Masasi diocese in September 2009.
