= Ronald Woomer =

American convicted spree killer (1954–1990)

- Woomer in prison visiting room
- Born: Ronald Raymond Woomer; 1954; Huntington, West Virginia, U.S.
- Died: April 27, 1990 (aged 35); Broad River Correctional Institution, South Carolina, U.S.
- Status: Executed by electrocution
- Convictions: Murder (3 counts); Assault and battery with intent to kill Kidnapping; First degree criminal sexual conduct
- Penalty: Death

Details
- Victims: 4
- Date: February 22, 1979
- Country: United States
- Location: South Carolina (1979)
- Imprisoned at: Broad River Correctional Institution (Note: Woomer was originally incarcerated on death row at the Central Correctional Institution before the death row and execution chamber were moved to the Broad River Correctional Institution since it began to operate in 1988.)

Ronald Raymond Woomer (1954 – April 27, 1990) was an American convicted spree killer. In February 1979, Woomer and an accomplice Eugene Skaar travelled from West Virginia to South Carolina to commit robbery and murder. The duo first robbed and killed coin collector John Turner in Cottageville, before they went to Georgetown County and fatally shot both Arnie Lee Richardson and his sister-in-law, Earldean Wright, and wounded Richardson's five-year-old daughter. In their third and final offense at Horry County, Skaar and Woomer abducted two female convenience store clerks, who were both raped and shot by the men, leading to the death of Della Louise Sellers and left Wanda Summers injured.

Soon after the crime spree, Woomer was arrested at a hotel by the police while Skaar committed suicide to avoid capture. Woomer was brought to trial for the kidnapping, rape and murder of Sellers, and sentenced to death on July 20, 1979. Woomer was also convicted of the murder of Turner and sentenced to death, but his conviction was vacated upon appeal, while he received two life sentences for killing Richardson and Wright. Subsequently, despite a re-trial and several more appeals, Woomer was ultimately executed by the electric chair at the Broad River Correctional Institution on April 27, 1990.

== Personal life ==
Ronald Raymond Woomer, also known as Rusty, was born in 1954 in Huntington, West Virginia. According to court sources and the media, Woomer did not have a happy childhood, because his father was an alcoholic who did not have steady employment and never showed concern or interest towards his wife and four children. Woomer and his brothers were abused by their father from a young age, which mostly consisted of beatings with a belt and being forcibly sent into their rooms as punishment for any misbehaviors.

== Murders in 1979 ==
In February 1979, 24-year-old Ronald Woomer and 40-year-old Eugene Skaar embarked on a violent crime spree in South Carolina that led to four murders.

John Turner

After leaving their native state of West Virginia for South Carolina on February 20, 1979, Woomer and Skaar first committed robbery and murder by targeting John Turner, a coin collector who resided in Cottageville, Colleton County. The men entered the home of Turner on the evening of February 22, 1979, robbing Turner of a coin collection and some clothing before Woomer shot and killed the 67-year-old man with a pistol.

Arnie Lee Richardson, Earldean Wright and Diane Richardson

Two hours after Turner's murder, Skaar and Woomer traveled to a rural area of Georgetown County, where they approached 27-year-old Arnie Lee Richardson as he worked on a truck outside his home. They proceeded to hold Richardson and two of his family members hostage, robbing them before shooting all three with a shotgun. Robertson and his 35-year-old mentally-handicapped sister-in-law, Earldean Wright, (Note: Some sources spelt her name as "Earl Dean Wright".) were killed, while Richardson's four-year-old daughter, Diane, was the sole survivor. The girl, who sustained a minor gunshot wound on the head, managed to make a police report after escaping to the nearby home of her aunt.

Della Louise Sellers and Wanda Summers

Shortly after the triple shooting of Richardson and his family, both Woomer and Skaar entered a convenience store in Pawleys Island, where they held two female convenience store clerks and several customers at gunpoint. After ordering the two clerks to open the cash register, Skaar and Woomer left the store in their getaway vehicle with the two clerks as their hostages.

After driving to Horry County, Woomer and Skaar disregarded the pleas of the clerks to release them, and instead, they both raped the clerks, and shot them both with a shotgun. After the duo left, one of the clerks, 24-year-old Wanda Summers, whose lower jaw was destroyed by the gunshot wound, managed to seek help from a nearby house, and an ambulance arrived to take Summers and her companion to the hospital. However, Summers's colleague, 34-year-old Della Louise Sellers, died from a shotgun wound to the head, and while Summers survived, she was permanently disfigured.

== Murder trials of Woomer ==
=== Arrest and charges ===
After the murder of Della Sellers, both Eugene Skaar and Ronald Woomer returned to their motel in Myrtle Beach. By then, the Myrtle Beach Police Department were alerted of the rampage killings and linked the men to the crimes. About 50 police officers were dispatched to the motel to round up the pair. Woomer surrendered himself and was thus arrested, but Skaar turned the gun on himself and committed suicide to avoid capture.

Following Skaar's death, Woomer was solely charged with the murders of all four victims, and the prosecution announced their intent to seek the death penalty for Woomer. Further investigation revealed that the initial killing of Turner had been orchestrated by two additional individuals. Fred Whitehead and John Fisher – a former Republican official from West Virginia – were found to have enlisted Woomer and Skaar to carry out a robbery targeting Turner's coin collection. Both men were subsequently arrested; Fisher received a five-year prison sentence, while Whitehead was sentenced to 25 years for their involvement in the crime. (Note: Whitehead originally faced a more severe charge of conspiracy to commit murder.)

=== Trial proceedings and sentences ===
On July 16, 1979, Woomer stood trial for the murder of Della Sellers, with jury selection taking place the week before her trial, and the reporters were barred from attending a pre-trial hearing of his case.

On July 19, 1979, after a three-day trial, the jury found Woomer guilty of the murder of Sellers, in addition to the charges of assault and battery with intent to kill, kidnapping and first-degree criminal sexual conduct. Woomer reportedly claimed beforehand that he was influenced by drugs and alcohol at the time of the murders, and he himself was horrified by the full extent of his crimes.

On July 20, 1979, the jury unanimously voted for the death penalty after two hours of deliberation. On that same day, Circuit Judge David Harwell formally sentenced Woomer to death by electrocution. In his verdict, Judge Harwell stated that the violence and cruelty unleashed by Woomer was beyond his imagination and hence opted for the death penalty. Woomer was additionally sentenced to life plus 50 years for raping and attacking Wanda Summers in the same case.

Woomer's second murder trial, related to the death of John Turner, was conducted in June 1980. Likewise, the jury found him guilty, and Woomer was sentenced to death by Circuit Judge Dan Laney upon the jury's unanimous recommendation for capital punishment, thus marking his second death sentence for the spree killings in 1979.

As for the other charges of killing Arnie Richardson and Earl Dean Wright, Woomer pleaded guilty in a third trial after his lawyers reached a plea bargain with the prosecution, and he was sentenced to life imprisonment on both counts.

Woomer was one of 20 people who were sentenced to death between October 1977 and March 1981, after the state of South Carolina passed a new death penalty law to replace its previous death penalty laws, which were declared unconstitutional in 1976.

== Re-sentencing and appeal process ==
=== First appeal and re-sentencing ===
On April 28, 1981, after hearing Ronald Woomer's direct appeal against his death sentence for the murder of Della Sellers, the South Carolina Supreme Court overturned the death sentence by a 4–1 decision and ordered a re-sentencing trial, after the judges found that the original trial judge made insufficient instructions to the jury and the prosecution made improper arguments in seeking the death penalty, which remained as an option in Woomer's re-sentencing trial.

Woomer's re-sentencing hearing was scheduled on July 14, 1981, and jury selection happened on that same day. The taped confession was reportedly played in the re-trial and the defense argued for judicial mercy on the grounds of Woomer's troubled childhood, with Woomer's mother corroborating this evidence. At the end of the re-trial, Woomer was once again sentenced to death on July 23, 1981.

=== Further appeals ===
Meanwhile, Woomer also appealed against his second death sentence for the murder of John Turner. On November 10, 1981, the South Carolina Supreme Court allowed his appeal and overturned both his conviction and sentence for the John Turner case, after finding there were errors in the trial. A re-trial was also ordered for Turner. However, the prosecutor, Randolph Murdaugh Jr., stated that he was undecided on whether to seek a new trial for Woomer, considering that he was already condemned to death row for the murder of Sellers, and in the end, the state prosecutors did not seek a re-trial for Turner's murder.

On December 20, 1982, the South Carolina Supreme Court dismissed the appeal of Woomer against his one remaining death sentence for the murder of Sellers.

On March 31, 1986, by a 7–2 decision, the U.S. Supreme Court rejected Woomer's appeal and affirmed both his death sentence and conviction for murdering Sellers.

On September 14, 1988, the 4th Circuit Court of Appeals turned down Woomer's appeal.

On March 20, 1989, Woomer's final appeal was denied by the U.S. Supreme Court.

== Execution ==
=== 1989 execution attempt ===
After Ronald Woomer exhausted all his appeals, the South Carolina Attorney-General Thomas T. Medlock (or Travis Medlock) filed a motion to the South Carolina Supreme Court in May 1989 to schedule an execution date for Woomer, which was estimated to be as early as June 9, 1989.

Subsequently, Woomer's first death warrant was signed on May 24, 1989, and his execution was ordered to be carried out on June 16, 1989. Woomer filed appeals to stave off his execution, but the South Carolina Supreme Court refused to issue a stay of execution, and the South Carolina Governor Carroll Campbell refused to grant clemency to Woomer.

As the scheduled execution of Woomer drew near, Sellers's husband told the press that he waited for ten years and wanted Woomer to be executed for his late wife's murder, and he described the three years of marriage with Sellers as the best of his life.

About 13 hours before the execution could proceed, the U.S. Supreme Court granted a stay of execution to Woomer on June 15, 1989. This allowed Woomer to file another appeal, in which Woomer's lawyers argued that the state had withheld evidence that were crucial to prove that Woomer suffered an alleged drug-induced psychosis at the time of the murder.

=== 1990 death warrant and execution ===
On March 26, 1990, the U.S. Supreme Court dismissed Woomer's fourth appeal. The South Carolina Attorney-General, Travis Medlock, sought another execution date soon after the dismissal of Woomer's appeal. On April 3, 1990, the execution of Woomer was rescheduled to be carried out on April 27, 1990.

After Woomer received his second death warrant, his lawyers filed last-minute appeals in order to delay the execution. A federal appellate court rejected Woomer's appeal on April 9, 1990. On April 26, 1990, the eve of Woomer's scheduled execution, the U.S. Supreme Court denied Woomer's final appeal by a 7–2 vote and at the same time, Governor Campbell rejected a second and final clemency petition from Woomer.

On April 27, 1990, 35-year-old Ronald Raymond Woomer was put to death by the electric chair at the Broad River Correctional Institution.

Prior to his execution, Woomer received final visits from his father, brother and two sisters, and he also expressed remorse for his actions, and was at peace with his execution. Woomer also stated that he hoped for the pain and suffering of his victims' loved ones to end with his death in a final interview before his execution. The electric chair was reportedly activated at 1:05 am, and Woomer was pronounced dead seven minutes later at 1:12 am. In his final statement before the electric chair was switched on, Woomer said:

I'm sorry. I claim Jesus Christ as my Saviour. I only wish everyone could feel the love I feel for Him.

Woomer was the first condemned inmate to be executed in the Broad River Correctional Institution after the prison first opened in 1988, with the original death chamber and electric chair being moved from Central Correctional Institution to the new prison.

The execution drew cheers from the crowd of death penalty supporters and the relatives of Woomer's victims as they gathered outside the prison and saw the hearse bearing the body departing from the death house. Sellers's husband told the press that he found the death of Woomer to be too easy. Earldean Wright's brother stated in response that he was relieved to know that Woomer would never harm another person again. Simultaneously, a vigil was held in opposition to the execution of Woomer.

== Aftermath ==
Ronald Woomer was the third person to be executed in South Carolina since the state's resumption of capital punishment in 1985. Before him, two convicted murderers, Joseph Carl Shaw and his juvenile accomplice James Terry Roach, were executed by the electric chair on January 11, 1985, and January 10, 1986, respectively.

In the aftermath of her abduction, Wanda Summers, the surviving victim in the murder of Della Sellers, had to undergo seven surgeries to repair the physical injuries on her face. Summers revealed in a February 1980 interview that she remained traumatised by the ordeal but it brought her and her family closer. In September 1989, three months after the execution of Woomer was delayed, Summers personally travelled to Washington upon a senator's invitation to testify before a Senate panel about her traumatic experience and stated how she felt let down by the judicial system due to the delay of Woomer's execution on the grounds of a technicality error and the long appellate process.

In 2001, authors Billy Hills and Dale Hudson co-wrote and published a book titled A Reason to Live: The True Story of One Woman's Love, Courage and Determination to Survive. The book chronicled the abduction and survival of Wanda Summers, and her path to recovery and finding closure and healing.

== See also ==
- Capital punishment in South Carolina
- List of people executed in South Carolina
- List of people executed in the United States in 1990

Executions carried out in South Carolina
Preceded by James Terry Roach January 10, 1986	Ronald Woomer; April 27, 1990	Succeeded by Donald Henry Gaskins September 6, 1991
Executions carried out in the United States
Preceded by Jerome Butler – Texas April 21, 1990	Ronald Woomer – South Carolina; April 27, 1990	Succeeded by Jesse Tafero – Florida May 4, 1990
