= Beyond Belief: Fact or Fiction =

American television anthology series

- Genre: Science fiction Paranormal
- Created by: Lynn Lehmann
- Presented by: James Brolin (1997); Jonathan Frakes (1998–2002, 2021–present)
- Narrated by: Don LaFontaine (1997–2000); Campbell Lane (2002); Eberhard Prüfer (2021–present)
- Theme music composer: Al Kasha
- Composers: Al Kasha; Mark Northam; David E. Russo; Tim Simonec; Steve Zuckerman; Robert Alpert
- Countries of origin: United States (1997–2000); United States/Canada (2002); United States/Germany (2021–present)
- Original language: English
- No. of seasons: 6
- No. of episodes: 57 (274 Segments)

Production
- Executive producers: Barry Adelman; Dick Clark; Al Schwartz
- Running time: 7–9 Minutes (Individual Segments); 44–45 minutes

Original release
- Network: Fox
- Release: May 25, 1997 – September 5, 2002
- Network: RTL Zwei
- Release: October 31, 2021 – present

Beyond Belief: Fact or Fiction is an American television anthology series created by Lynn Lehmann, presented by Dick Clark Productions, and produced and aired by the Fox network from 1997 to 2002. Each episode features stories, all of which appear to defy logic, and some of which are allegedly based on actual events. The viewer is offered the challenge of determining which are true and which are false. At the end of the show, it is revealed to the viewer whether the tales were true or works of fiction.

The series was hosted by James Brolin in season one and by Jonathan Frakes from season two onwards. The show was narrated by Don LaFontaine for the first three seasons and by Campbell Lane for the fourth season.

Beginning in 2021, new episodes began to be produced for German channel RTL II, hosted by Frakes, and narrated by Eberhard Prüfer.

== Format ==
The stories told in the program all have some connection with the supernatural, ghosts, psychic phenomena, coincidences, destiny, or other such unusual occurrences.

Each episode of the show, as well as all stories within, are introduced with a pun or some other form of witticism pertaining to the particular story and episode, and they all include the underlying moral that not everything we perceive as truth and falsehood is as such, and that it can often be difficult to truly separate fact from fiction, hence the show's title. Since the Frakes era, the intros are filmed on a set resembling the interior of a Victorian mansion.

Each episode typically features five stories, at least one of which is supposedly true and at least one of which is a complete fabrication. The majority of true stories on the show are based on first-hand research conducted by author Robert Tralins yet mostly perpetuate hearsay or urban legends as facts, while many of the ones that turned out to be false are either completely fictional or modern-dressed re-tellings of untrue urban legends.

From season two onwards Jonathan Frakes would end each story with a pun related to the story, while James Brolin always retold a story instead of showing a clip.

== Popularity, cancellation and revivals ==
Beyond Belief: Fact or Fiction had a sporadic airing schedule on its original networks, sometimes going for weeks or even months between airings. There is a two-year lag between Don LaFontaine and Campbell Lane's stints as narrator for the show, during which time it was believed that it had been cancelled, only for it to be brought back for another season in the summer of 2002. It was cancelled after its 2002 season. During his stint as narrator, Lane played the character John August in the Season 4 segment 'The Cigar Box'.

In Germany, where Beyond Belief: Fact or Fiction is known as X-Factor: Das Unfassbare (The Unfathomable), the show was especially successful and still has a cult following. This led to the X-Factor brand being extended to other shows: The Paranormal Borderline became X-Factor: Die fünfte Dimension (The Fifth Dimension), X-Factor: Wahre Lügen (True Lies) is a German series, and Scariest Places on Earth became X-Factor: Die wahre Dimension der Angst (The Real Dimension of Fear).

Starting on 4 November 2018, to celebrate the 20th anniversary of the series' premiere in Germany, RTL II produced two special episodes under the name X-Factor: Das Unfassbare kehrt zurück (The Unfathomable Returns), hosted by Detlef Bothe. While directly copying much of the original's style and studio setup, this revival was heavily panned by audiences due to the poorer production quality in comparison to the original. The show was continued in 2019 and 2020 on RTL II and now has a total of six episodes, with the latest episodes receiving slightly more favorable reviews.

In 2019, Frakes reprised his role for a sketch on the Fox NFL pregame show.

In October 2021, German private channel RTL II began broadcasting a revival of Beyond Belief: Fact or Fiction, with Jonathan Frakes reprising his role as the host. The first new episode was broadcast in German-speaking countries on October 31, 2021. Unlike previous seasons, the segments were produced and set in Germany, while the introductions by Jonathan Frakes were recorded in Los Angeles. Another set of two episodes aired in Germany on October 30, 2022. The new episodes were filmed in and around Los Angeles and are dubbed for German television. The production was executed by German studios Superama Film and Wiedemann & Berg Television and will feature 10 new stories.

== Episodes ==
Of the 239 stories told over the course of the 48 episodes, 139 were declared to be "fact." Each episode of the series' run had at least one "fiction" story and at least two "fact" stories.

=== Series overview ===
Season	Episodes	Originally released		TV Season	Time	Rank
Season	Episodes	First released	Last released	TV Season	Time	Rank
1	6	May 25, 1997	August 3, 1997	1997–98	Sunday at 7:00 PM	TBA
2	13	January 23, 1998	July 24, 1998	1998–99	Friday at 8:00 PM	117
3	13	February 17, 1999 (Germany); January 21, 2000 (USA)	May 13, 1999 (Germany); August 18, 2000 (USA)	1999–2000	Friday at 8:00 PM	TBA
4	13	April 8, 2002 (Germany); June 27, 2002 (USA)	July 15, 2002 (Germany); September 5, 2002 (USA)	2001–02	Thursday at 8:00 PM (1,3, 5-13); Thursday at 9:00 PM (2,4)	TBA
5	5	October 31, 2021 (Germany)	March 5, 2023	2021–2023	Halloween at 8:15 PM / Sunday 8:15 PM (2023)	TBA
6	7	October 29, 2023 (Germany)	TBA	2023–	Sunday 8:15 PM	TBA

=== Season 1 (1997) ===
No. overall	No. in season	Story titles	Host	Narrator	Original release date	Prod. Code	U.S. viewers (millions)
1	1	"The Apparition, The Electric Chair, On the Road, Number One With a Bullet & Dream House"	James Brolin	Don LaFontaine	May 25, 1997	BEY-101	6.45
2	2	"The Viewing, The Subway, Kid in the Closet, Justice is Served & The Tractor"	James Brolin	Don LaFontaine	June 1, 1997	BEY-102	7.43
3	3	"The Prophecy, Couch Potato, Love Over the Counter, Imaginary Friend & Last Man on Earth"	James Brolin	Don LaFontaine	June 8, 1997	BEY-105	6.79
4	4	"E-Mail, Cup of Joe, Secret of the Family Tomb, Wheezer & The Unknown Patient"	James Brolin	Don LaFontaine	June 15, 1997	BEY-104	6.13
5	5	"Needle Point, Toy to the Rescue, Mystery Lock, The House on Baker Street & The Train"	James Brolin	Don LaFontaine	June 22, 1997	BEY-103	7.07
6	6	"The Candlestick, The Diner, From the Agency, The Magic Rose Garden & The Jeep"	James Brolin	Don LaFontaine	August 3, 1997	BEY-106	5.48

=== Season 2 (1998) ===
No. overall	No. in season	Story titles	Host	Narrator	Original release date	Prod. Code	U.S. viewers (millions)
7	1	"The Plane, The Gun, The Portrait, The Pass & The Caller"	Jonathan Frakes	Don LaFontaine	January 23, 1998	BEY-201	9.19
8	2	"Firestation 32, The Computer, The Girl Next Door, The Wallet & The Woods"	Jonathan Frakes	Don LaFontaine	January 30, 1998	BEY-202	8.83
9	3	"The Wall, The Chalkboard, The Getaway, The Prescription & Summer Camp"	Jonathan Frakes	Don LaFontaine	February 6, 1998	BEY-203	8.07
10	4	"The Wrestler, The Escape, Dead Friday, Ghost Visitor & The Lady in a Black Dress (Friday the 13th special)"	Jonathan Frakes	Don LaFontaine	February 13, 1998	BEY-204	8.27
11	5	"The Land, Titan, The Diary, Town of Remembrance & The House on Barry Avenue"	Jonathan Frakes	Don LaFontaine	February 27, 1998	BEY-205	8.31
12	6	"Bright Lights, Magic Mightyman, The Student, Scribbles & Count Mystery"	Jonathan Frakes	Don LaFontaine	March 6, 1998	BEY-206	8.26
13	7	"The Mummy, The Perfect Record, Grave Sitting, Murder on the Second Floor & They Towed My Car"	Jonathan Frakes	Don LaFontaine	March 20, 1998	BEY-207	8.23
14	8	"Kirby, Dust, Malibu Cop, A Joyful Noise & The Hooded Chair"	Jonathan Frakes	Don LaFontaine	April 3, 1998	BEY-208	7.82
15	9	"Rock & Roll Ears, The Bucket, The Bridesmaid, Voice from the Grave & The Chess Game"	Jonathan Frakes	Don LaFontaine	April 17, 1998	BEY-209	7.66
16	10	"The Motorcycle, Blind Man's Dog, Deer Hunters, Tribal Curse & The Card Game (Animal Stories special)"	Jonathan Frakes	Don LaFontaine	April 24, 1998	BEY-210	7.12
17	11	"Bon Voyage, The Man in the Model T, The Scoop, Angel on Board & Buenos Dias (Disaster Stories special)"	Jonathan Frakes	Don LaFontaine	May 1, 1998	BEY-211	8.11
Bon Voyage: A couple relate the bizarre tale of how they skirted disaster.; Man in the Model T: A swap meet is visited by a mysterious man with a gift for a mother and her daughter.; The Scoop: In 1883, a reporter's dream inspires a story of disaster.; Angel on Board: A woman on a plane seems to get warnings of danger from the crew.; Buenos Dias: A young girl trapped in a collapsed house is comforted by the voice of her Grandfather.; Note: This episode was originally advertised as the season finale, despite that two additional episodes would air during the summer season.
18	12	"Merry-Go-Round, Red Eyed Creature, Used Car Salesman, Surveillance Camera & Graffiti (A Touch of Evil special)"	Jonathan Frakes	Don LaFontaine	July 17, 1998	BEY-212	5.96
19	13	"The Warning, Bus Stop, The Cure, The Guardian & The Gift"	Jonathan Frakes	Don LaFontaine	July 24, 1998	BEY-213	6.15

=== Season 3 (2000) ===
This season premiered in Germany nearly a year before it aired on FOX; albeit, out of order.

No. overall	No. in season	Story titles	Host	Narrator	Original release date	Prod. Code	U.S. viewers (millions)
20	1	"Morning Sickness, The Curse of Hampton Manor, Wax Executioner, Blood Bank & Ring Toss"	Jonathan Frakes	Don LaFontaine	February 17, 1999 (Germany); January 21, 2000 (USA)	BEY-305	7.60
21	2	"One for the Road, The Music Box, Two to One, Damsel & The Horn"	Jonathan Frakes	Don LaFontaine	April 4, 1999 (Germany); May 26, 2000 (USA)	TBA	4.47
22	3	"The Find, The Golden Cue, The FBI Story, The Gravedigger's Nemesis & Last Rites"	Jonathan Frakes	Don LaFontaine	April 14, 1999 (Germany); June 2, 2000 (USA)	BEY-309	6.24
23	4	"E-Mail, Blood Donor, Epitaph, Stitches in Time & Soldier"	Jonathan Frakes	Don LaFontaine	May 5, 1999 (Germany); June 16, 2000 (USA)	TBA	4.80
24	5	"The Nightmare, The Stalker, The Impossible Car Dream, The Dresser & The Burial (Dream special)"	Jonathan Frakes	Don LaFontaine	March 17, 1999 (Germany); June 23, 2000 (USA)	BEY-312	5.23
25	6	"Red Line, Two Sisters, Eclipse, The Ice Box & The Gathering"	Jonathan Frakes	Don LaFontaine	March 3, 1999 (Germany); June 30, 2000 (USA)	BEY-304	6.16
26	7	"Connie, Positive I.D., Trucker, Cook Out & The New House"	Jonathan Frakes	Don LaFontaine	May 13, 1999 (Germany); July 7, 2000 (USA)	BEY-303	5.57
27	8	"Creepy Comics, Louie the Dip, The Wailing, The Landlady & Curse"	Jonathan Frakes	Don LaFontaine	March 24, 1999 (Germany); July 14, 2000 (USA)	BEY-306	6.07
28	9	"For the Record, Halloween, Precious, Get Your Kicks at Motel 66 & Phantom Drifter"	Jonathan Frakes	Don LaFontaine	April 28, 1999 (Germany); July 21, 2000 (USA)	BEY-311	6.13
29	10	"Devil's Tattoo, Static Man, The Bloody Hand, Where Have All the Heroes Gone & War Surplus"	Jonathan Frakes	Don LaFontaine	April 21, 1999 (Germany); July 28, 2000 (USA)	BEY-301	7.00
30	11	"Dead Beat Daddy (alias Deadbeat Dad), Ghost Town, The Sewing Machine, The Sleepwalker & Money Laundry"	Jonathan Frakes	Don LaFontaine	February 24, 1999 (Germany); August 4, 2000 (USA)	BEY-302	6.22
31	12	"The Handyman, Anatole, Makeup Magic, Screwdriver & Charlie"	Jonathan Frakes	Don LaFontaine	March 10, 1999 (Germany); August 11, 2000 (USA)	BEY-310	6.81
32	13	"The Dealer, Gratuity, The Cake, 1st Time Offender & The Mirror of Truth"	Jonathan Frakes	Don LaFontaine	March 31, 1999 (Germany); August 18, 2000 (USA)	BEY-307	7.05

=== Season 4 (2002) ===
This season premiered in Germany over two months before it aired on FOX. The episodes were filmed in and around Vancouver, British Columbia, unlike with previous seasons, which were filmed in California.

No. overall	No. in season	Story titles	Host	Narrator	Original release date	U.S. viewers (millions)
33	1	"The Devil's Autograph, Mail Order Degree, The News Stand, The Murder of Roy Hennessey & Mysterious Strangers"	Jonathan Frakes	Campbell Lane	April 8, 2002 (Germany); June 27, 2002 (USA)	5.85
34	2	"Writer's Agent, Crypt Ghost, The Doll, Hubert's Curse & Shared Vision"	Jonathan Frakes	Campbell Lane	April 15, 2002 (Germany); June 27, 2002 (USA)	5.79
35	3	"Out of Service, When I Was Big, The Greedy Investor, Seven Hours of Bad Luck & The Secret of the Coins"	Jonathan Frakes	Campbell Lane	April 22, 2002 (Germany); July 4, 2002 (USA)	4.04
36	4	"Second Sight, The Fine Line, The Wrong Turn, Who Was I & You Are Next (Sixth Sense special)"	Jonathan Frakes	Campbell Lane	April 29, 2002 (Germany); July 4, 2002 (USA)	4.21
37	5	"House of Shadows, One Hand in the Till, Teasdale's Motor Car, The Vision & The Grave"	Jonathan Frakes	Campbell Lane	May 6, 2002 (Germany); July 11, 2002 (USA)	5.35
38	6	"The Dorm, The Child Artist, The Weatherman, Sit-Down Comedian & Room 245"	Jonathan Frakes	Campbell Lane	May 13, 2002 (Germany); July 18, 2002 (USA)	6.05
39	7	"The Wreath, Terror Night, Tants, The Candidate & The Ring"	Jonathan Frakes	Campbell Lane	May 27, 2002 (Germany); July 25, 2002 (USA)	4.90
40	8	"Caitlin's Candle, The Flower Jury, The Mentor, The Old Bike & The Music Teacher"	Jonathan Frakes	Campbell Lane	June 10, 2002 (Germany); August 1, 2002 (USA)	5.60
41	9	"The Wealthy Widow, The Witness, The Accident, Bad Dreams & Mental"	Jonathan Frakes	Campbell Lane	June 17, 2002 (Germany); August 8, 2002 (USA)	5.58
42	10	"Moonstruck Beach, Healing Hands, Aspen Sunny Side, Night Walker & Hot Car"	Jonathan Frakes	Campbell Lane	June 24, 2002 (Germany); August 15, 2002 (USA)	5.65
43	11	"The Mystery of Douglas Hibbard, Wheelchair Man, The Vigil, The Mandarin's Bowl & Ghost Writer"	Jonathan Frakes	Campbell Lane	July 1, 2002 (Germany); August 22, 2002 (USA)	5.72
44	12	"Witness to Murder, Roulette Wheel, The Phrenologist's Head, The Bridge & The Cigar Box"	Jonathan Frakes	Campbell Lane	July 8, 2002 (Germany); August 29, 2002 (USA)	4.75
45	13	"The Hand, The Battered Doll, Poker Justice, Above the Clouds & Screen Saver"	Jonathan Frakes	Campbell Lane	July 15, 2002 (Germany); September 5, 2002 (USA)	5.13

=== Season 5 (2021–23) ===
This season was produced exclusively for the German television market by German channel RTL II. The first episode premiered in Germany on Halloween 2021, with further episodes being released each following Halloween. Unlike previous seasons, the segments of the first episode were produced and set in Germany, while the introductions by Jonathan Frakes were recorded in Los Angeles. Multiple German media personalities such as Gronkh made guest appearances. Eight more episodes of season 5 were filmed in and around Los Angeles in 2022, with the first two episodes airing on October 30, 2022, in Germany. As of 2022, the English versions of these episodes have not been released in any market.

No. overall	No. in season	Story titles	Host	Narrator	Original release date	U.S. viewers (millions)
46	1	"Glückszahlen (Lucky Numbers), Alles hat seinen Platz (Everything has its Place), Kerze im Wald (Candle in the Woods) & Erwachen der Gabe (Awakening of the Gift)"	Jonathan Frakes	Eberhard Prüfer	October 31, 2021 (Germany)	N/A
47	2	"Das dritte Date (The Third Date), Kopfloser Reiter (Headless Horseman), Mr. Chang's Shop (Towers), Lucky Loser (Lucky Loser) & Knutschfleck (Hickey)"	Jonathan Frakes	Eberhard Prüfer	October 30, 2022 (Germany)	N/A
48	3	"Die Nonne (The Nun), Teuflische Verbindung (Satanic Connection), Gettysburg (Gettysburg), Verloren im Wald (Lost in the Woods) & Der Autor (The Author)"	Jonathan Frakes	Eberhard Prüfer	October 30, 2022 (Germany)	N/A
49	4	"Okkultes Erbe (Occult Inheritance), Das legendäre Studio (The Legendary Studio), Die Hand der Gerechtigkeit (Hand of Justice), Seltsame Lichter (Strange Lights) & 'Der Veteran (A Veteran's Tale)"	Jonathan Frakes	Eberhard Prüfer	March 5, 2023 (Germany)	N/A
50	5	"Vergessene Orte (Lost Places), Der verbotene Schatz (A Forbidden Treasure), Das Vermächtnis (Legacy), Eine kalte Spur (A Cold Case) & Geheimnisvolle Botschaften (Mysterious Messages)"	Jonathan Frakes	Eberhard Prüfer	March 5, 2023 (Germany)	N/A

=== Season 6 (2023–25) ===
No. overall	No. in season	Story titles	Host	Narrator	Original release date	U.S. viewers (millions)
51	1	"Der Kontrolleur (The Ticket Inspector), Das Hotel des Grauens (The Hotel of Horror), Die blutige Spur (The Bloody Trail), Ehre unter Dieben (Honor Among Thieves) & Und wieder rote Augen (Red Eyes Again)"	Jonathan Frakes	Eberhard Prüfer	October 29, 2023 (Germany)	N/A
52	2	"Betsys Hotel (Betsy's Hotel), Am Anderen Ende (Over and Out), Vor dem Flug (Pre-Flight Check), Keine Sympathie Für den Teufel (No Sympathy for the Devil) & Der Dichter (The Poet)"	Jonathan Frakes	Eberhard Prüfer	November 1, 2024 (Germany)	N/A
53	3	"Der Unbenkannte (The Stranger), Das böse Spiegelbild (The Evil Within), Die Zeitverschiebing (The Time Shift), Stalker (The Stalker) & Dreht um! (Turn Around!)"	Jonathan Frakes	Eberhard Prüfer	November 1, 2024 (Germany)	N/A
54	4	"Das Zeichentrickorakel (Florida Family Men), Spirit of the Hawk (Spirit of the Hawk), Nächtlicher Besucher (Nocturnal Visitor), Der elektrische Stuhl (Electric Justice) & Die Spielhölle (The Arcade)"	Jonathan Frakes	Eberhard Prüfer	November 3, 2024 (Germany)	N/A
55	5	"Rund um die Uhr geöffnet (Open 24 Hours a day), Der Beobachter (The Observer), Die Haushaltshilfen (The House Elves), Falsch verbunden (False Connection) & Das Mädchen im Nebel (The Girl in the Mist)"	Jonathan Frakes	Eberhard Prüfer	November 3, 2024 (Germany)	N/A
56	6	"Der graue Mann und das Meer (The Gray Man and the Sea), Der Schnappschuss (Snapshot), Lebenslänglich (Life Sentence), Rechtmäßiges Erbe (Rightful Owner) & Der Übungsflug (The Sighting)"	Jonathan Frakes	Eberhard Prüfer	November 1, 2025 (Germany)	N/A
57	7	"Gehängt (Hanged), Das Signal (The Signal), Aus den Feenreich (Changeling), Housesitting (Housesitting) & Die Gitarre (The Guitar)"	Jonathan Frakes	Eberhard Prüfer	November 1, 2025 (Germany)	N/A

== Syndication/Home media ==
During its final run of Fox, the series was picked up for reruns by the Sci-fi Channel, which ran from July 8, 2002 to September 6, 2005. It would later air on the now defunct Chiller channel from 2009 to 2016.

Beyond Belief: Fact or Fiction Season One was released on DVD in Region 1 on August 28, 2007. In 2018, FilmRise obtained the rights to the series, and made it available for video streaming via Amazon Prime and other services, including their YouTube channel.

== See also ==
- Urban Legends
- Penn & Teller Tell a Lie
