= Robert Tralins =

American science-fiction author (1926–2010)

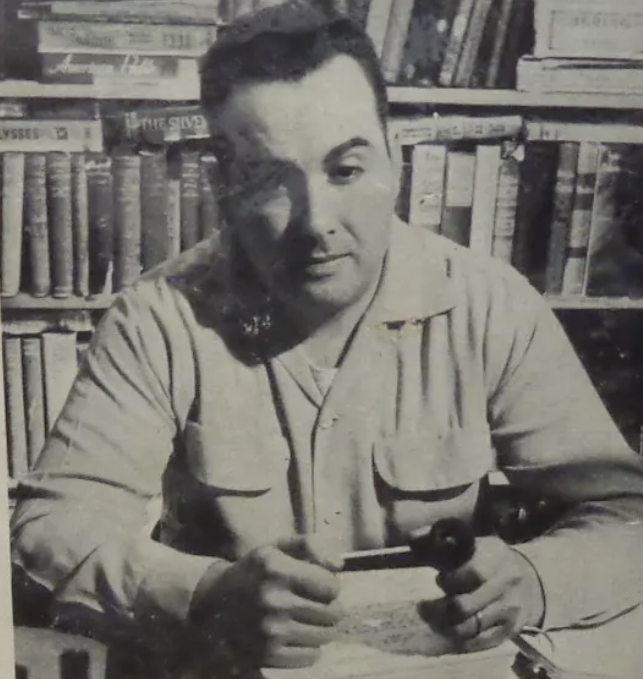
- Born: 28 April 1926; Baltimore, Maryland, United States
- Died: 20 May 2010 (aged 84)
- Occupation: Novelist
- Years active: 1960s–2010

Sandor Robert Tralins (April 28, 1926 – May 20, 2010) was an American author of science fiction and pulp magazine fiction. He reportedly authored more than 250 books, including pornography, and used numerous pseudonyms.

== Life ==
Tralins attended Eastern College in Baltimore (later merged with the University of Baltimore). He was a Marine Corps reservist during the mid-1940s.

In 1966, Tralins sued the Federal Communications Commission, National Collegiate Athletic Association, and American Broadcasting Company, claiming that residents of the northern United States were being shown games of better-quality football teams than those in the south.

== Career ==
Tralins' work The Sexual Fetish describes agalmatophilia ("statue-love") and frottage. Kelso notes that Black Stud (1962), along with similar texts of the period that she traces to Mandingo (1957), "can perniciously reinforce hostile constructions of blacks", as they depict black people in a dehumanizing and hypersexualized manner. In 1963, Tralins' work Pleasure Was My Business—a ghost-written account of the life and times of Rose Miller ("Madame Sherry"), a madam in Miami—- was declared obscene by a Florida court. The finding was later reversed by the Supreme Court, in a per curiam opinion.

In 1964, Tralins and a neuropsychiatrist, Dr. Michael M. Gilbert, taught ten-lesson memory courses.

In 1966, he wrote Strange Events Beyond Human Understanding, a collection of stories of the paranormal. Some of his stories were adapted for television in 1992 in CBS' Miracles And Other Wonders. In 1997, Tralins' tales were adapted for the TV show Beyond Belief: Fact or Fiction.

Tralins wrote a tie-in novel, Dragnet 1967, based on the TV series. For unknown reasons, the novel was pulled from circulation at the behest of Jack Webb and is now extremely rare.
