= Charles J. Stolbrand =

United States Army general (1821–1894)

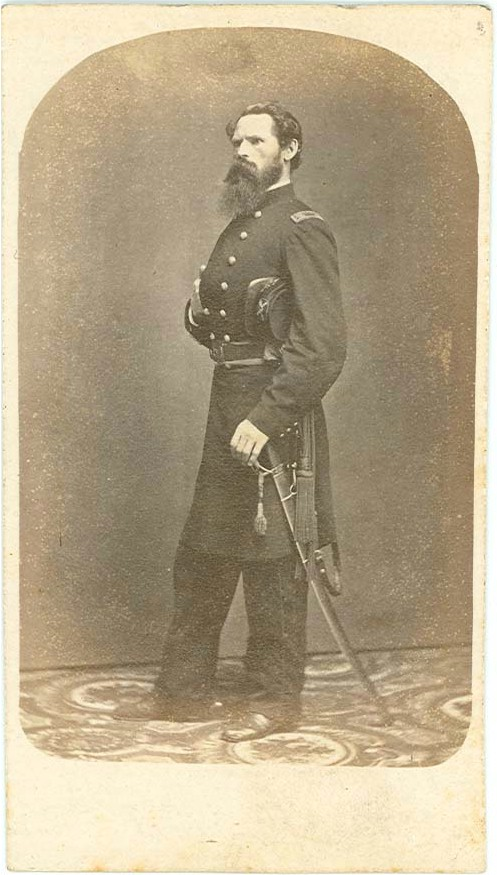
- Charles J. Stolbrand as major of artillery
- Born: Carl Johan Möller; May 13, 1821; Össjö parish, Skåne, Sweden
- Died: February 3, 1894 (aged 72); Charleston, South Carolina, US
- Burial place: Arlington National Cemetery
- Other names: Carl Johan Ståhlbrand, Carlos J. Stolbrand, Carlos John Mueller Stolbrand (Stohlbrand)
- Military career
- Allegiance: Sweden; United States
- Branch: Royal Swedish Artillery; Union Army, Artillery
- Service years: 1839–1850; 1861–1866
- Rank: Sergeant, Sweden; Brigadier General, USV
- Units: Royal Wendish Artillery Regiment; 2nd Illinois Light Artillery Regiment
- Commands: Chief of Artillery, Division, Corps; Brigade commander
- Conflicts: American Civil War: Battle of Fort Henry; Battle of Fort Donelson; Battle of Shiloh; Siege of Corinth; Second Battle of Corinth; Vicksburg Campaign; Chattanooga campaign; Atlanta campaign; March to the Sea; Carolinas campaign
- Awards: Knight of the Royal Order of the Sword

Charles J. Stolbrand (May 13, 1821 – February 3, 1894), was a sergeant in the Swedish artillery who emigrated to the United States, becoming a brigadier general in the Union Army during the Civil War, and a politician in South Carolina after the war.

== Early life ==
Stolbrand was born as one of nine illegitimate children of Adolf Fredrik Tornérhielm, a nobleman and manor owner, with his mistress Christina Möller, a chambermaid at the manor. At the age of 18, in 1839, Stolbrand enlisted in the Royal Wendish Artillery, at the same time changing his family name from Möller to Ståhlbrand. In 1850 he resigned from the Swedish army, and emigrated to the United States with his wife and a three-year-old son. Stolbrand first settled in New York City in 1852 and then eventually made his way to Chicago with his family, earning his livelihood as a land surveyor, and clerk in the Cook County Recorder's Office. He participated actively in the city's political and social life, being one of the founders of the Svea Society, a middle class Swedish-American secular association, serving as its president for several years.

== Civil War ==
At the beginning of the Civil War, Stolbrand raised a volunteer artillery company, but it was not accepted into service, as Illinois' quota already had been filled. However, when a new call for troops came, he raised another artillery company that, later in 1861, became Battery G, 2nd Illinois Light Artillery, with himself as captain. After about a month's service, Stolbrand was promoted to major. He served in the Army of the Tennessee, as Chief of Artillery, Third Division, XVII Corps, and as Chief of Artillery, XVII Corps, in both instances under John A. Logan as commander of the division and the corps. Stolbrand became a prisoner of war in September 1864, incarcerated in Columbia, South Carolina, but exchanged within a month In 1865, he was promoted to brigadier general, becoming commander of Second Brigade, Fourth Division, XVII Army Corps. Colonel Hans Mattson tells us in his memoirs, that it was General Sherman himself who arranged with President Lincoln to have Stolbrand promoted, since he otherwise would have resigned.

== South Carolina ==
After the war, Stolbrand settled in Beaufort, South Carolina where he had a plantation. He became active in Republican politics; was secretary of the state constitutional convention of 1868, a delegate to the Republican National Convention, and a presidential elector the same year. Stolbrand was elected to the South Carolina House of Representatives in 1868, but resigned in 1869, when he was appointed superintendent of the state penitentiary, an office he held until 1873. He was later accused by the anti-Reconstruction elements in the legislature, of embezzlement while in office. In 1876 he became superintendent of construction of the customs house in Charleston, an office he held until the building was finished the following year. In 1880 Stolbrand was appointed federal storekeeper and gauger, and also ran and lost against D. Wyatt Aiken in the congressional elections of that year. During President Harrison's administration he was superintendent of federal buildings in Charleston.

== Personal life ==
Stolbrand married Maria Sophia Petersson, the daughter of a sergeant-major in the same regiment as his. The couple had three children in Sweden, but two died before their departure for America. In their adopted country, they had another four children; three daughters and a son. The son eventually served six years as a lieutenant in the U.S. Army. In 1894, Stolbrand contracted influenza which resulted in a collapsed lung; he died as a result. He was buried at Arlington National Cemetery, in Arlington, Virginia, under the name of Carlos J. Stolbrand.
