= Pawleys Island Historic District =

Historic district in South Carolina, United States

- U.S. National Register of Historic Places
- U.S. Historic district
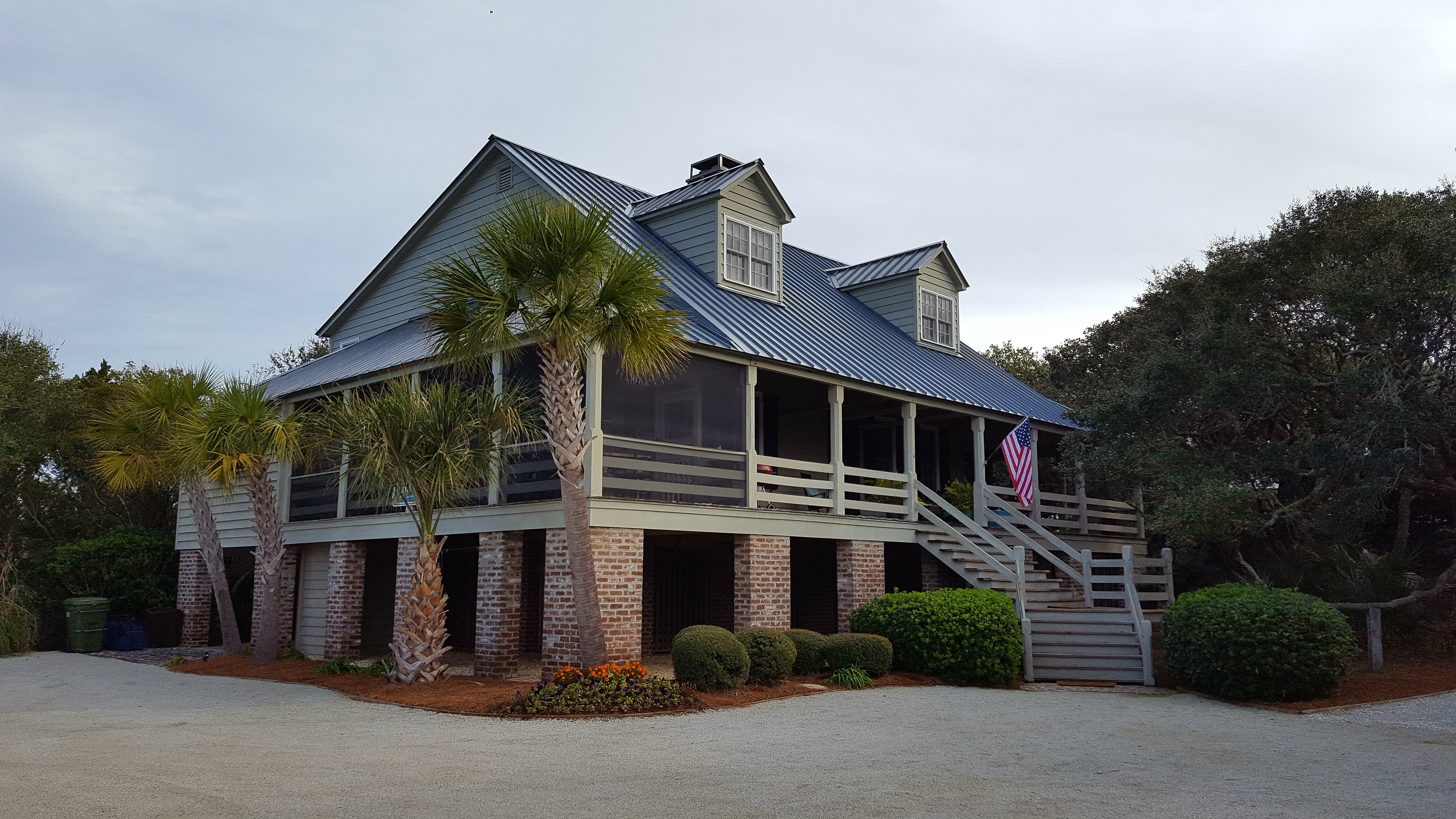
- Joseph Blyth Allston House

- Location within South Carolina Location within the United States
- Location: W side of Pawleys Island, Pawleys Island, South Carolina
- Coordinates: 33°25′26″N 79°7′50″W
- Area: 50 acres (20 ha)
- NRHP reference No.: 72001211
- Added to NRHP: November 15, 1972

Pawleys Island Historic District is a national historic district located at Pawleys Island, Georgetown County, South Carolina. The district encompasses 12 contributing buildings and contains buildings ranging from ca. 1780 to post World War I, and includes shoreline which the owners of these homes think they own, and marshland. The building style is a variation of West Indian architecture which has been adapted to Pawleys climatic conditions. The original houses on Pawleys are not mansions but summer retreats, sturdily built and large enough to accommodate big families. Designed for the greatest degree of ventilation, with porches on multiple sides and with high brick foundations providing protection against gale tides, many of the 20th-century buildings have adhered to the traditional design that has proven well suited to this environment. The houses are equipped with large chimneys and fireplaces. Breezeways attached at the rear of the houses led to the kitchens. Servant's quarters were usually one or two room cabins equipped with fireplaces.

It was listed on the National Register of Historic Places in 1972.
