= St. John African Methodist Episcopal Church (Pawleys Island, South Carolina) =

St. John A.M.E. Church
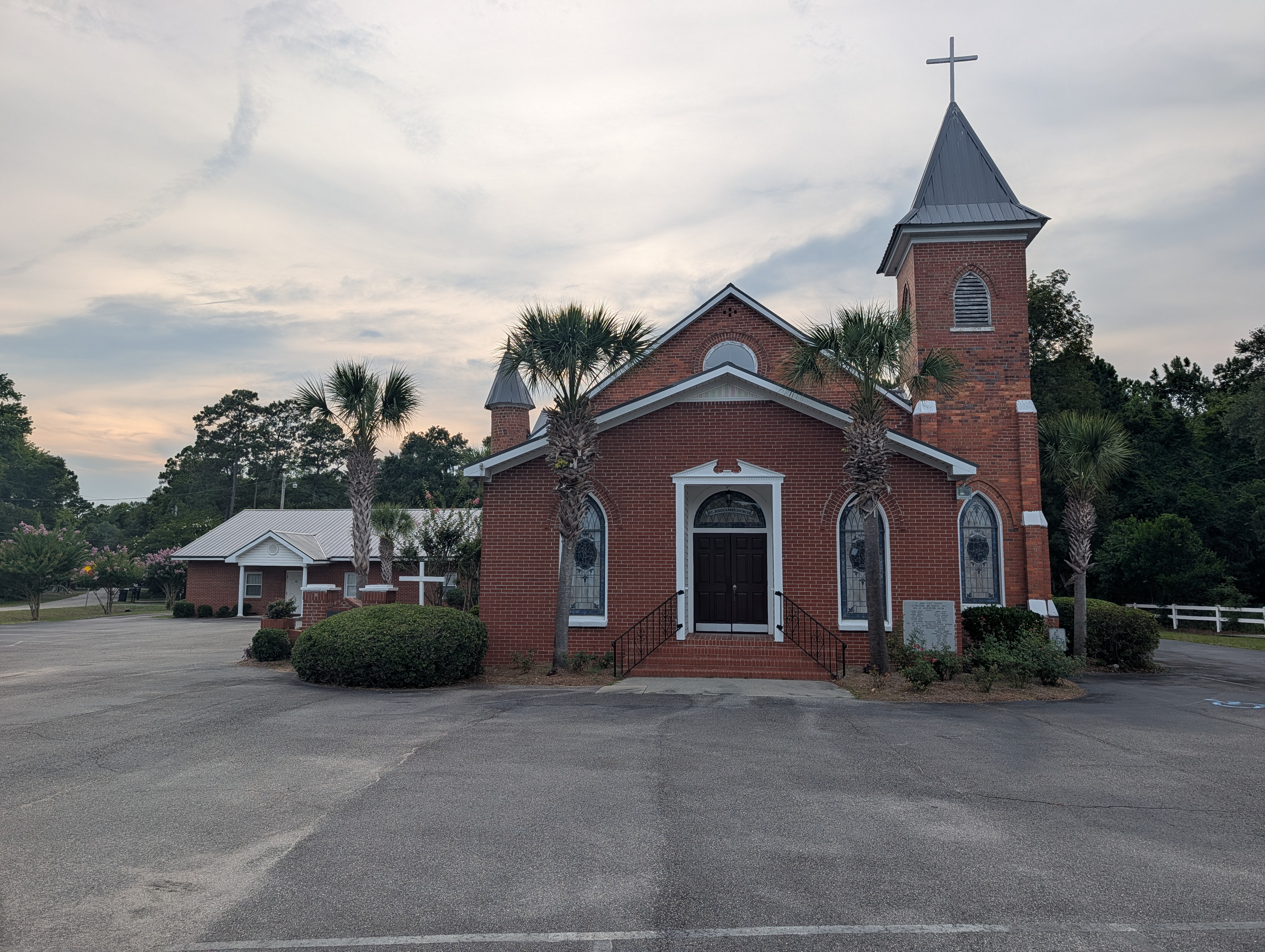

- Location within South Carolina
- 33°27.187′N 79°7.428′W
- Location: 76 Duncan Avenue, Pawleys Island, South Carolina 29585
- Country: United States
- Denomination: African Methodist Episcopal Church

History
- Status: Active
- Founded: Spring 1867
- Founder: Rev. Saby Green (first pastor)

Architecture
- Completed: 1947 (present sanctuary)

Specifications
- Materials: Brick

St. John African Methodist Episcopal Church (also St. John AME Church) is an African Methodist Episcopal congregation at 76 Duncan Avenue, Pawleys Island, in Georgetown County, South Carolina, United States. Founded in the spring of 1867 by formerly enslaved people, the church is marked by a South Carolina historical marker (No. 22-65) erected in 2017.

== History ==
=== Founding ===
St. John A.M.E. Church was organized in the spring of 1867, in the early years of Reconstruction, by a congregation of formerly enslaved African Americans on South Carolina's Waccamaw Neck. Rev. Saby Green (also rendered "S. Green" or "Sabey Green" in church and denominational records) served as the congregation's first pastor. According to Georgetown District Presiding Elder Rev. Dr. Sandy L. Drayton, speaking at the church's 150th-anniversary observance, the founders were "fresh out of slavery" when they resolved to build the church. The church was formally accepted by the South Carolina Annual Conference of the AME Church on April 7, 1867.

Official minutes of the South Carolina Annual Conference of the AME Church, published in an 1890 quarto-centennial commemorative volume, independently record Green's ordination as a local deacon at the conference's third session, held in Wilmington, North Carolina, beginning March 30, 1867, under Presiding Elder A. T. Carr of the Georgetown District. The same records show Green was formally appointed to pastor the Waccamaw Circuit in 1869 and again in 1871.

The congregation initially met under a brush arbor before constructing a log-framed church at Litchfield in 1867. This first church building was known as Campbell Chapel, named for its founder, Brutus Campbell. The church was originally part of the Waccamaw Circuit—sharing clergy with St. Mary and Gordon Chapel—before becoming an independent station church, with Rev. W. J. McKnight as its first minister to preach every Sunday, in 1965.

=== Second church building ===
At some point after its founding, the congregation moved from the original Litchfield log church into a second building, referred to in church records simply as the "second church." A surviving photograph shows Rev. G. E. Washington with a group of trustees standing outside this building. By December 1939, Rev. George Washington was serving as St. John's pastor; a "Pawleys Island News" column in the Palmetto Leader reported that he delivered a sermon that month and that the deacon of St. John, identified as "Bro. Waldo," preached the same week.

=== Present sanctuary (1947) ===
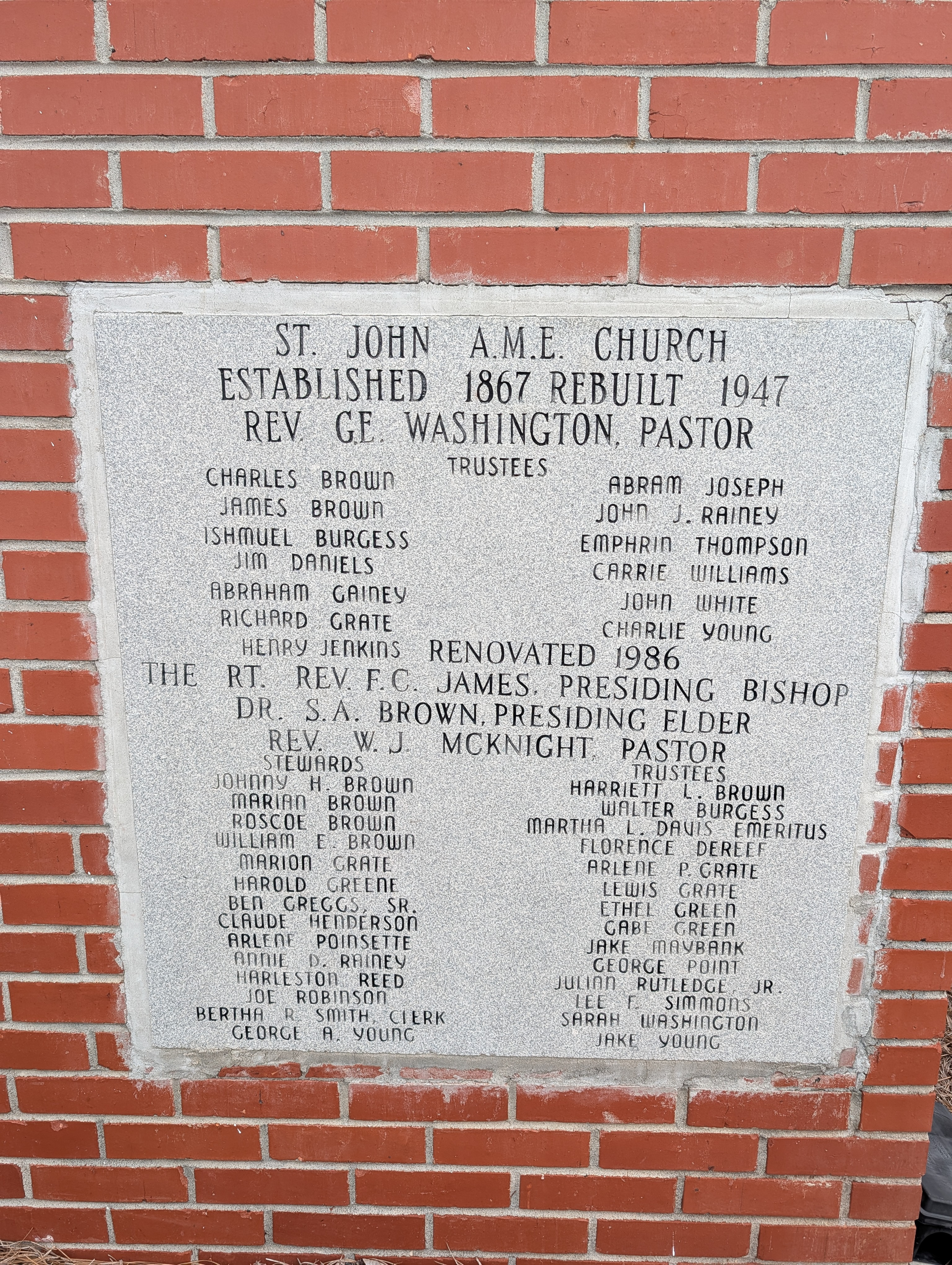
Cornerstone noting the church's 1867 founding, 1947 rebuilding, and 1986 renovation

Church entrance, with stained-glass transom

Under Rev. G. E. Washington, the congregation erected its present brick sanctuary at 76 Duncan Avenue, dedicated in 1947; the church bell was moved from the second church building to the new site. A cornerstone on the building reads "St. Johns A.M.E. Church, G. E. Washington, Pastor, Dedicated 1947." The building's 1947 construction date is independently confirmed in the South Carolina Department of Archives and History's 2006 Historic Resources Survey of Georgetown County, which catalogued the church as Resource No. 0722, classified as a religious property.

The church also maintains a cemetery, on land donated by a local landowner and acquired for the congregation by church members in the early 20th century. The cemetery contains grave markers predating the present sanctuary, including a U.S. government-issued military headstone for Jackson Glover, a private in the 156th Depot Brigade during World War I, who died January 17, 1937, and a marker for Rose Snipe (1865–1936).

Church cemetery

Overview of the cemetery grounds

Grave marker of Rose Snipe (1865–1936)

Military headstone of Jackson Glover, d. 1937

=== Later expansion and renovation (1960–2008) ===
The congregation's first documented expansion of its landholdings occurred in 1960, when the Georgetown County Board of Education conveyed a 0.5-acre tract adjoining the church property to five named trustees—Buster Washington, William Brown, Julius Blake, Edward Allston, and Tillman Thomas—"as Trustees of St. John A.M.E. Church of Georgetown County," for nominal consideration of one dollar. The tract, part of a larger 3.9-acre survey in the Parkersville Section of Township 7, was surveyed by Samuel M. Harper in October 1959; the deed was executed January 14, 1960, and recorded February 15, 1960.

1960 land conveyance records, Georgetown County Register of Deeds

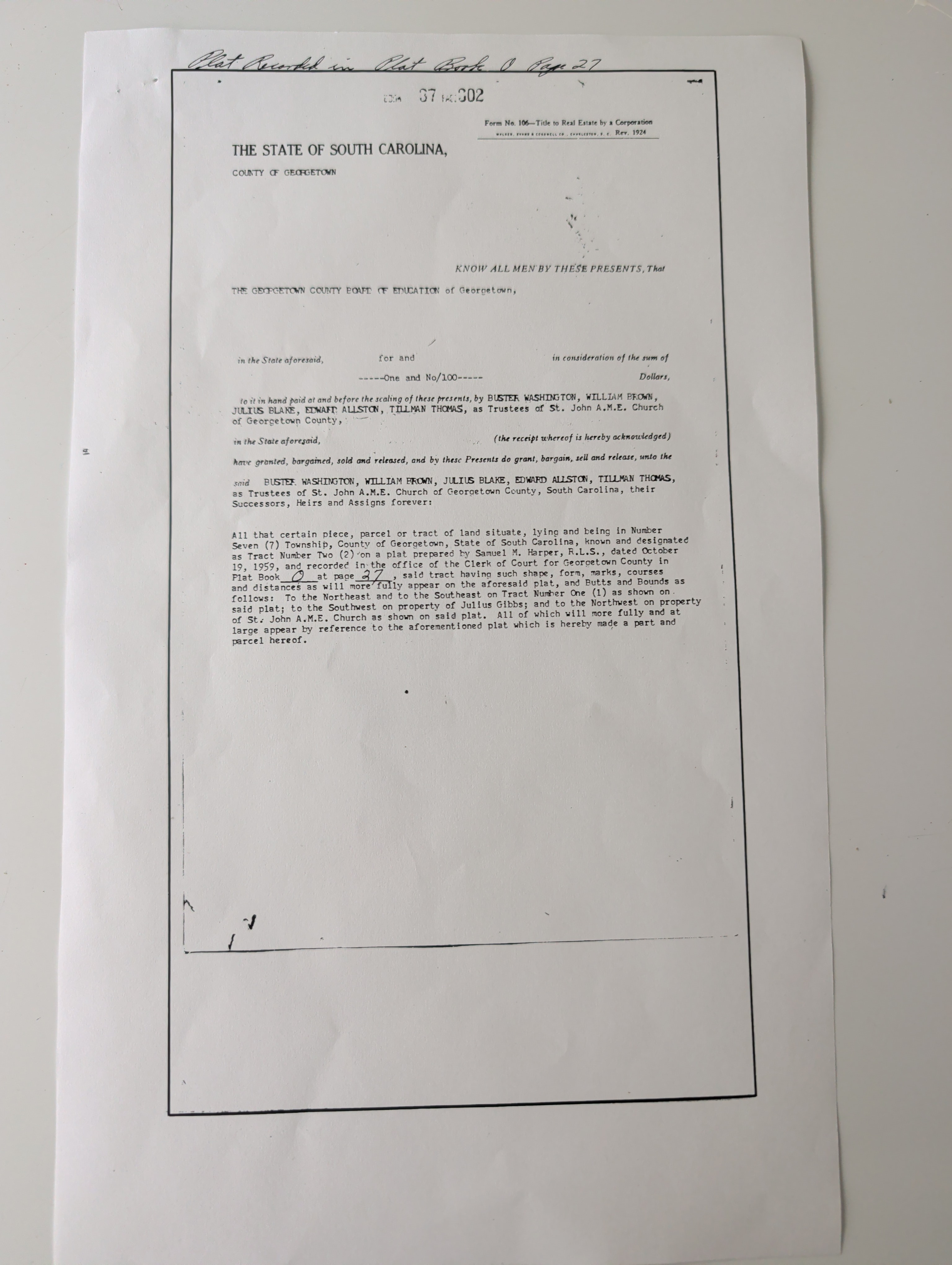
Deed, page 1: granting clause naming the church's trustees

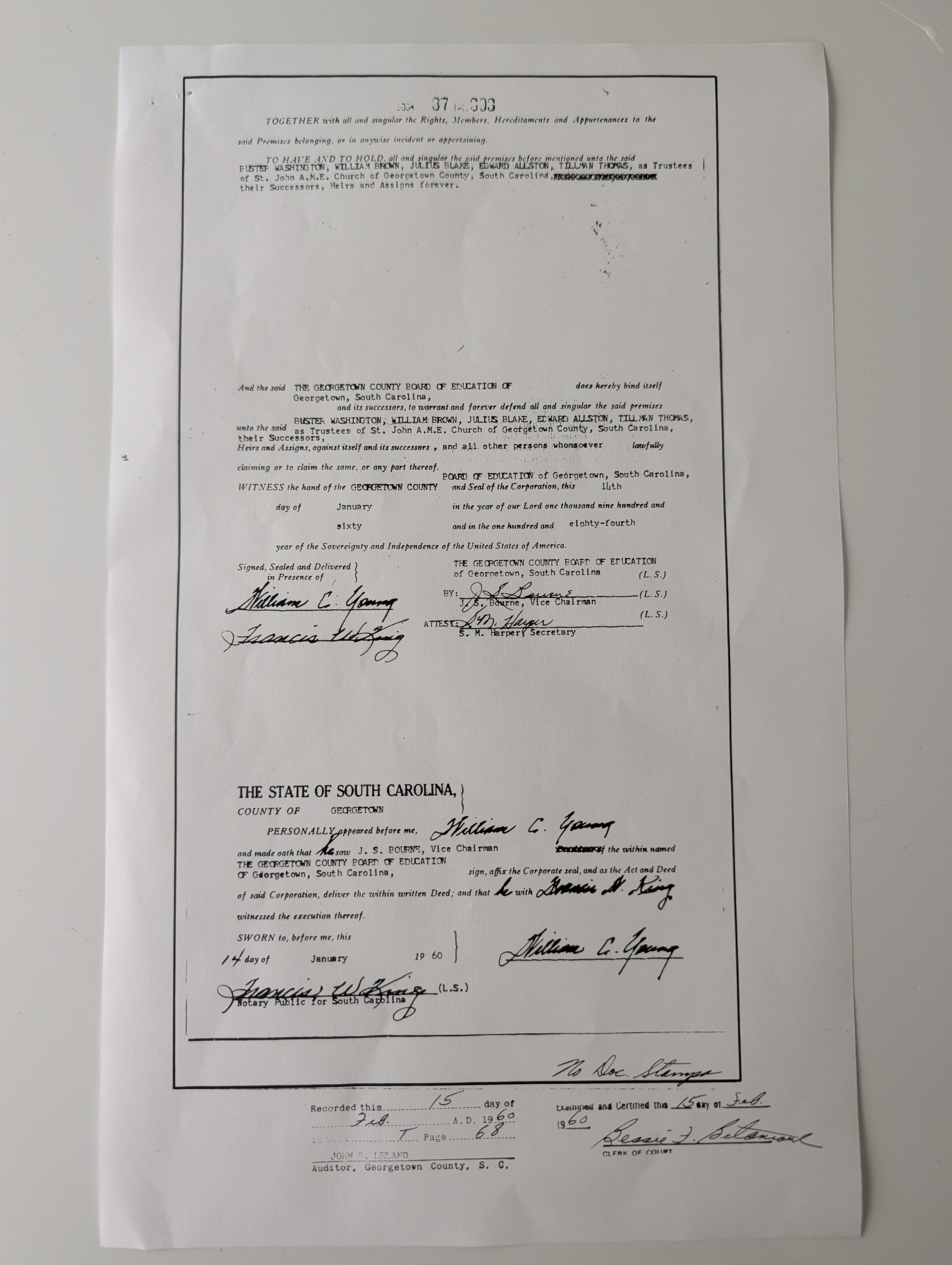
Deed, page 2: signatures and recording stamp

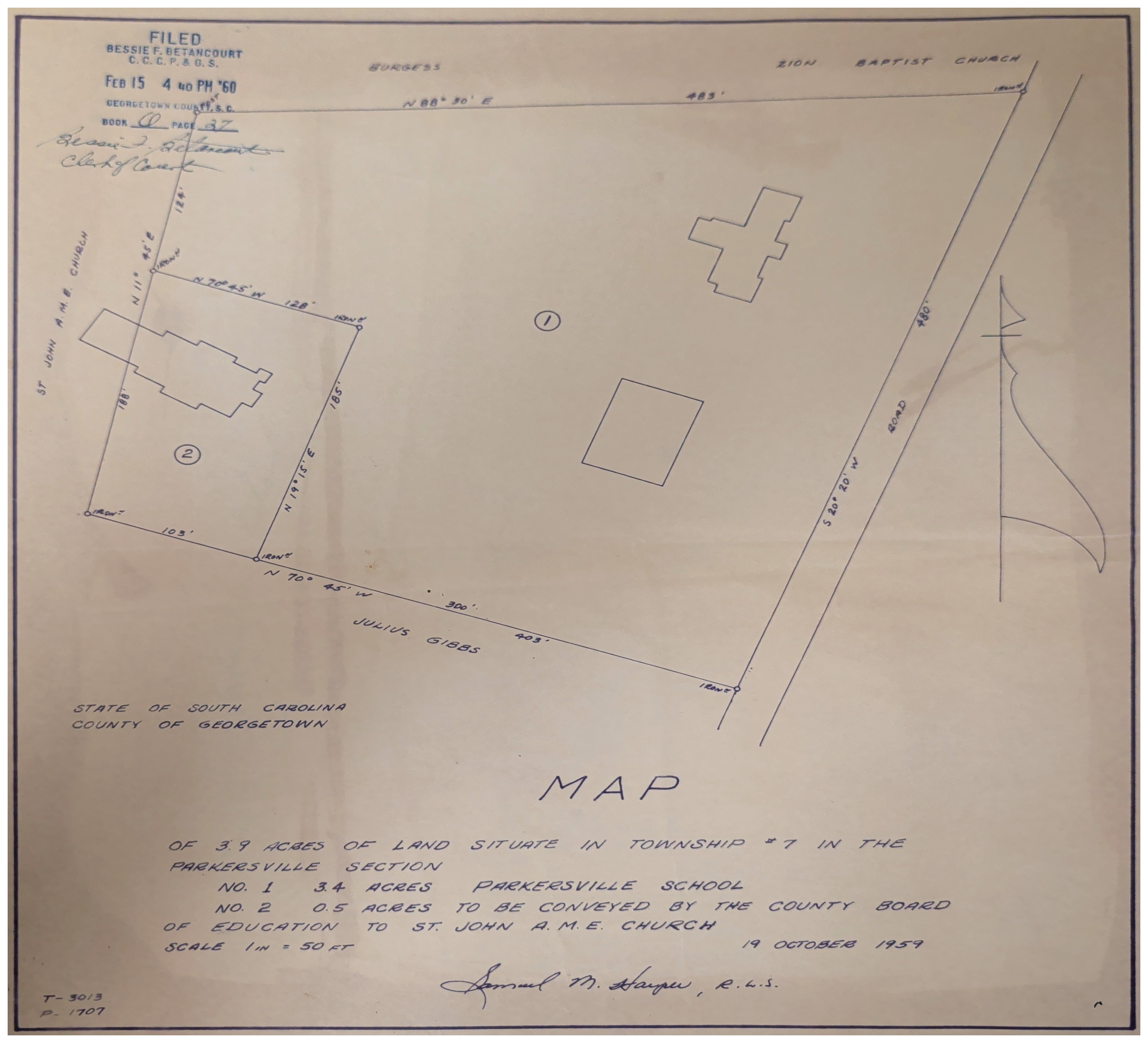
1959 survey plat showing the conveyed tract

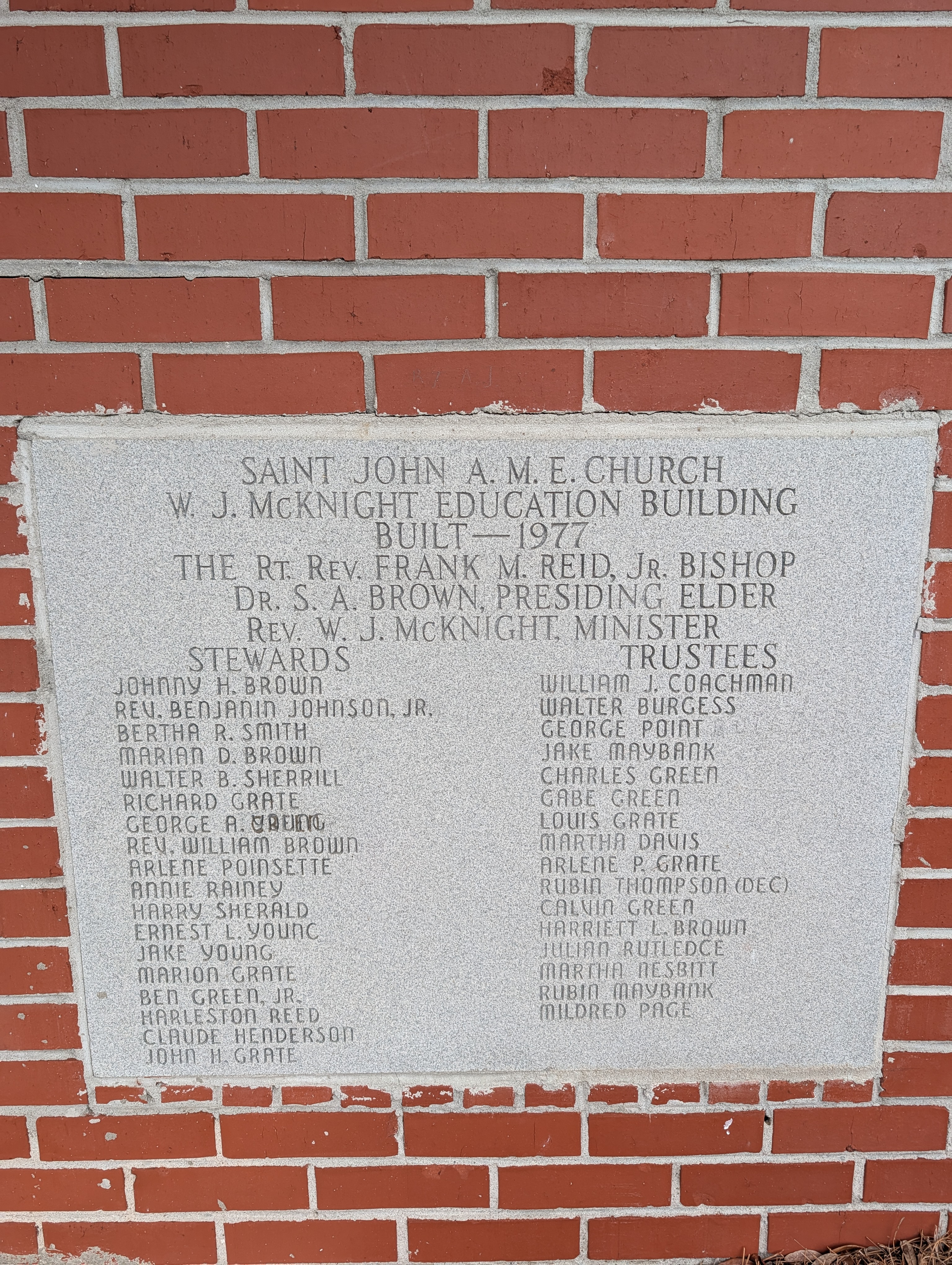
Cornerstone of the W. J. McKnight Education Building, built 1977

Rev. W. J. McKnight's tenure brought numerous improvements to the sanctuary, including new flooring, pews, pulpit furniture, and stained-glass windows. In 1977, the congregation built an adjoining education building, named the W. J. McKnight Education Building in his honor. McKnight, who also pastored St. Paul AME Church in Sampit and Mt. Lebanon AME Church in Andrews during his ministry, was the founding president of the Andrews NAACP chapter and, in 1972, became the first Black person elected to the Andrews Town Council, serving four years. The sanctuary was renovated again in 1986, still under Rev. McKnight's pastorate.

In April 1988, church trustees purchased an additional 0.16 acres (0.065 ha) of property in front of the church for $4,500—independently corroborated by a Georgetown County deed dated May 31, 1988 (Book 288, Page 138), transferring the same 0.16-acre tract from Georgetown County to the church. The congregation acquired further adjoining land in 1997 and 2003, and in 2005 a Master-in-Equity court deed consolidated the church's landholdings, previously held in the name of individual trustees, into the title of the church itself. Rev. O'Neil Miller, appointed in November 1988, oversaw repairs following damage from Hurricane Hugo in 1989. Rev. Richard Brown Jr., who arrived from the Kingstree District in November 1997, established a "Children's Church" ministry and oversaw the purchase of a church parsonage. Under Rev. Jesse Marshall, beginning in fall 2003, the church's Trustee Board borrowed $150,000 for extensive renovations to the church and education buildings. In September 2007, Rev. Alford L. Buckner was appointed as the congregation's 24th pastor.

=== Community and outreach ===
In March 2003, St. John hosted a program titled "Reflections of the Motherland," at which church members spoke about a recent mission trip to Cape Town, South Africa, sponsored by the AME Church's 15th Episcopal District. Proceeds from the program went toward establishing a soup kitchen in South Africa.

At the church's 148th anniversary observance in 2015, longtime member Arlene Grate summarized the congregation's physical evolution over its history: "We came from a log cabin church, wood-burning heating, from the outhouse to indoor restrooms, from sand parking, to cement parking." The same anniversary coverage reported that congregants John and Lucille Rainey Green had established a scholarship fund to support St. John's youth in attending college.

In October 2025, St. John hosted a community meeting on a proposal to incorporate the Pawleys Island-Litchfield area, attended by approximately 100 residents along with Georgetown County Council members and civic leaders.

=== 150th anniversary and historical marker ===
On April 8, 2017, the congregation celebrated its 150th anniversary with a ceremony unveiling a South Carolina historical marker (No. 22-65) placed in front of the church. The marker was sponsored by the church itself, with Georgetown County Public Services involved in its approval and installation. Georgetown County Public Services Director Ray Funnye credited the late Virginia Skinner with initiating the process that led to the marker.

Speakers at the unveiling included pastor Rev. Harvey Doctor; longtime member Norman Reid; Arlene Grate, chairwoman of the church's historical marker committee; Rev. Dr. Sandy L. Drayton, Georgetown District Presiding Elder; Funnye; and Georgetown County Councilman Steve Goggans, who spoke about the history of the African Methodist Episcopal Church as, in his words, the oldest independent Protestant denomination founded by Black people.

== Description ==
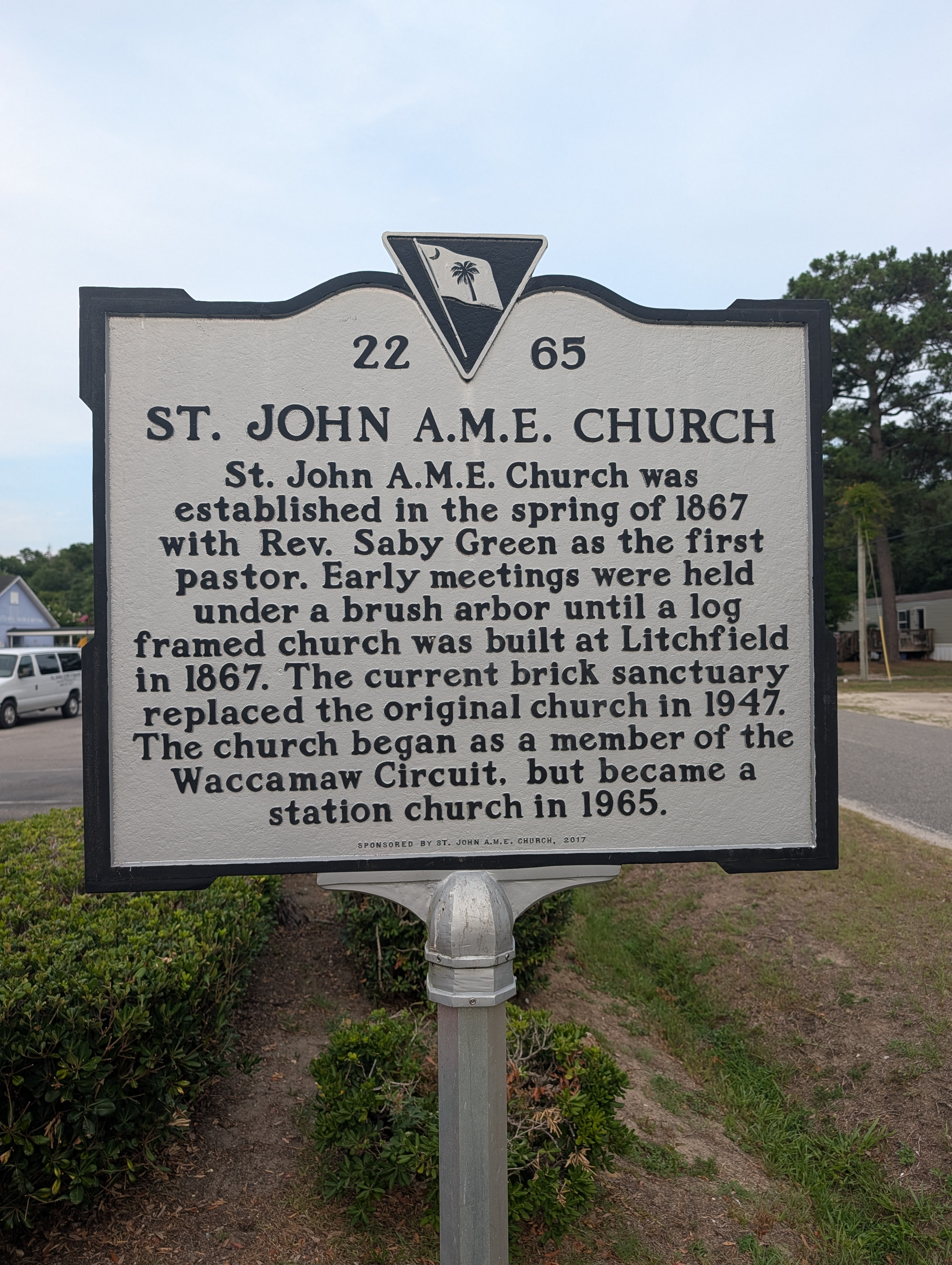
South Carolina historical marker No. 22-65

The church's historical marker inscription reads, in part:

St. John A.M.E. Church was established in the spring of 1867 with Rev. Saby Green as the first pastor. Early meetings were held under a brush arbor until a log framed church was built at Litchfield in 1867. The current brick sanctuary replaced the original church in 1947. The church began as a member of the Waccamaw Circuit, but became a station church in 1965.

The marker stands at the intersection of Duncan Avenue and Godfrey Road, on the west side of Duncan Avenue.
