= Barry Preedom =

American physicist (1940–2025)

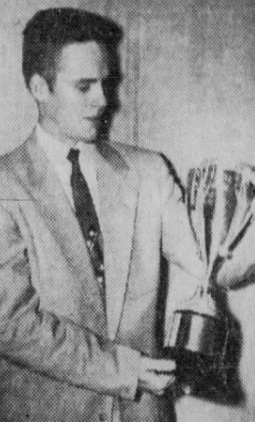
- Preedom in 1958
- Born: Barry Mason Preedom; December 31, 1940; Stamford, Connecticut, U.S.
- Died: May 4, 2025 (aged 84); Pawleys Island, South Carolina, U.S.
- Education: Spring Hill College; University of Tennessee
- Occupation: Physicist

Barry Mason Preedom (December 31, 1940 – May 4, 2025) was an American physicist.

== Life and career ==
Preedom was born in Stamford, Connecticut, the son of Louis Merle Preedom and Velma Kimball. He attended St. John's High School, graduating in 1958. After graduating, he attended Spring Hill College, earning his BS degree in 1962. He also attended the University of Tennessee, earning his MS degree in 1964 and his PhD degree in nuclear physics in 1967.

Preedom served as a professor in the department of physics and astronomy at the University of South Carolina from 1976 to 2006. During his years as a professor, in 1995, he was named a distinguished professor.

== Death ==
Preedom died on May 4, 2025, in Pawleys Island, South Carolina, at the age of 84.
