= James Terry Roach =

Executed American murderer (1960–1986)

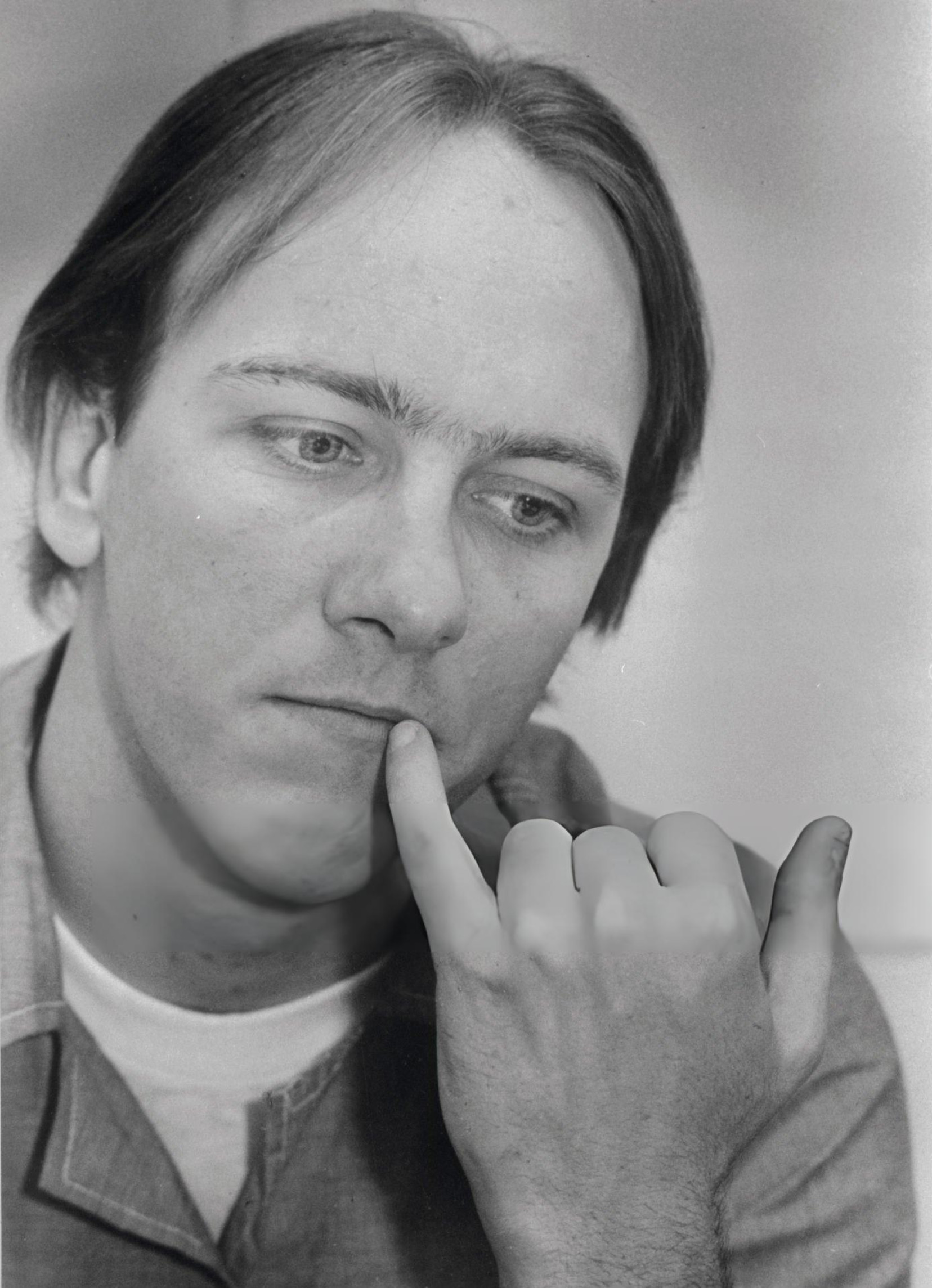
- Roach in 1986, shortly before his execution
- Born: February 18, 1960; Greenville, South Carolina, U.S.
- Died: January 10, 1986 (aged 25); Central Correctional Institution, South Carolina, U.S.
- Known for: First juvenile offender executed involuntarily in the United States since 1964
- Status: Executed by electrocution
- Convictions: Murder (3 counts); Kidnapping; Rape; Criminal sexual conduct Armed robbery Conspiracy (3 counts)
- Penalty: Death (December 16, 1977)

James Terry Roach (February 18, 1960 – January 10, 1986) was the second person to be executed by the state of South Carolina following the 1976 decision by the U.S. Supreme Court reauthorizing the use of capital punishment by the states. He was electrocuted on January 10, 1986, aged 25, nearly a year to the day following the electrocution of his accomplice, Joseph Carl Shaw, on January 11, 1985, at the Central Correctional Institution in Columbia. Roach was executed for a crime he committed at age 17. This, combined with his borderline intellectual disabilities, made his execution highly controversial.

Roach was the first juvenile offender to be executed involuntarily in the United States since 1964. Another juvenile offender, Charles Rumbaugh, had been executed in Texas in 1985. However, the other execution had drawn far less controversy since Rumbaugh had wanted to die and had already tried to kill himself three times. Rumbaugh had also attempted suicide by cop by trying to stab a federal marshal with a makeshift weapon during a court hearing.

== Murders ==
After the sudden end of his relationship, Joseph Carl Shaw, a friend of Roach, decided to go out and find a woman to gang rape as revenge. In the early hours of October 17, Shaw, as well as Roach, Ronald Eugene Mahaffey, and Robert Neil Williams, came across 21-year-old Betty Swank. The four offered her a ride in their car. Once Swank got inside, she saw that they were in possession of a gun. She was kidnapped and gang raped. The group initially planned to release Swank alive, but Shaw decided to kill her when she recognized him. After the other three refused to kill her, Shaw shot and killed Swank with a .22 caliber rifle. Her dead body was found in a mobile home park.

On October 29, 1977, Roach, Shaw, and Mahaffey spent the morning drinking beer and doing drugs. The three then spent the early afternoon driving around in an attempt to "find a girl to rape," according to Mahaffey.

After pulling beside a parked car at a baseball field outside of Columbia, South Carolina, Roach aimed a .22 caliber rifle at the car's occupants, 14-year-old Carlotta Hartness and 17-year-old Thomas Taylor. Roach demanded they give them their money and Taylor obliged. Shaw and Mahaffey then got out of the car, took Taylor's keys, and forced Hartness into the backseat of Shaw's car. Once back in the car, Shaw said to Roach, "OK, now!" to which Roach fired the rifle into the parked car, killing Thomas Taylor.

Hartness was then driven to a dirt road not far away where they demanded she undress. She was forced to perform oral sex on Shaw and Mahaffey and was raped repeatedly by all three. Once they were finished, Shaw asked who would kill her, after which Roach, albeit hesitant at first, volunteered. Shaw ordered Hartness to lie face down on the ground, to which she initially refused and pleaded with them to spare her life. Eventually giving in to their demands, she put her face to the ground, and Roach shot her several times in the head. Shaw shot her in the head once more, then buried the rifle, ammunition, and wallet they had stolen from Taylor earlier. The three then returned to the baseball field to confirm that Taylor was dead.

== Trial and sentencing ==
On December 13, 1977, upon the advice of his lawyer, Roach pleaded guilty to two counts of murder, criminal sexual conduct, kidnapping, and robbery. Evidence presented at the trial showed that Roach was mentally handicapped, with an I.Q. between 75 and 80 and that he was probably suffering from Huntington's Chorea. Moreover, the sentencing judge found that Roach was under the influence of Shaw when the crimes were committed. Despite these mitigating factors, the sentencing judge declared that the death penalty was warranted in this case.

On February 17, 1978, Roach pleaded no contest to murder, rape, and conspiracy in the slaying of Betty Swank and was sentenced to life in prison plus 40 years.

Roach's sentence was upheld on appeal by the South Carolina Supreme Court. Several attempts to seek review of the case or to bring a petition of habeas corpus were unsuccessful. The US Supreme Court declined to grant him certiorari. Pleas for legal reconsideration came from the United Nations, international figures, and former president Jimmy Carter.

In a final plea the day before the execution, one of Roach's lawyers, David I. Bruck, told the governor that the state already bore the stigma of the execution of 14-year-old George Stinney over 40 years ago. However, Governor Richard Riley ultimately refused to grant clemency to Roach.

== Execution ==
On January 10, 1986, Roach was strapped into the electric chair and gave his final words: "To the family of the victims, my heart is still with you in your sorrow. May you forgive me just as I know my lord has done. To my family and friends, there is only three words to say: I love you." He then gave a thumbs-up sign, reportedly to signal he was ready to die. He was pronounced dead at 5:16 a.m.

Roach was the first juvenile offender to be executed in South Carolina since 1948, when 17-year-old Matthew Jaminson Jr. was executed for rape. At the time of Roper v. Simmons in 2005, there were three juvenile offenders on death row in South Carolina, Herman Lee Hughes Jr., Eric Dale Morgan, and Ted Benjamin Powers. Two others, William Arthur Kelly and Robert Lewis Conyers, had been awaiting resentencing hearings after their sentence were vacated on appeal. The hearing had been delayed until the ruling was made, after which both Kelly and Conyers were resentenced to life in prison.

At the time of their crimes, Hughes, Powers, and Conyers were all 16, while Kelly and Morgan were both 17. Morgan less than two weeks shy of his 18th birthday. The cases of Hughes, Morgan, and Powers all involved the murder of a man during a robbery in which other aggravating factors had been present.

Kelly had sentenced to death for murdering 25-year-old Shirley Shealy. Kelly had bound Shealy's hands behind her back, after which he stabbed her 31 times, slit her throat from ear to ear, and left dollar bills fastened to her bloodied body. According to testimony by a cellmate, Kelly said he and Shealy had planned to rob the KFC where they worked, but that Shealy had turned on him during the robbery. Kelly had also planned to take a female jail guard hostage with a homemade knife and bragged about the murder, requesting that he call himself "KFC" and walking around with a cup with the drawing of a beheaded chicken that had been stabbed with a knife. His death sentence had been vacated in a 5-4 decision by U.S. Supreme Court in 2002 after the justices ruled that juries had to be told when life without parole is an alternative to a death sentence.

Conyers was sentenced to death for murdering 2-year-old Kimberly Sims during a home invasion on November 24, 1991. Conyers had raped the girl's mother and broke nearly every bone in her face. The mother was blinded, but said she heard her daughter calling her name before she was beaten to death by Conyers. Conyers also attempted to beat the girl's 5-year-old brother to death as he slept. At the sentencing hearing for Conyers, the prosecution also presented evidence of several other crimes he committed. In 1989, Conyers, then 14, had raped a woman and stabbed her to death. Five days after the attack on the Sims' family, Conyers had broken into the home of another woman and beat her in the face with a board with nails in it to the point that her left eye came out of its socket. On February 22, 1992, Conyers had tried to rape a woman during another home invasion. When she resisted, he stabbed her in the shoulder and beat her in the face, breaking her jaw and knocking out her teeth in the process. He was finally arrested several days later. An appellate court noted that during this entire period, Conyers had attended high school and participated in sports and church activities as usual.

The case of Roach was brought before the Inter-American Commission on Human Rights, which found by five votes to one that the United States Government had violated Article I (Right to Life) and Article II (right to equality before the law) of the American Declaration of the Rights and Duties of Man in executing Roach. This was the first time the United States was found to be in violation of its human rights obligations under the aforementioned Declaration.

== See also ==
- List of people executed in South Carolina
- List of people executed in the United States in 1986
- Roper v. Simmons: 2005 U.S. Supreme Court ruling that the execution of those under 18 (at the time of committing the capital crime) is unconstitutional.
- Thompson v. Oklahoma: 1988 U.S. Supreme Court ruling that the execution of those who committed their crime when under the age of 16 is unconstitutional.

== Sources ==
- U.S. Executions Since 1976, at The Office of the Clark County Prosecuting Attorney . Retrieved on 2007-11-12.
- Shuler, Rita Y (August 1, 2006). Carolina Crimes: Case Files of a Forensic Photographer. The History Press. ISBN 9781596291669.
- Roach v. Martin, 757 F.2d 1463 (4th Cir. March 20, 1985).

Executions carried out in South Carolina
Preceded by Joseph Carl Shaw January 11, 1985	James Terry Roach; January 10, 1986	Succeeded by Ronald Woomer April 27, 1990
Executions carried out in the United States
Preceded by Carroll Cole – Nevada December 6, 1985	James Terry Roach – South Carolina; January 10, 1986	Succeeded by Charles Bass – Texas March 12, 1986
