= Pawleys Island, South Carolina =

- Town
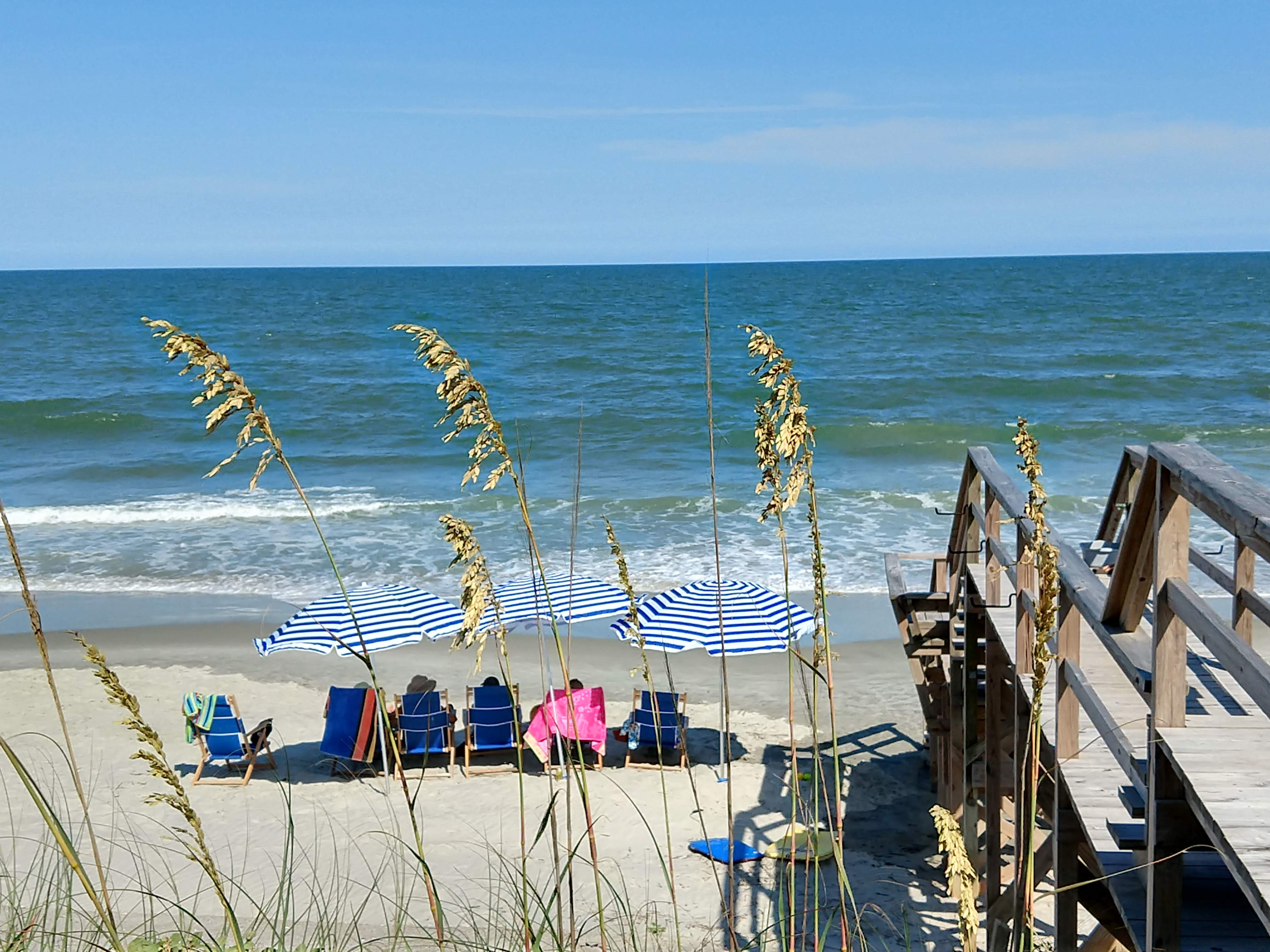
- Beach at Pawleys Island, South Carolina

- Red circle shows the location within Georgetown County and the state of South Carolina.
- Coordinates: 33°25′18″N 79°07′40″W
- Country: United States
- State: South Carolina
- County: Georgetown
- Incorporated (town): 1938
- Incorporated (city): 1957

Area
  - Total: 0.99 sq mi (2.57 km^{2})
  - Land: 0.70 sq mi (1.82 km^{2})
  - Water: 0.29 sq mi (0.75 km^{2})
- Elevation: 0 ft (0 m)

Population (2020)
  - Total: 130
  - Density: 185.4/sq mi (71.57/km^{2})
- Time zone: UTC-5 (EST)
  - Summer (DST): UTC−4 (EDT)
- ZIP Code: 29585
- Area codes: 843, 854
- FIPS code: 45-55015
- GNIS feature ID: 2407082
- Website: www.townofpawleysisland.com,

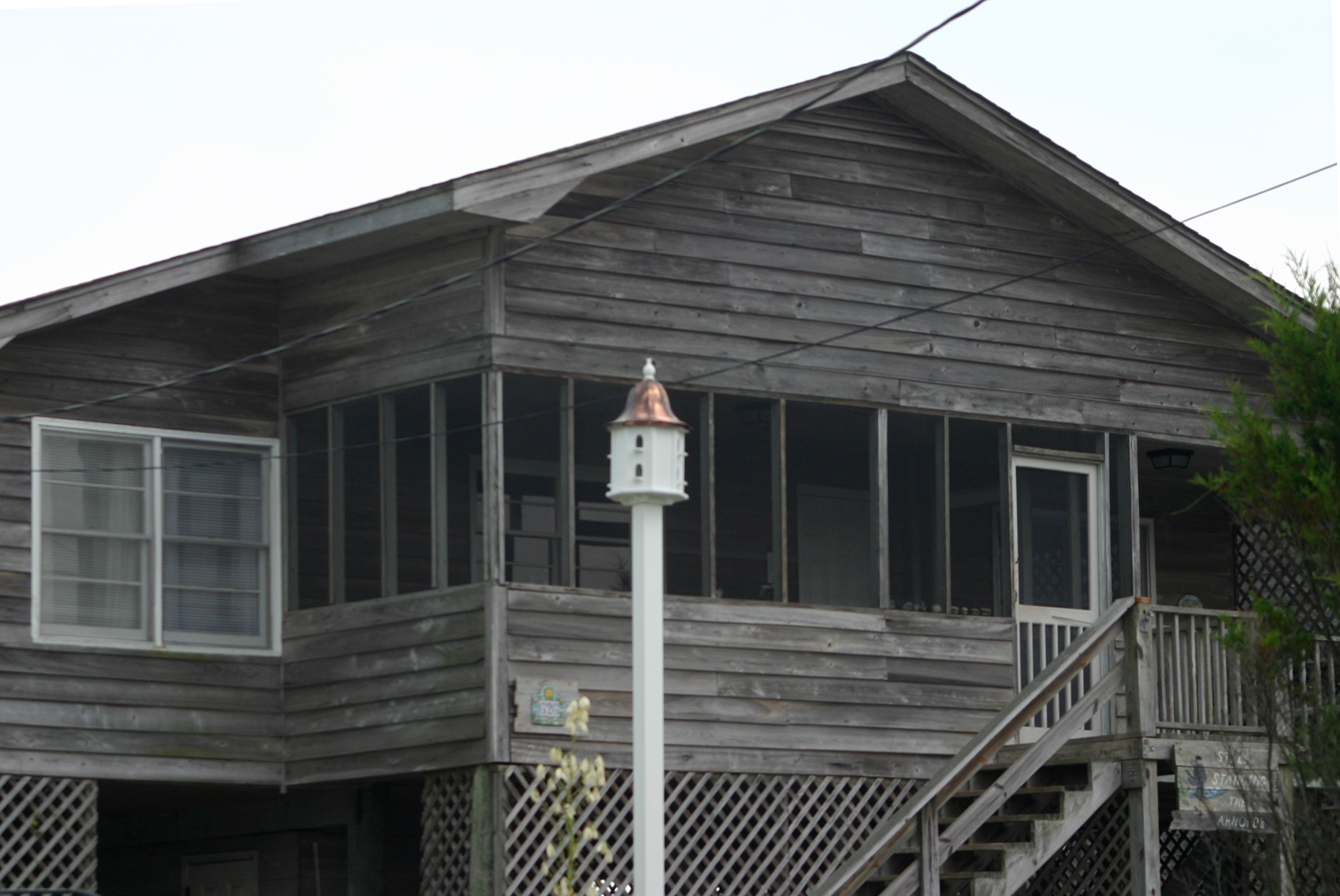
A surviving home, pre-Hurricane Hugo (1989)

Pawleys Island is a town in Georgetown County, South Carolina, United States, and the Atlantic coast barrier island on which the town is located.

As of the 2020 census, Pawleys Island had a population of 130. The post office address also includes an unincorporated area on the mainland adjacent to the island, which is also commonly referred to as Pawleys Island and includes a commercial district along the Ocean Highway (US Route 17) as well as a residential area between the highway and the Waccamaw River. The town of Pawleys Island, though, is only on the island. The island lies off the Waccamaw Neck, a long, narrow peninsula between the ocean and the river, and is connected to the mainland by two bridges, the North Causeway and the South Causeway. It is on the southern end of The Grand Strand and is one of the oldest resort areas of the US East Coast.

== History ==
The earliest known inhabitants of the Pawleys Island area were the Waccamaw and Winyah people, two Native American tribes whose history dates back more than 10,000 years. The ancient Waccamaw lived in communities along the Waccamaw River, an area stretching from Lake Waccamaw in North Carolina to Winyah Bay in Georgetown, South Carolina. Archaeological sites containing Waccamaw shell 'middens' (mounds) indicate that clams and oysters were popular foods. The Waccamaw were successful farmers, raising a variety of crops, and were skilled at domesticating animals including deer, chickens, ducks, geese, and other fowl.

The first Europeans in the area arrived from Spain in 1521. European colonization had a devastating impact on the Waccamaw and Winyah people, many of whom were captured and enslaved, starved to death when their farms and hunting grounds were seized, or died from the introduction of European diseases. While the Winyah disappeared by 1720, the Waccamaw and its rich culture still exist today as the Waccamaw Indian People of Conway, South Carolina. The Waccamaw tribe is a founding member of the South Carolina Indian Affairs Commission and has worked for decades with South Carolina governors to improve the lives and status of the state's first inhabitants.

Pawleys Island's history as a beach resort began in the early 1700s. Town namesake George Pawley, who inherited the island through a land grant to his father, sold parcels to wealthy rice planters seeking a coastal summer refuge from malaria-causing mosquitoes.

In 1791, President George Washington toured the Grand Strand, traveling The King's Highway to an unincorporated portion of Pawleys Island to visit the Alstons, who owned several plantations in the area.

With Hurricane Hugo in 1989, some island cottages were swept away and have since been replaced. The island bans commercial or industrial buildings with the exception of a 1970s condominium complex and a few grandfathered inns, including the SeaView Inn and the PCJ Weston House, which is now the Pelican Inn.

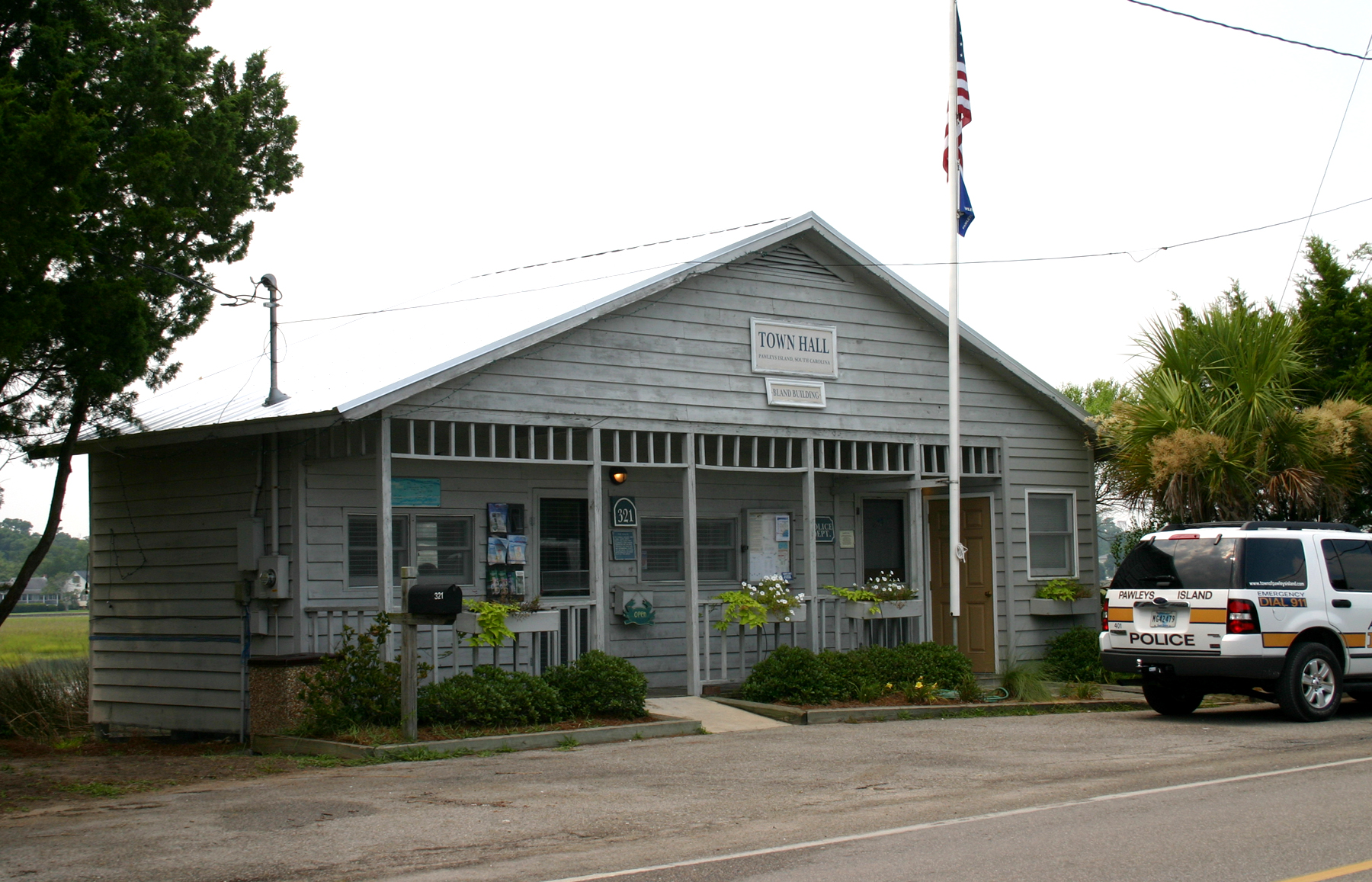
Pawleys Island, South Carolina Town Hall

The town government was incorporated in 1985. The water temperature is comfortable from May to October, and there is abundant fishing, crabbing, shrimping, and birdwatching most months of the year.

All Saints Church, Cedar Grove Plantation Chapel, and Pawleys Island Historic District are listed on the National Register of Historic Places.

== Geography ==
The Town of Pawleys Island is located just off U.S. Route 17, approximately 10 miles (16 km) east of Georgetown. The island itself, located at 33°25′47″N 79°07′18″W, is a little over 3 miles (4.8 km) long and about 1/4 mile (0.40 km) wide. To the east-southeast lies the Atlantic Ocean. The island is a sandy barrier, with some dunes on the northern end up to about 15 feet (4.6 m) high. The southern end is very low. Behind the island is a tidal creek/marsh.

According to the United States Census Bureau, the town has a total area of 1.0 square mile (2.6 km^{2}), of which 0.7 square miles (1.8 km^{2}) is land and 0.3 square miles (0.78 km^{2}) (29.29%) is water.

== Demographics ==
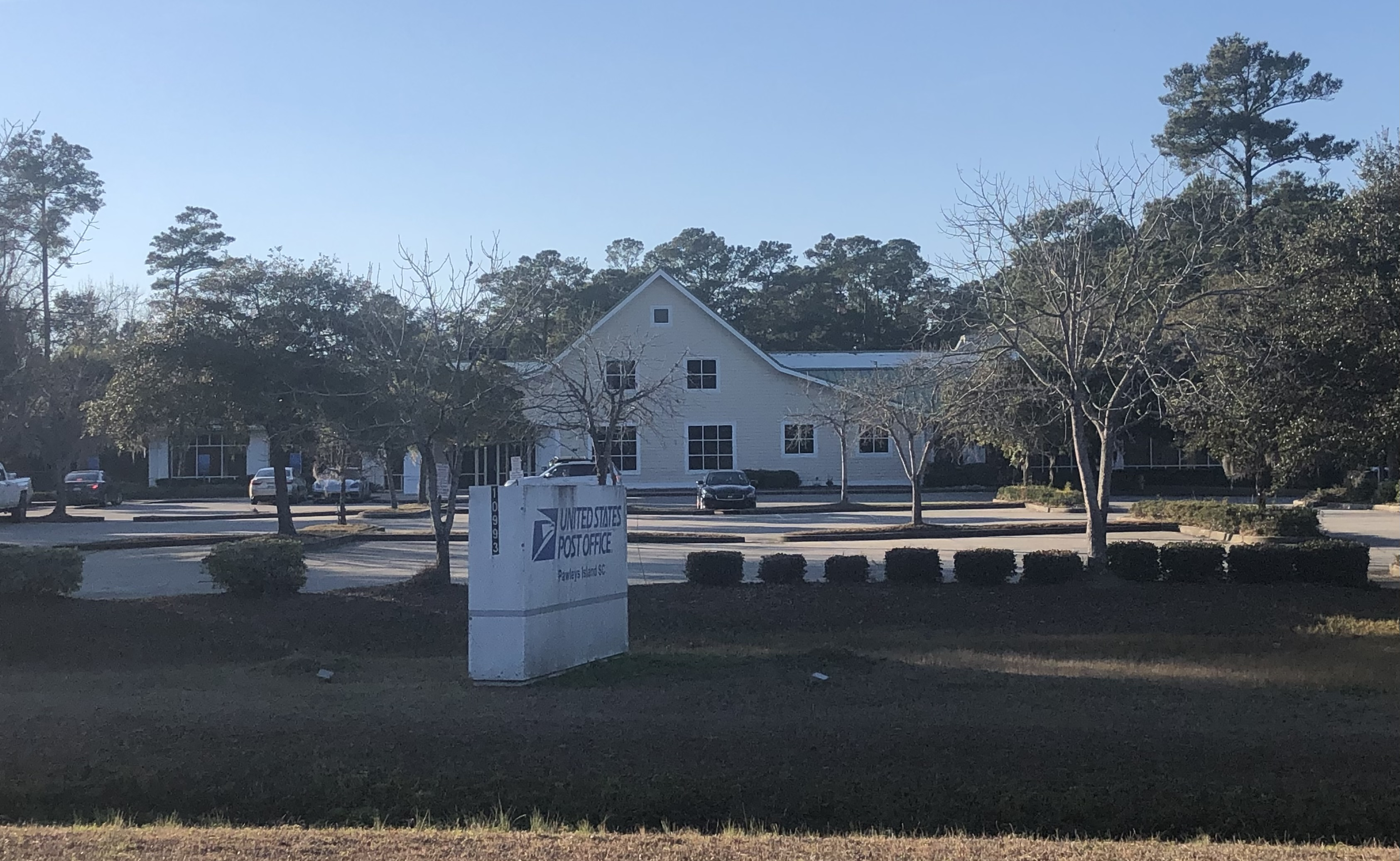
Pawleys Island Post Office

Historical population
Census	Pop.	Note	%±
1990	176		—
2000	138		−21.6%
2010	103		−25.4%
2020	130		26.2%
U.S. Decennial Census

As of the census of 2000, there were 138 people, 81 households, and 43 families residing in the town. The population density was 196.9 inhabitants per square mile (76.0/km^{2}). There were 521 housing units at an average density of 743.3 per square mile (287.0/km^{2}). The racial makeup of the town was 92.03% White, 7.25% African American, and 0.72% from two or more races.

There were 81 households, out of which 9.9% had children under the age of 18 living with them, 50.6% were married couples living together, 1.2% had a female householder with no husband present, and 46.9% were non-families. 45.7% of all households were made up of individuals, and 17.3% had someone living alone who was 65 years of age or older. The average household size was 1.70 and the average family size was 2.30.

In the town, the population was spread out, with 8.0% under the age of 18, 15.9% from 25 to 44, 50.7% from 45 to 64, and 25.4% who were 65 years of age or older. The median age was 55 years. For every 100 females, there were 76.9 males. For every 100 females age 18 and over, there were 78.9 males.

The median income for a household in the town was $51,964, and the median income for a family was $97,125. Males had a median income of $28,750 versus $27,500 for females. The per capita income for the town was $48,183. There were none of the families and 1.5% of the population living below the poverty line, including none under 18 and none of those over 64.

== The Gray Man ghost ==
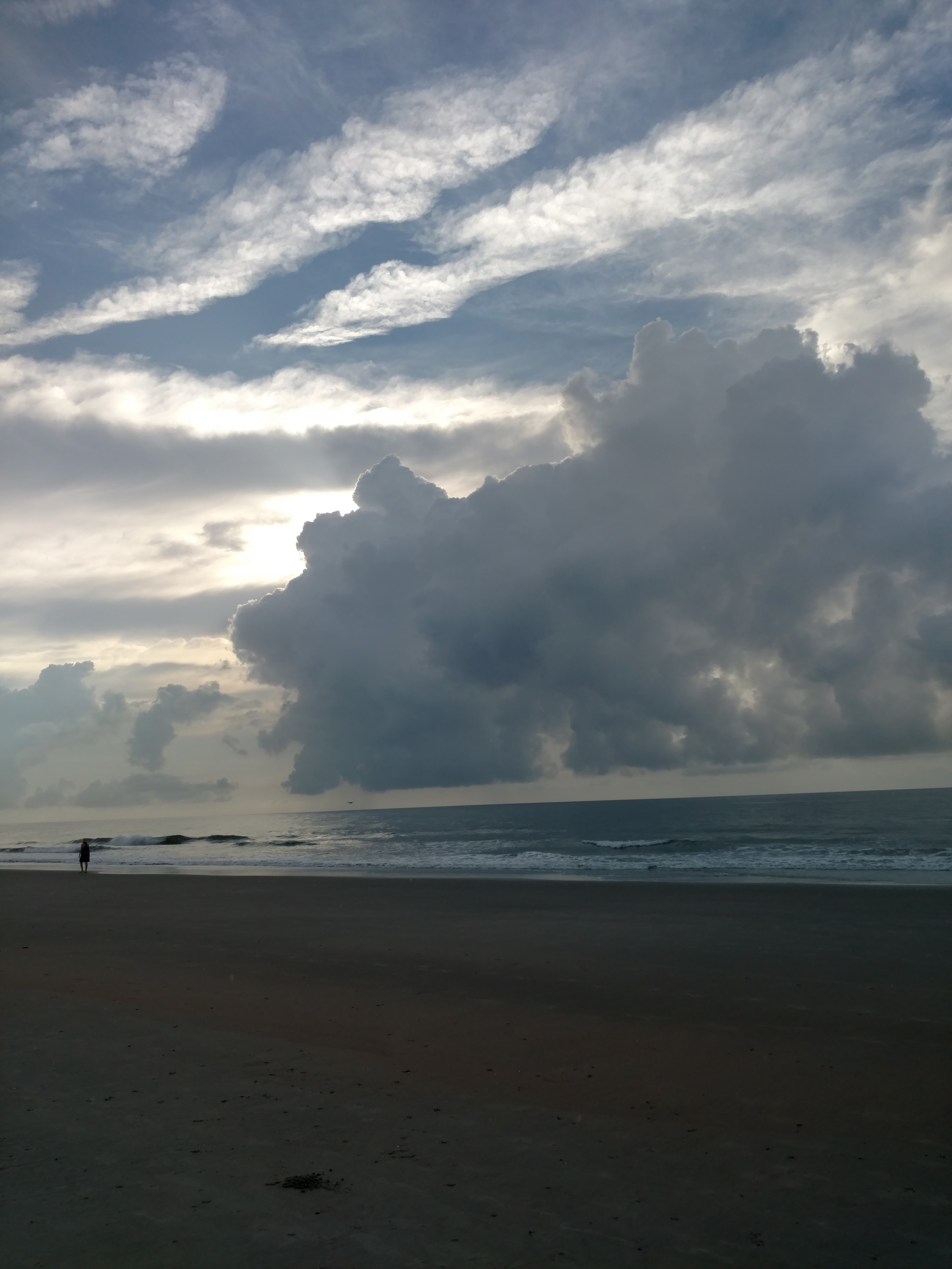
Sky and beach at Pawleys Island

The Gray Man is a famous purported ghost local to Pawleys Island and is said to have walked the coastline for nearly 200 years. His presence is said to warn of hurricanes and other dangers.

The most common origin story of the Gray Man is that in 1822 a young woman was staying on the island with her family when she received word that her fiancé was going to join her there. Delighted with the news, she prepared all of his favorite dishes in anticipation of his arrival. However as her fiancé was traveling to the house he challenged his servants to a race on their horses. As they raced he saw a shortcut through a marsh and decided to take it. The horse stumbled in the marsh, throwing him off the horse, and despite his servants' efforts to free him he sank into the mud.

The news of her fiancé's death nearly drove the girl mad, and she had distressing waking and night-dream visions of him. Her family took her to Charleston to see a doctor; within hours of their leaving a hurricane hit the coast and almost all of the Pawleys Island inhabitants died, but the family's house was untouched.Pawleys Island, South Carolina

== Education ==
Pawleys Island has a public library, a branch of the Georgetown County Library.

== Notable people ==
The following people were born on Pawleys Island:

- Barry Preedom (1940–2025), physicist
- Elizabeth Allston Pringle (1845–1921), plantation owner and writer

== See also ==
- St. John African Methodist Episcopal Church (Pawleys Island, South Carolina)
