= South Carolina Penitentiary =

Former prison in South Carolina, United States

Coordinates: 34°00′09″N 81°03′04″W

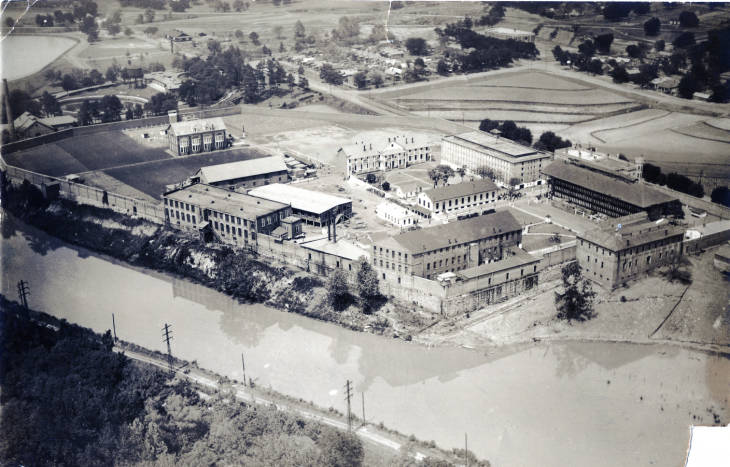
- Aerial view of South Carolina State Penitentiary taken in 1932.
- Interactive map of the South Carolina Penitentiary area

General information
- Location: Columbia, South Carolina, 1511 Williams Street
- Completed: 1866
- Destroyed: 1999

The South Carolina Penitentiary (SCP) (renamed the Central Correctional Institution (CCI) in 1965) was the state of South Carolina's first prison. Completed in 1867, the South Carolina Penitentiary served as the primary state prison for nearly 130 years until its demolition in 1999. It was located adjacent to the Congaree River in Columbia, South Carolina and was added to the National Register of Historic Places on January 4, 1996. It was replaced by the Lee Correctional Institution as the main prison in the state of South Carolina after the prison was deemed too overcrowded by a federal court.

== History ==
In 1866, Construction of the penitentiary was approved by the South Carolina General Assembly. It was the first state penitentiary in South Carolina and essentially the start of the state's penal system. Previously, all jailing had been handled by counties, which were financially ill-equipped after the Civil War. The Penitentiary accepted its first convict in 1867. The majority of prisoners were African American. Until 1937, women were also housed at the penitentiary in separate housing from the men.

The penitentiary was also created partly in response to the freeing of slaves who had previously been disciplined by slave holders rather than by a criminal-justice system, making for a greater strain on the counties. In the 1870s, after Wade Hampton III was elected Governor of South Carolina, the board members and superintendents made the penitentiary largely self-sufficient by leasing convict labor. Life for leased convicts could be hard. Prisoners mined phosphate in the lowcountry during the 1860s and 1870s. Additionally, between September 1877 and April 1879, the Greenwood and Augusta Railroad leased 285 prisoners and 128 of them perished under the railroad's control.

Because of negative press coverage of the deaths of prisoners leased to external companies, South Carolina began using convict labor within the confines of the penitentiary. In 1883, the Columbia Hosiery company established a hosiery mill on the prison’s premises, with convicts producing stockings and other knitted goods. In 1917, the hosiery mill was converted to a furniture factory operated by the Fiber Craft Chair Company. In May 1922, anger at harsh living conditions in the penitentiary sparked a riot by convicts working in the furniture factory. Reinforced by local police, prison guards suppressed the riot with gunfire, killing at least one prisoner and wounding many others.

In 1965, the Penitentiary was renamed the Central Correctional Institution. The penitentiary remained the only maximum-security prison in South Carolina until 1975 and the primary prison in the state until its demolition in 1999. Due to extreme over crowding at the time, 100 temporary cells were placed on the floor of the main cell block. The state was ordered in 1990 by a federal judge to create a prisoner-reduction plan to remedy the problem. The Corrections Department spent $202 million and built seven new prisons to fulfill the plan's requirements. Before the prison was decommissioned, it was the oldest prison in the United States still in use. The Department of Corrections temporarily gave tours of the old facility before its demolition. It was removed from the Register on December 8, 2005.

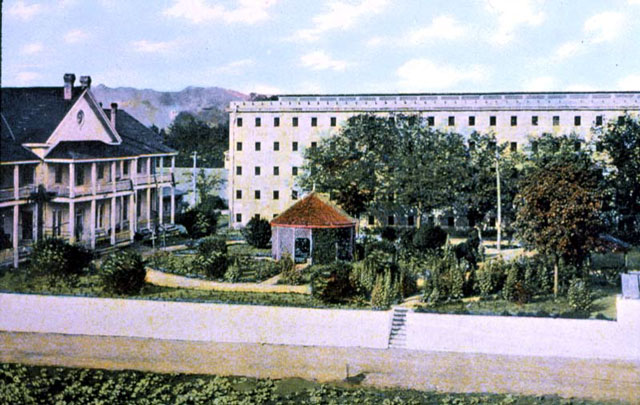
A 1910 Postcard depicting the South Carolina Penitentiary.

== Life at the prison ==
=== Escapes and violence ===
The average prisoner at the penitentiary was serving a sentence of 23 years compared to the state average of 12. For this reason, escapes were a constant concern of guards. Six prisoners who attempted to escape in 1937 killed the prison guard captain in the process. Afterwards, all 6 inmates were convicted of murder and were executed in South Carolina's electric chair. In 1971, four prisoners escaped by widening a toilet drain and following the storm drain into the Columbia Canal. When serial killer Pee Wee Gaskins served as an inmate at the penitentiary he famously blew up a fellow prisoner named Rudolph Tyner with a plastic explosive. In 1991, Gaskins was executed in the electric chair for the crime.

=== Administration ===
Prisoners were required to have short hair by the South Carolina Department of Corrections. This requirement was challenged in court. In 1999, the same year the Penitentiary closed, the United States Court of Appeals for the Fourth Circuit ruled the requirement was constitutional. During the mid-1990s, programs for mental health were cut at the prison. Until the mid-1880s, prisoners were buried in a small plot within the prison yards. However, in 1883, the Department of Corrections purchased the land for the new Penitentiary Cemetery located between Elmwood Cemetery and the Columbia Canal. Until 1915, the prison did not keep death records on any of its prisoners. Researchers have estimated that 1,900 prisoners were buried in the cemetery and the area surrounding it, only 279 prisoners of the 1,900 prisoners have been identified. In the 1980s, the South Carolina's Budget and Control Board took control of the cemetery. The Board relinquished control to the city of Columbia in 2000.

== Prison layout ==
Initial construction took place in 1867. The first permanent building was the South Wing Cell Block, which served as a cell block until 1927 when it was demolished. Started around the same time, North Wing Cell Block or as it is more commonly known, Cell Block One, was completed in 1886. North Wing stood five stories tall, built from granite with the tops of the walls crenellated. For prisoners, the tunnel between their living quarters and the prison church was the only "way to get to living, working and eating areas." The tunnel was problematic for prison control and was a frequent location for prison stabbings.

The interior was essentially an Auburn-style cell block, but in the Baltimore pattern variation where the cells lined the exterior. Interior shower stalls were located on the north wall. The cells were approximately 5 by 6 feet (1.5 m × 1.8 m) with a ceiling height of 6.5 ft (2.0 m) and door openings of 25 ft (7.6 m). The metal catwalks were attached on the exterior of the cell block and was 3 ft (0.9 m) in width. This was, much later, followed by heavy wire fencing material and a guard rail on each tier. The initial complex comprised two cell blocks and an administrative building. It would later evolve into a more diverse institution, including a hospital and separate blocks for females and juvenile inmates. Historically significant structures included the boundary wall, made of granite and brick, the North Wing Cell Block, the electric chair building, the Richards building, and the Chair Factory building.

The oldest section of the prison, Cell Block One was condemned before the prison was closed for good. Prisoners who were willing to stay in that cell block signed waivers to do so. The cell block was desirable because prisoners typically didn't have cellmates in their cells.

== Capital punishment ==
From 1912 to 1990, death row was housed at the State Penitentiary changing over historically to Central Correctional Institution in Columbia. Prior to shutting down the penitentiary, the death house was moved to a newer facility at Broad River Correctional Institution, in January 1990. The first electrocution took place on August 6, 1912. Prior to that date, state executions were carried out by means of hanging in individual counties.

Before the South Carolina Penitentiary closed, 243 people were executed by electric chair within the prison. The youngest person executed was 14-year-old George Stinney Jr., his 1944 death marked the youngest lawful execution in the United States during the 20th century. In December 2014, that conviction was vacated. Death row for men is now located at Broad River Correctional Institution.

== Notable people ==
=== Inmates ===
- George Stinney Jr. (1929-1944), wrongfully convicted; accused of raping and killing two girls in March 1944; executed by electric chair
- Willie Tolbert (1924-1949), rapist; kidnapped and repeatedly raped a 16-year-old girl; executed by electric chair
- Donald Henry Gaskins (1933-1991), serial killer and rapist; killed an inmate at the penitentiary in 1982; executed by electric chair
- Joseph Carl Shaw (1955-1985), murderer; executed by electric chair
- James Terry Roach (1960-1986), murderer, Shaw's accomplice, and last juvenile offender to be executed in the state; executed by electric chair

=== Staff ===
- Charles J. Stolbrand (1821–1894), Swedish sergeant; was the penitentiary's superintendent (1869–1873)

== See also ==
- Auburn system
- List of South Carolina state prisons
- List of United States state prisons
