= Joseph Carl Shaw =

Executed American murderer (1955–1985)

- A photo taken of Shaw as he was taken to a holding cell shortly before his execution (January 8, 1985)
- Born: March 31, 1955; Louisville, Kentucky, U.S.
- Died: January 11, 1985 (aged 29); Central Correctional Institution, Columbia, South Carolina, U.S.
- Cause of death: Execution by electrocution
- Other name: J.C.
- Motive: Drug-induced rage over the end of his relationship Misogyny
- Convictions: Murder (3 counts); Kidnapping; Rape (2 counts); Criminal sexual conduct Armed robbery Conspiracy (3 counts)
- Penalty: Death (December 16, 1977)

Details
- Victims: Betty Swank, 21; Thomas Taylor, 17; Carlotta Hartness, 14
- Span of crimes: October 17 – October 29, 1977
- Location: Richland County, South Carolina
- Date apprehended: November 3, 1977

Joseph Carl Shaw (March 31, 1955 – January 11, 1985) was an American convicted murderer and the first person executed by the state of South Carolina after the U.S. Supreme Court reauthorized the use of capital punishment in 1976. Shaw was executed for the 1977 murders of three people in Richland County, South Carolina. One of his accomplices, James Terry Roach, was also sentenced to death and was executed in 1986.

== Early life ==
Joseph Carl Shaw was born to Mary and Melvin Shaw in Louisville, Kentucky, and grew up in the suburb of Jeffersontown. He attended St. Edwards Catholic Middle School and played on the football team. Shaw also regularly attended church and became an altar boy. After leaving St. Edwards he moved on to Jeffersontown High School but dropped out before graduating.

After leaving high school, Shaw enlisted in the army and sought admission to the Military Police School. He graduated in 1975 and was stationed at Fort Jackson in Columbia, South Carolina in 1977. There, he met 17-year-old James Terry Roach, 16-year-old Ronald Eugene Mahaffey, and 21-year-old Robert Neil Williams. The four would often spend their days getting high and drinking alcohol. Shaw also got into a relationship with a woman around this time, but the relationship ended abruptly on October 16, 1977.

== Murders ==
=== Betty Swank ===
The next day, Shaw, Roach, Mahaffey, and Williams consumed large quantities of drugs and alcohol. In a drug-induced rage about the end of his relationship, Shaw and his accomplices decided to go out and find a woman to rape. In the early hours of October 17, the four men came across 21-year-old Betty Swank. The men offered her a ride in their car. Once Swank got inside, she saw that they were in possession of a gun. She was kidnapped and gang raped. The group initially planned to let her go afterwards, but Shaw changed his mind after Swank recognized him from the military base. After Shaw released Swank and walked her away from the group's car, Williams, who had a .22 caliber rifle, was supposed to kill her, but did not fire. When Shaw returned to the car, Williams said he couldn't kill Swank. When Shaw got back into the car and drove away, the four argued over who would kill Betty. When the other three refused, Shaw took initiative. He drove back to Betty, who was walking to a trailer park to get help, and opened fire on her. When she screamed and started running, Shaw fired another three shots striking her once in the shoulder and once in the back. Betty made it to the trailer park before collapsing. Her dead body was found in a mobile home park.

=== Thomas Taylor and Carlotta Hartness ===
On October 29, 1977, Shaw, Roach, and Mahaffey spent the morning taking drugs and drinking alcohol. In the afternoon they decided to see if they could "find a girl to rape." The three men drove to a baseball park northeast of Columbia where they saw a parked car occupied by 17-year-old Thomas Taylor and 14-year-old Carlotta Hartness. Shaw pulled up beside the parked car and Roach pointed a .22 caliber rifle through the car window at Taylor demanding money. Taylor gave the men his wallet while Shaw forced Hartness into the back seat of his car. Shaw then gave orders for Roach to kill Taylor. Roach then shot and killed Taylor, who was still sitting in his parked car.

Hartness was taken to a dirt road a short distance away where she was raped repeatedly by each of the men. Hartness was shot in the head by Roach and then shot again by Shaw, who fired into Hartness's head, killing her. The men left the scene, disposed of the rifle, and returned to the baseball park to confirm that Taylor was dead. Later that night, Shaw returned to the scene of Hartness's murder and mutilated her body. Both the bodies of Taylor and Hartness were discovered the following day.

== Trial ==
Shaw, Roach, and Mahaffey were captured and arrested on November 3, 1977. Each of the three men were indicted for two counts of murder, two counts of conspiracy, rape, kidnapping, and armed robbery. The state elected to seek the death penalty for Shaw and Roach. As a result of plea negotiations, the state did not seek the death penalty against Mahaffey in exchange for his testimony against Shaw and Roach.

On December 12, 1977, Shaw pleaded guilty to all charges. Roach pleaded guilty to two counts of murder, rape, kidnapping and armed robbery. On December 16, 1977, the two were sentenced to death. Mahaffey was sentenced to life in prison.

On February 17, 1978, Shaw, Mahaffey, and Williams all pleaded guilty to the kidnapping, gang rape, and murder of Betty Swank in exchange for avoiding the death penalty in that case. Roach pleaded no contest. All four defendants were sentenced to life in prison plus 40 years. Mahaffey died in prison at the age of 41 on February 13, 2003. Williams, who was not involved in the murders of Taylor and Hartness, was paroled on February 11, 2000.

== Execution ==
Shaw was executed by electrocution on January 11, 1985, at the Central Correctional Institution in Columbia, South Carolina, at the age of 29. His last meal was pizza and tossed salad. In his final statement he thanked his family, religious counselors, and lawyers, and apologized to his victims' families. Roach was executed the following year, also by electrocution.

== See also ==
- Capital punishment in South Carolina
- Capital punishment in the United States
- List of people executed in South Carolina
- List of people executed in the United States in 1985

Executions carried out in South Carolina
Preceded by Douglas Thorne April 20, 1962	Joseph Carl Shaw; January 11, 1985	Succeeded by James Terry Roach January 10, 1986
Executions carried out in the United States
Preceded by Roosevelt Green – Georgia January 9, 1985	Joseph Carl Shaw – South Carolina; January 11, 1985	Succeeded by Doyle Skillern – Texas January 16, 1985
