= The Gray Man (ghost) =

Paranormal apparition

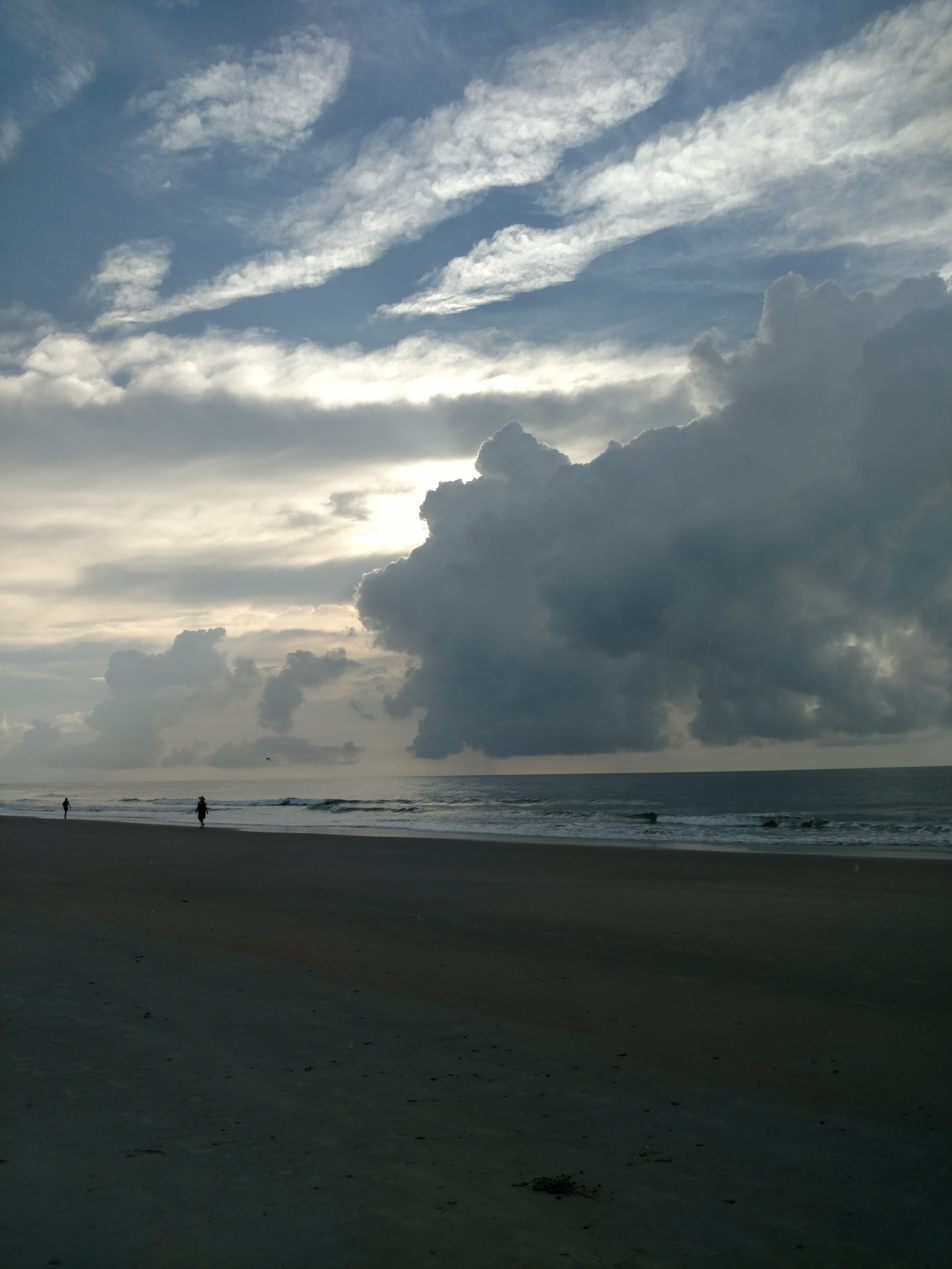
- Clouds over Pawleys Island beach

Creature information
- Grouping: Ghost

Origin
- First attested: 1822
- Country: United States
- Region: Pawleys Island, South Carolina

In South Carolina ghostlore, the Gray Man is a ghost reportedly seen on the coast of Pawleys Island, South Carolina, that warns residents of coming severe storms and hurricanes. Although there are many variations of the legend, most say the Gray Man was first seen in 1822, three years before the town government was incorporated. The last reported sighting was just before Hurricane Florence hit in 2018 and previously just before Hurricane Hugo hit the area in 1989.

== History and legend ==
Legend holds that the Gray Man is the ghost of a young man traveling from Charleston to see his fiancée in 1822. On the way, he and his horse were caught in quicksand-like pluff mud in the marshes before Pawley's Island, and died. His spirit has haunted the shore nearby ever since, looking for the girl he loved.

The legend appears to have first entered print in Julian Stevenson Bolick's book Waccamaw Plantations, published in 1946, and was repeated more elaborately in his 1956 book of ghost stories.

The Gray Man received national attention just after Hurricane Hugo when residents Jim and Clara Moore were interviewed on the television show Unsolved Mysteries, which aired in 1990. They told their story about seeing the man on the beach and how he disappeared when they waved. Their house was spared in the storm while the homes of their neighbors were heavily damaged.

The Weather Channel aired a series in 2014, American Super/Natural, that devoted an entire episode to the Gray Man.

People who have allegedly encountered the spirit have credited him with saving them or their homes. Either they have come ashore or left the area and returned to find their homes and belongings unscathed by severe storms. He has been described as a man wearing gray clothing, a long coat, dressed "like a pirate," and sometimes as having no legs.

== See also ==
- Apparitional experience
