= Listed buildings in Sowerby, North Yorkshire =

Sowerby is a civil parish in the county of North Yorkshire, England. It contains 32 listed buildings that are recorded in the National Heritage List for England. Of these, one is listed at Grade II*, the middle of the three grades, and the others are at Grade II, the lowest grade. The parish contains the village of Sowerby, immediately to the south of the market town of Thirsk, and the countryside to its south. Most of the listed buildings are houses, cottages and associated structures, and the others include a church and associated structures, two bridges, a public house, farmhouses and farm buildings, and a milepost.

== Key ==
Grade	Criteria
II*	Particularly important buildings of more than special interest
II	Buildings of national importance and special interest

== Buildings ==
Name and location	Photograph	Date	Notes	Grade
St Oswald's Church; 54.22625°N 1.34019°W		12th century	The church has been altered and extended through the centuries. It is in sandstone with a stone slate roof, and has a cruciform plan. It consists of a nave, a north aisle, north and south transepts, a chancel, a north vestry, and a west tower. The tower has three stages, stepped buttresses, a round-headed lancet window with a hood mould on the west side, a clock face in the middle stage, two-light bell openings, and an embattled parapet. On the crossing is a wooden lantern. The south doorway is Norman, with a round arch, two orders of colonnettes, scalloped capitals, and zigzag and beakhead decoration.	II*
124–130 Front Street; 54.22399°N 1.33907°W	—	16th century (possible)	A row of four cottages with a timber framed core, later encased in red brick and partly rendered. There is a continuous pantile roof and two storeys. Each cottage has a single bay and a doorway, and the windows are modern.	II
136a Front Street; 54.22371°N 1.33882°W		16th century (possible)	The cottage is timber framed, the ground floor is roughcast, there is close studding on the upper floor, and a pantile roof. The sides and rear are encased in reddish-brown brick. There are two storeys, three bays, and a rear outshut. The door and windows are modern.	II
Dovecote, Manor Farm; 54.22556°N 1.33827°W		17th century	The dovecote is in reddish brown brick, with moulded bands, dentilled eaves, and a hipped pantile roof. On the north front is a blocked doorway with pilasters, and on the south side is a later doorway.	II
Town End Bridge; 54.21981°N 1.33388°W		1672	A footbridge over Cod Beck, it is in stone. The bridge consists of a single segmental arch with a span of 10 yards (9.1 m) and a width of just over 5 feet (1.5 m).	II
2 Chapel Street; 54.23125°N 1.34363°W	—	18th century	A house, later used for other purposes, in reddish-brown brick, partly rendered, with dentilled eaves, and a pantile roof with stone verges and kneelers. There are two storeys, three bays and a single-storey wing on the right. The doorway has a wooden architrave, the windows are sashes in architraves with flat gauged brick arches, and on the wing is a bay window.	II
27 Front Street; 54.22507°N 1.33923°W	—	18th century	A house, later divided, in pinkish-brown brick, with an eaves cornice, and a pantile roof with raised stone verges and flat kneelers. There are two storeys and five bays, and a single storey canted bay on the left. On the front is a porch with Roman Doric columns and pilasters, and a modillion cornice. The windows are sashes with stucco heads.	II
86 and 88 Front Street; 54.22541°N 1.34021°W	—	18th century	A pair of cottages in pinkish-brown brick, with a string course, dentilled eaves and a slate roof. There are two storeys and three bays. The right house has two bays, a central doorway with a bracketed hood flanked by canted bay windows. The left house has one bay and a plain doorway, and the other windows in both houses are horizontally sliding sashes.	II
90 and 90a Front Street; 54.22528°N 1.34014°W	—	18th century	A house later divided into two, in reddish-brown brick, with string courses, a dentilled eaves cornice and a pantile roof. There are two storeys and four bays. The doorway in the second bay has reeded pilasters, a radial fanlight and a flat hood on brackets. To its right is a two-storey segmental bow window, and further to the right is a later doorway with a triangular pediment. The other windows are sashes with moulded surrounds and flat red brick arches, and at the rear is a stair window with Gothic glazing.	II
96 Front Street; 54.22496°N 1.33993°W	—	18th century	The house was later extended to the left. It is in brown brick with pantile roofs, the left roof with raised stone verges and kneelers. Both parts have two storeys, and the left part is higher. The earlier part on the right has three bays, a string course, dentilled eaves, a blocked central doorway, and sash windows in moulded surrounds. The left part has a doorway in the right bay with reeded pilasters, an entablature, a radial fanlight and a triangular open pediment. The windows are sashes in flush surrounds.	II
140 Front Street; 54.22343°N 1.33851°W	—	18th century	The house is in brick with a pantile roof. There are three storeys and three bays, and a recessed lower wing on the left. On the ground floor are canted bay windows, the upper floors contain sash windows, and the entrance is in the wing.	II
146 and 148 Front Street; 54.22317°N 1.33828°W	—	18th century	A pair of houses in reddish-brown brick with a tile roof. There are three storeys and four bays. The doorways have reeded pilasters, an entablature, a rectangular fanlight and a dentilled cornice. The windows are sashes with splayed stucco heads.	II
Crown and Anchor Public House; 54.22349°N 1.33859°W		18th century	The public house is in brown brick with a string course, a stepped eaves cornice and a pantile roof. There are two storeys and two bays. The doorway is in the centre, and the windows are sashes with splayed channelled stucco flat arches.	II
Lansbury House; 54.22583°N 1.34061°W	—	18th century	The house is in pinkish-brown brick, and it has a slate roof with raised stone verges and kneelers. There are two storeys and two bays. The doorway is in the left bay, and the windows are sashes.	II
North Farm House; 54.20705°N 1.32319°W		18th century	The farmhouse is in reddish-brown brick with a pantile roof. There are two storeys and three bays. On the front is a doorway and sash windows, and there is a dormer.	II
Former stable block and dovecote, The Three Tuns Hotel; 54.23186°N 1.34101°W		18th century	The building, at one time in business use and later converted into residential accommodation, is in reddish-brown brick with stone bands, an eaves cornice, and dentilled eaves. The left part, the former dovecote, is gabled, it has three storeys, a carriage entrance, and a Diocletian window in the top storey. To the right is a two-storey three-bay wing with a central doorway. The entrances have rusticated surrounds, and all the openings have keystones.	II
Blakey Bridge; 54.22432°N 1.33419°W		Late 18th century	The bridge carries Blakey Lane over Cod Beck. It is in limestone, and consists of two unequal segmental arches, each carrying a carriageway, the eastern arch larger. The parapets are plain, they splay with approach ramps, and end in simple drums.	II
Threshing Barn and gin gang, Manor Farm; 54.22553°N 1.33787°W		Late 18th century	The barn is in reddish-brown brick with a stepped eaves cornice and a pantile roof. On each side is a wagon door in a porch. The gin gang has a polygonal plan, and is attached to the west side.	II
98 Front Street; 54.22483°N 1.33984°W	—	Late 18th or early 19th century	The house is in brown brick with string courses, dentilled eaves, and a slate roof with raised stone verges and large kneelers. There are three storeys and three bays. The doorway has a moulded architrave, a rectangular fanlight, and a cornice on console brackets. The windows are sashes, those in the top floor horizontally sliding.	II
Thorpefield Farmhouse; 54.20889°N 1.35849°W	—	c. 1820	The farmhouse is in brown brick with a wooden eaves cornice and a slate roof. There are two storeys and three bays. The doorway has reeded pilasters, a radial fanlight and a flat hood. The windows are sashes with stucco heads and sills, and at the rear is a round-arched stair window.	II
33 Front Street; 54.22480°N 1.33898°W	—	Early 19th century	The house is in pinkish-brown brick, with quoins, floor bands, a dentiled eaves cornice, and a double gabled slate roof with raised verges and large kneelers. There are three storeys, a double depth plan and three bays. In the centre is a Roman Doric porch, flanked by canted bay windows. The windows are sashes with splayed stucco heads and keystones.	II
47–51 Front Street; 54.22446°N 1.33864°W	—	Early 19th century	A terrace of three houses in brown brick, with a modillion eaves cornice and a slate roof. There are two storeys and basements, and each house has two bays. Steps lead up to the doorways that have columns, an entablature a rectangular fanlight and a hood. The windows are sashes with channelled stucco heads.	II
68 Front Street; 54.22609°N 1.34080°W	—	Early 19th century	The house is in pinkish-brown brick on a stone plinth, with a modillion eaves cornice and a slate roof. There are two storeys and two bays, and a narrow round-arched passageway on the left. The doorway in the left bay has columns and a rectangular fanlight, and the windows are sashes with shallow segmental-arches and channelled stucco heads.	II
71 Front Street; 54.22290°N 1.33740°W	—	Early 19th century	The house is in rendered and whitewashed brick, with horizontal channelling on the ground floor, a cornice and quoins above, a modillion eaves cornice and a slate roof. There are three storeys and four bays. Steps lead up to the doorway with reeded pilasters, an entablature, a radial fanlight, and a dentilled triangular pediment. To its left is a bowed oriel window, and the other windows are sashes, those in the lower two floors with moulded surrounds.	II
142 and 144 Front Street; 54.22332°N 1.33835°W	—	Early 19th century	A pair of houses in pinkish-brown brick, with a wooden eaves cornice and a slate roof. There are two storeys, the left house has three bays, and the right house has two. Both houses have doorways with reeded pilasters and an open dentilled pediment, the left house has a semicircular fanlight, and the right fanlight is rectangular. On the ground floor are three canted bay windows with a modillion cornice, and a passage door, and the upper floor contains sash windows.	II
172 Front Street; 54.22230°N 1.33766°W	—	Early 19th century	The house is in reddish-brown brick with a pantile roof. There are two storeys and three bays. The central doorway has pilasters and a flat hood. To its right is a canted bay window, and the other windows are sashes with shallow segmental-arched heads.	II
The Manor House; 54.22597°N 1.33836°W		Early 19th century	The house is in brown brick, with a sill band and a hipped stone slate roof. There are two storeys and three bays. The central doorway has an oblong fanlight and a hood on brackets. The windows are sashes, those on the ground floor in architraves, and those on the upper floor are recessed. All the ground floor openings are in round-arched recesses.	II
Middle Farmhouse; 54.20506°N 1.32395°W	—	Early to mid-19th century	The farmhouse is in brown brick with a pantile roof. There are two storeys and two bays. The central doorway has a plain surround and a rectangular fanlight. The windows are sashes; those in the ground floor are tripartite with shallow segmental brick arches.	II
Court House, Inspector's House, wall and gate 54.23084°N 1.34501°W		c. 1840	The house is in brick with stone dressings and a shallow hipped slate roof. There are two storeys and three bays. It has a central round-headed doorway and sash windows. The court house was added to the right in 1885–86, and is joined to the house by a link containing a doorway. The court house is in stone with a slate roof. On the front are windows flanked by Doric pilasters, above which is an entablature, and a pediment containing a circular window. In front of the buildings is a low brick wall with stone coping and a gate.	II
Wall south of 172 Front Street; 54.22223°N 1.33743°W	—	19th century	The garden wall is in reddish-brown brick with flat stone coping. It has a quadrant north section.	II
Milepost; 54.21748°N 1.35360°W		Mid-19th century	The milepost is on the northwest side of Topcliffe Road (B1448 road). It is in cast iron, and has a triangular plan and a sloping upper face. On the upper face is inscribed "NR Y CC". On the left face is the distance to Thirsk, and on the right face the distance to Boroughbridge.	II
Churchyard walls, pier and overthrows, St Oswald's Church; 54.22625°N 1.34055°W		19th century	The churchyard wall is in reddish-brown brick with stone coping. There are two entrances from the street, each with brick piers and a wrought iron overthrow incorporating a lantern.	II
