= List of Hetalia: Axis Powers episodes =

Hetalia: Axis Powers DVD volume 1 Limited edition cover

An anime adaptation of Hetalia: Axis Powers was announced on July 24, 2008. It is directed by Bob Shirohata (Gravitation, Diamond Daydreams) and is animated by Studio Deen. It was originally scheduled for broadcast on Kids Station on January 24, 2009, but was later canceled. The cancellation only affected the Kids Stations broadcast; plans to make the series available through mobile phone and Internet streaming were not affected. Controversies arose when numerous Korean protesters called for the cancellation of the series, claiming that the personification of the character Korea was an insulting representation of Koreans, despite there being no plans to include the character. Kids Station claimed that the Korea character does not appear in the anime and that it was "unaware of the criticism in Korea," and cited "various circumstances" as being behind the decision to cancel its airing of the anime, but they did not provide further information as to the nature of these circumstances. The character for Korea can still be seen in the ending of the anime while all of the countries are rotating around the world.

A second 26-episode season of Hetalia: Axis Powers was announced on April 16, 2009, and a third was announced on December 10, 2009. For the third and fourth seasons of the anime, the title was changed to Hetalia: World Series. The fifth season, Hetalia: A Beautiful World, was announced in Gentosha's September 2012 issue. As of the 1st of April, a sixth season had been confirmed. This season was called "The World Twinkle," and aired in 2015. Episodes are available on mobile phone and Internet streaming for a period of eight days each; the Internet streaming period begins three days after the episode is first available on mobile phone. Dates given are the first day an episode is available on mobile phone. An original net anime (ONA) adaptation of the Hetalia: World Stars side story manga was announced in October 2020. It premiered on April 1, 2021.

== Episode list ==
=== Season 1 (Axis Powers Season 1) ===
No.	Title	Original release date
1	"Episode 01"	January 24, 2009
When the nations gather to solve the world's problems, America presents his solution to global warming. Then everyone argues for a while, followed by a flashback to WWI.
2	"Episode 02"	January 30, 2009
Germany is prowling the woods of WWI in search of the enemy when he happens upon a crate of tomatoes. Inside the crate, he discovers a panicking Italy pleading for his life.
3	"Episode 03"	February 6, 2009
WWI is over, but Italy won't quit pestering Germany. With WWII right around the corner, Italy ends up pledging his undying devotion to Germany.
4	"Episode 04"	February 13, 2009
Italy and Germany have a new ally: Japan. After a "getting acquainted" soak in the hot springs, Japan shows the guys his value as an ally. He doesn't really do much yet, but is very polite.
5	"Episode 05: Crying out S.O.S at the Center of the World!"; Transliteration: "Sekai no chūshin de esuōesu o sakebu" (Japanese: 世界の中心でSOSを叫ぶ)	February 20, 2009
Germany, Japan, and Italy are on a deserted island, making the most of such a pleasant environment. Carefree Italy spends his free time making white flags and sand sculptures of pasta, while Japan and Germany discuss plans for war.
6	"Episode 06"	February 27, 2009
Japan, Germany, and Italy roast marshmallows on the beach. The three nations may feel like the night belongs to them, but they are far from alone.
7	"Episode 07"	March 6, 2009
America takes a break from eating hamburgers to reveal his plans for attacking the Axis. Meanwhile, Italy introduces his brother Romano to Germany.
8	"Episode 08"	March 13, 2009
Since Italy's kind of a moron, he keeps getting captured by the Allies. But because he's kind of annoying, he keeps getting sent back to the Axis. And in a shocking turn of events, Japan answers a telephone!
9	"Episode 09"	March 20, 2009
The Allies get together to split up their responsibilities for the coming war, which really just means that America decides he'll be the hero and everyone else will act as his support. Meanwhile, isn't France dreamy?
10	"Episode 10"	March 27, 2009
After he winds up uninvited to the second Allies meeting, France reflects on his history of past "glories" and "accomplishments".
11	"Episode 11"	April 3, 2009
In the climax to the Chibitalia sub-plot, Holy Roman Empire gives the younger Italy the ultimatum: Will he become the new Roman Empire with him or not? Later on, in 1940, England finds that he still has friends outside of the Allies to count on to cheer him up...
12	"Episode 12"	April 10, 2009
In a brief jump forward to 1956, a gloomy and war-torn France proposes to England. Back in 1940, the Axis Powers train to take on England, and Italy gets a quick and confusing lesson in "culture clash".
13	"Episode 13"	April 17, 2009
After being defeated by Germany, a frustrated England vows to get revenge with the strongest method known to man: summoning the devil to lay a curse on him. But it fails, and he ends up with someone even worse: Russia.
14	"Episode 14"	April 24, 2009
The Germans' attempt at training the Italian Army doesn't go as planned, as they soon find that the men are much more talented at the art of escape rather than combat. Later: It's just another day in the life of Germany, as he attempts to brave the wait and chaos in a never-ending line at the supermarket.
15	"Episode 15"	May 1, 2009
Japan struggles to fit in with the Axis and their strange foreign culture and behaviors, while Italy attempts to help him adjust to life outside of his own land.
16	"Episode 16"	May 8, 2009
In a tale of times past, a younger China meets a strange small nation known as Japan. He takes it upon himself to try to raise Japan as his younger brother, but soon discovers that there's more to the growing youngster than he thought. And he may not be prepared to deal with the sudden changes...
17	"Episode 17: America's Cleaning Of The Storage, Part 1"	May 15, 2009
America decides to finally enter his long-abandoned storage room to clean it out, but the memories he finds in there may prove to be too hard to let go of.
18	"Episode 18"	May 22, 2009
The Allied Forces make their move and attempt to take down the Axis, but wind up constantly distracted by a "special guest" on the island, a stranger that Italy seems to know rather well.
19	"Episode 19"	May 29, 2009
The Allied Forces attempt to get back to business, despite China arriving late for their meeting. But little do they know, they have a surprise guest (or two) in their room, listening in on their "top secret" plans.
20	"Episode 20: America's Cleaning Of The Storage, Part 2"	June 5, 2009
Germany attempts to teach Italy how to throw a grenade, England focuses the wisdom of the British Empire on making new, cutting-edge cooking appliances, and the old musket in America's storage room brings back another memory of times long past: the Revolutionary War.
21	"Episode 21"	June 12, 2009
Sealand, a so-called micronation, attends a world conference in an attempt to be recognized, but finds that respect and acknowledgment from the others is harder to obtain than he thinks.
22	"Episode 22"	June 19, 2009
Holy Roman Empire gets ready to depart for war, but Chibitalia won't let him leave that easily, and not without one last gift.
23	"Episode 23"	June 26, 2009
Liechtenstein adjusts to her new life with her brother Switzerland. Elsewhere, Italy gets stuck in an embarrassing situation with his own brother.
24	"Episode 24"	July 3, 2009
While out shopping, Switzerland and Liechtenstein run into Austria, much to Switzerland's displeasure. Meanwhile, the Axis Powers are still deserted on an island, but come across a most unusual sight in the middle of a forest.
25	"Episode 25"	July 10, 2009
In tale of the past, England raises the young America and treats him to his own "special" brand of cooking. Meanwhile, as the "Liechtenstein and Her Beloved Brother" arc comes to a close, Switzerland finds himself reminded of his lapsed friendship with Austria.
26	"Episode 26"	July 17, 2009
America unveils a new plane, much to England's chagrin, and lets out a secret. Later, England attempts to use Busby's Chair to get revenge on America during a summit of the Allies, only for Russia to sit on the chair first and destroy it by out-evilling it. England reveals his drunk side when in a bar with America (who England is trying to coax information out of). Then Episode 18 is continued, with England attempting to use Busby's Chair once the Axis are surrounded, although Russia sits on it yet again...

=== Season 2 (Axis Powers Season 2) ===
No.	Title	Original release date
27	"Episode 27"	July 24, 2009
The Allied Forces, in their ongoing fight against the Axis Powers, manage to get a hold of one of Germany's prized possessions: an observation diary dealing with Italy's strange behavior, uselessness in combat, and a secret that he would never tell anyone about.
28	"Episode 28: :) In The World"	July 31, 2009
The Axis are ambushed by the Allies once more, but another strange visitor arrives to break up the fight, with Christmas presents in tow.
29	"Episode 29"	August 7, 2009
Russia decides to jump out of a plane without a parachute, and England and France comment on how he broke all his bones. Then, the audience is introduced to the Baltics, although Latvia has a tendency to say the wrong thing at times. After that, America injures himself when England offers him some ice cream.
30	"Episode 30: The Ghost Culture Of England And Japan"	August 14, 2009
After having formed an alliance, England visits Japan's home but finds mysterious creatures that even Japan himself is unable to see or believe in anymore.
31	"Episode 31: Academy Hetalia Christmas"	August 21, 2009
In a universe similar yet different from this one, three students at the World Academy W decide to survey the others on how they spend their winter holiday.
32	"Episode 32: With Grandpa Rome"	August 28, 2009
Germany wakes up to find himself visited by Italy's grandfather, the Roman Empire. But didn't he fall long ago? And is it a dream, or something stranger?
33	"Episode 33"	September 4, 2009
While camping out in the middle of a war front, Germany and Italy both make wishes on a shooting star, but which one will come true?
34	"Episode 34"	September 11, 2009
Adapts more of Hello World, Hello Italy! Italy shows Japan his combat recordbook (which turns out to be impressive in a different way), while Germany decides to go sightseeing in Italy and attempts to blend in. The Axis are given special bentou, and Japan invents nikujaga. In another story, America ponders the mystery of who draws the sketches of the Axis and Allies on the blackboard...
35	"Episode 35"	September 18, 2009
Canada arrives late to a G8 meeting, but his absence and identity are barely recognized by the other nations. In another story, France decides to resurrect the Olympics.
36	"Episode 36: Why Americans Love Spring"	September 25, 2009
America and Japan both prepare for the New Year and the coming of spring.
37	"Episode 37"	October 2, 2009
Russia and Germany form an alliance, while Italy fears that the other Axis Powers will eventually abandon him.
38	"Episode 38"	October 9, 2009
Continuation of The Pact Of Steel, along with more of Fly, Canada-san, Fly! Italy and Germany pinkie swear to be best friends forever. In another story, Sealand tries to sneak into a G8 meeting by disguising himself as Canada.
39	"Episode 39: The Battle For America, Part 1"	October 16, 2009
Adapts part of The Battle for America. A baby America is discovered in the "New World", though this discovery also sets off a fight for ownership from France and England for him.
40	"Episode 40: The Battle For America, Part 2"	October 23, 2009
Continuation of The Battle For America. England and France continue their fight over the young America.
41	"Episode 41"	October 30, 2009
Adapts Big Brother France And The Information Manipulation Activities! and Reduce Your Opponents' Willpower, American-style! France and England decide to start some rumours about Germany, while America comes up with a strategy to weaken Japan's morale.
42	"Episode 42"	November 6, 2009
Russia talks about his two sisters, Ukraine and Belarus.
43	"Episode 43"	November 13, 2009
Continuation of Russia's Big And Little Sisters. Russia talks about his past as the Soviet Union and tries to make new friends. This includes sending a letter to France's radio talk show and receiving some questionable advice from him in response.
44	"Episode 44"	November 20, 2009
Switzerland tries to teach Liechtenstein self-defense. In other segments: Japan finds America's strange desserts photograph-worthy, while Canada (in more of Fly, Canada-san, Fly!) unsuccessfully tries to tell America off.
45	"Episode 45"	November 27, 2009
Liechtenstein's origin is detailed.
46	"Episode 46: Medieval England's Clothes And Hair"	December 4, 2009
England is a perpetual bed-head, and we return to the past to remember a time when France was at his most flamboyant and mischievous - teasing England by showing off his long hair, and then cutting England's hair when his own plan to grow his hair long doesn't go according to plan.
47	"Episode 47"	December 11, 2009
England and France visit Poland, who has recently bought a fleet of ponies to help him in the war. In other stories: Chibitalia feels sad over the departure of Holy Roman Empire, while England finds that America grows up too fast.
48	"Episode 48"	December 18, 2009
England's latest secret weapon to win the war is a failure. In another story, Chibitalia finally grows up, but one change is a shock to Austria.
49	"Episode 49"	December 25, 2009
Adapts Japan And The Footsteps Of Westernization, along with a segment from Fly, Canada-san, Fly! Japan is introduced to Western culture, and Canada tries to stand out from his brother more.
50	"Episode 50"	January 8, 2010
Continuation of Japan And The Footsteps Of Westernization. America tries to trick Japan into believing he's invented a fortune-telling table, and Japan reveals he's worried about his ability to get along with all the new countries whose culture he's being introduced to.
51	"Episode 51"	February 26, 2010
Adapts America's Situation With Ghosts. America wants Japan to watch a scary movie with him. Japan wonders why America watches it if it scares him so much, and gives America some horror video games so he gets more used to scary things.
52	"Episode 52"	March 5, 2010
Adapts more of Fly, Canada-san, Fly! and Holy Roman Empire's Playtime In The River. England mistakes Canada for America and gets into a fight with France. Later, Canada makes friends with Cuba. In another story, Holy Roman Empire has a dream about him and Chibitalia swimming together in a river.

=== Season 3 (World Series Season 1) ===
No.	Title	Original release date
53	"Episode 53"	March 26, 2010
Features the story of Prussia, when he was a child as the Teutonic Knights. In other stories: Romano attempts yet again to stop Germany from being with his younger brother, while Canada and America play a game of "catch" that quickly gets out of hand.
54	"Episode 54"	April 2, 2010
Greece and Japan get to know each other more. In another story, Chibitalia and Holy Roman Empire celebrate the Cat Festival.
55	"Episode 55"	April 9, 2010
The continuation of Greece and Japan's story, featuring the first anime appearance of Turkey.
56	"Episode 56"	April 16, 2010
Adapts France vs. Italy and part of The Pact of Steel. Italy tries and fails to get back the paintings France took from him. In another story, Lithuania overhears Russia talking about invading Poland, and calls Poland to warn him. Poland doesn't seem too bothered about it.
57	"Episode 57"	April 23, 2010
The continuation of Poland and Lithuania's story, plus part of England Catches A Cold.
58	"Episode 58"	April 30, 2010
Continues England catches A Cold. In another story: China is tired of being pushed around by the other Allies.
59	"Episode 59"	May 7, 2010
Hungary hears a message from God telling her to hit France with a frying pan. In other stories: England attempts to become stronger, and Italy visits France.
60	"Episode 60"	May 14, 2010
Adapts Boss Spain's Control of Southern Italy. Austria grants Spain sovereignty over Northern Italy/Romano. In another story, Germany details another observation diary about Italy, while a glimpse at the relationship of their ancestors Germania and Rome is provided.
61	"Episode 61"	May 21, 2010
Continues Boss Spain's Control of Southern Italy. Spain tries and fails to teach Romano Spanish and goes to Austria's house to ask to trade him for Veneziano. In other stories: Rome and Germania have another conversation, and Japan discovers that Italy is a reckless driver.
62	"Episode 62"	May 28, 2010
Adapts In Just Two Minutes, You Can Grasp the Exterior of the European Economy, as well as more of Boss Spain's Control of Southern Italy. France tries to instate a new bank after a talk with Switzerland, but it doesn't exactly go as planned. In another story, Spain gives the Italy brothers tomatoes.
63	"Episode 63"	June 4, 2010
China gets help from Japan on bootlegging, while the Italy brothers wind up captured by England, and Germany learns that the Italian behavior is infectious as Japan visits Italy for sightseeing.
64	"Episode 64"	June 11, 2010
The War of Austrian Succession. Maria Theresa is crowned as the new Archduchess of Austria and Queen of Hungary, which Prussia isn't too happy about.
65	"Episode 65"	June 18, 2010
The second part of the War of Austrian Succession. Prussia beats Austria, so Maria Theresa calls in Hungary for reinforcement.
66	"Episode 66"	June 25, 2010
In a flashback, Germany introduces Italy and Japan. America mistakes a weather balloon for a UFO, and meets Tony the alien.
67	"Episode 67"	July 2, 2010
Continues Boss Spain's Control of Southern Italy. Chibi Romano decides to travel home for three days, but Boss Spain is worried, so he follows him, only to find someone else showing interest. In other stories, more fun with Holy Roman Empire and Chibitalia.
68	"Episode 68"	July 9, 2010
Continues Boss Spain's Control of Southern Italy. Spain tries to stop France from taking Romano. Romano notices this and runs off, thinking about the differences between him and Veneziano. In another story, Japan and Greece try to get angry.
69	"Episode 69"	July 16, 2010
Japan and Greece continue trying to get angry. Finland and Sweden are living together on the road.
70	"Episode 70"	July 23, 2010
Finland and Sweden visit Poland, and also run into Estonia and Latvia, to Finland's delight. Sweden wants to take Latvia and Estonia, which Poland isn't too happy about.
71	"Episode 71"	July 30, 2010
Italy gives Germany a rather unusual Christmas present, and America throws a Christmas party. Also, Italy makes friendship posters for Germany.
72	"Episode 72"	August 6, 2010
Italy is worried that Germany doesn't like him. However, on his way to talk to Germany about his concerns, he accidentally stumbles into Switzerland's territory, which Switzerland isn't too pleased about. In another story, America invites Japan to next year's Christmas party.
73	"Episode 73"	August 13, 2010
England goes in search of friends, and while he hits it off well with Japan, Japan's boss has other plans.
74	"Episode 74"	August 20, 2010
The Anglo-Japanese Alliance story continues. England and Japan form an alliance, and England tries to teach Japan English.
75	"Episode 75"	August 27, 2010
Continues Boss Spain's Control of Southern Italy. Romano is confronted by a mysterious masked man wielding a sword (Turkey). In the story of The Austrian Anschluss, Austria winds up having to live with Germany.
76	"Episode 76"	September 3, 2010
Continues Boss Spain's Control of Southern Italy. Spain sets out to rescue Romano from Turkey.

=== Season 4 (World Series Season 2) ===
No.	Title	Original release date
77	"Episode 77"	September 10, 2010
Finishes Boss Spain's Control of Southern Italy. Spain's boss scolds him for spending all their money to save Romano, and Romano thanks Spain for helping him. Later, during WW2, while the Italy brothers are captured, Romano makes a phone call to Spain and demands that he help him out, but Spain doesn't have enough money to do so.
78	"Episode 78"	September 17, 2010
Adapts Salted Salmon, Germany, and I and If the World was Made Up of Cats... Japan complains about how he feels run down, and Germany tells him to lay off the salt and changes his diet and exercise regime. Also, Nekotalia is introduced.
79	"Episode 79"	September 24, 2010
Continues Salted Salmon, Germany, and I. Prussia tries to get Germany to drink beer with him, but Germany is sticking to the same diet plan he's making Japan follow. In another story, the Nordics produce a doll.
80	"Episode 80"	October 1, 2010
Finishes Salted Salmon, Germany, and I. Italy tries to make Japan and Germany re-consider their dietary decisions, which they eventually do.
81	"Episode 81"	October 8, 2010
Austria and Germany argue over whether Beethoven is an Austrian or a German. Meanwhile, France spies on both of them and is then caught taking pictures of Austria at England's request.
82	"Episode 82"	October 15, 2010
England discusses the G8. Meanwhile, Finland tells Sweden about his time with Russia. Also, another Nekotalia story about the tuna crisis with the cat clan.
83	"Episode 83"	October 22, 2010
China goes back to his homeland and brings some souvenirs to the Emperor. Meanwhile in Nekotalia, Russicat tries to separate Romanoneko and Itaneko while Germouser wakes Caustria.
84	"Episode 84"	November 2, 2010
Adapts Can't Escape from Italy. Romano and Italy lock England up and argue over who will keep watch over him, not noticing his escape. Meanwhile, Sealand searches for someone to join forces with.
85	"Episode 85"	November 8, 2010
Continues Can't Escape from Italy. England escapes once again after being caught by Germany. In order not to get caught easily, England disguises himself as a "handsome" Italian. Meanwhile, France talks to himself about how the world is going to end soon.
86	"Episode 86"	November 15, 2010
Concludes Can't Escape from Italy. Germany explains to England how he spotted him, not noticing England escape while he talks. He ends up being rescued by America.
87	"Episode 87"	November 22, 2010
Germany and Italy spy on a British military camp. Later, they find that they've once more become shipwrecked on a mysterious island.
88	"Episode 88"	November 29, 2010
Chibitalia puts a ban on boats in the Venice canal. In other stories: Switzerland turns out to be a lot different than Japan had thought, and the Italy brothers run out of pasta.
89	"Episode 89"	December 6, 2010
The audience learns a bit more about the art of punchlines. Meanwhile, in the distant past, a young Lithuania meets a mysterious little boy...
90	"Episode 90"	December 13, 2010
Prussia finds a wounded Hungary in a bush and attempts to help her.
91	"Episode 91"	December 20, 2010
Hungary wonders whether it's time for her to start acting meek, and moves in with Austria. In another story, Italy modified Germany's Kubelwagen without permission again.
92	"Episode 92"	December 27, 2010
A young Lithuania learns about his neighbors from Hungary. America wants a convenience store like Japan unlike all the delis in his home. Spain and Romano are visited by a large number of baby sea turtles.
93	"Episode 93"	January 3, 2011
11th century England plans to steal France's fashion styles and make them better in an attempt to piss him off.
94	"Episode 94"	January 10, 2011
Spain fights with France over Chibi Romano. Belgium and Netherlands come to visit them.
95	"Episode 95"	January 17, 2011
In the 15th century, the King of Lithuania gets married and the country forms an alliance with Poland.
96	"Episode 96"	January 24, 2011
Poland and Lithuania share interesting stories about their capital cities.
97	"Episode 97"	January 31, 2011
After intercepting a message, the Allies travel to a beach to meet up with the Axis Powers. However, America and China get separated from the others and have to survive on their own. Also, Poland and Lithuania play chess.
98	"Episode 98"	February 7, 2011
America goes to Japan to become friends with him and do some whaling.
99	"Episode 99"	February 14, 2011
America continues on his mission to get Japan to open up, and England offers to be America's friend.
100	"Episode 100"	February 21, 2011
France believes to be stranded alone on an island, but it turns out Italy, England, Russia nad Germany are also present, and the island is Seychelles. During WW1, Germany and England play a football match.
-	"Extra Episode 1"	February 21, 2011
Iceland meets up with the rest of the Nordic states to reveal the results of test to find out who his ancestors were.
-	"Extra Episode 2"	February 21, 2011
The countries celebrate Halloween. Also, Italy and Germany reminisce about old times.
-	"Extra Episode 3"	February 21, 2011
China worries about the other nations of the world trying to invade his land and get his opium. America uses a 1942 notebook computer to calculate a route from America to Germany. Also features the adaption of "Previously in Hetalia".
53.5	"Episode 53.5: My Awesome Diary Part 2"; Transliteration: "Ore-sama nikki sono 2" (Japanese: おれさまにっき その2)	February 21, 2011
Austria and Hungary attend the Belgian cat festival. Chibi Hungary does not know that she's female (she thinks that the male genitalia grows in later). Prussia realizes this and tries to explain it to her, but she leaves before he has the chance.
-	"Extra Episode 5: Hetalia = Fantasia"; Transliteration: "Hetaria = Fantajia" (Japanese: ヘタリア = ファンタジア)	September 25, 2012
Based on the Hetalia drama Hetalia Fantasia starring the Axis Powers and the Allies as they play their online MMORPG.

=== Season 5 (Beautiful World series) ===
No.	Title	Original release date
101	"Each Battlefield"; Transliteration: "Sorezore no senjō" (Japanese: それぞれの戦場)	January 25, 2013
Japan explains the true nature of a ninja's shuriken. Wartime leaves the Axis with a lack of coffee, and Germany is assigned to come up with an alternative. Italy shows off his new tanks, which prove to be quite dangerous.
102	"Gakuen Hetalia: Go Forth! Newspaper Club!! First Half"; Transliteration: "Gakuen Hetaria: Susume! Shinbun-bu! Zenhansen" (Japanese: 学園ヘタリア 進め! 新聞部! 前半戦)	February 1, 2013
The newspaper club, which consists of Germany, Italy, and Japan, decide to interview all of the clubs in the school, including the choir club, the Soviet club, the hero club, the Gourmet club, and the magic club.
103	"Gakuen Hetalia: Go Forth! Newspaper Club!! Second Half"; Transliteration: "Gakuen Hetaria: Susume! Shinbun-bu! Kouhansen" (Japanese: 学園ヘタリア 進め! 新聞部! 後半戦)	February 8, 2013
The newspaper club goes on to interview the Nordic club, the Canada club, the elephant appreciation club, the music club, the swim team, and the... "Going Home" club?
104	"Russia and Friends"; Transliteration: "Roshia to otomodachi" (Japanese: ロシアとおともだち)	February 15, 2013
Little Russia is picked on by Mongolia, Denmark, and Sweden, is freaked out by Little Ukraine, is rejected by a hamster, and fights the Battle on the Ice against the Teutonic Order (Prussia).
105	"Though I May Depart, You Shall Remain"; Transliteration: "Watashi ga saro utomo anata wa nokoru" (Japanese: 私が去ろうとも貴方は残る)	February 22, 2013
After meeting France, a Parisian mortal ponders what it means to live forever.
106	"Romano's Diary"; Transliteration: "Romāno nikki" (Japanese: ロマーノにっき)	March 1, 2013
In which Chibi Romano is a cute tsundere who really does care for Spain (even though he has an odd way of showing it).
107	"Things that Often Happen When Rooming with an American"; Transliteration: "Amerika-jin to kurashiteru to yoku aru koto" (Japanese: アメリカ人と暮らしてるとよくあること)	March 8, 2013
Japan stays over at America's place for a while. Extreme culture-conflict ensues.
108	"The Gentle Fight Between Russia and I"; Transliteration: "Roshia san to boku no yuruyaka na kenka" (Japanese: ロシアさんと僕のゆるやかな喧嘩)	March 15, 2013
Estonia finds all his websites hacked with each site displaying a drawing of Chibi Russia. Immediately, Estonia accuses Russia of the dirty deed, but naturally Russia denies it. In order to solve the mystery, Estonia hires America to trace the hack.
109	"At Netherlands'"; Transliteration: "Oranda sanchi" (Japanese: オランダさんち)	March 22, 2013
The reason for Netherlands' obsessive concern about money is revealed.
110	"Turkey&!"; Transliteration: "Toruko to!" (Japanese: とること！)	March 29, 2013
Greece's philosophical side makes an appearance, and more is revealed about his strange relationship with Turkey. Meanwhile, Italy and Turkey discuss the times when Chibitalia used to beat up Turkey, much to the surprise and disbelief of Germany.
111	"Our Failure"; Transliteration: "Boku tachi no shippai" (Japanese: 僕たちの失敗)	April 5, 2013
All of the countries are threatened with "embarrassing" photos to come to an April Fool's gathering in even more embarrassing costumes.
112	"Merry Halloween!"; Transliteration: "Merī Harouīn!" (Japanese: めりーはろうぃーん！)	April 12, 2013
It's Halloween night, and America wants Japan to help him finally win a Halloween prank war against undefeated England.
113	"Finding Santa"; Transliteration: "Faindingu Santa" (Japanese: ふぁいんでぃんぐ・サンタ)	April 19, 2013
Santa's missing and Finland is in a crisis, so he pleads for the other nations to spread the holiday cheer this Christmas until Santa can be found.
114	"Brother, we are...!!" Transliteration: "Kyoudai yo! Oretachi wa…!!" (Japanese: 兄弟よ！俺たちは…！！)	May 10, 2013
The countries are rated by how fast they walk. Prussia and Germany are caught infiltrating an American military camp.
115	"A bientôt! Until We Meet Again!"; Transliteration: "A bientot! Mata aimashō" (Japanese: A bientot! また会いましょう)	May 17, 2013
France meets a girl and takes her on a tour. They discuss the Hundred Years War, Joan of Arc, and what she means to France.
116	"What Italy Forgot"; Transliteration: "Itaria no wasuremono" (Japanese: イタリアの忘れ物)	May 24, 2013
England tells Seychelles that the Prince of England and his wife are going to her place for their honeymoon, but she must keep it secret. In another story, Italy forgets his gun during WW1, which is later found by Germany.
117	"Hetalia of the Dead - First Part"; Transliteration: "HETALIA OF THE DEAD/Zenpen" (Japanese: HETALIA OF THE DEAD/前編)	May 31, 2013
The countries watch and discuss horror films from each of their countries.
118	"Hetalia of the Dead - Second Part"; Transliteration: "HETALIA OF THE DEAD/Kōhen" (Japanese: HETALIA OF THE DEAD/後編)	June 7, 2013
The countries watch more horror films, and realize that horror films from other countries are weird. India and New Zealand make an appearance.
119	"Keep on moving!! March Forward, Sealand!"; Transliteration: "Motto motto!! Susume Sīrando!" (Japanese: もっともっと!!進めシーランド！)	June 14, 2013
Sealand tries to make a new friend: the newest micronation, Wy.
120	"It's the First Anniversary! The Tripartite Pact"; Transliteration: "Isshuunen dayo! Sangoku dōmei" (Japanese: 一周年だよ!三国同盟)	June 21, 2013
The Axis Powers celebrate the first anniversary of the Tripartite Pact.

=== Season 6 (The World Twinkle series) ===
No.	Title	Original release date
121	"Nekotalia Once Again"; Transliteration: "Nekotaria matatabi" (Japanese: ねこたりあまたたび)	July 3, 2015
Shows a little more from the neko nations, such as France-cat's taste in his Parisian home, and introduces Spain-cat and Turkey-cat.
122	"Let's Eat Military Rations!"; Transliteration: "Mirimeshi o tabeyō!" (Japanese: ミリメシを食べよう！)	July 10, 2015
The Axis as well as England and America try to manufacture food that stays edible during war. England gets a little surprise during tea time.
123	"Meeting of the Nordic"	July 17, 2015
Iceland feels like there's something a bit off about today's Nordic meeting. Meanwhile, Estonia wants to join the Nordics.
124	"The Nordic Five +α" Transliteration: "Hokuou faibu +α" (Japanese: 北欧ファイブ+α)	July 24, 2015
A little bit of background information is given about the five Nordic states. Estonia is still trying to become a Nordic, much to the displeasure of the other two Baltics.
125	"The Life of the Great Man, the Awesome Me"; Transliteration: "Oresama ijin-den" (Japanese: 俺様偉人伝)	July 31, 2015
Prussia tells the tale of how countries that once made up the Holy Roman Empire became unified as one country. A brief summary is shown about the history of beer.
126	"African War Front! Part 1"; Transliteration: "Afurika Sensen! Sono 1" (Japanese: アフリカ戦線！その1)	August 7, 2015
Germany looks to book smarts to figure out how to deal with Italy. Italy travels to Africa, only to end up running away from England.
127	"African War Front! Part 2"; Transliteration: "Afurika Sensen! Sono 2" (Japanese: アフリカ戦線！その2)	August 14, 2015
America joins England on the African battlefront, much to England's displeasure.
128	"Nordics à la Carte"; Transliteration: "Hokuō Arakaruto" (Japanese: 北欧アラカルト)	August 21, 2015
In a past tale, Norway fights alongside Denmark in blizzard-like conditions to fight off Sweden's attacks. Denmark realizes how much of an effect he's had on his old friend, Norway.
129	"It's a Pandora Box of Countries! - First Part"; Transliteration: "Kuni no Tamatebako yaa! Zenpen" (Japanese: 国の玉手箱やぁ！前編)	August 28, 2015
Sealand, Wy, and Seborga go out to make some new friends with other micronations.
130	"It's a Pandora Box of Countries! - Second Part"; Transliteration: "Kuni no Tamatebako yaa! Kōhen" (Japanese: 国の玉手箱やぁ!後編)	September 4, 2015
Sealand, Wy, Seborga, and recently joined Molossia continue their search for micronation friends.
131	"Davie"	September 11, 2015
America, while still a young colony, meets a human boy named Davie. Davie shows him a beautiful flower in a book, which causes America to search far and wide for it. But in the end, America learns what it truly means to be immortal.
132	"Liberté, égalité, fraternité and…" Transliteration: "Jiyū byōdō hakuai soshite…" (Japanese: 自由・平等・博愛 そして…)	September 18, 2015
France takes a moment to remind the world of his beauty, only to be interrupted by Germany. France and England later bicker over how to deal with the Axis during a meeting of the Allies.
133	"Together with Russia"; Transliteration: "Roshia to issho" (Japanese: ロシアと一緒)	September 25, 2015
Russia ends up being late to a meeting of the Allies. He later visits his old friend, Lithuania. China gets a chance to see one of his old colonies, Hong Kong.
134	"Canada and His Neighbors"; Transliteration: "Kanada-san to otonari-san" (Japanese: カナダさんとお隣さん)	October 2, 2015
Canada thinks back to when he was a new colony, and when France fought for him, (as brief as it might have been). But, as always, he ends up being outshone by his twin. A little insight on Mexico's opinion of him is given.
135	"In those days, Chibi-chan was…" Transliteration: "Sono mukashi, Chibi-chan wa" (Japanese: その昔、ちびちゃんは)	October 2, 2015
Italy takes a little walk in the Vatican with Japan, thinking about times in old Italy. Italy and Germany do something together while in a military tent.

=== Season 7 (World Stars Series) ===
No.	Title	Original release date
136	"The Weirdos・Part 1"	April 1, 2021
Adapts "Chapter 1" from Hetalia: World☆Stars Volume 1, "Chapter 34" from Hetalia: World☆Stars Volume 2, and "Chapter 74" from Hetalia: World☆Stars Volume 3.
137	"The Weirdos・Part 2"	April 8, 2021
Adapts "Chapter 12" from Hetalia: World☆Stars Volume 1, as well as "Chapter 14", "Chapter 23", and "Chapter 30" from Hetalia: World☆Stars Volume 2 and "Chapter 124" from Hetalia: World☆Stars Volume 4.
138	"Czechia and Slovakia・Part 1"	April 15, 2021
Adapts "Chapter 67", "Chapter 68", and "Chapter 69" from Hetalia: World☆Stars Volume 3.
139	"Czechia and Slovakia・Part 2"	April 22, 2021
Adapts "Chapter 70", "Chapter 71", "Chapter 72", and "Chapter 73" from Hetalia: World☆Stars Volume 3.
140	"Industrial Revolution - Part 1"	April 29, 2021
Adapts "Chapter 39" from Hetalia: World☆Stars Volume 2.
141	"Industrial Revolution - Part 2"	May 6, 2021
Adapts "Chapter 40", "Chapter 41", and "Chapter 42" from Hetalia: World☆Stars Volume 2.
142	"Industrial Revolution - Part 3"	May 13, 2021
Adapts "Chapter 43" from Hetalia: World☆Stars Volume 2 as well as "Chapter 44" and "Chapter 45" from Hetalia: World☆Stars Volume 3.
143	"Industrial Revolution - Part 4"	May 20, 2021
Adapts "Chapter 46", "Chapter 48", "Chapter 49", and "Chapter 50" from Hetalia: World☆Stars Volume 3.
144	"Industrial Revolution - Part 5"	May 27, 2021
Adapts "Chapter 51", "Chapter 52", "Chapter 53", and "Chapter 54" from Hetalia: World☆Stars Volume 3.
145	"Industrial Revolution - Part 6"	June 3, 2021
Adapts "Chapter 55", "Chapter 56", "Chapter 57", "Chapter 58", "Chapter 59", and "Chapter 60" from Hetalia: World☆Stars Volume 3.
146	"Spa Battle and Spain's Kitchen"	June 10, 2021
Adapts "Chapter 118" and "Chapter 120" from Hetalia: World☆Stars Volume 4.
147	"Get Better!"	June 17, 2021
Adapts "Chapter 121", "Chapter 122", "Chapter 123", and the first half of "Chapter 138" from Hetalia: World☆Stars Volume 4.

=== Extra episodes ===
==== Beautiful World ====
No.	Title	Original release date
6	"Buon San Valentino - First Part"; Transliteration: "Varentīno/Zenpen" (Japanese: ヴァレンティーノ / 前編)	April 24, 2013
It's Valentines Day! Italy presents Germany with a bouquet of red roses, prompting Germany to work through a sexual identity crisis with the help of Austria.
7	"Buon San Valentino - Last Part"; Transliteration: "Varentīno/Kōhen" (Japanese: ヴァレンティーノ / 後編)	June 26, 2013
A continuation of Part I, in which a series of misunderstandings results in a lovestruck Germany asking for Italy's hand in marriage.
8	"The Centennial Gift"; Transliteration: "Hyakunen goto no okurimono" (Japanese: 百年ごとの贈り物)	August 28, 2013
9	"Liechtenstein and the Hedgehog country" Transliteration: "Rihitenshutain to harinezumi kokka" (Japanese: リヒテンシュタインとハリネズミ国家)	October 30, 2013
Liechtenstein wonders what her big brother Switzerland does during the war.
10	"I Was Overwhelmed by Heroines"; Transliteration: "Boku ga hiroin ni kakomare sugite se(ry" (Japanese: 僕がヒロインに囲まれ過ぎて世（ry)	February 26, 2014
Estonia falls asleep at the World Meeting, and upon awaking he discovers that all the nations have turned into women. (Commonly referred to as Nyotalia.)

==== World Twinkle ====
No.	Title	Original release date
11	"Germany and Cohabitation"; Transliteration: "Doitsu, dōkyo suru" (Japanese: ドイツ、同居する)	October 28, 2015
Germany talks about living with Austria.
12	"Netherlands and Isolationist Japan"; Transliteration: "Oranda-san to sakoku Nippon" (Japanese: オランダさんと鎖国ニッポン)	November 25, 2015
Netherlands attempts to make Japan open up to the outside world a little.
13	"The Ruler of Scandinavia and The King of Eastern Europe"; Transliteration: "Hokuō no hasha to Tōō no ōja" (Japanese: 北欧の覇者と東欧の王者)	December 25, 2015
As they prepare for battle against Lithuania and Poland, Finland tells Sweden a story about a battle between Poland and Lithuania and the Teutonic Knights.
14	"Surprise Halloween!"; Transliteration: "Sapuraizu Harouīn!" (Japanese: サプライズ・ハロウィーン！)	February 24, 2016
America throws a Halloween party.

==== World Stars ====
No.	Title	Original release date
15	"Belgium, Luxembourg, the Netherlands and "That" Dog"	July 28, 2021
Adapts "Chapter 116" from Hetalia: World☆Stars Volume 4, as well as Luxembourg and Belgium and Tulip Fever from the original webcomic.
16	"Celebrate Christmas!"	July 28, 2021
Adapts "Chapter 16" and "Chapter 17" from Hetalia: World☆Stars Volume 2.
17	"Celebrate the New Year!"	July 28, 2021
Adapts "Chapter 18", "Chapter 19", and "Chapter 21" from Hetalia: World☆Stars Volume 2.

=== Movies ===
No.	Title	Original release date
-	"Paint it, White"	June 5, 2010
A grey-white faceless alien race called Pictonians are attempting to take over Earth and transform all its inhabitants into their own kind. The G8 try to stop them.
