= The Courthouse, Thirsk =

Building in North Yorkshire, England

Coordinates: 54°13′51″N 1°20′42″W

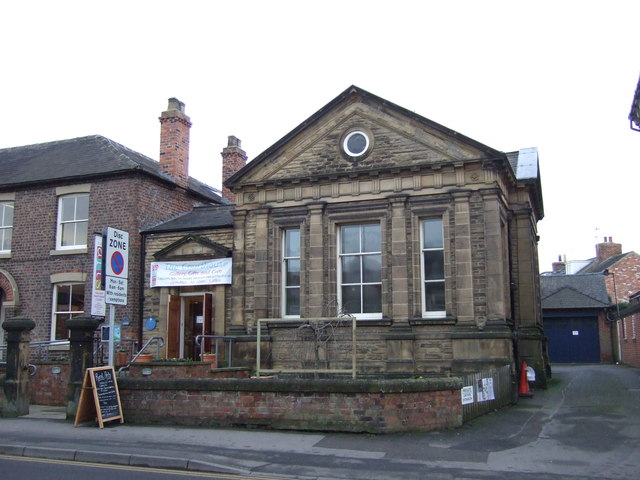
The building, in 2011

The Courthouse is a historic building in the Sowerby area of Thirsk, a town in North Yorkshire, in England.

A courthouse was constructed in the town in about 1840. Between 1885 and 1886, a new courthouse was built next door, and the original building was converted into a house for the inspector. The building was extended to the rear in the 20th century. The court closed in the late 20th century, and the building was converted into a base for the Rural Arts charity. The charity describes it as "the only professionally run cross-arts centre" in the county. The building was grade II listed in 1998, and was refurbished in 2021.

The inspector's house is built of brick with stone dressings and a shallow hipped slate roof. It has two storeys and three bays. It has a central round-headed doorway and sash windows. The court house is joined to the house by a link containing a doorway. The court house is in stone with a slate roof. On the front are windows flanked by Doric pilasters, above which is an entablature, and a pediment containing a circular window. In front of the buildings is a low brick wall with stone coping and a gate.

== See also ==
- Listed buildings in Sowerby, North Yorkshire
