= VetUK =

Online retailer

VetUK Ltd
- Founded: 2005
- Headquarters: Thirsk, North Yorkshire
- Area served: United Kingdom; Europe
- Founder: Iain Booth
- Industry: online retailing
- Employees: 35 (October 2014)
- Website: vetuk.co.uk veterinairefr.fr

VetUK Ltd is an online retailer of pet care products, including veterinary medicines. The company was founded in 2005; filled its millionth order in 2012, and two millionth in 2014.

VetUK is based in Thirsk, North Yorkshire and has an office in York. It turned over £10M in 2010.

As of 2012, VetUK sold 10,000 different products and was growing sales at 30% per year.

Its own brands include Max and Molly, Nutrecare, and PetUK.

== History ==
VetUK was established in 2005 by veterinary surgeon Iain Booth and scientist Lyane Haywood to sell over-the-counter veterinary medicines. According to Booth "I had clients telling me there wasn't enough choice and products were too expensive, so I had thought about selling pet medicines over the internet. I tested my idea first selling via eBay, and when I realised people liked it, I launched the site." The company was entirely self-funded, and initially it operated out of Booth's living room.

In August 2012, VetUK bought Kidderminster based Nutrecare.
