= Thirsk =

Market town and civil parish in North Yorkshire, England

Coordinates: 54°13′58″N 1°20′31″W

- Town
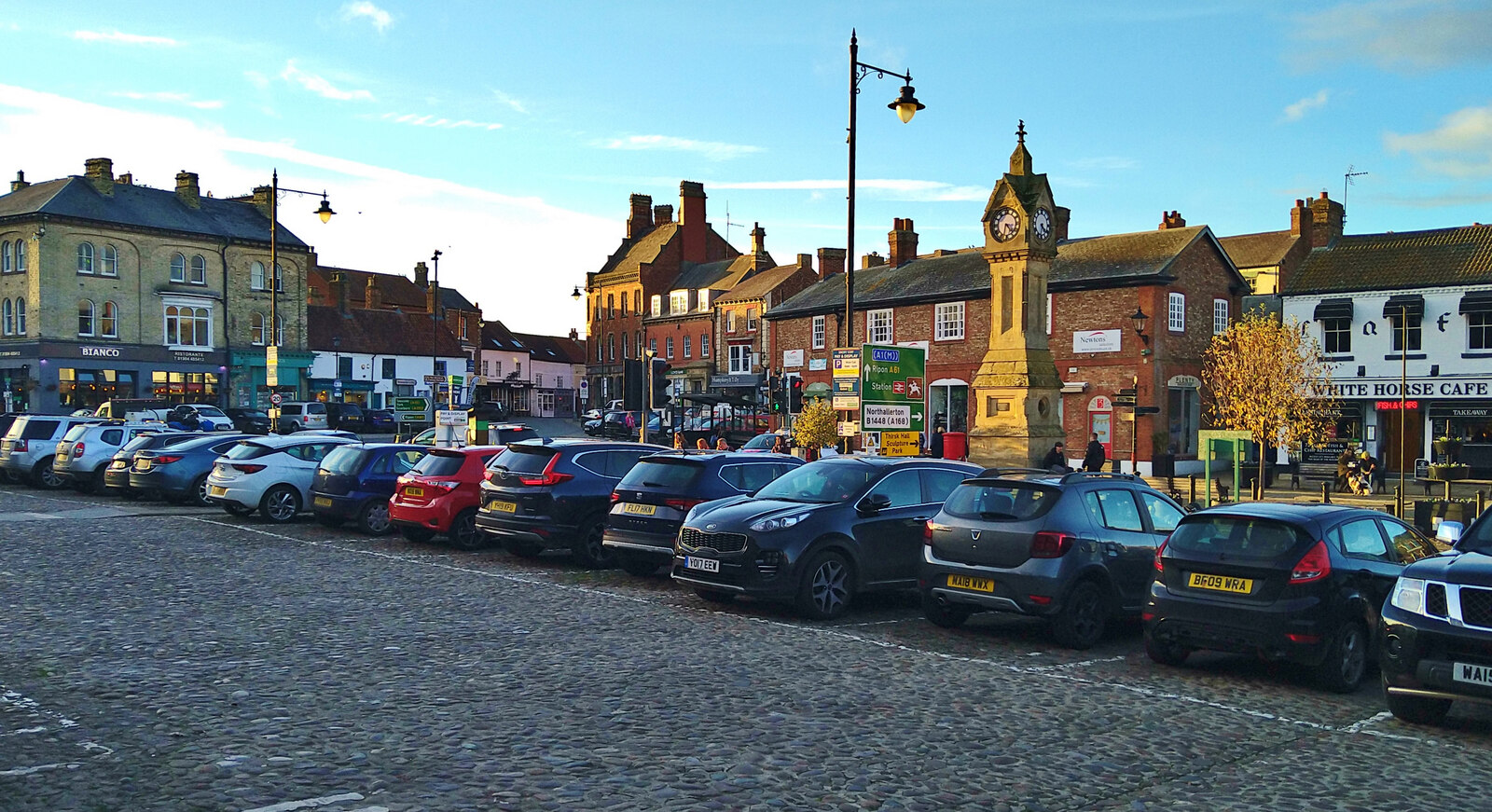
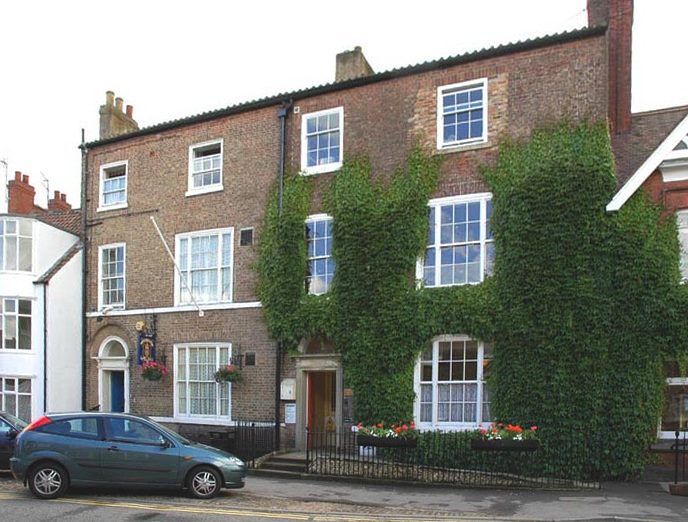
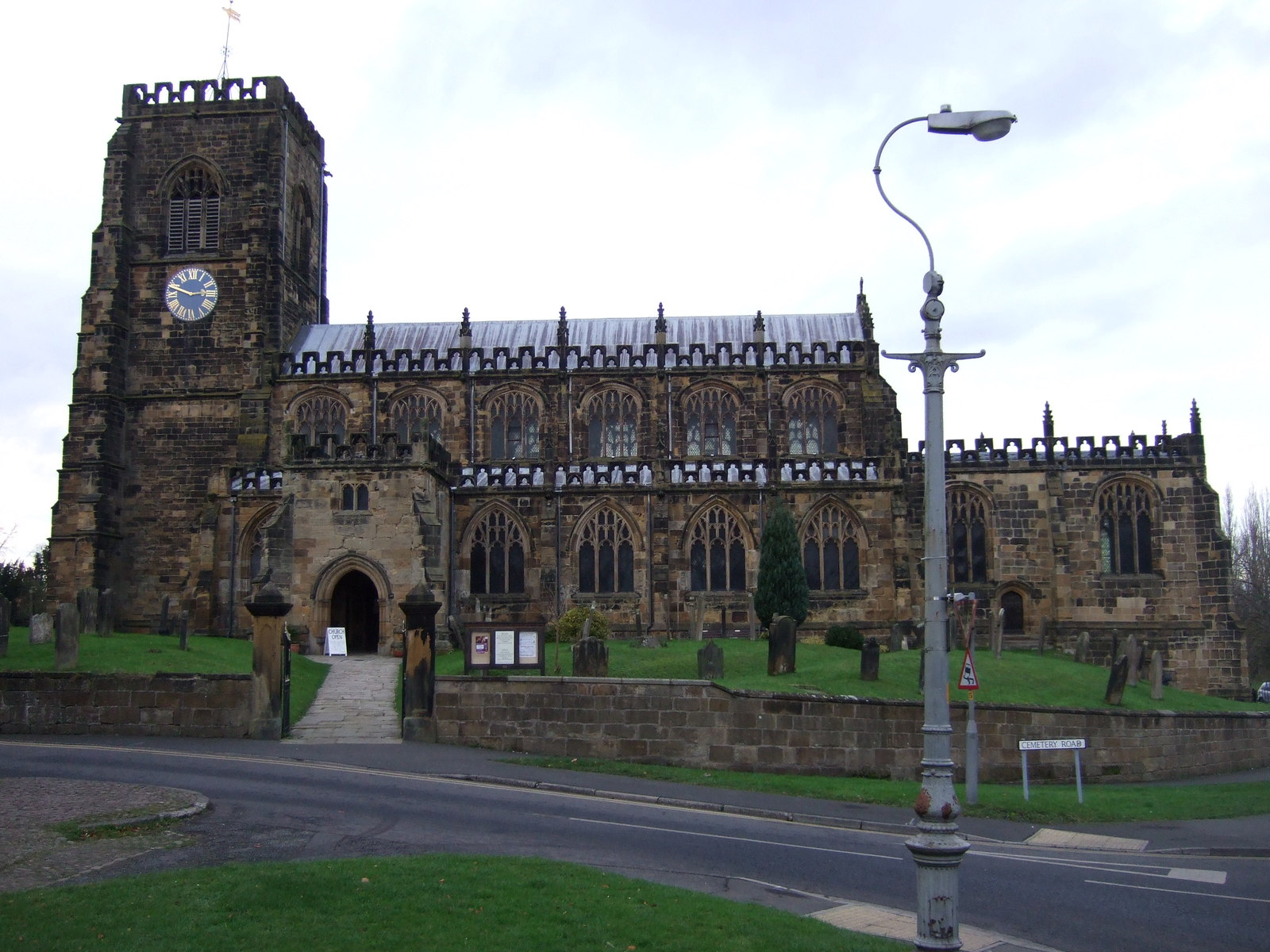
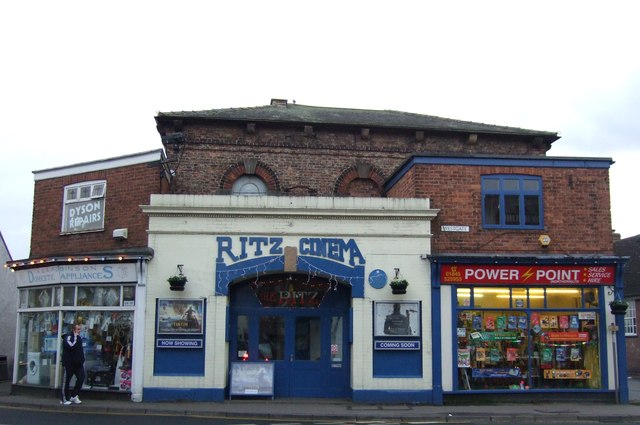
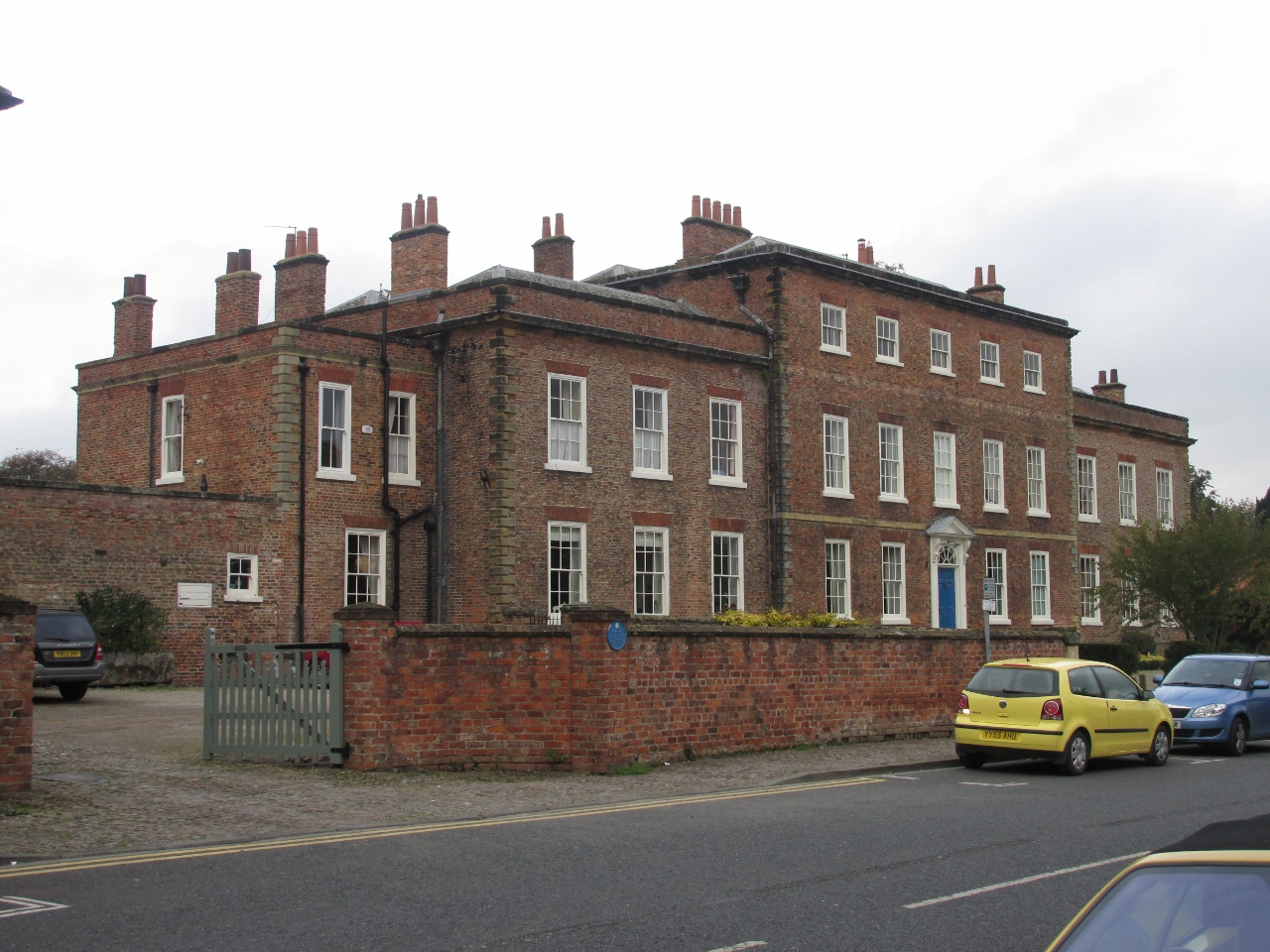
- Thirsk Market Square The World of James Herriot St Mary's Church Ritz Cinema Thirsk Hall

- Location within North Yorkshire
- Population: (2011 census)
  - Civil parish: 4,998
  - Built-up area: 9,953
- OS grid reference: SE429820
  - London: 227 miles (365 km)
- Civil parish: Thirsk
- Unitary authority: North Yorkshire
- Ceremonial county: North Yorkshire
- Region: Yorkshire and the Humber
- Country: England
- Sovereign state: United Kingdom
- Post town: THIRSK
- Postcode district: YO7
- Dialling code: 01845
- Police: North Yorkshire
- Fire: North Yorkshire
- Ambulance: Yorkshire
- UK Parliament: Thirsk and Malton
- Website: thirsk-tc.gov.uk

Thirsk is a market town and civil parish in North Yorkshire, England; it is known for its racecourse and depiction as local author James Herriot's fictional Darrowby.

== History ==
Archeological finds indicate there was a settlement in Thirsk around 500–600 BC. The town's name is derived from the Old Norse word þresk, meaning 'fen' or 'lake'.

Thirsk is mentioned twice in the 1086 Domesday Book as Tresche, in the Yarlestre wapentake, a village with ten households. At the time of the Norman invasion the manor was split between Orm and Thor, local Anglo-Saxon landowners. Afterwards, it was split between Hugh, son of Baldric, and the Crown.

=== House of Mowbray ===
Most of Thirsk was granted to a Robert de Mowbray from Montbray in Normandy, for whose descendants the House of Mowbray and the Vale of Mowbray are named.

By 1145, what is now Old Thirsk had gained a Market charter giving it town and borough status. The remaining land in the parish was under manorial rights.

The Mowbray family built a castle on the north side of Castlegate. It is not mentioned in the Domesday Book and an exact date is not recorded for its construction, but it was completely destroyed by 1176 following an uprising against Henry II.

William de Mowbray, 6th Baron of Thirsk, 4th Baron Mowbray, was one of the 25 executors of the Magna Carta in 1215. The Mowbrays built a manor house on the old castle site which was destroyed by the Scots in 1322. The manor continued to be in the Mowbrays' possession, despite several claims, until the death of the 16th Lord Mowbray in 1476.

=== Berkeley and Derby ===
After the War of the Roses, Henry VII raised taxes that caused uprisings in the north leading to the murder of Henry Percy, 4th Earl of Northumberland, either on The Little Green, where he was sent to collect taxes, or in nearby South Kilvington. With no direct succession, the daughter of Thomas de Mowbray, 1st Duke of Norfolk, who had married into the Berkeley family, inherited the manor. Her son, William de Berkeley, 1st Marquess of Berkeley, inherited it on her death. For some years, the manor was held by Thomas Stanley Earl of Derby, whose successors held it after William's death, until 1723.

=== Bell, Industrial Revolution and modern ===
In that year, it was sold by James, Earl of Derby to Ralph Bell of Sowerby, "whose descendants thereafter held the manor". It remained in the Bell family into the 20th century.

Thirsk Hall in Kirkgate is a grade II* listed three-storey town house built in 1720 and extended in 1770 by York architect John Carr.

A 1767 act of Parliament, the Codbreck Brook Navigation Act 1766 (7 Geo. 3. c. 95) provided for building a navigable waterway to the town from the River Swale along Cod Beck. The project ran out of funds and was never completed, although remains can be seen of the wharf and a lock near Lock Bridge.

A 'squalid' but 'humane' poorhouse, for up to 40 paupers of the parish, was established in 1737 between Long Street and St James Green. One hundred years later in 1837, the Thirsk Poor Law Union was formed to serve the wider district. Despite mob protests and the 'burning of effigies', it erected a workhouse on Sutton Road in 1838, initially with a capacity of 120 beds. At the time of the 1881 census, there were 81 residents, including staff and inmates. The building was used for military and first-aid purposes during World War II. Before conversion to housing, it was used to rear chickens and as a factory.

A rail crash occurred at Manor House signal box on 2 November 1892, on the North Eastern Railway about 3 miles (4.8 km) north of Thirsk railway station, when an express train collided with the back of a goods train, both heading south in fog. There were 10 people killed and 43 injured. Another took place on 31 July 1967 on the East Coast Main Line. On that occasion an express train travelling north collided with a derailed freight train. Seven people were killed and 45 injured.

== Governance ==
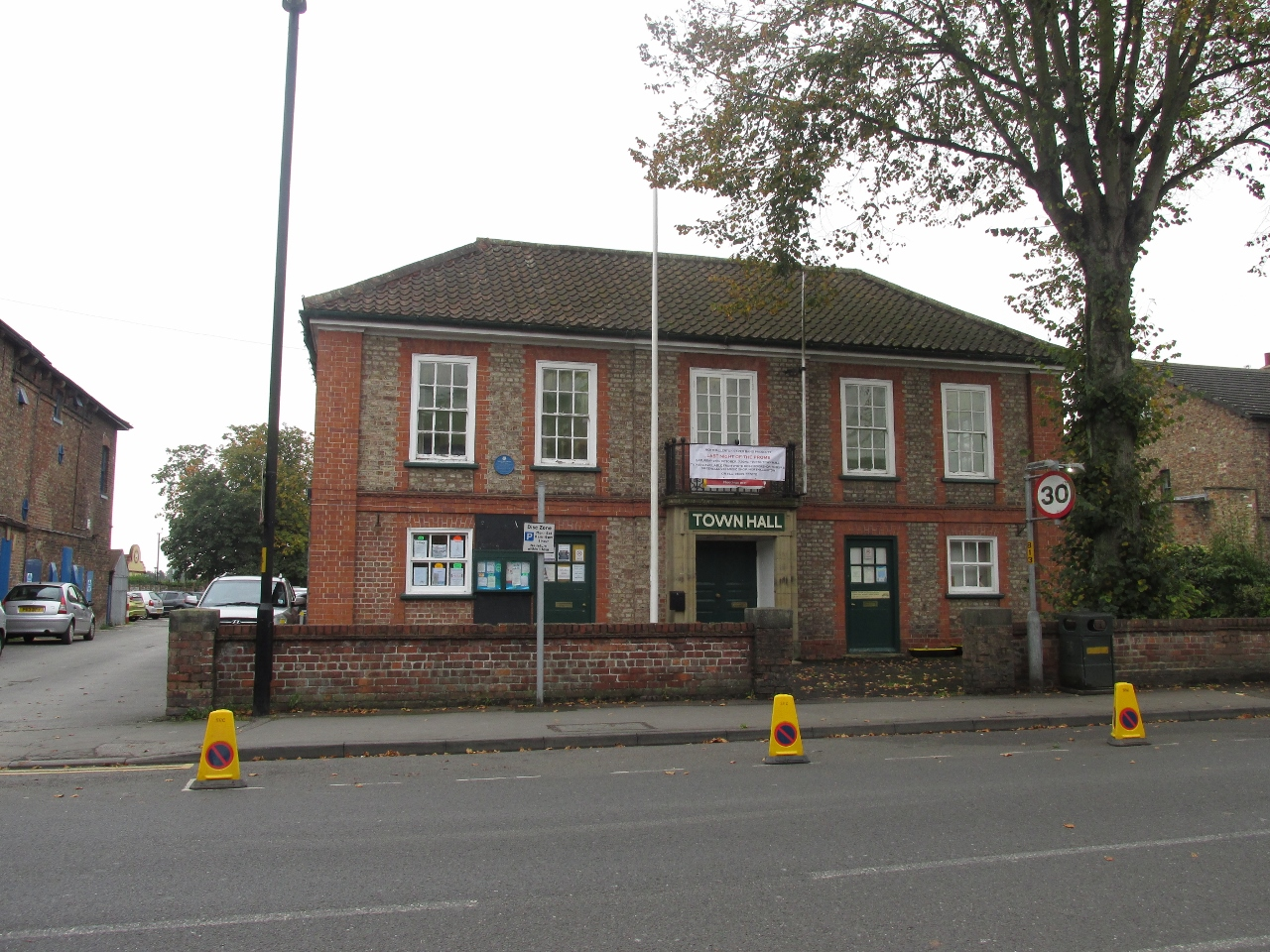
Thirsk and Sowerby Town Hall

Thirsk has been in the Thirsk and Malton parliamentary constituency since its creation for the 2010 general election. Kevin Hollinrake was elected MP at the 2015 UK general election.

The town was a parliamentary borough that had representation in 1295, and then from 1547 to 1885. For the majority of the latter period, it was represented by two members until 1882, when it was reduced to one member.

The constituency of Thirsk and Malton was originally created for the 1885 general election by the Redistribution of Seats Act 1885, and existed until 1983. During that period it returned six Conservative party members to parliament, which included one by-election in 1915.

The Civil Parish of Thirsk was created by the Local Government Act 1894. The Local Government Act 1972 afforded parish councils the opportunity to change titles. Thirsk renamed itself a town council. In so doing, the chairman was also renamed as mayor. The council is represented by eleven councillors. The town council meets at Thirsk and Sowerby Town Hall.

From 1974 to 2023 it was part of the Hambleton District, it is now administered by the unitary North Yorkshire Council.

== Geography ==
Place	Distance	Direction	Relation
London	192 miles (309 km)	South	Capital city
Middlesbrough	24 miles (39 km)	North-east	Most populated place in the ceremonial county of North Yorkshire
York	22 miles (35 km)	South-west	Historic county town
Northallerton	8 miles (13 km)	North	County town

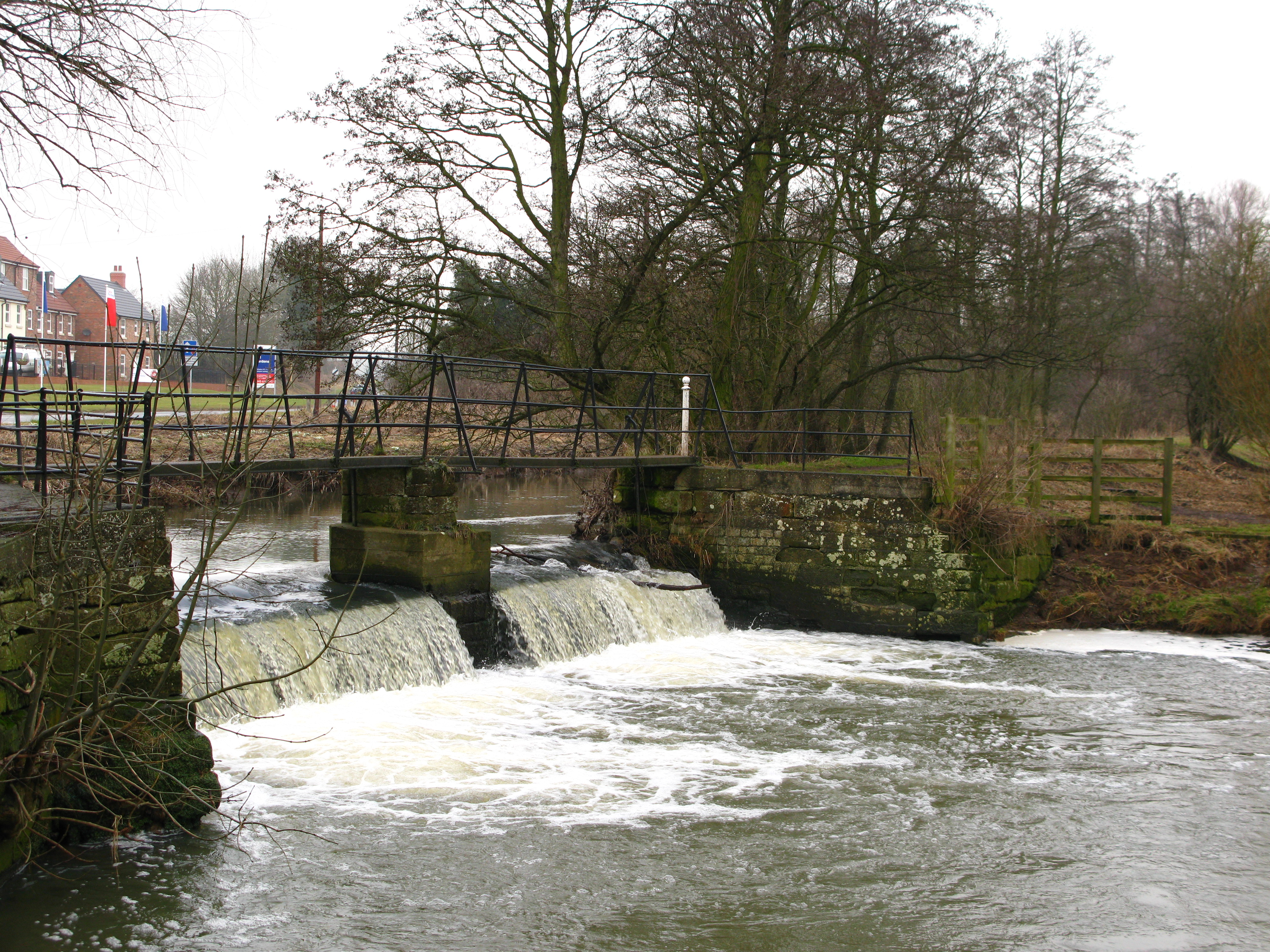
Cod Beck Weir, Thirsk

Thirsk is in the Vale of Mowbray and situated around the Cod Beck. Within Thirsk, Norby lies to the north-west, and Old Thirsk to the north-east. The separate parish of Sowerby abuts to the south.

Nearby villages with names of Danish origin, identified by the suffix by meaning village, include Thirlby, Boltby and Borrowby.

== Demography ==
The 1881 UK Census recorded the population of the parish as 3,337.

The parish had a population of 4,703 according to the 2001 Census.

The 2011 UK Census recorded the population as 4,998, an increase of 33% over the past 120 years, with a density of 3.9 people per hectare. Of the total population, 48.9% were male and 51.1% were female. The ethnic make up of the town was 94.3% White British, 3.0% Other White, 0.9% Asian British and 0.2% Black/Mixed and other Ethnic Groups. The religious composition of the town was 71.7% Christian, 27.4% None or no religion stated, 0.3% Muslim, 0.2% Buddhist, 0.1% Hindu, 0.1% Jewish and 0.0% Sikh.

== Economy ==
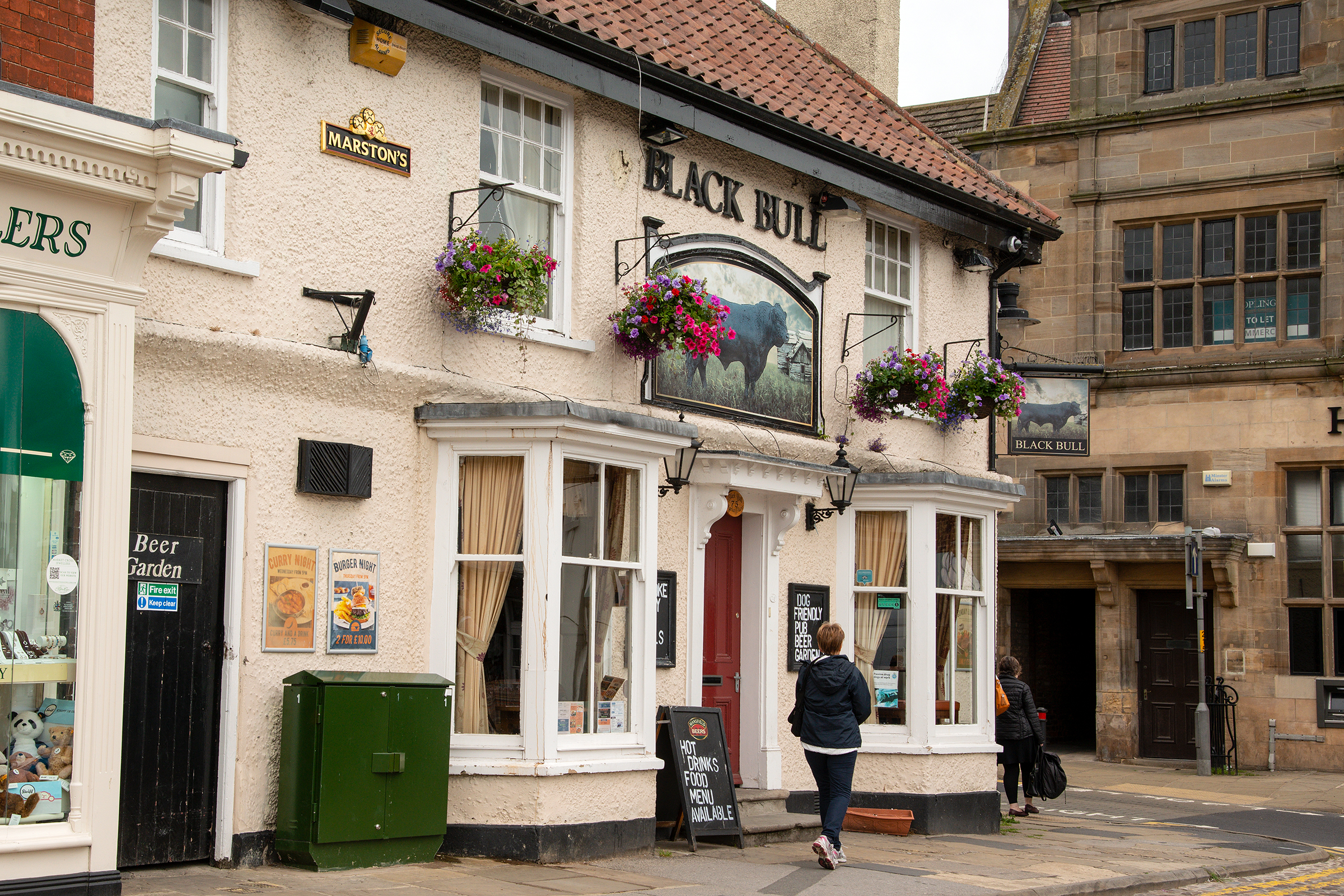
Thirsk has many facilities for tourists

Thirsk's medieval market place in the town centre hosts an open-air market each Monday and Saturday. The market was established in 1145 and remains a focal point for traders and visitors. Tourism and hospitality are major parts of the town's economy.

Severfield plc based on nearby former RAF Dalton, and VetUK are significant employers in the area.

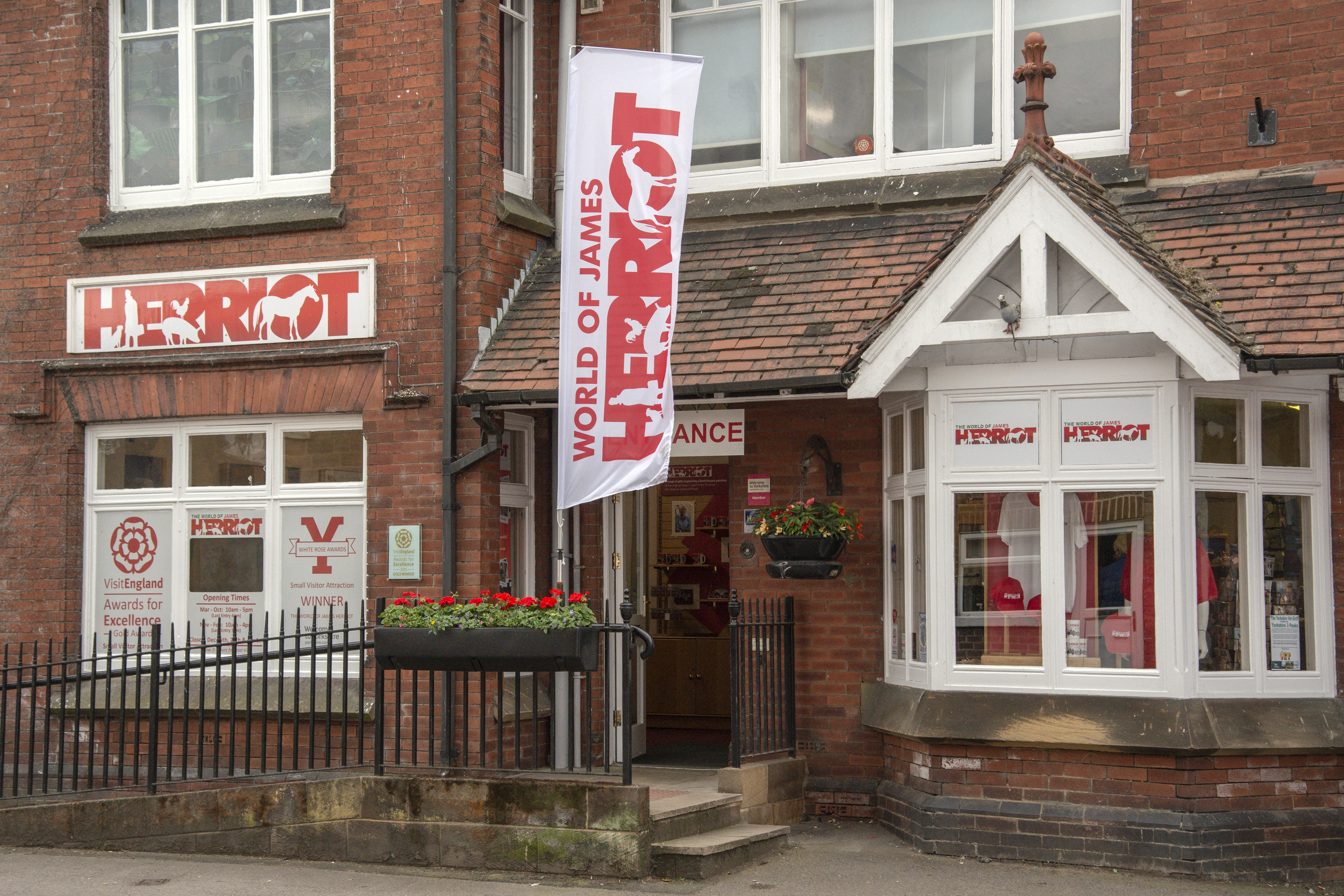
The Herriot Museum, June 2018

There is a livestock auction market to the south-east of the town.

The town had a reputation for its leather tanning and saddlery trade, but by the 19th century was better known for the production of agricultural implements.

== Culture ==
Thirsk Museum is operated by a team of volunteers in the house where Thomas Lord was born and is now home to Busby's stoop chair.

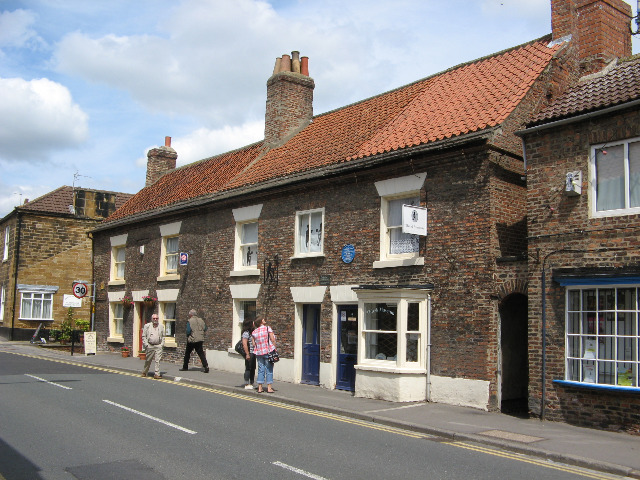
Thirsk Museum

The Courthouse, in adjoining Sowerby, has been an arts space since 1992.

The World of James Herriot is a visitor attraction in the former home and veterinary surgery of author James Herriot. Scenes from the Channel 5 adaptation of his books were filmed in the town.

Controversially, parts of the 2011 splatter film Inbred portrayed Thirsk as Mortlake.

Photography for Pulp's Different Class album art was taken around Thirsk and includes shots of Thirsk Market Place, Hambleton Estate, Tesco's supermarket on Station Road, Sowerby and Ripon Way in nearby Carlton Miniott. Local children feature in pictures accompanying the work known for its track, "Common People".

In 2018, the first series of The Heist was filmed in and around Thirsk. The on-screen thieves were all residents of the town or surrounding area, and the crime's location was Marage Road. The same year, filming also took place in Thirsk for The Runaways.

A character in Downton Abbey refers to an undertaker from Thirsk who can collect bodies on a Sunday. The historical drama also mentions nearby Easingwold and Ripon.

The Thirsk Hall Sculpture Park opened in 2021 in the grounds of Thirsk Hall. Artists that have been featured in the park include Michael Lyons, Zak Ové, and Emily Young.

=== Local media ===
Local news and television programmes are provided by BBC Yorkshire and BBC North East and Cumbria on BBC One & ITV Yorkshire and ITV Tyne Tees on ITV1. Television signals can be received from either Emley Moor or Bilsdale TV transmitters.

Thirsk's local radio stations are BBC Radio York on 104.3 FM, Greatest Hits Radio Yorkshire (formerly Minster FM) on 102.3 FM, and YO1 Radio on 102.8 FM.

The town is served by these local newspapers:

- The Thirsk Weekly News
- Darlington & Stockton Times
- The Northern Echo

== Transport ==
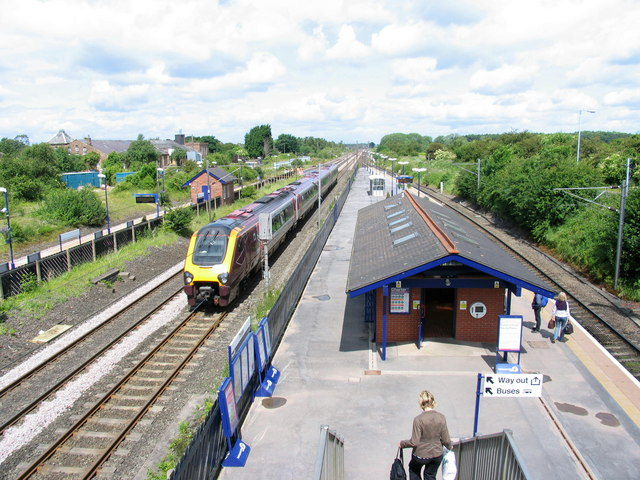
Thirsk Station

Thirsk railway station is 22.25 miles (36 km) north of York on the East Coast Main Line and situated 1.5 miles (2 km) from the centre of Thirsk, in Carlton Miniott.

Bus services for York, Ripon, Northallerton and local villages stop in Thirsk market place.

The A61, passes through Thirsk market place. Since 1972 the A19 has bypassed Thirsk to the east of the town.

== Education ==
The town has one primary school, Thirsk Community Primary, with three others in the adjoining village of Sowerby. It is within the catchment area of Thirsk School and Sixth Form College for secondary education. The current primary school was opened in 1979 with an extension added in 1991 to house extra classrooms, nursery section and medical facilities. Due to rises in the school population, some temporary build classrooms have also been erected on site. It is a mixed gender school catering for pupils between the ages of 3 and 11. It has a student capacity of 315 and as of 2013 was at 90.5% of that.

== Religion ==
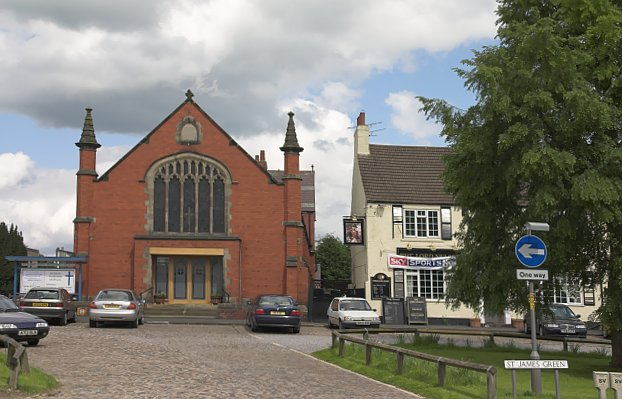
Chapel on St James Green in Thirsk

St Mary's Church is a Grade I listed, 15th-century church. There are gouges created by sharpening arrows and knives in the porch, and by the altar in the chancel.

Thirsk Quaker Meeting House on Kirkgate has been on that site since at least 1799.

In 1861, the Wesleyan Chapel on St James' Green was built.

A Roman Catholic church dedicated to All Saints was added in 1867 on Castlegate.

== Sport ==
=== Horse racing ===
Thirsk Racecourse is a thoroughbred horse racing venue consisting of a left handed oval of about one mile and two furlongs. The present course opened in 1923, but racing had taken place on the old course at nearby Black Hambleton over 200 years earlier. The racecourse serves flat racing in the spring and summer months.

=== Athletic Club ===
The Thirsk Amateur Tennis Championship was played at Thirsk from 1882 to 1908.

Thirsk Cricket Club was founded in 1851 and play in the middle of Thirsk Racecourse. The club was a founder member of the York & District League in which they still compete.

Thirsk Hockey Club have been affiliated to the Yorkshire Hockey Association since 1923. Until Thirsk School laid a floodlit, artificial pitch they played on grass pitches on the out field of the Cricket Club. They still share the Cricket Clubhouse for social facilities.

=== Football ===
Thirsk Falcons FC compete in the Teesside Football League, which is at the 13th level of the English football league system.

=== Rugby ===
Thirsk RUFC is a Rugby Union Club which competes in the Yorkshire Division 4 North West league.

=== Cycling ===
Thirsk was on the route of the Tour de Yorkshire in 2016 and 2018.

== People ==
- Mary Bateman (1768–1809), murderer and alleged witch
- John Bell (1809–1851), politician and lord of the manor who thought he was a bird.
- Charles Camidge (1837–1911), Rural Dean of Thirsk, later Anglican Bishop of Bathurst
- Tasha Ghouri (born 1998), television personality, dancer and model
- Jasmine Harrison (born c. 2000), British adventurer
- James Herriot, pen name of Veterinary surgeon James Alfred Wight (1916–1995), author of semi-autobiographical books based on his career.
- Jay Jopling (born 1963), art dealer credited with popularising the Young British Artists
- Thomas Lord (1755–1832), founded Lord's Cricket Ground
- Roger de Mowbray (c. 1120–1188), lived at Thirsk Castle with his mother
- Keith Robinson (born 1933), cricketer
- Georgia Steel (born 1998), television personality

== See also ==
- Listed buildings in Thirsk
- Carlton Miniott
- South Kilvington
- Sowerby
