= St Oswald's Church, Sowerby =

Coordinates: 54.2263°N 1.3402°W

St Oswald's Church
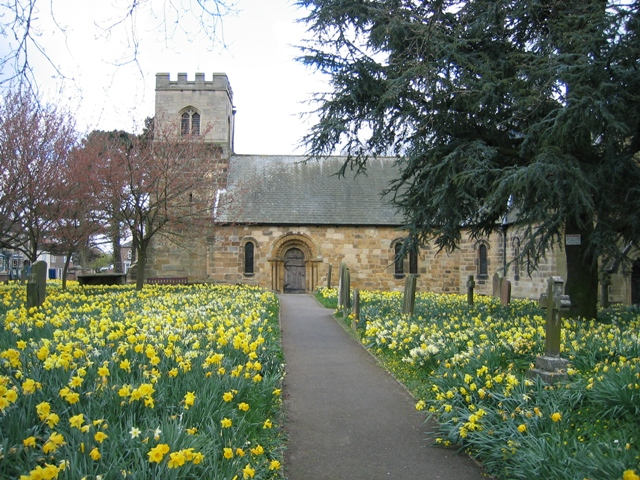
- The Parish Church of St Oswald
- St Oswald's Church
- OS grid reference: SE 43115 81374
- Location: Sowerby, North Yorkshire
- Country: England
- Denomination: Church of England
- Website: www.stoswaldsowerby.org.uk

History
- Status: Parish church

Architecture
- Functional status: Active
- Heritage designation: Grade II*
- Designated: 20 June 1966

Administration
- Province: Province of York
- Diocese: Diocese of York

St Oswald's Church is a Church of England parish church in Sowerby, North Yorkshire, England. It is named after Oswald of Northumbria.

== History ==
The earliest church at Sowerby of which any part remains appears to have been built about 1140. The fine south doorway was probably built in the eleventh century and most of the stone work in the south wall of the nave is of medieval date. The tower, which contains the remains of the Norman church, was built in the fifteenth century with a hagioscope through which the altar is seen. In 1842, the church was restored and enlarged in nineteenth century Norman style. In 1883, further restoration and repair included the erection of an open Lantern of woodwork surmounted by a slated spire above the chancel crossing. In 1902, the north wall was taken down and made into an arcade and a spacious north aisle built. In the 1980s, re-ordering of the church took place including adding a free-standing altar to allow more intimate congregational worship. The church was Grade II* listed in 1966.

The churchyard contains two Commonwealth war graves, of a Royal Air Force boy airman of the First World War and a Royal Armoured Corps soldier of the Second World War.

== See also ==
- Grade II* listed buildings in North Yorkshire (district)
- Listed buildings in Sowerby, North Yorkshire

== Gallery ==
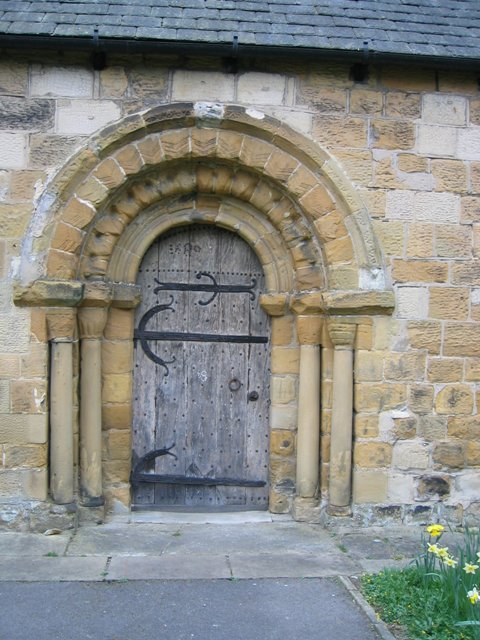
Norman doorway

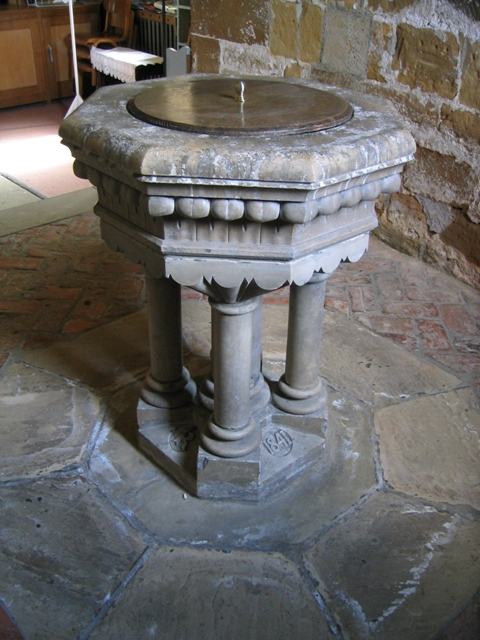
The font

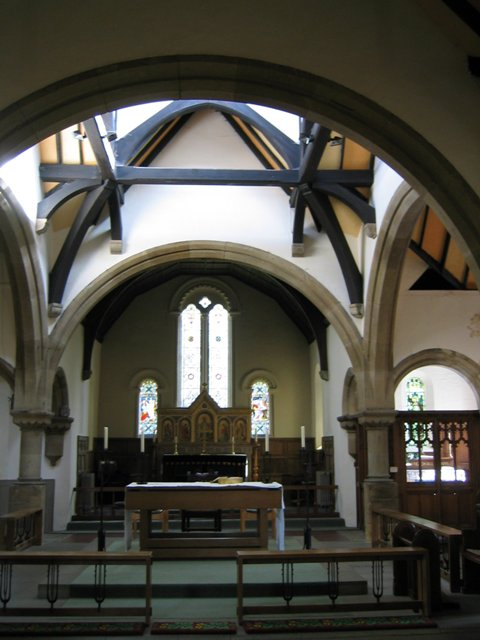
Chancel with altar
