= Ritz Cinema, Thirsk =

Cinema in Sowerby, North Yorkshire, England

Coordinates: 54.231255°N 1.343937°W

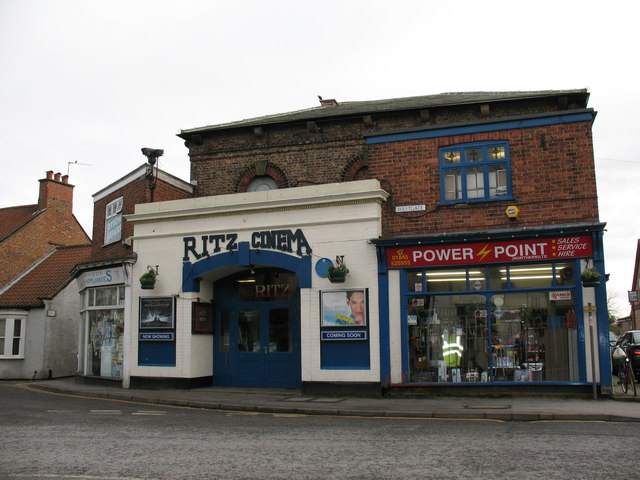
The Ritz Cinema in 2007.

The Ritz Cinema on Westgate, Sowerby, North Yorkshire, England is a small (180 seat) cinema run by volunteers. The building was originally the Mechanics' Institute for Thirsk and Sowerby, but was converted into a cinema in 1912. Today, it is one of Britain's oldest operating cinemas.

== History ==
Originally the cinema was known as Powers after Walter Powers, the man who ran the picture house in its first incarnation with silent movies. In 1927, when the talkies arrived, he extended the seating in the cinema by adding the balcony.

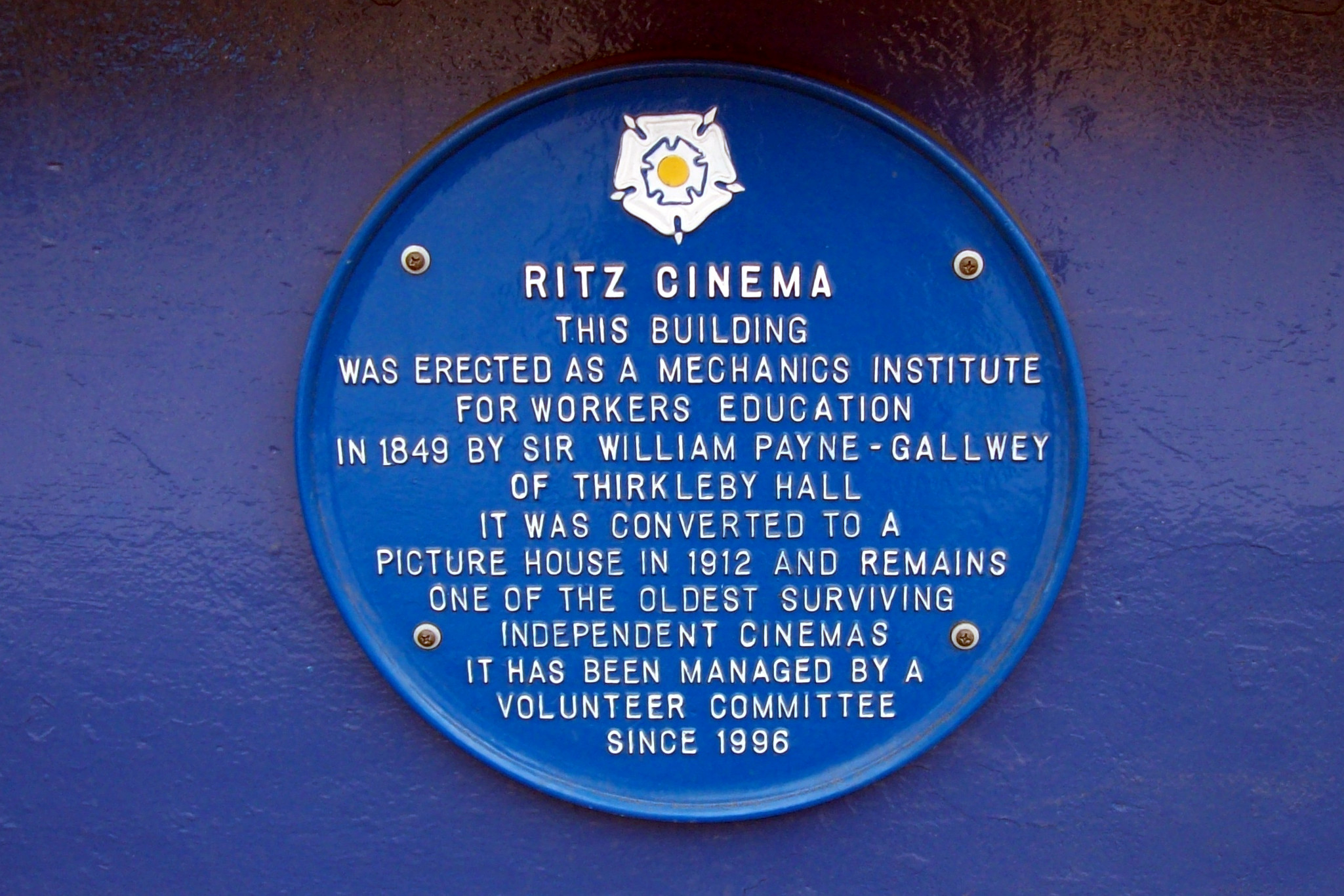
Historic plaque

During the First World War, Powers "gave free shows to wounded soldiers".

In 1953, the Ritz was purchased by the Star Group which operated over 90 cinemas; during that ownership, the cinema was named Studio One and occasionally ran bingo sessions. The business then closed in early 1972 but reopened under new owners in 1984 (1981 according to one source); that continued until another brief closure in 1994.

=== Recent history ===
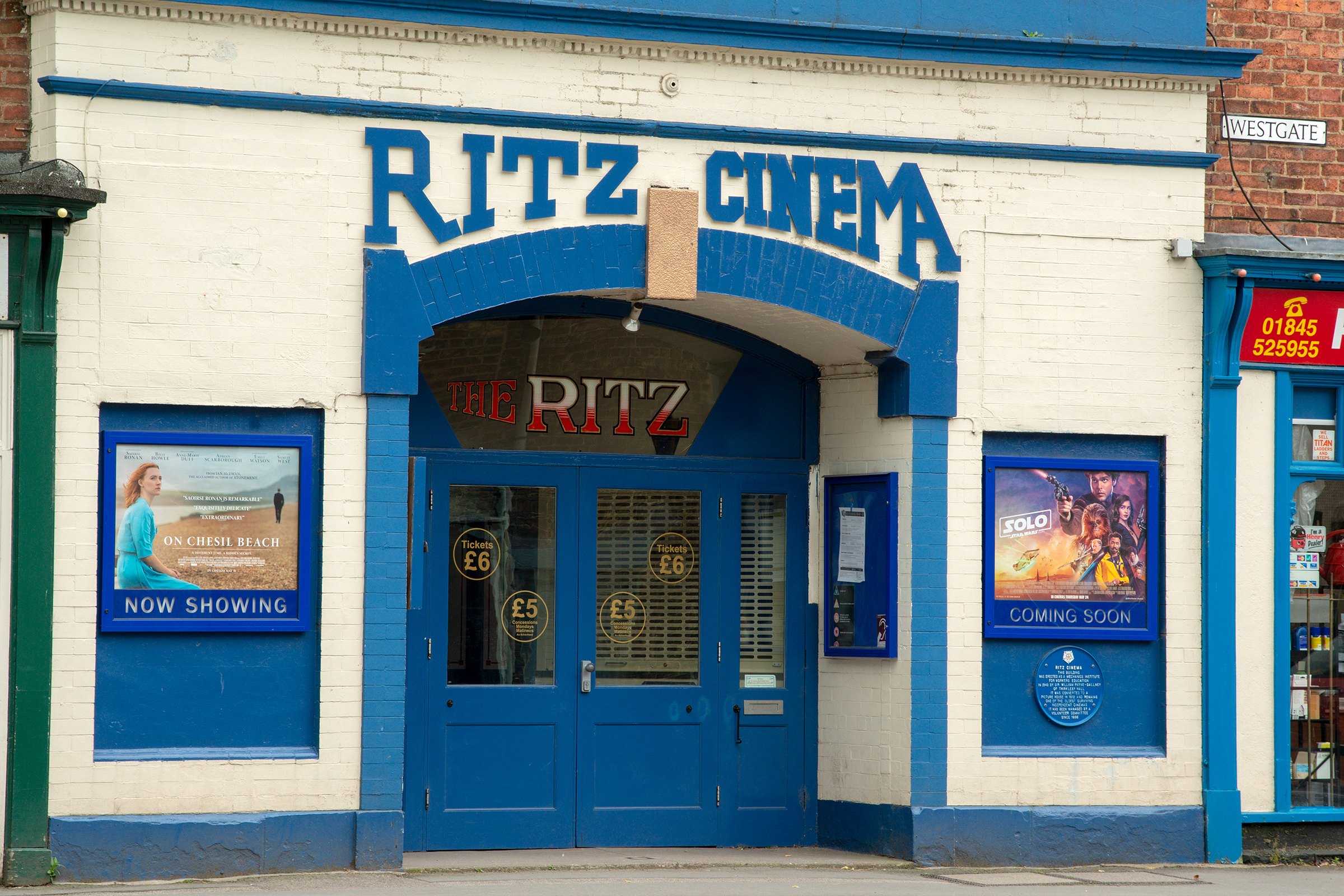
The Ritz Cinema in 2018

In 1995, a group of volunteers got together to run it as a social project for Thirsk and Sowerby, initially as a Thirsk Town Council venture, although that management lasted only a year. The business has been fully operated by volunteers since 1996, when the management role shifted to a Volunteer Committee. According to a Yorkshire Post item in January 2011, this is "the longest entirely volunteer-run cinema in the country".

In March 2012, the Ritz installed Digital projection equipment, purchased under a Digital Print Scheme through the Cinema Exhibitors' Association (CEA). Better seating, new decor, a new screen and Dolby Surround Sound were also installed since early 1995. In a period setting, the cinema shows current films.

The Ritz was closed for some months in 2020-2021 due to lockdowns necessitated by the COVID-19 pandemic. In early January 2021, the government's Culture Recovery Fund provided a grant of £6,400 to help cover some of the loss.

== Filming location ==
The cinema was used as a backdrop for the filming of the second series of All Creatures Great and Small in June 2021.
