= Thirsk Amateur Tennis Championship =

Thirsk Championship

Defunct tennis tournament
- Tour: LTA Circuit
- Founded: 1882; 144 years ago
- Abolished: 1908; 118 years ago
- Location: Thirsk, North Yorkshire, England
- Venue: Thirsk Lawn Tennis Club
- Surface: Grass

The Thirsk Amateur Tennis Championship was a British tennis competition founded in July 1882 as the Thirsk Lawn Tennis Tournament. The tournament organised by Thirsk Lawn Tennis Club at Thirsk, North Yorkshire, England and was played annually until 1908 when it was discontinued.

== History ==
In 1878 Thirsk Athletic Club was founded. In 1880 a tennis section was added to the club and the name was changed to Thirsk Athletic Sports Club. In 1882 Thirsk Lawn Tennis Club part of the sports club held its first annual tennis tournament.

The winner of the first men's singles title was Pelham George von Donop. The tournament was held annually through till 1908 when it was discontinued. The final men's singles champion was Charles Gladstone Allen. Thirsk Lawn Tennis Club is still operating today and is a member of the Yorkshire LTA. It is still part of the Thirsk Athletic Sports and Social Club.

== Finals ==
=== Men's singles ===
(Incomplete roll)

Year	Winner	Runner-up	Score
1882	(United Kingdom) Pelham George von Donop	(England) Arthur Godfrey Pease	6–4, 6–1
1886	(England) Seward Wilfrid Meek	(United Kingdom) C.H.C. Harrison	6–2, 6–4
1887	(England) Seward Wilfrid Meek (2)	(England) Arthur George Ridout	6–3, 4–6, 6–2
1888	(Ireland) Ernest Browne	(United Kingdom) Seward Wilfrid Meek	2–6, 8–6, 6–3
1908	(United Kingdom) Charles Gladstone Allen	(United Kingdom) Alan Proctor	w.o.

=== Men's doubles ===
(Incomplete roll)

Year	Winners	Runners-up	Score
1886	(United Kingdom) T.L. Johnston (United Kingdom) Thomas Oswald Swarbreck	(United Kingdom) W.T. Baines (United Kingdom) C.H.C. Harrison	w.o.

=== Mixed doubles ===
(Incomplete roll)

Year	Winners	Runners-up	Score
1886	(United Kingdom) Thomas Oswald Swarbreck (United Kingdom) Mrs. Swarbreck	(United Kingdom) E.M. Turner (United Kingdom) Miss. Turner	6–2, 6–3
