= Busby Stoop Chair =

Allegedly haunted chair

Coordinates: 54.233°N 1.344°W

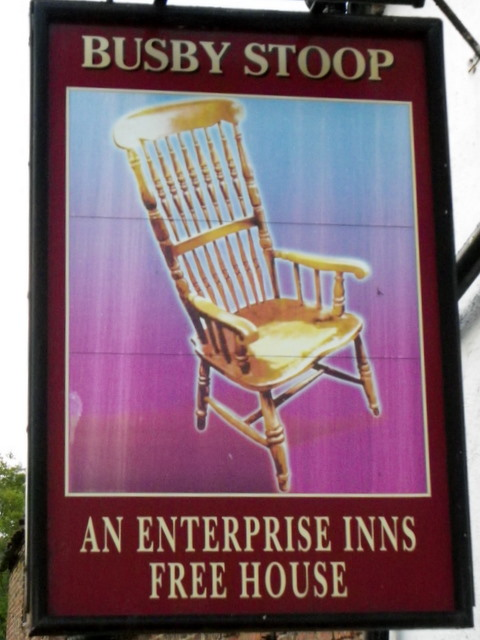
The sign of the Busby Stoop pub, where the chair was previously in use

The Busby Stoop Chair or the Dead Man's Chair is an oak chair that was supposedly cursed by the murderer Thomas Busby before his execution by hanging in 1702 in North Yorkshire, in the United Kingdom.

The chair is said to have remained in use for centuries at the Busby Stoop inn, near Thirsk. Due to the many deaths later attributed to people sitting in the chair, the landlord donated it to Thirsk Museum in 1978.

A furniture historian examined the chair and found it to have machine-turned spindles, whereas 18th-century chairs were made using a pole lathe. He dated the chair to 1840, 138 years after Busby's execution.

== Background ==
Thomas Busby was arrested, tried and condemned to death after he murdered his father-in-law Daniel Auty (or Autie) in 1702. Auty and Busby were running a coin counterfeiting business (as well as other criminal enterprises) and they argued about the business which ended with Busby killing Auty. One variation of the story has Busby cursing the chair whilst on his way to his execution, whereas another says that he was drunk in the chair when he was arrested and cursed it then.

Busby was gibbeted at Sandhutton crossroads, beside an inn, which later had its name changed to the Busby Stoop Inn. The site of the execution, opposite the pub on the A61 and A167 crossroads (now a roundabout), was said to be haunted by Busby's ghost.

== Deaths ==
Locals claimed that during the Second World War, Canadian airmen from the nearby base at Skipton-on-Swale went to the pub and those who sat in the chair never returned from bombing missions over mainland Europe. In the 1970s some fatal accidents were linked with the chair. In 1978 the chair was ultimately hung from the ceiling of Thirsk Museum to prevent occupancy, even by maintenance.

== Cultural references ==
In the Japanese webcomic Hetalia: Axis Powers, "Busby's Chair" is depicted as an artefact which kills anyone who sits in it, and which causes them to be "dragged straight down to hell".

Busby's chair was mentioned in an episode of the television programme Unsolved Mysteries, and a similar story about a cursed chair was included in an episode of Beyond Belief: Fact or Fiction.
