= Thirsk and Sowerby Town Hall =

Municipal building in Sowerby, North Yorkshire, England

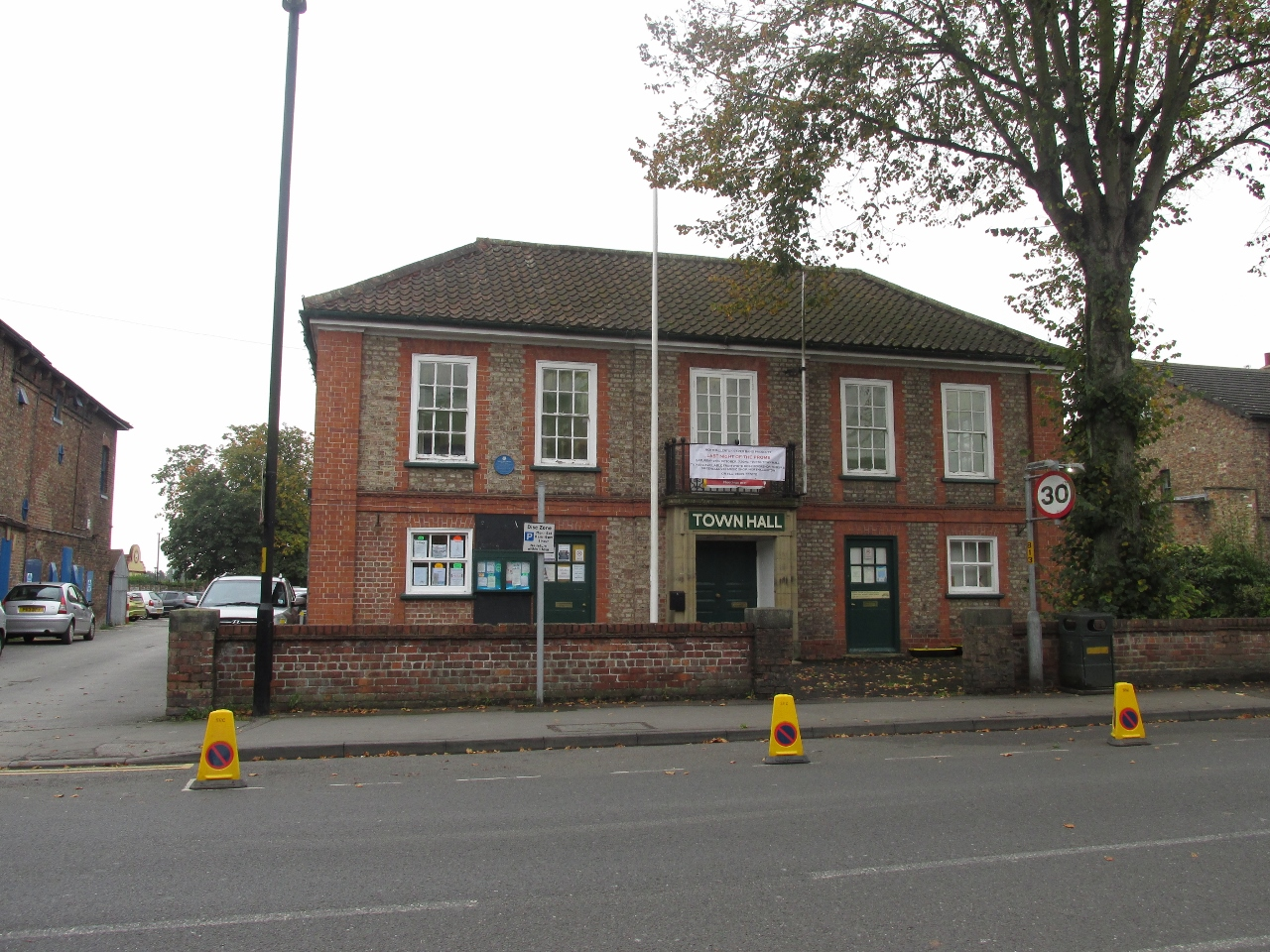
- Thirsk and Sowerby Town Hall

- Shown in North Yorkshire
- 54.2311°N 1.3442°W
- Location: Westgate, Sowerby

History
- Built: 1913

Site notes
- Architect: Walter Brierley
- Architectural style: Neoclassical style

Thirsk and Sowerby Town Hall is a municipal building in Westgate, Sowerby, North Yorkshire, England. Although it is commonly described as being in Thirsk, it is on the south side of Westgate, which is in Sowerby. The building is used as the meeting place of Thirsk Town Council and of Sowerby Parish Council.

== History ==
The first municipal building in Thirsk was a medieval tollbooth in the Market Place; it was used as a venue for the collection of market rents as well as a meeting place but, having become dilapidated, it was demolished in 1838. In the early-20th century, a group of local businessmen decided to form a company to raise funds for the erection of a combined town hall and constitutional club in the town: the site they selected was vacant land on the south side of Westgate. The new building was designed by Walter Brierley in the neoclassical style, built in red and buff bricks with stone dressings and was officially opened on 16 July 1913.

The design involved a symmetrical main frontage with five bays facing onto Westgate; the central bay featured a two-panel doorway flanked by pilasters supporting an entablature and a wrought iron balcony. There was a central French door on the first floor. The flanking bays featured single panel doorways on the ground floor and sash windows on the first floor, while the outer bays were fenestrated by small rectangular windows on the ground floor and sash windows on the first floor. Internally, the principal rooms were the main assembly hall for public meetings and various club rooms including a smoking room, a reading room and a billiards room.

During the First World War, the town hall was used as a Red Cross Voluntary Aid Detachment auxiliary hospital. The building was refurbished in 1974 and re-opened as a cinema by a film enthusiast, Ken Cartman, under the name "Central Cinema". After initial good attendances, the volume of cinema viewers fell sharply and the venue closed after a couple of years. The company which had developed the building, the "Thirsk Town Hall and Constitutional Club Buildings Company", got into financial difficulties and was wound up in 1980.

The building subsequently started operating as a community centre operating under the name "Thirsk and Sowerby Town Hall" and became the meeting place of both Thirsk Town Council and Sowerby Parish Council.

An annex was added in 2001 that included an entrance lobby, additional toilets – including facilities for the disabled – meeting rooms, kitchen and storage space.
