= Sowerby, North Yorkshire =

Village and civil parish in North Yorkshire, England

Coordinates: 54.223518°N 1.33926°W

Sowerby
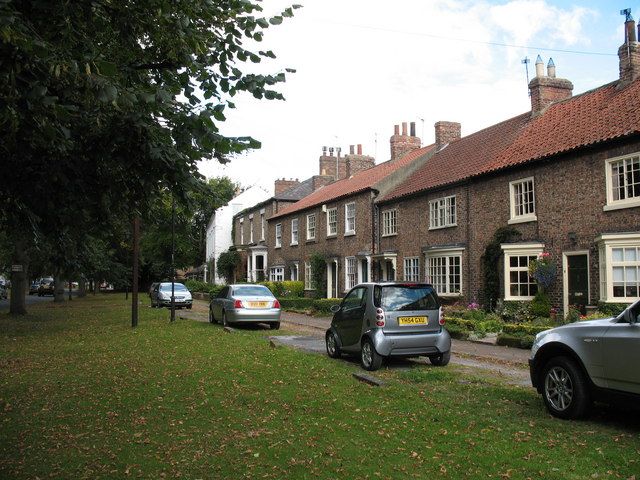
- Front Street Sowerby

- Location within North Yorkshire
- Population: 4,249 (2011 Census)
- OS grid reference: SE431810
- Civil parish: Sowerby
- Unitary authority: North Yorkshire
- Ceremonial county: North Yorkshire
- Region: Yorkshire and the Humber
- Country: England
- Sovereign state: United Kingdom
- Post town: THIRSK
- Postcode district: YO7
- Dialling code: 01845
- Police: North Yorkshire
- Fire: North Yorkshire
- Ambulance: Yorkshire
- UK Parliament: Thirsk and Malton

Sowerby (/ˈsaʊərbi/) is a village, electoral ward and civil parish in North Yorkshire, England immediately south of the neighbouring market town of Thirsk. Although the boundary between the two parishes runs very close to Thirsk town centre, the village retains its own identity and has a separate Parish Council. The author James Herriot lived in the village.

== History ==
The lines of a Roman road can still be seen in the fields to the north and east of the village along the Green Lane and was known as the Saxty Way.

The village is mentioned twice in the Domesday Book as Sorebi in the Yarlestre wapentake. The land was split across both the head manors of Easingwold and Newsham. At the time of the Norman invasion, the manors were split between Earl Morcar and Ligulf, who granted land to Orm. Afterwards, the lands became Crown property. The overlordship was granted to the Mowbray family, who granted land to William Lascelles in 1228. The Lascelles family held their manor until 1602, when it was sold to the Meynell family. The manor has followed the inheritance of the manor at North Kilvington since then. William de Vescy of Kildare held a mesne lordship in the area in the 14th century.

Sowerby has maintained its own parish identity, a sense of place that has waxed and waned due to proximity to a market town. The surviving parish registers date from 1569. During the mid to late 19th century, when wapentakes and hundreds across England and Wales were becoming ill-fitted to administering poor laws, sanitary districts and the administration of justice, some innovations were tried. In the wapentake of Birdforth, some villages near Thirsk were more closely coordinated. Sowerby was ranked as a chapelry, in the parish and union of Thirsk, in the 19th century administration of the wapentake of Birdforth, which is why the parish does not appear on some simplified maps of that time. Eventually the wapentake became inactive as other administrative bodies were implemented, thus Sowerby parish council could be focused on specific needs and issues.

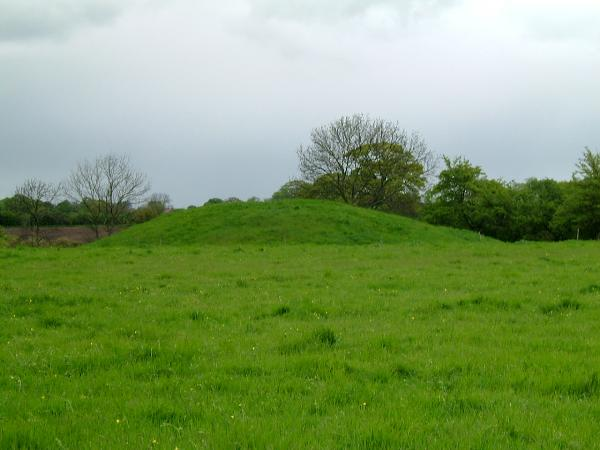
Pudding Pie Hill

The Lascelles (Lassels) family were also credited with building a terrace of houses at the north end of the village, still known as Blue (or Bribery) Terrace, since tenants were expected to vote for the candidate who supported the Tory cause. Historically, and until its abolition in 1974, Sowerby was part of the North Riding of Yorkshire for administrative purpose. At the same time the former Thirsk Rural District Council, of which Sowerby was also a part, was itself abolished.

Sowerby's name comes from the Norse language, in which it means 'Farmstead (by the) muddy/sour ground'.

In the south of the parish at Blakey Lane, Cod Beck is crossed by Blakey Bridge, a 17th-century cart or packhorse bridge and Grade II listed building. Further south, Cod Beck is crossed again on South Moor Lane by Town End Bridge, another 17th-century packhorse bridge, also Grade II Listed.

An artificial mound known as Pudding Pie Hill is on the east bank of Cod Beck, just off Blakey Lane. This was partially excavated in 1855 (by Lady Frankland Russell) and was found to be a sepulchral tumulus of a type known as a bowl barrow. The remains of a Saxon warrior and two other skeletons were discovered, along with cremated bones, various artefacts and coins.

There are five war memorials in Sowerby, one outside St Oswald's Church and two each inside St Oswald's Church and Sowerby Methodist Church, listing 63 local men who died in the First World War and 18 who died in the Second World War.

Planning permission was given in 2012 for the building of a new housing estate of over 1,000 homes, called Sowerby Gateway, at the southern end of the village, resulting in a vastly increased demand for infrastructure and additional services. As a result a new supermarket has been opened as part of the development, along with an Extra Care Home, a new primary school, retail units, a hotel and a new Sports Village. There is also a new industrial/commercial estate being developed immediately adjacent to the residential area to provide additional employment opportunities. The whole development is expected to be completed by 2022. As part of the "planning gain" from the development a new four-way junction was completed in 2019, to replace an existing two-way junction, giving full northbound as well as southbound access to the Thirsk By-pass (A168) dual carriageway.

== Governance ==
The village lies within the Thirsk and Malton UK parliamentary constituency. From 1974 to 2023 it was part of the Hambleton District, it is now administered by the unitary North Yorkshire Council. The first tier of local government covering Sowerby is Sowerby Parish Council, which was first elected following the Local Government Act 1894. Currently the Council has eleven members, who are subject to election every four years. The council meets monthly in Thirsk and Sowerby Town Hall.

== Geography ==
The boundary of the civil parish runs from the A168/A19 junction north to the Moor Lane Stell. From here it runs west, crossing Cod Beck and down Chapel Lane to then follow the A61 as far as Millbank Court. Here it runs south of the housing to cross the East Coast Main Line and then runs south to the boundary of Topcliffe airfield. It then runs east to include most of the small hamlet of Thorpefield and on to Ox Moor plantation. The boundary then follows the southerly route of the Cod Beck as far as, but not including, the hamlet of Westholme. It returns northwards to encompass Sowerby Parks to the A19 at Mile House and then to the A168/A19 junction. Paradise Beck lies wholly within the parish and joins Cod Beck near Sowerby Parks Farm. The centre of the village has an avenue of English lime trees on Front Street, planted to celebrate the jubilee of Queen Victoria in 1887. To the east of the village is a publicly owned open pasture and recreation area known as the Sowerby Flatts. The fields show rig and furrow cultivation marks (i.e. dug with a spade rather than a plough) and the river shows signs of the abandoned project (started c. 1768) to build a canal from the centre of Thirsk to connect with the River Swale.

=== Demography ===
The 1881 UK Census recorded the population as 1,743. The 2001 UK Census recorded the population as 3,699 in 1,529 households. Of the total population, 48.3% were male and 51.7% were female with 2,851 being more than sixteen years old. There were 1,585 dwellings of which 493 were detached. The 2011 UK Census recorded the population as 4,249 in 1,808 households.

== Amenities ==
=== Education ===
The primary schools in the village are Sowerby Primary Academy and All Saints Roman Catholic Primary School. Sowerby Primary Academy was originally opened as a National School in 1872 in a building on Front Street but that building has now been converted into private housing. Its current premises on Topcliffe Road were opened in 1919 to house Thirsk Grammar School. When the Grammar School moved out in 1957 the premises were taken over by Sowerby Junior School. In 1980, following the closure of Sowerby Infants School, which was still located in the former National School on Front Street, the Junior and Infants Schools were merged on the Topcliffe Road site to form Sowerby County Primary School.

Thirsk School and Sixth Form College, the secondary school for the town and the surrounding rural area, is located in Sowerby and has around 1,100 pupils. Its catchment area covers Alanbrooke, All Saints RC, Baldersby St James CE, Carlton Miniott, Dishforth CE, Pickhill CE, Sessay CE, South Kilvington CE, Sowerby, Thirsk and Topcliffe CE Primary Schools and includes some areas served by Knayton CE Primary School. The school was established in 1957 by the then North Riding County Council, as Thirsk Grammar and Modern School, to provide secondary education in Thirsk, Sowerby and the surrounding district. It became Thirsk School in 1970 and is now organised as an 11-18 mixed comprehensive secondary school. From 2004 it was renamed Thirsk School and Sixth Form College.

=== Economy ===
The area's main industry is farming, although many people commute to nearby towns and cities for employment. There is significant employment in retail and in the public sector through Education, the Community Library, the Leisure Centre, local Health and Care Services and the Household Waste Recycling Centre. There are in addition many small and medium-sized businesses. The village also serves the local tourist industry, with holiday cottages, a hotel, bed and breakfast providers and a touring caravan site just to the south of the village.

Amenities include a pub/restaurant, The Crown and Anchor, which is a Grade II Listed building. Also within the parish bounds is the volunteer-run Ritz Cinema in Westgate. It was opened as a picture house in 1912 by Walter Power after converting the building from the original 19th-century Mechanics' Institute. After closing in the early 1970s, it was re-opened in 1983. There was another brief closure between 1994 and 1995. It has a seating capacity of 215.

== Religion ==
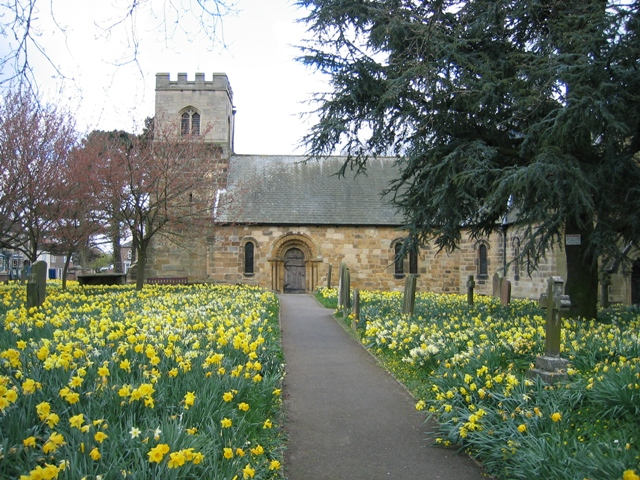
Parish Church of St Oswald

The parish church of St Oswald dates from about 1140. In 1145, Roger de Mowbray gave the care of the chapel at Sowerby to the Prior of Newburgh and historical records show that several members of the Lascelles family are buried here. The structure was rebuilt in 1842 and 1883 to accommodate a growing population. The church is a Grade II* listed building.

A Wesleyan Methodist chapel was built on Front Street in 1865, with a school added in 1871.

== Notable residents ==
- The educationalist, John Rowntree, father of York-based cocoa and chocolate manufacturer Joseph Rowntree, was educated at a Quaker school in the village.
- Labour M.P., member of the National Executive Committee of the Labour Party, trades union activist and National Vice-President of the National Union of Agricultural and Allied Workers, local councillor and magistrate Joan Maynard lived and died here.
- The author James Herriot (pen name of Alf Wight) lived at a house in Topcliffe Road.
- Ralph Bell (died 1733), MP for Thirsk 1710–17.

== See also ==
- Listed buildings in Sowerby, North Yorkshire
