= Three Tuns =

Three Tuns is the name of:

- Three Tuns Brewery, in Bishop's Castle, Shropshire
- Three Tuns, Pennsylvania, a community in the United States
- Three Tuns, Uxbridge, a pub in London
- Three Tuns, Alcester, a pub in Warwickshire
- The Three Tuns, a pub in York
- The Three Tuns, Osmotherley, a pub in North Yorkshire
- The Three Tuns, Thirsk, a hotel in North Yorkshire
