= Thirsk Racecourse =

Horse racing venue in North Yorkshire, England

Coordinates: 54°13′56.16″N 1°21′26.72″W

Thirsk
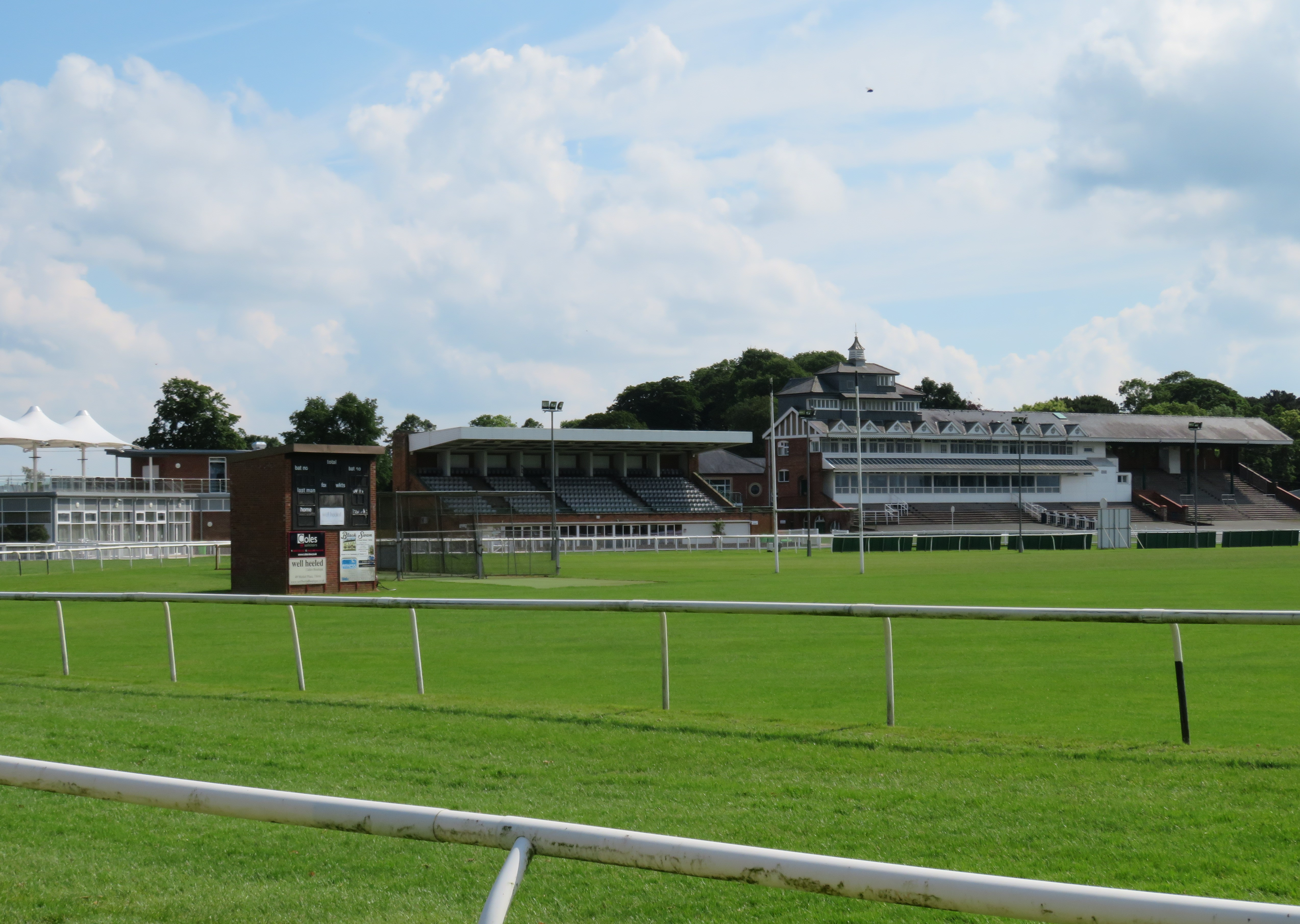
- The Grandstand
- Interactive map of Thirsk
- Location: Thirsk, North Yorkshire
- Owned by: Thirsk Racecourse Ltd.
- Date opened: 1855
- Screened on: Racing TV
- Course type: Flat
- Notable races: Thirsk Hunt Cup; Summer Cup

Thirsk Racecourse is a thoroughbred horse racing venue located in Thirsk, North Yorkshire, England. The course is a left handed oval of about one mile and two furlongs with a half-mile run-in and a six-furlong chute, and solely hosts flat racing. The present course opened in 1855, but racing had taken place on the old course at nearby Hambleton over two centuries earlier.

It would be visited by Edward, Prince of Wales in October 1895 but the course would close for nine years from 1914 to 1923 due to the First World War. It reopened in 1924 with the newly constructed Hambleton Stand, still in use today, and hosted the wartime substitute St Leger in 1940.

It races from April to September with sixteen fixtures being scheduled for 2027.

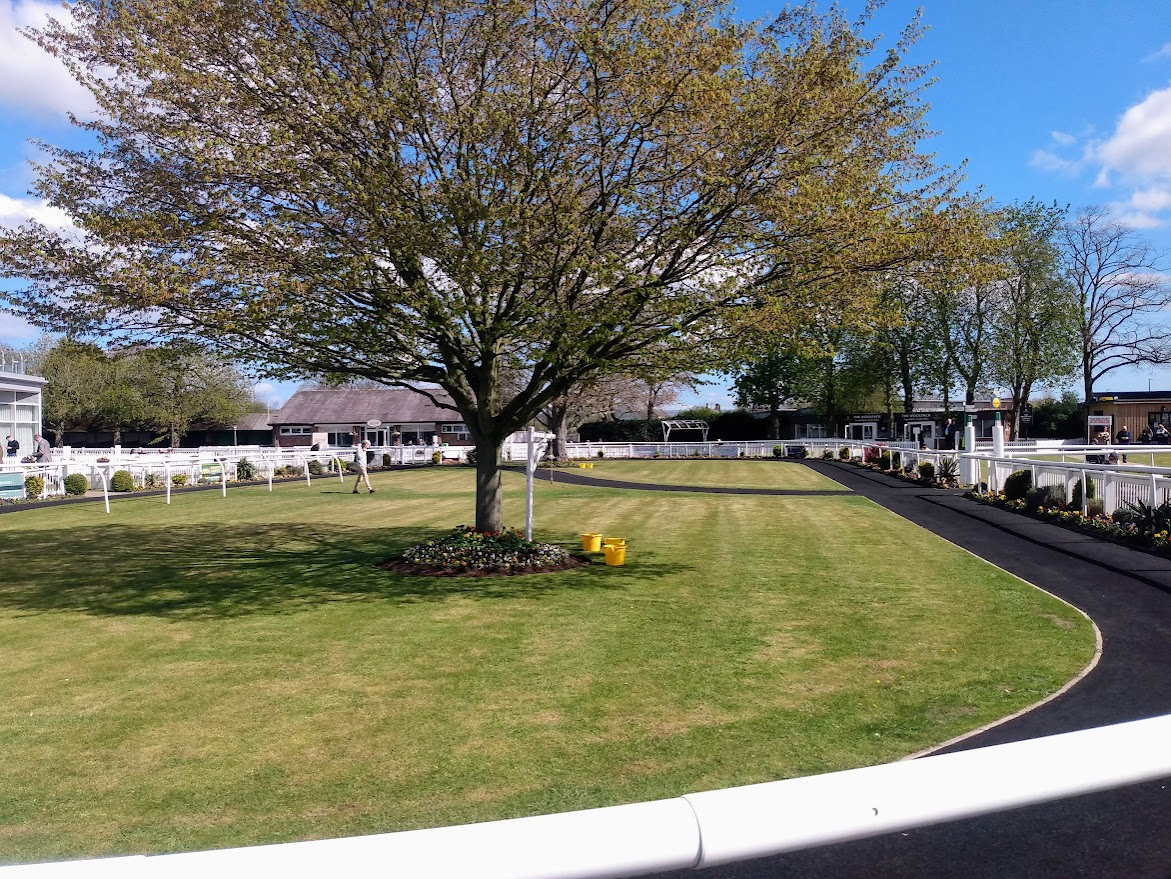
The parade ring

== History ==
Hambleton at the top of Sutton Bank is recorded as having played host to racing as early as 1612. The racecourse was patronised by Queen Anne until her death and was exempted (along with Newmarket and York) from a prohibition of meetings of prize money lower than £50 per race due to its significance in racing. It would also play host to the first two-year-old race in the North in 1779, this age group having previously been prohibited from racing. The racecourse closed in 1811 but its legacy lives on as Kevin Ryan and Bryan Smart still train racehorses in the area.

A committee meeting was held in 1854 at the Golden Fleece Hotel in Thirsk, when Frederick Bell offered his Thirsk Hall estate for horse racing. His offer was accepted and the first meeting was held in March 1855. The Thirsk Hunt Cup would first be run in 1859, although at the time it was run over two miles and four furlongs rather than the one mile it is run over today. Egg Sauce would win, owned and ridden by the 10th Baronet of Scriven. The early meetings were makeshift affairs, with the prize money modest and no accommodation offered, meaning trainers had to pay stabling costs in local inns.

The racecourse was known in the 1860s for political patronage, with the Conservative MP for Thirsk at the time providing a Members' Plate and Liberal politicians also providing support.

The racecourse would grow in the late 19th century, aided by its location near both the Great North Road and East Coast Main Line. The racecourse gained a meeting in October in 1880, joining its April fixture. It would be visited by Edward, Prince of Wales (the future King Edward VII) in October 1895, which saw the construction of the Royal Pavilion in the centre of the course and drew in a large crowd not seen since when Fred Archer rode at the course in 1884.

The racecourse would close from 1914 due to the First World War, but reopened with Sir Loftus Bates in charge in 1924. By this time, the Royal Pavilion had been demolished and the Hambleton Stand built, and this remains in use as the grandstand today.

In 1940, with Doncaster unable to stage racing due to the Second World War, it staged the substitute St Leger, which was won by Turkham, owned by the Aga Khan and ridden by Sir Gordon Richards. Racing would cease shortly after until 1946, although by 1950, it staged four two-day meetings, one in each of April, June, August and September.

Development continued, with two new stands opened in the Silver Ring and Course enclosures in 1967. Both remain today, one being known as the 1967 Stand and the other is the Family Stand. The course's irrigation system was also improved in the early 1970s.

The racecourse would host the 1989 November Handicap due to a collapsed drain causing the abandonment of the St Leger meeting at Doncaster.

The course continues to change, with a new Owners & Trainers building opening in 2018. A 1960s stand was demolished in November 2025 with plans to construct a £5,000,000 three-storey building with a roof terrace, the original stand having been described as life-expired.

Thirsk's clerk of the course was fined £500 in 2025 after having reported a GoingStick reading of 7.6 when it was in fact 8.6, believing the correct figure wasn't reflective of the true going and that it would 'mislead people'.

== Course characteristics ==
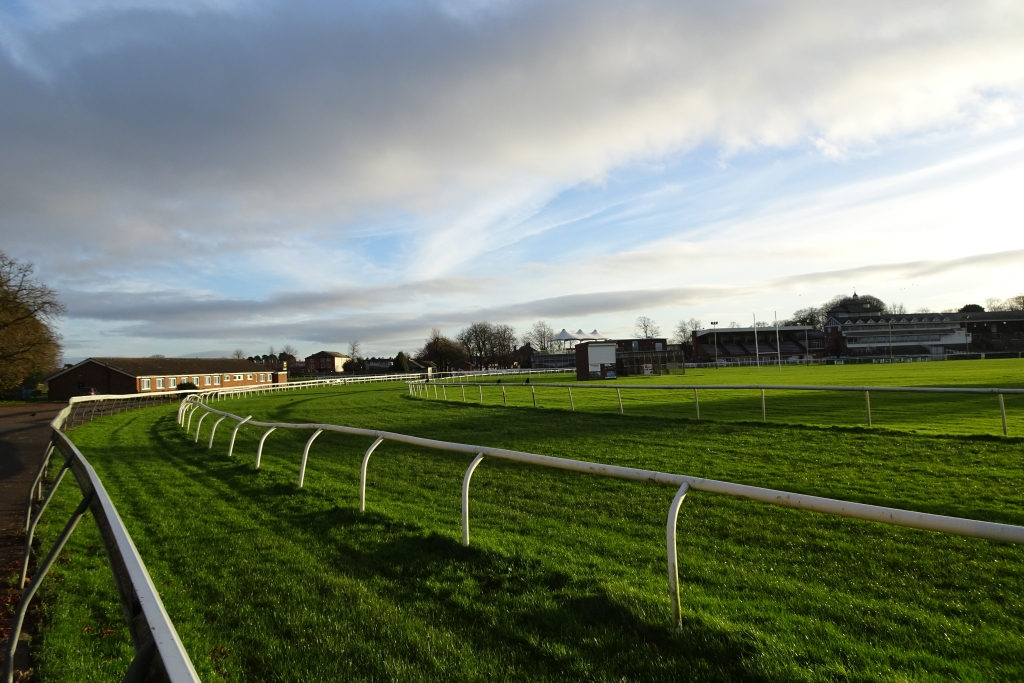
The turn into the back straight past the stable block

The course is a left-handed oval circuit with a circumference of just over one mile and two furlongs and a roughly four-furlong run-in. The straight course is six furlongs in length and is slightly undulating throughout, however the round course is almost totally flat. A ridge on the turn into the home straight requires balance and can catch some horses out, whilst agile and handy types are generally favoured. High-drawn horses are clearly favoured on the straight course when the going is good or faster.

The Thirsk Hunt Cup (run over a distance of one mile) is worth £60,000 as of 2026 and has been won by some high-profile horses, including Farhh in 2012, who would go on to finish second to Frankel in the Juddmonte International at York later that year. Thirsk also stages the Summer Cup over six furlongs in August, which was worth £30,000 in 2025. The Michael Foster Conditions Stakes, run in April over seven furlongs, can also attract some high-quality horses, with Myal the 2026 winner.

Thirsk had a Classic Trial, run in April each year, some winners of which went on to 2000 Guineas glory (the most recent being Tap On Wood in 1979). Starborough, the 1997 winner, would be victorious in the inaugural St James's Palace Stakes. The race was upgraded to Listed status in 2000 but discontinued after 2003 due to consistently attracting small fields, having never attracted a double-figure field in its last ten runnings. The final running only had five runners and won by Royal Dignitary, who wasn't entered in the 2000 Guineas.

== Bibliography ==
- Fairfax-Blakeborough, J. A Short History of Thirsk Racecourse. London: Reid-Hamilton Ltd. ISBN 978-0950139722.
- Gill, James (1975). Racecourses of Great Britain. London: Barrie & Jenkins. ISBN 0-2142-0090-6.
- Halpenny, Marion Rose (1971). British Racing and Racecourses. ISBN 978-0950139722.
