= Thirsk Market Clock =

Clock tower in Thirsk, North Yorkshire, England

Coordinates: 54°13′58″N 1°20′33″W

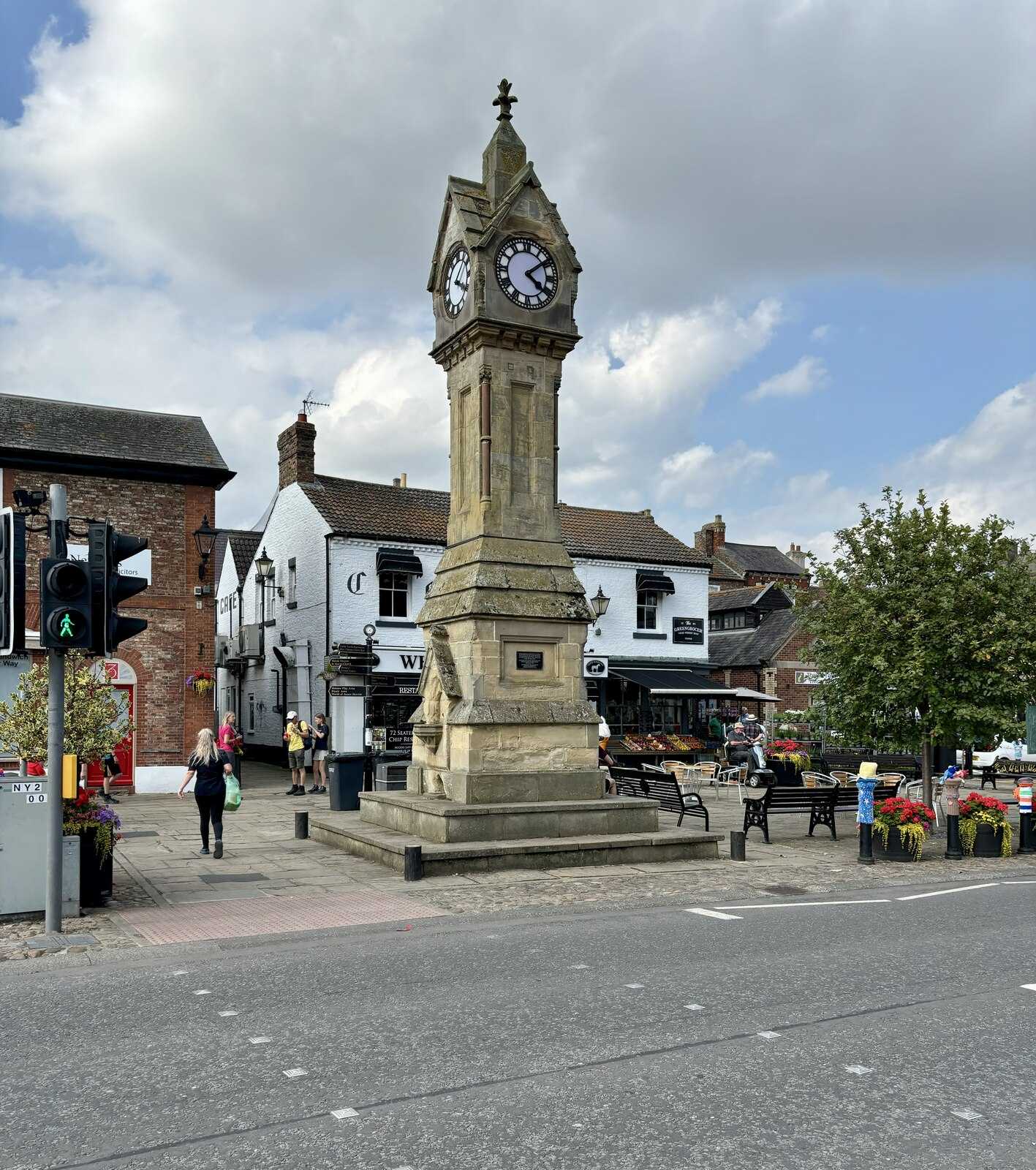
The building, in 2024

Thirsk Market Clock is a historic structure in Thirsk, a town in North Yorkshire, in England.

Thirsk was granted a market charter by 1145, and the market has long been held in the marketplace in the centre of New Thirsk. A market cross was erected in the centre of the marketplace, but it was moved in about 1860 to the grounds of Thirsk Hall. In 1896, a clock tower was instead erected, to commemorate the wedding of Prince George and Princess Victoria Mary. It was restored in 1956, and was grade II listed in 1984. Nikolaus Pevsner is critical of the clock's design, describing it as "a depressing clock towerette".

The tower is built of stone and in the Gothic style. It has a square plan, and stands on a plinth with set-offs. The plinth has a plaque on the south side, a four-centred arched doorway on the north, a quatrefoil on the east, and a water fountain, an arch and a gable on the west side. On the sides of the tower are panels, and on the corners are shafts in pink stone. At the top are four clock faces under gables, and a pinnacle.

== See also ==
- Listed buildings in Thirsk
