= Listed buildings in Thirsk =

Thirsk is a civil parish in the county of North Yorkshire, England. It contains 63 listed buildings that are recorded in the National Heritage List for England. Of these, one is listed at Grade I, the highest of the three grades, one is at Grade II*, the middle grade, and the others are at Grade II, the lowest grade. The parish contains the market town of Thirsk and the surrounding countryside. Most of the listed buildings are houses, cottages and associated structures, shops and offices and, outside the town, farmhouses and farm buildings. The others include churches, public houses and hotels, two bridges, a water pump, a former workhouse, three mileposts, a clock tower and a bank.

== Key ==
Grade	Criteria
I	Buildings of exceptional interest, sometimes considered to be internationally important
II*	Particularly important buildings of more than special interest
II	Buildings of national importance and special interest

== Buildings ==
Name and location	Photograph	Date	Notes	Grade
St Mary's Church; 54.23486°N 1.34595°W		c. 1430	The church, which is in Perpendicular style, was restored in 1877 by G. E. Street. It is built in sandstone with lead roofs, and has trefoil-pierced embattled parapets, pinnacles, and gargoyles. The church consists of a nave with a clerestory, north and south aisles, a two-storey south porch, a chancel with a crypt, and a west tower. The tower has three stages, west buttresses, a large three-light west window above which is a niche containing a statue, a south clock face, and three-light bell openings. The east window has five lights.	I
60 and 62 Market Place; 54.23267°N 1.34116°W		16th century (probable)	A shop and former public house, it has a timber framed core, encased in brick and rendered, and has a steep pantile roof. There is one storey and attics, and an L-shaped plan, with a main range of three bays and a projecting cross-wing on the right. The ground floor contains shopfronts and a doorway, and above are three gabled half-dormers with decorative bargeboards. Inside, there is exposed timber framing and some wattle and daub infill.	II
The Cross Keys Public House; 54.23368°N 1.34491°W		16th century (probable)	The public house and the private house on the left have a timber framed core, they are encased in reddish-brown brick, and have a stone plinth at the front, large stones at the base of the north wall, a string course, dentilled eaves, and a pantile roof. There are two storeys and four bays. On the front are two doorways with hoods on brackets, the right more elaborate. Above the left doorway is a blind panel, and the windows are sashes with segmental heads. A section of cruck is visible on the north wall.	II
The Golden Fleece Hotel; 54.23235°N 1.34214°W		16th century (probable)	The building is in two parts. The older part has a timber framed core, encased in brown brick on a plinth, and a slate roof. There are three storeys and two bays. The central round-headed doorway has pilasters, a dentilled cornice and a large hood. This is flanked by canted bay windows, the middle floor contains two large tripartite sash windows with moulded surrounds and segmental heads, and on the top floor are three sash windows. To the left is a later taller bay containing a three-storey canted bay window with arched sash windows. To the left is a carriage entry, and inside the older part is exposed timber framing.	II
15 Ingramgate; 54.23325°N 1.33778°W	—	Late 16th century (probable)	The house has a timber framed core, with brick at the front and left return, dentilled eaves, and a pantile roof with a parapet on the east gable. There are two storeys and two bays and a rear outshut. On the front are sash windows and a doorway to the right, and at the rear is exposed timber framing. There is also exposed timber framing internally, and a patch of wattle and daub infill.	II
Former Blacksmiths Arms Public House; 54.23306°N 1.34162°W		c. 1600 or earlier	The public house has a timber framed core, it is encased in brick, and has a slate roof. There are two storeys and two bays. The central doorway is flanked by canted bay windows, and on the upper floor are two sash windows under gables. Inside, there is exposed timber framing and upper crucks.	II
26 and 28 Kirkgate; 54.23356°N 1.34483°W	—	16th or early 17th century	A house divided into two houses, with a timber framed core, later encased and rendered. There are two low storeys and four bays. On the front are two recessed doorways and 20th-century windows, and the left bay contains a carriageway. Inside, there is exposed timber framing, including a section of close studding.	II
45 Market Place; 54.23289°N 1.34328°W	—	17th century (probable)	A house, later a shop, in roughcast brick with a pantile roof. There are two low storeys and two bays. On the front is a 20th-century shopfront and a passageway to the left, and the upper floor contains horizontally sliding sash windows with moulded surrounds.	II
The Black Bull Public House; 54.23320°N 1.34205°W		17th century (probable)	The public house has a timber framed core, it is enclosed in brick and rendered, and has a hipped pantile roof. There are two storeys and three bays. On the front is a doorway with a hood on brackets, flanked by canted bay windows. On the left is a passageway, and the upper floor contains sash windows.	II
The Three Tuns Hotel; 54.23261°N 1.34141°W		17th century (possible)	The oldest part of the hotel is in the rear wing, since when it has been considerably enlarged. It is in colourwashed brick, the ground floor rendered and channelled, with a cornice, a floor band and a hipped slate roof. There are three storeys and seven bays. In the centre is a porch with two columns and an entablature, and the windows are sashes with a round-headed stair window at the rear. The rear wing is in reddish-brown brick with a pantile roof, and has two storeys, a string course and a doorway.	II
61 and 63 Market Place; 54.23302°N 1.34259°W	—	Late 17th century	A group of shops in brick, rendered and colourwashed at the front, with a floor band, quoins, a cornice, a parapet, and a steep slate roof. There are two storeys and four bays. The ground floor contains shopfronts, and on the upper floor are sash windows with stucco heads and keystones.	II
Thirsk Hall; 54.23425°N 1.34599°W		1720	A manor house that was extended and heightened by John Carr in 1771–73. It is built in reddish-brown brick on a plinth with stone dressings, chamfered quoins, floor bands, a cornice, and a shallow hipped slate roof. It consists of a main block of three storeys and five bays, slightly recessed side wings with two storeys and three bays, and a lower two-storey wing further recessed to the left. Steps lead up to the central doorway that has a moulded architrave, a radial fanlight, and a pediment on two consoles. The windows are sashes with moulded surrounds and gauged flat brick arches. At the rear is a cast iron verandah.	II*
Spa House; 54.24328°N 1.35001°W	—	Early 18th century	The house is in reddish-brown brick with dentilled eaves and a pantile roof. There are two storeys and three bays, a lower wing on the left, and a rear outshut. The central doorway has a hood on brackets and is flanked by canted bay windows. The windows on the upper floor are sashes, and there is a horizontally sliding sash window on the right return.	II
18–22 Finkle Street; 54.23297°N 1.34041°W	—	18th century	A row of three cottages, later shops, on a curved corner site. They are in reddish-brown brick, the middle shop colourwashed, with dentilled eaves and pantile roofs. There are two storeys and each shop has two bays. The left shop has a floor band, a shopfront on the ground floor and sash windows above. The middle shop has a shopfront, sash windows and a flat-roofed dormer, and the right shop has a floor band, a shop window and a doorway with a keystone to the right. Further to the right and on the upper floor are horizontally sliding sashes with keystones.	II
7–15 Kirkgate; 54.23302°N 1.34436°W	—	18th century	A row of cottages, all but one converted into shops. They are in reddish-brown brick with dentilled eaves and pantile roofs. No. 13 has a floor band and a central doorway, to its left is a modern window, and the others are sashess. The other former cottages have shopfronts of various types, and on the upper floor most windows are sashes, and there are some blank panels.	II
31 Kirkgate; 54.23353°N 1.34516°W	—	18th century	The house is in pinkish-brown brick, with a floor band, dentilled eaves and a pantile roof. There are two storeys and three bays. The doorway on the left bay has an oblong fanlight and a flat brick arch, and above it is a blind panel, On the ground floor are 20th-century windows, and the upper floor has horizontally sliding sash windows. All the openings have flat brick arches and keystones.	II
33 Kirkgate; 54.23362°N 1.34522°W	—	18th century	The house is in reddish-brown brick with a floor band, dentilled eaves and a pantile roof. There are two storeys and three bays. On the left is a passageway, and to its right is a doorway with pilasters, an oblong fanlight and a hood on brackets. The windows are sashes with channelled stucco heads and keystones.	II
35 Kirkgate; 54.23369°N 1.34534°W	—	18th century	The house is in pinkish-brown brick, with string courses, and a Welsh slate roof with stone verges and kneelers. There are three storeys and four bays. On the left is a carriageway with pilasters and a hood, and to its right is a doorway with pilasters, an oblong fanlight, panelled reveals, a soffit and a dentilled cornice. The windows are sashes with stucco heads and sills.	II
21–27 Market Place; 54.23263°N 1.34351°W	—	18th century	A block of houses, later shops, on a corner site, in rendered brick, with dentilled eaves and pantile roofs. There are two low storeys, three bays on the north front, and two on the west front. The ground floor contains varied shopfronts, and on the upper floor are sash windows and a blind panel.	II
Abel Grange Farmhouse; 54.25166°N 1.38435°W	—	18th century	The farmhouse is in reddish-brown brick on a plinth, with stone dressings, dentilled eaves and a pantile roof. There are two storeys and three bays, and a lower single-bay extension to the right. The doorway is in the centre, and the windows are sashes with flat brick arches.	II
Former Royal Oak Hotel; 54.23235°N 1.34352°W	—	18th century	The hotel, later used for other purposes, is in brick, the front rendered with rustication and panelling, and a pantile roof. There are three storeys and five bays, and a two-storey rear wing. The central doorway has reeded pilasters and a triangular pediment. It is flanked by shop windows, and on the left is a carriageway. The upper floors contain sash windows, and on the rear wing is a Venetian window.	II
Outbuilding with dovecote, Thirsk Hall; 54.23383°N 1.34594°W		18th century	The building, to the south of the hall, is in reddish-brown brick with a slate roof. The outbuilding has two storeys and three bays, and the dovecote has three storeys and a hipped roof with a weathervane. The outbuilding contains sash windows and blocked windows, and the dovecote has a carriage entry.	II
Stables, Thirsk Hall; 54.23390°N 1.34562°W		18th century	The stable building is in reddish-brown brick, with stone dressings, chamfered quoins, a floor band, moulded eaves, and a hipped stone slate roof. There are two storeys and seven bays. The middle bay projects slightly, and contains a blank round-arched panel on the ground floor and a circular window above. On the outer bays are round-arched entrances with rusticated surrounds, and later windows. The left return, facing the road, has a blank round-arched panel on the ground floor and a blank circular panel above.	II
Walls north of Thirsk Hall; 54.23508°N 1.34695°W	—	18th century	The walls to the north of the hall are in reddish-brown brick with stone coping. They start to the north of the hall with a rusticated stone pier, and have buttressing piers at intervals.	II
Thirsk Hall Cottages; 54.23487°N 1.34667°W		18th century	A pair of cottages, the right one added later, in reddish-brown brick, the left with cogged eaves, and both with pantile roofs. There are two storeys, each cottage has two bays, and the right cottage is slightly taller. In the centre of each cottage is a doorway with pilasters, moulded architraves, and dentilled triangular pediments. The windows are sashes with moulded surrounds.	II
29 Kirkgate; 54.23345°N 1.34510°W	—	Late 18th century	The house is in reddish-brown brick with a pantile roof. There are three storeys and two bays. On the left is a doorway with a moulded architrave and a triangular pediment. The windows are sashes with gauged brick heads and stucco sills.	II
Wall south of Thirsk Hall; 54.23416°N 1.34568°W	—	Late 18th century	The wall of the forecourt to the south of the hall is in reddish-brown brick with stone coping. It is about 6 feet (1.8 m) in height, and ends in a rusticated stone pier of similar height.	II
Woodhouse Field Farmhouse and farm building 54.24417°N 1.38817°W		Late 18th century (probable)	The farmhouse is in reddish-brown brick, with a string course, cogged eaves, and a pantile roof. There are two storeys and four bays. The doorway has a plain surround, and the windows are sashes with shallow segmental brick arches. Attached to the north is a single-storey outbuilding containing carriage entrances.	II
Mill Bridge; 54.23432°N 1.34194°W		1789	The bridge carries Millgate (A61 road) over Cod Beck, and was designed by John Carr. It is in sandstone and consists of three segmental arches. The bridge has semicircular cutwaters, a band, and a coped parapet, and has cylindrical domed piers on the north side.	II
New Bridge; 54.23291°N 1.33921°W		1799	The bridge carries a road over Cod Beck. It is in stone and consists of three arches. The bridge has chamfered cutwaters, a band, coped parapets, and cylindrical domed piers.	II
Quaker meeting house and cottage 54.23346°N 1.34473°W		1799	The building is in pinkish-brown brick, with a Welsh slate roof, grey ridge tiles, and rendered gable verges. There is a single storey and six bays, the western bay forming the cottage. On the front is a lean-to porch, and the windows are sashes, some horizontally sliding.	II
13, 13A, 15 and 17 Castlegate; 54.23196°N 1.34443°W	—	18th or early 19th century	A row of two shops and two houses in brown brick, with a floor band, and a pantile roof with a raised stone verge and kneeler on the south gable. There are two storeys and five bays. On the ground floor are a 19th-century shopfront, a square bay window, three doorways with oblong fanlights, and hoods on brackets, and two windows. The windows on both floors are sashes with keystones.	II
19 and 21 Finkle Street; 54.23315°N 1.34031°W		18th to early 19th century	A pair of houses in rendered brick with quoins and a slate roof. There are two storeys and four bays. On the ground floor are two doorways with oblong fanlights and triangular pediments. The windows on the outer bays of the ground floor are slightly bowed with dentilled cases. The other windows on the front are sashes with keystones, and at the rear is an arched stair window.	II
14–18 Kirkgate; 54.23321°N 1.34433°W		18th to early 19th century	A pair of cottages, the right cottage converted into a museum, in brown brick, that have a pantile roof with three courses of stone slate at the eaves. There are two storeys and six bays. On the front are three doorways, one inserted later, and on the right bay is a canted bay window. Most of the other windows are sashes with channelled stucco heads, there is one inserted window and one blind panel.	II
10 and 12 Market Place; 54.23204°N 1.34355°W		Late 18th or early 19th century	Two houses later used for other purposes, they are in brown brick with a slate roof. There are three storeys and four bays. The ground floor contains 19th-century shopfronts with pilasters, and above are sash windows with stucco sills and heads.	II
46–52 Market Place; 54.23245°N 1.34168°W	—	Late 18th or early 19th century	A row of four houses, most converted into shops, in brown brick, with a string course. The right house has a slate roof, and the others have a pantile roof with three rows of stone slate. There are three storeys and nine bays. At the right end is a carriageway, at the left end is a doorway with hood on brackets and a sash window, and between them are shopfronts. On the upper floors are sash windows with stuccoed heads.	II
8–16 Millgate; 54.23351°N 1.34200°W	—	Late 18th to early 19th century	A row of houses, later shops, in brown brick, some with dentilled eaves, with a pantile roof, and two storeys. On the ground floor is a 19th-century shopfront with reeded pilasters, and to the left is a square bay window 20th-century shopfronts, a doorway and a passage entry. The upper floor has four canted bay windows and three sash windows.	II
8 St James' Green; 54.23506°N 1.34190°W	—	Late 18th or early 19th century	The house is in brown brick with a cogged eaves cornice and a pantile roof. There are two storeys and two bays. The central doorway has a divided oblong fanlight, it is flanked by canted bay windows with dentilled cornices and reeded angles, and on the upper floor are sash windows.	II
35, 36 and 37 St James' Green; 54.23528°N 1.34116°W	—	Late 18th to early 19th century	Three, later two, houses in brown brick, with pantile roofs and stone coped gables. The left house is taller, and both houses have three storeys and three bays. Each house has a doorway with pilasters, a radial fanlight, and an open pediment, and in the right bay is a carriageway. The windows are sashes with wedge lintels, those in the left house also with keystones.	II
Grizzlefield House and walls 54.2407°N 1.31321°W	—	Late 18th to early 19th century	The house is in red brick on a plinth, with sandstone dressings, string courses, a moulded eaves band, and a Welsh slate roof. There are two storeys and three bays, and a later recessed single-bay extension to the east. In the centre is a doorway with a sandstone surround, fluted pilasters and an open pediment. The windows are sashes, those on the ground floor with flat brick arches, and on the upper floor with lintels and projecting keystones. At the rear is a round-arched stair window. On the west side is a stone-coped screen wall and a lean-to outbuilding.	II
Woodhill Grange Farmhouse, farm buildings and wall 54.24606°N 1.37903°W		18th or early 19th century	The farmhouse is in reddish-brown brick with a pantile roof. There are two storeys and four bays. The doorway has an oblong fanlight, and the windows are sashes, those in the ground floor with shallow segmental-arched heads and gauged brick arches. Attached on each side of the house are farm buildings, and along the front of the garden is a brown brick wall ramped up to meet the outbuildings.	II
21 and 23 Kirkgate; 54.23323°N 1.34488°W		Early 19th century	A pair of houses, the right house converted into a museum, in brown brick on a stone plinth, with sill bands, and a pantile roof. There are three storeys and each house has two bays. On the left bay of each house is a doorway in a semicircular-headed recess, with pilasters, an entablature, a frieze, a cornice, and a semicircular fanlight with a moulded archivolt. The windows are sashes under shallow segmental-arched heads, some of them tripartite.	II
42–52 Kirkgate; 54.23394°N 1.34514°W	—	Early 19th century	A row of cottages in brown brick, with a string course, cogged eaves, a Welsh slate roof, and two storeys. Each cottage has a doorway, some with a fanlight, and the windows are sashes with red brick heads and keystones. Towards the right is a carriageway, and on the north end wall is a round-headed sash window.	II
2–6 Market Place and 10 Castlegate; 54.23190°N 1.34403°W	—	Early 19th century	Houses, later shops, on a corner site, in brown brick, with a stucco floor band, and a Welsh slate roof. There are three storeys, one bay on Market Place, two on Castlegate, and a canted bay between them. The ground floor contains shopfronts, on the middle floor on Castlegate is a canted bay window, and the other windows are sashes with splayed stucco heads and sills.	II
65 Market Place; 54.23309°N 1.34243°W	—	Early 19th century	A house, later a shop and at one time the Cooperative Store, it is in brown brick, with a modillion eaves cornice, and a roof with kneelers. There are three storeys and three bays. The ground floor contains a modern shopfront, and on the upper floors are sash windows with gauged red brick heads.	II
38 St James' Green; 54.23521°N 1.34108°W	—	Early 19th century	The house is in brown brick and has a slate roof. There are two storeys and one bay. The ground floor contains a doorway with an oblong fanlight, to its left is a canted bay window, to its right is a segmental-headed passage entry, and on the upper floor is a sash window.	II
The Red Bear Public House; 54.23291°N 1.34316°W		Early 19th century	The public house is in brown brick with a slate roof. There are three storeys and two bays. The ground floor contains a modern front and passageway to the right, and on the upper floors are sash windows with moulded surrounds.	II
The Royal Public House; 54.23295°N 1.34280°W		Early 19th century	The public house is in whitewashed brick with a slate roof. There are three storeys and two bays. The central doorway has a hood on brackets, it is flanked by canted bay windows, and on the upper floors are sash windows.	II
Water pump 54.23419°N 1.34490°W	—	1832	The water pump at the rear of No. 52 Kirkgate is in iron, in wooden casing, and has a long iron handle. Above the handle is an initialled and dated plaque.	II
Manor Farmhouse; 54.23937°N 1.37425°W	—	Early to mid-19th century	The farmhouse is in reddish-brown brick with a pantile roof. There are two storeys and three bays, and flanking extensions. The central doorway has an oblong fanlight, and the windows are sashes with shallow segmental brick arches.	II
1 Sutton Road; 54.23367°N 1.33559°W		1838	Originally a workhouse, later converted into flats, it is in brown brick with a sill band, stuccoed entablature at the eaves, and a slate roof. There are two storeys, a central range of five bays, flanked by projecting single-bay wings with pilasters and hipped roofs. The central doorway has a radial fanlight and a hood on brackets. The ground floor windows are sashes, on the central range with round-arched heads, and on the wings they have segmental relieving arches. The upper floor contains replacement single hung windows.	II
1 Ingramgate; 54.23311°N 1.33876°W	—	19th century	The house is in rendered and colourwashed brick, with a cornice, a parapet and a hipped slate roof. There are two storeys and five bays, with a pediment containing a circular window over the middle three bays. The doorway has pilasters, a rectangular fanlight, and a hood on corbels. The windows are sashes, and on the right return is a bay window and a flat-roofed dormer.	II
40 Market Place; 54.23233°N 1.34231°W	—	19th century	A house, later a shop, in rendered brick, with an eaves cornice and a slate roof. There are three storeys and three bays. The ground floor contains a shopfront with slender columns, segmental-arched windows, and a fascia with a bracket on the left. Above are sash windows and gabled dormers.	II
Former Office of the Board of Guardians; 54.23283°N 1.34008°W		19th century	Originally the office of the Board of Guardians, at one time the office of a building society, and later used for other purposes, the building is in brown brick, with a stuccoed cornice on the front, and a hipped Welsh slate roof. There are two storeys and three bays, the wider middle bay slightly recessed. On the centre is a square bay window, over which is a panel and a tripartite segmental-headed window. On the left bay is a doorway with a semicircular fanlight, the right bay contains a round-headed window, and on the upper floor of both bays are round-arched recesses. At the rear are two sash windows.	II
Milepost near Plumpbank Farm; 54.23493°N 1.31860°W	—	19th century	The milepost is on the south side of Sutton Road (A170 road). It is in cast iron and has a triangular plan and a sloping top. On the top is inscribed "NRYCC", the left face has the distance to Thirsk, and the right face the distance to Helmsley.	II
Milepost opposite No. 15 Ingramgate; 54.23315°N 1.33780°W		19th century	The milepost on Ingramgate (A61 road) is in cast iron, and has a triangular plan and a sloping top. On the top is inscribed the distance to London. On the left face is the distance to Easingwold, on the right face is"THIRSK" and on the lower parts of both faces are designs in relief.	II
Milepost outside Burniston; 54.23939°N 1.34193°W		19th century|	The milepost on the east side of Stockton Road (A61 road) is in cast iron, and has a triangular plan and a sloping top. On the top is inscribed the distance to London. On the left face is the distance to Thirsk, and on the right face the distance to Yarm.	II
7, 9 and 11 Ingramgate; 54.23319°N 1.33816°W		1857	A row of three cottages designed by E. B. Lamb, they are in brown brick on a plinth, with red brick dressings, dentilled floor and eaves bands, and a pantile roof. There are two storeys and a front with three gables, the middle one recessed. To the left of the recessed gable is a doorway with a chamfered surround and a fanlight, and a single-light window above. The other windows on the front are cross-mullions. On each return is a central doorway and cross-casement windows.	II
Market Clock; 54.23274°N 1.34243°W		1896	The freestanding clock tower in Market Place is in stone and in Gothic style. The tower has a square plan, and stands on a plinth with set-offs. The plinth has a plaque on the south side, a four-centred arched doorway on the north, a quatrefoil on the east, and a water fountain, an arch and a gable on the west side. On the sides of the tower are panels, and on the corners are shafts in pink stone. At the top are four clock faces under gables, and a pinnacle.	II
Former Midland Bank; 54.23320°N 1.34176°W		1900	The bank is in sandstone with a tile roof. There are two storeys and attics with gabled dormers, and two bays. On the front are two doorways with hoods, the right more elaborate with columns. The windows are mullioned and transomed, those on the upper floor with pilasters, a sill band, and cornices, and between them is a plaque with a carving in relief.	II
10 and 12 Kirkgate; 54.23313°N 1.34418°W	—	Undated	A cottage, later divided into two, it is in brown brick with dentilled eaves and a pantile roof. There are two storeys and two bays. The left bay contains a bow window and a later window above. On the right bay is a square bay window and a horizontally sliding sash window above, and between them is a doorway with a dentilled cornice.	II
Thirsk Lodge Farmhouse and wall 54.24161°N 1.36954°W		Undated	The farmhouse is in brown brick, the main part has a slate roof, and the wing has a pantile roof. There are two storeys, a main block of three bays, and a recessed single-bay wing on the right. The central doorway has an oblong fanlight, and the windows are sashes with flat brick arches. Attached to the rear of the house is a wall in brown brick with brick coping.	II
Outbuilding, Thirsk Lodge Farmhouse; 54.24179°N 1.36994°W		Undated	The farm building, to the northwest of the farm, is in brown brick with dentilled eaves, and a pantile roof, polygonal at the south end. There is a single story, it contains one window on the street front, and has a semicircular south end.	II
