= Thirsk Quaker Meeting House =

Building in Thirsk, North Yorkshire, England

Coordinates: 54°14′01″N 1°20′41″W

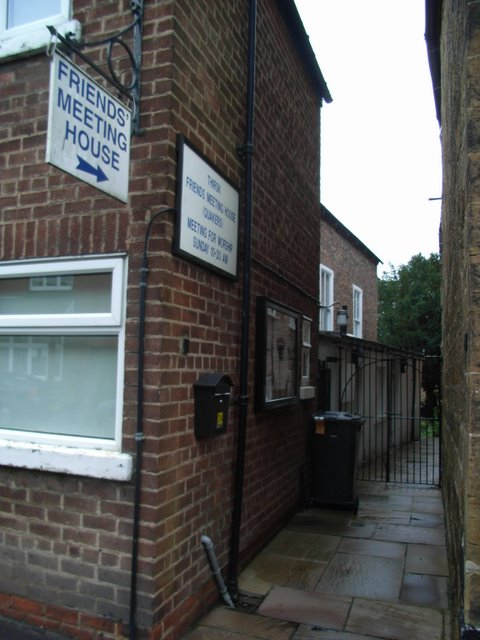
The building, in 2008

Thirsk Quaker Meeting House is a historic building in Thirsk, a town in North Yorkshire, in England.

In 1647, Seekers based in Thirsk purchased a house on Kirkgate. Many of the Seekers joined the growing Quaker movement, and in 1689 the Quakers registered the house for their worship. By the late 18th century, the house was in poor repair, and it was demolished with a purpose-built meeting house constructed on the site in 1799. At the time, it was a simple structure with a main room, a women's gallery screened off at one end, and an elders' gallery at the other end; and a loft above. By 1876, the meeting rooms had been combined, and the loft had been removed. The western part of the building was at some point converted into a cottage, and this was improved in 1954.

In 1957, the local meeting ceased, but it was revived in 1973. The building was then altered, to add a meeting room, children's room, and hallway. In 2006, there was further work under John Baily, to provide toilets and a kitchen. The building has been grade II listed since 1984.

The building is constructed of pinkish-brown brick, with a Welsh slate roof, grey ridge tiles, and rendered gable verges. The meeting house has a single storey and six bays, the western bay forming a two-storey cottage. On the front is a lean-to porch, and the windows are sashes, some horizontally sliding. Inside are early 20th-century panelling, and 19th-century wooden benches.

== See also ==
- Listed buildings in Thirsk
