= Black Bull, Thirsk =

Pub in Thirsk, North Yorkshire, England

Coordinates: 54°13′59″N 1°20′31″W

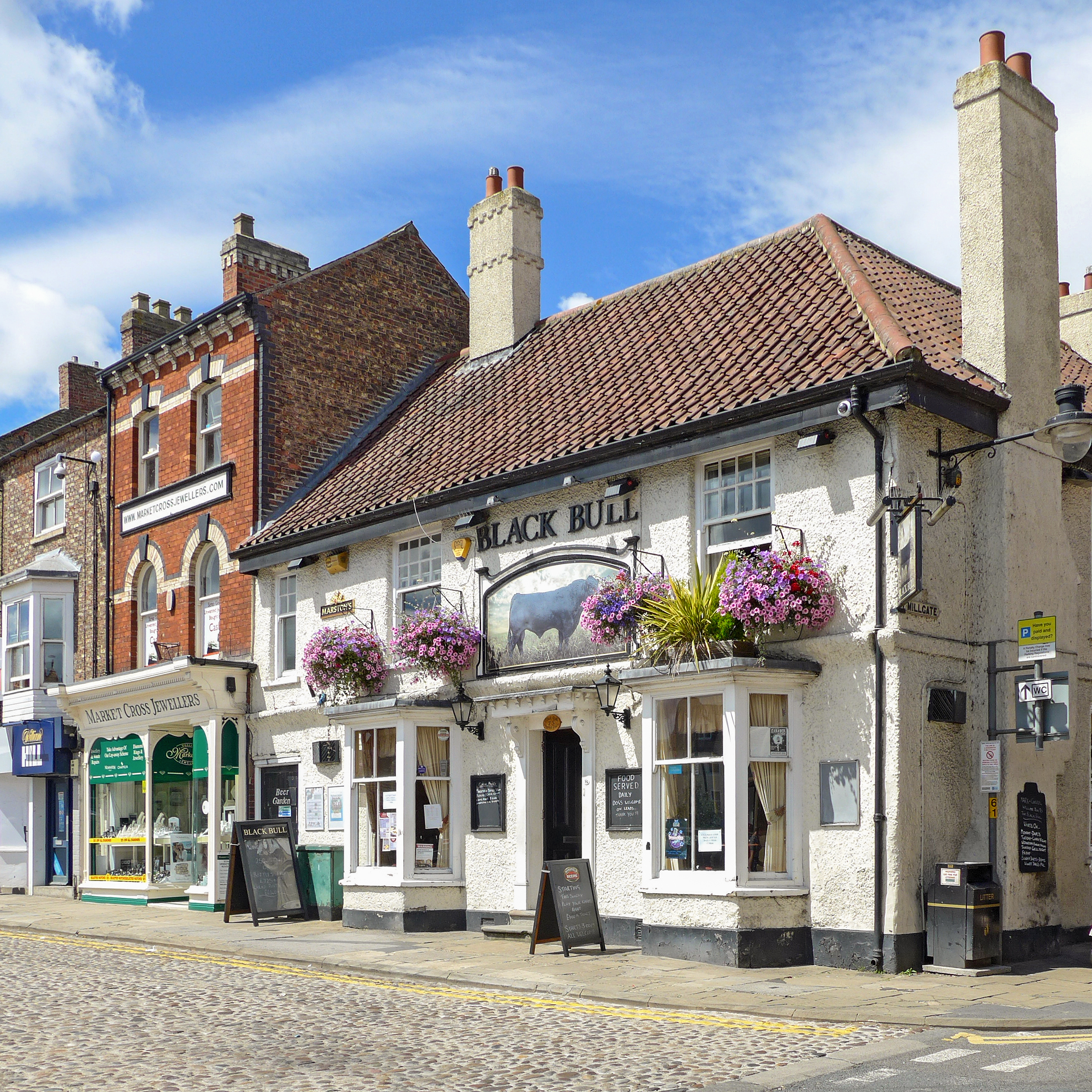
The pub, in 2016

The Black Bull is a historic pub in Thirsk, a town in North Yorkshire, in England.

The pub lies on the town's market place, and was probably built in the 17th century. Bay windows were added, and the doorway was replaced, in the 19th century. The building was grade II listed in 1984. By 2022, the pub was owned by Admiral Taverns, who refurbished it at a cost of £189,000. At the time, it had a main bar, a snug, and a beer garden.

The public house has a timber framed core, it is enclosed in brick and rendered, and has a hipped pantile roof. It has two storeys and is three bays wide. On the front is a doorway with a hood on brackets, flanked by canted bay windows. On the left is a passageway, and the upper floor contains sash windows.

== See also ==
- Listed buildings in Thirsk
