= The Three Tuns, Thirsk =

Hotel in Thirsk, North Yorkshire, England

Coordinates: 54°13′57″N 1°20′29″W

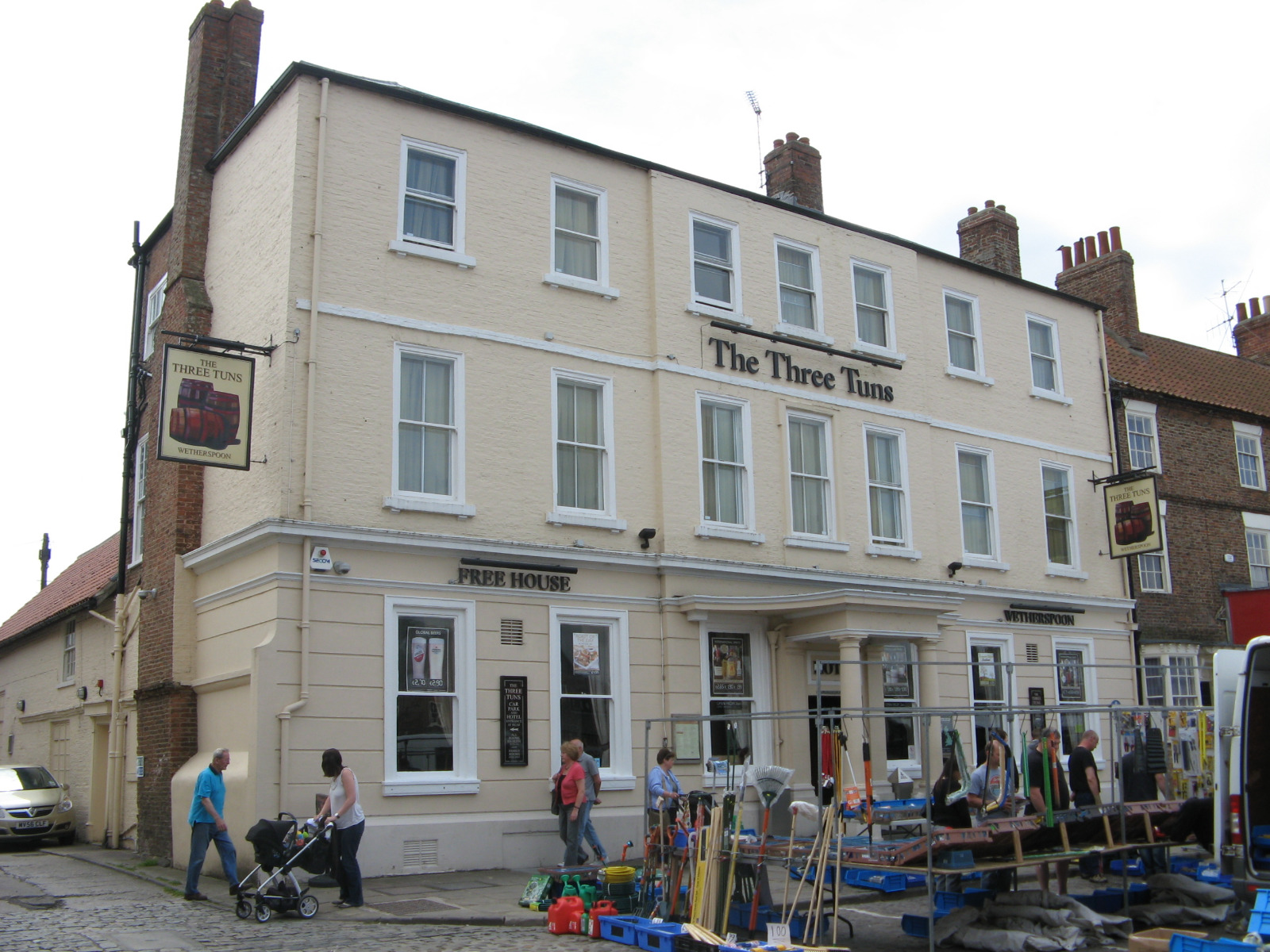
The hotel, in 2011

The Three Tuns is a hotel in Thirsk, a town in North Yorkshire, in England.

The building may have originally been the dower house of the Bell family, which was built in 1698. In 1740, it was converted into a coaching inn, and much of the current building dates from this period, with only the core of the rear wing being older. For many years, it was the town's only coaching inn, but around 1815 much of its business was transferred to the Golden Fleece. Guests at the hotel have included William Wordsworth, while James Herriot regularly drank in its bar. The building was grade II listed in 1952. The hotel and its bar are currently owned by Wetherspoons.

The hotel is built of colourwashed brick, the ground floor rendered and channelled, with a cornice, a floor band and a hipped slate roof. It has three storeys and seven bays. In the centre is a porch with two columns and an entablature, and the windows are sashes with a round-headed stair window at the rear. The rear wing is in reddish-brown brick with a pantile roof, and has two storeys, a string course and a doorway. Inside is a staircase dating from about 1698, and at its foot, a pair of 18th-century Ionic columns supporting a ceiling beam.

== See also ==
- Listed buildings in Thirsk
