= St Mary's Church, Thirsk =

Church of St Mary
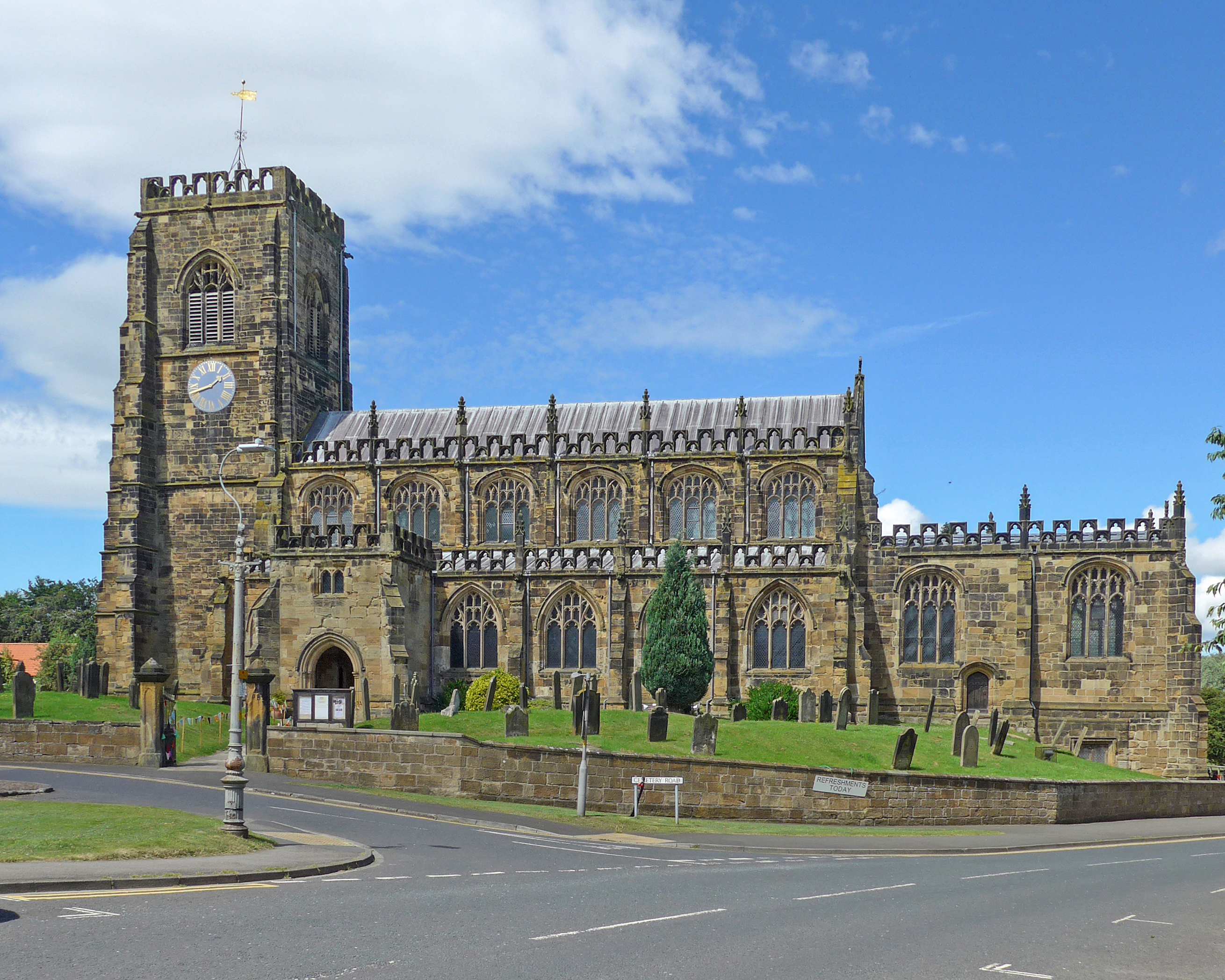
- Church of St Mary
- 54.2349°N 1.3458°W
- OS grid reference: SE 42737 82326
- Location: Kirkgate, Thirsk, North Yorkshire, YO7 1PR
- Country: England
- Denomination: Church of England
- Churchmanship: Central
- Website: Parish website

History
- Status: Active
- Dedication: St Mary Magdalene

Architecture
- Functional status: Parish church
- Style: Perpendicular Gothic
- Years built: 1430–1480

Administration
- Diocese: Diocese of York
- Archdeaconry: Archdeaconry of Cleveland
- Deanery: Mowbray
- Parish: Thirsk

Clergy
- Rector: The Revd Mary Rolls

St Mary's Church, Thirsk is a Church of England parish church in Thirsk, North Yorkshire. The church is a grade I listed building.

== History ==
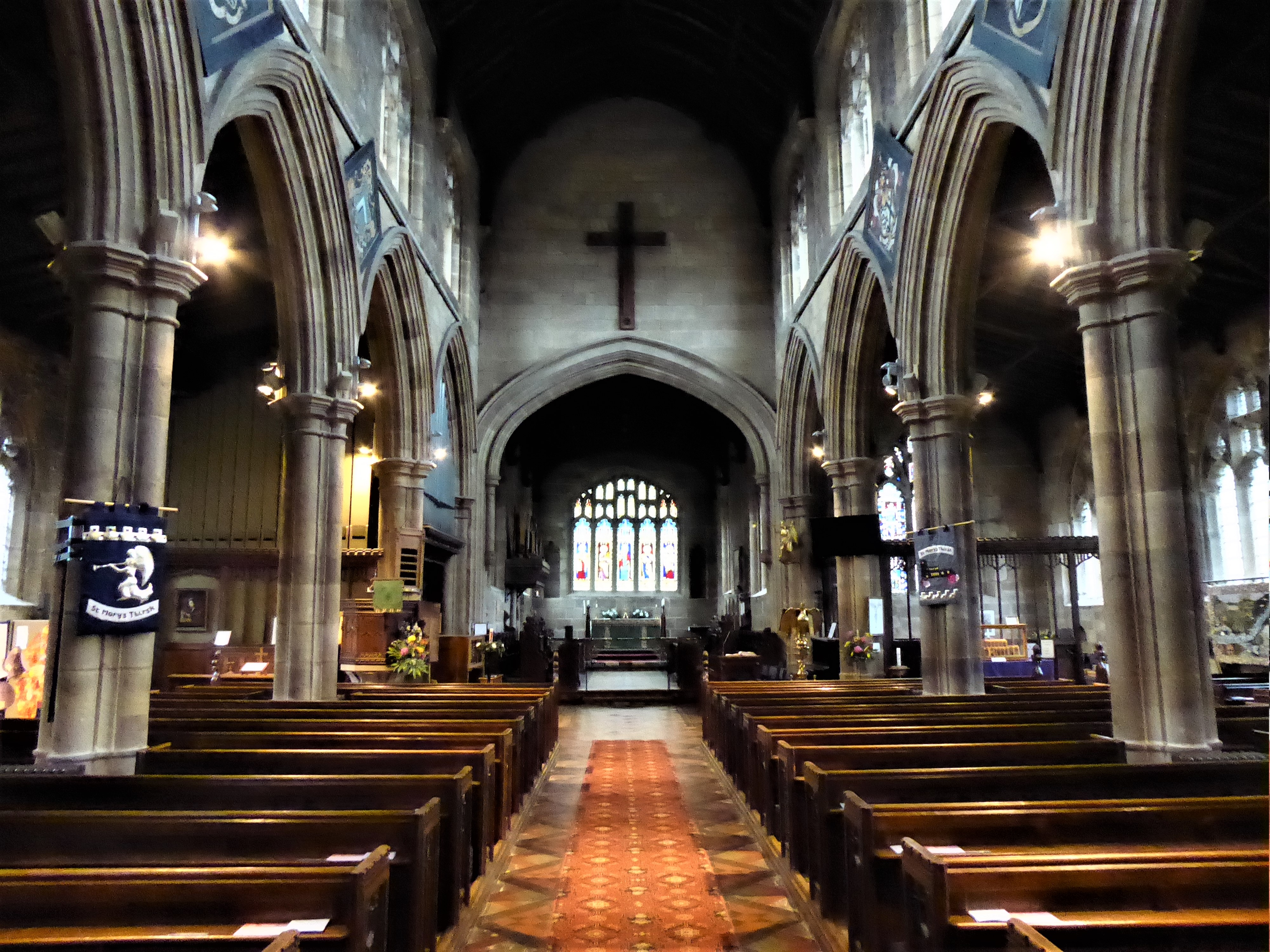
Interior

The church dates from the 15th century.

The living was augmented in 1811 with £1,200 (equivalent to £83,801 in 2025) and in 1824 with another £400 (equivalent to £37,968 in 2025) both by parliamentary grant by lot. In 1834 there was another grant of £400 (equivalent to £44,951 in 2025) to meet the benefaction of a stipend of £30 per year by Archbishop Edward Venables-Vernon-Harcourt as a perpetual augmentation.

In 1857 the porch on the south side was rebuilt.

It was restored in 1877 by George Edmund Street. During the restoration of 1877 it was reported that the East window of the south aisle contained the royal arms of England quartered with France, with the motto “Dieu et mon droit.” There were also the arms of the Ascough family, those of Mowbray, of Sir James Strangways, and Elizabeth his wife, and members of their family.

The church re-opened on 2 October 1877.

=== Recent history ===
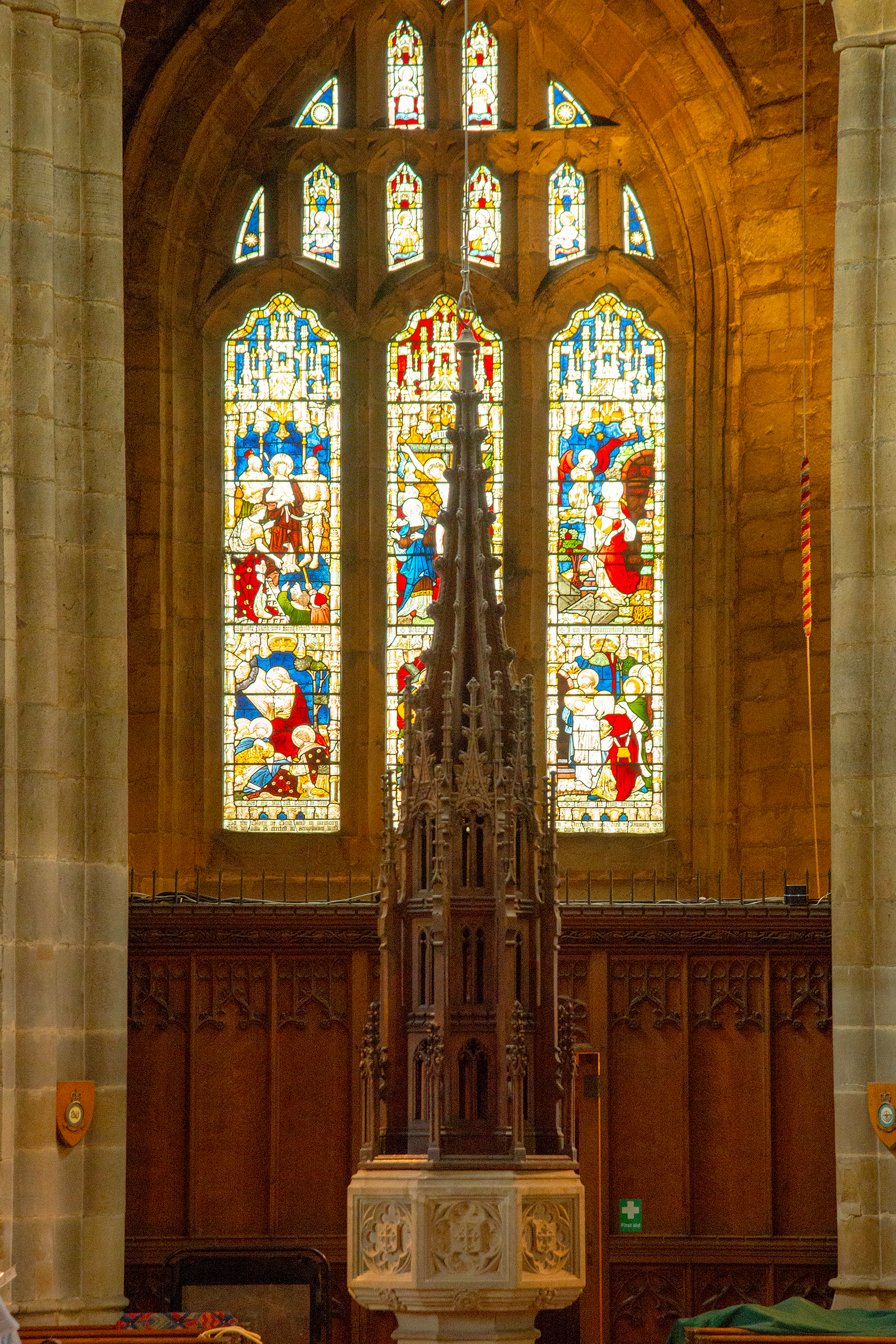
Stained glass window at the back of St. Mary's church, Thirsk

In November 2016, the church was covered with handmade poppies as part of the Remembrance Day celebrations in Thirsk. The Thirsk Yarnbombers created more than 40,000 knitted or crocheted poppies to decorate the town, with the main display consisting of a "river" of poppies flowing from the top of St Mary's Church, down the side and then across the wall of the church's cemetery.

Best known as the renowned author James Herriot, "Alf" Wight married Joan Anderson (who appears as Helen in the Herriot books, movies and TV series) at St Marys on 5 November 1941.

== Parish status ==
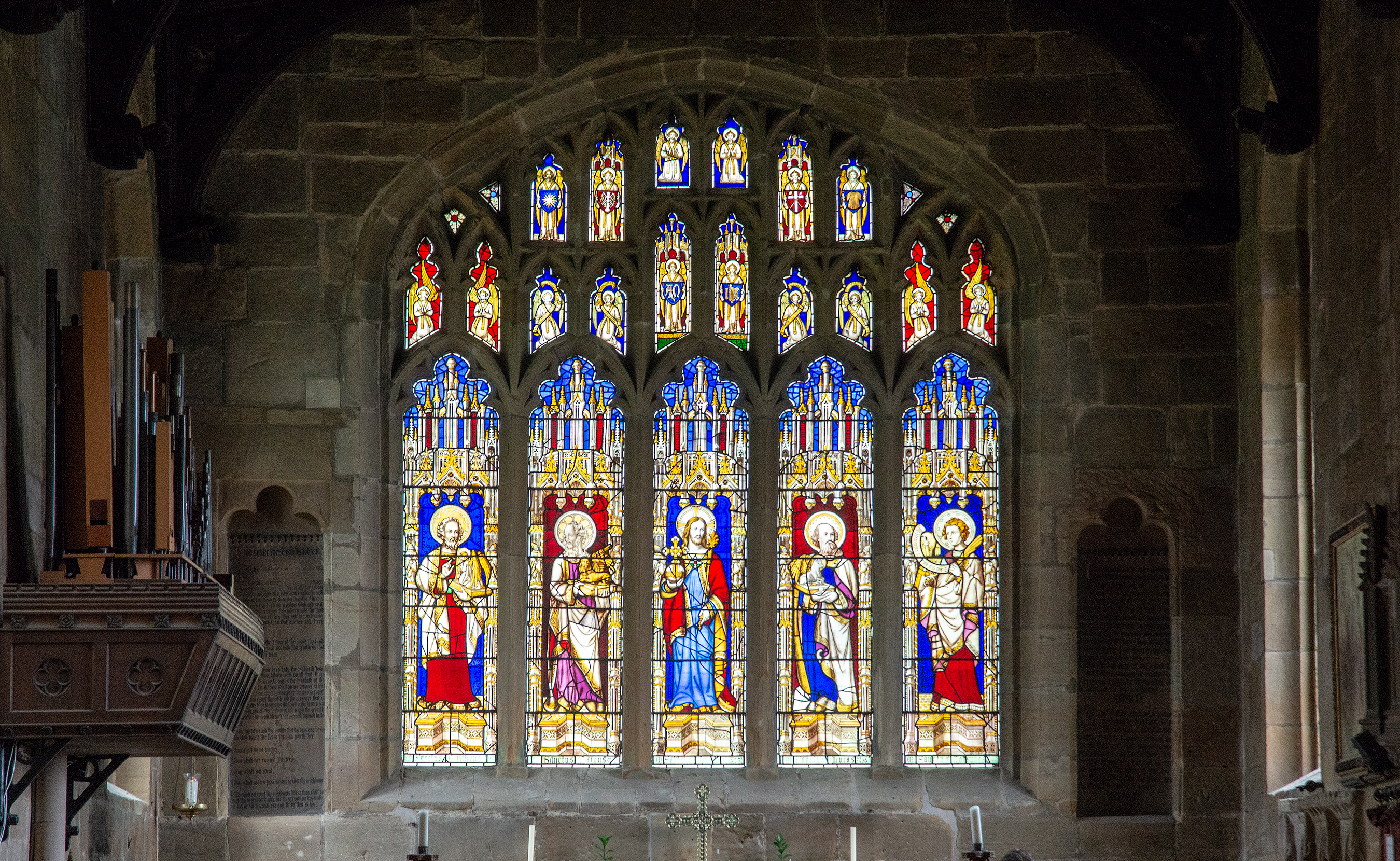
Stained glass above the altar

St Mary's is one of four churches of the Benefice of Thirsk. The others are:

- St Wilfrid's Church, South Kilvington
- St Lawrence's Church, Carlton Miniott
- St Leonard's Church, Sandhutton

== Organ ==
A pipe organ was built in 1813 by Andrew Wood. It has been subsequently restored and enlarged. A specification of the organ can be found on the National Pipe Organ Register.

== Bells ==
In 1859 the tower had four bells. The largest dating as far back as 1410 was reputed to have been brought from Fountains Abbey. The other three were cast in 1729, 1775 and 1805. Between 1857 and 1864 two new bells were added to the peal and two more in 1871. Since the peal was augmented to eight, then only the sixth bell has been recast in 1926.

== See also ==
- Grade I listed buildings in North Yorkshire (district)
- Listed buildings in Thirsk
