= Three Tuns, Alcester =

Pub in Alcester, Stratford-on-Avon, Warwickshire, England

Coordinates: 52°12′50.8″N 1°52′12.7″W

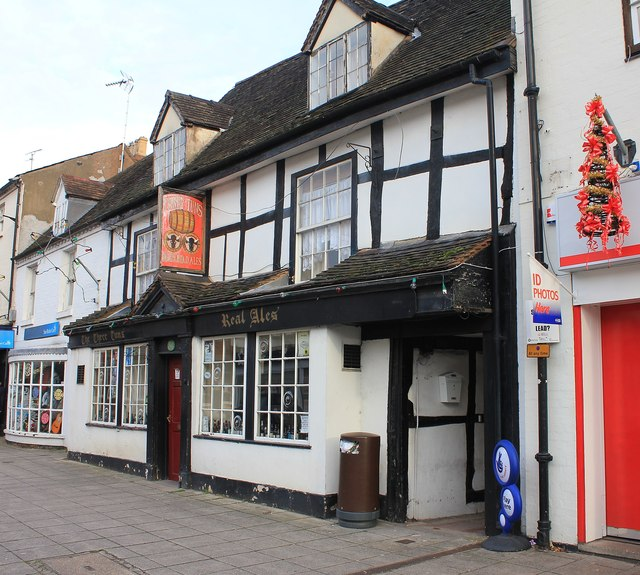
Pictured in 2012

The Three Tuns is a public house in Alcester, Warwickshire, England. Originally built as a private house in the 17th century it is of timber-framed construction with a 19th-century build-out into the street at ground-floor level. A passage provides access to a rear yard containing an associated dwelling, Talbot Cottage. The pub and cottage are protected as grade II listed buildings. The pub suffered a fire in April 2021 that has left it unused and without a roof since.

== Description and early history ==
The Three Tuns is sited at number 34 High Street in Alcester. It was built as a house in the 17th century but is now a pub, with flat above, and a separate cottage to the rear. The three tuns is a traditional pub name and sign with origins in the medieval era when inns hung three barrels on their exterior to denote their status. It remains in use on the coat of arms of the Worshipful Company of Brewers.

The main structure is of two storeys, with an attic. It is of timber-framed construction with plaster infill and L-shaped in plan; the roof is tiled and the chimney stacks are in brick. Three of the chimney shafts date to the 17th century and one to the 19th century. The ground floor has a build-out extending into the street that was constructed in the 19th century. The front entrance is set in a wooden doorcase with a pediment and pilasters, decorated with incisions. The top of the build-out is decorated with a dentil-detailed cornice. The ground floor at the front elevation has shop-front style windows; there are two windows on the first floor, that protrude into the lean-to style roof of the build-out. The attic floor had two dormer windows. To the right side of the front elevation a passage provides access to the yard to the rear, it is gated and along its length allows a view of the building's timber framing which can also be seen on the front and rear elevations. The interior also has exposed timbers framing and ceiling beams, including bressummers.

The cottage, built in the 19th century, is known as Talbot Cottage. It is of rendered brick construction with a cornice in brick with dentil detailing. The windows date to the 20th century. The complex of pub, cottage and flat were granted statutory protection by Historic England on 1 February 1967. They are currently protected as a single grade II listed building, under the name Talbot Cottage. The pub won the Campaign for Real Ale's Shakespeare regional pub of the year award in 2020.

== 2021 fire ==
The pub and flat suffered a "ferocious" fire from around 2:30 pm on 17 April 2021. The landlords, who had operated the pub since 2015, lived in the flat and were en-route to a holiday when the fire broke out. The pub had yet to re-open following the COVID-19 lockdowns.

Seven fire crews from the Warwickshire, Hereford and Worcestershire and West Midlands fire and rescue services responded to the blaze and several roads were closed to facilitate firefighting. The interior of the building was destroyed and much of the roof collapsed. Firefighters were able to prevent the blaze from spreading to adjacent structures, though some suffered smoke and water damage rendering them temporarily uninhabitable. The cause of the fire is unknown and a full investigation was not able to be carried out by the fire service due to the building's poor structural condition.

After the fire little work was carried out except for the erection of some scaffolding and the building left open to the elements. Stratford-on-Avon District Council took enforcement action against the owner, believed to reside in Birmingham, by January 2022. Some initial clean-up works were carried out in August 2022 but there has been little other progress on site and the building remains without a roof.
