= Thirsk Hall =

Manor house in Thirsk, England

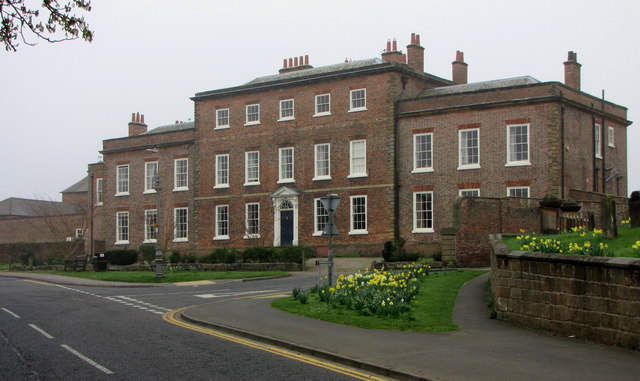

- Location within North Yorkshire

General information
- Type: Manor House
- Location: Kirkgate, Thirsk, North Yorkshire
- Coordinates: 54°14′03″N 1°20′45″W
- Construction started: 1720
- Completed: 1723
- Renovated: 1770
- Owner: Bell family

Renovating team
- Architect: John Carr

Website
- www.thirskhall.com

Listed Building – Grade II*
- Designated: 30 April 1952
- Reference no.: 1151319

Thirsk Hall is a Grade II* listed manor house in Thirsk, North Yorkshire, dating from 1720. The house has been held by the Bell family for c. 300 years, and since 2021 also hosts a sculpture park.

== History ==
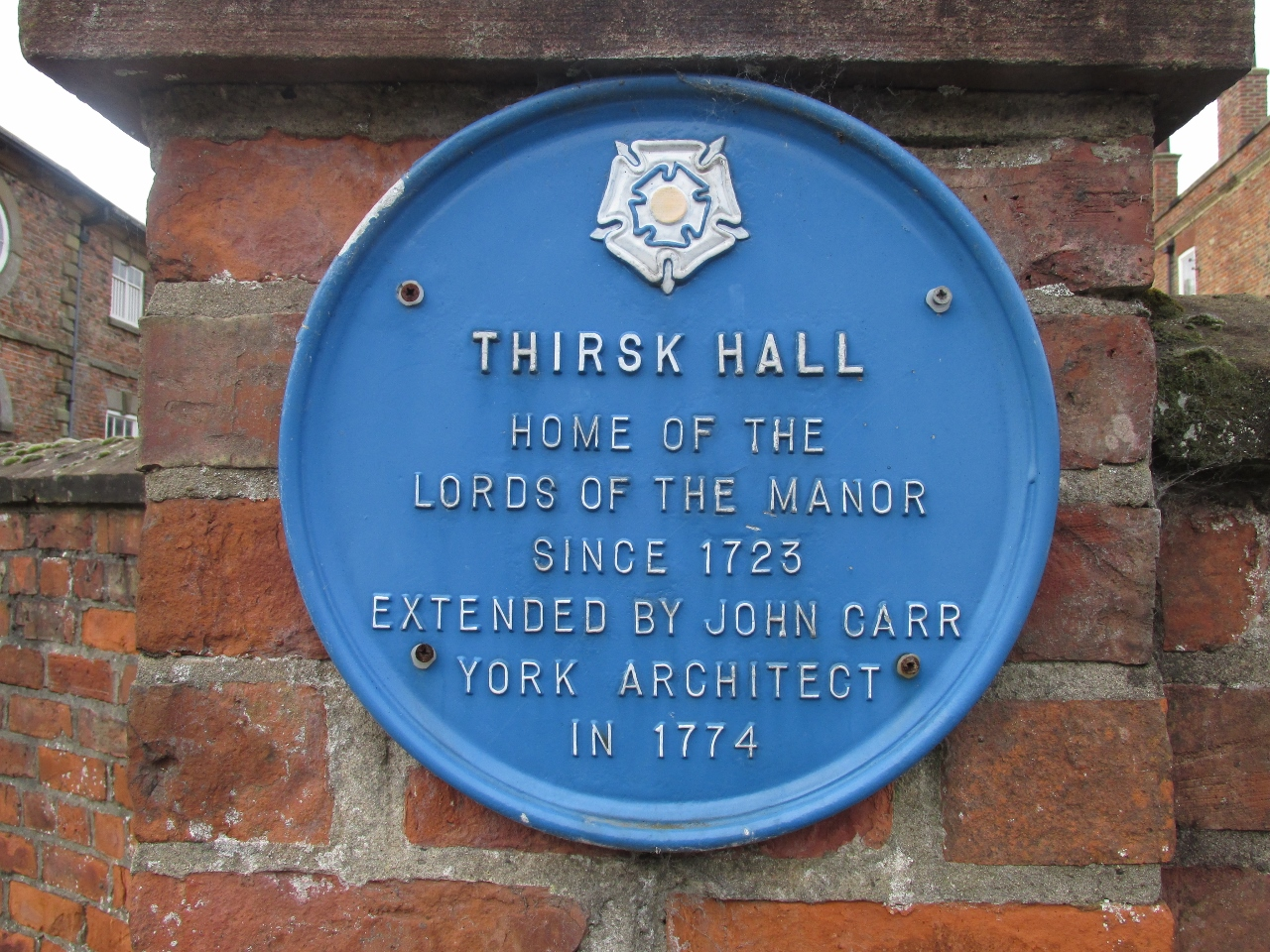
Thirsk Hall Blue Plaque

In 1722/23 the member of parliament Ralph Bell bought the manor of Thirsk for the sum of £6,300 (equivalent to £1,205,376 in 2025) from the 10th Earl of Derby. At the time the hall was constructed it had two storeys and five bays. Bell lived in the then new-built home, Thirsk Hall, located on Kirkgate next to St Mary's Church. Following his death in 1733 Bell left his estate to his nephew Ralph Consett, who then changed his surname to Bell. Some years later a descendent, also named Ralph Bell, married Ann Conyers. Conyers, who desired a dining room, financed an extension to the hall in 1770. The Palladian architect John Carr was employed to add a third floor and two wings. The house was furnished by Gillows, and the artist Thomas Gainsborough painted portraits of both Bell and Conyers. The ceiling of the ground floor room in the right wing, designed by Carr, has been described as "very fine". Thirsk Hall has 20 acres of grounds comprising gardens, parkland, and woodland.

As of 2022 the hall continues to be owned by the Bell family. Daisy Bell, eldest daughter of John Bell, inherited the property after being successful in a card game at aged 11, following her fathers eschewing of primogeniture.

== Sculpture Park ==
In the summer of 2021 the Thirsk Hall Sculpture Park, set in the grounds, was opened to the public. It has showcased the work of both up and coming and established artists, including Michael Lyons and Zak Ové. The park had 3,000 visitors in its first year. In 2023 the park featured the work of stone sculptor Emily Young. An outbuilding of the hall, named Gallery One, features an indoor art gallery.

== See also ==
- Grade II* listed buildings in North Yorkshire (district)
- Listed buildings in Thirsk
- John Bell (Liberal politician) – British Liberal politician, born 1809
- Yorkshire Sculpture Park – Art gallery in West Yorkshire, England
- Zillah Bell Contemporary Art – Art gallery in Thirsk, England
