= Golden Fleece, Thirsk =

Building in Thirsk, North Yorkshire, England

Coordinates: 54°13′56″N 1°20′32″W

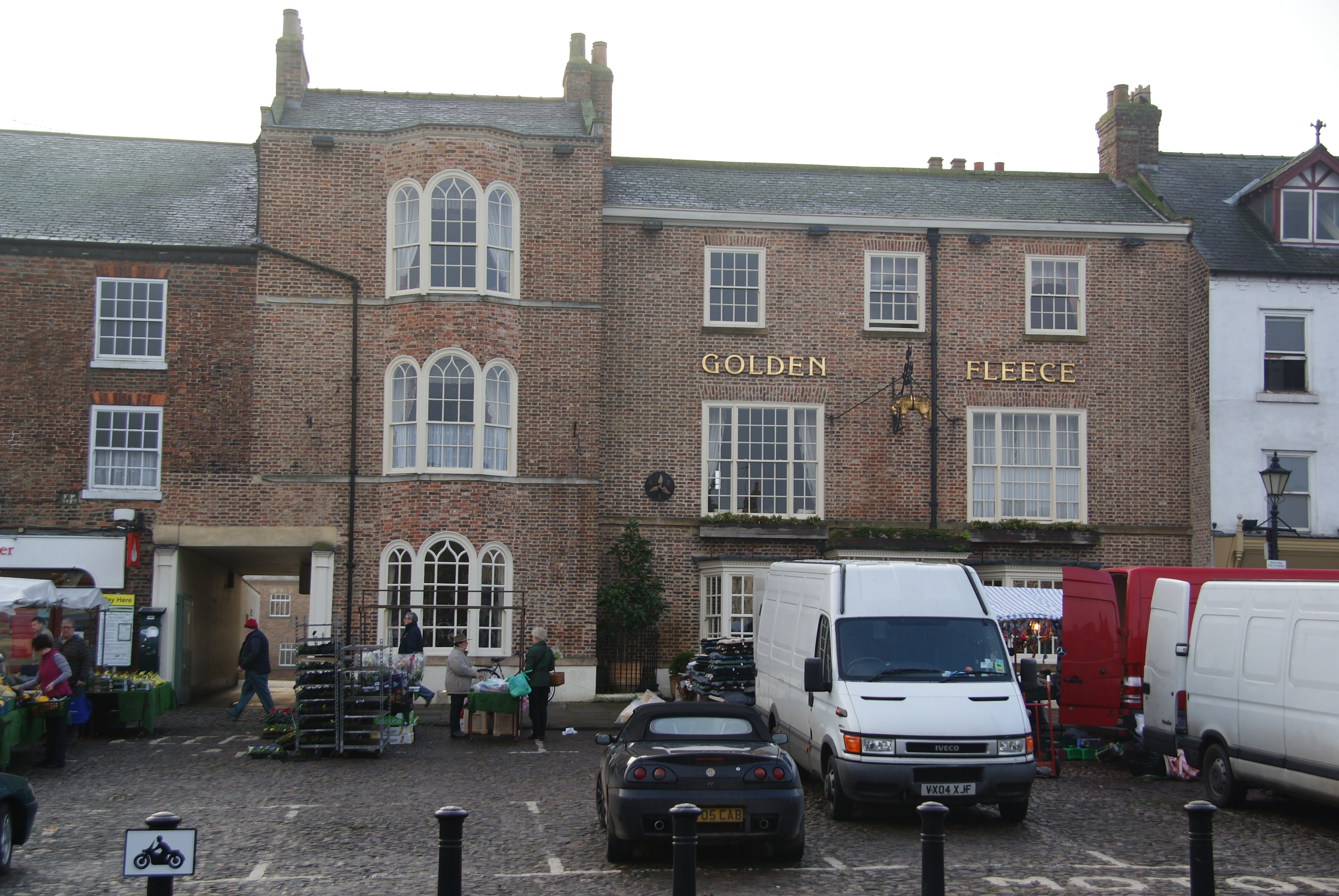
The building, in 2011

The Golden Fleece is a historic building in Thirsk, a town in North Yorkshire, in England.

The hotel lies on the south side of the town's market place. The older part of the building was constructed as a hall house, probably in the 16th century. It was altered in the 17th and 18th centuries, and an additional storey was added around 1820. The newer part was constructed around 1800. Around 1815, the property became a coaching inn named "The Fleece", with stabling for 60 horses. The building was grade II listed in 1952. The hotel was renovated in 2017 at a cost of £1 million, the work including conversion of the bar into a private dining room, the former dining room into a bar, the banqueting suite into a restaurant, and the provision of a coffee shop and outdoor dining area with a pizza oven.

The older part of the building has a timber framed core, encased in brown brick on a plinth, and a slate roof. There are three storeys and two bays. The central round-headed doorway has pilasters, a dentilled cornice and a large hood. This flanked by canted bay windows, the middle floor contains two large tripartite sash windows with moulded surrounds and segmental heads, and on the top floor are three sash windows. To the left is a later taller bay containing a three-storey canted bay window with arched sash windows. To the left is a carriage entry, and inside the older part is exposed timber framing.

== See also ==
- Listed buildings in Thirsk
