= Anglican Diocese of the Rocky Mountains =

Anglican diocese in the United States

Location
- Ecclesiastical province: Anglican Church in North America

Statistics
- Parishes: 41 (2025)
- Members: 5,532 (2025)

Information
- Rite: Anglican

Current leadership
- Bishop: Ken Ross
- Suffragan: Ben Fischer, Billy Waters

Website
- rockymountainanglican.org

The Anglican Diocese of the Rocky Mountains is a diocese of the Anglican Church in North America. Its congregations are located in the American states of Colorado, Wyoming, Montana, Arizona, Idaho, Missouri, California, Oregon, Washington, Ohio, South Dakota, Minnesota, New Jersey and Hawaii. The diocese's first bishop is Ken Ross.

== History ==
The Anglican Diocese of the Rocky Mountains traces its origins to the Anglican Mission in the Americas, started as a missionary movement of the Province of the Anglican Church of Rwanda in the United States and Canada, in 2000. The AMiA was a founding member of the Anglican Church in North America, in June 2009, it later would become an associate member and would eventually leave, in December 2011. Most of their parishes decided to create the PEARUSA, as the new missionary district of the Province of the Anglican Church of Rwanda, also a dual member of the ACNA, since June 2012. PEARUSA had three regional networks, Mid-Atlantic and Northeast, West and Southeast. It was decided that all the three regional networks of PEARUSA would join the ACNA at the Synod of the Province of the Anglican Church of Rwanda, at 23 September 2015. The Provincial Council of ACNA, at 21 June 2016, decided that the two regional networks of Mid-Atlantic and Northeast, and West would become two new dioceses, the Anglican Diocese of Christ Our Hope and the Anglican Diocese of the Rocky Mountains, originated from the regional network of the West. The first bishop of the new diocese would be Ken Ross.

While mainly concentrated to the Rocky Mountain region, the diocese is spread across the United States and one of its main purposes is church planting.

== Parishes ==
In 2025, the diocese reported 41 congregations (up 24% from 2022) with 5,532 members (up 29% from 2022) and average Sunday attendance of 5,613 (up 61% from 2022). Notable parishes in the Diocese of the Rocky Mountains include:

Church	Image	City	Year founded	Year completed	Notes
Wellspring Church		Englewood, Colorado	2001	1965	
Trinity Church		Wenatchee, Washington	1995	1929	
