= Boasberg =

Boasberg is a surname. Notable people with the surname include:

- Nathan Boasberg (1825–1910), American businessman
- Al Boasberg (1891–1937), American comedy writer
- James Boasberg (born 1963), American judge
