= Church of the Holy Spirit (Roanoke, Virginia) =

Anglican church in Virginia, US

Coordinates: 37°12′14″N 80°00′34″W

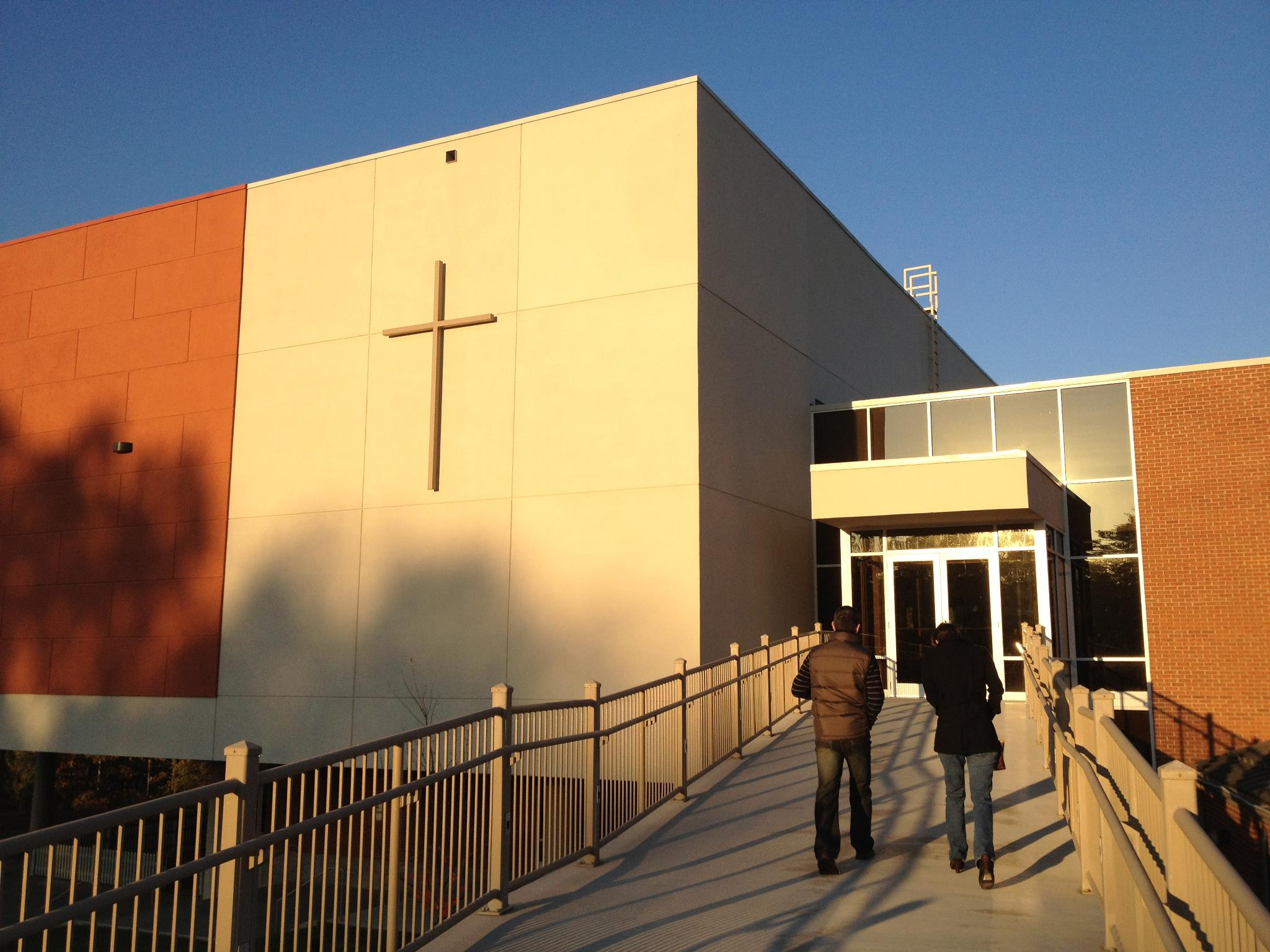
- Location: Roanoke, Virginia
- Country: United States
- Denomination: Anglican Church in North America
- Website: www.chsroanoke.com

History
- Founded: 1985

Administration
- Diocese: Christ Our Hope

Clergy
- Rector: The Rev. Dave Sloop

The Church of the Holy Spirit (CHS) is a large Anglican parish in Cave Spring, Virginia, just outside of Roanoke. Founded in 1985 as part of the Episcopal Diocese of Southwestern Virginia, CHS left the Episcopal Church in 2000 as part of the Anglican realignment.

== History ==
CHS began in 1985 as a home fellowship of Roanoke-area Episcopalians whose faith had been renewed through the Cursillo movement. In 1986, the group was recognized as a mission of the Episcopal Diocese of Southwestern Virginia, and the Rev. Quigg Lawrence was called a rector in January of 1989.

After CHS had met in six different locations to accommodate its growth—from 42 members to more than 1,400 with multiple church plants in the Roanoke area—in 1995, an independent 501(c)(3) nonprofit called the Terumah Foundation raised funds to purchase land and construct a 27,000-square-foot facility on Merriman Road in southwest Roanoke County. While CHS used the property, Terumah remained the owner.

In 2000, early in the process of the Anglican realignment, Bishop Neff Powell deposed Lawrence and ejected CHS from the Diocese of Southwestern Virginia. The property ownership arrangement with Terumah allowed CHS to leave the Episcopal Church without forfeiting the property it used to the diocese. In January 2000, CHS became the first U.S. church to join the Anglican Mission in America, and Lawrence's orders were recognized by the Anglican Church of Rwanda.

In 2012, CHS joined PEARUSA after its separation from AMIA in order to remain connected with the Anglican Church of Rwanda and the Anglican Church in North America. Lawrence was elected suffragan bishop for PEARUSA's Atlantic coast network, where he would assist Steve Breedlove with care for clergy in the region. He remained rector of CHS. The Most Rev. Onesphore Rwaje and the Most Rev. Robert Duncan consecrated Lawrence as a bishop on February 4th, 2013 at CHS.

== Church planting ==
CHS has planted daughter churches in Daleville, Blacksburg and Richmond, Parkersburg, WVa, Beckley WVa, Charleston, WVa, and planted what is now a former Anglican church plant in Salem. The church participates in broader church planting efforts in Virginia and the Northeast through the Diocese of Christ Our Hope, as well as combined parish and diocesan church planting efforts in West Virginia.
