= ECP =

ECP may refer to:

== Military ==
- Early Commissioning Program, a United States Army ROTC program offered by Military Junior College
- Entry Control Point, an established entry and exit point that is a part of layered security used to gain access to Forward Operating Bases (FOBs).

== Organizations ==
- École Centrale Paris, a French university
- Emerging Capital Partners, a private equity firm
- English College in Prague, a Czech high school
- English Collective of Prostitutes, a feminist group
- Episcopal Church in the Philippines, an autocephalous province of the Anglican Communion in the Philippines
- European Committee for the Prevention of Torture
- Evangelical Churches of Pentecost, a Pentecostal denomination which merged with the Apostolic Churches of Pentecost
- Extracurricular Activity: Programs outside of regular school

== Science and technology ==
- Effective Core Potential, a term in computational chemistry
- Electrochemical corrosion potential, an electrode potential with a non-zero net reaction on the working electrode but zero net current
- Electrochemical potential, a thermodynamic measure of chemical potential that includes the energy contribution of electrostatics
- Eastman Color Positive, a photographic processing system
- Electronic Communications in Probability, a scientific journal
- Engineering Change Proposal, see Beretta APX
- Enhanced Content Protection, see MovieLabs

=== Computing ===
- Electronic Check Processing, in electronic banking
- Extended Capability Port, an IEEE 1284 parallel port mode
- Equivalence class partitioning, a software testing technique
- Exascale Computing Project, a U.S. project to accelerate an exascale computing ecosystem
- Excessive crossposts, a form of Usenet spam, see also Breidbart Index

=== Medicine ===
- Eosinophil cationic protein, a basic protein in the eosinophil primary matrix, encoded in humans by the RNASE3 gene
- Emergency Care Practitioner, a type of paramedic or nurse
- Emergency contraceptive pill, a type of contraception also known as morning-after pill
- Endoscopic CycloPhotocoagulation, a minimally invasive treatment for the management of glaucoma
- Extracorporeal photopheresis, a therapy in which blood is treated with a photosensitizing agent and subsequently irradiated with light
- External counterpulsation, a non-invasive therapy used to treat chronic angina and other ischemic heart diseases
- Eye care professional, an individual who provides a service related to the eyes or vision
- European Certificate of Psychotherapy, awarded by the European Association for Psychotherapy

== Transportation ==
- East Coast Parkway, a major highway in the south-east of Singapore
- Electronically controlled pneumatic brakes, a type of railway brake
- Energlyn & Churchill Park railway station, with station code ECP
- Northwest Florida Beaches International Airport (IATA: ECP), near Panama City Beach, Florida, US

== Other uses ==
- Economic calculation problem, an economic term that refers to fallacies in economic planning
- Election Commission of Pakistan
- Empty category principle, a syntactic constraint in theoretical linguistics
- East Coast Park, a beach and park in Singapore
- Extreme corporal punishment, a fictional English band in the movie SLC Punk!
