= Via Apostolica =

Anglican missionary district of Canada

Missionary District of Via Apostolica

Location
- Ecclesiastical province: Anglican Church in North America

Statistics
- Parishes: None (2023)
- Members: 0

Information
- Rite: Anglican
- Established: 2012
- Dissolved: 2022

Leadership
- Bishop: Todd Atkinson 2012-2022 (Deposed in 2024). Quigg Lawrence (interim) 2021-2023

Via Apostolica was a missionary district in the Anglican Church of North America (ACNA), comprising a small number of parishes in the Canadian provinces of Alberta, British Columbia, and Saskatchewan. Despite being located in Canada, the missionary district clergy were canonically resident in the Anglican Diocese of the Upper Midwest, in the United States. Its founding bishop was Todd Atkinson, who was inhibited from episcopal ministry in 2022 and deposed in 2024. As of 2023, all of Via Apostolica's member congregations and clergy had transferred into the Anglican Network in Canada.

== History ==
Via Apostolica was an independent church movement which started in 2012 and found continuity with the Anglican tradition. Via began partnering with ANiC in 2014, when their clergy attended the diocese's synod that year. Through the efforts of ANiC's moderator bishop Charlie Masters, Via's bishop Todd Atkinson was welcomed into ACNA's College of Bishops on January 10, 2019. The next year, during ACNA's provincial assembly, a motion was made to admit Via Apostolica as a provincial missionary district. This motion, was overwhelmingly passed on June 24, 2020. One of the main purposes was that their growth will led them to become a full member diocese of ACNA.

The ACNA official website noticed on 5 September 2021, that due to an ongoing investigation on bishop Todd Atkinson, amidst allegations of misconduct, he will be taking a leave of absence. On 16 October 2021, it was announced that during Atkinson's leave of absence, ACNA had appointed as interim bishop of Via Apostolica, Quigg Lawrence, the suffragan bishop of the Anglican Diocese of Christ Our Hope. On 6 November 2021, ACNA reported that the provincial investigation of Todd Atkinson had begun.

In July 2022, an ACNA board of inquiry unanimously determined that "probable cause and reasonable grounds" to present Atkinson for trial for four violations of Canon IV.2.4, which prohibits bishops from "[c]onduct giving just cause for scandal or offense, including the abuse of ecclesiastical power." Atkinson was inhibited pending trial on July 8. On Sept. 13, Atkinson pleaded not guilty to the charges. On April 3, 2024, the ACNA's Trial Court found Atkinson guilty of all four charges, and on May 9, 2024, the Feast of the Ascension, Atkinson was deposed from sacred ministry.

== Closure ==
On October 6, 2022, Via Apostolica's Bishop's Council announced that all of the missionary district's congregations "have begun official steps of discernment for a new ecclesial home and episcopal oversight" within the ACNA. By fall of 2023, the remaining Via congregations in Calgary, Caronport, Langley, and Lethbridge had applied and joined ANiC, with all but one changing their name to disassoicate with the Via Apostolica moniker.

By November 2023, Via Apostolica's website was no longer available and it was no longer listed as a member jurisdiction on the ACNA website.

On June 25, 2024, the ACNA voted to dissolve the Missionary District following Atkinson's failure to complete necessary steps to officially establish Via Apostolica, as well as his deposition from Sacred Ministry, and all member churches either dissolving or joining ANiC.
