= Quigg Lawrence =

American bishop of the Anglican Church in North America

The Right Reverend R. Quigg Lawrence
- Bishop Suffragan of the Anglican Diocese of Christ Our Hope
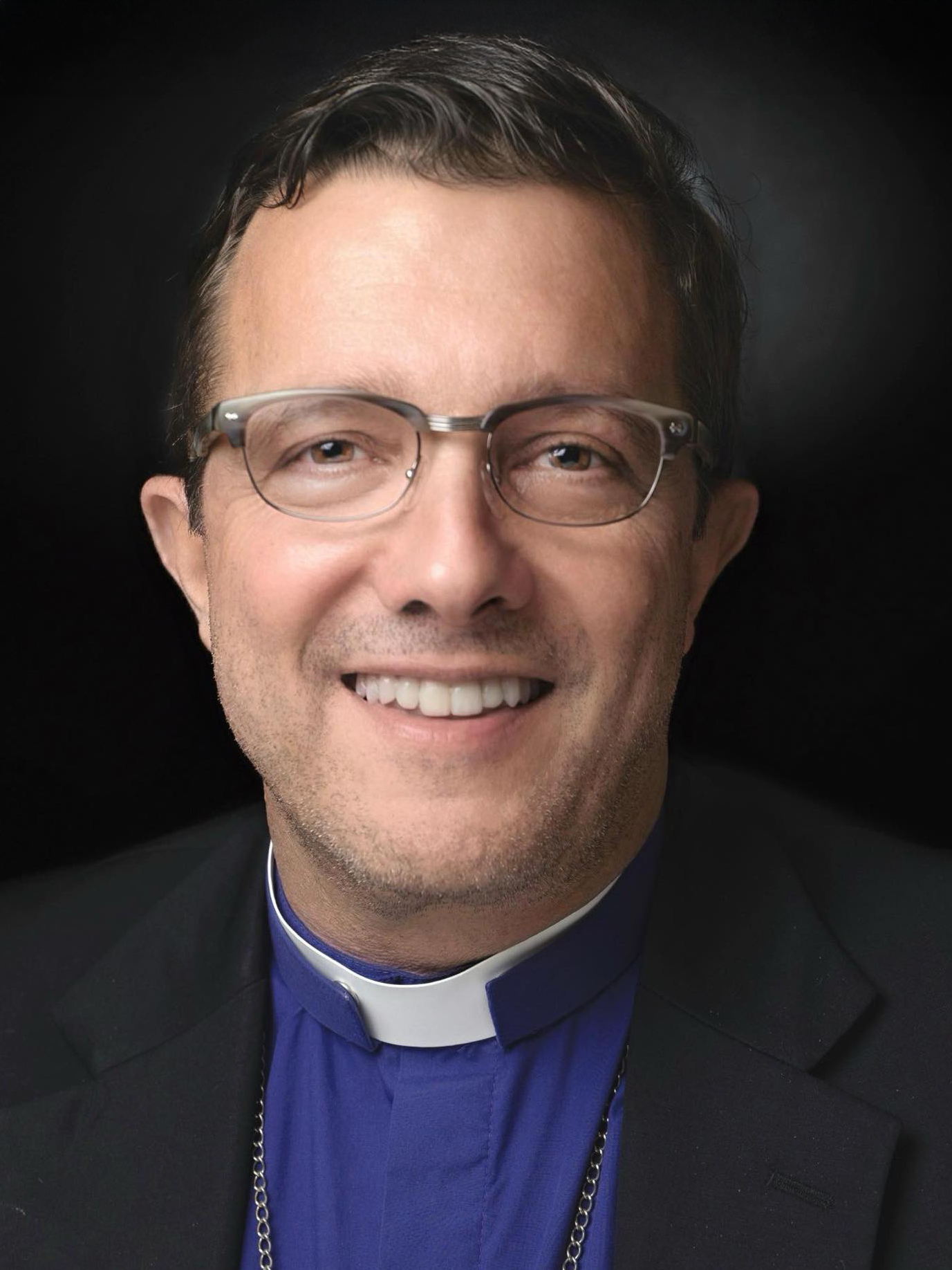
- Bishop Quigg Lawrence
- Church: Anglican Church in North America
- Diocese: PEARUSA (former missionary district of Anglican Church of Rwanda); Christ Our Hope (Anglican Church in North America)
- In office: 2013–present
- Other posts: Rector, Church of the Holy Spirit (1989–2025)

Orders
- Consecration: 4 February 2013 by Onesphore Rwaje

Personal details
- Born: July 10, 1959 (age 67) Richmond, Virginia
- Spouse: Annette Fleet Lawrence
- Children: 3
- Education: Central Washington University; Virginia Theological Seminary; Gordon-Conwell Theological Seminary

Raymond Quigg Lawrence Jr. (born July 10, 1959) is an American bishop of the Anglican Church in North America. He was consecrated in 2013 as bishop suffragan in the Atlantic coast network of PEARUSA, which in 2016 became the Anglican Diocese of Christ Our Hope. From 1989 to 2025, he was rector of the Church of the Holy Spirit in Roanoke County, Virginia.

== Early life and education ==
Lawrence was raised in Richmond, Virginia, the oldest of three children. His father, R. Quigg Lawrence Sr., was a Navy veteran and marketer who worked on the creative team that developed the Virginia Is for Lovers campaign. The elder Lawrence was also a recording studio executive who employed a young Bruce Springsteen, and music promoter, and his son worked as security for acts like David Bowie.

Lawrence attended Collegiate School in Richmond, graduating in 1977. He spent three years at the University of Virginia, where he said he majored in "fraternity mayhem." His ambitions to become a doctor frustrated by his partying and womanizing, he left UVA and spent part of 1979 and all of 1980 working as an EMT and paramedic in Richmond and at the 1980 Winter Olympics in Lake Placid, New York. He came to Christian faith after a fellow surfer gave him a copy of John Stott's Basic Christianity.

Lawrence has said that he received his call to ministry while working as a paramedic:

One night I was in the back of an ambulance attending to a woman who was a drug addict and a prostitute. She had been shot and was dying. Her last words to me, as she looked in my eyes, were, "Pray for me." I offered what I could to her, but I realized I had no idea how to comfort a person's soul at that moment. After that event, and all that I had witnessed while on that job, I became introspective and a bit depressed for a while about the suffering and pain people experience in life. There I was at 20 years old and I realized my life had no real purpose. I came to know that a life without Jesus is completely meaningless.

Lawrence finished his undergraduate degree in emergency medicine at Central Washington University, then enrolled in Virginia Theological Seminary, where he earned his M.Div. Lawrence also met Annette Fleet after completing seminary, and they married in 1986. They have three adult children and seven grandchildren. Lawrence later received a doctorate from Gordon-Conwell Theological Seminary.

== Ordained ministry ==
After graduation, Lawrence was appointed as an associate pastor in Kilmarnock, Virginia. He was released from the job in 1988. In January 1989, he was named the first rector of the Church of the Holy Spirit (CHS), a church plant that had grown out of the Cursillo movement and had just been elevated from mission to parish status in the Episcopal Diocese of Southwestern Virginia. The theologically conservative Lawrence frequently fought with liberalizing elements in the Episcopal Church. “Almost everything was a hill I would die on," Lawrence has said. CHS grew from 42 members to more than 1,400 and spawned multiple church plants in the Roanoke area.

In 1995, an independent 501(c)(3) nonprofit called the Terumah Foundation raised funds to purchase land and construct a 27,000-square-foot facility on Merriman Road in southwest Roanoke County. While CHS used the property, Terumah remained the owner. In 2000, early in the process of the Anglican realignment, Bishop Neff Powell deposed Lawrence and ejected CHS from the Diocese of Southwestern Virginia. The arrangement with Terumah allowed CHS to leave the Episcopal Church without forfeiting the property it used to the diocese. In January 2000, CHS became the first U.S. church to join the Anglican Mission in America, and Lawrence's orders were recognized by the Anglican Church of Rwanda.

== Episcopal ministry ==
Lawrence and CHS joined PEARUSA after its separation from AMIA in order to remain connected with the Anglican Church of Rwanda and the Anglican Church in North America. Lawrence was elected suffragan bishop for PEARUSA's Atlantic coast network, where he would assist Steve Breedlove with care for clergy in the region. He remained rector of CHS.

The Most Rev. Onesphore Rwaje and the Most Rev. Robert Duncan consecrated Lawrence as a bishop on February 4, 2013, at CHS. In 2016, Lawrence and CHS transitioned from PEARUSA to the newly constituted Anglican Diocese of Christ Our Hope, ending the dual canonical residency in the ACNA and Rwanda.

After Todd Atkinson took a leave of absence and was later inhibited over charges of abuse of spiritual authority, Lawrence was in October 2021 appointed interim bishop for Via Apostolica. He remained bishop suffragan in the Diocese of Christ Our Hope and rector at CHS.

== Bluegrass ==
In 2021, Lawrence and several bluegrass music friends recorded a bluegrass compilation album called Come Home. Lawrence writes bluegrass album reviews for Bluegrass Today and Bluegrass Unlimited. Lawrence's 2026 album with Junior Sisk will be released in the spring of 2026.

== Israel ==
In October 2023, Bishop and Mrs. Lawrence were planning to lead a large group tour of Israel. They landed early on October 7, the day the Hamas attack broke out. After 48 hours they were able to flee the country, traveling from Tel Aviv to Ethiopia to Ireland to Chicago to Virginia.
