= Alan J. Hawkins (bishop) =

American Anglican bishop (born 1970)

The Right Reverend Alan J. Hawkins
- Bishop Ordinary of the Anglican Diocese of Christ Our Hope
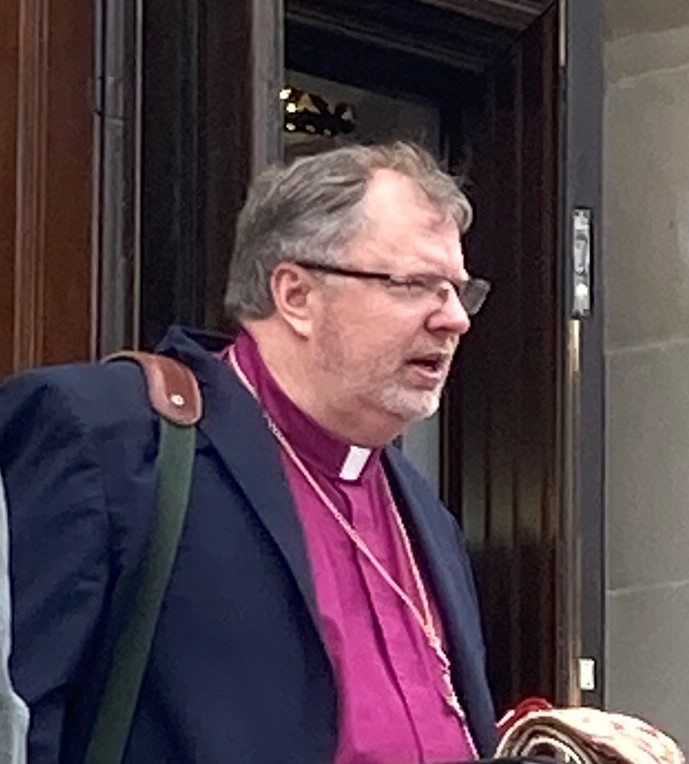
- Church: Anglican Church in North America
- Diocese: Christ Our Hope
- In office: 2024–present
- Predecessor: Steve Breedlove
- Previous posts: Chief operating officer, Anglican Church in North America (2018–2024); Canon for development, ACNA (2014–2018); Vicar, Anglican 1000, ACNA (2012–2014); Rector, Church of the Redeemer (2008–2021)

Orders
- Consecration: November 5, 2021 by Foley Beach

Personal details
- Born: 1970 (age 54–55) Wichita, Kansas

Alan J. Hawkins (born 1970) is an American bishop of the Anglican Church in North America. Since 2024, he has been the second bishop ordinary of the Anglican Diocese of Christ Our Hope. Prior to this, he was the founding rector of Church of the Redeemer in Greensboro, North Carolina, and he has served in several roles at the provincial level for the ACNA, including chief operating officer of the province, canon for provincial development, and vicar of the ACNA-wide Anglican 1000 church planting initiative.

== Early life, education, and early ministry ==
Hawkins was born in 1970 in Wichita, Kansas, the youngest of three children. He was principally raised in Perry, Oklahoma. His parents became regular church attenders and Hawkins was baptized at age five in the Lutheran Church–Missouri Synod. He had a conversion experience in 1989 while studying at Oklahoma State University (OSU) and became involved with Cru at OSU.

Hawkins married his wife, Angela Kaye, in 1993 after he graduated from OSU and she graduated from Texas A&M. They have five children.

Hawkins began serving in ministry as a staff member with Cru. He received an M.A. in theological studies from the Reformed Theological Seminary in 2002.

== Pastoral career ==
In 2008, Hawkins and his wife planted the Church of the Redeemer in Greensboro as part of the Anglican Mission in America. The church began as a small group in the Hawkins' living room and as of 2021 had attendance of nearly 500.

Hawkins envisioned the church as a "parish, park, farm, and abbey." In 2017, Redeemer moved to a new eight-acre campus in north Greensboro on the site of a former plant nursery. The site, called New Garden Park, has a 6,000-square-foot greenhouse and five agricultural high tunnels to enable year-round growing. The farm operation generated enough vegetables to feed 30 families on average each week in 2019. In addition to two English-language services, Redeemer holds an Arabic service and an East African service in Kinyarwanda and Swahili. The church also hosts daily Morning Prayer services as part of the abbey vision.

At Redeemer, Hawkins emphasized the roles of women in leadership, including preaching, teaching, and leading, even though the Diocese of Christ Our Hope holds to a complementarian position that permits women to be ordained to the diaconate only.

== Diocesan and provincial roles ==
In addition to serving as rector of Redeemer from 2008 to 2021, Hawkins held numerous roles at the diocesan and provincial levels. He served as an AMIA network leader for churches in North Carolina, east Tennessee and southern Virginia. He later served as a founding leader in PEARUSA and as canon missioner in the Diocese of Christ Our Hope from 2015 to 2021. He led the diocese's church planting strategy, built a system for missional partnership proposals that he said has funded several million dollars' worth of mission activities, and designed the diocese's regional deanery operational plan.

In 2012, Hawkins was appointed vicar, or provincial director, of Anglican 1000, the ACNA's province-wide church planting initiative with a goal of making church planting the "norm" for ACNA dioceses and churches. The initiative responded to a call by Archbishop Robert Duncan to plant 1,000 new churches in five years. Through Anglican 1,000, Hawkins championed a "1-2-3" model, challenging each of the ACNA's 950 congregations to commit to planting one church within the next two years using one of three church planting methods.

In 2014, the newly elected archbishop, Foley Beach, named Hawkins as canon for provincial development, where he helped raise $1 million annually to support provincial initiatives. In 2018, Hawkins was named chief operating officer for the ACNA, overseeing the church's financial and communications offices in Ambridge, Pennsylvania, and the ACNA's initiatives on leadership development, diversity, youth leadership, global partnerships, justice and mercy ministries, church planting, and generosity. At the communion level, Hawkins also led GAFCON's church planting network. In 2021 and 2022, Hawkins served on the Provincial Response Team dealing with investigations into the handling of sexual abuse reports in the Diocese of the Upper Midwest. Hawkins' leadership of the Provincial Response Team came under question by survivors and ACNA petitioners after three prominent members of the team resigned in protest, but the investigations continued despite protests and petitions from survivors.

On April 29, 2021, Hawkins was elected bishop coadjutor of the Diocese of Christ Our Hope. He was consecrated by Foley Beach at Redeemer in Greensboro on November 5, 2021. Redeemer was in January 2022 named a pro-cathedral of the diocese and Hawkins stepped down as rector. The episcopal transition from Christ Our Hope's diocesan bishop, Steve Breedlove, is expected to be lengthy, with Hawkins committing to serve as ACNA COO until the end of Beach's primacy in 2024. He succeeded Breedlove as bishop ordinary at the diocesan synod in November 2024.

Religious titles
Preceded by Steve Breedlove	Bishop of the Diocese of Christ Our Hope; Since 2024	Incumbent
