= AWM =

AWM may refer to:

- Academies of West Memphis, a public high school in West Memphis, Arkansas
- Appliance Wiring Material, covered by UL standard 758
- Apostolic Women's Ministries, an organization that serves the women of the Apostolic Church of Pentecost
- Accuracy International AWM, a British-made sniper rifle
- Ardent Window Manager, an early window manager for the X Window System
- Ashwell & Morden railway station, United Kingdom National Rail code AWM
- Association for Women in Mathematics, a professional society to support women in mathematics
- Atlantis World Media, parent company of the Atlantis Cable News (ACN) fictional news channel on the American TV series The Newsroom
- Australian War Memorial, a memorial to Australian soldiers in Canberra
- West Memphis Municipal Airport (IATA code AWM)
