= ACOP =

ACOP may refer to:

- A Change of Pace, a pop punk band from Peoria, Arizona
- Apostolic Church of Pentecost, a Pentecostal denomination

Acop is a surname. Notable people with this surname include:

- Romeo Acop (1947–2025), Filipino police officer, lawyer, and politician
