= Benjamin Fischer (bishop) =

American Anglican bishop (born 1978)

The Right Reverend Ben Fischer
- Suffragan Bishop of the Rocky Mountains
- Church: Anglican Church in North America
- Diocese: Rocky Mountains
- In office: 2024–present

Orders
- Ordination: 2011 (priesthood)
- Consecration: February 5, 2024 by Foley Beach

Personal details
- Born: 1978 (age 46–47)

Benjamin Louis Fischer (born 1978) is an American Anglican bishop and academic. He was consecrated in 2024 as the first bishop suffragan of the Anglican Diocese of the Rocky Mountains in the Anglican Church in North America.

== Academic career ==
Fischer received his B.A. and M.A. in church history from Emory University, and obtained his Ph.D. in English literature from the University of Notre Dame in 2008. His dissertation, under the direction of Joseph Buttigieg, was on "religion and the cultural politics of British imperialist ambition in China." Following his Ph.D. completion, Fischer became assistant professor of English at Northwest Nazarene University in Nampa, Idaho, where he taught early British literature, Shakespeare, modern drama, linguistics and composition. He later received tenure at NNU and an appointment as associate professor.

== Ordained ministry ==
After moving to Nampa, Fischer and his wife, Brooke, joined an Anglican Mission in the Americas church plant in Eagle, Idaho. They led student ministry outreach at this church for several years. After Fischer was ordained to the priesthood in AMiA in 2011, he led a church planting effort in Nampa that came to fruition in 2014 as Christ the Redeemer Anglican Church. Initially resident in PEARUSA, Christ the Redeemer became a founding member of the Diocese of the Rocky Mountains.

In 2023, Fischer was elected as the diocese's first bishop suffragan in a part-time role. He was consecrated in February 2024 at Wellspring Church in Englewood, Colorado, by Archbishop Foley Beach and continued to serve as rector of Christ the Redeemer.

== Personal life ==
Fischer married Brooke Underwood in 2003. They have three children.

== Bibliography ==
=== Books ===
- Wycliffe, John (2021). Fischer, Benjamin (ed.). Being A Pastor: Pastoral Treatises of John Wycliffe. Landrum, South Carolina: Davenant Institute. ISBN 978-1949716054.
- Fischer, Benjamin; Kanana, Cedric (2021). Joy Renewed: A Biblical Prescription for Rediscovering Joy in Late Modernity. Eugene, Oregon: Wipf and Stock. ISBN 9781666715576.
- Kanana, Cedric; Fischer, Benjamin (2022). I Once Was Dead: How God Rescued Me from Islam, Drugs, Witchcraft, and even Death. Chicago: Oasis International. ISBN 978-1594528538.

=== Articles ===
- Fischer, Benjamin; Derbesy, Philip C. (2015). "Literary Catholicity An Alternate Reading of Influence in the Work of C. S. Lewis and G. K. Chesterton". Religion and the Arts. 19 (4): 389–410.
- Fischer, Benjamin (2015). "Civilized Depravity: Evangelical Representations of Early-Nineteenth-Century China and the Redefinition of 'True Civilization'". Victorian Literature and Culture. 43 (2): 409–429.
- Fischer, Benjamin L. (2016). "A Novel Resistance: Mission Narrative as the Anti-Novel in the Evangelical Assault on British Culture". Studies in Church History. 59.
