= Damien Kurek =

Canadian politician (born 1989)

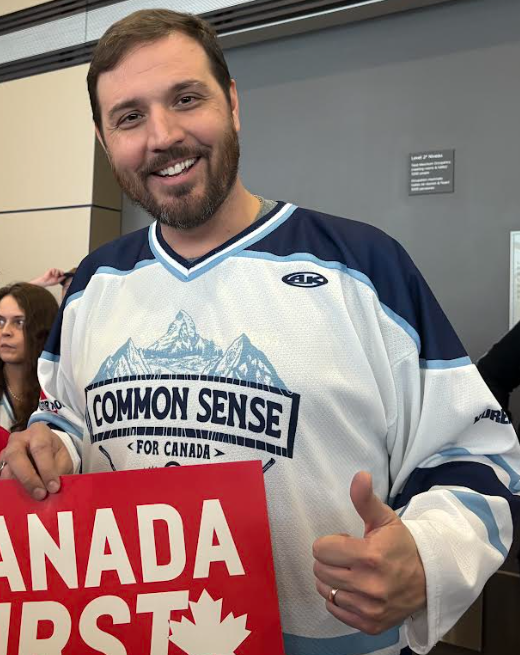
- Kurek in 2025

Member of Parliament for Battle River—Crowfoot
- In office October 21, 2019 – June 17, 2025
- Preceded by: Kevin Sorenson
- Succeeded by: Pierre Poilievre

Personal details
- Born: November 28, 1989 (age 36) Consort, Alberta, Canada
- Party: Conservative
- Spouse: Danielle (m. 2012)
- Children: 3
- Education: Eston College; Trinity Western University

Damien C. Kurek (born November 28, 1989) is a Canadian lobbyist, farmer and politician who was the member of Parliament (MP) for Battle River—Crowfoot from 2019 to 2025. A member of the Conservative Party, Kurek resigned from the House of Commons on June 17, 2025, triggering a by-election that was won by party leader Pierre Poilievre. Following his resignation, Kurek became a principal at Toronto-based government relations and public affairs company Upstream Strategy Group.

== Early life and education ==
Born in 1989, Kurek grew up in Consort, Alberta, the son of Jodi and Jason Felix Kurek. When he was fifteen, Kurek went on a trip to Ottawa and put a call into Stephen Harper's office. A ten-minute meeting was arranged with Kurek, Harper, and Kurek's MP at the time, Kevin Sorenson. Kurek is quoted as saying, "For a kid who loved politics, that was the pinnacle of everything you could possibly imagine." In about 2007 (during his final year of high school), his parents moved to the farm where he had helped out through his childhood. In his early adult years Kurek worked seasonally in the oil and gas sector.

Kurek obtained his high school diploma in 2008 from Consort Public School. After high school, Kurek went to Eston College, where he obtained an associate diploma in Biblical Studies in 2010. Kurek also holds a bachelor's degree in political science and communications from Trinity Western University as of 2015.

== Political career ==
=== Political staffer ===
He also worked for MP Kevin Sorenson and in various roles at the Saskatchewan Legislative Assembly. Before he was nominated as the Conservative candidate himself in Battle River—Crowfoot, Kurek worked for Sorenson's constituency office in Camrose, Alberta.

=== Member of Parliament ===
Kurek was elected to Parliament in the 2019 general election. Kurek has served as the Conservative shadow minister of Canadian heritage.

On May 2, 2025, Kurek announced he would resign his seat and step down as an MP to trigger the 2025 Battle River—Crowfoot federal by-election, which party leader Pierre Poilievre contested and won due to his defeat in Carleton in the 2025 general election. Kurek said he intends to run again in the riding in the next general election. Per the Elections Act, Kurek was able to resign 30 days after the election result was officially published in the Canada Gazette, which occurred on May 15, 2025.

On June 17, 2025, Kurek officially resigned his seat in the House of Commons. In December 2025, the Conservative national council bypassed the nomination process, and he was acclaimed as the party candidate for Battle River—Crowfoot for the upcoming election.

== Private sector career ==
Following his resignation from Parliament, government relations and public affairs firm Upstream Strategy Group announced that Kurek would join the company as a principal, to provide "tailored government relations, public affairs, and stakeholder engagement solutions for Upstream's clients in Alberta and beyond".

Before, during, and after his time in Parliament Kurek has remained actively involved in his family's multi generational farm in Alberta's Special Areas.

== Personal life ==
Kurek resides in Alberta's Special Areas. He also continues to work on his family farm. Kurek married his wife, Danielle, on June 9, 2012, in Saskatoon and has three sons.

== Electoral record ==
2025 Canadian federal election: Battle River—Crowfoot
Party	Candidate	Votes	%	±%	Expenditures
Conservative	Damien Kurek	53,684	82.84	+11.55	$91,654.90
Liberal	Brent Sutton	7,566	11.67	+7.38	$3,126.03
New Democratic	James MacKay	2,061	3.18	–6.52	none listed
People's	Jonathan Bridges	1,022	1.58	–7.69	$4.50
Green	Douglas Gook	474	0.73	–0.21	none listed
Total valid votes/expense limit		64,807	99.40	–	$159,014.07
Total rejected ballots		391	0.60	+0.16	
Turnout		65,198	74.45	+2.67	
Eligible voters		87,578			
Conservative hold		Swing		+9.47	
Source: Elections Canada

2021 Canadian federal election: Battle River—Crowfoot
Party	Candidate	Votes	%	±%	Expenditures
Conservative	Damien Kurek	41,819	71.29	–14.20	$97,164.96
New Democratic	Tonya Ratushniak	5,761	9.82	+4.71	$1,764.29
People's	Dennis Trepanier	5,440	9.27	+6.67	$1,916.25
Liberal	Leah Diane McLeod	2,515	4.29	+0.19	$2,023.58
Maverick	Jeff Golka	2,393	4.08	–	$28,982.24
Green	Daniel Brisbin	554	0.94	–1.77	$234.04
Veterans Coalition	John Irwin	178	0.30	–	none listed
Total valid votes/expense limit		58,660	99.56	–	$135,622.71
Total rejected ballots		260	0.44	–0.12	
Turnout		58,920	71.77	–3.66	
Eligible voters		82,090			
Conservative hold		Swing		–9.45	
Source: Elections Canada

2019 Canadian federal election: Battle River—Crowfoot
Party	Candidate	Votes	%	±%	Expenditures
Conservative	Damien Kurek	53,309	85.49	+4.58	$56,911.61
New Democratic	Natasha Fryzuk	3,185	5.11	–1.43	none listed
Liberal	Dianne Clarke	2,557	4.10	–5.27	none listed
Green	Geordie Nelson	1,689	2.71	–0.47	$2,467.23
People's	David A. Michaud	1,620	2.60	–	none listed
Total valid votes/expense limit		62,360	99.44	–	$132,092.34
Total rejected ballots		352	0.56	+0.29	
Turnout		62,712	75.43	+3.34	
Eligible voters		83,139			
Conservative hold		Swing		+3.01	
Source: Elections Canada
