= Todd Atkinson =

Deposed Canadian Anglican bishop

- Bishop of Via Apostolica
- Church: Anglican Church in North America (2019–2024)
- Diocese: Via Apostolica
- In office: 2012–2021

Orders
- Consecration: January 2019 by ACNA College of Bishops (Regularized)
- Laicized: May 9, 2024

Todd Atkinson is a Canadian former Anglican bishop. From 2019 to 2024, he was a bishop of the Anglican Church in North America (ACNA) and the founding bishop of Via Apostolica. ACNA determined that Atkinson was irregularly consecrated a bishop on the Eve of the Ascension 2012. Atkinson was later regularized into ACNA's College of Bishops on January 10, 2019 then the next year, on June 24, 2020, Via Apostolica was accepted as a missionary district in ACNA. Following a lengthy investigation into allegations of misconduct, Atkinson was found guilty by the ACNA on multiple charges, including (but not limited to) charges involving underage females. He was deposed from ordained ministry on May 9, 2024, the feast of the Ascension.

== Education and career ==
Atkinson grew up in the Canadian Prairies and became a Christian in his teen years. At the age of 18 Atkinson moved to the United Kingdom to train with an evangelist. At the age of 25 Atkinson began attending the University of Oxford studying theology and philosophy. After his studies he returned to Canada and served as president of Eston College. After less than two years he returned to the United Kingdom with his wife to serve as missionaries in Scotland. Atkinson returned in 2003 and began pastoral ministry in Lethbridge, Alberta. This church would eventually be the origins of Via Apostolica, which would formally begin with his consecration as a bishop in 2012.

The ACNA official website reported on 5 September 2021 that bishop Todd Atkinson, amidst allegations of misconduct, was taking a leave of absence. On 16 October 2021, it was announced that during this time, ACNA had appointed as Interim Bishop of Via Apostolica, Quigg Lawrence. On 6 November 2021, ACNA reported that the provincial investigation had begun.

In July 2022, an ACNA board of inquiry unanimously determined that "probable cause and reasonable grounds" to present Atkinson for trial for four violations of Canon IV.2.4, which prohibits bishops from "conduct giving just cause for scandal or offense, including the abuse of ecclesiastical power." Atkinson was inhibited pending trial on June 8 and on September 13, 2022, Atkinson pleaded not guilty to all charges. Amidst this scandal, on October 6, 2022, Via Apostolica's Bishop's Council announced that all parishes formerly under Atkinson's leadership had "begun official steps of discernment for a new ecclesial home and episcopal oversight" within the ACNA. By fall of 2023, several months prior to his deposition, the remaining Missionary District congregations in Calgary, Caronport, Langley, and Lethbridge had applied and joined ANiC.

On April 3, 2024, the ACNA's Trial Court found Atkinson guilty of all four charges. On the Feast of the Ascension, May 9, 2024, after Atkinson reportedly failed to appeal the verdict in a timely manner, the ACNA College of Bishops voted to depose him from ordained ministry.

Almost immediately following his deposition from ministry Atkinson began training spiritual directors and offering one-on-one spiritual direction.
