= Nathan Boasberg =

Dutch Jewish settler of Buffalo, New York (1825–1910)

Nathan Boasberg (10 May 1825 – 1 September 1910) was a businessman and one of the early Dutch Jewish settlers of Buffalo, New York. He was for many years one of the leading clothing manufacturers in Buffalo.

== Biography ==
Nathan Boasberg was born on 10 May 1825 in Amsterdam. He went to Leyden University and after joined the Dutch Navy. He was on a man-of-war that went to New York, and while there he was persuaded to remain by an uncle of his. In 1848 he traveled on the Erie Canal to Buffalo where he stayed. Nathan Boasberg was part of a larger Dutch Jewish emigration to New York and other east coast cities, some of whom followed trade routes to the Great Lakes frontier cities of Buffalo, Pittsburgh, Cleveland, Cincinnati, Toledo, Detroit, and especially Chicago, where his younger brother Benjamin Boasberg eventually settled.

He married Rachel Van Baalen and had nine children.

After starting as a peddler, he opened a clothing business in the 1850s on Pearl Street, then moved it to Commercial Street, and later to 190 Main Street. One of his business partners was Emanuel Van Baalen who relocated by 1860 to the larger Jewish community of Detroit..

Nathan Boasberg was one of the charter members of Temple Beth El. He became secretary of the Temple in 1856 and became a Trustee in 1858. Later he became a member of Temple Beth Zion. He was active with many charities in Buffalo. He was on the original board of directors of the Hebrew Benevolent Society of Buffalo. He was a member of the Independent Order of B’nai B’rith (I.O.B.B.) and was the financial secretary of the Montefiore Lodge.

== Death ==
Nathan Boasberg died on 6 September 1910 in Buffalo, New York. At the time of his death, he was Buffalo’s oldest Jewish settler and the oldest living charter member of Temple Beth El. He was buried at Forest Lawn Cemetery.
