= East End Historic District (Charleston, West Virginia) =

Historic district in West Virginia, United States

- U.S. National Register of Historic Places
- U.S. Historic district
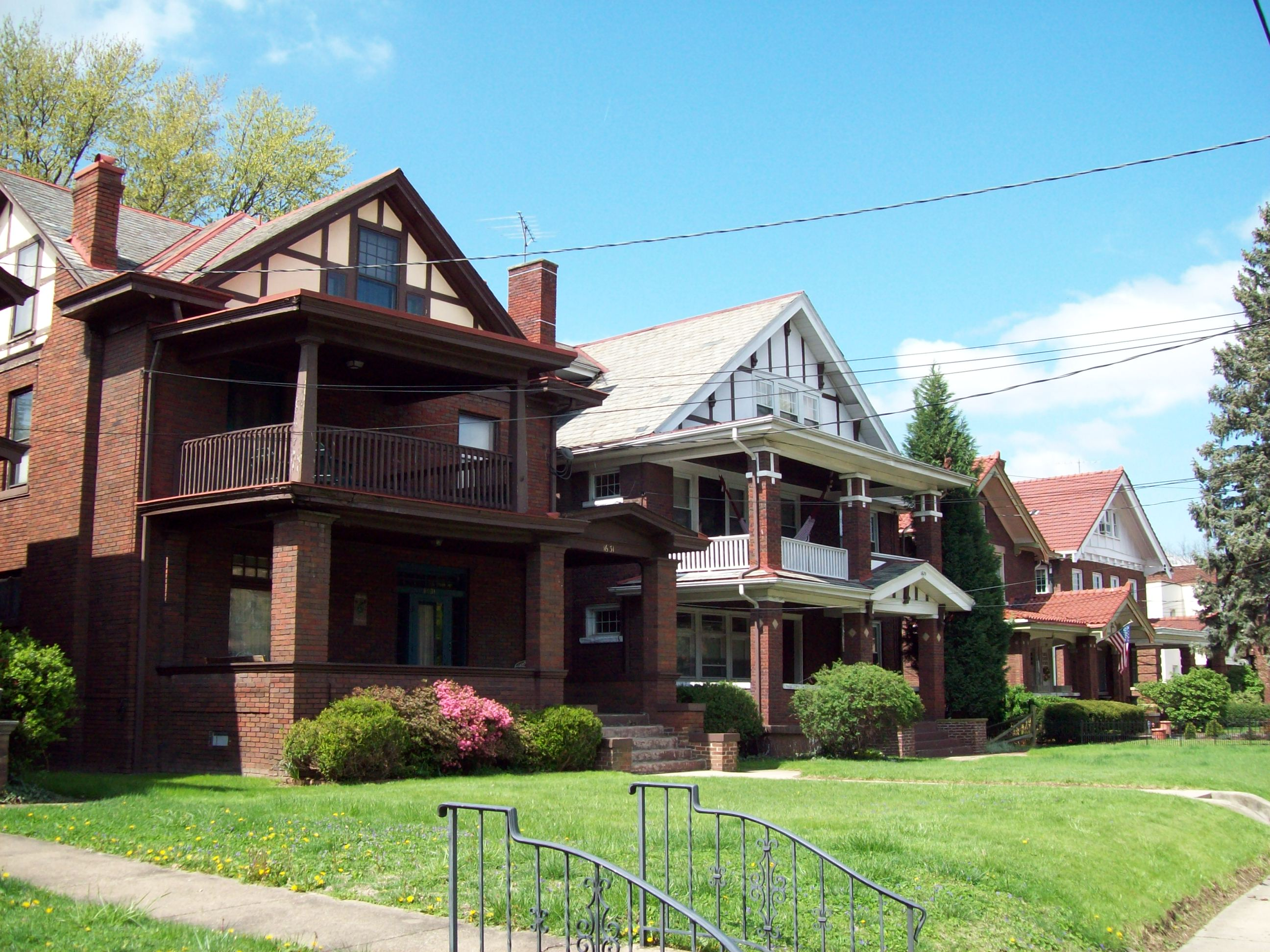
- East End Historic District Homes, April 2009

- Location within West Virginia Location within the United States
- Location: Roughly bounded by the Kanawha River, Bradford, Quarrier, and Greenbriar Sts., Charleston, West Virginia
- Coordinates: 38°20′16″N 81°36′53″W
- Built: 1895
- Architect: Multiple
- Architectural style: Late 19th And 20th Century Revivals, Late Victorian
- NRHP reference No.: 78002800 (original); 14001060 (increase)

Significant dates
- Added to NRHP: April 20, 1978
- Boundary increase: December 16, 2014

East End Historic District is a national historic district located at Charleston, West Virginia. The district is set on a broad, ancient flood plain bordered by the Great Kanawha River on the south and by commercialized Washington Street on the north.

The West Virginia State Capitol complex forms an axis between the two important residential East End neighborhoods. The Statehouse dominates the vistas from all directions in the district. Holly Grove Mansion, constructed in 1815, is the oldest house in the East End. The East End displays a variety of architectural styles ranging from isolated surviving examples of the Greek Revival to the late Victorian Queen Anne. Also included, primarily in the western section, are examples of the eclectic style of the second half of the 19th century to the revivals of the pre-World War I period. Interspersed is a variety of adaptations and elements of almost every style: Italianate, Eastlake, Shingle, and Romanesque features being more prevalent in the western area, while the Georgian, Neo-Classical, Jacobethan, Prairie and Bungaloid are more often seen toward the eastern section.

Buildings are predominantly of brick, but there are a number of frame and stuccoed dwellings. Most buildings are single or double family dwellings of two or two and a half stories; exceptions are primarily apartment units of from three to six floors that blend quite well rather than more modern intrusions.

It was listed on the National Register of Historic Places in 1971, and was increased in size in 2014, encompassing properties like the former St. Paul's Evangelical Lutheran Church.
