= Ken Ross (bishop) =

American Anglican bishop (born 1964)

The Right Reverend Kenneth Ross
- Bishop of the Rocky Mountains
- Church: Anglican Church in North America
- Diocese: Rocky Mountains
- In office: 2013–present

Orders
- Consecration: February 1, 2013 by Onesphore Rwaje

Personal details
- Born: 1964 (age 61–62)

Kenneth Erik Ross (born 1964) is an American Anglican bishop. Since 2016, he has been the first diocesan bishop of the Anglican Diocese of the Rocky Mountains in the Anglican Church in North America.

Ross began his ordained ministry as an Episcopal priest. He was serving a church in Littleton, Colorado, when the 2000 General Convention of the Episcopal Church passed a resolution recognizing and providing encouragement for sexual relationships outside of marriage. Ross called the decision the "last straw" and Ross's church voted almost unanimously to leave the Episcopal Church.

In 2001, Ross and his wife, Sallie, and their two sons moved to Colorado Springs to plant a church as part of the nascent Anglican Mission in the Americas (AMIA). In September 2002, they launched International Anglican Church (IAC). The name reflected Ross's desire to build and maintain connections to Rwanda. The church sponsors an annual 5K run staged in both Colorado Springs and Kibali, Rwanda, that raises funds for health care, economic development and education in Kibali. IAC has a sister parish relationship with Kibali Parish in the Anglican Diocese of Byumba. The church also had a mission to serve people who felt "wounded" by past church experiences. IAC has planted two new churches in Colorado Springs since 2002.

In 2010, AMIA—which had been a founding member of the Anglican Church in North America the year before—left full membership, changing its status in ACNA to "ministry partner." By the next year, the relationship between Chuck Murphy, the leader of AMIA, and its province of canonical residence, the Anglican Church of Rwanda, had broken down, and Murphy and all but two AMIA bishops removed AMIA from Rwandan jurisdiction and restructured it as a "missionary society."

In early 2012, a majority of AMIA congregations elected to remain canonically in the Rwandan church and pursue full membership and "dual citizenship" in the ACNA, forming PEARUSA. Ross was a member of the steering committee for PEARUSA and was elected to serve as bishop of PEARUSA's western network. He was consecrated as a bishop in 2013 and continued to serve as rector of IAC until 2015.

In 2015, the Anglican Church of Rwanda transferred PEARUSA congregations to sole ACNA jurisdiction. PEARUSA's western network was reconstituted as the Anglican Diocese of the Rocky Mountains, with Ross as its first diocesan bishop.

Religious titles
New title	Bishop of the PEARUSA Western Network; 2013–2016	Position abolished
New title	I Bishop of the Rocky Mountains; 2016–present	Incumbent
