= Bill Atwood (bishop) =

American bishop of the Anglican Church in North America

The Right Reverend Bill Atwood
- Bishop of the International Diocese
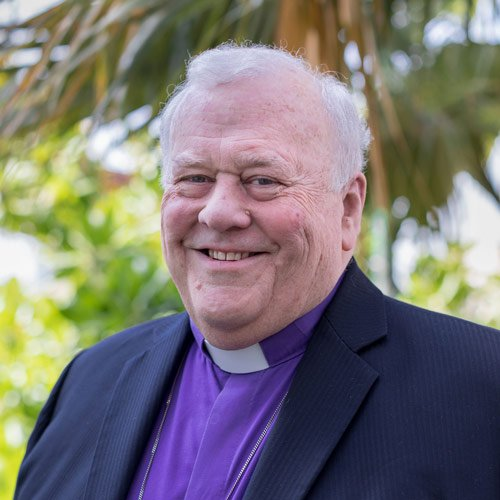
- Church: Anglican Church in North America
- Diocese: International Diocese
- In office: 2009–2024
- Predecessor: See created
- Successor: See dissolved
- Other posts: Dean of International Affairs, ACNA; Suffragan Bishop in the Diocese of All Saints' in the Anglican Church of Kenya

Orders
- Ordination: 1979
- Consecration: 2007 by Benjamin Nzimbi

William G. Atwood III is an American Anglican bishop. He was the first and only bishop of the International Diocese in the Anglican Church in North America, where he served as dean of international affairs. He was previously a suffragan bishop in the Diocese of All Saints' in the Anglican Church of Kenya.

== Biography ==
Atwood was a pilot in the U.S. Air Force. During his military service, he had a conversion experience and decided to pursue ordained ministry. His theological training was at Mercer School of Theology, King's College London and Fuller Theological Seminary, where he received a D.Min. He was ordained to the priesthood in 1979.

Atwood was general secretary of Ekklesia and spent much of his time shuttling to different international Anglican events. In August 2007, as part of the Anglican realignment, he was made a suffragan bishop of the Anglican Church of Kenya in order to oversee congregations disaffiliating from the Episcopal Church.

Atwood later became bishop of the International Diocese in the newly formed Anglican Church in North America. This diocese was created to fund Atwood's role as dean of international affairs for the province. Atwood announced his intention to retire in June 2024, in advance of which date congregations in the transitional International Diocese may discern their future homes in other ACNA dioceses.
