= Hope Church (Charleston, West Virginia) =

Anglican church in Charleston, West Virginia, United States

Coordinates: 38°20′36″N 81°37′29″W

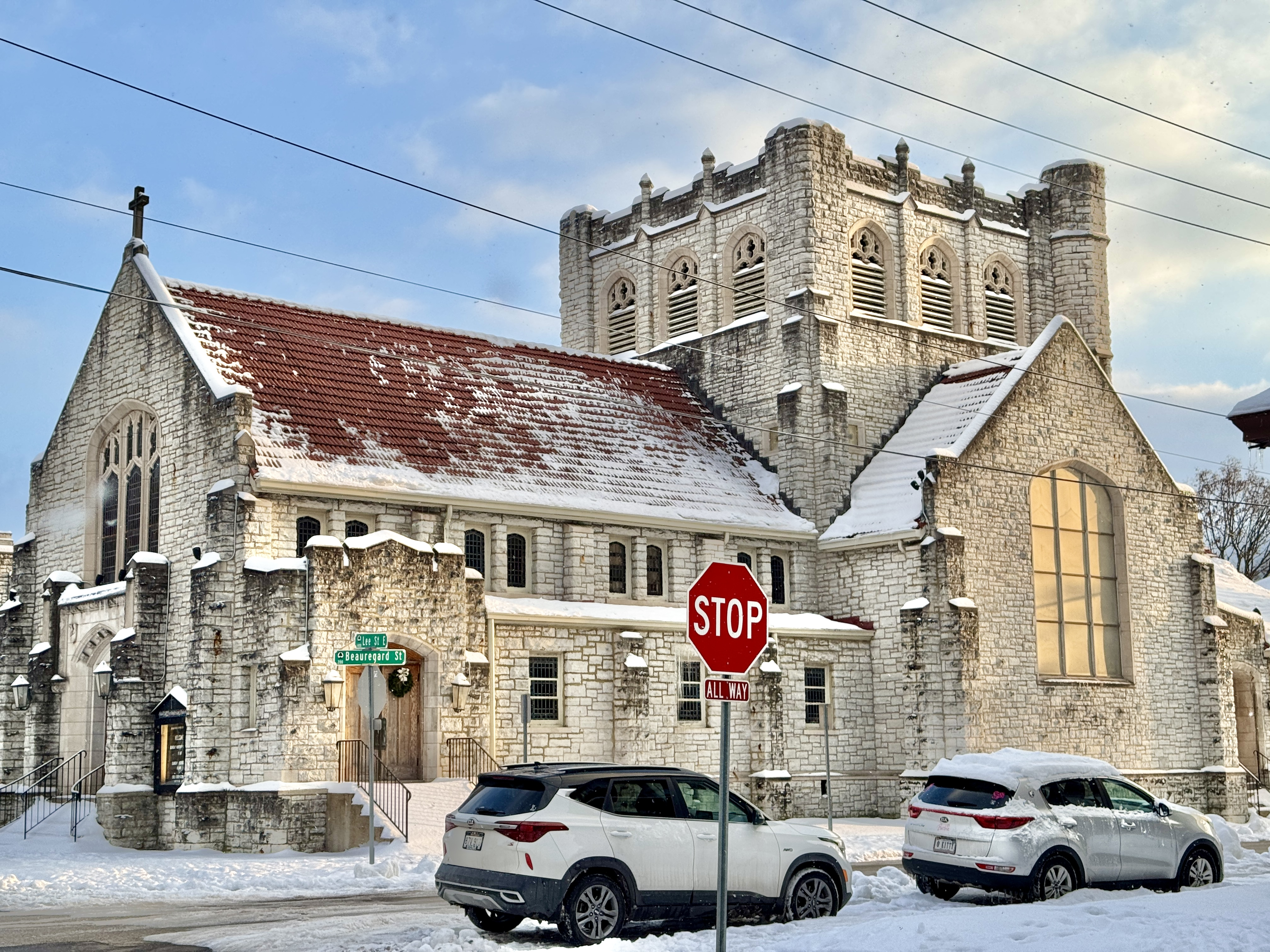
- Hope Church (then St. Paul's Presbyterian Church) photographed in 2025
- Location: 1423 Lee Street East, Charleston, West Virginia
- Country: United States
- Denomination: Anglican Church in North America
- Website: hopecharleston.org

History
- Founded: 2017

Architecture
- Architect(s): Weber, Werner and Adkins
- Style: Tudor Gothic Revival
- Years built: 1915

Administration
- Diocese: Christ Our Hope

Clergy
- Rector: The Rev. Derek Roberts
- St. Paul's Evangelical Lutheran Church
- U.S. Historic district – Contributing property
- Part of: East End Historic District (ID14001060)
- Added to NRHP: July 15, 2014

Hope Church is an Anglican parish in Charleston, West Virginia, where it is located in a historic early 20th-century Tudor Revival church building. The building was originally built in 1915 for St. Paul's Evangelical Lutheran Church, a congregation formed by German-speaking Lutherans that owned the building until 2014, when due to declining membership it merged with a nearby church and sold the building to a Presbyterian church. In 2016, the Presbyterian church donated the building to Hope Church, which had been planted in 2017 as part of the Anglican Church in North America. The stone building and its attached parish house and Sunday school wing are contributing properties in Charleston's East End Historic District.

== History ==
St. Paul's Evangelical Lutheran Church was organized by German-speaking Lutherans in 1892 and first occupied a building on Court Street in Charleston. It constructed the building on Lee Street in 1915 to a design by the Cincinnati firm of Weber, Werner and Adkins.

The Lutheran congregation experienced declining membership in the 2000s and decided to sell the building in 2012. The congregation held its final service in November 2013, merging with Trinity Evangelical Lutheran Church. In 2014, the St. Paul's building was sold to Riverview Presbyterian Church (Presbyterian Church in America). The church was added to the National Register of Historic Places in 2014 as a contributing property to the East End Historic District when the district's boundaries were increased.

In 2026, the Presbyterian congregation donated the St. Paul's building to Hope Church, a congregation of the Anglican Church in North America that had been planted in 2017. Hope Church held its first service in the building on Pentecost Sunday.

== Architecture ==
The stone cross-gable church building, designed in the English Tudor Revival style, is dominated by a crenellated square tower where the gables meet at the junction of the two gables. Parapets surmount each axis of the church, and the roof is composed of red clay tiles. The tower features trefoil patterns in its louvers. The entrance is marked by double wooden doors set in an arched surround. The nave is four bays wide.

The church has a wide variety of window types. It is known for its stained glass windows, including a window featuring Saint Paul that includes 6,000 pieces of Blenko glass. The church is attached to a one-story parish hall with half-timbered gabled dormers and to a two-story, flat-roofed, stone-faced Sunday school building erected in 1962.
