= Trinity Communion Church =

Anglican church in Irondequoit, New York, US

- Trinity Communion Church
- 43.2185°N 77.6086°W
- Address: 759 Winona Boulevard, Irondequoit, New York
- Country: United States
- Denomination: Anglican Church in North America
- Website: trinitycommunion.org

History
- Former name: All Saints Episcopal Church
- Founded: 2004
- Dedication: The Trinity

Architecture
- Style: Gothic Revival
- Completed: 1927

Administration
- Diocese: Christ Our Hope

Clergy
- Rector: Eric Ockrin

Trinity Communion Church (TCC) is an Anglican church in Irondequoit, New York, United States. Founded in 2004 as part of the Charismatic Episcopal Church, the congregation has been part of the Anglican Church in North America (ACNA) since 2024. In 2007, the church acquired its building in Irondequoit, which was built in 1927 for All Saints Episcopal Church. All Saints later left the Episcopal Church during the Anglican realignment, and the building was the subject of a lawsuit by the Episcopal Diocese of Rochester.

== History ==
=== Church building ===
The impetus for a new mission church in Irondequoit came in 1924, and services of the new mission began on All Saints' Day, November 1, 1925, at the Masonic temple. Services were later held at Seneca School. The cornerstone for the building was laid in September 1927 and the building was completed in December of that year. Notable early members included Judge John Van Voorhis.

At the beginning of the 21st century, in protest over the 2003 decision by the Episcopal Church's General Convention to consent to the election of partnered gay cleric Gene Robinson as a bishop, All Saints began withholding its assessments to the Diocese of Rochester.

In November 2005, the diocesan convention voted to dissolve All Saints as a result of the impasse over the $16,000 in unpaid assessments, and Bishop Jack McKelvey ordered the parish to turn over its property to the diocese. All Saints refused to vacate the property. In March 2006, the Episcopal diocese filed suit against All Saints, which had affiliated itself with the Church of Uganda. A state Supreme Court judge ruled in favor of the diocese later that year,

After this ruling, All Saints vacated the building for rented quarters in Rochester and eventually joined the nascent ACNA. Following the departure from the building, the church appealed the ruling, which resulted in the lower court being upheld by the New York Court of Appeals in October 2008. As of 2025, All Saints Anglican Church is part of the Anglican Diocese of the Great Lakes and meets in rented space in Greece, New York.

=== History of Trinity Communion Church ===
Trinity Communion Church was founded by a group of former Presbyterians in 2004 as part of the Charismatic Episcopal Church, which is unaffiliated with the Episcopal Church. It initially met at St. John Fisher University.

In July 2007, TCC purchased the former All Saints building from the Diocese of Rochester for $475,000. Its then-100 members moved into the building in September. In 2009, the church erected a 10 feet (3.0 m) papier-mâché pink elephant on its front lawn to attract attention from the surrounding community and draw interest. "You can't ignore a pink elephant, just like you can't ignore God," then-pastor Robert Dalgliesh said.

In 2024, TCC was received into the ACNA's Diocese of Christ Our Hope.

== Architecture ==
The main church building has three stories and includes a sanctuary, fellowship hall and youth center. A two-story wing includes church offices, a library and a children's education space.

== Churchmanship ==
Trinity Communion Church represents the charismatic tradition within Anglicanism. The congregation offers a quarterly service in Swahili for its contingent of Congolese refugee parishioners, and it hosts a Sudanese congregation.
