= Trinity Church (Wenatchee, Washington) =

Anglican church in Wenatchee, Washington, US

- Wenatchee Brethren Baptist Church
- Trinity Church
- 47.4154°N 120.3137°W
- Location: Wenatchee, Washington
- Address: 585 South Okanogan Street
- Country: United States
- Denomination: Anglican Church in North America
- Previous denomination: Church of the Brethren and American Baptist Churches USA
- Website: trinitywenatchee.org

History
- Former name: Wenatchee Evangelical Fellowship
- Founded: 1995
- Founder: Gene Helsel

Architecture
- Style: Gothic Revival
- Groundbreaking: 1923
- Completed: 1929
- Construction cost: $85,000 ($1.59 million in 2025)

Specifications
- Capacity: 603

Administration
- Diocese: Rocky Mountains

Clergy
- Rector: Matt Canlis

Trinity Church is an Anglican church in Wenatchee, Washington. It is part of the Diocese of the Rocky Mountains in the Anglican Church in North America.

Trinity Church was founded in 1995 as Wenatchee Evangelical Fellowship under the sponsorship of the church in Moscow, Idaho that eventually became Christ Church, and in 1997 it became a founding member of the denomination later known as the Communion of Reformed Evangelical Churches (CREC). The church adopted its present name in 2000. Trinity later left the CREC, and after several years as a non-denominational church, Trinity joined the ACNA.

In 2022, Trinity Church purchased the church building it had rented for over a decade. The church was built from 1923 to 1929 for the Wenatchee Valley Church of the Brethren, which later merged with a Baptist church and became known as the Wenatchee Brethren Baptist Church (WBBC). After a century of ministry in Wenatchee, WBBC had an aging and shrinking membership and chose to sell the building to Trinity and lease back space for its Sunday services.

== History ==
=== History of the building ===
Construction on the Wenatchee Valley Church of the Brethen c. 1927

The Wenatchee Valley Church of the Brethren was organized in 1922. It acquired land at the corner of Okanogan Avenue and Peachey Street and began building the church in 1923, with many of the church's members contributing volunteer labor. Once the foundation was completed, the church held services under a temporary roof until funds were raised to complete the building. Construction resumed in 1926, and the finished building—at a cost of $85,000 ($1.59 million in 2025)—was dedicated in January 1929.

In 1970, the Wenatchee Valley Church of the Brethren merged with Immanuel Baptist Church, forming Wenatchee Brethren Baptist Church United (WBBC). WBBC created a child care center for low-income families in 1989 that operated for 25 years. It also helped build Garden Terrace, a subsidized housing facility in Wenatchee. The church also provided support for Laotian refugees in Wenatchee in the 1970s. In the 2000s, WBBC hosted a Slavic evangelical church serving religious refugees from the Soviet Union who had settled in the Columbia River valley.

By 2022, WBBC's membership had declined to 75 with an average age of 77, and the church had been without a pastor for a year. The congregation voted to sell the church to its longtime tenant, Trinity Church, for approximately 10 percent of its appraised value of $1.7 million ($1.87 million in 2025). WBBC continued to meet, renting space from Trinity but no longer responsible for maintaining the building. WBBC remained dually affiliated with the Church of the Brethren and American Baptist Churches USA.

=== History of Trinity ===
Wenatchee Evangelical Fellowship was organized in 1995 under founding pastor Gene Helsel. In 1996, Helsel petitioned the elders of Community Evangelical Fellowship (later Christ Church) in Moscow, Idaho, to oversee the congregation. WEF ratified the constitution of the Confederation of Reformed Evangelicals (later the Communion of Reformed Evangelical Churches, or CREC) in 1997 and in 1998 was one of three founding churches at the CREC's first presbytery meeting, along with Community Evangelical Fellowship and a church in Bellevue, Washington. In 2000, WEF changed its name to Trinity Church.

By 2011, the congregation had begun meeting at the Wenatchee Brethren Baptist Church. Matt Canlis, a Church of Scotland minister, was called as an interim pastor of Trinity in 2013 and stayed on. From 2014 to 2019, Trinity Church was unaffiliated with a denomination. In 2019, it joined the Anglican Church in North America's Diocese of the Rocky Mountains. By 2022, it approximately 250 members. That year, Trinity Church purchased the Wenatchee Brethren Baptist Church building, where it had met for many years. Trinity planned to reopen the sanctuary's balcony and create better lighting in the church's narthex.

== Architecture ==
When it was completed in 1929, the church had seating for 603 in the auditorium, as well as 22 assembly and classrooms capable of accommodating up to 700 Sunday school students. The church had a social hall and kitchen in the lower level. The auditorium featured opalescent stained-glass windows and individual cushioned seats instead of pews.
