= St. Bartholomew's Anglican Church (Tonawanda, New York) =

Anglican church in Tonawanda, New York, United States

Coordinates: 42°58′55″N 78°49′42″W

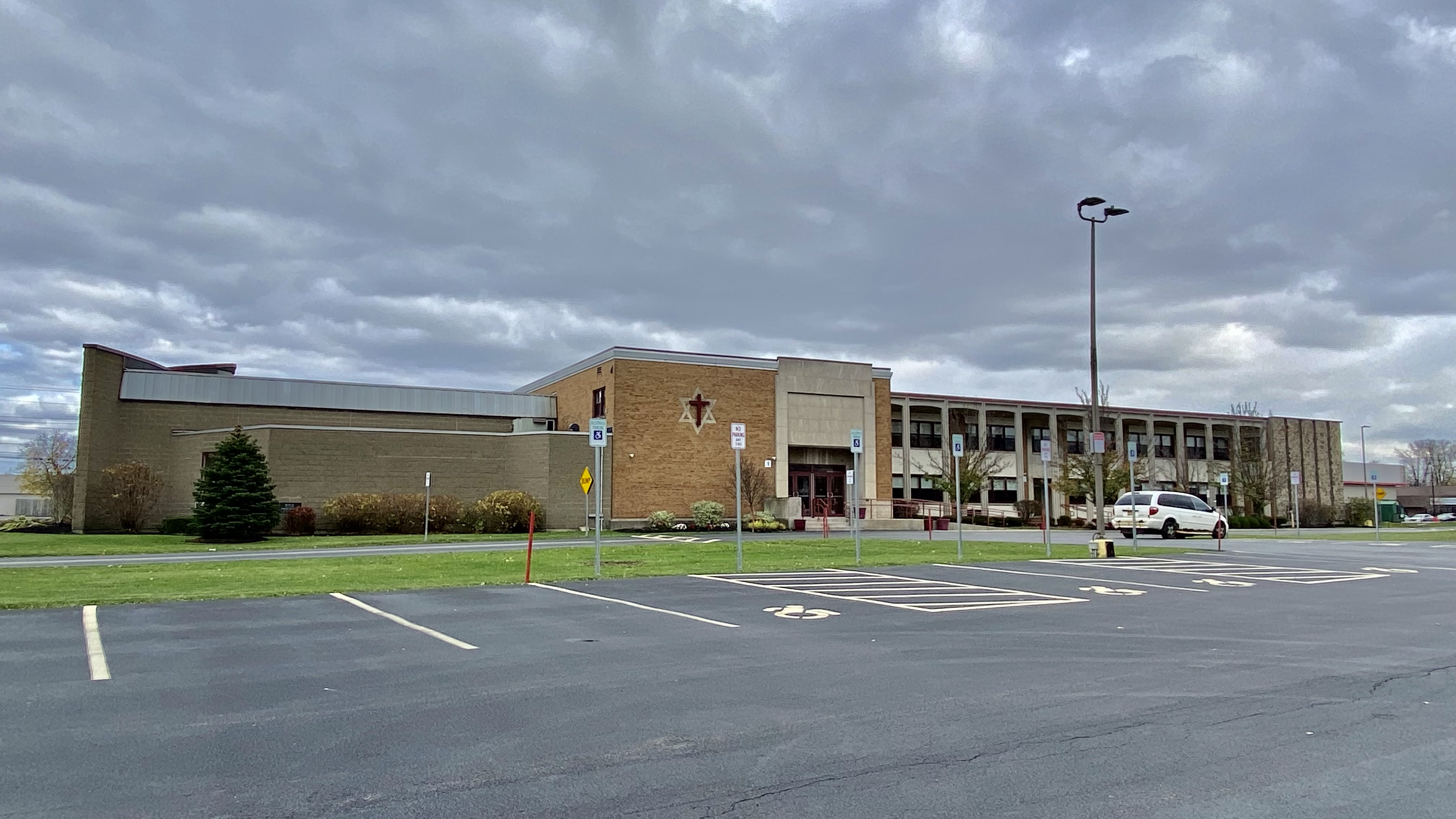
- Location: Tonawanda, New York
- Country: United States
- Denomination: Anglican Church in North America
- Website: www.stbartston.org

History
- Founded: 2008

Architecture
- Architect: Louis Greenstein
- Style: New Formalism
- Years built: 1960–1961

Administration
- Diocese: Christ Our Hope

Clergy
- Rector: The Rev. Arthur Ward

St. Bartholomew's Anglican Church (known colloquially as "St. Bart's") is an Anglican church in Tonawanda, New York. It is the pro-cathedral of the International Diocese in the Anglican Church in North America. The congregation is a successor to St. Bartholomew's Episcopal Church, founded in the Diocese of Western New York in 1955. In 2008, the clergy and members of St. Bart's left the Episcopal Church during the Anglican realignment and founded the current congregation, which now occupies the former site of Temple Beth-El in Tonawanda.

== History ==
=== History of St. Bart's ===
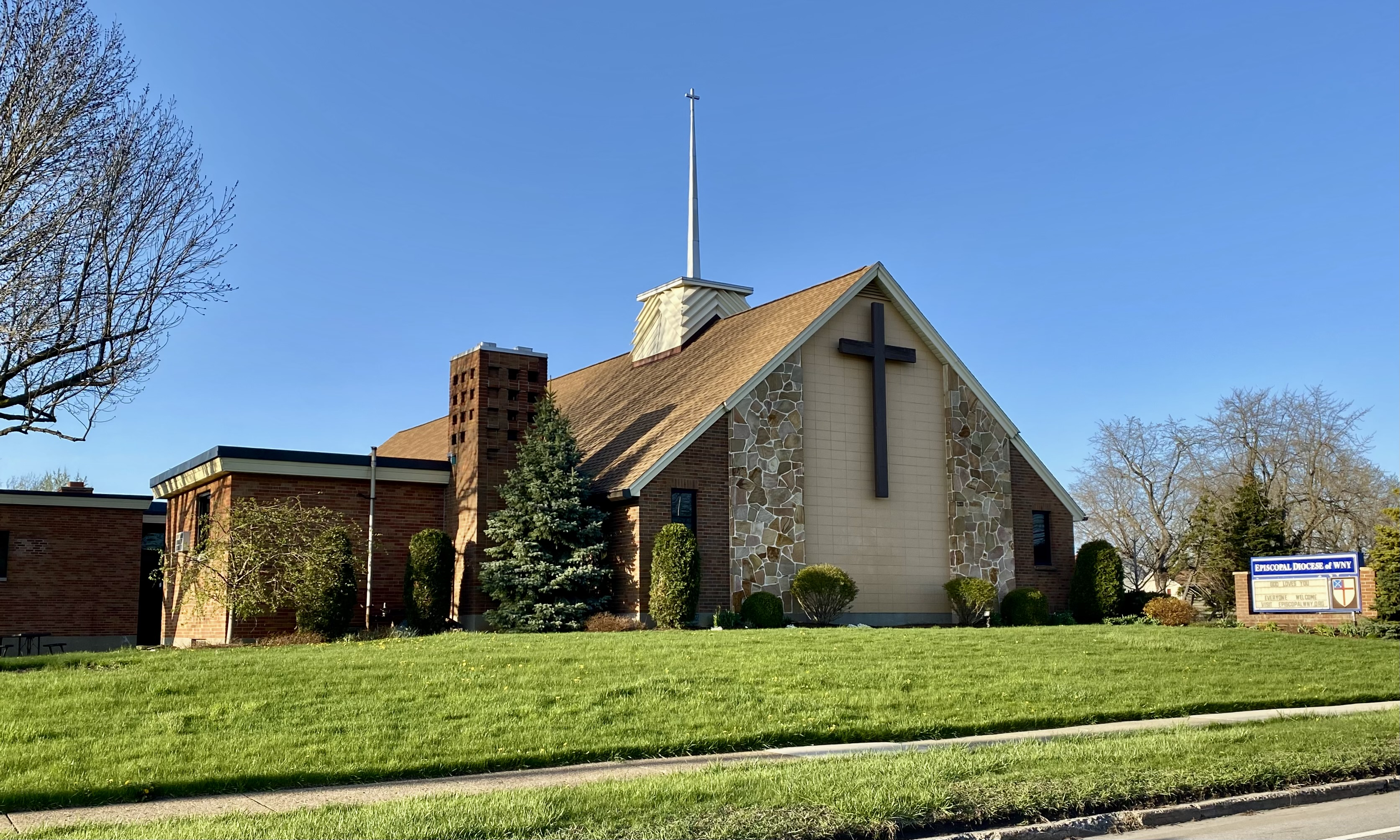
The former site of St. Bartholomew's Episcopal Church, now the diocesan headquarters for the Diocese of Western New York.

St. Bartholomew's Episcopal Church was founded in 1955 in Tonawanda. A permanent modern building designed by A. John Ort was dedicated in 1959. By 2008, the church was one of the largest churches in the Episcopal Diocese of Western New York, with more than 1,000 members and average attendance of 500, accounting for nearly 10 percent of the diocese's Sunday attendance.

St. Bart's was known for its evangelical orientation within the diocese, and in 2003, after the controversial consecration of Gene Robinson to the episcopate, the church began withholding funds for the diocese. In 2008, the congregation voted nearly unanimously to leave the Episcopal Church and not seek to retain its building. A newly established corporation led by members of St. Bart's purchased the former Temple Beth-El for $750,000.

The Episcopal diocese attempted to plant a church called Holy Apostles in the former St. Bart's building, but the church plant was unsuccessful and closed in December 2009. At that point the diocese took over the building as a headquarters and ministry center.

St. Bart's was a founding congregation of the ACNA's International Diocese from 2008 until the diocese's dissolution in 2024, at which time it joined the Diocese of Christ Our Hope.

=== History of the Temple Beth-El building ===
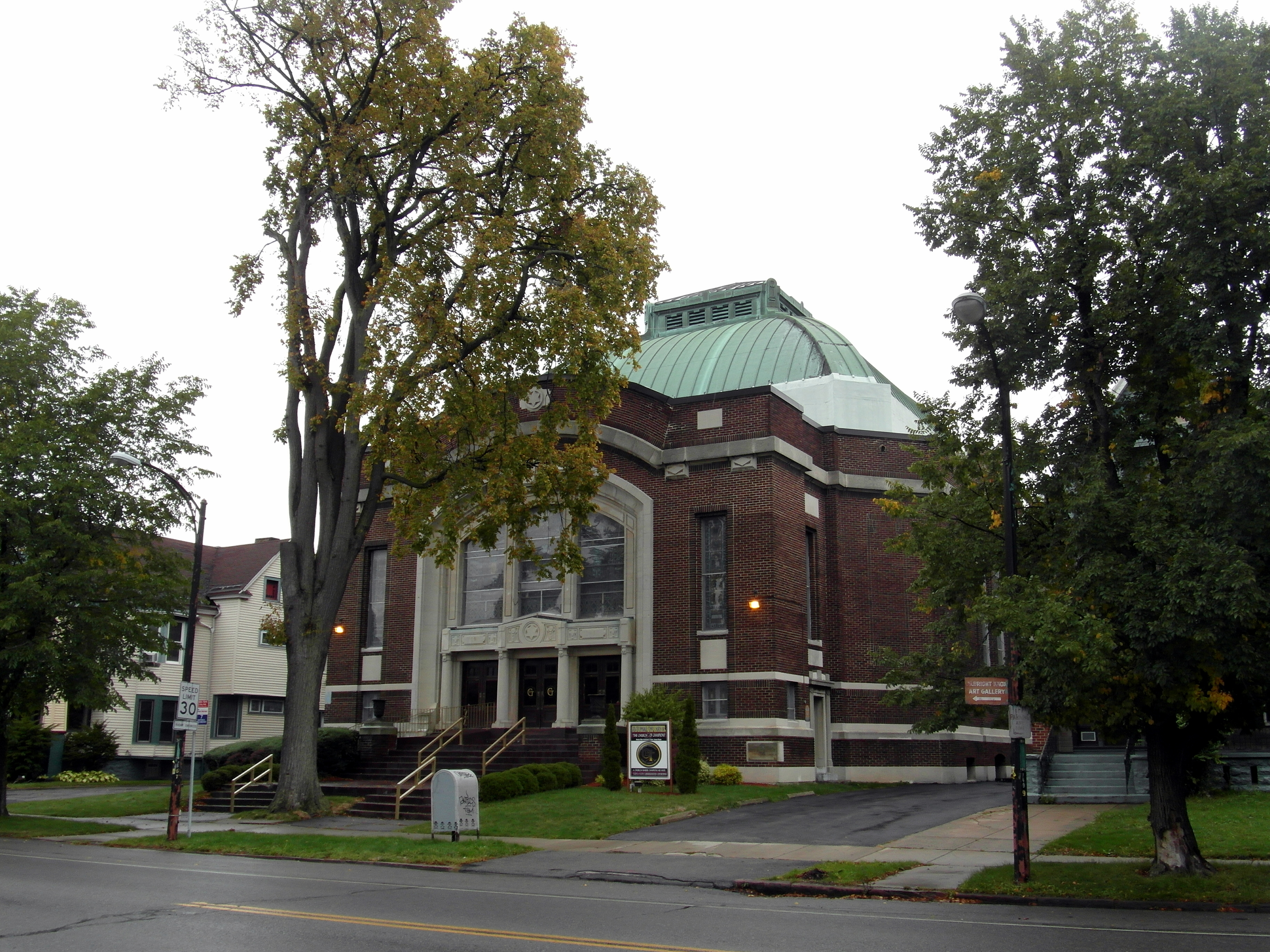
The former location (from 1911 to 1966) of Temple Beth-El on Richmond Avenue in Buffalo.

St. Bart's current building was dedicated in 1961 as a school for Temple Beth-El, which dated back to 1847 as the first Jewish congregation in the Buffalo area. A group of Polish and German Jewish immigrants founded a "moderate" Orthodox congregation that rented space until 1850. Buoyed by a bequest from philanthropist Judah Touro, Congregation Beth-El built a synagogue on Elm Street in 1873 and moved to a West Side site on Richmond Avenue in 1911. At this location, Temple Beth-El became a major center of Jewish religious and social life in Buffalo.

However, during the mid-20th century, the relocation of many temple members to the suburbs pushed the congregation to relocate. Temple Beth-El dedicated a school, designed in the New Formalist style by Louis Greenstein, on Eggert Road in Tonawanda. A sanctuary was added in 1966, and the final service was held at Richmond Avenue. Temple Beth-El was the site of the Kadimah School of Buffalo, the United Jewish High School of Jewish Studies, and Tikvah, a combined congregational religious school. In the late 1990s and early 2000s, temple membership declined, and Beth-El voted to merge with Temple Shaarey Zedek to form Temple Beth Tzedek and sell the Eggert Road building to St. Bart's.

== Ministries ==
St. Bart's remains a large church in the evangelical Anglican tradition with Bible studies, home groups, and prayer meetings. The church has ministry partnerships with Heifer International, Operation Christmas Child, and Anglican Global Missions.
