= Christian Ministers' Association =

The Christian Ministers' Association (CMA) is a Canadian Pentecostal group of over 450 members. The CMA originates from the Pentecostal movement of the early 20th century. It is not a traditional Christian denomination, but "a relational networking of friends and colleagues." As a Pentecostal fellowship, CMA believes in the Pentecostal distinctive of baptism in the Holy Spirit with the evidence of speaking in tongues.

== Objectives ==
The objectives of the fellowship are threefold:

1. The propagation of the gospel of Jesus Christ.
2. To provide united support to the doctrines of Scriptures as are outlined in the statement of faith.
3. To provide government credentials and to encourage and strengthen accepted ministers who wish to function within the framework of a ministerial fellowship, rather than a denominational organization of churches.

== History ==
Like many Pentecostal denominations, the CMA originates from the exponential growth of the modern Pentecostal movement of the early 20th century. As the early Pentecostalism movement rapidly expanded, multiple Pentecostal denominations sprung up to help sustain the movement. Of these groups, the Evangelical Churches of Pentecost (ECP), originated in a town called Radville, Saskatchewan, under the leadership of Alan H. Gillett and David Bradley. These two men mobilized a group of ministers and churches under a provincial charter titled Full Gospel Mission. As the denomination grew, it founded a Bible School in Eston, Saskatchewan on 6 November 1944 called the Full Gospel Bible Institute, and it also began sending missionaries to other countries. So much growth took place in the first decade that the provincial charter had to be expanded to other Canadian provinces. Because of the inter-provincial growth, the Full Gospel Mission sought a Dominion Charter in 1944 and incorporated under the Canadian private act for Religious and Charitable Organizations in 1946 with the new title Evangelical Churches of Pentecost (ECP).

In 1953, the ECP merged with the Apostolic Church of Pentecost (ACOP) another early (1921) Canadian Pentecostal denomination. The reason for the merger was motivated by “the belief that walking together in unity and fellowship is the heart of God.” In spite of the merger with ACOP and the fact that most ECP members switched over to the ACOP denomination, ECP retained its charter so that its members could finalize any outstanding business items. Ironically, the charter for ECP was never dissolved, and the name was changed again in 1967 to The Christian Minister's Association (CMA).

== Beliefs ==
The doctrinal position of the CMA is based in a classical Pentecostal and an evangelical framework. The CMA holds to

- A tri-unity perspective on the Godhead
- The verbal inspiration of the accepted canon of the Bible as originally given
- The total depravity of humanity
- The need for all of humanity to hear the gospel and turn to Christ in faith for redemption.
- Baptism by immersion in the name of the Lord Jesus Christ.
- The reality of a spiritual realm, which includes God, Heaven, Satan, a final judgment, etc.
- Communion practiced as a memorial of Christ's death and resurrection.

As a Pentecostal fellowship, the CMA believes in the Pentecostal distinctive of baptism in the Holy Spirit with the evidence of speaking in tongues. It also believes in the present day use of other spiritual gifts, such as divine healing.
