= Apostolic Women's Ministries =

Apostolic Women's Ministries (AWM) is a Canadian ministry under the Apostolic Church of Pentecost (ACOP) designed to help coordinate opportunities for ACOP women to work together to support each other and ACOP's missionaries.

== History ==
Originally, the group started in 1959 as the Apostolic Ladies Missionary Fellowship (ALMF). In its founding, it was designed to coordinate the efforts of various ministries already in existence, which provided missionary families with support. By coordinating these various groups, they were able to provide more equal support for the various missionaries. Another role that the ALMF played in its early years to support missionaries was the operation of Central Cupboard, which facilitated donations of blankets and other household goods to be distributed to missionary families on return from their travels.

The ALMF also published a print publication called Harvest Time, but due to rising postage costs, it switched to an electronic newsletter in the 1990s with a new name: For Such A Time as This. ALMF officially became Apostolic Women's Ministries (AWM) in 1987. It continues to function as an organization involved in missions by participating in ACOP's semi-annual Missions Committee Strategy Meetings. In 2005, ACOP historian, Linda Wegner defined the goal of AWM "to meet the changing needs of today's women."

== Objectives ==
The most recent publication that speaks of the AWM is the March 2008 publication of FellowshipFOCUS (a publication of ACOP), the objectives of AWM were laid out for the modern ACOP woman. The most recent stated aims of the organization are very similar to its historical emphasis on supporting missionaries, and are listed below:

- To encourage women to go into the missions field "to encourage missionaries and assist them in any manner required."
- The revitalization of the group's newsletter, which aims to provide "a means of mentoring, releasing and informing as we attempt to bridge the gaps across Canada and with our missionaries."
- The establishment of a national project called Widow Watch intending "to assist widows who have lost their husbands to the AIDS/HIV crises in the countries of Malawi, Zambia and Zimbabwe."
- Hosting women's retreats.
