= Anglican Diocese of Christ Our Hope =

Anglican diocese in the United States

Location
- Ecclesiastical province: Anglican Church in North America

Statistics
- Parishes: 55 (2025)
- Members: 8,966 (2025)

Information
- Rite: Anglican

Current leadership
- Bishop ordinary: Alan J. Hawkins
- Suffragan: R. Quigg Lawrence, Paul Donison
- Bishops emeritus: Steve Breedlove

Website
- Official Website

The Anglican Diocese of Christ Our Hope is a diocese of the Anglican Church in North America. The diocese originated from the dissolution of the Missionary District of PEARUSA, which resulted in the creation of two new dioceses, both admitted at the ACNA at their General Council on 21 June 2016. It has at least 51 parishes in 12 American states, which are Connecticut, Maine, Maryland, Massachusetts, New Jersey, New York, North Carolina, Ohio, Pennsylvania, Texas Virginia, and West Virginia, and in Washington, D.C. The state with most parishes is North Carolina, with 11. The diocese's bishop ordinary is Alan J. Hawkins, since 2024, with Quigg Lawrence as the suffragan bishop.

== History ==
PEARUSA was created in 2012 as the missionary organization of the Province of the Anglican Church of Rwanda in the United States and Canada, a dual jurisdiction of his African mother church and the Anglican Church in North America. PEARUSA was divided in three regional networks, Mid-Atlantic and Northeast, Southwest and West. The Synod of the province of the Anglican Church of Rwanda decided to fully transfer the jurisdiction of PEARUSA to the ACNA on 23 September 2015. This took place at ACNA's Provincial Council, held on 21 June 2016, with two dioceses being created, the Anglican Diocese of Christ Our Hope, who took over the Mid-Atlantic and Northeast Network, and the Anglican Diocese of the Rocky Mountains, who substituted the Southwest Network.

The diocese is dispersed across a large part of the Mid-Atlantic and Northeast regions of the United States, and one of its main purposes is church planting.

In 2024, the Diocese of Christ Our Hope absorbed several congregations from the dissolving International Diocese, including St. Bartholomew's Anglican Church and also formed the Great Plains Missionary District, which was created with a goal of incubating a new ACNA diocese in Kansas, Nebraska, Oklahoma and northeast Texas. With this move, Christ Church, the provincial pro-cathedral in Plano, Texas, joined the diocese.

== Parishes ==
In 2025, the Diocese of Christ Our Hope, including the Great Plains Missionary District, reported 55 congregations (up 67% from 2022) with 8,966 members (up 74% from 2022) and average Sunday attendance of 7,915 (up 89% from 2022), making it the third-largest diocese in the province by attendance. Notable parishes in the Diocese of Christ Our Hope include:

Church	Image	City	Year founded	Year completed	Notes
Christ Church		Plano, Texas	1985		Part of Great Plains Missionary District
Church of the Holy Spirit		Roanoke, Virginia	1985	1998	
Hope Church		Charleston, West Virginia	2017	1915	Historic district contributing property
St. Bartholomew's Anglican Church		Tonawanda, New York	2008	1961	
Trinity Communion Church		Irondequoit, New York	2004	1927	
