= International Diocese =

Location
- Ecclesiastical province: Anglican Church in North America

Statistics
- Parishes: 14 (2023)
- Members: 2,107 (2023)

Information
- Rite: Anglican
- Established: 2009
- Dissolved: July 1, 2024
- Cathedral: St. Bartholomew's Anglican Church (pro-cathedral), Tonawanda

Leadership
- Bishop: Bill Atwood

Website
- Archived version of official website

The International Diocese was a diocese of the Anglican Church in North America, comprising, at its dissolution, 14 congregations in 6 American states: Colorado, Kentucky, New York, Oklahoma, Tennessee, and Texas. The diocesan office was located in Carrollton, Texas. The congregations stretch from Texas to New York.

== History ==
The International Diocese was a founding member of the Anglican Church in North America in 2009, with Bill Atwood as its first bishop. The International Diocese originated from the fact that many congregations in the United States were under the authority of foreign Anglican churches. One of these was the Anglican Church of Kenya, where Atwood served as a suffragan bishop at the All Saints Cathedral Diocese in Nairobi and of the Missionary Convocation of Kenya in the United States. As regional dioceses formed in ACNA, some congregations remained in the non-geographical International Diocese to fund Atwood's position as dean of international affairs for the province.

Atwood announced his intention to retire in June 2024, in advance of which date congregations in the transitional diocese discerned their future homes in other ACNA dioceses. In conjunction with Atwood's retirement, the diocese was formally dissolved effective July 1, 2024.
