= Apostolic Church of Pentecost =

Pentecostal denomination

- ACOP's logo is a woven abstract globe that illustrates interconnectedness.
- Classification: Protestant
- Theology: Finished Work Pentecostal
- Governance: Members attending a bi-annual General Conference elect a president to carry out the work of ACOP's Mission, Vision, and Core Values.
- Associations: Pentecostal/Charismatic Churches of North America
- Region: International
- Founder: Rev. Frank Small
- Origin: 1921
- Separated from: Pentecostal Assemblies of Canada 1921
- Absorbed: Evangelical Churches of Pentecost 1953
- Congregations: 85 in Canada 3000 worldwide
- Members: 24,000 in Canada worldwide unknown
- Official website: ACOP.ca

The Apostolic Church of Pentecost (ACOP) is a Finished Work Pentecostal Christian denomination with origins in the Pentecostal revival of the early 20th century. Although multi-national, ACOP has its strongest membership in Canada. In 2002 ACOP reported "approximately 24,000 members in Canada, with 450 ministers and 153 churches." In 2024, ACOP had 90 churches in Canada with a large percentage of these being in Alberta, Saskatchewan and British Columbia. ACOP's headquarters is in Calgary, Alberta.

== Structure ==
Unlike traditional denominations that are usually based on top-down organizational structures, ACOP describes itself as a "fellowship." The different term emphasizes that ACOP originated as a "grass-roots organization with a minimal amount of organization." This kind of organizational structure allows local churches to work autonomously, under the umbrella of ACOP's covering but without a head office dictating what each church must do, or the programs it must offer.

== Beliefs ==
Theologically, ACOP is in the Pentecostal tradition of Protestant Christianity, and aligns itself with the evangelical movement.

The ACOP considers that the Biblical inspiration of the Bible makes it the authoritative and infallible written word of God. It believes that there is one God who is Father, Son, and Holy Spirit; in the virgin birth of Jesus; that Jesus is humanity's only possible savior; in the total depravity of humanity; that all of humanity needs to hear the gospel and turn to Christ in faith for redemption; in the reality of a spiritual realm, which includes God, Heaven, Satan, the personal return of Jesus Christ, and a final judgment; in communion; and in baptism by immersion.

As a Pentecostal fellowship, the ACOP believes in the Pentecostal distinctive of baptism in the Holy Spirit with the evidence of speaking in tongues. ACOP teaches that this experience is subsequent to the experience of salvation, and leads to a "Spirit filled life." ACOP believes that the Holy Spirit is the catalyst for sanctification. It believes in the present-day use of other spiritual gifts, such as divine healing. ACOP view is that marriage is "a life-long exclusive commitment between one man and one woman". In 2006 ACOP signed an official Joint Declaration on Marriage affirming this position with over 40 different religious groups in Canada.

== History ==
=== Historical precursors (1906-1920) ===
Like many Pentecostal denominations, the ACOP originates from the modern Pentecostal movement of the early 20th century from the Azusa street revival in Los Angeles. As the early Pentecostalism movement expanded into Canada, there was an unsuccessful attempt in 1909 to organize Canadian Pentecostals. In 1918 a decision was made to form the Pentecostal Assemblies of Canada (PAOC), and a dominion charter was granted on May 17, 1919.

The PAOC organization held to three distinctive beliefs: to William Durham's Finished Work of Calvary doctrine, to the Oneness doctrine of the Godhead, and to water baptism in Jesus' Name. However, due to disagreement on these issues, the early unity of the PAOC did not last long. Shortly after the charter was granted, a group of ministers and churches withdrew their support because of doctrinal disagreement, especially over the oneness doctrine and baptism in Jesus' name. This group aligned itself with the US organization, the Assemblies of God. By 1920, the PAOC itself merged with the AOG, shifting its theological stance toward a more Trinitarian viewpoint.

=== Origins of ACOP (1920-1950) ===
On 1 January 1920 Rev. Frank Small, a member of PAOC, wrote a letter to his organization stating "if you feel that I am unworthy of your further fellowship owing to my doctrinal stand, I shall leave my further fellowship to your judgment as to whether I am recognized as one of you" (the doctrinal differences are later clarified in Small's private correspondence as his belief in the finished work and the oneness doctrine). This letter was not recognized in any formal capacity by the PAOC, but Frank Small's name was removed from the next PAOC ministerial list.

Small then founded a new Pentecostal denomination, called the Apostolic Church of Pentecost, which was granted Dominion charter on 25 October 1921. "With the doctrinal break in fellowship, he founded an organization that for many years endured as the only native Canadian Oneness organization." Small believed strongly that organization should never take precedence over Scripture. A big part of Small's focus was a belief that "God was bypassing the 'old denominations' and restoring the pure apostolic truth and practice to the church in the last days before the return of Christ."

He considered that the oneness of the Godhead was being revealed. He published a paper called Living Waters in which he said that the Trinitarians had given Christ an "inferiority complex in the eyes of the world" by "separating Christ from his fatherhood." He also said that "Any teaching that minimizes the Lord Jesus Christ to second place in the Godhead in authority or power, is to be laid at the door of the enemy."

The first ACOP conference took place in Winnipeg, Manitoba, in 1921, where Frank Small was elected the first moderator. Early in its history, the ACOP focused on three main things: missions work, a small publication called Living Waters (produced by Small), and the need for Bible training. During its early years, ACOP saw tremendous growth, including: "new churches planted, missionaries thrust out into the work of God, Bible Schools established, denominational material published and Camp ministries started."

However, in 1946, ACOP experienced a decline in Eastern Canada. ACOP had previously established a presence in the Maritime provinces, but challenges related to theology and geography led to the departure of several congregations. Theologically, ACOP held Calvinist doctrines, which conflicted with the Arminian beliefs more common among Maritime Pentecostals, many of whom were influenced by the Holiness tradition. Additionally, the long distance from ACOP’s western Canadian base made organizational cohesion difficult. As a result, some of the Maritime churches withdrew from ACOP and aligned with the newly formed United Pentecostal Church in the United States, citing greater theological and geographic compatibility.

=== Merger (1950-1953) ===
In 1950 an interfellowship meeting was held in Calgary, Alberta, between the ACOP and another Pentecostal denomination called the Evangelical Churches of Pentecost (ECP). At this meeting it was determined that an amalgamation should take place between the two groups. One possible motive for the merger is described by ACOP historian Linda Wegner as "the realization that by blending two structures into one, they could expand their spheres of influence and hopefully, their effectiveness of ministry would increase proportionally." The merger process took some time to work itself out, as a variety of questions had to be answered. Both denominations had their own camps, bible schools, policies on how to support missions, and consequently, much discussion was necessary before the merger could become a reality. Nevertheless, on May 29, 1953, the merger was officially in place. Despite the fact that almost all members of the ECP switched their membership over to the ACOP, the ECP charter was never dissolved, and is currently employed by a group called the Christian Ministers' Association.

=== Post-Merger Years (1954-Present) ===
Before the merger with ECP, there were approximately 80 churches in the ACOP. After the merger, the ACOP experienced an increase in churches. In the decade from 1951 to 1961 ACOP had a growth spurt of about 40 new churches (compared to only about 20 in each of the previous three decades). From 1960 to 1980, growth went down but this trend was reversed in the late 1970s and early 1980s. Since that time there has been positive growth, and there are now about 150 churches a part of ACOP.

After the merger, ACOP's growth prompted a desire to organize various departments to help stimulate further growth. Some of these include: Apostolic Women's Ministries (AWM), Apostolic Youth Ministries (AYM), and the Apostolic Missions Division. More recently, there has been a shift away from providing departmental direction, toward making the departments into "resource centers" designed to empower people in their own churches to serve in individualized contexts. The main ACOP ministries that serve in this way are described in the section below on Divisional Ministries.

== Divisional Ministries ==
=== Apostolic Women's Ministries ===
The role of women in ACOP has always been important. Officially, women can hold leadership roles within ACOP, and several have been ordained into the pastorate. There was also a formal organization within ACOP that provided venues for women within ACOP to work together to support each other and work on common projects. This organization was called Apostolic Women's Ministries (AWM).

=== Missions Division ===
The Apostolic Missions Division finds its origins early in ACOP's history, and its stated purpose is "to evangelize people throughout the world with the goal of establishing indigenous local churches, to train national leadership, and to support any aspect of missionary work." Supporting missionaries has been at the heart of ACOP's interests from the fellowship's earliest years. Although it is hard to know for certain how many missionaries have been sent out by ACOP over the years, ACOP historian, Linda Wegner reports that from 1921 to 2001, there were at least 226 missionaries sent out to many different nations. As a result of ACOP's missionary activity "there are 18 national organizations in 16 countries that are affiliated with the Apostolic Church of Pentecost of Canada", and "there are approximately 3000 ACOP churches worldwide."

==== Orphan Care ====
Orphan Care is a partnership between ACOP and its affiliated churches in Africa. The goal of the partnership is to care for orphans who have lost their parents due to the AIDS/HIV crises. Since there are "many Christian families in Africa who are willing to take orphans into their homes but are prevented from doing so because they are financially unable" ACOP is trying to find donors who will provide the funds necessary for these families to care for orphans in their own homes. The cost for the program is "between $1.00 and $1.50 per day" which provides "food, clothing, education and basic medical care in a Christian home for an orphan in Africa." Every donor receives a picture of one of the African children being cared for in this program as a prayer reminder.

One of the reasons the program is set up this way is because the philosophy behind Orphan Care is "that Christian homes provide a more stable and favorable atmosphere than orphanages."

Currently, the program is in operation in both Zimbabwe and Malawi, and approval has been granted to extend the program into Zambia as well.

==== Global Harvest Fund ====
In 1997, ACOP's dream of creating a professionally managed fund to support missionaries became a reality. The fund was specifically designed to help new missionaries get established, but is also intended "to assist missionaries who are supported through the ACOP office to help cover costs such as vehicles for the field, upgrades to computer equipment, airfare, conference fees, etc."

The fund is called the Global Harvest Fund (GHF), and it has two main components: an Endowment Fund and an Operating Fund. All donations to the GHF are divided equally between these two components. All returns on investment in the Endowment Fund are channeled into the Operating Fund.

==== 2020 Vision ====
The 2020 Vision is the name of ACOP's church planting initiative to launch 50 new churches in Canada by 2020, ACOP's centennial year. In order to accomplish this goal, in 2008 ACOP established an endowment fund called the "Daniel and Helen Breen Memorial Church Planting Endowment Fund" of 2 million dollars. The first million was raised by ACOP churches, districts, and individual members, and the second million was a matching gift from Canadian entrepreneur Jim Pattison.

== Associated Ministries ==
=== Organizations ===
- Bridges of Hope, http://www.bridgesofhope.ca/
- Evangelical Fellowship of Canada, http://www.evangelicalfellowship.ca/
- Free Bible Study-Lessons, https://web.archive.org/web/20110318230343/http://www.free-bible-study-lessons.com/free-newsletter.html
- God is Able Ministries, https://web.archive.org/web/20110301010119/http://godisableministries.com/
- Gospel Mission, http://www.gospelmission.net/
- House of the Risen Son
- Linda Wegner (Words of Worth), http://www.wordsofworth.ca/
- King's Heart Ministries, http://www.shoutlife.com/kingsheart
- Oasis Retreats Canada, https://web.archive.org/web/20110228191451/http://www.oasisretreatscanada.com/whatisoasis.php
- House of Judah, http://www.houseofjudah.com/
- The Dwelling Place, http://thedwellingplace.faithweb.com/
- World Relief Canada, http://www.wrcanada.org/

=== ACOP Camps ===
- Cowichan River Bible Camp, http://www.cowichancamp.com/
- Eagle Lake Bible Camp, http://www.eaglelakebiblecamp.org/home.htm
- Kedleston Gospel Camp, http://www.kedlestongospelcamp.com/
- Moose Lake Gospel Camp,
- Pembina Bible Camp, http://pembinabiblecamp.ca/
- Shiloh Bible Camp, http://www.shilohbiblecamp.com/
- Southern Alberta Bible Camp, http://www.sabc.ca/
- Springside Bible Camp, http://www.springsidecamp.com/
- Trossachs Gospel Camp, http://www.trossachscamp.ca/
- Veteran Full Gospel Camp, http://www.veteran-camp.com/
- Victory Bible Camp, http://www.victoryretreatcenter.com/default.asp?Key=1

=== National Groups ===
The following are national groups affiliated with ACOP Canada:

- Full Gospel Praise Centres Malta, https://web.archive.org/web/20110509032104/http://www.fullgospel.eu/home.php
- Apostolic Church of Pentecost of Brazil, http://www.acopbrasil.com.br/
- Apostolic Church of Pentecost of India, http://www.acopindia.com/

=== Publications ===
- FellowshipFOCUS, internet newsletter, discontinued May 2009. Archives available from https://web.archive.org/web/20110210094156/http://www.acop.ca/general/fellowshipfocus.asp.
- This Week In ACOP, a weekly communication from the Apostolic Church of Pentecost of Canada, recapping prayer requests, current events and news items of specific interest to ACOP members & churches. Available from http://www.acop.ca/.

== Moderators/Presidents ==
ACOP originally called the head of the fellowship its "moderator." Recently, this was changed to reflect the more modern term "president."

- Rev. Franklin Small (1921–1952)
- Rev. G. A. Batke (1952–1960)
- Rev. G. S. Mclean (1960–1961)
- Rev. G. A. Batke (1961–1964)
- Rev. E. L. McRae (1964–1968)
- Rev. Lorne Pritchard (1968–1969)
- Rev. Dan Breen (1969–1984)
- Rev. Wes Schindel (1984–1990)
- Rev. G. O. B. Killam (1990–2004)
- Rev. Wes Mills (2004-)

== Educational Institution ==
- Eston College, Regina, Saskatchewan, http://www.estoncollege.ca
