= Eston College =

Christian college in Saskatchewan, Canada

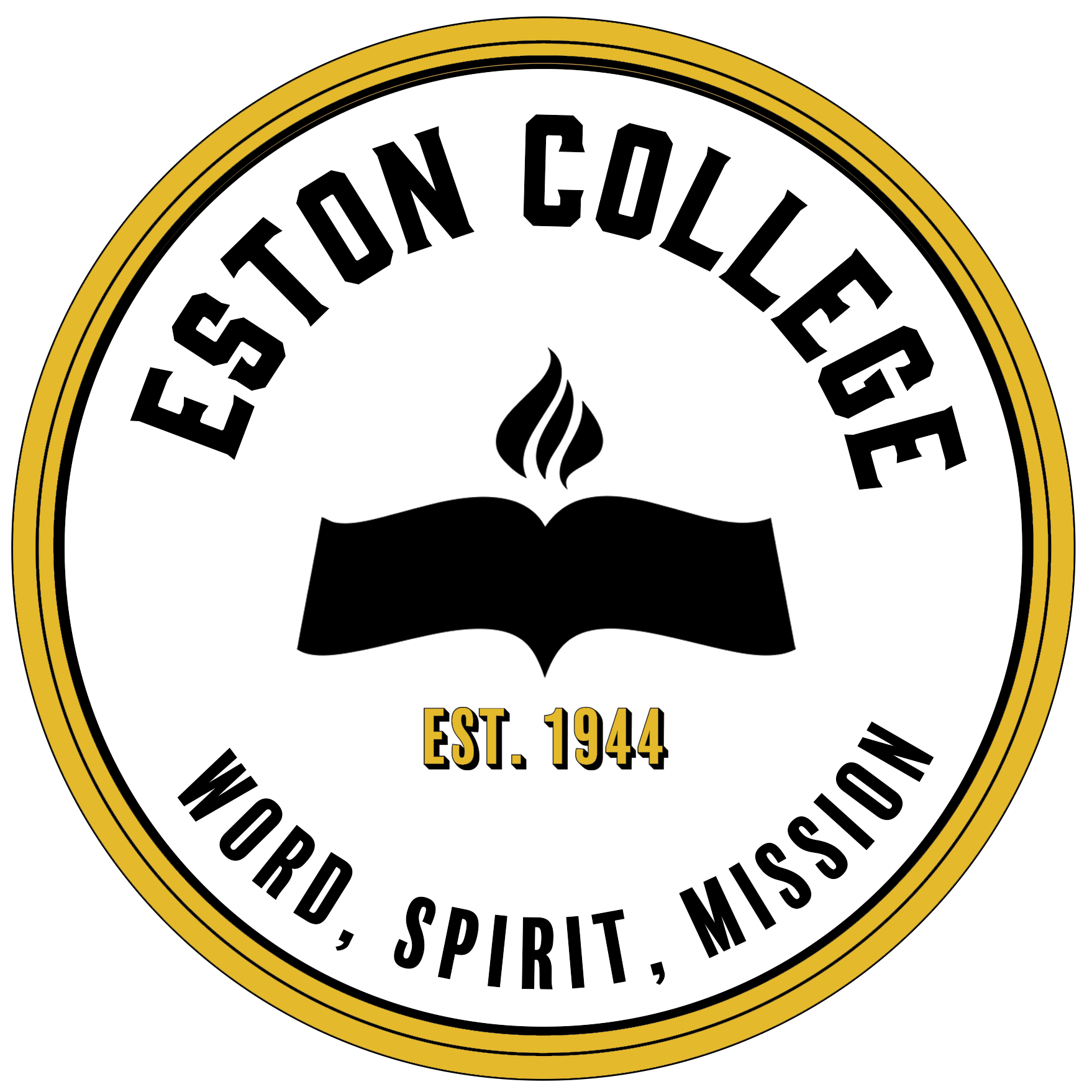
- Former names: Full Gospel Bible Institute (1944-2005); Full Gospel Bible College (2005-2007)
- Motto: To Know the Scriptures and the Power of God to Further the Great Commission
- Type: Bible College
- Established: 1944
- Religious affiliation: ACOP, EFC
- Academic affiliations: ABHE, United Youth Ministries, CCCC, CHEC, CHEA
- President: Sean Steveson-Douglas, President.
- Undergraduates: 50
- Location: 808 Assiniboine Ave E, Regina, Saskatchewan, Canada; 51.1480°N 108.7500°W
- Nickname: Eston Storm
- Sporting affiliations: PAC.
- Website: www.estoncollege.ca

Eston College is a private Christian post-secondary educational institution located in Regina, Saskatchewan, Canada. Since 1944 it has served as the primary training center for the Apostolic Church of Pentecost (ACOP).

== Academics ==
All Eston College courses focus on biblical studies and theology. Eston College is accredited with the Association for Higher Biblical Education (ABHE).

=== Programs offered ===
Eston College offers the following:

- Certificate of Biblical Studies
- Associate Diploma of Biblical Studies
- Bachelor of Christian Ministry
- Bachelor of Biblical Studies
- Bachelor of Arts in Christian Studies
- Bachelor of Arts in Bi-Vocational Studies
- Worship Ministry Minor
- Children & Youth Ministry Minor
- Empower (Discipleship Program)

== History ==
=== Founding ===
In 1944 at a Trossachs Camp meeting, a meeting was called to discuss the location and operation of a Bible school that would serve the churches in the ACOP, which at the time was called the "Full Gospel Missions Fellowship". At this meeting five men were appointed to carry out the work of starting a Bible college for the fellowship. The five men on this committee were Glen McLean, Lorne Pritchard, Ron Burnside, Elmer Powers, and Harold Hollands.

These five men built the foundation for the Full Gospel Bible Institute (FGBI) which opened its doors on November 6, 1944, welcoming six students. Eston was chosen as the location for the Bible School after a number of locations were considered. Some of these were Pangman and Trossachs, SK, and Eston SK. "G. S. McLean's presence at Eston and the local churches willingness to donate a site at Eston may have been factors that tipped the scales."

=== History ===
Situated in the far southeast corner of the small farming community, Eston College began with an old farmhouse and used the Eston Full Gospel Church on the other side of town. The student body grew quickly and by the second term of the 1944–1945 school year, there were 18 students registered. During the early years, G. S. McLean was the Principal with Rev. W. B. Marshall and his wife serving as teachers, the registrar, and the secretary. The early years depended upon adjunct faculty such as Lorne Pritchard, Ern Baxter, and Albert Marshall. The Bible education received in these early years set a precedent for the future of FGBI.

In a meeting in Eston on October 8, 1953, the governing bodies of FGBI and the Apostolic Missionary Training Institute (AMTI) met for the final time to complete the merger of the two Bible schools. The two church fellowships of the ACOP and the Evangelical Churches of Pentecost were already undergoing talks of a merger and it was deemed unnecessary to have two Bible schools. It was decided that AMTI would close down and the students would be transferred to FGBI.

G. S. McLean served as the president of FGBI for 39 years and saw the small prairie Bible school grow from 6 students in its inaugural year to a peak that stands to this day of 187 students in 1976. During this time FGBI also saw its campus develop and other departments open within the institution. Notably FGBI Press, Summer Institute of Missions, the A. D. Marshall Library, The Bible and Science Department, and was host to numerous conferences and gatherings.

In April 1983 the Board of Directors of FGBI appointed Rev. Alan Mortensen as president and Willard Mitchell as vice president. Although G. S. McLean retired as president he became Chancellor of the Full Gospel Bible Institute until his death in 2000. Alan Mortensen would lead FGBI through the next 12 years seeing growth and change take place as time progressed through the eighties and nineties. During Alan Mortensen's tenure as president, there was a devastating fire that destroyed the chapel which led to further campus development, there were new ministry opportunities that were made available, and a flag was adopted for the institution.

In 1997 the College Board of Directors appointed Todd Atkinson, as president. During Atkinson's time at FGBI, there was significant campus development and a newly recognized desire to see the School move toward accreditation so it could offer degrees and transferable credits.

In 1999 Lauren Miller was appointed president. During the 10 years that Lauren Miller was president FGBI changed its name to The Full Gospel Bible College in October 2005, and then again to Eston College in May 2007. The college started to grant Bachelor of Biblical Studies Degrees in 2000, offering diploma upgrades to previous graduates (see academics) and currently enrolled students in a 4-year bachelor's program. Miller guided the college through the eight-year accreditation process with the Association for Biblical Higher Education (ABHE) with the college receiving full 5-year initial accreditation in May 2007.

In 2008, Brian Fuller was appointed president. Under Fuller, the college eliminated its debt and improved its facilities. Fuller guided the college through ABHE re-accreditation and in 2012 the college was given an ABHE recommendation for 10 years. In 2019, Brenda Frost was named the Interim President. In 2020, Sean Stevenson-Douglas returned to Canada after 6 years as a global missions worker in the Near East to become the President of Eston College.

In 2022, a new experiential learning system was implemented. Eston College now operates on a modular learning system. Courses are delivered in modular blocks of three weeks each.

In August 2023, Eston College relocated to Regina, Saskatchewan. Eston College is currently located within Regina Apostolic Church.

== Student life ==
Students at Eston College are generally required to live in College Residences for a portion of their education. Chapel and Community activities are scheduled on a weekly basis promoting personal and spiritual growth. Part of Eston College's mandate is to provide opportunities for ministry and practical life experience. Student Representative Council (SRC) is the student government that provides leadership to students at Eston College. The SRC is involved in curriculum planning, student services, the library development, among other aspects of school leadership. There are workout facilities located in the dorms, Student Services provides intramural floor hockey and other sports/games opportunities for students, and full-time students are able to participate in competitive sports in the Prairie Athletic Conference.

== Presidents ==
There have been six elected presidents of Eston College

- Dr. G. S. McLean (1944–83)
- Rev. Alan Mortensen (1983–97)
- Rev. Todd Atkinson (1997–99)
- Rev. Lauren Miller (1999–2008)
- Rev. Brian Fuller (2008–2019)
- Brenda Frost (Interim) (2019–2020)
- Rev. Sean Stevenson-Douglas (2020–present)

== See also ==
- Pentecostalism
