= PEARUSA =

Missionary District of PEARUSA

Location
- Ecclesiastical province: Anglican Church of Rwanda/Anglican Church in North America

Statistics
- Parishes: 67

Information
- Rite: Anglican

Current leadership
- Bishop: Onesphore Rwaje, archbishop Steve Breedlove, presider

Website
- pearusa.org

PEARUSA was the North American missionary district of the Anglican Church of Rwanda. It took the first part of its name from the acronym for the Rwandan church's official French name (Province de l'Eglise Anglicane au Rwanda or PEAR). PEARUSA was also a sub-jurisdiction of the Anglican Church in North America (ACNA), but on 23 September 2015 the Synod of the Province of the Anglican Church of Rwanda at its regular meeting held at St. Etienne Cathedral in Kigali, Rwanda resolved to fully transfer PEARUSA to the Anglican Church in North America (ACNA) with some of the existing PEARUSA networks becoming full ACNA dioceses by June 2016. Upon the unanimous vote of ACNA's Provincial Council on 21 June 2016, PEARUSA was fully transferred to ACNA with two of the three former PEARUSA networks [Mid-Atlantic and Northeast, West] becoming full ACNA dioceses known respectively as the Anglican Diocese of Christ Our Hope and the Anglican Diocese of the Rocky Mountains. The former PEARUSA Southeast network did not become a full, separate ACNA diocese. According to a decision that had been reached at their clergy meeting and released on 8 February 2016, the 20 parishes of PEARUSA Southeast has folded into the already existing ACNA dioceses.

== History ==
From 2000 to 2011, the Anglican Church in Rwanda provided canonical residence and oversight for the Anglican Mission in the Americas (AMIA). By December 2011, the relationship between the Rwandan House of Bishops and the AMIA Council of Bishops had deteriorated over concerns about vision, long-term plans, and financial transparency. That month, the Rwandan House of Bishops, led by Archbishop Onesphore Rwaje, requested repentance from AMIA chairman Chuck Murphy. On December 5, Murphy and all but two of the other AMIA bishops resigned their orders in PEAR. Murphy retained control of AMIA, which no longer had an affiliation with an Anglican province.

In January 2012, Rwaje, other Rwandan bishops, and the two former AMIA bishops who had not resigned, convened an assembly to explore what would be done next. ACNA Archbishop Robert Duncan attended, and it was determined that both the Rwandan Church and ACNA would work together to accommodate parishes that would seek to be received directly into an existing ACNA diocese, as well as to create a new missionary district that would have canonical "dual citizenship" between ACNA and PEAR and would be called PEARUSA. In this way, PEARUSA is similar to the Convocation of Anglicans in North America, which has dual canonical residence in ACNA and the Church of Nigeria.

In June 2012, ACNA formally received PEARUSA as a sub-jurisdiction. At two subsequent gatherings in 2012, PEARUSA formalized its canons, arranged its parishes into regional networks, and selected future network leaders. On 23 September 2015, the Synod of the Province of the Anglican Church of Rwanda at its regular meeting held at St. Etienne Cathedral, in Kigali, resolved to fully transfer PEARUSA to the Anglican Church in North America jurisdiction with two of the existing three PEARUSA networks becoming full ACNA dioceses by June 2016. Upon the unanimous vote of ACNA's Provincial Council on 21 June 2016, PEARUSA was fully transferred to ACNA with two of the three former PEARUSA networks [Mid-Atlantic and Northeast, West] becoming full ACNA dioceses known respectively as the Anglican Diocese of Christ Our Hope and the Anglican Diocese of the Rocky Mountains. The former PEARUSA Southeast network did not become a full, separate ACNA diocese. According to a decision that had been reached at their clergy meeting and released on 8 February 2016, the 20 parishes of PEARUSA Southeast folded into the already existing ACNA dioceses.

== Theology ==
PEARUSA subscribes to the Jerusalem Declaration made at the 2008 Global Anglican Future Conference; the Nicene, Apostles', Athanasian, and Chalcedonian creeds; and the 39 Articles of Religion. It upholds the 1662 Book of Common Prayer as the standard for faith and practice, although it offers member parishes flexibility in determining liturgical arrangements. PEARUSA is characterized by the reformed theology of the English Reformation and by the spiritual fervor of the East African Revival.

== Structure ==
PEARUSA identifies its structure as conciliar and collegial; it is governed by a General College of Laity and Clergy, which delegates routine oversight to a Mission Council composed of PEARUSA's bishops and a clergy and lay delegate from each regional network. Each regional network must consist of at least 12 parishes with a combined average Sunday attendance of 1,000. A recognized regional network elects a bishop, who is then approved by PEARUSA and by ACNA's college of bishops before being submitted to the PEAR House of Bishops. In 2012, Steve Breedlove of Durham, North Carolina, was elected as the bishop for the northeast regional network and as the first presider of the PEARUSA College of Bishops. PEARUSA's structure is designed to facilitate church planting.

Unlike PEAR, PEARUSA does not ordain women to the presbyterate, but only to the diaconate.

== College of Bishops ==
Bishop	Year Consecrated	Regional Network	Notes
Thad Barnum	2001	Mid-Atlantic and Northeast	Assisting bishop for New England
Terrell Glenn	2008	Transferred to the ACNA 2013	Missionary bishop in The Diocese of the Western Gulf Coast-ACNA
Steve Breedlove	2012	Mid-Atlantic and Northeast	PEARUSA Presider
Ken Ross	2013	West	
Quigg Lawrence	2013	Mid-Atlantic and Northeast	Bishop Suffragan for Virginia and North Carolina
David Bryan	2013	Southeast	
