= Steve Breedlove =

American bishop of the Anglican Church in North America

The Right Reverend Steve Breedlove
- Bishop of the Anglican Diocese of Christ Our Hope
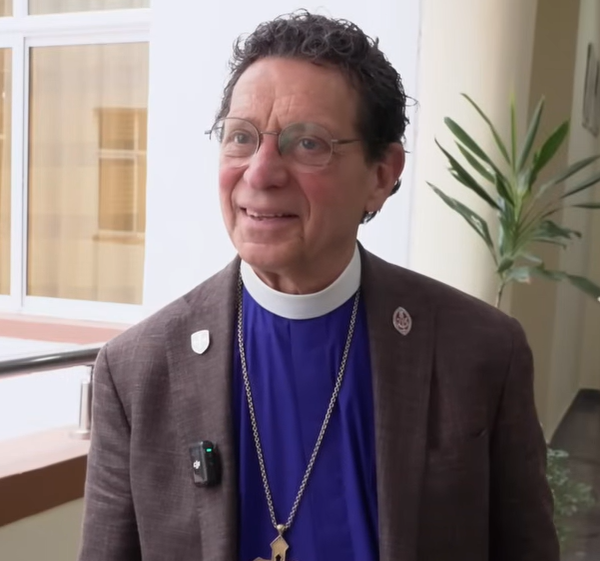
- Breedlove interviewed by AnglicanTV in 2026
- Church: Anglican Church in North America
- Diocese: PEARUSA; Christ Our Hope
- In office: 2012–2024
- Predecessor: See created
- Successor: Alan J. Hawkins
- Other posts: Presider, PEARUSA

Orders
- Ordination: 2005
- Consecration: 29 October 2012 by Robert Duncan

Personal details
- Born: Tyler, Texas, United States
- Spouse: Sally Breedlove
- Children: 5
- Education: Robert E. Lee High School
- Alma mater: Washington and Lee University; Dallas Theological Seminary

Steven Allen Breedlove (born 1950) is an American Anglican bishop. He was the first presider of PEARUSA, a missionary district that jointly part of the Anglican Church in North America and the Anglican Church of Rwanda, from 2012 to 2016, after which he was the first diocesan bishop of the newly formed Anglican Diocese of Christ Our Hope in the ACNA.

== Early life, education and early ministry ==
Breedlove was born in Tyler, Texas to First Lieutenant James Robby Breedlove and Paula Kent. He graduated from Robert E. Lee High School and attended Washington and Lee University for undergraduate studies. He then obtained Master of Theology and Doctor of Ministry degrees from Dallas Theological Seminary, writing a dissertation based on case studies in team ministry at Bethany Chapel in Calgary, Alberta, where he was the senior pastor from 1990 to 1997. He was a non-denominational Christian pastor for 29 years prior to converting to Anglicanism in 2001.

== Anglicanism ==
In 2005, Breedlove was ordained as a priest of the Anglican Church of Rwanda through the Anglican Mission in the Americas (AMIA) and served as a pastor at the Church of the Apostles. Later that year, he planted All Saints Church in Chapel Hill, North Carolina, serving as the church's rector. He was also the founder and director of the Anglican Missional Pastor leadership program developed for men and women entering ordained ministry.

After the withdrawal of the AMIA from the newly formed Anglican Church in North America, Breedlove was unanimously elected the first presider bishop pro tem of PEARUSA (an acronym formed from the French acronym for the Anglican Church of Rwanda), the Rwandan church's new missionary district in the United States and a dual church body of the Anglican Church of Rwanda and the ACNA. He was installed on 11 June 2012. Bishop Breedlove's consecration took place on 29 October 2012, in Denver by Archbishops Robert Duncan and Onesphore Rwaje.

Breedlove became the first diocesan bishop of the newly constituted Anglican Diocese of Christ Our Hope on 21 June 2016 upon the dissolution of PEARUSA as a result of its transfer from the Rwandan church solely into the ACNA.

On Thursday June 17, 2021, the College of Bishops of the Anglican Church in North America confirmed the election of Alan Hawkins as bishop coadjutor of the Anglican Diocese of Christ Our Hope. Hawkins served alongside Breedlove until Breedlove transitioned out of his role as bishop ordinary in 2024.

On April 5, 2022, people from the Diocese of Christ Our Hope alleged publicly that Breedlove failed to appropriately handle allegations of spiritual abuse by a pastor at Church of the Resurrection. The allegedly mishandled investigation resulted in a second investigation into Breedlove's handling of the matter conducted by Grand River Solutions. After a second investigation into the abuse claims, no action was taken against the pastor and the diocese said he had its bishops' confidence. Breedlove publicly apologized for a "long, painful, and misguided" investigative process.

Following his retirement, Breedlove was appointed by Archbishop Steve Wood to chair a bishops' commission within the ACNA that would focus on developing fellowship among ACNA bishops, supporting cross-diocesan ministry initiatives, managing bishop elections, mediating conflicts among bishops and dioceses and training bishops.

== Personal life ==
Breedlove has been married to Sally Breedlove, a writer, since 1972, and they have five children and fourteen grandchildren. In 2009, Breedlove co-wrote the book The Shame Exchange - Trading Shame for God's Mercy and Freedom with his wife and Ralph and Jennifer Ennis.

Religious titles
| New title | Presider Bishop, PEARUSA; 2012–2016 | Position abolished |
| New title | I Bishop of Christ Our Hope; 2016–2024 | Succeeded by Alan J. Hawkins |
