= Portrait of Margarete Brömsen =

1642 painting by Michael Conrad Hirt

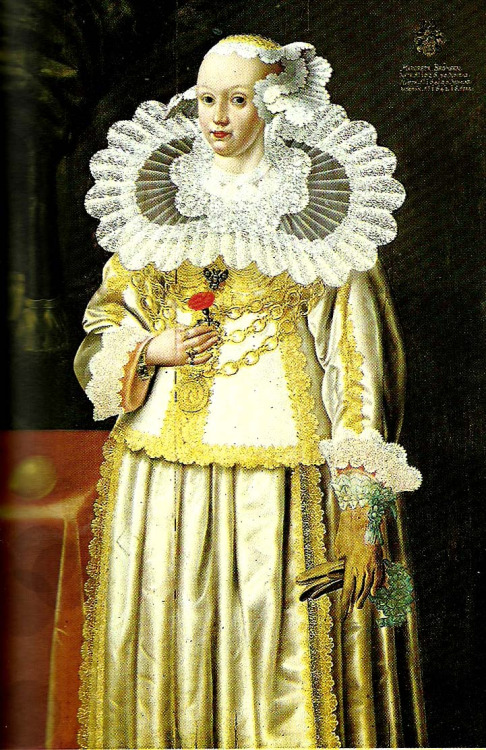
- Artist: Michael Conrad Hirt
- Year: 1642
- Medium: Oil paint, panel
- Dimensions: 124.5 cm (49.0 in) × 91.5 cm (36.0 in)
- Location: St. Anne's Museum Quarter
- Identifiers: RKDimages ID: 279931; Bildindex der Kunst und Architektur ID: 00044443

Portrait of Margarete Brömsen is a painting by the German Baroque painter Michael Conrad Hirt, painted in 1642 and now in St. Anne's Museum. It is considered a wedding portrait, but a pendant of her husband, Diedrich von Brömsen, is unknown.

== Painting ==
This painting is inscribed with MARGRETA.BRÖMSEN NATA . A:1626.30 NOVEMB NUPTA. A:1641.29.NOVEMB: MORTUA. A:1642.16.APRIL, which reports Margarete Brömsen's birth date (30 November 1626), the marriage date (29 November 1641), and the death date (16 April 1642). She is wearing a lace cap and a wide lace collar over a white dress edged with gold trim with a gold chain. In her right hand she holds a carnation and in her gloved left hand she holds another glove. Margarete Brömsen was the wealthy daughter of the Lübeck mayor Anton Kohler. The visible amount of gold in her dress shows an ostentatious display that may be the result of the 9 October 1641 confirmation of nobility rights for the families of Warendorp, Wickede, Brömsen, Luneburg, Kerkring, and Stiten by Emperor Ferdinand III. The privileges are referred to as the Zirkelgesellschaft (Circle company).

Since the dates on the painting report that she died only 5 months after her wedding, Margarete Brömsen was possibly painted during pregnancy and could have died in childbirth. Considering the fact that a pendant is unknown and marriage pendants were often made in the year after the wedding, then this painting could be a commemorative posthumous portrait. Deathbed portraits were common for rich families at the time, and for children in the Netherlands, sometimes the deceased was posed to look alive. Other portraits Hirt made of her contemporaries were:

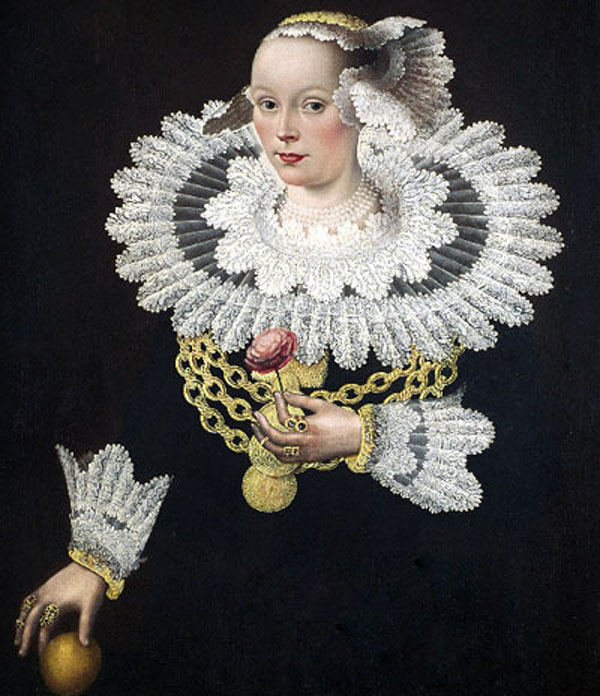
1642 portrait of Anna Rosina Marquart

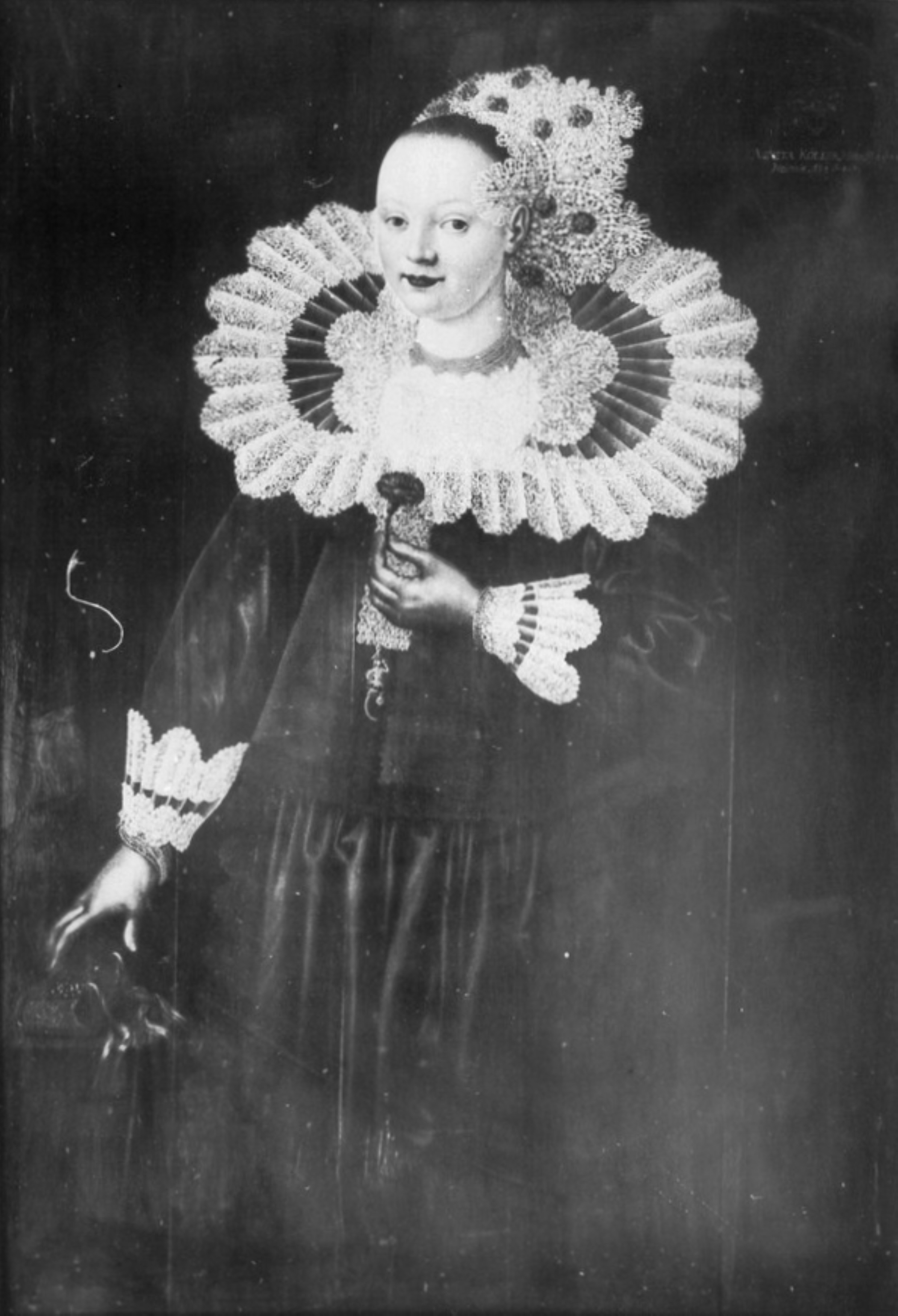
1640 portrait of Agneta Köhler (* 1625; † 1640)

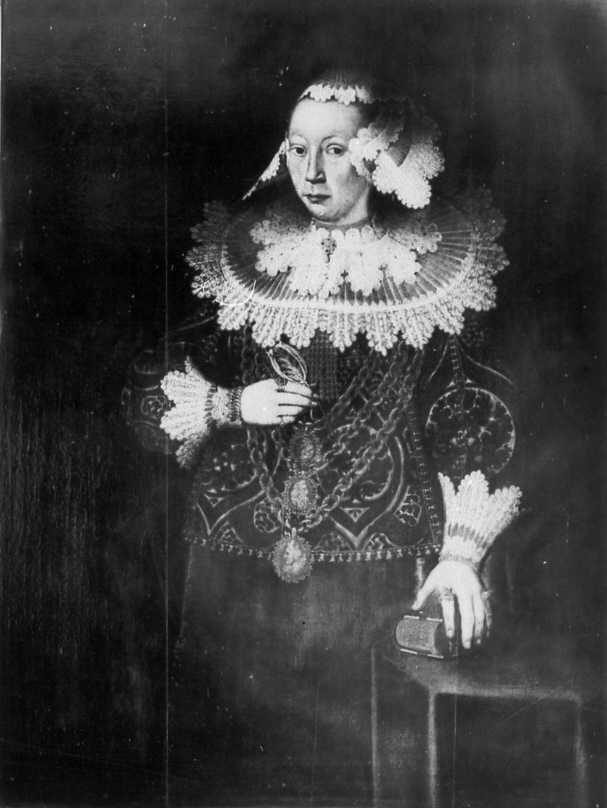
Portrait of Magdalena Köhler née Brömbse (1626-1642)

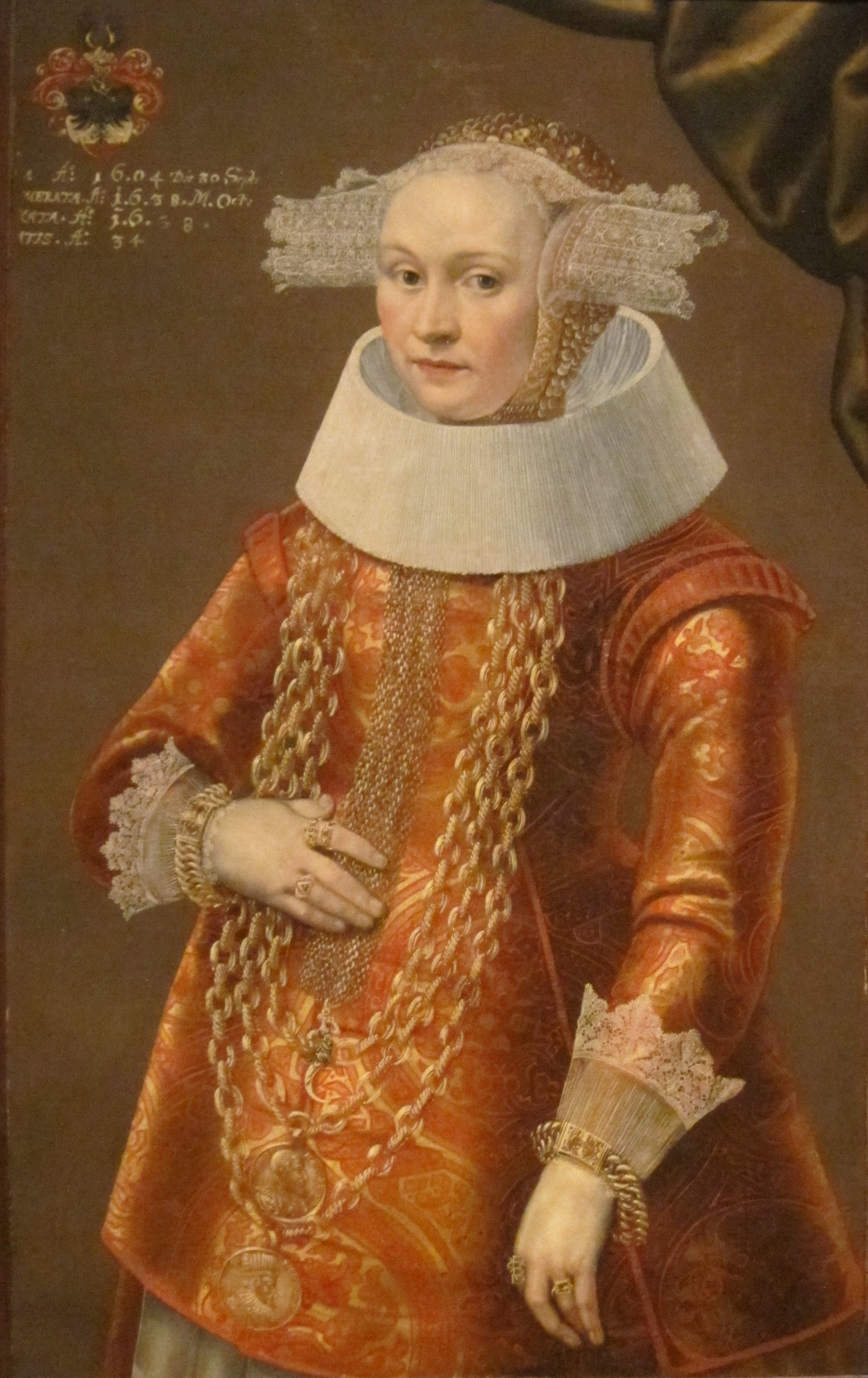
Portrait of a Daughter of Dieterich Bromsen

== Legacy ==
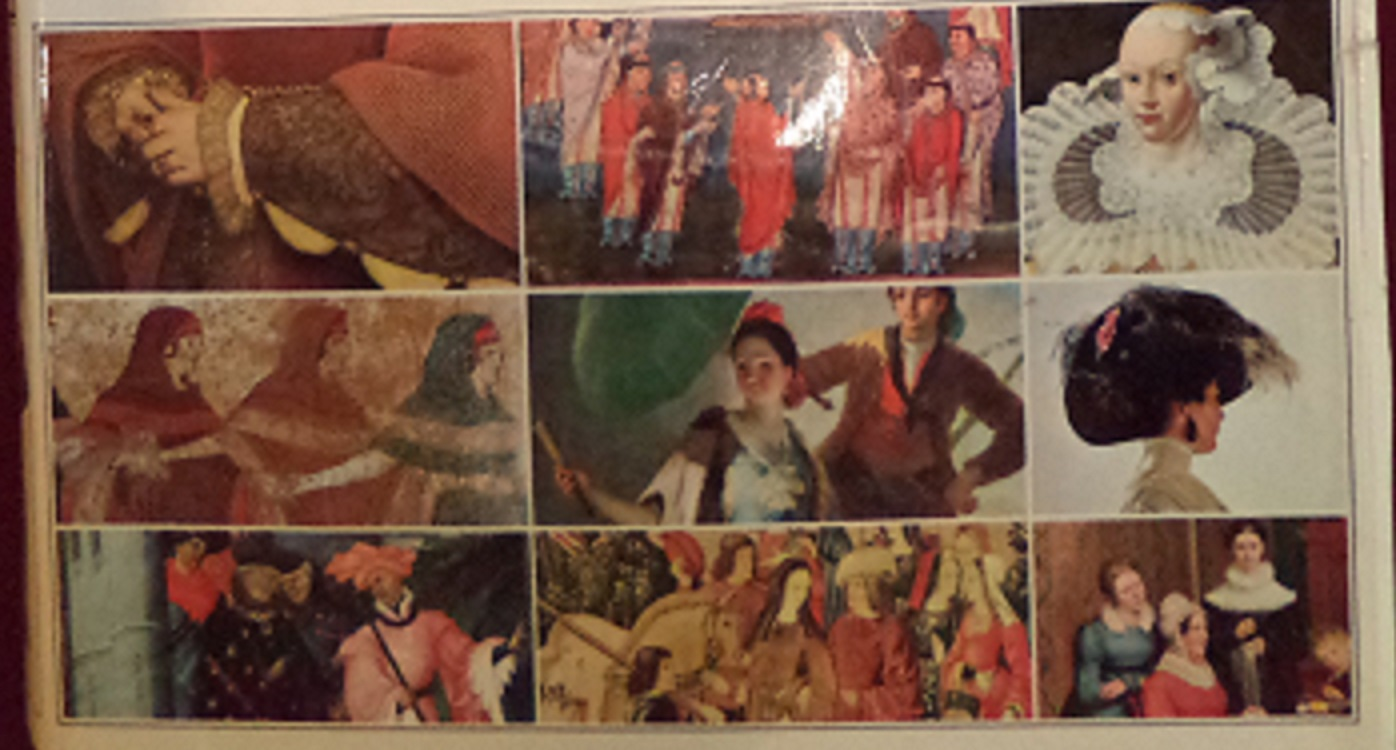
Cover of 20,000 Years of Fashion with details of illustrations

This portrait was selected by Yvonne Deslandres for her book 20,000 Years of Fashion to illustrate the backward fashion of German provincial weddings, and the unusual cap was featured on the cover.

In the 1990s this painting enjoyed some notoriety as the headdress was considered to be the model for the headdress of the wedding costume design by Eiko Ishioka for the role of Lucy Westenra portrayed by Sadie Frost in Bram Stoker's Dracula.
