= Schiaparelli (fashion house) =

French fashion house

Elsa Schiaparelli SAS

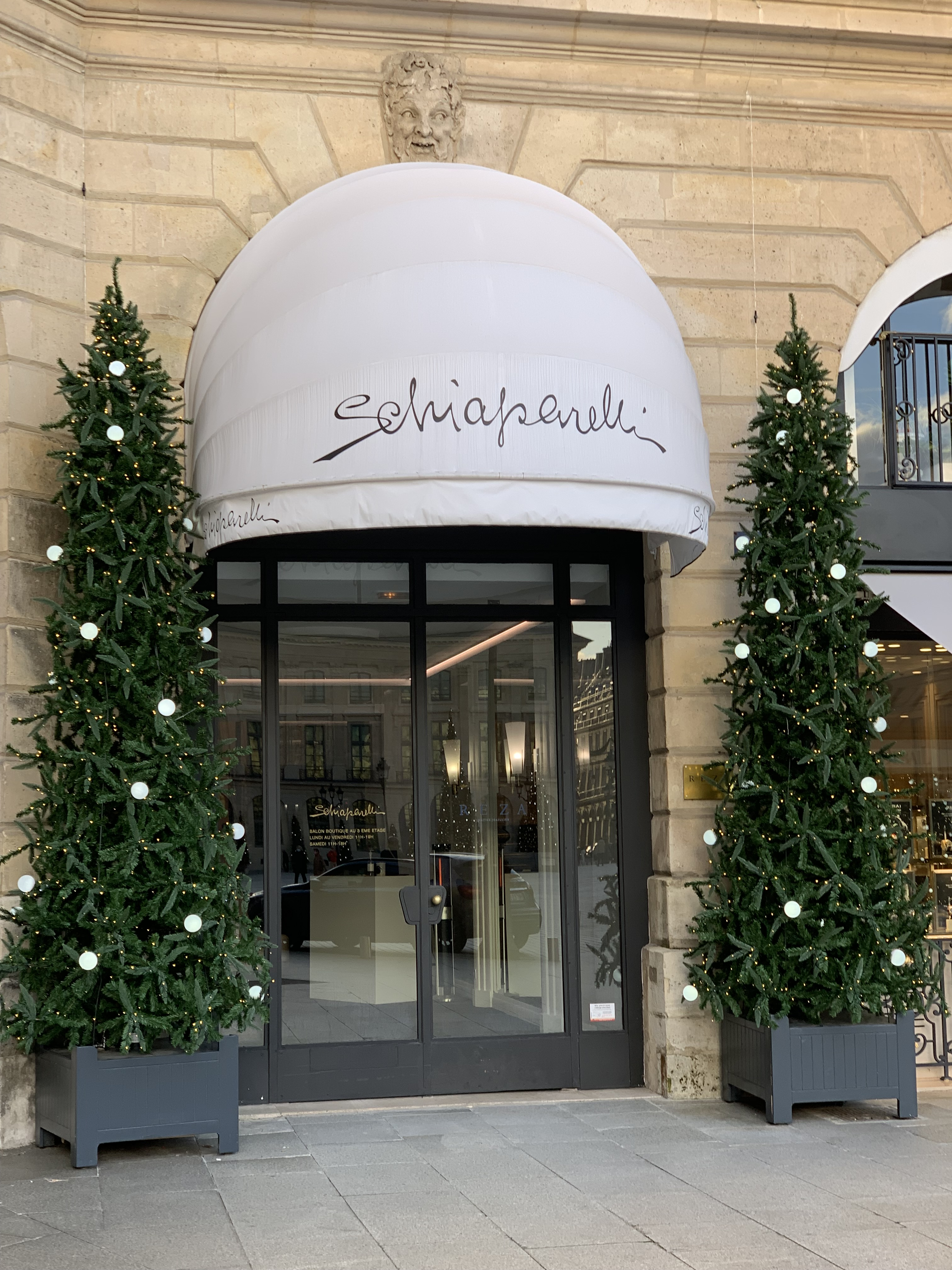
- Schiaparelli boutique on Place Vendôme
- Trade name: Schiaparelli
- Industry: Fashion
- Founded: 1957 (69 years ago) in Paris
- Founder: Elsa Schiaparelli
- Headquarters: 21, Place Vendôme; 75001 Paris; France; 48.8682523°N 2.3294554°E
- Number of locations: 10 stores worldwide (2026)
- Key people: Delphine Bellini (CEO); Daniel Roseberry (artistic director)
- Website: schiaparelli.com

Elsa Schiaparelli SAS, (/ˌskæpəˈrɛli, ˌʃæp-/ SKAP-ə-REL-ee, SHAP-, US also /skiˌɑːp-/ skee-AHP-, Italian: [skjapaˈrɛlli]), also known as Schiaparelli, is a luxury fashion house owned by the Italian company Tod's Group.

In 1957 in Paris, the Italian fashion designer Elsa Schiaparelli founded a perfume company. In 2014 a fashion house was established within this legal entity under creative director Marco Zanini. Nowadays the company specialises in haute couture, ready-to-wear, and accessories. Delphine Bellini has been CEO of Schiaparelli since 2014, and Daniel Roseberry creative director since 2019.

Fashion house Schiaparelli markets a legacy based on its founder. She was also the founder of the luxury fashion house Maison Schiaparelli in 1927 which went bankrupt in 1954. Maison Schiaparelli's style is often described as surrealist. During the existence of Maison Schiaparelli, Elsa Schiaparelli collaborated with leading artists of the surrealist movement such as Salvador Dalí and Leonor Fini.

== Legacy of Elsa Schiaparelli (1927–1954) ==
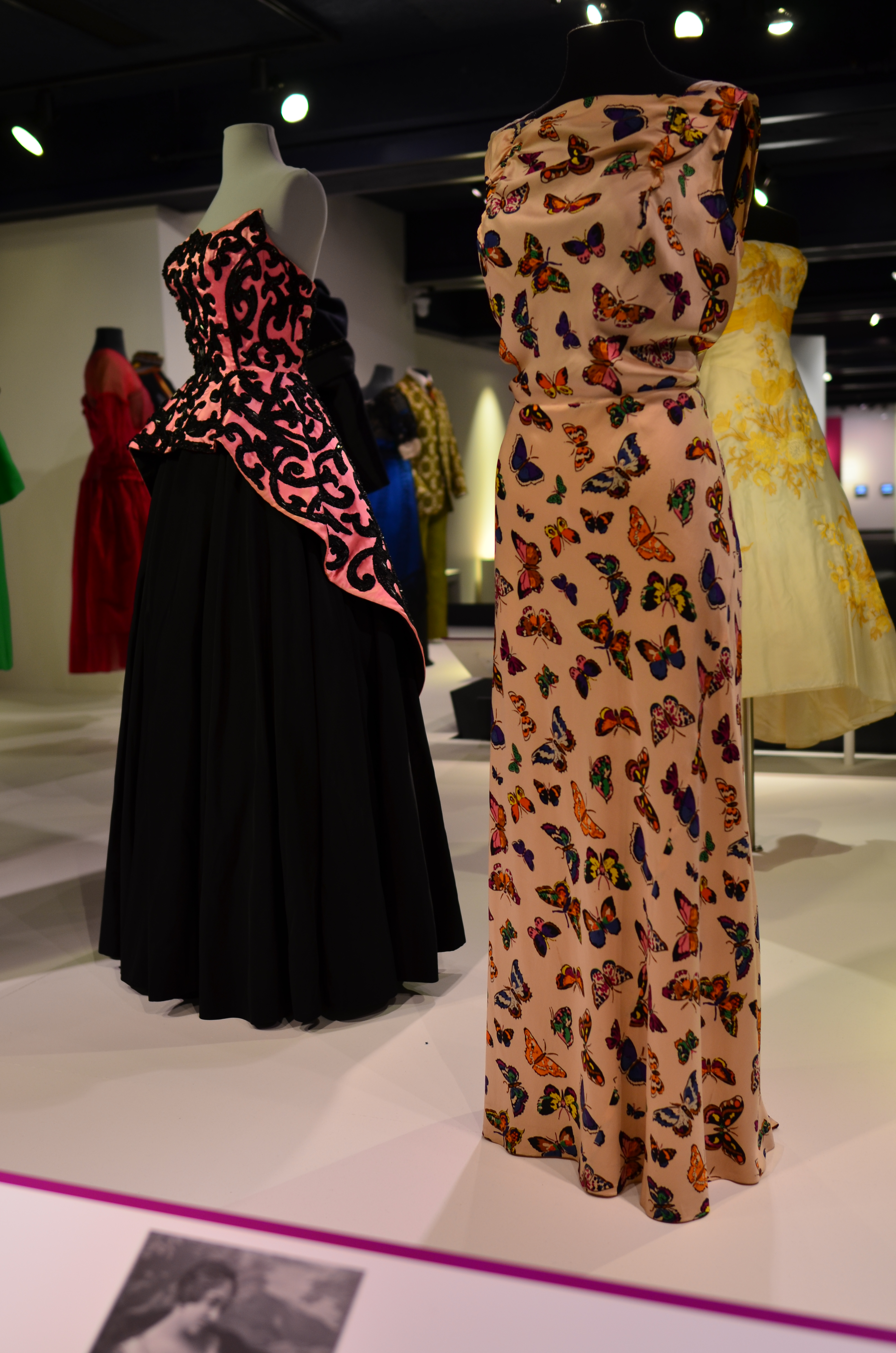
Two Schiaparelli evening gowns. The left gown, from 1951, features Schiaparelli's signature colour, shocking pink. The right gown, featuring a whimsical butterfly print, is from 1937.

Elsa Schiaparelli opened an atelier in Paris in 1927. Her early designs were relatively conservative, with a focus on knitwear. Her business grew over time, employing 400 employees by 1932. Already a long-time collaborator with Man Ray, Schiaparelli began further collaborations with artists from the Surrealist movement in the mid-1930s, including Salvador Dalí, Jean Cocteau, and Leonor Fini. During this period, she came into what would become her signature quirky, surrealistic aesthetic. After the Second World War, Schiaparelli's star dimmed, overtaken by new couture designers such as Christian Dior. In 1954, the house declared bankruptcy. Elsa Schiaparelli created a new company (Elsa Schiaparelli SAS) in 1957 to sell her perfumes, which is the actual company today. She also went on promoting the perfumes and giving lectures.

== Transition to fashion house (2013–present) ==
In 2007, Diego Della Valle, chairman of Tod's Group, purchased Elsa Schiaparelli SAS and associated Schiaparelli trademarks. Della Valle hired Christian Lacroix to create a singular couture collection for the house, it debuted at the Musée des Arts Decoratifs on 1 July 2013. Marco Zanini, was then hired as creative director and his first collection debuted in 2014. Zanini stepped down in November 2014, only creating two collections for the house.

In April 2015, Bertrand Guyon was appointed as the new creative director of Schiaparelli, his first collection was shown in July of the same year. Schiaparelli was re-admitted into the Chambre Syndicale de la Haute Couture in 2017, Schiaparelli was permitted to use the term "haute couture". Schiaparelli had been a "guest member" of the Chambre syndicale since 2013. In 2018, the house debuted its first ready-to-wear collection, in lookbook form. Schiaparelli ready-to-wear collections began showing on the runway from the Autumn/Winter collection in March 2023.

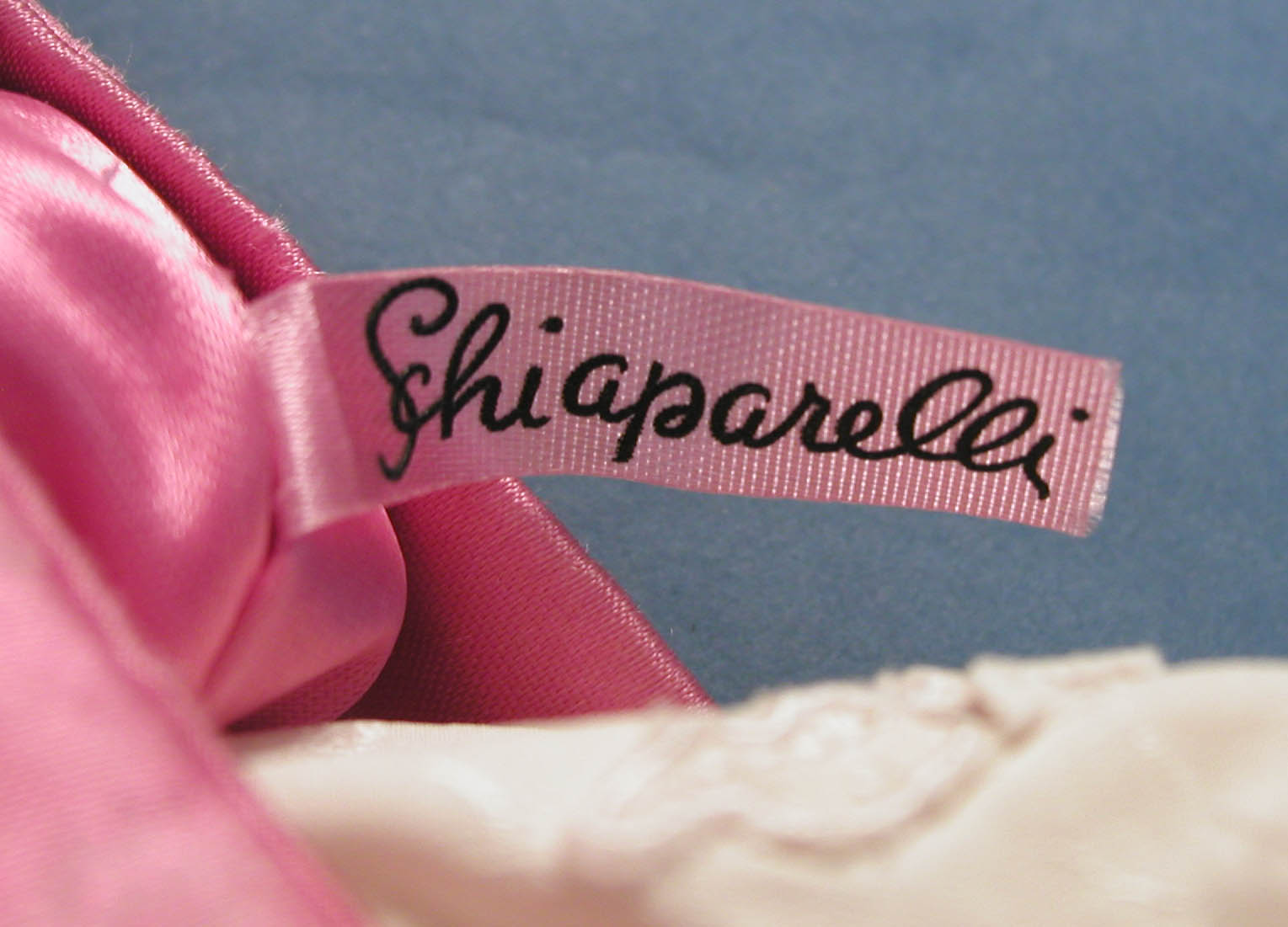
A tag from a vintage Schiaparelli design, using Elsa Schiaparelli's signature "shocking pink"

It was announced in April 2019 that Guyon would be succeeded by Texas-born designer Daniel Roseberry, Roseberry would become the first American to head a French couture house. Guyon's collections were noted for frequent allusions to classic Schiaparelli designs (such as the lobster dress), Roseberry stated that he intended to avoid such literal references, drawing instead on the "spirit" of Elsa Schiaparelli. Under Daniel Roseberry, Schiaparelli has produced a number of high-profile celebrity garments. In December 2020, Kim Kardashian posted images to Instagram of herself wearing a green bodice with prominently sculpted abdominal muscles and large, bauble-like black and gold earrings, all designed by Schiaparelli. The outfit was widely discussed online, with Internet commentators playfully comparing Kardashian's appearance to the Hulk and the Teenage Mutant Ninja Turtles. Similar designs with exaggerated sculpted muscles soon appeared in the house's Spring 2021 haute couture collection, which was shown in January 2021.

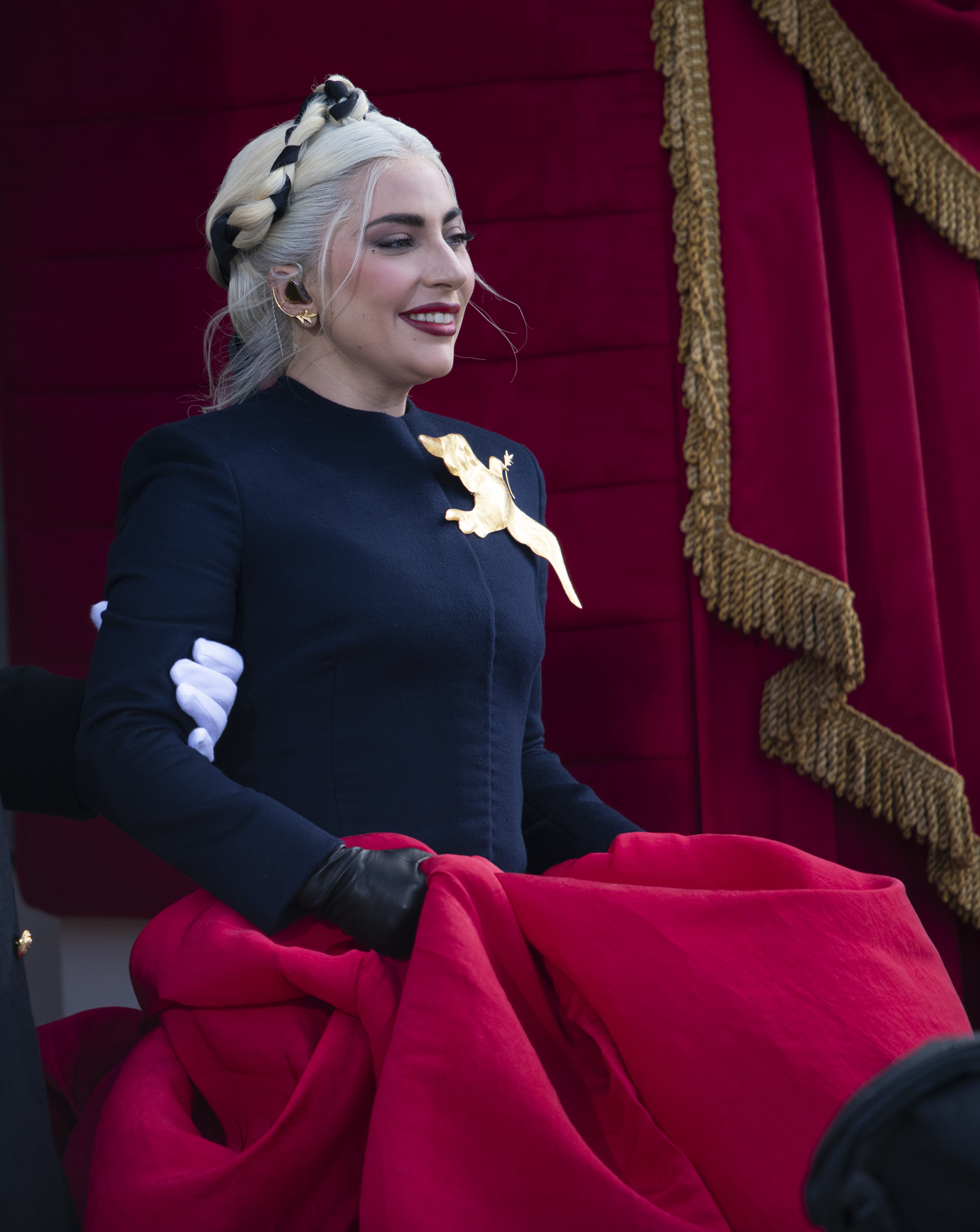
Lady Gaga wearing a Schiaparelli ball gown decorated with a large dove brooch to the 2021 inauguration of Joe Biden, where she sang the national anthem.

In January, singer Lady Gaga wore a Schiaparelli ball gown decorated with a golden dove of peace to the inauguration of Joe Biden, where she performed the national anthem. The New York Times and Harper's Bazaar praised Schiaparelli as a breakout star of the 63rd Annual Grammy Awards, for which they dressed Beyoncé and Noah Cyrus.

For the Spring/Summer 2023 Haute Couture collection, the brand produced a series of gowns featuring shockingly lifelike 3D embroidery of animal heads of a wolf, a leopard, and a lion. The lion head gown was notably worn by Kylie Jenner. Whilst Shalom Harlow, Irina Shayk, and Naomi Campbell walked the runway donning the animal head gowns. According to Roseberry, the choice of animals was an allusion to Dante's Inferno. The realism of the garments sparked fierce debate online among animal rights activists, however the pieces were constructed out of resin, foam, silk, and other non-fur materials.

From 28 March to 8 November 2026, the Victoria & Albert Museum will exhibit Schiaparelli: Fashion Becomes Art tracing the history of Elsa Schiaparelli.

== Boutiques ==
As of 2026, Schiaparelli operates ten boutiques around the globe. Independent boutiques are operated in Paris (Place Vendôme), Dubai (Mandarin Oriental Jumeira and Dubai Mall), Hong Kong (Prince's Building), and Monte Carlo (Hôtel de Paris). Store-within-a-store boutiques are found in Bergdorf Goodman (New York City), Hankyu (Osaka), Harrods (London), and Neiman Marcus (Dallas - NorthPark Center and Los Angeles - Beverly Hills).

== Governance ==
=== CEOs ===
- Delphine Bellini (2014–present)

=== Creative directors ===
A list of creative directors of Schiaparelli: (Note: The role of 'creative director' has previously briefly been referred to as 'director of style' in the 2010s and is sometimes referred to as 'designer' or 'artistic director'.)

- Christian Lacroix (2013)
- Marco Zanini (2013–2014)
- Bertrand Guyon (2015–2019)
- Daniel Roseberry (2019–present)

== See also ==
- Elsa Schiaparelli
