= Daniel Roseberry =

American fashion designer

Daniel Roseberry (Born on September 5, 1985) is an American fashion designer. He is the creative director of the French-owned haute couture house Schiaparelli.

== Early life ==
Roseberry was born in Plano, Texas in 1985. (Note: Roseberry was 33 years old in 2019.) He was raised in a religious household, with his father, David Roseberry, being an Anglican minister, and attended Trinity Christian Academy in Addison, Texas. At 19, he went on a mission in the Middle East. He subsequently moved to New York City to study at the Fashion Institute of Technology.

In 2008, Roseberry dropped out of FIT to work for the fashion brand Thom Browne. He worked there for more than ten years, eventually becoming the brand's design director.

== Schiaparelli ==
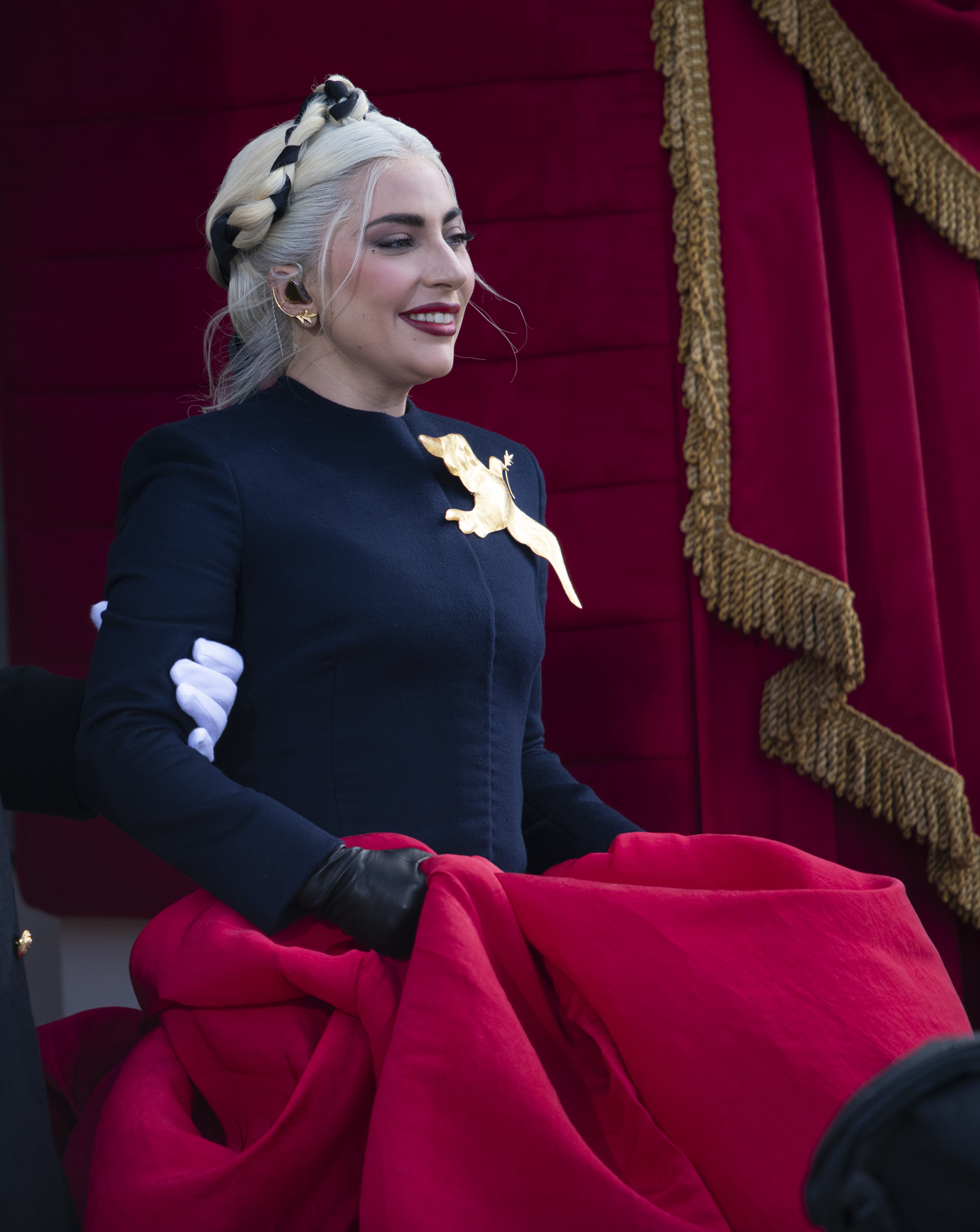
Roseberry designed the outfit worn by Lady Gaga to the inauguration of Joe Biden. Roseberry initially envisioned the ensemble being all-white, but switched to a red and blue colour scheme at the suggestion of Gaga.

Schiaparelli is a Parisian couture house founded in 1927 by Elsa Schiaparelli, a designer known for her bold, surrealist styles. The house went bankrupt in 1954, but was revived in the 21st century, presenting its first new runway collection in 2014. Roseberry was named as the house's new creative director in April 2019, taking over from Betrand Guyon. He was the first American to lead a French couture house, and among the youngest to do so. At the time, Roseberry had no formal training in haute couture, and spoke no French.

Roseberry showed his first collection for Schiaparelli in July 2019, just two months after joining. During the presentation, he sat at a drafting table in the centre of the runway, recreating the process by which he had designed the collection while living in his New York apartment. Roseberry stated that, in a departure from the houses's recent work, he deliberately avoided referencing or imitating the work of Elsa Schiaparelli, aiming instead to merely "capture the spirit and the bravery of Schiaparelli."

As head of Schiaparelli, Roseberry has designed a number of high-profile garments for celebrities, including Beyoncé, Michelle Obama, and Kim Kardashian. He designed, with the singer's input, the bulletproof outfit worn by Lady Gaga when she sang the national anthem at the inauguration of Joe Biden: a red, voluminous ballgown under a fitted navy blue jacket with a large golden dove of peace brooch.

== Awards ==
In 2024, Roseberry received the Neiman Marcus Award for Creative Impact in the Field of Fashion.
