= Michael Conrad Hirt =

17th-century German painter

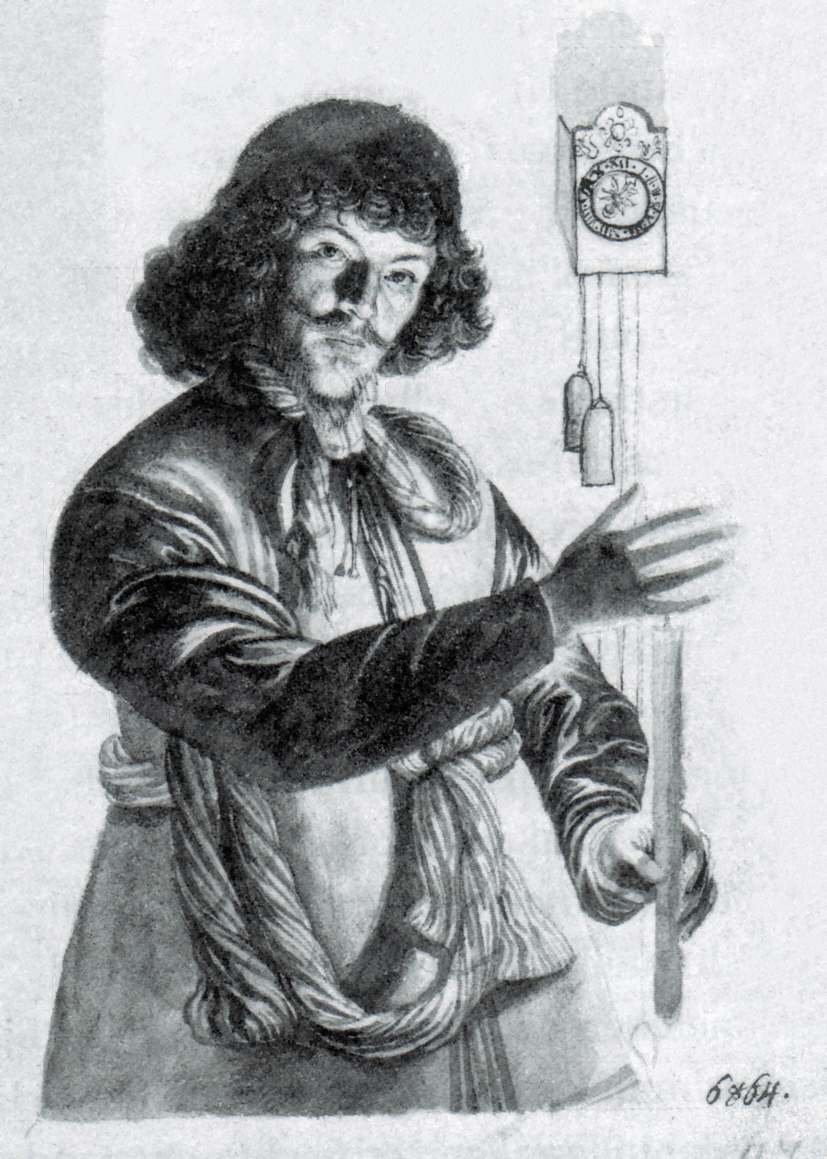
- Born: 1613; Bayreuth
- Died: 1671 (aged 57–58); Bayreuth

Michael Conrad Hirt (1613–1671) was a German Baroque artist.

Hirt became a court painter in Berlin, where he made portraits and paintings of historical subjects. He is also well known for his work for St. Nicolas Church, Stendal. Hirt was born and died in Bayreuth.

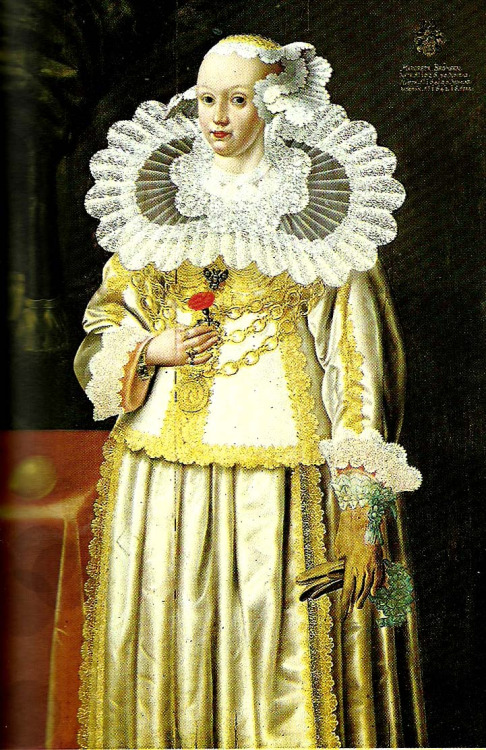
Portrait of Margarete Brömsen, 1642

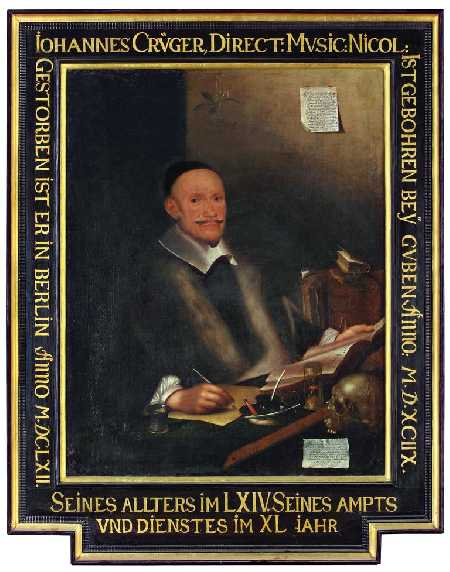
Portrait of Johann Crüger, 1663

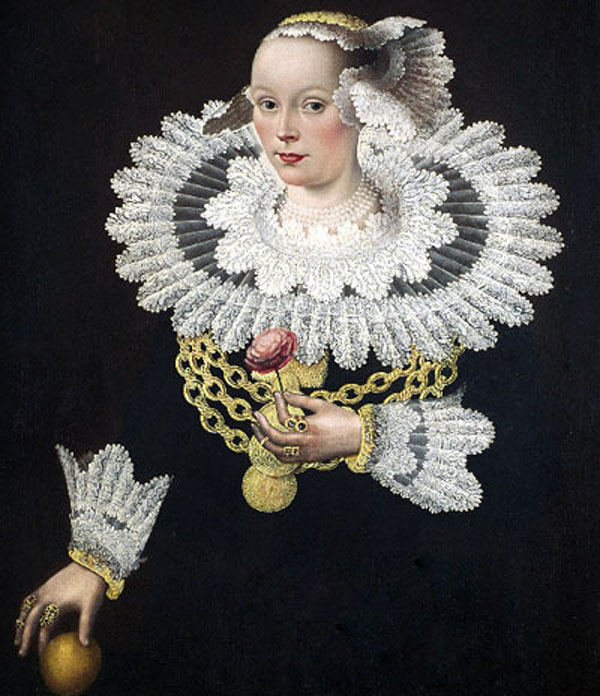
Portrait of Anna Rosina Marquart, née Tanck, wife of Johann Marquard, mayor of Lübeck, 1642
