= Yvonne Deslandres =

- Born: 8 February 1923; France
- Died: 12 December 1986 (aged 63)

Yvonne Deslandres (February 8, 1923 – December 12, 1986) was a French writer, curator, archivist, and art historian. She specialized in costume and adornment.

She studied at École Nationale des Chartes. She worked for François Boucher as his assistant at the Carnavalet Museum, and later for his Union Française des Arts du Costume (UFAC), which she took over after his death in 1966. She became curator for the Musée de la mode et du textile from 1983 after the UFAC merged with it.

== Works ==
- 20,000 Years of Fashion: The History of Costume and Personal Adornment, together with Francois Boucher, 1963-1966, and updated in 1987
- Le Costume, image de l'homme, 1976
- l'Histoire de la Mode au XXe Siecle, 1986
- Poiret: Paul Poiret 1879-1944, 1987
