= Marco Zanini =

Italian fashion designer (born 1971)

- Born: 1971 (age 54–55); Milan, Italy
- Education: Nuova Accademia di Belle Arti
- Occupation: Fashion designer
- Label: Schiaparelli

Marco Zanini (born 1971) is an Italian fashion designer. He is most noted for serving as creative director of Schiaparelli in 2014, overseeing the couture fashion house's first runway show since the closure of Maison Schiaparelli 1954. This came after having led the successful revival at Halston and Rochas.

== Career ==
After graduating from Nuova Accademia di Belle Arti in 2005, Zanini went on to work as Lawrence Steele's first assistant.
