= Francois Boucher (art historian) =

French museum curator and writer (1885–1966)

François Boucher
- Born: 26 November 1885; Paris, France
- Died: 23 November 1966 (aged 80); Neuilly-sur-Seine, France

François Leon Louis Boucher (26 November 1885 – 23 November 1966) was a French museum curator and writer.

== Biography ==
Boucher was born in Paris on 26 November 1885. He became curator at the Musée Carnavalet, Paris. He founded the Union française des arts du costume (UFAC) that later merged with the costume museum Musée de la mode et du textile of the Louvre under the guidance of his assistant Yvonne Deslandres. Boucher died in Neuilly-sur-Seine on 23 November 1966, at the age of 80.

== Works ==
- Tableau de la France par les écrivains illustres, 1948
- Histoire du Costume en Occident de l’antiquité à nos jours, 1963-5
- 20,000 Years of Fashion: The History of Costume and Personal Adornment, (with Yvonne Deslandres), 1966
