= David Roseberry =

American Anglican priest (born 1955)

The Reverend Canon David Roseberry
- Rector Emeritus of Christ Church Plano
- Church: Episcopal Church (before 2006); Anglican Church of Rwanda (2007–2009); Anglican Church in North America (since 2009)
- Successor: Paul Donison

Orders
- Ordination: 1983 (priesthood)

Personal details
- Born: May 27, 1955 (age 71)
- Denomination: Anglican
- Residence: Plano, Texas
- Spouse: Fran
- Children: 4, including Daniel Roseberry
- Occupation: Priest
- Education: University of Arizona; Church Divinity School of the Pacific

David Hill Roseberry (born May 27, 1955) is an American Anglican priest and author. As rector of Christ Church in Plano, Texas—one of the largest churches in the Episcopal Church before it disaffiliated in 2006—he was a key figure in the Anglican realignment in the United States and in the founding and growth of the Anglican Church in North America.

== Early life, education and ordained ministry ==
Roseberry was born in 1955 and raised in southern Arizona in the Episcopal Church. He studied marine biology and oceanography at the University of Arizona and received his M.Div. at the Church Divinity School of the Pacific and was ordained to the priesthood in 1983.

After ordination, he worked as a priest in Tucson, Arizona. During this time, he was summoned to the bedside of his father-in-law, who was near death and who asked Roseberry for assurance of salvation. Despite his seminary education, Roseberry felt unable to answer the question, "doing this sort of reflective thing—--you know, 'Tell me more about what you're feeling.' Finally, he just waved his hand at me and said, 'Oh, never mind. Just sit there.' And I sat there and held his hands, and I knew that I had nothing that I could give him. It was about the lowest spot I had ever been." Shortly after, Roseberry shared this experience with Bishop Alden Hathaway, visiting from Pittsburgh, who encouraged Roseberry to root his ministry in the Bible. "Up until that point, I had seen the Scriptures as this inspiring set of stories, but I had never seen it as inspired," Roseberry later said. "I was preaching a kind of open-ended, God-loves-you, easy gospel, and I realized that people weren't changing." With Hathaway's encouragement, he took "a giant leap of faith and trust[ed] the Scriptures." Roseberry refashioned his ministry with evangelical theology.

== Christ Church Plano ==
In 1984, Roseberry accepted a post as an assistant pastor in Richardson, Texas. In 1985, the bishop of Dallas called him to plant a new church in the fast-growing suburb of Plano. Christ Church began in his home in April 1985 with 11 people. By August, the church moved to Carpenter Middle School, where the congregation numbered over 200. By 1989, Christ Church has bought the first parcels of its 15 acres (6.1 hectares) campus on Legacy Drive. By 2004, it was the largest Episcopal church in the country with 2,200 in average weekly attendance.

== Anglican realignment and the ACNA ==
Roseberry was a deputy from the Diocese of Dallas to the Episcopal Church's 2003 General Convention. When the election of openly gay priest Gene Robinson as bishop of New Hampshire was granted consent by the church, Roseberry resigned as a deputy in protest. His resignation was covered by some of the broadcast news outlets present for Robinson's historic election, and Roseberry became a face of the opposition within the Episcopal Church to LGBT clergy. A month later, Roseberry organized a meeting of theologically conservative Episcopalians to seek a "course correction" for the church. In January 2004, Roseberry and Christ Church Plano hosted the meeting that resulted in the formation of the Anglican Communion Network.

In 2006, after Katharine Jefferts Schori was elected presiding bishop over the objections of conservative Episcopalians, Roseberry announced that Christ Church would separate from the Episcopal Church. In leaving, Christ Church paid $1.2 million in a payment to the diocese and assumed the congregation's $6.8 million in debt. Christ Church temporarily had episcopal oversight from Bishop of Peru William Godfrey before affiliating with the Anglican Mission in America in 2007.

After the formation of the Anglican Church in North America in 2009, Christ Church hosted the investiture of its first archbishop, Robert Duncan. During his sermon, Duncan issued a call for the ACNA to plant 1,000 new churches during his primacy. Duncan named Roseberry to lead an initiative called Anglican1K to advance this goal. During Roseberry's years leading Anglican1K, the province did not reach Duncan's goal but Roseberry has written that more than 300 churches were established. During the tenure of Archbishop Foley Beach, Roseberry was named provincial canon for mission.

== Later life ==
Roseberry retired as rector of Christ Church in 2016 after 31 years and was succeeded by Canadian priest Paul Donison. He launched a ministry called LeaderWorks to develop resources for clergy and lay leaders. In 2022, Roseberry formed the LeaderWorks Trust with a $1 million donation. The trust makes grants to ACNA churches to fund feasibility studies for capital campaigns. Through its first 14 grants amounting to $130,000, recipient churches were able to raise $10 million for their capital projects.

== Personal life ==
Roseberry has been married twice; his first marriage ended in divorce. He and his wife, Fran, have four children, including fashion designer Daniel Roseberry.

Religious titles
New title	Rector of Christ Church Plano; 1985–2016	Succeeded by Paul Donison
