= Paul Donison =

Canadian-American Anglican bishop

The Right Reverend Paul Donison
- Bishop-elect of the Diocese of the Western Gulf Coast
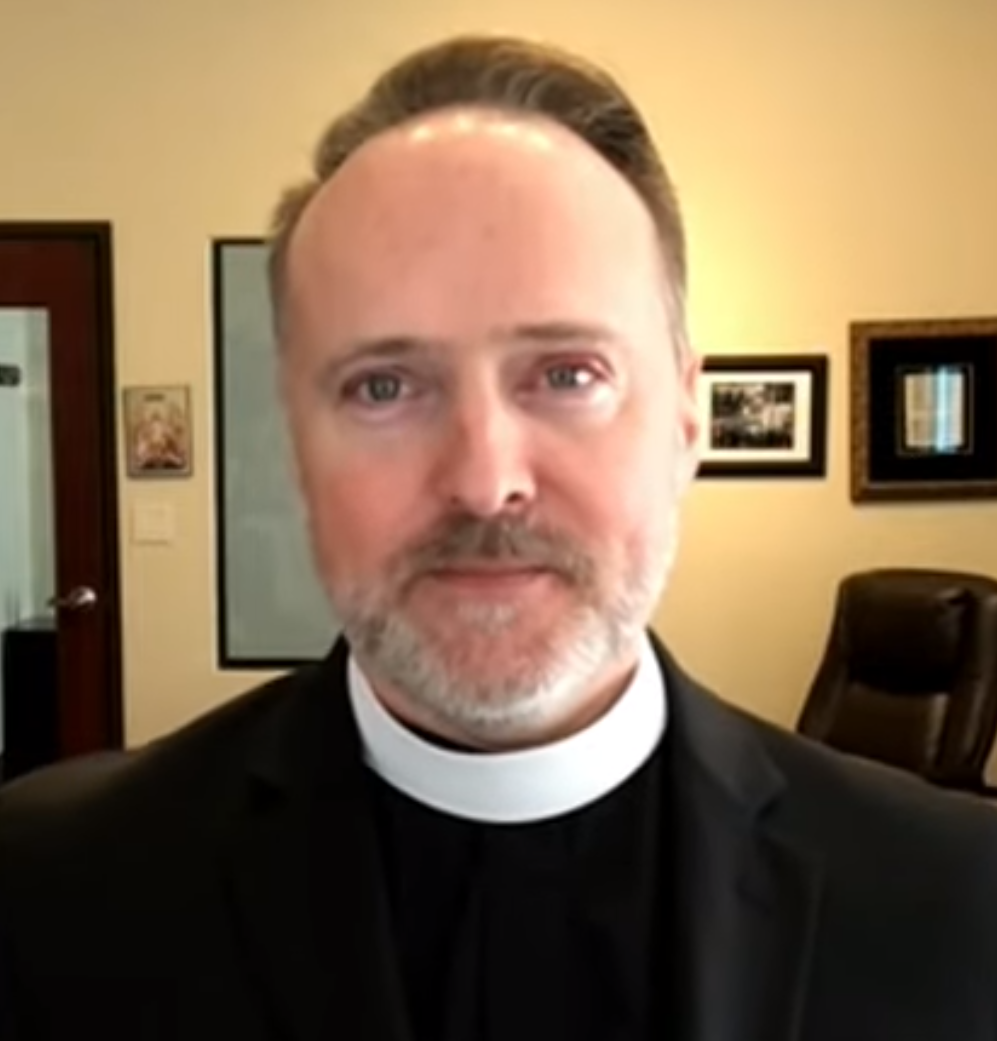
- Donison during an interview on Anglican Unscripted
- Church: Anglican Church in North America; Anglican Church of Rwanda
- Diocese: Gasabo
- Other posts: Rector, Christ Church Plano (2016–present); Gafcon General Secretary (2023–2026); Assisting bishop, Diocese of Christ Our Hope (2024–2026)

Orders
- Consecration: February 4, 2024 by Laurent Mbanda

Personal details
- Born: 1977 (age 48–49) Canada

Paul Donison (born 1977) is a Canadian-born American Anglican bishop. His primary role in ordained ministry is as rector of Christ Church Plano, one of the largest churches in and the former provincial pro-cathedral of the Anglican Church in North America. From 2023 to 2026, he was general secretary of Gafcon. In November 2026, he was elected the second diocesan bishop of the Anglican Diocese of the Western Gulf Coast.

== Early life and education ==
Donison was born in Canada and earned his B.F.A. in theatre from the University of Victoria. After university, Donison worked as a professional actor, including roles as Laertes in Hamlet and Friar Lawrence in Romeo and Juliet. He later attended Regent College, where he received an M.Div. and a diploma in Christian studies.

== Ordained ministry ==
Donison began his ordained ministry in the Anglican Church of Canada, serving in the Diocese of Fredericton and the Diocese of Ottawa. In September 2009, as part of the broader Anglican realignment, Donison stepped down as rector of the combined South Dundas parish of St. James, Morrisburg, and Holy Trinity, Riverside Heights. He voluntarily relinquished his license in the Diocese of Ottawa and joined the Anglican Network in Canada. He joined the staff of St. Peter and St. Paul's Anglican Church in Ottawa as associate priest for discipleship and became rector in 2012. Donison was shortlisted for the role of bishop of Pittsburgh in March 2016.

In 2016, Donison was elected to succeed David Roseberry as the second rector of Christ Church in Plano, Texas, which was the largest church in the ACNA and host of the investiture of Archbishop Robert Duncan in 2009. After immigrating to the United States, Donison was formally installed by Archbishop Foley Beach and Bishop Todd Hunter in January 2017.

Donison and Christ Church hosted the ACNA Provincial Assembly in 2019. In 2021, Christ Church was designated the provincial pro-cathedral for the ACNA.

== Global role ==
In 2023, Donison was elected general secretary of Gafcon, succeeding Archbishop Benjamin Kwashi. The Gafcon Primates Council determined that "the role of general secretary was episcopal in nature," so Gafcon Chairman Laurent Mbanda consecrated Donison as assistant bishop in the Diocese of Gasabo on February 4, 2024, at Holy Trinity Cathedral in Kibagabaga, Kigali. On February 17, Donison was invested as vicar general for the Texas deanery in the Anglican Diocese of the South in addition to continuing his role as rector at Christ Church. Later in 2024, Christ Church joined several churches from the Diocese of the South and the dissolving International Diocese in forming the Great Plains Missionary District, which was created with a goal of incubating a new ACNA diocese in Kansas, Nebraska, Oklahoma and northeast Texas. With this move, Donison became an assisting bishop in the Diocese of Christ Our Hope, the missionary district's canonical home.

In November 2026, Donison was elected the second diocesan bishop of the ACNA's Houston-based Diocese of the Western Gulf Coast (DWGC). As part of the election process, the congregations of the Great Plains Missionary District voted to joined the DWGC. Donison is scheduled to be seated as bishop in February 2027. With his election as diocesan bishop, Donison resigned as general secretary of Gafcon.

== Personal life ==
Donison is married to Monika; they have four children. Donison is a board member at Trinity Anglican Seminary, where he pursued doctoral studies, and East African Christian College in Kigali.

Religious titles
Preceded by David Roseberry	Rector of Christ Church Plano; 2016–present	Incumbent	
Preceded by Benjamin Kwashi	General Secretary of GAFCON; 2023–2026	Incumbent	Vacant
