= Christ Church (Plano, Texas) =

Anglican megachurch in Plano, Texas, United States

Coordinates: 33°4′14″N 96°47′2″W

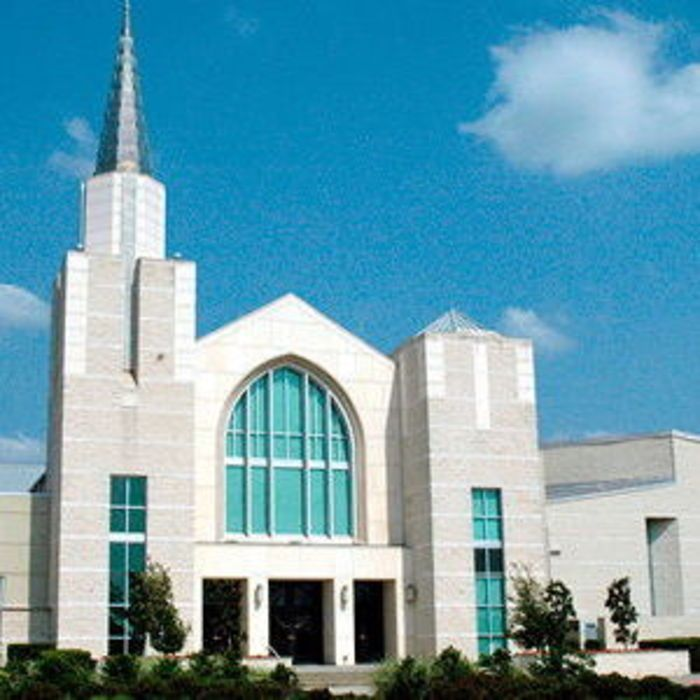
- Christ Church
- Location: Plano, Texas
- Country: United States
- Denomination: Anglican Church in North America
- Website: christchurchplano.org

History
- Founded: 1985
- Founder: The Rev. Canon David Roseberry

Administration
- Diocese: Christ Our Hope

Clergy
- Bishop: The Rt. Rev. Alan J. Hawkins
- Rector: The Rt. Rev. Paul Donison

Christ Church is an Anglican megachurch in Plano, Texas; it served as the provincial pro-cathedral for the Anglican Church in North America from 2021-2024. Planted in 1985 in the Episcopal Diocese of Dallas, Christ Church, as part of the Anglican realignment, later became a founding congregation of the Anglican Church in North America.

== History ==
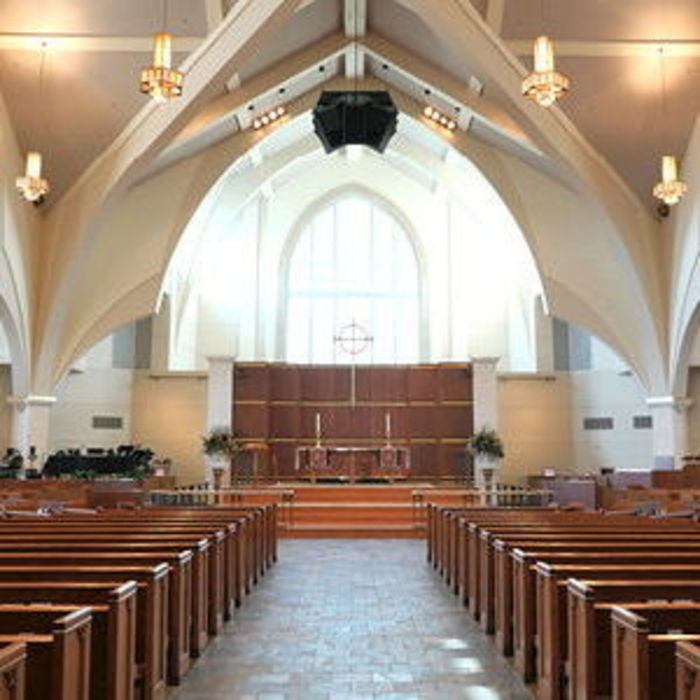
The nave of Christ Church

The Rev. Canon David Roseberry planted Christ Church in his living room in 1985 when Plano was one of Dallas' more distant suburbs. The church grew alongside the surrounding suburbs and at one point was the largest parish in the Episcopal Church. In 2006, Christ Church purchased its property and disassociated from the Dallas diocese and was temporarily overseen by Bill Godfrey, the Anglican Church of South America bishop of Peru. In 2007, Christ Church joined the Anglican Mission in America, which became a founding member of the Anglican Church in North America. Christ Church hosted the investiture of Archbishop Robert Duncan in 2009. Roseberry led the Anglican 1K church planting initiative on behalf of the province.

Following the departure of the Anglican Mission in America from full membership in the Anglican Church in North America in 2012, Christ Church joined the Diocese of Pittsburgh and later became the pro-cathedral for the Diocese of Churches for the Sake of Others. In 2016, following Roseberry's retirement, the Rev. Canon Paul Donison joined Christ Church as rector after leading Sts. Peter and Paul in Ottawa. Christ Church hosted the Anglican Church in North America's quinquennial provincial assembly in 2019. In 2021, Christ Church was designated as a province-wide pro-cathedral. This designation came to a mutual end after Steve Wood's installation as the Anglican Church in North America's archbishop in 2024, and Christ Church reverted to being a parish church.
