= 20,000 Years of Fashion =

1965 book by Francois Boucher and Yvonne Deslandres

20,000 Years of Fashion: The History of Costume and Personal Adornment
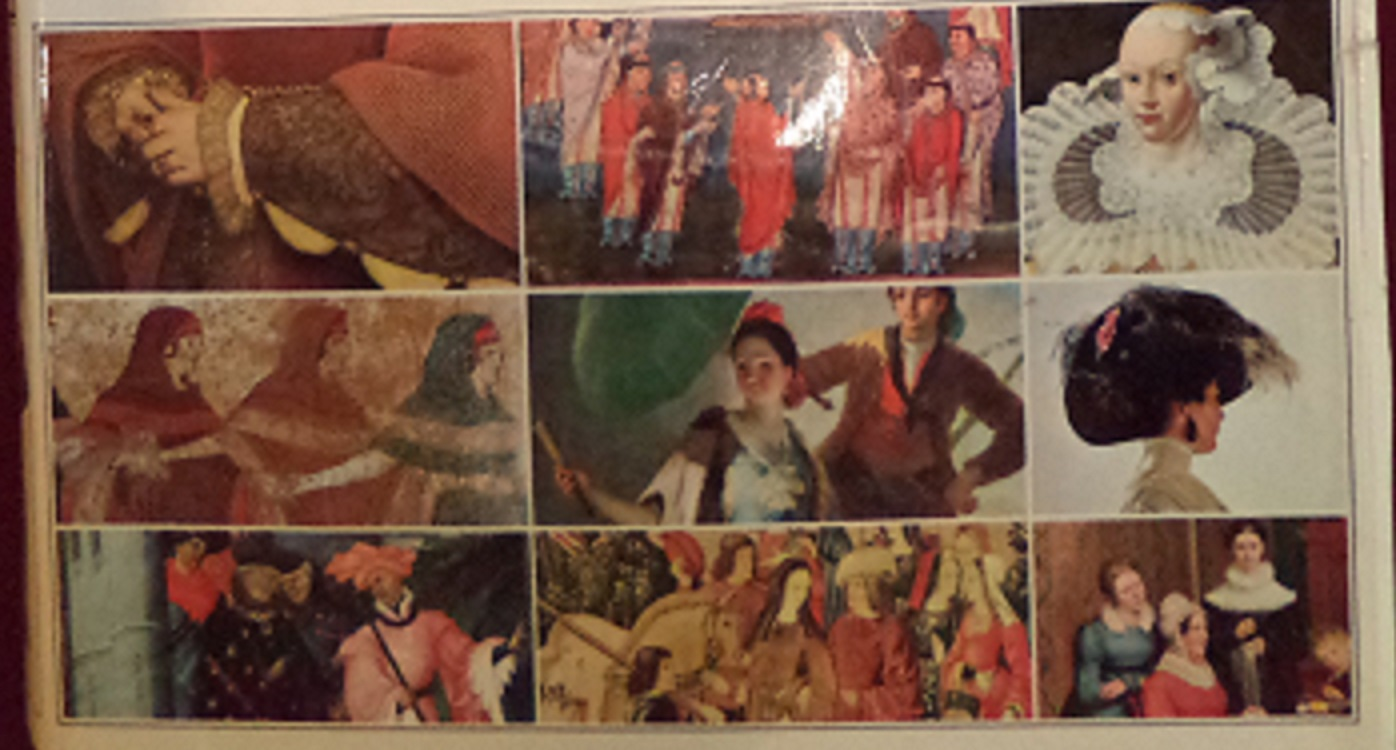
- Bottom half of book cover with details from colored plates
- Author: Francois Boucher; Yvonne Deslandres
- Language: English, French
- Genre: Art history
- Publisher: Harry N Abrams, Groupe Flammarion
- Publication date: 1963–66, 1987
- Publication place: United Kingdom, France, United States
- Pages: 441
- OCLC: 176250

20,000 Years of Fashion: The History of Costume and Personal Adornment is a dictionary of western fashion from ancient times up to the 1960s, edited by Francois Boucher and his longtime assistant Yvonne Deslandres.

== Overview ==
The book is widely cited as a reference for fashion trends in paintings and has 1150 illustrations which are mostly paintings, etchings and engravings from Western museums and collections. The book includes a glossary of terms and a bibliography of sources.

== Publishing ==
It was originally published in French in 1965 as Histoire du Costume en Occident de l’antiquité à nos jours and was translated into English the next year, but was published after Boucher's death. In 1987 Deslandres updated a new edition with a section on modern fashion.

== Bibliography ==
- Book review in Publishers Weekly
