= Musée de la mode et du textile =

Museum department in Paris, France

Coordinates: 48°51′47″N 2°20′0″E

The Musée de la mode et du textile (Museum of Fashion and Textiles) was a museum located in the Louvre Palace at, 107, rue de Rivoli, in the 1st arrondissement of Paris, France. It is now a department of the Musée des Arts Décoratifs, Paris. Works from the former museum are regularly displayed in temporary exhibitions.

== History ==
The museum dates to 1905 when the Musée des Arts Décoratifs started collecting outstanding examples of silks, embroidery, printed cotton, costumes, lace, and tapestry. In 1948, another collection of fashion and textiles was begun by the Union Française des Arts du Costume on an initiative by costume historian François Boucher. In 1981, the two collections merged, and in 1986, they opened to the public in the Louvre as a separate entity.

== Collections ==
The museum featured collections of over 81,000 works representing the history of costume from the French Regency period to the present (16,000 costumes and 35,000 fashion accessories), and textiles from the 7th century onwards (30,000 works), as well as examples of interior design, furniture, objets d'arts, wallpaper, tapestry, ceramic art, glassware, and toys from the Middle Ages to the present.

Important French fashion designers and textile artists whose works are held in the collection include Azzedine Alaïa, Pierre Balmain, André Courrèges, Christian Dior, Christian Lacroix, Jeanne Lanvin, Paul Poiret, Paco Rabanne, Yves Saint Laurent, Elsa Schiaparelli, Madeleine Vionnet, Sonia Delaunay, Raoul Dufy, and others.

== See also ==
- List of museums in Paris
