= Elsa Schiaparelli =

Italian fashion designer and couturier (1890–1973)

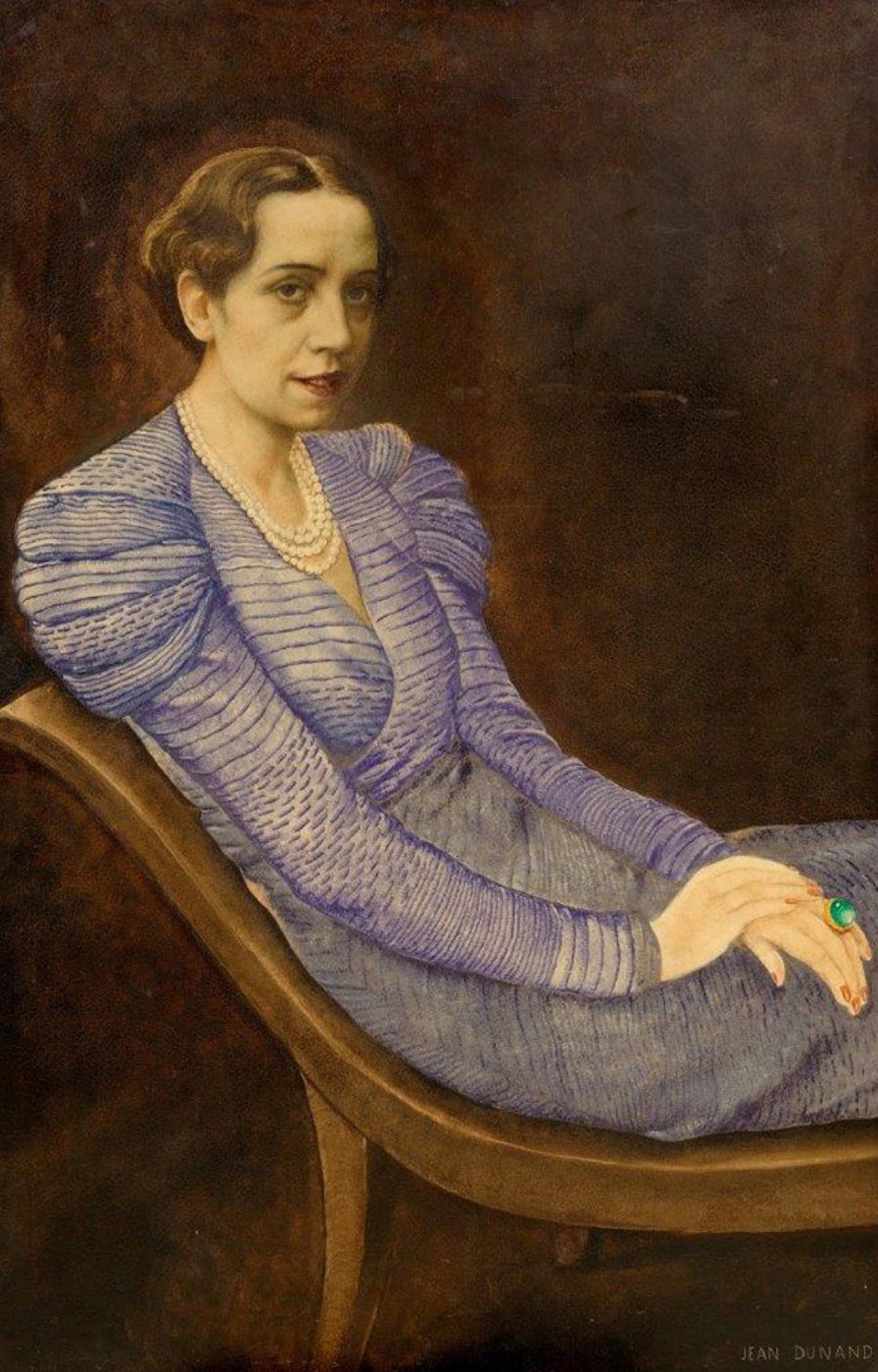
- Schiaparelli in 1933, wearing one of her own designs. Portrait by Jean Dunand
- Born: Elsa Luisa Giovanna Maria Schiaparelli; 10 September 1890; Rome, Kingdom of Italy
- Died: 13 November 1973 (aged 83); Paris, France
- Occupation: Fashion designer
- Spouse: Wilhelm Frederick Wendt de Kerlor (m. 1914; div. 1924)
- Children: 1
- Father: Celestino Schiaparelli
- Relatives: Giovanni Schiaparelli (uncle); Luigi Schiaparelli (first cousin once removed); Ernesto Schiaparelli (first cousin once removed); Marisa Berenson (granddaughter); Berry Berenson (granddaughter); Osgood Perkins (great-grandson); Elvis Perkins (great-grandson)

Elsa Luisa Giovanna Maria Schiaparelli (/ˌskæpəˈrɛli, ˌʃæp-/ SKAP-ə-REL-ee, SHAP-, US also /skiˌɑːp-/ skee-AHP-, Italian: [ˈɛlsa skjapaˈrɛlli]; 10 September 1890 – 13 November 1973) was an Italian fashion designer from an aristocratic background. She created Maison Schiaparelli (the House of Schiaparelli) in Paris in 1927, which she managed from the 1930s to the 1950s. Starting with knitwear, Schiaparelli's designs celebrated Surrealism and eccentric fashions. Her collections were famous for unconventional and artistic themes like the human body, insects, or trompe-l'œil, and for the use of bright colors like her "shocking pink".

Schiaparelli collaborated with Salvador Dalí and Jean Cocteau. Along with Coco Chanel, her greatest rival, she is regarded as one of the most prominent European figures in fashion between the two World Wars. Her clients included the heiress Daisy Fellowes and actress Mae West.

== Early life ==
Elsa Luisa Giovanna Maria Schiaparelli was born at the Palazzo Corsini, Rome. Her mother, Giuseppa Maria de Dominicis, was a Neapolitan aristocrat. Her father, Celestino Schiaparelli, a Piedmontese, was a scholar with multiple areas of interest. His studies focused on the Islamic world and the era of the Middle Ages and he was, in addition, an authority on Sanskrit and a curator of medieval manuscripts. He also served as Dean of the Sapienza University of Rome, where Schiaparelli herself later studied philosophy. His brother, astronomer Giovanni Schiaparelli, had discovered the so-called canali, or Martian canals, and the young Schiaparelli often studied the heavens with her uncle. A cousin of the brothers, Ernesto Schiaparelli, was an Egyptologist who discovered the tomb of Nefertari and was Director of the Museo Egizio in Turin.

The cultural background and erudition of her family members served to ignite the imaginative faculties of Schiaparelli's impressionable childhood years. She became enraptured with the lore of ancient cultures and religious rites. These sources inspired her to pen a volume of poems titled Arethusa based on the ancient Greek myth of the hunt. The content of her writing so alarmed the conservative sensibilities of her parents that they sought to tame her fantasy life by sending her to a convent boarding school in Switzerland. Once within the school's confines, Schiaparelli rebelled against its strict authority by going on a hunger strike, leaving her parents with no alternative but to bring her home.

Schiaparelli was dissatisfied by a lifestyle that, whilst refined and comfortable, she considered cloistered and unfulfilling. Her craving for adventure and exploration of the wider world led to her taking measures to remedy this, and when a friend offered her a job caring for orphaned children in an English country house, she saw an opportunity to leave. The placement, however, proved unsuitable to Schiaparelli, who subsequently planned a return to the stop-over city of Paris rather than admit defeat by returning to Rome and her family.

=== Marriage ===
Schiaparelli fled to London to avoid the certainty of marriage to a persistent suitor, a wealthy Russian whom her parents favored and for whom she felt no attraction. In London, Schiaparelli —who had held a fascination for psychic phenomena since childhood— attended a lecture on theosophy. The lecturer that night was Willem de Wendt, a man of various aliases who was also known as Willie Wendt and Wilhem de Kerlor. He was reported to have legally changed his name in England to Wilhelm Frederick Wendt de Kerlor, a combination of his father's last name and mother's maiden name. de Wendt's profession was that of a tireless, inventive self-promoter, in reality a con man who claimed to have psychic powers, and numerous academic credentials. He alternatively and simultaneously passed himself off as detective and criminal psychologist, doctor, and lecturer. In a stint on the vaudeville stage, de Kerlor billed himself as "The World Famous Dr. W. de Kerlor." Schiaparelli was immediately attracted to this charismatic charlatan and they became engaged the day after their first meeting. They married shortly thereafter in London on 21 July 1914; Schiaparelli was twenty-three, her new husband, thirty. De Kerlor attempted to earn a living aggrandizing his reputation as a psychic practitioner as the couple subsisted primarily on the wedding dowry and an allowance provided by Schiaparelli's wealthy parents. Schiaparelli played the role of her husband's helpmate and helped facilitate the promotion of his fraudulent schemes. In 1915, the couple were forced to leave England after de Kerlor was deported following his conviction for practicing fortune-telling, then illegal. They subsequently lived a peripatetic existence in Paris, Cannes, Nice, and Monte Carlo, before leaving for America in the spring of 1916.

The de Kerlors disembarked in New York, initially staying at the Brevoort, a prominent hotel in Greenwich Village, after which they relocated to an apartment above the Café des Artistes near Central Park West. De Kerlor rented offices to house his newly inaugurated "Bureau of Psychology" where he hoped to achieve fame and fortune through his paranormal and consulting work. His wife acted as his assistant, providing clerical support for self-promotions crafted to provide the newspapers with sensational copy, win celebrity, and garner acclaim. During this period de Kerlor came under the surveillance of the Federal government's Bureau of Investigation, (BOI) a precursor of the Federal Bureau of Investigation, (FBI), not only for his dubious professional practices but also on suspicion of harboring anti-British and pro-German allegiance during wartime. By 1917, de Kerlor's acquaintance with journalists John Reed and Louise Bryant had positioned him on the government radar as a possible Bolshevik sympathizer and Communist revolutionary. Attempting to avoid this unremitting scrutiny, the de Kerlors decamped to Boston in 1918, where they continued their activities as they had done in New York. De Kerlor, an incurable publicity hound, made imprudent admissions to a BOI investigator in prideful support of the Russian Revolution and went so far as to admit to an association with a notorious anarchist, whilst his wife incriminated herself by revealing that she was tutoring Italians in Boston's North End on the tenets of Bolshevism, and that she herself had the knowledge to assemble explosive devices. Both were ultimately spared prosecution or deportation, the authorities concluding that such admissions so freely given were more indicative of foolish grandstanding than evidence of individuals who were a threat to society.

Almost immediately after their child, Maria Luisa Yvonne Radha (nicknamed 'Gogo'), was born on 15 June 1920, de Kerlor moved out, leaving Schiaparelli alone with their newborn daughter. In later years, whenever Gogo asked her mother about her absent father, she was told that he was dead. Schiaparelli apparently made no efforts to bring her husband back or to seek support payments for herself and Gogo. In 1921, the 18-month-old Gogo was diagnosed with polio, which proved a stressful and protracted challenge for both mother and child. Years later, Gogo recalled spending her early years in plaster casts and on crutches, with a largely absent mother whom she barely saw. Fearing that de Kerlor would attempt to gain legal custody of Gogo, Schiaparelli had the child's surname legally changed to Schiaparelli prior to their return to France in 1922.

Schiaparelli relied greatly on the emotional support offered her by her close friend Gabrielle 'Gaby' Buffet-Picabia, the wife of Dada/Surrealist artist Francis Picabia, whom she had first met on board ship during the transatlantic crossing to America in 1916. Following de Kerlor's desertion, Schiaparelli returned to New York, attracted to its spirit of fresh beginnings and cultural vibrancy. Her interest in spiritualism translated into a natural affinity for the art of the Dada and Surrealist movements, and her friendship with Gaby Picabia facilitated entry into this creative circle which comprised noteworthy members such as Man Ray, Marcel Duchamp, Alfred Stieglitz, and Edward Steichen. Schiaparelli took a lover, the opera singer Mario Laurenti, but this relationship was cut short by Laurenti's death in 1922 after a sudden illness. Whilst they were together, de Kerlor had purportedly conducted affairs with the dancer Isadora Duncan and the actress Alla Nazimova.

Schiaparelli and de Kerlor were eventually divorced in March 1924. In 1928, de Kerlor was murdered in Mexico under circumstances never fully revealed.

== Return to Paris ==
Following the lead of Gabrielle Picabia and others, and after the death of her lover Laurenti, Schiaparelli left New York for France in 1922. Upon her arrival in Paris, she took an expensive apartment in a fashionable quarter of the city taking on the requisite servants, cook and maid. The self-made associations she formed over the years along with the eminent social position held by her Italian family combined to ensure that she would be embraced by desirable social circles on her return to France.

Although never threatened with destitution as she continued to receive financial support from her mother, Schiaparelli nevertheless felt the need to earn an independent income. She assisted Man Ray with his Dada magazine Société Anonyme, which proved short lived. Gaby Picabia then suggested a business enterprise which would be beneficial to herself and Schiaparelli. Connected to the French couturier Paul Poiret through her association with his sister Nicole Groult, Picabia proposed that they sell French couture in America. This proposed project, however, never became a viable enterprise and was abandoned.

== Fashion career ==
Schiaparelli's design career was early on influenced by couturier Paul Poiret, who was renowned for jettisoning corseted, over-long dresses and promoting styles that enabled freedom of movement for the modern, elegant and sophisticated woman. In later life, Schiaparelli referred to Poiret as "a generous mentor, dear friend."

Schiaparelli had no training in the technical skills of pattern making and clothing construction. Her method of approach relied on both impulse of the moment and the serendipitous inspiration as the work progressed. She draped fabric directly on the body, sometimes using herself as the model. This technique followed the lead of Poiret who too had created garments by manipulating and draping. The results appeared uncontrived and wearable.

=== House of Schiaparelli (Maison Schiaparelli) ===
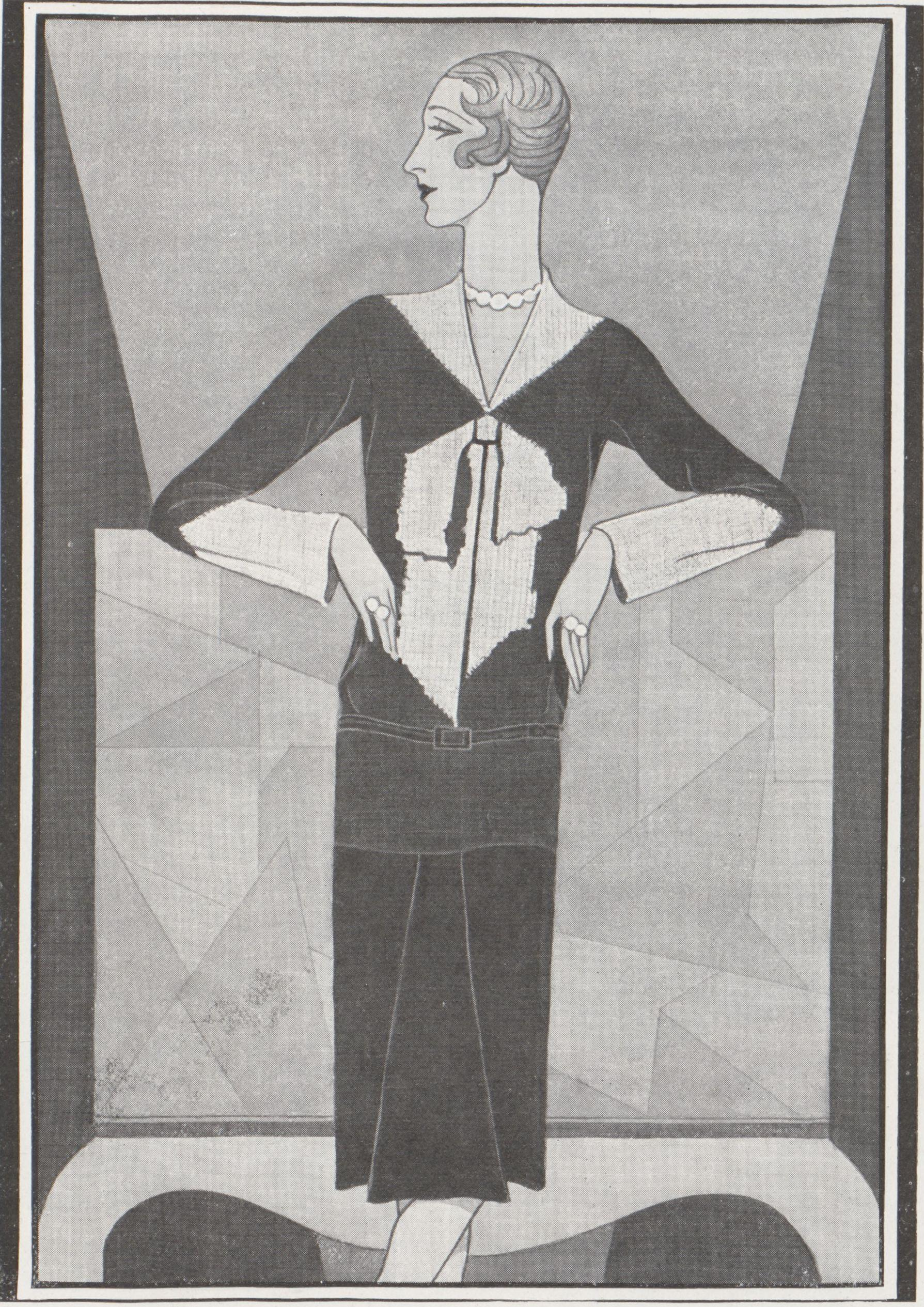
Bow-knot sweater designed by Elsa Schiaparelli (1927). Anonymous drawing published on Vogue (Paris), vol. 8, no. 12, 1st December 1927, p. 9

Whilst in Paris, Schiaparelli—"Schiap" to her friends—began making her own clothes. With encouragement from Poiret, she started her own business, but it closed in 1926 despite favourable reviews. She launched a new collection of knitwear in early 1927 using a special double layered stitch created by Armenian refugees and featuring sweaters with surrealist trompe-l'œil images. Although her first designs appeared in Vogue, the business really took off with a sweater that had a trompe l'oeil design of a bow knitted into the fabric. The "pour le Sport" collection expanded the following year to include bathing suits, ski-wear, and linen dresses. Schiaparelli added evening wear to her collections in 1931, using the luxury silks of Robert Perrier, and the business went from strength to strength, in 1935, culminating in a move from Rue de la Paix to acquiring the renowned salon of Louise Chéruit at 21 Place Vendôme, which was rechristened the Schiap Shop. Schiaparelli's 98-room salon and work studios occupied the distinguished Hôtel de Fontpertuis, built in the 17th century by Pierre Bullet.

'Or give me a new Muse with stockings and suspenders
And a smile like a cat
With false eyelashes and finger-nails of carmine
And dressed by Schiaparelli, with a pill-box hat.'

— Louis MacNeice, Autumn Journal, stanza XV, 1939.

Colin McDowell noted that by 1939 Schiaparelli was well known enough in intellectual circles to be mentioned as the epitome of modernity by the Irish poet Louis MacNeice. Although McDowell cites MacNeice's reference as from Bagpipe Music, it is actually from stanza XV of Autumn Journal.

A darker tone was set when France declared war on Germany in 1939. Schiaparelli's Spring 1940 collection featured "trench" brown and camouflage print taffetas. Soon after the fall of Paris on 14 June 1940, Schiaparelli sailed to New York for a lecture tour; apart from a few months in Paris in early 1941, she remained in New York City until the end of the war. On her return she found that fashions had changed, with Christian Dior's "New Look" marking a rejection of pre-war fashion. The house of Schiaparelli struggled in the austerity of the post-war period. Schiaparelli discontinued her couture business in 1951, and finally closed down the heavily indebted design house in December 1954, the same year that her great rival Coco Chanel returned to the business.

=== Elsa Schiaparelli SAS ===
In 1957, Schiaparelli created a company mainly for her perfume licences. The company was acquired in 2007 by Italian businessman Diego Della Valle. In September 2013 Marco Zanini was appointed as its creative director. In 2014 this company was transformed to a fashion house with the trade name Schiaparelli. The first time after the house was nominated as a member of the Chambre Syndicale de la Haute Couture presented a show was in January 2014. Its first collection was sold exclusively at a by-appointment boutique in Paris. While originally not founded as a fashion house, the company nowadays associates itself in marketing with the fashion legacy of its founder Elsa.

== Later life and death ==
In 1954, Schiaparelli published her autobiography Shocking Life and then lived out a comfortable retirement between her Paris apartment and her house in Tunisia. She died on 13 November 1973, at the age of 83.

== Notable designs ==
Schiaparelli was one of the first designers to develop the wrap dress, taking inspiration from aprons to produce a design that would accommodate and flatter all female body types. Her design, which first appeared in 1930, offered a two-sided model with armholes on each side, brought together in the front of the garment and wrapped and tied at the waistline. Buttons may also have been incorporated into this early version. Initially conceived as beachwear and produced in four colours of tussore silk, the dress was popular with buyers and copied by garment manufacturers as a design for everyday street wear. Some forty years afterwards, this uncomplicated and easy-to-wear design was revisited in the 1970s by the American designer Diane von Fürstenberg.

In 1931, Schiaparelli's divided skirt—a forerunner of shorts—shocked the tennis world when worn by Lili de Alvarez at Wimbledon in 1931.

Other innovations included a swimsuit design which incorporated an interior bra with an alluring low-cut back by using hidden straps that crossed in the back and closed around the waist. This design was patented in 1930 and retailed by Best & Company. Other designs were made with detachable elements and reversible sections. Also in 1930, she is credited with having produced the first evening dress with a matching jacket. During Prohibition in the United States, Schiaparelli's popularly named "speakeasy dress" provided a hidden pocket for a flask for alcoholic beverage.

Most of the shoes in her collections during the 1930s and '40s were by Perugia, who developed stretch shoes for her that didn't need fasteners, but in 1937 Schiaparelli became the first couturier to show shoes by Roger Vivier.

=== Fastenings ===
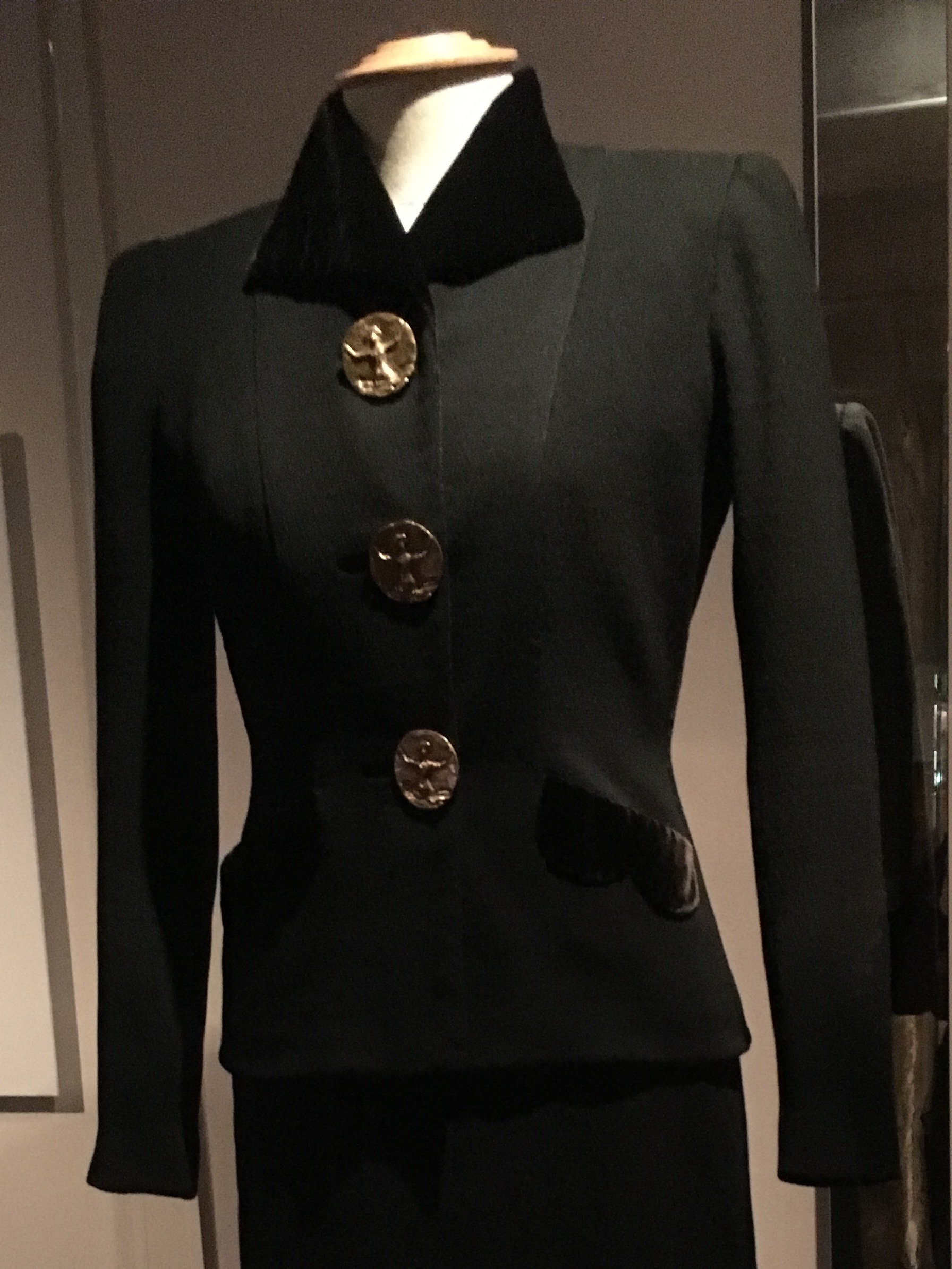
1938–39 Schiaparelli suit with large buttons sculpted by Alberto Giacometti

Schiaparelli is one of the designers credited with offering the first clothes with visible zippers in 1930. Rather than being concealed, zippers became a key element of Schiaparelli's designs, visibly fastening necklines and running down sleeves and skirts. She used chunky plastic zippers made from cellulose nitrate, the first semi-synthetic plastic fabric, and cellulose acetate. Along with Charles James, Schiaparelli had arrangements with the manufacturers to promote their zip fasteners, using specific brands depending on where the garment would be sold (such as Éclair for Paris models, Lightning Fastener Co. for London models, and Hookless Fastener Co. zips for American export models).

Schiaparelli was also renowned for her unusual buttons, which could resemble candlesticks, playing card emblems, ships, crowns, mirrors, and crickets; or silver tambourines and silk-covered carrots and cauliflowers. Many of these fastenings were designed by Jean Clemént and Roger Jean-Pierre who also created jewellery for her. In 1936, Schiaparelli was one of the first people to recognise the potential of Jean Schlumberger who she originally employed as a designer of buttons.

=== Jewellery ===
Schiaparelli's output also included distinctive costume jewellery in a wide range of novelty designs. One of her most directly Surrealist designs was a 1938 Rhodoid (a newly developed clear plastic) necklace studded with coloured metallic insects by Clément giving the illusion that the bugs were crawling directly on the wearer's skin. During the 1930s her jewellery designs were produced by Schlumberger, Clemént and Jean-Pierre, who also made up designs for buttons and fasteners. Schlumberger's jewellery with its inventive combinations of precious and semi-precious stones proved successful, and at the end of the 1930s, he left to launch his jewellery business in New York. Schiaparelli also offered brooches by Alberto Giacometti, fur-lined metal cuffs by Méret Oppenheim, and pieces by Max Boinet, Lina Baretti, and the writer Elsa Triolet. Compared to her unusual couture 1930s pieces, 1940s and 1950s Schiaparelli jewellery tended to be more abstract or floral-themed.

Schiaparelli's jewelry in the 1930s showcased her penchant for bold material choices, such as glass stones, cabochons, dyed pearls, and iridescent seashells, often assembled in shapes and colors that had not been seen before. Her Surrealist influence was evident in pieces like lip-shaped brooches with pearls for teeth and lobster pins. Elsa Schiaperelli was a big fan of Salvador Dalí and the Surrealist movement, which noticeably influenced her own designs in the 1930s and 1940s. Schiaparelli presented some of her jewelry at the influential Exposition of Modern Industrial and Decorative Arts in 1925.

=== Textiles ===
Schiaparelli was noted for her use of innovative textiles which were woven to resemble textures such as tree bark or crepe paper; a plush made to mimic ermine; and novelty prints including a fabric patterned with newspaper clippings. She made garments from crumpled rayon 50 years before Issey Miyake produced similarly pleated and crinkled pieces. Schiaparelli enjoyed playing with juxtapositions of colours, shapes, and textures, and embraced the new technologies and materials of the time. With Charles Colcombet she experimented with acrylic, cellophane, a rayon jersey called "Jersela,” and a rayon with metal threads called "Fildifer"—the first time synthetic materials had been used in couture. Some of these innovations were not pursued further, like her 1934 "glass" cape made from Rhodophane, a transparent plastic related to cellophane. Making clothes from these new and untested fabrics posed unexpected hazards—Diana Vreeland had a Schiaparelli dress melt at the dry cleaners' after its synthetic fabric reverted to chemical sludge upon contact with the cleaning fluids.

=== Artist collaborations ===
Evening coat designed in collaboration with Jean Cocteau, London, 1937. V&A, T.59-2005.

Schiaparelli's fanciful imaginative powers coupled with involvement in the Dada/Surrealist art movements directed her into new creative territory. Her instinctive sensibilities soon came to distinguish her creations from her chief rival Coco Chanel, who referred to her as 'that Italian artist who makes clothes'. Schiaparelli collaborated with a number of contemporary artists, most famously with Salvador Dalí, to develop a number of her most notable designs. Schiaparelli also had a good relationship with other artists including Leonor Fini, Méret Oppenheim, and Alberto Giacometti.

In 1937 Schiaparelli collaborated with the artist Jean Cocteau to produce two of her most notable art-themed designs for that year's Autumn collection. An evening jacket was embroidered with a female figure with one hand caressing the waist of the wearer, and long blonde hair cascading down one sleeve. A long evening coat featured two profiles facing each other, creating the optical illusion of a vase of roses. The embroidering of both garments was executed by the couture embroiderers Lesage.

==== Dalí ====
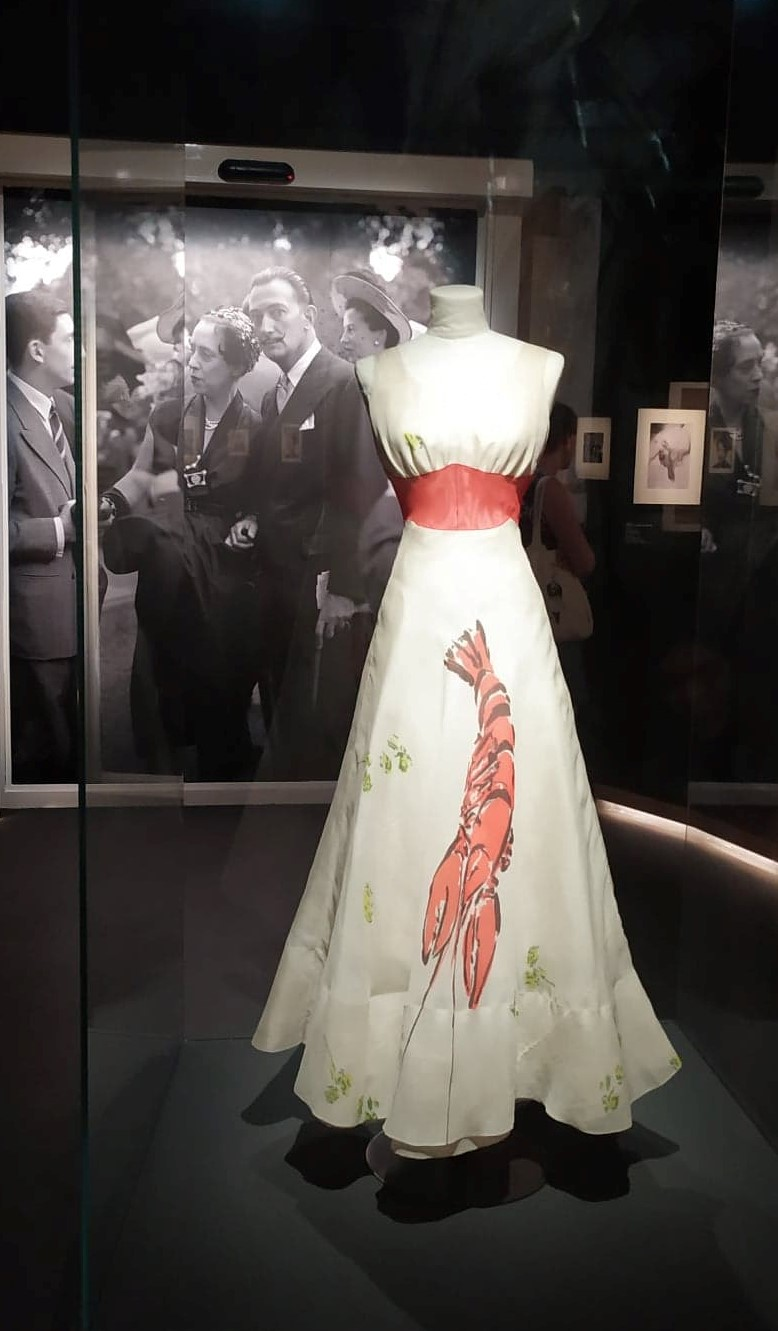
1937 Lobster Dress by Elsa Schiaparelli with Dalí textile print

The designs Schiaparelli produced in collaboration with Dalí are among her best known. In addition to well-documented collaborations such as the shoe hat and the Lobster, Tears, and Skeleton dresses, Dalí's influence has been identified in designs such as the lamb-cutlet hat and a 1936-day suit with pockets simulating a chest of drawers. While Schiaparelli did not formally name her designs, the four main garments from her partnership with Dalí are popularly known as follows:

Lobster dress

The 1937 Lobster dress was a simple white silk evening dress with a crimson waistband featuring a large lobster painted (by Dalí) onto the skirt. From 1934, Dalí had started incorporating lobsters into his work, including New York Dream-Man Finds Lobster in Place of Phone shown in the magazine American Weekly in 1935, and the mixed-media Lobster Telephone (1936). His design for Schiaparelli was interpreted into a fabric print by the leading silk designer Sache. It was famously worn by Wallis Simpson in a series of photographs by Cecil Beaton taken at the Château de Candé shortly before her marriage to Edward VIII.

Tears Dress

The Tears Dress, a slender pale-blue evening gown printed with a Dalí design of trompe-l'œil rips and tears, worn with a thigh-length veil with "real" tears carefully cut out and lined in pink and magenta, was part of the February 1938 Circus Collection. The print was intended to give the illusion of torn animal flesh, the tears printed to represent fur on the reverse of the fabric and suggest that the dress was made of animal pelts turned inside out. Figures in ripped, skin-tight clothing suggesting flayed flesh appeared in three of Dalí's 1936 paintings, one of which, Necrophiliac Springtime, was owned by Schiaparelli; the other two are The Dream Places a Hand on a Man's Shoulder and Three Young Surrealist Women Holding in Their Arms the Skins of an Orchestra. Richard Martin saw the Tears Dress as a memento mori produced in response to the Spanish Civil War and the spread of Fascism, declaring that to "tear the dress is to deny its customary decorum and utility, and to question the matter of concealment and revelation in the garment." He noted that even if the tears in the dress were mere ornament like slashing, the real tears on the veil negated this, offering visual disagreements between reality and pretence.

Skeleton Dress

Dalí also helped Schiaparelli design the Skeleton Dress for the Circus Collection. It was a stark black crepe dress which used trapunto quilting to create padded ribs, spine, and leg bones.

Shoe Hat

In 1933, Dalí was photographed by his wife Gala Dalí with one of her slippers balanced on his head. In 1937 he sketched designs for a shoe hat for Schiaparelli, which she featured in her Fall-Winter 1937–38 collection. The hat, shaped like a woman's high-heeled shoe, had the heel standing straight up and the toe tilted over the wearer's forehead. This hat was worn by Gala Dalí, Schiaparelli herself, and by the Franco-American editor of the French Harper's Bazaar, heiress Daisy Fellowes, who was one of Schiaparelli's best clients.

=== Film costumes ===
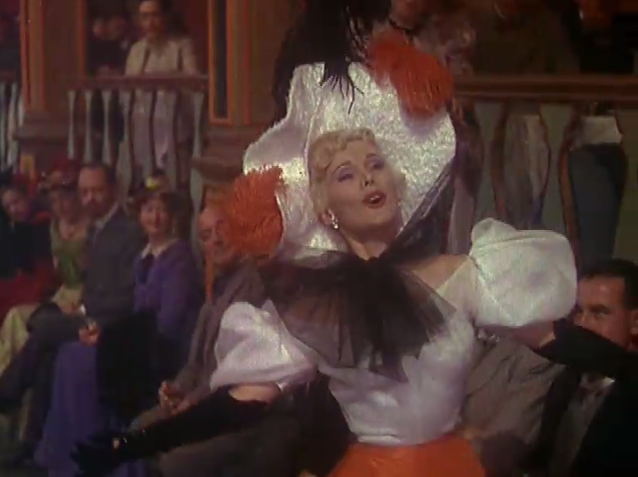
Zsa Zsa Gabor in Moulin Rouge, 1952

Schiaparelli designed the wardrobes for several films, starting with the French version of 1933's Topaze, and ending with Zsa Zsa Gabor's outfits for the 1952 biopic of Henri de Toulouse-Lautrec, Moulin Rouge in which Gabor played Jane Avril. Moulin Rouge won Marcel Vertès an Academy Award for Costume Design, although Schiaparelli's role in costuming the leading lady went unacknowledged beyond a prominent on-screen credit for Gabor's costumes. Authentically, Gabor's costumes were directly based upon Toulouse-Lautrec's portraits of Avril.

She famously dressed Mae West for Every Day's a Holiday (1937) using a mannequin based on West's measurements, which inspired the torso bottle for Shocking perfume.

== Legacy ==
The failure of her business meant that Schiaparelli's name is not as well remembered as that of her great rival Chanel. But in 1934, Time placed Chanel in the second division of fashion, whereas Schiaparelli was one of "a handful of houses now at or near the peak of their power as arbiters of the ultra-modern haute couture....Madder and more original than most of her contemporaries, Mme Schiaparelli is the one to whom the word 'genius' is applied most often". At the same time Time recognised that Chanel had assembled a fortune of some US$15m despite being "not at present the most dominant influence in fashion", whereas Schiaparelli relied on inspiration rather than craftsmanship and "it was not long before every little dress factory in Manhattan had copied them and from New York's 3rd Avenue to San Francisco's Howard Street millions of shop girls who had never heard of Schiaparelli were proudly wearing her models".

In 2022, Schiaparelli was included in Ferren Gipson's book exploring feminine arts and feminist art.

== Perfumes ==
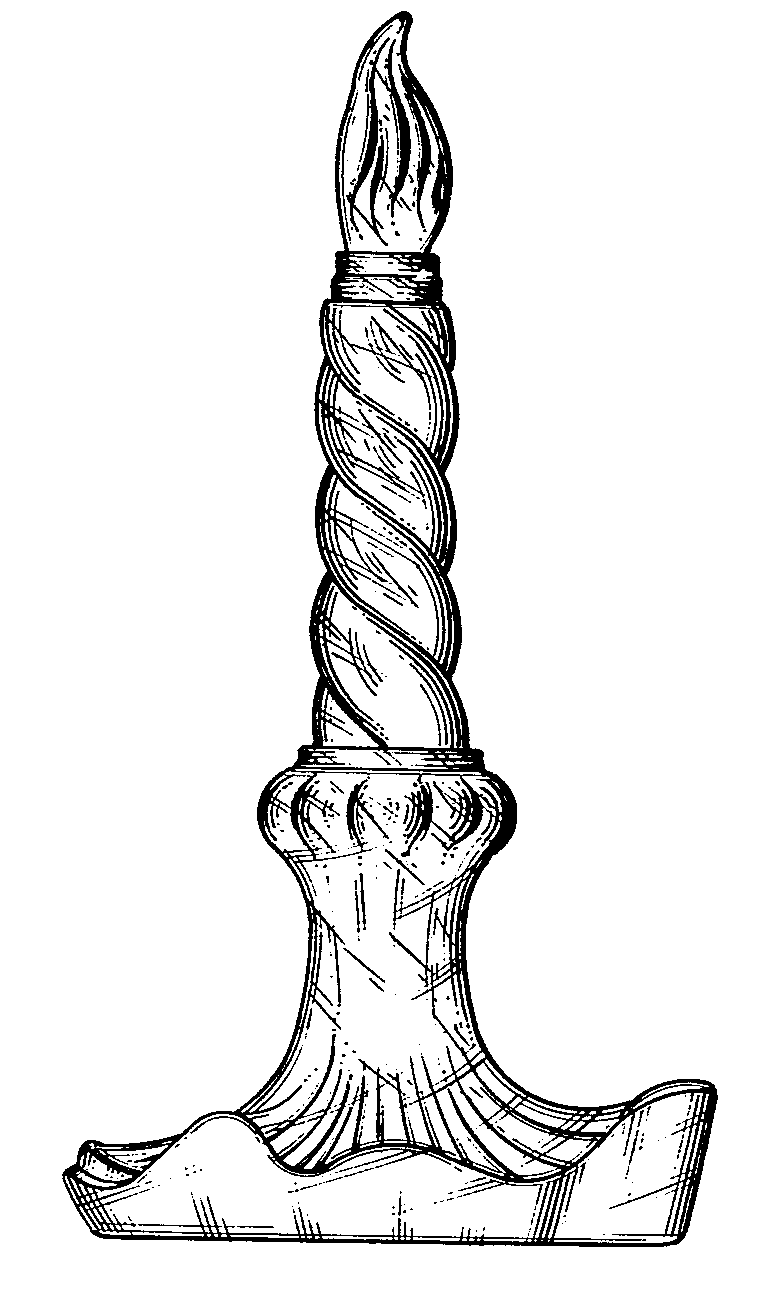
Sleeping perfume bottle shaped like a candlestick. Designed by Marcel Vertès (1939).

Schiaparelli's perfumes were noted for their unusual packaging and bottles. Her best-known perfume was "Shocking!" (1936), contained in a bottle sculpted by Leonor Fini in the shape of a woman's torso inspired by Mae West's tailor's dummy and Dalí paintings of flower-sellers. The packaging, also designed by Fini, was in shocking pink, one of Schiaparelli's signature colours which was said to have been inspired by Daisy Fellowes' Tête de Belier (Ram's Head) pink diamond.

Other perfumes included:

- Salut (1934)
- Souci (1934)
- Schiap (1934)
- Sleeping (1938)
- Snuff (for men; 1939)
- Roi Soleil (1946)
- Zut! (1948)

== Family ==
Schiaparelli's two granddaughters, from her daughter's marriage to shipping executive Robert L. Berenson, were model Marisa Berenson and photographer Berry Berenson. Both sisters appeared regularly in Vogue in the early 1970s. Berry was married to the actor Anthony Perkins, with whom she had two children, filmmaker Osgood Perkins and musician Elvis Perkins. In 2014, Marisa collaborated with Hubert de Givenchy to publish the book Elsa Schiaparelli's Private Album which reproduced photographs from her grandmother's personal archives.

== Exhibitions ==
- "Shocking!" The Art and Fashion of Elsa Schiaparelli, at the Philadelphia Museum of Art (September 2003 – January 2004) and the Musée de la Mode, Paris (March–August 2004).
- Schiaparelli and Prada: Impossible Conversations; The Costume Institute of The Metropolitan Museum of Art (May–August 2012)
- Couturier Christian Lacroix presented a tribute fashion collection to Schiaparelli at the Musee des Arts Decoratifs in 2013.
- Schiaparelli: Fashion Becomes Art at London's Victoria and Albert Museum, 2026

== Notes and references ==
=== Bibliography ===
- Division of Education at the Philadelphia Museum of Art. "Shocking! The Art and Fashion of Elsa Schiaparelli – teacher's pack" (PDF). Philadelphia Museum of Art. Archived from the original (PDF) on 29 May 2008.
- Handley, Susannah (19 January 2000). Nylon: The Story of a Fashion Revolution. Johns Hopkins University Press. p. 192. ISBN 978-0-8018-6325-7.
- Martin, Richard (1996). Fashion & Surrealism (Reprint ed.). Rizzoli International Publications. ISBN 978-0-8478-1073-4.
- Scarisbrick, Diana (2004). Historic rings : four thousand years of craftsmanship (1st ed.). Tokyo: Kodansha International. p. 211. ISBN 9784770025401.
- Secrest, Meryle (2014). Elsa Schiaparelli : a biography. Alfred A Knopf. ISBN 978-0307701596.
- Steele, Valerie, ed. (2005). Encyclopaedia of Clothing & Fashion. Thomson Gale. pp. 146. ISBN 0-684-31397-9.
- White, Palmer; St Laurent (Foreword), Yves (May 1996). Elsa Schiaparelli: Empress of Paris Fashion (Updated ed.). Aurum Press. ISBN 978-1-85410-358-1.
