= Lobster dress =

1937 dress

- Designer: Elsa Schiaparelli
- Year: 1937
- Type: Evening gown or Dinner dress
- Material: Silk

The lobster dress is a 1937 dress designed by Elsa Schiaparelli. It features a large lobster painted by Salvador Dalí.

== Design ==
The dress is an A-line off-white silk evening or dinner dress with a crimson waistband featuring a large lobster painted by Salvador Dalí onto the skirt. The initial lobster motif was drawn by Dalí and printed onto the dress by the silk designer Sache. The dress is also illustrated with sprigs of parsley. The dress is made from printed silk organza and synthetic horsehair.

The front of the dress is 52 inches (132 cm) in length, with a waist measurement of 22 inches (56 cm). Schiaparelli prevented Dalí from adding mayonnaise to the completed dress.

== History ==
From 1934, Dalí had started incorporating lobsters into his work, including New York Dream-Man Finds Lobster in Place of Phone shown in the magazine American Weekly in 1935, and the mixed-media Lobster Telephone (1936). Dalí saw lobsters as symbolic of sexuality. The lobster is placed low on the dress, between the legs of the wearer, with the tail of the lobster fanning upward toward the wearer's Mons Veneris, and its claws towards her calves. The lobster dress made its debut as part of Schiaparelli's Summer/Fall 1937 collection.

The dress was worn by Wallis Simpson in photographs taken by Cecil Beaton at the Château de Candé, shortly before Simpson's marriage to Edward VIII. Beaton's photographs of Simpson would be featured in Vogue magazine in an eight-page spread in June 1937. The dress was included as part of Simpson's wedding trousseau. It was illustrated in Women's Wear Daily in May 1937 as a feature on Simpson's spring wardrobe. In her book, Nevertheless, She Wore It: 50 Iconic Fashion Moments, Ann Shen wrote that in Simpson's wearing of the dress "was charged with erotic flippancy" and gave the British public "even more reason to hate Wallis" in the aftermath of her husband's abdication as British monarch. Shen felt that the dress shows "the power of innovation and sexual empowerment in a woman – and the impact art and fashion can have". Schiaparelli and Dalí would subsequently create a 'Shoe Hat' (1937–38) and the 'Skeleton Dress' (1938) together.

The dress was reimagined by Miuccia Prada in 2012 to mark the opening of the retrospective Schiaparelli and Prada: Impossible Conversations at the Metropolitan Museum of Art in New York City and worn by Anna Wintour at the 2012 Met Gala. The dress was reimagined by Schiaparelli's Creative Director Bertrand Guyon for their Spring 2017 collection of haute couture. Guyon's dress took 6 people some 250 hours to make, with the lobster appliqué sewn by hand onto the skirt.

Schiaparelli donated her own copy of the dress to the Philadelphia Museum of Art in 1969. The dress was extensively analysed by Claire Eldred in her essay "Encounters and Exchanges with Elsa Schiaparelli's Lobster Dress: an Object Biography" in the 2019 book Fashion and Contemporaneity: Realms of the Visible.

== See also ==
- List of individual dresses
- List of works by Salvador Dalí
