= List of bishops of the Reformed Episcopal Church =

These are the bishops consecrated in the Reformed Episcopal Church from its founding in 1873 to the present, along with the bishops consecrated in the Free Church of England from REC episcopal succession.

No.	Bishop	Consecration	Consecrator	Active in	Notes
1	George David Cummins (1822–1876)	15 November 1866	Hopkins, Smith, Lee	New York and Philadelphia	Presiding Bishop, 1873-1876
2	Charles Edward Cheney (1836–1916)	14 December 1873	1	Chicago	Presiding Bishop, 1876–1877, 1887–1889
3	William Rufus Nicholson (1822–1901)	24 February 1876	1, 2	New York and Philadelphia	Presiding Bishop, 1879–1883
4	Edward Cridge (1817–1913)	16 July 1876	2, 3	Canada (Jurisdiction of the Pacific Coast)	
5	Samuel Fallows (1835–1922)	16 July 1876	2, 3	Chicago	Presiding Bishop, 1877–1879, 1889–1894, 1902–1922
6	John Sugden (1820–1897)	20 August 1876	4, Price	England	
7	Thomas Huband Gregg (1840–1896)	20 June 1877	5, 2, 3	England	
8	Peter Fayssoux Stevens (1830–1910)	22 June 1879	3, 5	South	
9	James Allen Latané (1831–1902)	22 June 1879	3, 5	New York and Philadelphia	Presiding Bishop, 1883–1887, 1900-1902
10	Alfred Spencer Richardson (1842–1907)	22 June 1879	3, 5	England	
11	Hubert Bower (1835–1895)	19 August 1879	6, 10	England	
12	Edward Wilson (d. 1908)	1 July 1880	3, 9	Canada	
13	Thomas Greenland (1826–1904)	11 June 1888	10, 6, 11	England	
14	Thomas W. Campbell (1851–1918)	31 May 1891	5, 3, 9	Canada; Brooklyn, NY	Presiding Bishop, 1894-1897
15	Philip X. Eldridge (1846–1921)	24 June 1892	6, 13	England	
16	James Renney (d. 1894)	24 June 1892	6, 13	England	
17	William T. Sabine (1838–1913)	23 October 1902	5, 2	New York and Philadelphia	
18	Herman S. Hoffman (1841–1912)	3 June 1903	5, 8, 17		
19	Robert Livingston Rudolph (d. 1930)	12 January 1909	5, 2, 17	New York and Philadelphia	Presiding Bishop, 1922-1930
20	Manuel Ferrando (1868–1934)	12 November 1912	5, 2, 19	Puerto Rico	
21	Frank Vaughan (d. 1962)	25 April 1913	15	Northern England	Bishop Primus, Free Church of England
22	Arthur Lorne Pengelley (1879–1922)	25 June 1914	5, 2, 19	South	
23	Willard Brewing (d. 1960)	24 June 1914	5, 2, 19	Chicago	
24	Joseph Louis Fenn	21 September 1921	21	Southern England	
25	Robert Westly Peach (1863–1936)	23 May 1924	19, 21, 23	New York and Philadelphia	Presiding Bishop, 1930-1936
26	Joseph Edgar Kearney (d. 1981)	23 May 1930	19, 21, 25	South	Presiding Bishop, 1951-1957
27	Frank V. C. Cloak (1876–1953)	9 November 1931	25, 26	Chicago	Presiding Bishop, 1937-1951
28	John Christie Magee (d. 1955)	7 July 1932	21, 24	Southern England	
29	George Marshall (d. 1945)	7 July 1932	21, 24	England	
30	Alexander Melbourne Hubley (1846–1937)	11 May 1933	27, 29	Canada	
31	Howard David Higgins (1903–1980)	9 January 1937	26, 27, 29	New York and Philadelphia	Presiding Bishop, 1957-1975
32	William Culbertson III (1905–1971)	30 April 1937	27, 26, 31	New York and Philadelphia	
33	George W. Forbes-Smith (d. 1976)	29 September 1938	21, 28	Southern England	
34	Donald Argyle Thompson	29 September 1938	21, 28	England	
35	Archibald R. L. Keevil (1881–1953)	11 June 1944	29, 27	Canada	
36	George A. Veck	8 June 1947	35	Canada	
37	Thomas Cameron	21 September 1950	21, 16, 335	Northern England	Bishop Primus, Free Church of England
38	Denys A. G. Rankilor (d. 1972)	12 December 1954	36	Canada	
39	William Rodgers	18 October 1957	33, 37	England	
40	William H. S. Jerdan Jr. (d. 2001)	27 May 1960	31, 32, 26	South	Presiding Bishop, 1987-1990
41	Ambrose Martin Bodfish (d. 1973)	4 September 1963	37, 33	Southern England	
42	James Dudley Burrell (d. 1973)	4 September 1963	37, 33	Northern England	
43	Sanco King Rembert (1922–2015)	26 May 1966	31, 32, 40, 26	Southeast	
44	Theophilus John Herter (1913–1987)	15 June 1966	35	New York and Philadelphia	Presiding Bishop, 1975-1987
45	William Charles Watkins	8 October 1969	37, 42, 41, 33	Southern England	
46	Cyril Milner (b. 1916)	29 August 1973	37, 42, 45	Northern England	Bishop Primus, Free Church of England
47	Franklin Henry Sellers (1926–2016)	5 December 1974	31, 44, 26	Chicago	Presiding Bishop, 1990-1996
48	Leonard W. Riches (1939–2024)	14 June 1975	44, 31, 40, 43, 47	New York and Philadelphia/Northeast and Mid-Atlantic	Presiding Bishop, 1996–2014
49	Arthur Ward	11 September 1976	46, 37, 44, White	Southern England	
50	Daniel Gilbert Cox (1931–2021)	6 June 1984	44, 40, 43, 48, 47		
51	Royal U. Grote Jr. (1946–2016)	7 June 1984	44, 40, 43, 48, 47	Mid-America	Presiding Bishop, 2014–2016
52	James Cortez West (1944–2006)	24 June 1984	44, 50, 51, 40, 43, 48, 47	Southeast	
53	Kenneth J. W. Powell	1 October 1986	46, 49	Southern England	Bishop Primus, Free Church of England
54	Robert Harold Booth (1929–2020)	14 June 1990	48, 51, 43, 52		
55	Michael Fedechko (1937–2019)	19 August 1993	51, 54, 53	Canada	
56	E. A. "Ted" Follows (1926–2013)	12 September 1993	51, 54, 55	Canada	
57	Gregory Keith Hotchkiss	8 June 1996	48, 54, 50, 51, 43		Renounced episcopal office, 30 November 2003
58	George Brian Fincke (1953–2016)	21 June 1996	48, 43, 52, 51		Served in Anglican Province of America
59	Charles Dorrington (b. 1940)	23 June 1996	48, 51, 43, 52, 56	Western Canada and Alaska	
60	Daniel R. Morse (b. 1944)	23 August 1996	48, 47, 57, 43, 52, 51, 55, 59	Central States	
61	Oommen Samuel	15 September 1996	48, 50, 55, 54, 57		
62	John Barry Shucksmith (1937–2022)	19 August 1993	46, 53, 48	England	
63	Ray R. Sutton (b. 1950)	29 July 1999	48, 53, 51, 60, 52, 43, 54, 58, Grundorf	Mid-America	Presiding Bishop, 2016–present
64	John McLean	11 September 1999	53, 48, 51	England	
65	Arthur Bentley-Taylor	19 August 1993	53, 54, 51	Northern England	
66	David L. Hicks (b. 1963)	16 July 2005	48, 51, 63, 52, 54, 50, 61, 58, Grundorf, Boyce	Northeast and Mid-Atlantic	
67	Paul Nigel Hunt (b. 1952)	22 July 2006	53, 64, 51, Sutton	Southern England	
68	John R. K. Fenwick	22 July 2006	64, 53, 51, Sutton	Northern England	Bishop Primus, Free Church of England
69	Gerhard Meyer	22 October 2006	58, 51, 53	Germany	
70	Alphonza Gadsden Sr. (1945–2025)	17 November 2007	48, 43, 51, 66	Southeast	
71	William J. White (b. 1947)	17 January 2009	48, 43, 70, 51, 66, 63	Southeast	
72	R. Charles Gillin (b. 1951)	29 September 2012	48, 51, 66, 60, Lipka	Northeast and Mid-Atlantic	
73	Jasmin Milić (b. 1969)	13 May 2013	51, 67, 69	Croatia	
74	Peter F. Manto (b. 1950)	6 December 2013	Duncan, 48, 51, 66, 60, Ames	Central States	
75	Raul Willians Mendez Suarez (b. 1951)	24 May 2014	59, Walters, Uchoa	Cuba	
76	Josep Miquel Rossello Ferrer	28 September 2014	68, 67, 69	South America	
77	Walter Banek (b. 1952)	23 August 2017	Beach, 63, 70, 71, 74, Guernsey, Atwood, Menees, Hobby, Andrews	Mid-America	
78	Willie J. Hill Jr. (b. 1951)	13 June 2022	Beach, 63, 70, 71, 72, 74, 77, Guernsey, Lowenfield, Lebhar, Bryan, Murdoch	Southeast	
79	William A. Jenkins Sr. (b. 1963)	29 April 2023	Beach, 63, 70, 71, 72, 74, 77, 78, Dobbs, Iker	Northeast and Mid-Atlantic	
80	John Boonzaaijer (b. 1968)	15 February 2024	63, Beach, 68, 69, 70, 72, 74, 77, 78, Ackerman, Atwood, Dobbs, Donison, Lowenfield, Lyons, Tighe, Uchoa	Cuba	
81	Charlie Camlin (b. 1964)	21 March 2024	Beach, 63, 70, 71, 72, 74, 77, 78, 79, 80, Ackerman, Allen, Donison	Mid-America	
82	Jason Grote	4 June 2025	63, Wood, 74, 77, 78, 79, 80, 81, Ackerman, Allen, Breedlove, Bryan, Guernsey	Central States	
83	Matthew Firth	26 July 2025	67, 69, 80, Fenwick, Sathiyakumar	Northern Diocese (UK)	
84	Mark Gretason	26 July 2025	67, 69, 80, Fenwick, Sathiyakumar	Southern Diocese (UK)	

== See also ==
- List of bishops of the Anglican Church in North America
