= Ted Follows (bishop) =

Canadian Anglican bishop

The Right Reverend Ted Follows
- Bishop of Western Canada and Alaska
- Church: Reformed Episcopal Church
- Diocese: Western Canada and Alaska
- In office: 1993–1996 (Western Canada and Alaska)
- Successor: Charles Dorrington
- Other posts: Rector, Church of Our Lord

Orders
- Consecration: September 12, 1993 by Wilbur Lyle

Personal details
- Born: June 8, 1926
- Died: September 1, 2013 (aged 87)

Edward Arthur "Ted" Follows (June 8, 1926 – September 1, 2013) was a Canadian Anglican bishop and pastor in the Reformed Episcopal Church (REC). From 1993 to 1996, he was bishop ordinary of the Diocese of Western Canada and Alaska.

== Biography ==
The Reformed Episcopal Church had dwindled in Canada to just three parishes, including the historic Church of Our Lord founded by Edward Cridge, when it was decided to create two dioceses and pursue reunification with the U.S. branch of the REC. Follows was elected bishop of the newly formed Diocese of Western Canada and Alaska. On September 13, 1993, he was consecrated by the Rt. Rev. Wilbur Lyle, the Rt. Rev. Royal U. Grote Jr., the Rt. Rev. Robert H. Booth, and newly consecrated REC Bishop of Eastern Canada Michael Fedechko.

Follows served concurrently as rector of Church of Our Lord. In 1994, the Reformed Episcopal Church of Canada merged into the Reformed Episcopal Church. In 1996, Follows stepped down to focus on his work as rector of Church of Our Lord and principal of Cridge Memorial Theological College and was succeeded by Charles Dorrington.

Follows was married to Betty and had three children. He died on September 13, 2013, in Sidney, Vancouver Island.
