= Living Word Reformed Episcopal Church =

- Living Word Reformed Episcopal Church
- 49.71047°N 124.99248°W
- Location: 4778 North Island Highway, Courtenay, British Columbia, V9N 5Y7, Canada
- Denomination: Anglican Church in North America; Reformed Episcopal Church
- Website: livingwordrec.ca

History
- Former name(s): St. Andrew's Presbyterian Church, Sandwick

Architecture
- Style: Vernacular
- Years built: 1877

Administration
- Diocese: Mid-America

Clergy
- Rector: The Rev. William Klock

Living Word Reformed Episcopal Church (formerly known as St. Andrew's Presbyterian Church, Sandwick) is a historic Anglican and Presbyterian church near Courtenay, British Columbia, in the Comox Valley region of Vancouver Island. Built in 1877 and one of the oldest surviving structures in Courtenay, the church has been listed since 2009 on the City of Courtenay Heritage Register.

== History ==
The church was built in 1877 by pioneer settlers on Mission Hill; the settlers came from New Brunswick and were Presbyterians of Scottish descent. Logs were harvested on the beach and milled locally into lumber. The frame was raised during a work bee. The church was built at the same time as St. Andrew's Anglican Church in Courtenay, after the Presbyterians and Anglicans had shared a log church for the previous decade.

As the Comox Valley grew, new Presbyterian churches were established out of St. Andrew's. The Bay Church was built in Comox in 1901 and St. George's Presbyterian Church was built in Courtenay in 1913. After the formation of the United Church of Canada in 1925, all three churches became points of the same charge. After declining attendance, the St. Andrew's congregation was amalgamated with the Comox church in 1961 and the Mission Hill church was disused.

In 2001, Living Word Church was begun as an independent, lay-led congregation meeting in the historic church. In 2002, the congregation was received into the Reformed Episcopal Church's Diocese of Western Canada and Alaska and the Rev. Bill Hedges was ordained to serve as Living Word's first minister.

== Architecture ==
Designed in a vernacular style, the church building is a simple, one-and-a-half-storey rectangular structure with a gabled roof. It remains situated on its original site surrounded by a grove of mature Garry oaks and a historic cemetery. The exterior is sided with shiplap and the roof is made of hand-split cedar shingles. The interior floors were made of spruce. The original hand-built pews are still in use in the church.

== See also ==
- List of historic places in the Comox Valley Regional District
