= James Renney =

British bishop

James Renny, D.D. (died 26 July 1894) was a bishop of the Reformed Episcopal Church in England. He was consecrated as bishop for the Free Church of England on 24 June 1892 at Emmanuel Church, Gunnersbury, London.

== See also ==
- List of bishops of the Reformed Episcopal Church
