= Edward Follows =

Edward Follows may refer to:

- Edward J. "Ted" Follows (1926–2016), Canadian film, television and stage actor
- Edward A. "Ted" Follows (1926–2013), Canadian bishop of the Reformed Episcopal Church
