= John Sugden =

British bishop

John Sugden (1820 – 20 June 1897) was a bishop of the Free Church of England. He was consecrated by Edward Cridge and others on 20 August 1876 in Christ Church, Lambeth.

== See also ==
- List of bishops of the Reformed Episcopal Church
