= Bishop Cummins Reformed Episcopal Church =

Anglican church in Maryland, United States

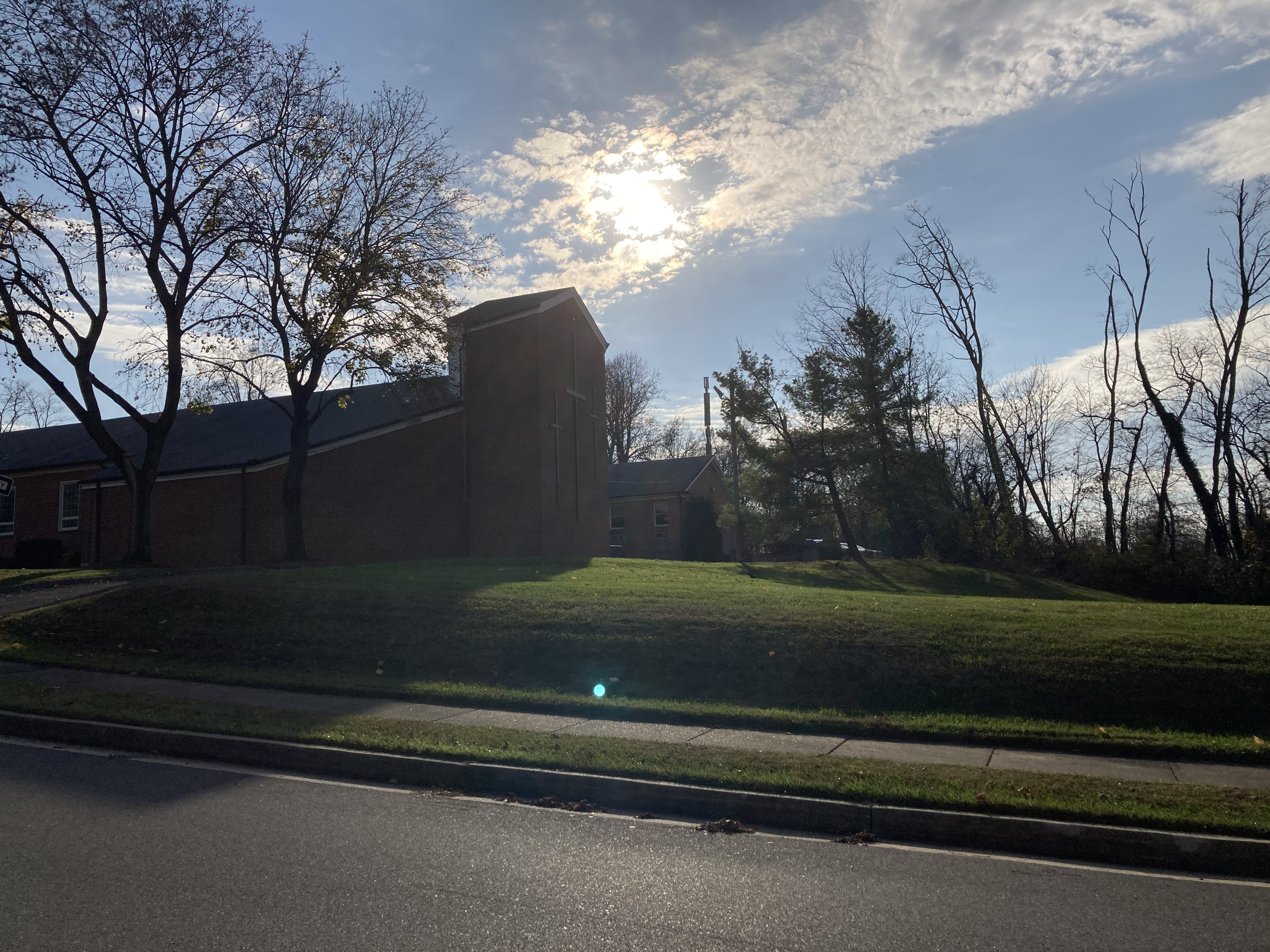
- Bishop Cummins Reformed Episcopal Church
- 39.26616°N 76.76126°W
- Location: Catonsville, Maryland
- Country: United States
- Denomination: Anglican Church in North America; Reformed Episcopal Church
- Website: www.bishopcummins.org

History
- Founded: 1874
- Dedicated: 1961

Administration
- Diocese: Northeast and Mid-Atlantic

Clergy
- Rector: The Rev. Cedric Benner
- Cummins Memorial Church
- U.S. National Register of Historic Places
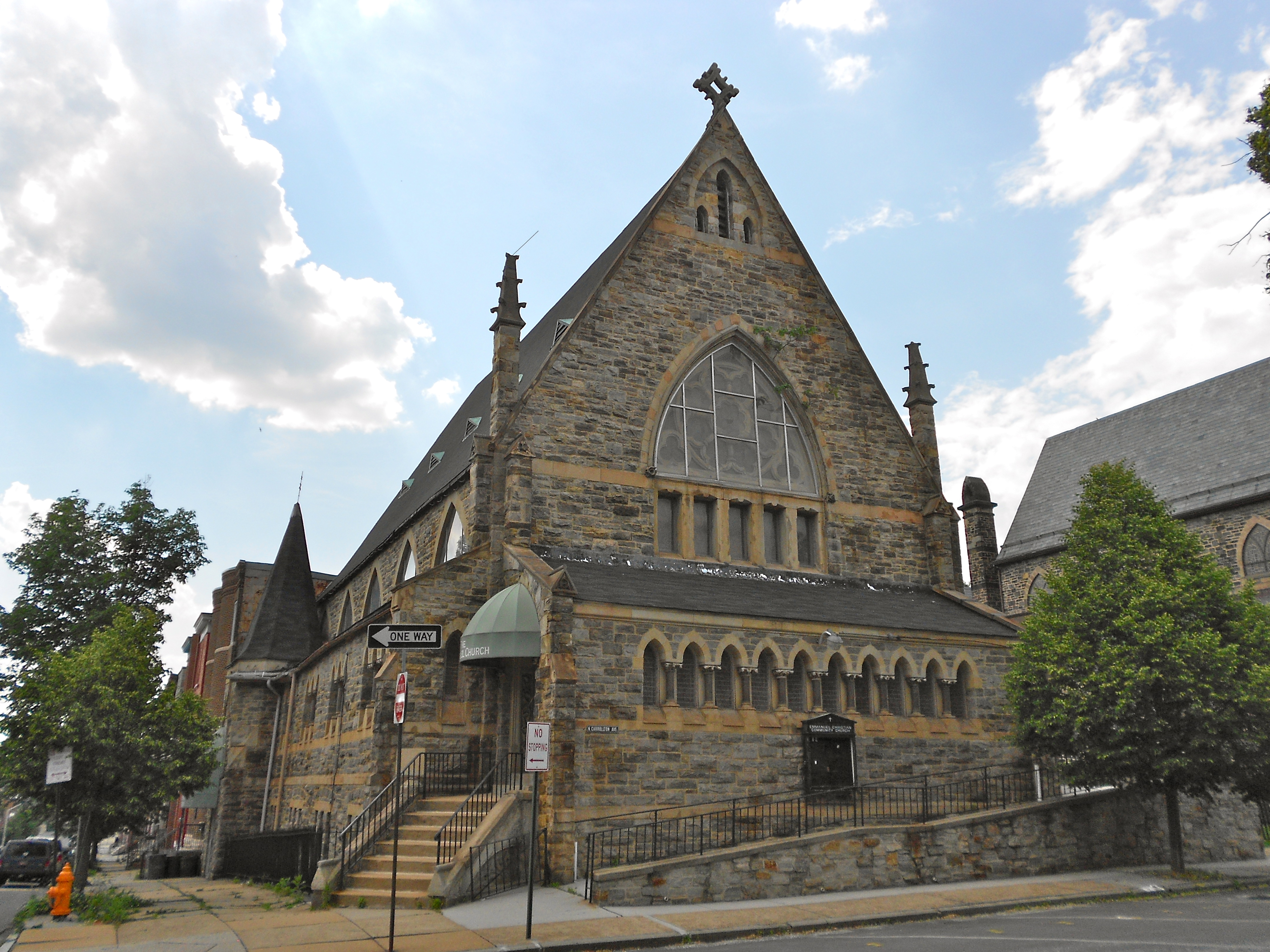
- Emmanuel Church, May 2013

- Location within Baltimore Location within Maryland Location within the United States
- Location: 1210 W. Lanvale St., Baltimore, Maryland
- Coordinates: 39°17′53″N 76°38′17″W
- Area: 0.1 acres (0.040 ha)
- Built: 1878
- Architect: J. Appleton Wilson
- Architectural style: Gothic Revival
- NRHP reference No.: 79003215
- Added to NRHP: October 31, 1979

Bishop Cummins Reformed Episcopal Church is a Reformed Episcopal Church congregation in Catonsville, Maryland. Founded in 1874, the building it occupied in Baltimore from 1879 to 1961 is listed on the National Register of Historic Places under the name Cummins Memorial Church.

== History of the church ==
Bishop Cummins REC is one of the oldest congregations in the Reformed Episcopal Church, which was founded by George David Cummins in December 1873. Cummins toured the northeast, establishing churches in New York, Montreal, Chicago, Philadelphia and Ottawa before returning to Baltimore. In 1874, he led a group in holding services under the name Church of the Rock of Ages. The church incorporated in 1877 and began construction on a Gothic Revival church on Lafayette Square in 1878. Cummins died later that year, and the church was renamed in his honor.

In 1961, under the leadership of the Rev. Daniel G. Cox and with the support of longtime member and vestryman and future Maryland Gov. William Donald Schaefer, the church relocated to the suburban community of Catonsville. Its name was changed to the present name in 2007.

Other notable parishioners in the mid-20th century included disability advocate Joni Eareckson, who was confirmed at Bishop Cummins prior to the diving accident that left her paralyzed, and Edward and Joyce Brumbaugh, whose daughter Gayle married Michael Ford, son of then-Vice President Gerald Ford, in 1973. Cox officiated the ceremony at a different Catonsville church due to construction at Bishop Cummins.

Bishop Cummins REC has also played a role in diocesan events as the site of episcopal consecrations of Cox in 1984 and of Bill Jenkins in 2023 as bishop coadjutor of the Diocese of the Northeast and Mid-Atlantic.

== Architecture ==
=== Exterior ===
The historic building is located at 1210 West Lanvale Street in Baltimore at the corner of Carrollton Avenue. It is a Gothic Revival-style church executed in granite ashlar. It features a high-pitched gable roof; a short, two-staged tower in the southwest corner with a slate-shingled, hexagonal roof; and a large stained glass, lancet window with wood tracery.

A decorative cross sits atop the apex of the gable. Each side of the church has narrow aisles above which is on each side a clerestory of five stained glass lancet-arched windows. The Carrollton Avenue east end facade is fronted by a one-story, shed-roofed narthex arcade with lancet-arched portals at either end. The west end of the church adjoins a rowhouse rectory.

=== Interior ===
The entrance of the church is on the east end though the narthex, with the pulpit and choir at the west end of the church. The church includes a U-shaped balcony along the south, east, and north walls. The interior roof is gambrel-shaped and supported by eight decorative brackets.

== Preservation ==
Cummins Memorial Church was listed on the National Register of Historic Places in 1979. It was described in its nomination as "significant 1) as Baltimore's first Reformed Episcopal congregation, 2) as an elegant contribution to the Gothic Revival in mid-19th century American architecture, and 3) as an integral element of one of Baltimore's finest urban parks, Lafayette Square."

After Bishop Cummins relocated, the building was occupied by Emmanuel Christian Community Church and Greater Hope Church of God in Christ; it was sold in 2022 to an undisclosed buyer.
