= Diocese of Cuba =

Diocese of Cuba may refer to:

- Episcopal Church of Cuba, a diocese of the Episcopal Church
- Missionary Diocese of Cuba, a diocese of the Reformed Episcopal Church in the Anglican Church in North America
