= Chuck Gillin =

American Anglican bishop

The Right Reverend R. Charles "Chuck" Gillin
- Bishop of the Northeast and Mid-Atlantic
- Church: Anglican Church in North America; Reformed Episcopal Church
- Diocese: REC Northeast and Mid-Atlantic
- In office: 2019–2025
- Predecessor: David L. Hicks
- Successor: William A. Jenkins Sr.

Orders
- Consecration: September 29, 2012 by Leonard W. Riches

Personal details
- Born: 1951 (age 74–75) Philadelphia

Raymond Charles Gillin (born 1951) is an American Anglican bishop. He was the 12th bishop ordinary of the Reformed Episcopal Church's Diocese of the Northeast and Mid-Atlantic (NEMA).

== Biography ==
Gillin was born in Philadelphia and raised in Delaware County, Pennsylvania. He graduated from Susquehanna University and received an M.Div. from Reformed Episcopal Seminary.

He served for 24 years as rector of Grace Reformed Episcopal Church in Collingdale, Pennsylvania, as well as interim rector of St. Mark’s Reformed Episcopal Church in Rydal, Pennsylvania. Gillin was canon to the ordinary under NEMA bishops Leonard W. Riches and David L. Hicks.

On September 29, 2012, Gillin was consecrated as NEMA's bishop suffragan at the Reformed Episcopal Church of the Atonement in Philadelphia by REC Presiding Bishop Riches. Co-consecrators were Hicks, Royal U. Grote Jr., Daniel Morse and Richard Lipka. In 2019, upon Hicks' retirement, Gillin was elected to succeed him as bishop ordinary.

In 2022, Gillin announced that he would retire by 2025. The diocese called for the election of a bishop coadjutor, and in November 2022, William A. Jenkins Sr. was elected. Jenkins succeeded Gillin as bishop ordinary on January 2, 2025.

== Personal life ==
Gillin is married to Jan, and they live in Marlton, New Jersey. The Gillins have two adult children and four grandchildren.

Anglican Communion titles
| Preceded by David L. Hicks | XII REC Bishop of the Northeast and Mid-Atlantic; 2019–2025 | Succeeded by William A. Jenkins Sr. |
