= List of historic places in the Comox Valley Regional District =

The following list includes all of the Canadian Register of Historic Places listings in Comox Valley Regional District, British Columbia.

Name	Address	Coordinates	Government recognition (CRHP №)	Wikidata ID	Image
Billy Booth House	307 First Street; Courtenay BC	49°41′38″N 125°00′07″W	Courtenay municipality (14479)		
Comox Valley Exhibition Grounds	4835 Headquarters Road; Courtenay BC	49°42′24″N 125°00′25″W	Courtenay municipality (14481)		Upload Photo
Courtenay and District Museum	207 Fourth Street; Courtenay BC	49°41′33″N 124°59′53″W	Courtenay municipality (14465)		
Courtenay Public Library	300 Sixth Street; Courtenay BC	49°41′23″N 124°59′53″W	Courtenay municipality (14483)		Upload Photo
Courtenay River	Courtenay BC	49°41′09″N 124°59′10″W	Courtenay municipality (14525)		
Courtenay Riverway	Courtenay BC	49°40′51″N 124°59′02″W	Courtenay municipality (14524)		
Creech House	443 Fourth Street; Courtenay BC	49°41′29″N 125°00′07″W	Courtenay municipality (14477)		
Fifth Street	Fifth Street; Courtenay BC	49°41′16″N 125°00′18″W	Courtenay municipality (14526)		
Former Canadian Pacific Railway Station (Via Rail)	899 Cumberland Road; Courtenay BC	49°41′02″N 125°00′07″W	Federal (4587)		More images
Lewis Park	489 North Island Highway; Courtenay BC	49°41′40″N 124°59′38″W	Courtenay municipality (14469)		
Native Sons Hall	360 Cliffe Avenue; Courtenay BC	49°41′34″N 124°59′53″W	Courtenay municipality (14464)		
Old Church Theatre	755 Harmston Avenue; Courtenay BC	49°41′13″N 125°00′07″W	Courtenay municipality (14482)		
Old House Restaurant	1760 Riverside Lane; Courtenay BC	49°41′04″N 124°59′17″W	Courtenay municipality (14473)		
St. Andrew's Presbyterian Church, Sandwick	4778 North Island Highway; Courtenay BC	49°42′38″N 124°59′31″W	Courtenay municipality (14466)		Upload Photo
St. Andrews Anglican Church	4634 North Island Highway; Courtenay BC	49°42′12″N 124°59′24″W	Courtenay municipality (14467)		Upload Photo
Sandwick Manor	276 Sandwick Road; Courtenay BC	49°42′00″N 124°59′17″W	Courtenay municipality (14468)		Upload Photo
Scoop Johnson House	754 Stewart Avenue; Courtenay BC	49°41′03″N 125°00′29″W	Courtenay municipality (14478)		Upload Photo
Seale and Thomson Garage	409 Cliffe Avenue; Courtenay BC	49°41′32″N 124°59′53″W	Courtenay municipality (14472)		
Settlers' Cairn	Headquarters Road; Courtenay BC	49°42′06″N 124°59′35″W	Courtenay municipality (14471)		Upload Photo
Simms Millennium Park	50 Old Island Highway; Courtenay BC	49°41′31″N 124°59′35″W	Courtenay municipality (14470)		
Tsolum River Garry Oak Ecosystem	Courtenay BC	49°42′32″N 124°59′38″W	Courtenay municipality (14527)		Upload Photo
Tribune Bay Lodge	Hornby Island BC	49°31′48″N 124°37′59″W	British Columbia (18066)		Upload Photo
