= Willians Mendez Suarez =

Cuban Anglican bishop

The Right Reverend Willians Mendez Suarez
- Bishop Suffragan of the Missionary Diocese of Cuba
- Church: Reformed Episcopal Church
- Diocese: Cuba
- In office: 2014–2023
- Successor: John Boonzaaijer

Orders
- Consecration: May 24, 2014 by Charles Dorrington

Personal details
- Born: 1951 (age 74–75)

Raul Willians Mendez Suarez (born 1951) is a Cuban Anglican bishop. He served from 2014 to 2023 as bishop suffragan of the Missionary Diocese of Cuba in the Reformed Episcopal Church.

== Ministry career ==
Mendez began his ministry career as a Baptist pastor and joined the REC in 2008. He became pastor of the original Cuban REC church plant, Iglesia de San Marcos in Moa, in 2009. In 2012, he became archdeacon for the growing missionary district, which was founded as a mission outreach of the REC Diocese of Western Canada and Alaska in 2003 and expanded by 2020 to more than 40 locations with an average Sunday attendance of 1,000.

Mendez was consecrated as bishop suffragan for the Missionary District of Cuba in Holguin on May 24, 2014. Charles Dorrington was the chief consecrator, joined by Bishops Trevor Walters of the Anglican Network in Canada and Miguel Uchôa of the Anglican Diocese of Recife. Mendez has worked to develop an REC seminary program in Moa.

With the merger of the Diocese of Western Canada and Alaska into the Diocese of Mid-America by the time of the REC's 2017 triennial General Council, the missionary district of Cuba became a missionary diocese under the leadership of Dorrington, assisted by Mendez.

Mendez retired in late 2023, and the Rev. John Boonzaaijer was elected to take his place as bishop suffragan for the missionary diocese.

== Personal life ==
Mendez was married to Reina Acosta Real until her death in 2022.
