= John Boonzaaijer =

American Anglican bishop (born 1968)

The Right Reverend John Boonzaaijer
- Suffragan Bishop of Cuba
- Church: Anglican Church in North America; Reformed Episcopal Church
- Diocese: Cuba
- In office: 2024–present
- Predecessor: Willians Mendez Suarez
- Other post(s): Rector, Chapel of the Cross (2007–present); President, REC Board of Foreign Missions (2020–present)
- Previous post(s): REC Canon for Foreign Missions (2020–2024)

Orders
- Consecration: February 15, 2024 by Ray Sutton

Personal details
- Born: 1968 (age 56–57); Kalamazoo, Michigan, U.S.

John Peter Boonzaaijer (Dutch pronunciation: [ˈboːnˌzaːi.ər]; born 1968) is an American Anglican bishop. He serves as president of the Reformed Episcopal Church's Board of Foreign Missions and as suffragan bishop for the REC's Missionary Diocese of Cuba.

== Early life and education ==
Boonzaaijer was born in Kalamazoo, Michigan, as one of nine children of Dutch immigrant parents in a bilingual household. His family ran Boonzaaijer's Bakery in Kalamazoo and Boonzaaijer worked in the bakery as a young person.

Boonzaaijer graduated from Kalamazoo's Christian Reformed school system and enrolled in Western Michigan University in 1986. After discerning a call to pastoral ministry, he transferred to Toronto Baptist Seminary and Bible College, where he earned a B.Th. in 1991. In 1994, after completing a curacy and spending a year as a cross-country truck driver, Boonzaaijer began his first pastorate in Sand Springs, Oklahoma. That year he married his wife, Christine; the Boonzaaijers have five adult children.

== Reformed Episcopal Church ==
Boonzaaijer entered the Reformed Episcopal Church in 2002, serving as a teacher and assistant rector of Good Shepherd REC in Tyler, Texas, under Walter Banek. He completed his M.Div. from Cummins Seminary in 2004. In 2007, Boonzaaijer was called as rector of Chapel of the Cross in Dallas, where he founded and served as head of school of the St. Timothy School, a K-12 classical Christian school. Boonzaaijer also completed a Th.M. at Cranmer Theological House in 2009 and is a doctoral candidate at Nashotah House. At the invitation of Chapel of the Cross member Michael C. Burgess, Boonzaaijer was guest chaplain in the U.S. House of Representatives on June 20, 2014. He also served as president of the Anglican School Association and on the catechism task force for the Anglican Church in North America.

Boonzaaijer became involved in foreign missions around 2014. Starting in 2020, Boonzaaijer was elected president of the REC's Board of Foreign Missions, partnering with REC missionary and church planting efforts in Croatia, Cuba, Germany, Malawi and elsewhere. Presiding Bishop Ray Sutton also named Boonzaaijer as his canon for foreign missions.

Determining a need for more oversight of the Missionary Diocese of Cuba, Sutton and the REC bishops in 2023 elected Boonzaaijer to serve as a suffragan bishop for the diocese. Boonzaaijer will continue to serve as president of the BFM and rector of Chapel of the Cross. While not required by REC canons, Boonzaaijer's election was consented by the Anglican Church in North America College of Bishops, allowing him to sit in the ACNA college. He was consecrated as a bishop on February 15, 2024, at the Cathedral Church of the Holy Communion in Dallas.
