= Independent Anglican Church Canada Synod =

The Independent Anglican Church (Canada Synod) (IACCS) is an Anglican jurisdiction with a presence in Canada and the United States of America. The Most Rev. Peter Wayne Goodrich of Niagara Falls, Ontario is its Primate. There are several suffragan bishops. The church is not affiliated with the Anglican Communion headed by the Archbishop of Canterbury.

== History ==
The IACCS was legally constituted as the "Independent Catholic Church of Canada" by Letters Patent in 1978, by Peter Goodrich, then Archbishop of the Liberal Catholic Church. In 1978, the Ottawa Journal reported Goodrich's consecration as Primate of the Liberal Catholic Church: "Most Rev. Peter Goodrich, Archbishop of Ontario, was elected primate of the Canadian Liberal Catholic Church International at the Canadian synod". Subsequently, Goodrich established the "Independent Catholic Church of Canada" which was legally renamed "Independent Anglican Church (Canada Synod)" in Supplementary Letters Patent in 1988.

This church has merged with a series of other Anglican bodies in the United States over the past half-century. None of these arrangements lasted more than a few years, after each of which the IACCS returned to its earlier status.

In 2006, the Anglican Independent Communion in the Americas, led by the Rt. Rev. John W. Gains of Georgetown, Delaware, merged with the IACCS to become the "Anglican Church, Province of North America, Inc." The union was dissolved in 2008. Bishop Gains and his parish later joined the IACCS as did Bishop Michael Fedechko, formerly Bishop Primus of the Reformed Episcopal Church of Canada, along with his parish in New Liskeard, Ontario.

== Doctrinal orientation ==
The IACCS describes itself as conservative, having retained the use of the historic Book of Common Prayer, the Book of Common Praise 1938, and Anglican Chant for the Psalms and Canticles. The IACCS utilizes its own revision of the 1549 prayer book, the Book of Common Prayer Canada, 1991. It requires that all clergy subscribe to the Thirty-Nine Articles of Religion. The church permits the ordination of both men and women as deacons, believing this to be consistent with the writings of St. Paul (Romans 16:1). The IACCS allows members to hold various views on the question of ordaining women to the priesthood; however, in practice ordination to priesthood and episcopate are reserved to men.

Two service books have been published for use by IACCS congregations: the Book of Common Prayer, 1991 Canada, and The Psalter, Psalms and Canticles Pointed and Set to Anglican Chants, were both published in 1991. A companion Holy Week and Other Services book was published by the church in fall 2000. An Anglican Book of Occasional Services was scheduled for publication early in 2012.

The discipline and public worship of the church is described as ranging from Anglo-Catholic to (Low) Evangelical. Most congregations are said to be in between the two.

== Institutions ==
The Diocesan Library houses approximately 4,000 volumes. This collection features books and information about virtually every religion, having been collected over the past forty years by Archbishop Goodrich. The library is available for students of St. Matthew’s Cathedral College and other students of religion.

== Relations with other churches ==
The IACCS is not in communion with any other independent Anglicans. It considers itself to be unilaterally in communion with any Anglican jurisdiction that has "a valid Apostolic Succession and maintains the Anglican Tradition of Common Prayer worship".

The stated policy of the IACCS is not to encourage members, either clergy or lay, of the Anglican Church of Canada to leave the Anglican Communion. The intention of the IACCS is to be available for those who, for whatever reasons, have already left the Anglican Church of Canada or any other church within the Anglican Communion.

The church is in intercommunion with the Christian Catholic Church of Canada.

== Parishes ==
=== Canada ===
- Hamilton, Ontario: St. Mary the Virgin
- Hamilton, Ontario: St. Mark the Evangelist
- Ottawa, Ontario: St. Francis of the Street (Outreach)

=== United States ===
- Watertown, New York: Anglican Church of Christ the King
- Georgetown, Delaware: St. James
- Homestead, Florida: St. Catherine
- St. Louis, Missouri: St. Daniel the Stylite

=== Mozambique ===
- Lichinga: All Saints, plus four additional missions

Several small religious orders and chaplains are affiliated with the Independent Anglican Church (Canada Synod).
