= Charles Dorrington =

Canadian Anglican bishop and musician

The Right Reverend Charles Dorrington D.D.
- Bishop of Western Canada and Alaska; Missionary Bishop of Cuba
- Church: Reformed Episcopal Church
- Diocese: Western Canada and Alaska, Cuba
- In office: 1996–2016 (Western Canada and Alaska); 2003–present (Cuba)
- Predecessor: E. A. "Ted" Follows
- Other posts: Assisting Bishop, Diocese of Mid-America; Rector, Church of Our Lord (1979–1992)

Orders
- Ordination: 1978 (diaconate); 1979 (presbyterate)
- Consecration: June 23, 1996 by Leonard W. Riches

Personal details
- Born: 1940 (age 85–86)
- Spouse: Claudia Alley

Charles William Dorrington (born 1940) is a retired Canadian Anglican bishop and church musician of the Reformed Episcopal Church (REC). From 1996 to 2016, he was bishop ordinary of the Diocese of Western Canada and Alaska. He also initiated and oversaw the REC's work in Cuba, which led to the formation of the Missionary Diocese of Cuba.

== Early life ==
Dorrington was born in 1940 and was baptized and confirmed in the Anglican Church of Canada, where he served as a choirboy, studying voice at the Toronto Conservatory of Music. In 1957 he graduated from Peterborough Collegiate and became a legal draftsman in Peterborough. In addition to his draftsmanship career, Dorrington soon began a vocation in lay ministry as a lay reader in the Diocese of Toronto and assistant choirmaster at All Saints Church, Peterborough. In 1970, he became president of the Coventry Singers and then choirmaster at St. Luke's Church in Peterborough.

Dorrington soon after moved to Victoria, where he worked as an engineering draftsman and a salesman for Sun Life Financial. He joined the Church of Our Lord in 1972 and in 1973 married Claudia Alley. In his musical career, he was president of the Amity Singers in Victoria, performed with the Opera Department of the Victoria Conservatory and in 1975 founded the Vancouver Island Opera Society. He also was director of music and a lay reader at the Church of Our Lord. In November 1978 he was ordained as a deacon in the Reformed Episcopal Church, becoming a curate in the parish. In July 1979, he was ordained a presbyter and appointed rector of Church of Our Lord.

== Ministry career ==
In 1982, Dorrington gave up his secular job at BC Hydro to focus full-time on ministry. He served as rector of the Church of Our Lord until 1992, when he and his wife shifted their focus to full-time counseling, founding Victoria Prayer Counselling. In January 1995, he returned to the Church of Our Lord as choirmaster. He later planted Church of the Holy Trinity in Colwood, British Columbia.

In 1996, the General Council of the Reformed Episcopal Church voted to invite the Reformed Episcopal Church of Canada back into its diocesan structure, creating the Diocese of Western Canada and Alaska to serve Alaska, Alberta, British Columbia, Saskatchewan, and the Yukon. Dorrington was elected bishop coadjutor of the diocese and consecrated on June 23, 1996, by Presiding Bishop Leonard W. Riches. Upon his consecration, he succeeded Ted Follows as bishop ordinary of western Canada and Follows focused on his service as rector of Church of Our Lord.

In 2003, a small church of about 15 people in Moa asked for episcopal oversight from the Reformed Episcopal Church. Oversight of churches in Cuba fell to Dorrington's Diocese of Western Canada and Alaska due to the lack of direct U.S.-Cuba relations and limitations on trade and travel. With the support of the REC and the Anglican Network in Canada, the church in Cuba began to grow. In 2014, Dorrington consecrated Willians Mendez Suarez—who had become pastor of the first REC Cuban church in 2009—as suffragan bishop of the missionary district.

With the merger of the Diocese of Western Canada and Alaska into the Diocese of Mid-America, effective in 2016, the missionary district of Cuba became a missionary diocese under the leadership of Dorrington, assisted by Mendez. By 2020, the missionary diocese had grown to more than 40 locations with an average Sunday attendance of 1,000. In retirement, Dorrington became an assisting bishop in the Diocese of Mid-America supporting congregations in western Canada.

== Personal life ==
Dorrington's wife, Claudia, is active in the Inner Healing Ministry in Victoria, as a prayer counselor with Victoria Prayer Counselling and as a board member of the Cridge Centre for the Family, British Columbia's oldest continuously operating nonprofit social services organization.

In 2008, Dorrington was awarded an honorary doctorate of divinity from Cranmer House.
