= Bill Jenkins (bishop) =

American Anglican bishop

The Right Reverend William A. Jenkins Sr.
- Bishop of the Northeast and Mid-Atlantic
- Church: Anglican Church in North America; Reformed Episcopal Church
- Diocese: REC Northeast and Mid-Atlantic
- In office: 2025–present
- Predecessor: Chuck Gillin

Orders
- Ordination: 1983 (diaconate); 1985 (presbyterate)
- Consecration: April 29, 2023 by Foley Beach, Ray Sutton

Personal details
- Born: 1963 (age 62–63) Havre de Grace, Maryland

William Alan Jenkins Sr. (born 1963) is an American Anglican bishop. He is currently the 13th bishop ordinary of the Reformed Episcopal Church's Diocese of the Northeast and Mid-Atlantic (NEMA). Prior to his election as coadjutor bishop, he was canon to the ordinary in the diocese.

== Early life, education, and family ==
Jenkins was born in Havre de Grace, Maryland, in 1963, and was raised in a congregation of the fundamentalist Evangelical Methodist Church of America. He received a bachelor's degree in religious education and pastoral studies from Manahath School of Theology, the denominational school in Hollidaysburg, Pennsylvania, and studied for a master's degree in religious education at Manahath. According to Jenkins, his thesis was rejected because he had moved away from the school's fundamentalist and premillennial theology. Before he could complete his degree, the institution closed and relocated to Virginia as Breckbill Bible College. Jenkins is pursuing continuing theological studies at Reformed Episcopal Seminary.

While studying at Manahath, he met his future wife, Kimberley. They married in August 1982 and have six biological children, 14 grandchildren and one great-grandchild. They also fostered five children.

== Ministry career ==
In 1983, Jenkins was ordained to the diaconate in the Methodist tradition, and in 1985 he was ordained as a presbyter. He served from 1985 to 1986 as the pastor of an Evangelical Methodist Church in Tennessee and from 1986 to 1988 as the pastor of a non-denominational Bible church in Cambridge, Maryland. Both charges ended unhappily, Jenkins has said, and he questioned the call to ordained ministry and worked in the business sector. He also moved away from Methodism to Reformed theology, serving in the Presbyterian Church in America briefly before being received into the Reformed Episcopal Church in 1990.

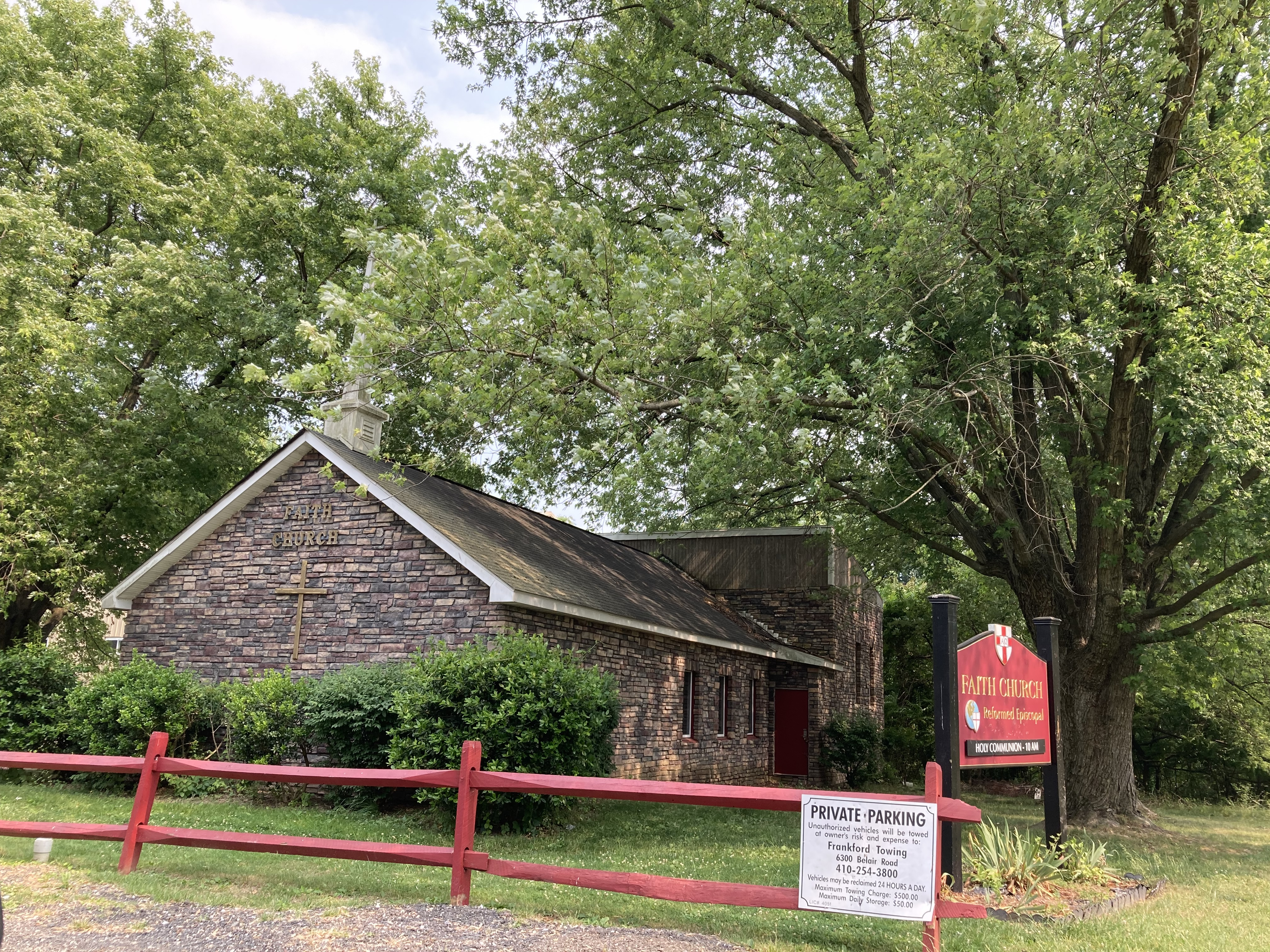
Faith REC in Armistead Gardens, Baltimore, which Jenkins has pastored since 1991.

Jenkins' first call in the REC was as rector of Emmanuel REC in Baltimore's Mayfield neighborhood. Less than a year later, he was asked to take over an additional role as rector of the struggling Faith REC in the nearby Armistead Gardens neighborhood. At the time, Faith's congregation had dwindled to 12 and Jenkins' original plan was to merge Faith with Emmanuel. Instead, Faith grew to self-sustaining size and Emmanuel was merged into it in 2006. Jenkins remains rector of Faith and has also held numerous diocesan roles, including canon to the ordinary starting in 2014 under Bishops David L. Hicks and Chuck Gillin.

On November 3, 2022, the NEMA synod elected Jenkins its next bishop coadjutor. ACNA consent was granted on January 11, 2023, and he was consecrated on April 29, 2023, at Bishop Cummins Reformed Episcopal Church. Jenkins succeeded Gillin as bishop ordinary on January 2, 2025.

== Financial writing ==
Jenkins was also a writer and editor for publications of Agora Financial, including serving from 2008 to 2010 as editor of Agora's FX Options Trading Masters product. During these years, he also wrote for Agora publications the Daily Reckoning and Money Morning.

Anglican Communion titles
Preceded by Chuck Gillin	XIII REC Bishop of the Northeast and Mid-Atlantic; Since 2025	Incumbent
