= Peter Fayssoux Stevens =

American soldier

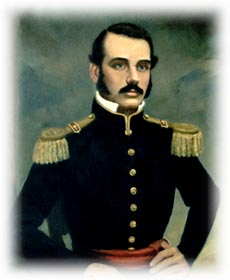
- Born: June 22, 1830; Leon County, Florida
- Died: January 9, 1910 (age 79); Charleston, South Carolina
- Burial place: Magnolia Cemetery
- Military career
- Allegiance: Confederate States of America
- Branch: Confederate States Army
- Service years: 1861–63
- Rank: Colonel
- Commands: Holcombe Legion
- Conflicts: American Civil War: Star of the West; First Battle of Rappahannock Station; Second Battle of Bull Run; Battle of South Mountain; Battle of Antietam
- Other work: Professor; College President; Episcopal Bishop

Peter Fayssoux Stevens (June 22, 1830 – January 9, 1910) was an American soldier, educator and clergyman. He was an officer in the Confederate States Army and a bishop in the Reformed Episcopal Church who also served as 4th superintendent of the South Carolina Military Academy (now The Citadel).

== Early years ==
Born near Tallahassee, Florida, but raised in Pendleton, South Carolina, he was First Honor Graduate in the Class of 1849 at the Citadel Academy in Charleston, one of the two schools that made up the South Carolina Military Academy (now The Citadel). In 1852, he was appointed a professor of mathematics at the Arsenal Academy in Columbia, the second SCMA campus. He returned to the Citadel Academy as a professor of belles lettres and French the next year; promoted to the rank of major in the South Carolina Militia, he became head of the department of engineering and astronomy. In 1859, he was elevated to superintendent of the South Carolina Military Academy.

== Civil War and later years ==
In January 1861, South Carolina Governor Francis Wilkinson Pickens ordered a detachment of SCMA cadets under the command of Stevens to man a battery of cannons on Morris Island, South Carolina with orders to fire on any vessel flying the American flag entering Charleston harbor; on January 9, the battery shelled the Union steamship Star of the West, which was attempting to resupply Fort Sumter, it is considered to be the first shots of the American Civil War. A man of deep religious faith, a short time later Stevens was ordained as a minister in the Protestant Episcopal Church. In October 1861, he resigned as SCMA Superintendent and was commissioned as a colonel in the Confederate States Army. He was directed by Governor Pickens to organize the Holcombe Legion which consisted of infantry and cavalry units which were assigned to the "Evans Brigade" in the Army of Northern Virginia with Stevens as its first commander. The unit helped defend Charleston in the summer of 1862 and also fought at the First Battle of Rappahannock Station, in the Second Battle of Bull Run, the Battle of South Mountain and the Battle of Antietam, where Stevens was wounded and after which time he decided to resign from the military and return to the ministry.

Stevens returned to the Diocese of the Southeast of the Protestant Episcopal Church and took up the cause of ministering to former slaves, known as Freedmen, he organized parishes in the Charleston area and founded the Bishop Cummins Training School in 1876 (now the Cummins Memorial Theological Seminary) as a seminary for blacks. It was named for George David Cummins, founder of the Reformed Episcopal Church which Stevens then was associated with. In 1879, he was named the church's first Bishop, the position he held for 30 years.

In 1877, Stevens spearheaded an effort to reopen the South Carolina Military Academy which had been closed and occupied by Union forces at the end of the Civil War, he called a meeting of graduates who drafted a resolution which was presented to the state legislature and the school resumed operations in 1882. An association of graduates was also formed, with Stevens as the first vice-president. In 1878, he was appointed school commissioner of Charleston County, South Carolina and became a professor of mathematics at all black Claflin College in Orangeburg, South Carolina (now Claflin University) in 1890.

== Personal life ==
Stevens' brother Clement H. Stevens (1821–1864) was a Confederate brigadier general and brigade commander in the Army of Tennessee who was fatally wounded at the Battle of Peachtree Creek near Atlanta. Brother Henry Kennedy Stevens (1821–1863) was commissioned into the United States Navy and later joined the Confederate States Navy serving as executive officer of the ironclad CSS Arkansas and while serving as commander of naval forces in Louisiana was killed in a battle with Union gunboats. In 1853 Stevens married Mary Singletary Capers (1833–1894), who was the sister of Ellison Capers a fellow SCMA graduate and professor who also later became Episcopal Bishop of South Carolina. In 1895, he married Harriet Rebecca Palmer (1842–1922) who survived him. Bishop Stevens died in Charleston in 1910 and was buried at the Magnolia Cemetery. He and his first wife had 6 children only one of whom survived him. Stevens Barracks on the campus of The Citadel was named in his honor.
