= Jasmin Milić =

Croatian Anglican bishop (born 1969)

The Right Reverend Jasmin Milić
- Assistant Bishop of the Protestant Reformed Christian Church in Croatia
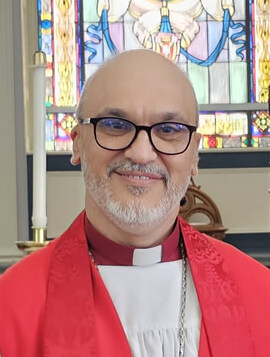
- Jasmin Milić c. 2023
- Church: Reformed Episcopal Church
- Diocese: Protestant Reformed Christian Church in Croatia
- In office: 2013–present

Orders
- Ordination: 1995
- Consecration: 3 May 2013 by Royal U. Grote Jr.

Personal details
- Born: December 28, 1969 (age 55); Bijeljina, Yugoslavia

Jasmin Milić (born 28 December 1969) is a Croatian Anglican bishop and theologian. Since 2013, he has been the first assistant bishop of the Protestant Reformed Christian Church in Croatia (PRKC), an overseas diocese of the Reformed Episcopal Church with congregations in Croatia and Serbia.

== Biography ==
Milić was born on 28 December 1969 in Bijeljina, Bosnia and Herzegovina, at the time in Yugoslavia. He studied theology at the Evangelical Theological Seminary in Osijek, Croatia; the Evangelical Bible Institute in Vienna; and the Protestant Theological Faculty in Novi Sad, Serbia, where he completed his Ph.D. in 2005 on the subject of Croatian Calvinism. He worked as a religious education teacher in public schools for more than 20 years and hosted a Christian radio program in Croatia called Sources of Faith. Milić also taught at the seminary in Osijek, where he was dean of external studies, and at the Novi Sad faculty, where he was academic dean.

Milić was ordained as a pastor in the Reformed Christian Calvinist Church in Croatia in 1995 and became a senior pastor of the Reformed church in Tordinci in 1999. In 2001, he joined other pastors and congregations in withdrawing from the church and forming the Protestant Reformed Christian Church in Croatia. Milić served as superintendent of the church. In 2010, he began the process of affiliating with the Reformed Episcopal Church, which was completed in 2011 when the PRKC was received as a deanery of the Reformed Episcopal Church in Germany.

The PRKC synod elected Milić as its local bishop, and he was consecrated at Tordinci by the Rt. Rev. Royal U. Grote Jr. on 3 May 2013. Milić continues to serve as assistant bishop under the presiding bishop of the REC, who is the ordinary of the PRKC ex officio.

In addition to his episcopal ministry, Milić is rector of the PRKC congregations in Tordinci and Osijek. He founded the Mihael Starin Protestant Theological School in Osijek. In 2017, to mark the 500th anniversary of the Protestant Reformation, he opened the Reformation Heritage Center in Osijek.

== Personal life ==
Milić is married to Tamara, and they have two children.

== Works ==
=== Books ===
- Milić, Jasmin (2002). Reformirana župa u Tordincima (in Croatian). Tordinci, Croatia: Protestantska reformirana crkvena općina Tordinci. ISBN 953-6865-06-8.
- Milić, Jasmin (2003). Tko je bio Jean Calvin (in Croatian). Tordinci, Croatia: Protestantska reformirana kršćanska crkva u RH. ISBN 953-6865-08-4.
- Milić, Jasmin (2003). Povijesno-pravni razvoj reformiranih crkvenih općina u Hrvatskoj (in Croatian). Osijek, Croatia: Kršćanski centar «Dobroga Pastira». ISBN 953-6865-11-4.
- Milić, Jasmin (2005). Protestantska reformirana kršćanska crkva u Republici Hrvatskoj: Prikaz ustrojstva, vjerovanja i djelovanja (in Croatian). Osijek, Croatia: Protestantska reformirana kršćanska crkva u Republici Hrvatskoj. ISBN 953-6865-12-2.
- Milić, Jasmin (2006). Kalvinizam u Hrvata s posebnim osvrtom na reformiranu župu Tordinci 1862–1918 (in Croatian). Tordinci, Croatia: Protestantska reformirana crkvena općina Tordinci. ISBN 953-6865-14-9.
- Milić, Jasmin (2006). Kalvinski Kanoni iz Kneževih Vinograda (in Croatian). Osijek, Croatia: Protestantska reformirana kršćanska crkva u RH. ISBN 953-6865-15-7.
- Milić, Jasmin (2007). Povijesni pregled liturgije s posebnim osvrtom na razvoj bogoslužja u protestantskim crkvama odnosno crkvama reformacijske baštine (in Croatian). Osijek, Croatia: Kršćanski centar «Dobroga Pastira». ISBN 978-953-6865-17-8.
- Milić, Jasmin (2008). Kalvinizam na optuženičkoj klupi (in Croatian). Tordinci, Croatia: Protestantska reformirana crkvena općina Tordinci. ISBN 978-953-6865-25-3.
- Milić, Jasmin (2008). Ljubav si ti (zbirka ljubavnih pjesama) (in Croatian). Osijek, Croatia: Kršćanski centar «Dobroga Pastira». ISBN 978-953-6865-26-0.
- Milić, Jasmin (2023). Blagoslovljeno kraljevstvo njegovo: Tumačenje euharistijskog bogoslužja prema Knjizi zajedničkih molitava (in Croatian). Osijek, Croatia: Kršćanski centar «Dobroga Pastira». ISBN 978-953-6865-35-2.
- Milić, Jasmin (2014). Povijest Reformirane crkve u Hrvatskoj (in Croatian). Osijek, Croatia: Protestantska reformirana kršćanska crkva u RH i Evanđeoski teološki fakultet. ISBN 978-953-6865-37-6.

=== Articles and chapters ===
- Milić, Jasmin (August 2003). "Vjerske zajednice i građansko-pravna osobnost". Hrvatska pravna revija (in Croatian): 13–19. ISSN 1332-8670.
- Milić, Jasmin (May 2004). "Posljedice pravomoćne sudske presude za treću osobu". Hrvatska pravna revija (in Croatian): 81–86. ISSN 1332-8670.
- Milić, Jasmin (June 2004). "The Development of the Reformed Church in Croatia". Frontier: 8–10. ISSN 0951-7677.
- Milić, Jasmin (February 2005). "Povijesni razvoj protestantizma s posebnim osvrtom na kalvinizam u Slavoniji". Život i škola (in Croatian): 46–60.
- Milić, Jasmin (2006). "Pravni položaj verskih zajednica na današnjem Hrvatskom prostoru u Habsburškoj odnosno Austro-ugarskoj monarhiji". Religija I Tolerancija (in Croatian): 21.
- Milić, Jasmin (2007). "Božićno vrijeme u protestantskoj liturgijskoj tradiciji". Teološki časopis (in Croatian): 141–155. ISSN 1451-0928.
- Milić, Jasmin (2007). "Nastanak i rani razvoj protestantizma". Povećalo, Beli Manastir (in Croatian). ISSN 1330-1667.
- Milić, Jasmin (March 2008). "Pravni i činjenični status vjerskih zajednica u Republici Hrvatskoj". Hrvatska pravna revija (in Croatian): 9–15. ISSN 1332-8670.
- Milić, Jasmin (2009). "Protestantizam u Baranji i istočnoj Slavoniji". In Kovač, Marina (ed.). Slavonija, Baranja i Srijem, vrela europske civilizacije (in Croatian). Zagreb: Galerija Klovićevi Dvori. ISBN 978-953-271-027-4.
- Milić, Jasmin (2009). "Najstarija hrvatska protestantska župa u Tordincima: prošlost i sadašnjost". In Marinović, Ankica; Markešić, Ivan (eds.). 500 godina protestantizma: baština i otisci u Hrvatskom društvu (in Croatian). Zagreb: Centar za demokraciju i pravo Miko Tripalo. ISBN 978-953-56875-9-7.
