= Michael Fedechko =

Canadian Anglican bishop

The Right Reverend Michael Fedechko
- Bishop of Central and Eastern Canada
- Church: Reformed Episcopal Church
- Diocese: Diocese of Central and Eastern Canada
- In office: 1993–2011

Orders
- Consecration: August 29, 1993 by Wilbur Lyle

Personal details
- Born: February 19, 1937 Myrnam, Alberta
- Died: September 6, 2019 (aged 82) Temiskaming Shores, Ontario

Michael Fedechko (February 19, 1937 – September 6, 2019) was a Canadian Anglican bishop and pastor in the Reformed Episcopal Church (REC). From 1993 to 2011, he was bishop ordinary of the Diocese of Central and Eastern Canada.

== Biography ==
Fedechko was born to Ukrainian immigrant parents in Myrnam, Alberta, and raised on a family farm. He served in the Canadian Armed Forces in the 1950s and then worked several jobs, including as a newspaper publisher and editor, a radio show host and hotel manager. He married Christine Robinson, and they had three daughters. Fedechko entered ordained ministry in the 1970s; he moved to Temiskaming Shores, Ontario, in 1980 and worked as a guidance counselor at the New Liskeard College of Agricultural Technology while serving bivocationally as rector of Trinity Reformed Episcopal Church in Haileybury.

The Reformed Episcopal Church had dwindled in Canada to just three parishes by the early 1990s, when it was decided to create two dioceses and pursue reunification with the U.S. branch of the REC. Fedechko was elected bishop of the newly formed Diocese of Central and Eastern Canada. On August 29, 1993, he was consecrated by Wilbur Lyle, Royal U. Grote Jr., Robert H. Booth, and Kenneth W. Powell.

In 2009, Fedechko retired as bishop, and the small Diocese of Central and Eastern Canada was brought under the oversight of the Diocese of the Northeast and Mid-Atlantic. However, in 2011, Fedechko and a small number of clergy and churches from the diocese left the REC and joined the Independent Anglican Church Canada Synod, a small continuing Anglican jurisdiction.

Fedechko died in 2019 in Temiskaming Shores.
