= Walter Banek =

American Anglican bishop

The Right Reverend Walter R. Banek
- Bishop Suffragan of Mid-America
- Church: Reformed Episcopal Church, Anglican Church in North America
- Diocese: Mid-America
- In office: 2017–present

Orders
- Ordination: 1989 (diaconate); 1993 (priesthood)
- Consecration: August 23, 2017 by Foley Beach

Personal details
- Born: 1952 (age 73–74) Chicago
- Spouse: Nelda Louise Hoyt
- Children: 7
- Education: Moody Bible Institute Cummins Theological Seminary

Walter Raymond Banek is an American Anglican bishop and classical Christian educator. He is currently serving as bishop suffragan in the Reformed Episcopal Church's Diocese of Mid-America and as rector of Good Shepherd Church in Tyler, Texas.

== Biography ==
Banek was raised in Chicago as the son of German immigrants. He studied architecture at the University of Illinois before transferring to Moody Bible Institute to finish his degree in 1975. That same year, he married Nelda Louise Hoyt, whom he had met at Moody. They have seven grown children (three adopted from Russia) and 20 grandchildren.

In 1981, Banek became headmaster of Good Shepherd School in Tyler, which had been founded two years prior, and developed its classical Christian curriculum and teaching model. In 1989, the school's sponsor, Good Shepherd Church, was constituted as a member of the Reformed Episcopal Church, and Banek was ordained a deacon in the REC. He was ordained as a priest in 1993, at which point he transitioned from headmaster to rector of the parish. Banek completed his M.Div. at Cummins Theological Seminary in 2000.

In 2017, Banek was elected bishop suffragan of the Diocese of Mid-America. He remained rector of Good Shepherd in addition to his episcopal duties. Anglican Church in North America Primate Foley Beach consecrated Banek on August 23, 2017, at the Cathedral Church of the Holy Communion in Dallas. He is a council member of Forward in Faith North America, which promotes Anglo-Catholic worship and opposes women's ordination.
