= Edward Cridge =

British-Canadian bishop and social reformer (1817–1913)

The Right Reverend Edward Cridge
- Bishop of the Reformed Episcopal Church in Canada
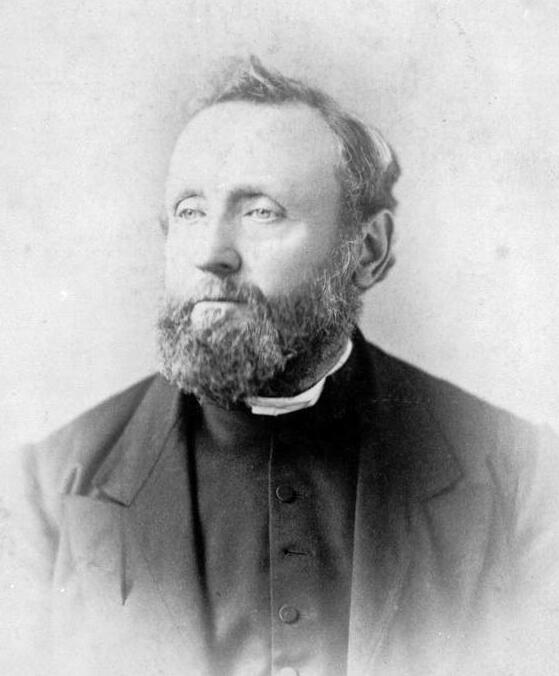
- Cridge in 1878
- Church: Reformed Episcopal Church
- In office: 1876–1895
- Other posts: Dean of Columbia (1865–1874); Rector of Church of Our Lord (1875–1895)

Orders
- Ordination: February 24, 1850 (priesthood) by Samuel Hinds
- Consecration: July 16, 1876 by Charles E. Cheney

Personal details
- Born: December 18, 1817 Bratton Fleming, Devon, UK
- Died: May 5, 1913 (aged 95) Victoria, British Columbia, Canada
- Spouse: Mary Winmill Cridge

Edward Cridge (December 17, 1817 – May 5, 1913) was a British-Canadian clergyman and social reformer. Born and raised in England and ordained in the Church of England, Cridge—a low church evangelical Anglican—disagreed with the then-ascendant high church movement in Anglicanism. Offered a new opportunity, he and his wife, Mary, migrated to the then-frontier outpost of Fort Victoria on Vancouver Island in 1855, where he was appointed to lead the congregation that eventually became known as Christ Church Cathedral. He also became a prominent advocate for the poor and underprivileged in the fast-growing city of Victoria. Cridge was the first superintendent of schools on Vancouver Island, and alongside Mary he was responsible for the creation of many of Victoria's nonprofit institutions. Among these organizations were the Protestant Orphans' Home (later renamed the Cridge Center for the Family, British Columbia's oldest continuously operating nonprofit organization) and the Royal Jubilee Hospital.

As an Anglican clergyman, Cridge was the first dean of the Diocese of British Columbia until 1874, when Bishop George Hills suspended his ministry in the Anglican church due to Cridge's vocal disagreement with Hills' views of ritualism. After his suspension and departure from the Anglican church, Cridge founded the Church of Our Lord in Victoria, after which became the first Canadian bishop of the newly formed Reformed Episcopal Church. Cridge was the rector of the Church of Our Lord until 1895 and remained active in Victoria's religious and civic affairs until his death in 1913.

== Early life and education ==
Cridge was born in 1817 in the Devonshire village of Bratton Fleming to John Cridge, a schoolmaster, and Grace Dyer Cridge. After working as a schoolmaster for some years, he entered Peterhouse, Cambridge, in his late 20s and studied for the clergy. He was ordained to the diaconate in 1848 and then as a priest in 1850, holding curacies at North Walsham, Norfolk, and then West Ham, where he met his future wife Mary Winmill.

During his West Ham curacy, the evangelical Cridge resisted the ascendant high church liturgy of the Oxford Movement, believing it hewed too close to Roman Catholicism. Some members of the West Ham church believed Cridge was promoting Calvinist doctrine and complained to the dean. The dean, himself an Anglo-Catholic, sought to solve the problem by recommending Cridge for a post as chaplain at Fort Victoria, the Hudson's Bay Company outpost on Vancouver Island. Cridge had already been corresponding with a fellow Cambridge alumnus who had held the post, and he became excited by the missionary opportunities the frontier station posed.

== Settlement in Canada ==
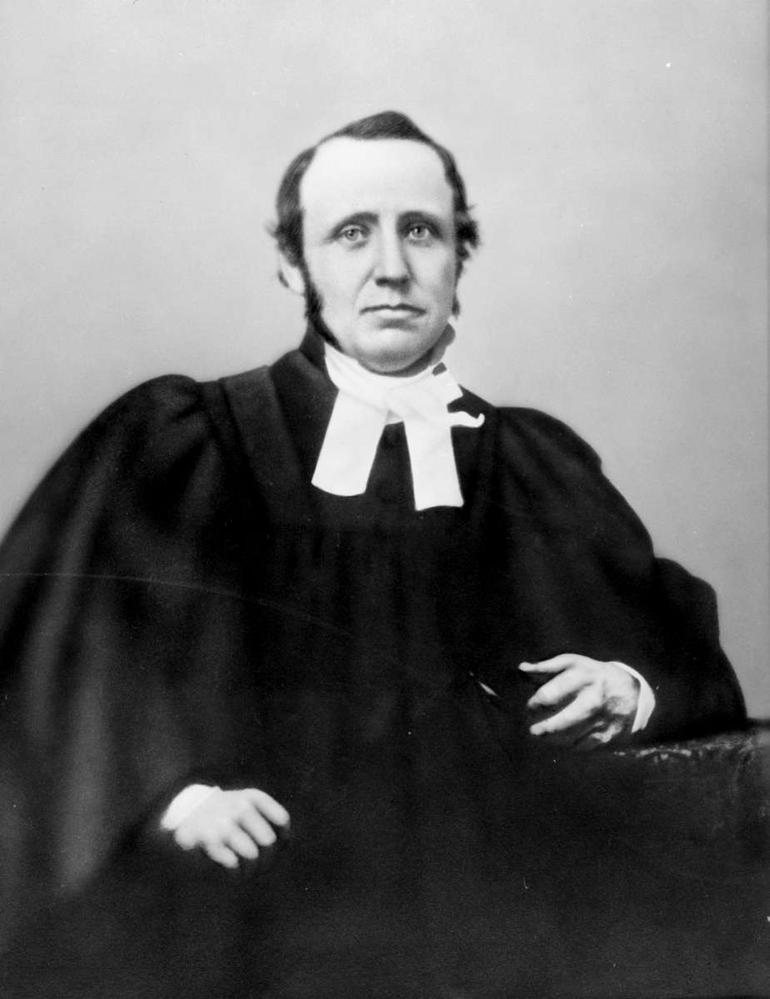
Cridge as a young clergyman

After a six-month journey on the Marquis of Bute via the Sandwich Islands, the Cridges arrived in Victoria on April 1, 1855. The role of chaplain also included teaching in the fort's private school and overseeing the common school in the town. Cridge's arrival coincided with the transition from HBC rule of Vancouver Island to the establishment of local authority. The longtime HBC factor, James Douglas, had also been governor of the Colony of Vancouver Island since 1851. In 1856, Douglas was forced to convene the first elected Legislative Assembly of Vancouver Island, presided over by his son-in-law John Sebastian Helmcken. Cridge offered the prayers at the assembly's inaugural formal opening in August 1856.

The assembly named Cridge the first superintendent of education for Vancouver Island, a position he held without pay for nearly a decade. He made extensive reports of inadequate conditions and poor attendance at the schools. By 1866, shortly after Cridge stepped down as superintendent, 500 students were enrolled in the Victoria, Nanaimo and Craigflower schools, as well as in new ones Cridge had established in Esquimalt, South Saanich, Cowichan and elsewhere on the island. Meanwhile, Cridge oversaw the completion of the HBC church, initially known as the Victoria District Church, in 1856. He renamed the congregation Christ Church. Starting in 1858, Douglas and Cridge encouraged the resettlement on Vancouver Island of Black people who were experiencing discrimination in California; Cridge welcomed the newcomers to worship at Christ Church, which was integrated racially, unlike the local congregational church. Unlike previous HBC chaplains, the Cridges were enthusiastic about life on the Pacific frontier and earned the respect of many throughout the colony.

== Social and civic activity ==
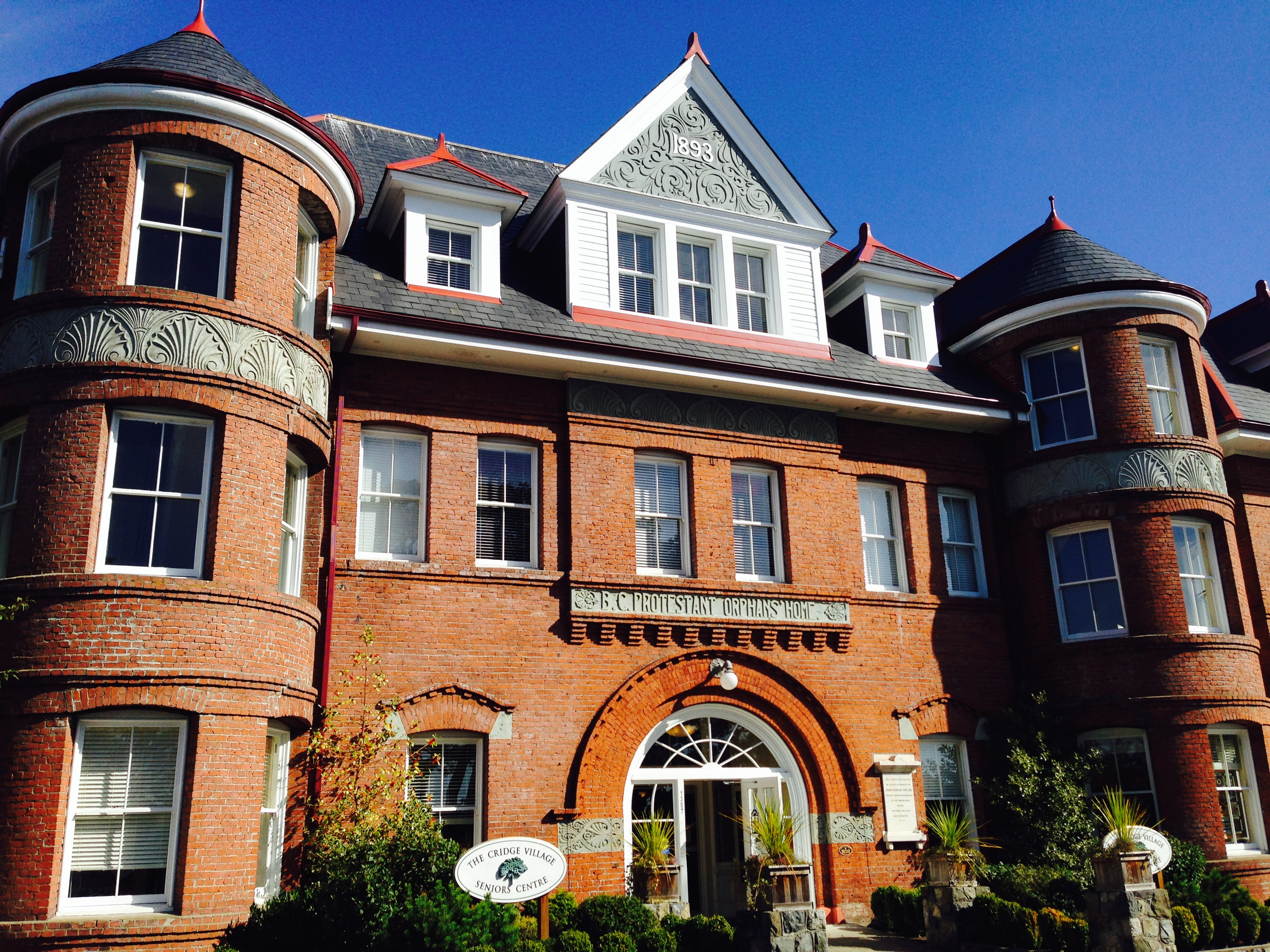
The B.C. Protestant Orphans' Home (1893), now the Cridge Center for the Family

Cridge was active in Victoria's civic and community affairs. In 1858, he helped spearhead the formation of the first hospital in Victoria, which was rebuilt in a new location in 1890 as the Royal Jubilee Hospital. He also advocated for better conditions in Victoria's jail and helped to found the local YWCA and Victoria Central High School.

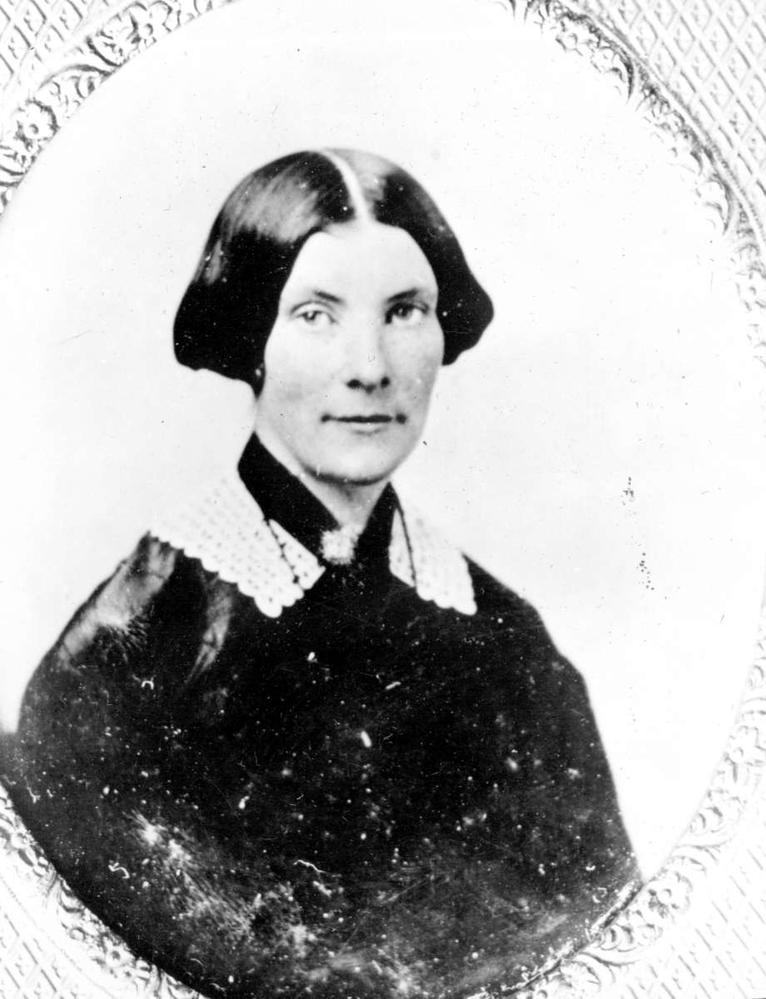
Mary Winmill Cridge c. 1880

The Cridges had nine children, although only four survived to adulthood. Of their five children who died young, four died over a two-month period during a black measles outbreak in the winter of 1864–1865. Meanwhile, the gold rushes in the Fraser Canyon and the Cariboo had brought a massive population influx to Victoria, including a growth in the orphan population. Mary Cridge brought several orphans to live in the Cridge family home over the years, until 1873, when she and Edward co-founded the B.C. Protestant Orphans' Home. The home's stated purpose was "to receive and to provide a Home for Orphan, destitute and other children, under the age of ten years, requiring such care; and to educate them in the protestant Faith, and instruct them in the elements of secular knowledge."

The first orphanage at Blanchard Street and Rae Street housed 21; this building was replaced in 1883. By 1891, the orphanage was again outgrowing its facilities. A bequest from John George Taylor enabled the construction of a larger brick Richardsonian Romanesque building at Hillside Avenue and Cook Street and the lifting of the age 10 cap on orphanage residents. The Cridges remained involved in the operation of the home well into the 20th century.

== Cridge-Hills controversy ==
Four years after Cridge arrived in Victoria, in 1859, the Diocese of British Columbia was formed from the Diocese of Rupert's Land that had covered all of Canada west of Ontario. English priest George Hills was made the first bishop and arrived in Victoria in January 1860. Cridge and Hills were wary of each other, with Cridge a low church evangelical and Hills somewhere between a "moderate high churchman" (according to Julie H. Ferguson) and an "ardent Tractarian" (according to Allen C. Guelzo). Hills immediately set up another congregation in Victoria and ordered a prefabricated iron frame structure for it, a decision that irked many of the local Anglicans who worried the town could not yet support two churches. However, despite their disagreements, Hills and Cridge were able to coexist since Hills was often absent from Victoria performing episcopal duties throughout his diocese and traveling back and forth to England to raise funds for the diocese.

In 1865, Hills designated Christ Church as the cathedral of the diocese, making Cridge the first dean of Columbia. However, according to Ferguson, their correspondence and diaries show growing hostility between the bishop and his dean. In 1869, the first Christ Church burned and was rebuilt. The December 5, 1872, dedication service of the new cathedral triggered a definitive break between Hills and Cridge. Hills assigned the newly appointed archdeacon of Vancouver, William Sheldon Reece, to preach at the evensong dedication service. Reece preached from Luke 24:52-53,^{A} to endorse the sacramental focus of the Oxford Movement. As dean, Cridge was presiding over the service and was to announce the post-sermon hymn; instead, Cridge stood and condemned the sermon. "My dearly beloved friends, it is with the greatest shame and humiliation that as a matter of conscience I feel it is my duty to say a few words to you before we part," he said.

As your pastor, after what we have just heard I feel it is my duty to raise up my voice in protest against it... During the seventeen years that I have officiated as your pastor in this spot, this is the first time ritualism has been preached here; and I pray, Almighty God, it may be the last. So far as I can prevent it, it shall be the last.

After Cridge's rebuke, most of the congregation and much of Victoria sided with the local rector over Bishop Hills, who took Cridge's statement as a personal rebuke and demanded an apology. Hills avoided Christ Church for several months, but in July 1873, he announced that he would make an episcopal visit to his cathedral. When the day came, Cridge and a warden blocked Hills from entering the cathedral. After several months of correspondence and increasingly public disputes—Hills from the pulpit, with Cridge responding in newspaper columns—the argument extended to Cridge resisting Hills' efforts to call the first diocesan synod in early 1874. Cridge wrote to Hills that "every congregation, with its accepted pastor, is a complete church ... that the scriptures alone are binding on the consciences of churchmen, and therefore are the virtual law." He added that "the only accountable and lawful expounder and interpreter of this law ... is the pastor of the congregation ... to whom not even the Bishop can dictate"—a position that Anglican archivist Frank Peake called "completely untenable" in an episcopal polity.

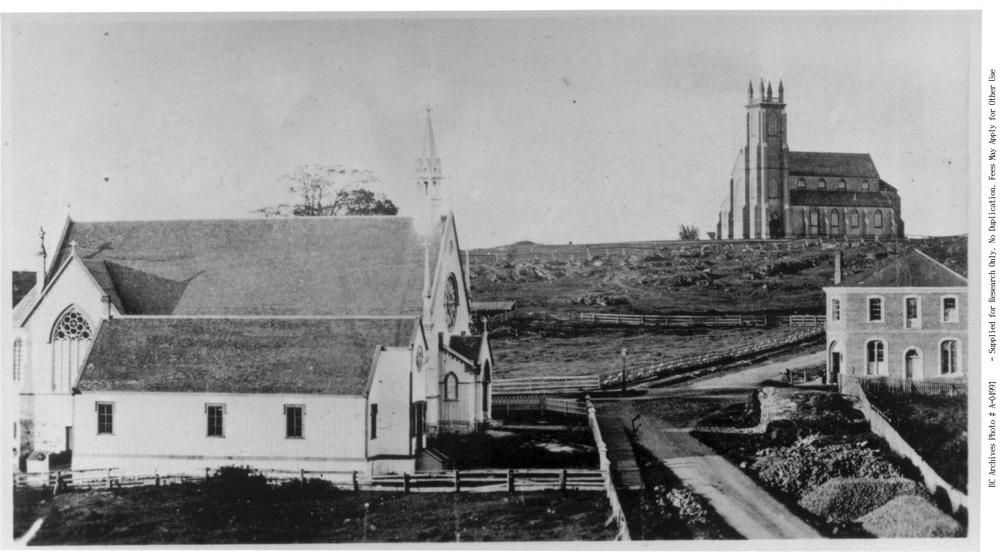
Church of Our Lord (left) and Christ Church Cathedral (right), photographed c. 1870

Finally, in September 1874, Hills held an ecclesiastical trial and suspended Cridge from ministry. According to Ferguson, Cridge believed he was being rebuked for his evangelical convictions, while Hills was focused on the issue of canonical disobedience. (Cridge offered to make an apology, but without acknowledging Hills' prerogative to demand one.) The wardens of Christ Church refused to accept the suspension and invited Cridge to take services at the cathedral.

Hills sought a civil court ruling to enforce the ecclesiastical trial outcome, and on October 24, the Supreme Court of British Columbia issued an injunction that barred Cridge from the cathedral. Three days later, three-fourths of the congregation joined Cridge in leaving to form a new congregation. "We are not seceding from the Anglican Church," Cridge told his new flock, insisting instead that Hills had "virtually seceded from the Anglican Church, and tried to draw the congregation with him; up to last Sunday week we all were more nearly connected with the Anglican Church (with all respect) than the Bishop himself." The new congregation—which would become known as Church of Our Lord—drew 400 worshippers on its first Sunday, including most of the key personnel of the cathedral and Governor Douglas.

== Reformed Episcopal Church ==
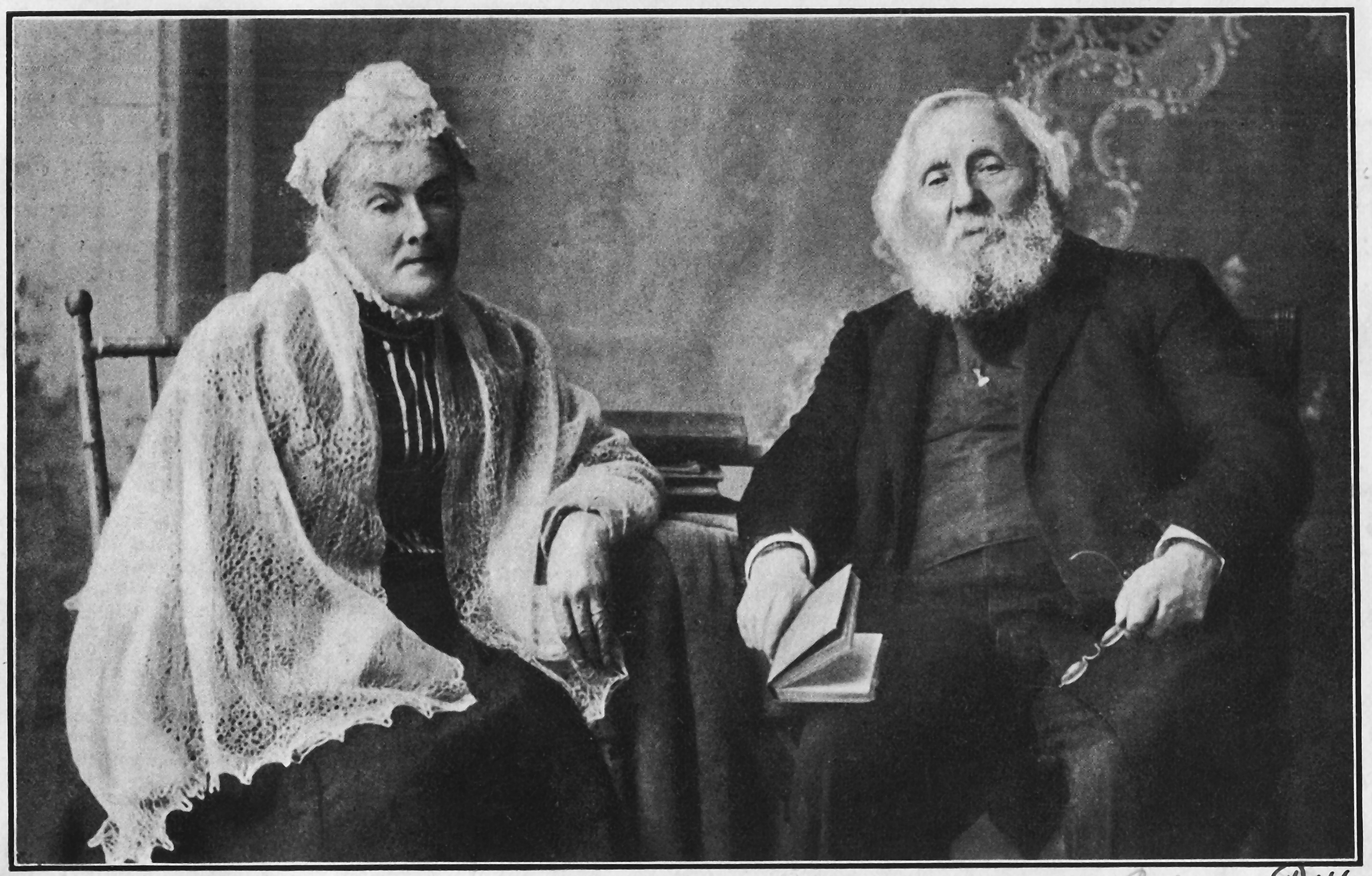
Mary and Edward Cridge later in life

On November 1, as Cridge was preparing for the first Sunday services of his new church, he read in the newspapers about the opening of a Reformed Episcopal Church congregation in Ottawa. The REC was formed in 1873 by George David Cummins and other low church Episcopalians amid a similar conflict over churchmanship in the United States. Cridge received the news about the REC's organization in Canada enthusiastically, and once the Church of Our Lord was organized, he applied for admission to the REC. Douglas donated land near the Christ Church for the new church, whose Carpenter Gothic edifice was completed in 1875.

During the REC's fourth general council in Ottawa in July 1876, Cridge was consecrated an REC bishop alongside Samuel Fallows. Cridge was assigned a missionary jurisdiction that encompassed British Columbia and all U.S. states west of the Rockies while remaining rector of the Church of Our Lord. Cridge also took on an international role for the REC in 1876, traveling to England to consecrate Free Church of England bishops.

== Later life ==
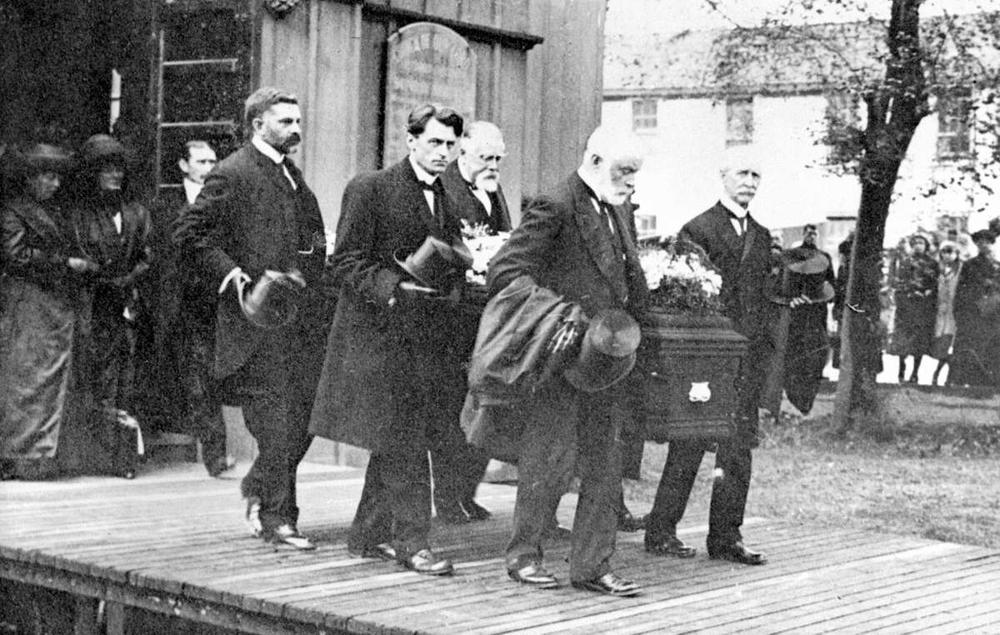
Pallbearers at Cridge's funeral at Church of Our Lord, May 9, 1913

Cridge remained as the rector of Church of Our Lord until 1895 and continued to remain active in civic and social affairs. In 1900, he authored As It Was in the Beginning, a defense of the principle of individual interpretation of the Bible.

Mary Cridge died in 1905 at the age of 78. Edward Cridge's health declined afterward, and he went blind in 1908. He died on May 5, 1913, at the age of 96.

== Legacy ==
According to the Times Colonist, Cridge was known as Victoria's "first social worker", and he and Mary were considered "the early colony's champions for the underprivileged and the unfortunate, and the leading force for social action." The B.C. Protestant Orphans' Home, which expanded its purpose in the 20th century to encompass broader child and family services, marked its 150th anniversary in 2023 and is known as the Cridge Center for the Family. Still based in the 1893 building, the organization was in 2023 British Columbia's oldest continuously operating nonprofit organization. In the 1990s, the Church of Our Lord instituted the Cridge Memorial Theological College to train clergy for the Diocese of Western Canada. A park adjacent to the church bears Cridge's name.

== Notes ==
A. "And they worshiped him and returned to Jerusalem with great joy, and were continually in the temple blessing God." (ESV)

Church of England titles
New title	Dean of Columbia; 1865–1874	Succeeded by Sam Gilson
