= Diocese of Western Canada and Alaska =

Location
- Ecclesiastical province: Anglican Church in North America

Statistics
- Parishes: 22 (*)

Information
- Rite: Anglican

Current leadership
- Bishop: Charles Dorrington
- included 20 parishes of the Missionary District of Cuba

The Diocese of Western Canada and Alaska was a diocese of the Reformed Episcopal Church and the Anglican Church in North America. It also included the Missionary District of Cuba. The diocese was formed in 1996 when the Canadian and American branches of the Reformed Episcopal Church were reunited. It was, at the time, composed of parishes extending back to the founding of the REC in the 1870s. As a part of the Reformed Episcopal Church, the diocese became part of the Anglican Church in North America upon its creation in 2009. It was the smallest of both denominations' dioceses, comprising only two parishes in British Columbia, Canada. Despite its name, the diocese was inactive in Alaska. The diocese also had the Missionary District of Cuba, which was launched in 2003, currently with 20 parishes. Its headquarters were located in Victoria, British Columbia. The first bishop ordinary was E. A. "Ted" Follows, followed by Charles Dorrington.

On 7 October 2012, the REC parish of Church of Our Lord in Victoria merged with Christ the King Anglican Church to form a new congregation which kept the historic name of Church of Our Lord, moving within the jurisdiction of the Anglican Network in Canada.

The diocese had a larger jurisdiction in Cuba due to the presence of the Missionary District since 2003, where it counts 20 parishes in 3 districts. The district's bishop is Willians Mendez Suarez. The Missionary District of Cuba was launched after a special request of people who wished to affiliate with the Reformed Episcopal Church and were unable to do so except with a Canadian jurisdiction because of the United States embargo in the country. It is currently the only jurisdiction of the Anglican Church in North America outside the United States and Canada.

It was decided to extinct the diocese, due to its small size with only Living Word Reformed Episcopal Church remaining in Canada, and to incorporate her at the Diocese of Mid-America, as the Convocation of the West and Western Canada, of which is now a member. Charles Dorrington become an Assisting Bishop for Canada and Cuba at his new diocese.
