= Church of Our Lord (Victoria, British Columbia) =

Church in British Columbia, Canada

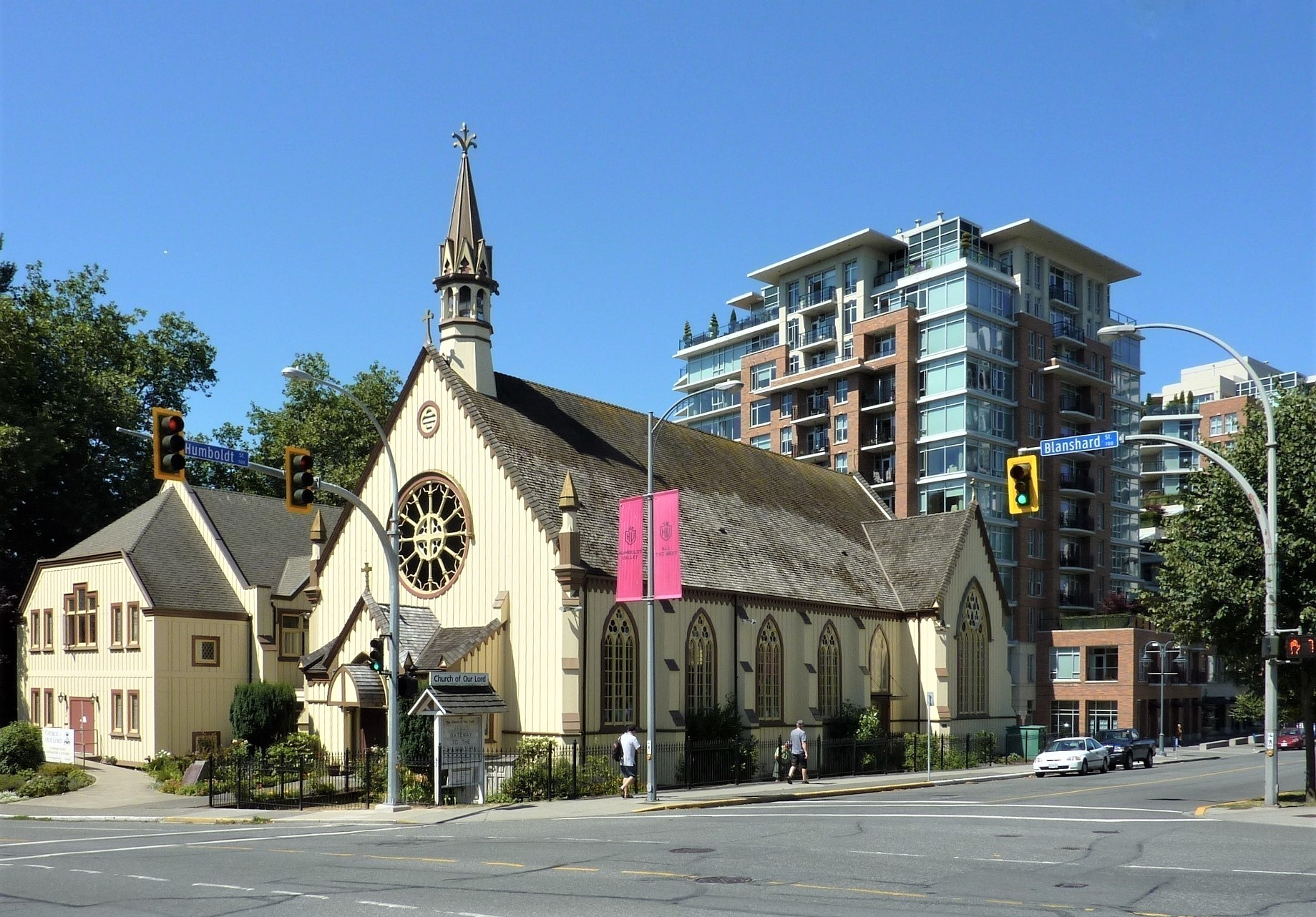
- Interactive map of Church of Our Lord
- 48.420°N 123.364°W
- Type: Church - Religious Building
- Location: 626 Blanshard Street; Victoria, British Columbia; V8W 3G6

History
- Founder: Edward Cridge
- Built: in the period of the 1866-1870: Cost: $9700 bare, $12000 furnished; Size: 104' x 56' x 38'

Site notes
- Elevation: 0 m (0 ft)
- Area: 0 km^{2} (0 sq mi)
- Architect: John Teague
- Architectural style: Carpenter Gothic
- Website: Church of Our Lord

National Historic Site of Canada
- Designated: 1998

The Church of Our Lord, built in 1866-1870 and is located at 626 Blanshard Street in Victoria, British Columbia, Canada, is an historic Carpenter Gothic church that is designated as a National Historic Site of Canada. It was affiliated with the Reformed Episcopal Church at its beginning, which became a member of the Anglican Church in North America, upon its creation in 2009. In 2012, it merged with a local congregation of the Anglican Network in Canada and moved to the jurisdiction of that diocese (now renamed the Anglican Diocese of Canada).

== See also ==
- List of historic places in Victoria, British Columbia
