= Missionary Diocese of Cuba =

Location
- Country: Cuba
- Ecclesiastical province: Reformed Episcopal Church

Statistics
- Parishes: 40

Information
- Rite: Anglican
- Established: 2003
- Suffragan: John Boonzaaijer
- Archdeacon: Alexei Gonzalez Rodriguez

The Missionary Diocese of Cuba (Spanish: Iglesia Episcopal Reformada de Cuba) is a Cuba-based diocese of the Reformed Episcopal Church. Based in Holguín, the diocese currently has approximately 40 congregations with a combined average attendance of 1,000.

== History ==
In July 2003, a small church of about 15 people in Moa asked for episcopal oversight from the Reformed Episcopal Church. Based on Vancouver Island, Bishop Charles Dorrington was assigned to this task. Oversight of churches in Cuba fell to Dorrington's Diocese of Western Canada and Alaska due to the lack of direct U.S.-Cuba relations and limitations on trade and travel.

With the support of the REC and the Anglican Network in Canada, the church in Cuba began to grow. In 2012, Willians Mendez Suarez—who had become pastor of the first REC Cuban church in 2009—was named archdeacon. In 2014, Mendez was consecrated as suffragan bishop of the missionary district.

With the merger of the Diocese of Western Canada and Alaska into the Diocese of Mid-America by the time of the REC's 2017 triennial General Council, the missionary district of Cuba became a missionary diocese under the leadership of Dorrington, assisted by Mendez.

== Current status ==
In 2018, the primary Canadian benefactor of the Cuba mission ended funding. In preparation, the diocese had been developing farm activities to generate income to support the churches, as well as a taxi service.

By 2020, the diocese had grown to more than 40 locations with an average Sunday attendance of 1,000.

While the Missionary Diocese of Cuba is part of the Reformed Episcopal Church, it is not currently a constituent member diocese of the Anglican Church in North America—unlike the United States and Canada-based REC dioceses. However, according to REC bishops, "the ACNA has declared that it is in full communion with [the missionary diocese] and recognizes [its] Orders, sacraments, and congregations, while pledging to labor with them in the work of the Gospel."

== Seminary ==
The diocese operates a seminary in Moa. The seminary offers Lutheran Spanish language video courses and extension courses from Moore Theological College in Australia, and education is overseen by Cranmer House in Dallas.
