= Reformed Episcopal Church =

Anglican church of Episcopalian heritage

- Classification: Christian
- Orientation: Anglican
- Theology: Traditional Anglicanism
- Polity: Episcopal
- Presiding Bishop: Ray R. Sutton
- Associations: FACA; GAFCON
- Full communion: Anglican Church in North America; Anglican Province of America; Free Church of England; Church of Nigeria; Church of Uganda; Province of the Episcopal Church of Sudan
- Region: United States and Canada
- Founder: George David Cummins
- Origin: December 2, 1873; New York City
- Separated from: Protestant Episcopal Church in the USA
- Congregations: 119 (U.S. and Canada, 2025)
- Members: 8,520 (U.S. and Canada, 2025)

The Reformed Episcopal Church (REC) is a Christian church in the Anglican tradition. The REC was founded in 1873 in New York City by George David Cummins, a former bishop of the Episcopal Church.

The REC is a founding member of the Anglican Church in North America (ACNA) and its four U.S. dioceses are member dioceses of ACNA. The REC and ACNA are not members of the Anglican Communion. The REC is in communion with its sister church the Free Church of England. It is also in communion with the Church of Nigeria and the Anglican Province of America.

Due to the death of Royal U. Grote Jr. in 2016, the then vice president of the Reformed Episcopal Church, Ray Sutton, became the presiding bishop of the REC. At the 55th general council of the church in June 2017 in Dallas, Texas, Sutton was elected to be the presiding bishop and David L. Hicks, bishop ordinary of the Diocese of the North East and Mid-Atlantic, was elected as vice-president.

As of 2026, the REC reported 117 parishes and missions in the United States and two in Canada, and also has churches in Croatia, Cuba, Germany, and Serbia. The U.S. and Canadian-based dioceses reported 8,520 members at the end of 2025.

== History ==
George David Cummins, founding bishop

In the 19th century, as the Oxford Movement urged that the Protestant Episcopal Church and the Church of England return to Anglicanism's roots in pre-Reformation Catholic Christianity, George David Cummins, the Assistant Bishop of the Episcopal Diocese of Kentucky, became concerned about the preservation of Protestant, Evangelical, Reformed, and Confessional principles within the church.

The founding of the Reformed Episcopal Church followed an 1873 controversy about ecumenical activity. In October of that year, Cummins joined with Robert Payne Smith, Dean of Canterbury, William Augustus Muhlenberg, and some non-Anglican ministers at an ecumenical conference of the American branch of the Evangelical Alliance. During the conference, held in New York City, Cummins, Smith and the non-Episcopalian ministers presided at joint services of Holy Communion without using any version of the Book of Common Prayer. Retired missionary bishop William Tozer, who was visiting New York at the time, criticized Smith and implicitly Cummins for participating in the rite. Tozer's criticism appeared in a letter published by the New York Tribune on October 6, 1873.

Cummins defended his actions in a letter published 10 days later, but after criticisms from Anglo-Catholic clergy and others for his choice not to seek preaching permission from the bishop in whose diocese he was preaching without authorization (New York), he submitted a letter of resignation to his own bishop on November 10. Three weeks later, joined by 21 Episcopalian clergy and lay people, Cummins organized the first general council of the Reformed Episcopal Church in New York City on December 2, 1873.

Cummins and his followers considered his action not rash decisions but simply decisive action, founded upon their long-held convictions about the growing Anglo-Catholic practices within the church. While these practices had existed from the founding of the Church of England, the Tractarian or Oxford Movement had been growing in influence, much to Cummins' dismay. He described his understanding's evolution in a letter to Bishop Cheney, stressing his earlier attempts to create reforms within the Protestant Episcopal Church. "We went before the General Conventions of 1868 and 1871 with petitions signed by hundreds of clergymen and laymen from all parts of the land, asking relief for Evangelical men. We asked but three things, the use of an alternate phrase in the baptismal office for infants, the repeal of the canon closing our pulpits against all non-Episcopal clergymen, and the insertion of a note in the Prayer-book, declaring the term "Priest" to be of equivalent meaning with the word Presbyter. We were met by an indignant and almost contemptuous refusal." These failed earlier attempts and Tozer's criticism of the ecumenical communion service Cummins thought an opportunity for decisive action.

Some in the Protestant Episcopal Church saw Cummins' decision as schismatic. Others, however, disagreed. One correspondent of the publication "The Episcopalian" said, "If we say that this new church has begun in schism, the church of Rome alleges the same things against us. The real question is, which party is guilty of the schism, the party which separates and goes out? or the party that forces the separation, by making binding on the conscience what Christ has not made binding?" Rather than characterize this as schism, Cummins and his fellow reformers portrayed themselves as providing a Protestant, Anglican identity under which there could be a 'closer union of all Evangelical Christendom.' "The Reformed Episcopal Church would be what the Protestant Episcopal Church might have become had it not been paralyzed by the Tractarian virus." The term "Reformed" was never intended to denote any Calvinistic sense of Reformed theology, but was intended to convey Cummins' purpose of an Episcopal Church that had been reformed against Catholic influences. The founders of the church would often stylise the name as The Re-Formed Episcopal Church, for disambiguation so that it was known this was the Episcopal Church Re-Formed and not of a reformed theology. Cummins was in attendance at a Convention on 21 October 1868 and was greatly disappointed by the "Catholic" practices which he witnessed: "[a]ltars erected, with super-altars, with burning candles, and floating clouds of incense; the communion service set in a Roman framework ... there is a departure from the doctrinal basis of the Reformation." Cummins' feelings grew stronger after reading an essay titled "Are There Romanising Germs in the Prayer Book?" which asserted that the Romanisation of the church and the Holy Eucharistic service was not an influence from the outside but, rather came from inside the church – it was in the Prayer Book itself, thus; Cummins started pushing stronger against the "Roman germs", which caused him to lose friends on both sides: Anglo-Catholics and Evangelicals alike.

=== Early growth ===
==== In the United States ====
Within six months of its founding in 1873, the REC grew to about 1,500 communicants, two bishops and 15 other ministers. In 1875, over 500 African-American Protestant Episcopal communicants in South Carolina's Low Country joined the REC as a group.

==== In Canada ====
Within a year from the founding of the REC, like-minded Canadian Anglicans in New Brunswick and Ontario seceded from that Church and formed Reformed Episcopal congregations. In October 1874, Edward Cridge, dean of the Anglican cathedral in Victoria, British Columbia, withdrew with about 350 of his congregation to form the Church of Our Lord and join the Reformed Episcopal Church. Cridge was consecrated a bishop for the REC in 1876. Many of the Canadian Reformed Episcopal Churches joined the United Church at its founding. The Reformed Episcopal Church now has three churches in Canada, two in British Columbia and one in Ontario. St. George's Church, Hamilton is affiliated with the Diocese of the Northeast in the US, and both Holy Trinity Church in Colwood and Living Word in Courtenay are a part of the Diocese of Western Canada and Alaska.

==== In England ====
In 1877, in response to a petition from REC sympathizers in England, the REC's Fifth General Council acted to establish the Reformed Episcopal Church in that country. Former Church of England minister Thomas Huband Gregg was consecrated a bishop to lead adherents there. By 1910 there were 28 ministers and 1,990 communicant members constituting the Reformed Episcopal Church in that country. In 1927, the Reformed Episcopal Church in England merged with the Free Church of England with which the REC remains in full communion.

=== Developments since 2000 ===
==== Eastern Canada diocese merged ====
In 2009, Bishop Michael Fedechko retired as ordinary of the Diocese of Central and Eastern Canada, and the diocese's parishes came under the supervision of the Diocese of the Northeast and Mid-Atlantic. Bishop Fedechko subsequently became affiliated with the Independent Anglican Church Canada Synod.

==== Revised Book of Common Prayer ====
Revised editions of the REC Book of Common Prayer were issued in 2003 and 2005 (see below).

== Current status ==
The Reformed Episcopal Church reported that it had 13,600 members in 2009. In 2016, total membership had fallen to 6,927. In 2022, the church reported a total membership of 7,602, a 9.7% increase from six years prior.

=== Dioceses ===
==== United States ====
The Reformed Episcopal Church was originally divided into four synods. The synods were renamed dioceses in 1984. As of 2016, there are four U.S. dioceses with 108 parishes and missions:

Diocese	Territory	Cathedral	See City	Bishop(s)	Founded	Number of Congregations (2025)	Membership (2025)	Average Sunday Attendance (2025)
Central States	Alabama, Indiana, Kentucky, North Carolina, Ohio, Tennessee, Virginia, West Virginia	None	Mason, Ohio	Jason Grote	2008	22	1,616	1,233
Mid-America	All U.S. states west of the Mississippi River; Illinois, Michigan, Mississippi, and Wisconsin; all Canadian provinces and territories west of Manitoba.	Cathedral Church of the Holy Communion	Dallas	Ordinary: Ray R. Sutton; Suffragans: Walter Banek, Charlie Camlin	1996	42	3,046	2,237
Northeast and Mid-Atlantic	All U.S. states north and east of and including Maryland and Pennsylvania; all Canadian provinces and territories east of Saskatchewan	None	Philadelphia	William A. Jenkins Sr.	1984	22	1,430	884
Southeast	Florida, Georgia, South Carolina, District of Columbia	None	Summerville, South Carolina	Willie J. Hill Jr.	1984	33	2,428	1,459

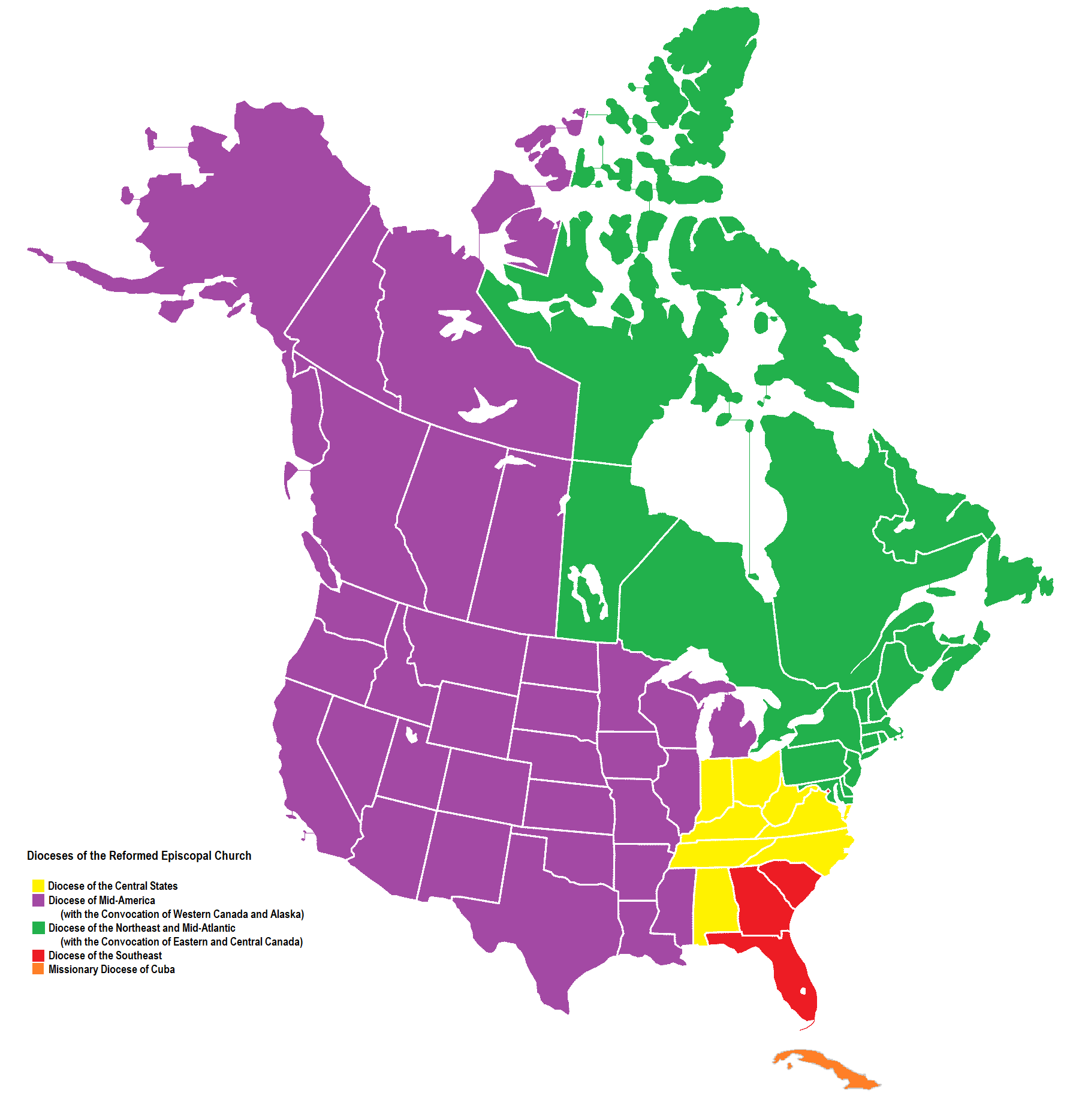
Map of the North American dioceses of the Reformed Episcopal Church as of 2023.

From 2008 to 2016 an additional U.S. Diocese of the West existed. It had been formed as a Missionary Diocese from the Diocese of Mid-America and attained full diocesan status when churches from the Anglican Province of America joined the REC in 2008, led by Winfield Mott. In April 2016, the diocesan synod voted to dissolve the diocese due to its small size and merge with ACNA's Missionary Diocese of All Saints. The Diocese of Western Canada and Alaska, created in 1996, had two parishes in British Columbia, led by Charles Dorrington, and also included the Missionary District of Cuba. Due to his small size, the diocese was extinct and incorporated in the Diocese of Mid-America as the Convocation of the West and Western Canada, of which Charles Dorrington is an Assisting Bishop.

==== Other countries ====
- The Missionary Diocese of Cuba, with over 30 parishes and missions, is under the supervision of suffragan bishop John Boonzaaijer.
- The Protestant Reformed Christian Church in Croatia has three parishes and two missions in Croatia. It became the jurisdiction of the REC in 2011. The PRCC was founded in 2001 when several parishes left the Reformed Christian Calvinist Church in Croatia. The assistant bishop is Jasmin Milić.
- In Germany, one of three expressions of the Anglican Church in Germany called "Anglikanische Kirche in Deutschland" or "Reformierte Episkopalkirche". It has ten congregations and missions. The bishop ordinary is Gerhard Meyer. The other two expressions, which (in contrast) belong to the Anglican Communion, are the Diocese of Europe of the Church of England and the Convocation of Episcopal Churches in Europe from the USA.

== Relations with other jurisdictions ==
=== Formation of Anglican Church in North America ===
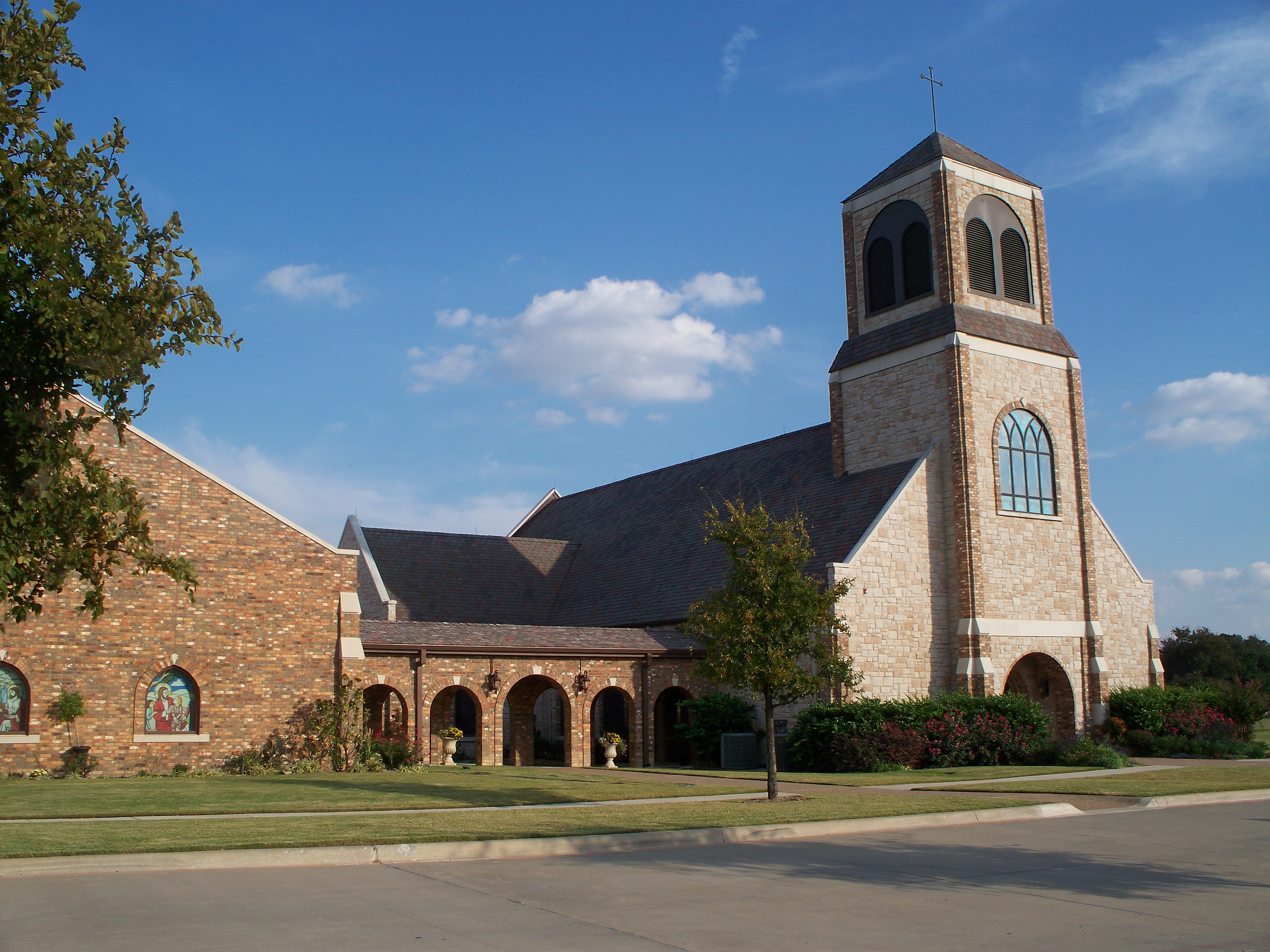
Church of the Holy Communion in North Dallas, Texas. Seat of Bishop Ray Sutton.

In 2009, the REC became a founding member of the Anglican Church in North America (ACNA), a denomination seeking to create a new Anglican Communion province distinct from the Episcopal Church. ACNA is in communion with the Anglican Churches of Uganda, Nigeria and Sudan, with approximately 30 million members worldwide, representing approximately one-third of the faithful of the Anglican Communion.

=== Earlier developments ===
The REC in North America has been in full communion with the Free Church of England since 1927, when Reformed Episcopal congregations and clergy in England merged with the FCE. Bishops of the two churches take part in episcopal consecrations of the other, and there are periodic visits between them. On occasion REC clergy have served in FCE parishes and vice versa. As of 2018, there are two FCE dioceses in England and one diocese in South America.

In 1998 the REC signed a concordat of intercommunion for the first time with an Anglo-Catholic communion, the Anglican Province of America (APA). A 2005 renewal of the agreement also established intercommunion with the Anglican Communion's Church of Nigeria. This agreement of intercommunion between Reformed Episcopal Church and Church of Nigeria (Anglican Communion) gives privilege for Church of Nigeria Priests in diaspora to be licensed and practice in any jurisdiction of REC. Recently in 2018 NEMA-REC accepted and licensed priests who are immigrants in the United States.

An additional proposal would have led to an eventual merger between the APA and the REC, but the APA's decision not to join the new Anglican Church in North America in 2008 is an obstacle to the proposed merger.

== Slavery and emancipation ==
=== George David Cummins ===
George David Cummins, the founding bishop of the REC, was the son of a slaveholder. Cummins' view of slavery maintained there was nothing inherently sinful about slave-holding and that the practice, in and of itself, was never condemned in Scripture as being an abomination to God or harmful to mankind. He qualified this statement with certain opinions pertaining to the practice. Although he was not anti-slavery, his view of slavery and the African-American differed considerably from that of many of his contemporaries.

According to Cummins the African-American slave is "of one blood with ourselves, a sharer in common humanity, a partaker of our hopes and fear." This attitude did not compel him to endorse emancipation; he was, however, convinced of the need for a stance of paternalism. Cummins charged slaveholders to be more responsible and caring of their slaves: "The Anglo-American [is] the tutelar guardian of the African," adding that it is the responsibility of white Americans "to regard the African race in bondage as a solemn trust committed to these people from God, and that He has given this great mission of working out His purposes and mercy and love towards them." He believed that freed slaves should return to Africa and create a livelihood for themselves.

=== Ordination of black clergy ===
Following the passing of the Thirteenth Amendment to the United States Constitution, black churches with black clergy and officiates sought inclusion into various dioceses and denominations. While some dioceses of the Episcopal Church were more open to the inclusion of black congregations, there were many dioceses who, as a collective whole, disowned and rejected blacks from the Episcopal communion.

Frank C. Ferguson, a former slave and a minister of a black congregation, experienced such discrimination. This ultimately led his congregation, and four others, to leave the Protestant Episcopal Church and move to the REC. Despite his earlier comments on slavery and emancipation, Cummins accepted black congregations and clergy into the REC. He faced reluctance from Northern whites in his own General Council as from South Carolina whites in their diocesan convention. The Reformed Episcopal Seminary became one of the first seminaries to be racially inclusive.

== Doctrine ==
=== Acceptance of other Evangelical clergy ===
REC ministers, like ministers of the Protestant Episcopal Church, exchanged pulpits with evangelical ministers of non-episcopal traditions. They viewed the ministries of the word and sacraments in other evangelical denominations as equally valid. True churches of Christ existed outside episcopal church structures, they held, contrary to Tractarian and High Church teaching. Inter-evangelical collegiality was an important issue for the REC, because Cummins had been censured for participation with Presbyterian and Methodist ministers in an inter-church communion service. This practice of the founders' praxis and belief has now been abandoned. The current praxis is to require reordination and regularization of orders if ordained outside episcopal ordination.

At its first general council on December 2, 1873, the REC also reformed the transfer of clergy credentials from other denominations. In the Episcopal Church, such transfers had involved a process of application, examination, reception, and in some cases, conferral of holy orders, understood as a "regularization". In contrast, the REC allowed for examination in points of doctrine and discipline for validation of conformity yet without reordination.

=== Contemporary positions and controversies ===
==== Theological diversity ====
Although the REC was founded as an evangelical and Reformed Anglican body, it now has Anglo-Catholics among its members and has entered into an intercommunion agreement with an Anglo-Catholic body, the APA. A 2006 document of the REC bishops, "True Unity by the Cross of Christ", grants wider flexibility to re-interpret the Thirty-nine Articles in an Anglo-Catholic manner while maintaining the perspective of the English Reformers. It uses the terms "priest", "altar", and "Real Presence", and speaks of the authority of tradition as well as that of Holy Scripture.

Reformed critics characterize these developments as rejecting the 39 Articles, revising the force of the Declaration of Principles, as well as departing from the Church's evangelical and Reformed heritage in order to accommodate Anglo-Catholicism.

==== Role of women in ministry ====
The church does not ordain women as bishops, presbyters, or deacons. In 2002, the denomination approved a canon that provides for the "setting apart" of qualified women as deaconesses who are not considered by the church to be ordained. While they are not considered ordained they do have important functions within the ministry of the church. Canon 22 states, "The duty of the Deaconess is to assist the Minister in the care of the poor and sick, the religious training of the young and others, and the work of moral reformation." Deaconesses in the Reformed Episcopal Church may have liturgical responsibilities; however they do not have eucharistic responsibilities beyond that allowed to any other member of the laity.

Some conservative Anglicans, especially those within the Continuing Anglican churches, have criticized the REC for uniting with the Anglican Church in North America (ACNA) since certain ACNA dioceses ordain women to Holy Orders. In the ACNA, each diocese may choose whether to ordain women as deacons and priests. Women are not ordained as bishops in the ACNA.

==== Clergy transfers ====
Under the current canons of the Reformed Episcopal Church, a non-REC minister entering into the REC ministry as a deacon or presbyter is to receive Holy Orders if he has not already been ordained by a bishop recognized by REC as in the historic succession. If previously ordained in a non-episcopal church, the applicant to the REC may need to be regularized.

== Book of Common Prayer ==
=== 1873 edition ===
The founding First General Council of the REC approved a Book of Common Prayer for the church, with a text based on the proposed 1785 BCP prepared by William Smith and William White (later the first Episcopal Bishop of Pennsylvania).

This text, published in 1786, had been offered to the First General Convention at Philadelphia held in 1785. Although initially authorized in some states, its changes met with considerable resistance, and the Episcopal Church adopted a different text in 1789 as its Book of Common Prayer.

=== Later editions ===
The REC Book of Common Prayer was updated in 1930 and 1963, and incorporated elements of the 1928 BCP of the Protestant Episcopal Church, while retaining the Evangelical distinctions of the REC.

The Reformed Episcopal Church began a process of historical return, theological transformation and liturgical revision in the 1990s with the first revised BCP for trial use being produced in 1999. The 49th and 50th General Councils of the REC approved a revision of the Book of Common Prayer to be based on the Church of England's 1662 Book of Common Prayer, with elements drawn from several later Books (PECUSA 1928 and 1945, REC 1963, Australia 1978). The revised version was issued in 2003. with a subsequent update in 2005.

== Seminaries ==
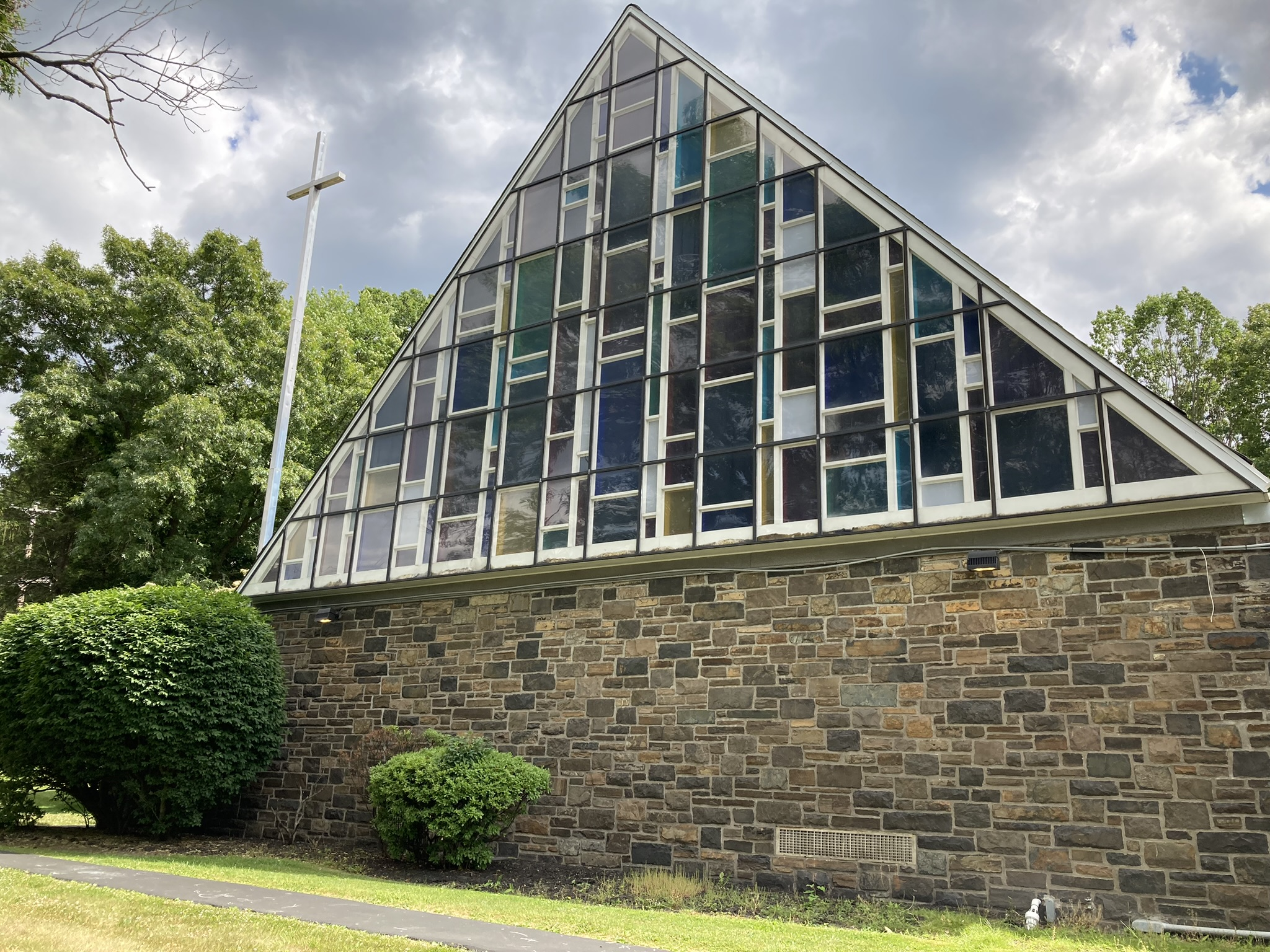
Reformed Episcopal Seminary's chapel in Oreland, Pennsylvania

The Reformed Episcopal Church has three seminaries.

=== Reformed Episcopal Seminary ===
The Theological Seminary of the Reformed Episcopal Church, otherwise known as Reformed Episcopal Seminary, is the largest and oldest of the seminaries of the Reformed Episcopal Church and is accredited by the Association of Theological Schools. It began offering classes in 1886 in West Philadelphia and was chartered in 1887. Now located in Oreland, Pennsylvania, it offers Master of Divinity (M. Div.), a Certificate in Bible and Theology, and a Licentiate in Diaconal or Deaconess Ministry.

=== Cummins Seminary ===
Cummins Memorial Theological Seminary trains students within and outside of the Anglican tradition. Founded in 1876 by Bishop Peter Fayssoux Stevens, it is the oldest American seminary that has historically trained African Americans for ministry in the Episcopal tradition. As of 2020, it was unaccredited and mostly operated as a night school for those who work full-time, offering a master of divinity, master of arts in Christian leadership, and bachelor of theology degrees. It moved to its present campus in Summerville, South Carolina, in 1980.

=== Cranmer House ===
Cranmer Theological House was founded in 1994 in Shreveport, Louisiana. It later relocated to Houston and then to the Church of the Holy Communion in Dallas. It offers a variety of degree and certificate programs through on-campus, extension and online channels. As of 2025, the seminary had pursued accreditation with the Association of Theological Schools but remained unaccredited. Cranmer House also publishes an open-access, peer-reviewed, biennial journal called the Cranmer Theological Journal.

== See also ==
- List of bishops of the Reformed Episcopal Church
- Anglican Church in North America
- Federation of Anglican Churches in the Americas
- Anglican Province of America
- Free Church of England
- Continuing Anglican movement

== Bibliography ==
- Acker, Keith J., Susanne Barrett, and Alice Acker. Book of Common Prayer 2011: And Administration of the Sacraments, Other Rites, and Ceremonies of the Church Together with the Form and Manner of Making, Ordaining and Consecrating Bishops, Priests, and Deacons: Together with the Psalter. San Diego, CA: Lava Rock Media, 2011.
- Free Church of England. Constitution and Canons Ecclesiastical. [Place of publication not identified]: [publisher not identified], 1983.
- Holy Trinity Reformed Episcopal Church (Charleston, S.C.). Historic Holy Trinity Reformed Episcopal Church One Hundred and Fifteenth Church Anniversary, 1875-1990: Sunday July 1, 1990, 4:00 pm, 51 Bull Street, Charleston, South Carolina; Rev. Fred Garnett, Paster [Sic]. [Charleston, S.C.]: [Holy Trinity Reformed Episcopal Church], 1990.
- Reformed Episcopal Church. Book of Common Praise. Anglican House Pub Inc, 2018. ISBN 9780997921151.
- Reformed Episcopal Church. The Book of Common Prayer: And Administration of the Sacraments and Other Rites and Ceremonies of the Church, According to the Use of the Reformed Episcopal Church in North America, Together with the Psalter or Psalms of David. [Philadelphia, Pa.?]: [Publication Society of the Reformed Episcopal Church?], 2005.
- Reformed Episcopal Church. The Reformed Episcopal Church: What Is It? Philadelphia, Pa: Reformed Episcopal Publication Society, 1950.
- Reformed Episcopal Church in Canada. St. Bartholomew (Montréal, Québec). Québec, Ile-De-Montréal, Montréal, Church Records. [Sainte-Foy, Québec]: Archives nationales du Québec, 1986. Notes: Images numériques des originals in the Archives nationales du Québec at Sainte-Foy, Québec. These records were created by the clergy to be turned in as part of civil registration in Québec. Contains baptisms, marriages and burials with some volumes indexed, 1878–1882.
