= George Fincke =

American Anglican bishop

The Right Reverend George B. Fincke
- Missionary Bishop of the West
- Church: Reformed Episcopal Church
- Diocese: Diocese of Mid-America
- In office: 1996–2000
- Other posts: Assisting Bishop, Diocese of Mid-America

Orders
- Consecration: June 21, 1996 by Leonard W. Riches

Personal details
- Born: November 21, 1953 Camden, New Jersey
- Died: December 3, 2016 (aged 63) Prescott, Arizona

George Brian Fincke (November 21, 1953 – December 3, 2016) was an American Anglican bishop of the Reformed Episcopal Church (REC).

== Early life ==
Fincke was born to a Presbyterian minister, the Rev. George W. Fincke Jr., and Mary Louise Patterson Fincke in Camden, New Jersey, in 1953.

== Ministry career ==
He was ordained as a presbyter in 1981 and was received into the Reformed Episcopal Church in 1986. He had an M.Div. from Reformed Episcopal Seminary and served in the Diocese of the Northeast and Mid-Atlantic before his election as bishop ordinary of the nascent Missionary Diocese of the West. In addition to serving as a bishop, Fincke also served as a parish pastor in California.

In October 2000, Fincke suffered a stroke and was substantially disabled. As a result, his office as bishop ordinary of the Missionary Diocese of the West was declared vacant. After his recovery, Fincke served as an assisting bishop in the Diocese of Mid-America and a rector in Fargo, North Dakota. In 2015, Fincke became rector of an Anglican Province of America congregation in Prescott, Arizona.

== Personal life ==
Fincke was married for 37 years to Ann Caskey. They had three daughters and one son. Fincke died on December 3, 2016, in Prescott.
