= Frank V. C. Cloak =

American Reformed Episcopal bishop (1876–1953)

The Right Reverend Frank V. C. Cloak D.D.
- Presiding Bishop of the Reformed Episcopal Church
- Church: Reformed Episcopal Church
- Diocese: Synod of Chicago
- In office: 1937–1951
- Predecessor: Robert Westly Peach
- Successor: Joseph Edgar Kearney
- Other posts: Bishop ordinary, Synod of Chicago (1931–1953)

Orders
- Consecration: November 9, 1931 by Robert Westly Peach

Personal details
- Born: 1876
- Died: October 2, 1953 (aged 77) Philadelphia, Pennsylvania, United States

Frank V. C. Cloak (1876 – October 2, 1953) was an American Reformed Episcopal bishop. He was the presiding bishop of the Reformed Episcopal Church (REC) from 1937 to 1951 and bishop ordinary of the Synod of Chicago from 1931 until his death. Despite presiding over the Chicago synod, he lived in his native Philadelphia. Cloak was a graduate of Northeast High School and the Reformed Episcopal Seminary. He was a high school teacher, and he served as rector of Emmanuel Reformed Episcopal Church from 1907 to 1926 and as rector of Christ Memorial Reformed Episcopal Church in West Philadelphia from 1926 to 1948. He was elevated to the episcopate in 1931.

Religious titles
Preceded by Samuel Fallows	REC Bishop of Chicago; 1931–1953	Succeeded by Franklin Sellers
Preceded by Robert Westly Peach	Presiding Bishop of the Reformed Episcopal Church; 1937–1951	Succeeded by Joseph E. Kearney
