= Daniel Cox (bishop) =

American Anglican bishop

The Right Reverend Daniel G. Cox
- Assistant Bishop of the Northeast and Mid-Atlantic
- Church: Reformed Episcopal Church
- Diocese: Northeast and Mid-Atlantic
- Other posts: Rector, Bishop Cummins Reformed Episcopal Church

Orders
- Ordination: 1952 (diaconate); 1954 (presbyterate)
- Consecration: June 6, 1984 by Theophilus Herter

Personal details
- Born: November 15, 1931 Abington Township, Pennsylvania
- Died: October 16, 2021 (aged 89) Maryland

Daniel Gilbert Cox (November 15, 1931 – October 16, 2021) was an American bishop of the Reformed Episcopal Church. He also served for 36 years as rector of Bishop Cummins Reformed Episcopal Church, overseeing its move from its historic building in Baltimore to Catonsville, Maryland.

== Early life, education and early ministry ==
Cox was born to Newton and Irene Cox in Abington Township, Pennsylvania, in 1931, as the third of four children. He graduated from Abington Township School and matriculated directly at Reformed Episcopal Seminary, graduating with a B.D. in 1952. That year, Cox was ordained to the diaconate and began work as a minister at Koontz Memorial Chapel (now Faith REC) in East Baltimore. In 1954, Cox was ordained as a presbyter and married the former Patricia Stiemly. They had one son, Stephen. During his early years in ministry, Cox completed a B.S. in social sciences from Johns Hopkins University.

== Bishop Cummins REC ==
In 1960, Cox was called as rector of Bishop Cummins Memorial Church, which was in the process of relocating its longtime West Baltimore location—which would later be listed in the National Register of Historic Places—to Catonsville. He worked alongside then Baltimore City Councilman William Donald Schaefer, who was a longtime member, vestryman and treasurer at Cummins Memorial Church, to facilitate the move.

In July 1974, Cox officiated at the wedding of Michael Ford, son of then-Vice President Gerald Ford, who would assume the presidency the following month. The younger Ford married Gayle Brumbaugh, daughter of Bishop Cummins parishioners. The wedding took place at a different church since Bishop Cummins REC was being renovated. He also had a lifelong association and friendship with disability advocate Joni Eareckson Tada, who grew up at Bishop Cummins REC.

During the 1980s, Bishop Cummins REC began assisting with the relocation of Ethiopian and Eritrean refugees in the Baltimore area. Cox supported the formation of the Tewahedo Mekane Selam Eyesus Ethiopian Orthodox Church, which held its services at Bishop Cummins before moving into its own church building.

== Episcopacy and later life ==
On November 3, 1983, Cox and Royal U. Grote were elected assistant bishops in the New York and Philadelphia Synod, the predecessor institution to the Diocese of the Northeast and Mid-Atlantic. Cox was consecrated at Bishop Cummins REC by Presiding Bishop Theophilus Herter on June 6, 1984. He retired as assistant bishop in 1994 but continued to serve as rector of Bishop Cummins until 1996. Cox was also chairman of the board of trustees of Reformed Episcopal Seminary.

In retirement, Cox continued to serve part-time in ministry and was interim rector of St. Stephen’s Reformed Episcopal Church in Eldersburg, Maryland, in the late 1990s. He died in Maryland in 2021 at the age of 89, survived by his wife, son and grandchildren.

== Awards ==
- Maryland Governor’s Citation, 1990
