= Robert Rudolph =

Robert Rudolph may refer to:

- Robert Knight Rudolph (1906–1986), American Reformed Episcopal minister and theologian
- Robert Livingston Rudolph (1865–1930), American bishop of the Reformed Episcopal Church
