= Synod of New York and Philadelphia =

Synod of New York and Philadelphia is a former name for two different entities:

- The Synod of the Trinity of the Presbyterian Church (USA)
- The Diocese of the Northeast and Mid-Atlantic in the Reformed Episcopal Church
