= Franklin Sellers =

American Reformed Episcopalian bishop

The Most Reverend Franklin H. Sellers
- Presiding Bishop of the Reformed Episcopal Church
- Church: Reformed Episcopal Church
- Diocese: Synod of Chicago
- In office: 1990–1996
- Predecessor: William Jerdan Jr.
- Successor: Leonard W. Riches
- Previous post(s): Bishop ordinary, Synod of Chicago (1974–1996)

Orders
- Ordination: December 13, 1950 (diaconate) by Frank V. C. Cloak
- Consecration: December 5, 1974 by Howard D. Higgins

Personal details
- Born: 1926; Philadelphia, Pennsylvania, U.S.
- Died: January 17, 2016 (aged 89); Naples, Florida, U.S.

Franklin Henry Sellers (1926 – January 17, 2016) was an American Reformed Episcopalian bishop. He was the presiding bishop of the Reformed Episcopal Church (REC), from 1990 to 1996 and bishop ordinary of the Synod of Chicago from 1974 to 1996.

== Biography ==
Sellers was born in 1926 in Philadelphia. He served in the United States Army Air Corps in World War II, then enrolled in the Reformed Episcopal Seminary. He was called as rector of St. Andrew's Church, then located on the South Side of Chicago, and was ordained as a deacon in December 1950 and as a presbyter the following year. He remained as rector of St. Andrew's until 1990.

In 1974, Sellers was elected and consecrated bishop of the Synod of Chicago, a seat that had been vacant for nearly 20 years and filled on an interim basis by the presiding bishop of the REC. He remained as bishop ordinary until 1996, when the Synod of Chicago and Special Jurisdiction of North America were merged into the Diocese of Mid-America. Sellers also served two three-year terms as presiding bishop of the REC from 1990 to 1996

Sellers retired as rector of St. Andrew's in 1990 and relocated to Florida with his wife, Doris. They had four adult sons and several grandchildren. They lived in Marco Island until her death in 2015 and his in January 2016.

Religious titles
Preceded by Frank V. C. Cloak	REC Bishop of Chicago; 1974–1996	Succeeded by Royal U. Grote Jr.
Preceded by William Jerdan Jr.	Presiding Bishop of the Reformed Episcopal Church; 1990–1996	Succeeded by Leonard W. Riches
