= Latané =

Latané or Latane is a surname. Notable people with the surname include:

- Bibb Latané (born 1937), United States social psychologist
- James Allen Latané (1831–1902), born in Essex County, Virginia
- James Latane Noel, Jr. (1909–1997), United States federal judge
- Robert Latane Montague (1829–1880), Virginia politician who served in the Confederate States Congress during the American Civil War
