= David L. Hicks =

American Anglican bishop (born 1963)

The Right Reverend David L. Hicks
- Bishop Ordinary of the Diocese of the Northeast and Mid-Atlantic of the Reformed Episcopal Church (Retired)
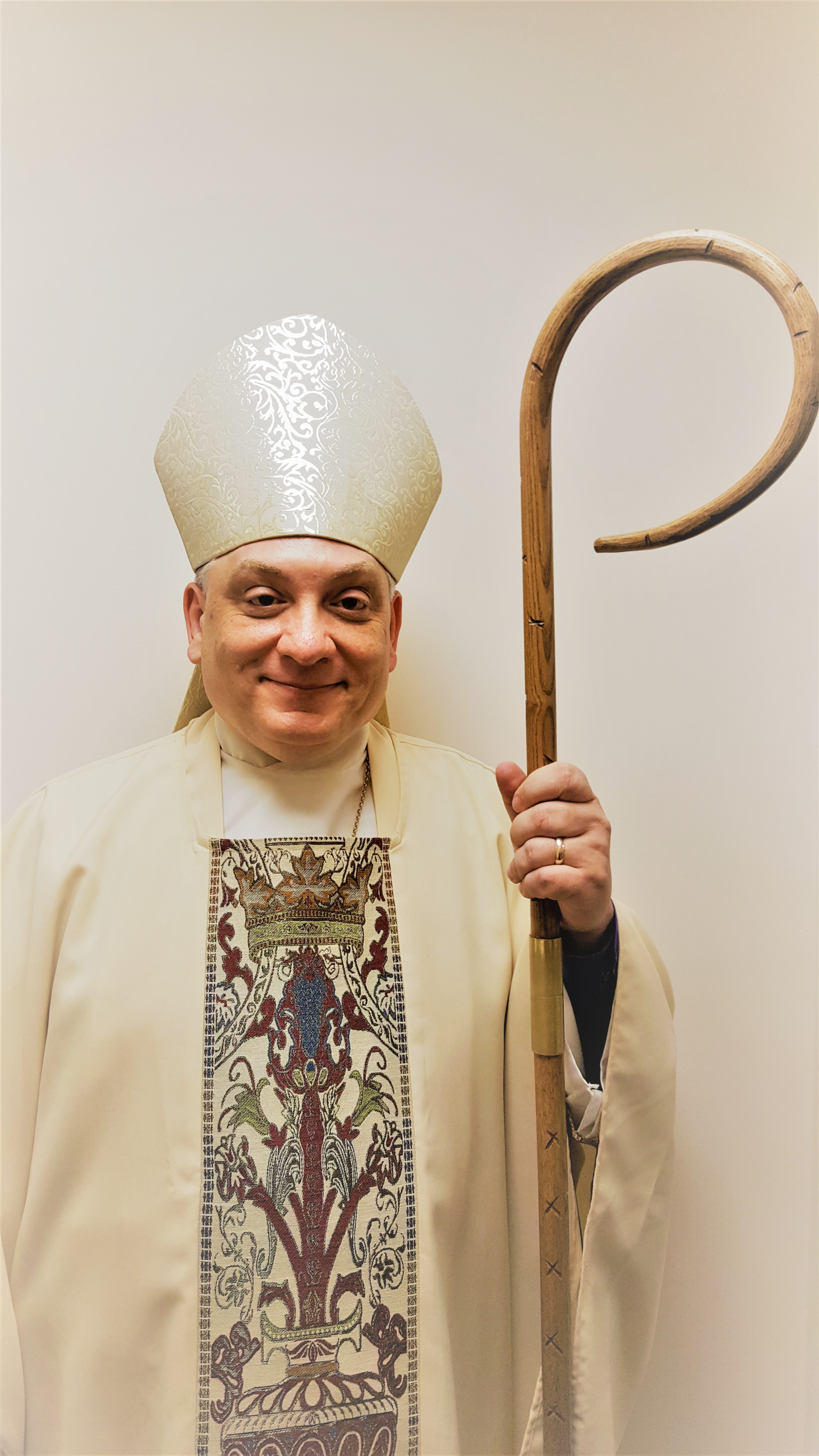
- Hicks after chapel at RES on May 17, 2018
- Church: Reformed Episcopal Church, Anglican Church in North America
- Diocese: Diocese of the Northeast and Mid-Atlantic
- In office: 2008–2019
- Predecessor: Leonard W. Riches
- Successor: R. Charles Gillin
- Previous post: Pastoral Ministry at Saint Paul’s Reformed Episcopal Church Oreland, PA

Orders
- Ordination: 1990 (deacon); 1992 (priest) by Leonard W. Riches
- Consecration: 2005 by Leonard W. Riches

Personal details
- Born: David Lee Hicks; 1963 (age 62–63) Salem County, New Jersey

David Lee Hicks (born 1963) is an American Anglican bishop. He was bishop coadjutor in the Diocese of the Northeast and Mid-Atlantic of the Reformed Episcopal Church, from 2005 to 2008 and served as bishop ordinary from 2008 to 2019. He had been also a bishop of the Anglican Church in North America, since the Reformed Episcopal Church was one of the founding bodies that joined at its inception, beginning in 2009. He also served as president and chancellor of the Reformed Episcopal Seminary as well as on various committees.

He currently serves as rector of St. Peter's Anglican Church in Butler, PA within the Anglican Diocese of Pittsburgh.

== Personal life ==
Hicks is married to Lisa Hicks. They have three grown children.

== Education ==
- Alma Mater – Pennsville Christian Academy, Pennsville, New Jersey
- Bachelor of Biblical Studies [BBS] – Valley Forge Christian College, Phoenixville, PA (1984)
- Master's in Arts of Religion – Biblical Studies [MAR – Biblical Studies] – Westminster Theological Seminary, Philadelphia, PA (1986)
- Master of Sacred Theology – New Testament [STM] – Lutheran Theological Seminary, Philadelphia, PA (1999)
- Doctor of Philosophy – Hermeneutics [Ph.D.] – Westminster Theological Seminary (2016)
- Doctor of Divinity [D.D.] (honorary) – Theological Commission of the Reformed Episcopal Church Sommerville, South Carolina (2008)
- Additional studies: Institute of Holy Land Studies: Jerusalem, Israel (1986) AND Widener University School of Law (1990).

== Early life and ministry ==
Hicks was born in Salem, New Jersey and was baptised at Salem United Presbyterian Church. "He was raised in a Christian family, and from the that he could read, he evidenced a deep love of the Scriptures" where he "dedicated himself" studying Scriptures in their original languages seeking to teach at either Bible College or a Seminary. In 1986, G. P. Mellick Belshaw, Bishop of the Episcopal Diocese (PECUSA; now TEC) confirmed Hicks at Trinity Episcopal Church located in Swedesboro, New Jersey. Hicks joined the Reformed Episcopal Church in 1990, joining Providence Chapel Reformed Episcopal Church in Mount Laurel, New Jersey. He was ordained as a deacon by Bishop Leonard W. Riches at Saint Paul's Reformed Episcopal, in Oreland, Pennsylvania. In 1994, Hicks was ordained as a Priest at Christ Reformed Episcopal Church, in Swedesboro, NJ. Hicks served as the Vicar and then Rector of Christ Church for four years.

During the time that spanned Hicks's confirmation, to him serving as vicar and then rector of Christ Church; he also a legislative aide to New Jersey Assemblyman Jack Collins, Speaker of the New Jersey General Assembly. While working in politics as a legislative aide, Hicks was able to "strengthen administrative and personnel skills, which [would become a] tremendous use to him at a later point in life." Life changed for Bishop Hicks, though, in 1995, when he became Rector of Saint Paul's, Oreland, PA, where he served for ten years. While serving at Saint Paul's Oreland he became canon to the Bishop Ordinary, Leonard W. Riches in 2000. In 2005, Hicks, was elected by the Diocese of the Northeast and Mid-Atlantic to be Leonard W. Riches’ Bishop Coadjutor. Hicks became a member of the College of Bishops for the Anglican Church in North America; in 2008 he became the Bishop Ordinary of the Diocese of the Northeast and Mid-Atlantic.

In 2019, Hicks was called by St. Peter's Anglican Church in the Anglican Diocese of Pittsburgh to be their next rector. He served as Bishop Ordinary of the Diocese of the Northeast and Mid-Atlantic until July 31, 2019, when he retired and became rector of St. Peter's on August 1, 2019. R. Charles Gillin, who served as Bishop Suffragan under Hicks, eventually was nominated and succeeded Hicks as Bishop Ordinary of the Diocese of the Northeast and Mid-Atlantic.

== Teaching career ==
Hicks has taught philosophy at Camden County College. He has taught Greek Elements and Greek Exegesis at the Reformed Episcopal Seminary from 1996, and was associate professor of Biblical Languages and Literature from 2005. He also taught hermeneutics, the Book of Common Prayer, and topics in other areas at the seminary. He became the Chancellor of the Reformed Episcopal Seminary in 2008 and served in that office as well as president from May 2009 until his retirement in 2019. He currently assists homeschooled children in his parish with Greek and other subjects during the COVID-19 pandemic.

=== Committee work ===
He has served on the following committees:

- Chairman of the Diocesan, Diocese of the Northeast and Mid-Atlantic, Nominations Committee
- Standing Committee for the Diocese of the Northeast and Mid-Atlantic
- Board of Examining Chaplains for the Diocese of the Northeast and Mid-Atlantic
- The Evangelism, Church Growth, and Development Committee for the Diocese of the Northeast and Mid-Atlantic
- The Bassinger Home Fund Committee
- Spiritual Growth and Nurture Committee
- Denominational Interchurch Relations Committee
- Nominations Committee
- Standing Liturgical Commission
- Prayer Book and Common Liturgy Task Force for the Anglican Church in North America
- Holy Orders Task Force for the Anglican Church in North America

==== Published works ====
Hicks's doctoral dissertation is published and on file at the library at the Reformed Episcopal Seminary.

Anglican Communion titles
Preceded by Leonard Riches	REC Bishop of the Northeast and Mid-Atlantic; 2008–2019	Succeeded by R. Charles Gillin
