= James Allen Latané =

Reformed Episcopal bishop (1831–1902)

The Right Reverend James Allen Latané
- Presiding Bishop of the Reformed Episcopal Church
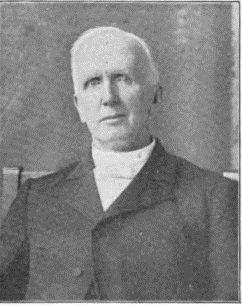
- Church: Reformed Episcopal Church
- Diocese: New York and Philadelphia Synod
- In office: 1883–1887, 1900–1902
- Predecessor: William Nicholson (first time); Charles E. Cheney (second time)
- Successor: Samuel Fallows
- Other posts: Bishop of the New York and Philadelphia Synod, 1901–1902

Orders
- Consecration: June 22, 1879 by William Nicholson

Personal details
- Born: January 15, 1831 Essex County, Virginia, United States
- Died: February 21, 1902 (aged 71) Baltimore, Maryland, United States
- Buried: Hollywood Cemetery, Richmond, Virginia
- Education: University of Virginia, Virginia Theological Seminary

James Allen Latané (January 15, 1831 – February 21, 1902) was an American Protestant priest who after the American Civil War became bishop and eventually Presiding Bishop of the Reformed Episcopal Church.

== Early and family life ==
Born in Essex County, Virginia to the former Susanna Allen (1797–1878) and her husband Henry Waring Latané (1782–1860), he received a private education appropriate to his class. In the 1850 federal census, his father Henry W. Latané reported owning 49 slaves in Essex County. As had at least his eldest brother, Dr. Thomas Latané (1824–1906), James Latané traveled to Charlottesville, Virginia for higher education, and graduated from the University of Virginia. He later traveled to Alexandria, Virginia for theological studies and graduated from the Virginia Theological Seminary.

In 1855, James Allen Latané married Mary Minor Holladay (1837–1922). Her lawyer father, John Z. Holladay (1806–1842), began representing Louisa County, Virginia in the Virginia House of Delegates about a year before his death of typhoid fever at Scottsville in Albemarle County. This happened when Mary was a girl, but her sisters both married into the First Families of Virginia. The couple would have two sons and at least six daughters, most of whom never married. His daughter Lucy Temple Latané wrote two books about her father and her family's history, "Parson Latané" (1936) and "James Allen Latané, A Short Sketch of James Allen Latané (1832-1902)."

== Career ==
Latané was ordained as an Episcopal priest. He served at a parish in Staunton, Virginia for more than a decade.

His father died in 1860, shortly before the American Civil War. As Virginia decided to secede from the Union in 1861, Dr. Thomas Latané and several of his brothers enlisted in the Confederate States Army. At least two of the brothers joined the Essex Light Dragoons of the 9th Virginia Cavalry. William Latané (1833–1862) became the only fatality of JEB Stuart's well-publicized raid around Union General McClellan's army during the Peninsular Campaign. John R. Thompson's poem about the event was published in Richmond, and painting about his interment in nearby Middlesex County, Virginia by William D. Washington became an important fundraiser during the conflict and eventually part of Lost Cause iconography. Lt. John Latané (1838–1864), who had also joined the Essex Light Dragoons of the 9th Virginia Cavalry, had arranged for his brother's burial, and himself died while imprisoned in Washington, D.C. and would be buried among the Confederate dead in Hollywood Cemetery in the state capitol. [His twin, Lewis Latané (1838–1864) also died that year and has at least a burial marker in the St. Paul's Episcopal Church cemetery in Miller's Corner in Essex County.] However, their brother Henry Waring Latané Jr. (1828–1892) was buried at the cemetery of the Reformed Episcopal Church at Miller's Corner founded by this brother, and the gravestone indicates he had served as senior warden of that new church.

In 1874, Latané was rector of historic St. Mathew's Episcopal Church in Wheeling, West Virginia, but decided to join the breakaway Reformed Episcopal Church. He was consecrated as a bishop of that church on June 22, 1879, in Philadelphia, and ultimately became that denomination's Presiding Bishop from May, 1900 until his death.

== Death and legacy ==
Latané and his wife are buried at Hollywood Cemetery in Richmond, Virginia. At least one daughter, Edith Latané, would remain with the Episcopal Church and helped found St. Margaret's School in Tappahannock in Essex County. That boarding school remains in operation today. The University of Virginia library holds many of the family's papers, including the book "James Allen Latané" by his daughter, Lucy Temple Latané.

== See also ==
- List of bishops of the Reformed Episcopal Church

Religious titles
Preceded by William Nicholson	Presiding Bishop of the Reformed Episcopal Church; 1883–1887	Succeeded by Charles Edward Cheney
Preceded by Samuel Fallows	Presiding Bishop of the Reformed Episcopal Church; 1900–1902	Succeeded by Samuel Fallows
Preceded by William Nicholson	Bishop Ordinary of the New York and Philadelphia Synod; 1901–1902	Succeeded by William T. Sabine
