= Diocese of the Northeast and Mid-Atlantic =

Reformed Episcopal church in the United States

REC Diocese of Northeast and Mid-Atlantic

Location
- Ecclesiastical province: Anglican Church in North America

Statistics
- Parishes: 24 (2025)
- Members: 913 (2025)

Information
- Rite: Anglican

Current leadership
- Bishop ordinary: William A. Jenkins Sr.

Website
- rec-nema.org

The Diocese of the Northeast and Mid-Atlantic, with the Convocation of Eastern Canada, formerly known as the New York and Philadelphia Synod, is a diocese of the Reformed Episcopal Church (REC). It was a founding jurisdiction of the REC in 1873 and, more recently, a founding diocese of the Anglican Church in North America in 2009. It encompasses states from Maryland and Pennsylvania north and east through New England, as well as all of eastern Canada. The diocese is home for the Reformed Episcopal Seminary in Oreland, Pennsylvania.

== History ==
The Reformed Episcopal Church of the United States, founded in 1873, was originally organized into synods. The New York and Philadelphia Synod, one of the REC's founding synods, was renamed the Diocese of the Northeast and Mid-Atlantic when the nomenclature was changed in 1984.

As part of the Reformed Episcopal Church, the Diocese of the Northeast and Mid-Atlantic took part in the Anglican realignment movement in the United States, being one of the founding dioceses of the Anglican Church in North America, in 2009.

== Looney-Hoffman Fund ==
The diocese administers the Looney-Hoffman Fund, established with the bulk of a $500,000 ($16.7 million in 2025) bequest in 1912 from Bishop Herman S. Hoffman in honor of his late wife, Eliza Looney Hoffman. The funds were intended to support the REC church growth and the construction of church buildings in Pennsylvania. The Looney-Hoffman Fund provided loans at nominal interest rates for new REC church buildings, provided the churches that borrowed money from the fund adhered to the resolution of the 1897 general council requiring the academic gown instead of choir dress. According to historian Allen C. Guelzo, "by dangling the prospect of unlimited free money in front of struggling parishes and vestries, Hoffman hoped to out-bid, rather than out-debate, the hapless partisans of cassock and surplice." As of 2026, the Looney-Hoffman Fund had nearly $5.9 million in assets, of which $2.6 million comprised loans to REC congregations.

== List of bishops ordinary ==
Bishops from 1873 to 1984 were bishops of the New York and Philadelphia synod; bishops from 1984 to the present have been bishops of the Diocese of the Northeast and Mid-Atlantic.

1. George David Cummins (1873–1876)
2. William R. Nicholson (1876–1901)
3. James Allen Latané (1901–1902)
4. William T. Sabine (1902–1913)
5. Robert Livingston Rudolph (1913–1930)
6. Robert Westly Peach (1930–1936)
7. William Culbertson III (1937–1942)
8. Howard David Higgins (1942–1972)
9. Theophilus Herter (1972–1984)
10. Leonard W. Riches (1984–2008)
11. David L. Hicks (2008–2019)
12. R. Charles Gillin (2019–2025)
13. William A. Jenkins Sr. (2025–present)

== Parishes ==
In 2025, the diocese had 24 congregations (one less than in 2022) with 913 members (down 26% from 2022) and 689 in average Sunday attendance (down 8% from 2022). It was one of just three ACNA dioceses (alongside the Diocese of South Carolina and the Diocese of All Nations) to report an attendance decline from 2022 to 2025. Notable parishes in the diocese include:

Church	Image	City	Year founded	Year completed	Notes
St. Alban's Church		New York City	1874	1877	Also known as the First Reformed Episcopal Church
Bishop Cummins Reformed Episcopal Church		Catonsville, Maryland	1874	1961	Founded as the Church of the Rock of Ages
Reformed Episcopal Church of the Atonement		Philadelphia, Pennsylvania	1875	1929	Founded as the Third Reformed Episcopal Church
Christ Memorial Reformed Episcopal Church		Philadelphia, Pennsylvania	1887	1888	Location of Reformed Episcopal Seminary campus, 1887–2001. Demolished 2018.
Grace Reformed Episcopal Church		Havre de Grace, Maryland	1910	1910	
