= Summerfield United Methodist Church =

- Summerfield United Methodist Church
- 43.0458°N 87.9024°W
- Location: 728 E Juneau Ave, Milwaukee, WI
- Country: United States
- Denomination: United Methodist Church
- Website: summerfieldchurch.org

History
- Founded: 1852

Architecture
- Style: Gothic architecture
- Years built: 1904

Clergy
- Pastor: Rev. Jennifer Emert

Summerfield United Methodist Church is located in the historic Juneautown (East Town) neighborhood of downtown Milwaukee, Wisconsin. Part of the United Methodist Church (UMC), Summerfield has established several community missions and promotes social justice.

== History ==
Summerfield's congregation formed in 1852. By 1857 the congregation had moved to Biddle Street (now Kilbourn Avenue) and Van Buren Street and was named Summerfield in honor of John Summerfield, an Irish Methodist preacher.

In 1854 members of the Summerfield congregation joined with the abolitionist Sherman Booth and broke into a Milwaukee jail to free escaped slave Joshua Glover.

From 1865 to 1868, Samuel Fallows was pastor. He had served as a colonel and brevetted brigadier general during the Civil War. His wife, Lucy Bethia Huntington, helped to establish the Soldiers Aid Society and was a patron of Milwaukee's Old Soldier Home.

Milwaukee Protestant Home was established at the church's location in 1884 and Methodist Manor in 1890.

The current church building was constructed in 1904 on the corner of Cass Street and Juneau Avenue for First Community Church. The Gothic style church, with its 73-foot-tall (22 m) bell tower, was built using sandstone and limestone.

In 1869, the first Women's Foreign Missionary Society in Milwaukee and Wisconsin, and the second in the United States, was organized at Summerfield. This later evolved into the United Methodist Women.

On October 6, 1919, Goodwill Industries of Wisconsin was founded in the basement of Summerfield.

Summerfield merged with First Community Church in 1929 and the combined congregation then occupied the church.

The church retains the original stained glass medallions from 1856 used in the Biddle Street location windows. These are among the oldest surviving works of stained glass in the state.

Summerfield remains the oldest Methodist congregation in Wisconsin.

On January 19, 2014 the congregation of Fe Hispanic Ministry UMC began sharing worship space at Summerfield, bringing services in Spanish to the church.
