= Leonard W. Riches =

American Anglican bishop (1939–2024)

The Most Reverend Leonard W. Riches
- Presiding Bishop of the Reformed Episcopal Church
- Church: Reformed Episcopal Church
- Diocese: Diocese of the Northeast and Mid-Atlantic
- In office: 1996–2014
- Predecessor: Franklin Sellers
- Successor: Royal U. Grote Jr.
- Previous post(s): Bishop of the Northeast and Mid-Atlantic (1984–2008)

Orders
- Ordination: 1965 by Howard David Higgins
- Consecration: June 1975

Personal details
- Born: March 21, 1939; Philadelphia, Pennsylvania, U.S.
- Died: December 29, 2024 (aged 85); Doylestown, Pennsylvania, U.S.

Leonard Wayne Riches Sr. (March 21, 1939 – December 29, 2024) was an American Anglican bishop. He served as presiding bishop of the Reformed Episcopal Church from 1996 to June 2014, and was previously the bishop of the Diocese of the Northeast and Mid-Atlantic in this church, which was a founding jurisdiction of the Anglican Church in North America. He married his wife, Barbara, in 1964, and they had two grown sons, Leonard W. Riches Jr. and Jonathan S. Riches.

== Life and ministry ==
Riches was born in Philadelphia. He was baptized at St. Bartholomew's Episcopal Church as a child and later joined the Reformed Episcopal Church with his family in 1946, when they entered the Memorial Church of Our Redeemer in his home city. The Riches family later joined Calvary Reformed Episcopal Church in Philadelphia under the pastorate of William Jerdan Jr., who also went on to become a presiding bishop of the Reformed Episcopal Church. Riches graduated cum laude at Princeton University with a Bachelor of Arts degree in English literature in 1961. He earned his Master of Divinity degree from the Theological Seminary of the Reformed Episcopal Church, otherwise known as the Reformed Episcopal Seminary, in 1964. He continued advanced graduate work at the Lutheran Theological Seminary at Philadelphia, completing all the course work toward an STM. He then devoted his time to pastoral ministry and teaching at the Reformed Episcopal Seminary at the request of Robert K. Rudolph. Riches was awarded honorary Doctor of Divinity degrees by the Reformed Episcopal Seminary in 1976 and by Cranmer Theological House in 1997.

Riches was ordained a deacon in 1964 and a presbyter in 1965. For the next 18 years he would be rector of three Reformed Episcopal Church parishes, St. Luke's Church in Philadelphia, the First Reformed Episcopal Church in New York, and St. Mark's Church in Jenkintown, Pennsylvania. In 1974 he was elected bishop of the Diocese of the Northeast and the Mid-Atlantic, being consecrated in June 1975 at the First Episcopal Reformed Church in New York, as assistant bishop. He would be later elected bishop co-adjutor. He was bishop ordinary of the Diocese of the Northeast and the Mid-Atlantic from 1984 to November 2008. He was first elected presiding bishop of the General Council of the Reformed Episcopal Church in 1996, being reelected in 1999, 2002, 2005, 2008, and 2011.

Riches worked at Reformed Episcopal Seminary from 1965 until 2015. He was appointed to the rank of lecturer at the seminary in 1965, eventually becoming professor of liturgics and theology. He was named professor emeritus of liturgics and theology and retired from Reformed Episcopal Seminary in 2015 after serving there for fifty years. He served as the seminary's president from 1982 to 1990. He then served as chancellor of the seminary until his retirement from that position in 2008. He was also a visiting professor at Cranmer Theological House and at the Sangre de Cristo Seminary in Westcliffe, Colorado.

Riches was moderator of the Federation of Anglican Churches in the Americas from January 2006 to April 2008. The Reformed Episcopal Church took part in the Anglican realignment movement in the United States, being a founding entity of the Anglican Church in North America in June 2009. He also served as chairman of the board of Anglicans United.

Riches died from cancer on December 29, 2024, at the age of 85.

Religious titles
Preceded by Franklin Sellers	Presiding Bishop of the Reformed Episcopal Church; 1996–2014	Succeeded by Royal U. Grote Jr.
Preceded by Theophilus Herter	Bishop Ordinary of the Northeast and Mid-Atlantic; 1984–2008	Succeeded by David L. Hicks
