= Howard David Higgins =

The Right Reverend Howard D. Higgins D.D.
- Presiding Bishop of the Reformed Episcopal Church
- Church: Reformed Episcopal Church
- Diocese: New York and Philadelphia Synod
- In office: 1957–1975
- Predecessor: Joseph E. Kearney
- Successor: Theophilus Herter
- Other posts: Bishop ordinary of the New York and Philadelphia Synod (1942–1972); Rector of First Reformed Episcopal Church (1927–1954)

Orders
- Ordination: November 28, 1924 (diaconate); October 30, 1925 (priesthood) by Robert Livingston Rudolph (diaconate); Robert Westly Peach (priesthood)
- Consecration: January 19, 1937 by Joseph E. Kearney

Personal details
- Born: August 23, 1903 New York City
- Died: April 6, 1980 (aged 76) Southampton, Pennsylvania

Howard David Higgins (August 23, 1903 — April 6, 1980) was a bishop of the Reformed Episcopal Church in the mid-twentieth century. He also served as Professor of Church History at the Theological Seminary of the Reformed Episcopal Church in Philadelphia from 1930 until his retirement in 1972, and editor of the Episcopal Recorder from 1937 until his death. Higgins was well respected for his faithfulness to the Bible and his friendly demeanor and collaborative leadership style.

== Biography ==
Higgins was born in New York City in 1903 to Peter David Higgins and his wife Emma Howard Higgins. He was a boyhood friend of Robert Knight Rudolph, and beginning at the age of sixteen he often visited the Rudolphs in their summer home in Dorset, VT, where Higgins enjoyed listening to Rudolph’s father, Bishop Robert Livingston Rudolph talk about the founding and early history of the Reformed Episcopal Church. The Higgins family at the time were members of First Reformed Episcopal Church in New York, pastored by Dr. William T. Sabine, who later became a bishop himself. Higgins married Ethel Scott in 1944.

=== Education ===
Higgins graduated from the Theological Seminary of the Reformed Episcopal Church with a diploma in 1924. When he received his undergraduate degree from Columbia University three years later, he exchanged his seminary diploma for a Bachelor of Divinity. He then continued his education at Princeton Theological Seminary, where he received a Master of Theology degree in 1928. In 1938, he was awarded a master's degree from Columbia. Reformed Episcopal Seminary awarded him an honorary Doctor of Divinity the following year.

=== Ordination ===
Higgins was ordained deacon on November 28, 1924, by Bishop Rudolph and presbyter on October 30, 1925, by Bishop Robert Westly Peach. He was consecrated bishop on January 19, 1937, serving first as the assistant bishop of the New York and Philadelphia synod. In October of the same year he was made coadjutor at the request of Bishop William Culbertson. When Culbertson resigned in 1942 to accept a position teaching at Moody Bible Institute, Higgins became the bishop of the synod. At 33, he was the youngest bishop in the United States at the time of his consecration. In 1957, he was elected as the president and presiding bishop of the denomination, a position to which he was re-elected in 1963.

=== Seminary professor ===
Higgins’ teaching career at the seminary begin in 1930 with the death of Bishop Rudolph. At first, he taught Systematic theology, Biblical ethics and English Bible. Upon the retirement of Bishop Peach in 1937, he took the Chair of Church History, which he occupied until his retirement.

Higgins was memorialized by a fellow bishop of the church, Theophilus J. Herter, with these words: "All through the thirty-five years of his active service as bishop he followed the exhortation given him at his consecration: ‘Be to the flock of Christ a shepherd, not a wolf; feed them, devour them not. Hold up the weak, heal the sick, bind up the broken, bring again the outcasts, seek the lost. Be so merciful that you be not too remiss; so minister discipline, that you forget not mercy."

== Sources ==
- Raymond A. Acker, A History of the Reformed Episcopal Seminary 1886–1964 (Phila.: Theological Seminary of the Reformed Episcopal Church, 1965).
- Robert K. Rudolph, "Howard David Higgins" in Episcopal Recorder (July 1980), pp. 5ff.
- Theophilus J. Herter, "A Faithful Steward" in Episcopal Recorder (July 1980), p. 21.

Religious titles
Preceded by William Culbertson III	Bishop Ordinary of the New York and Philadelphia Synod; 1942–1972	Succeeded by Theophilus Herter
Preceded by Joseph Edgar Kearney	Presiding Bishop of the Reformed Episcopal Church; 1957–1975	Succeeded by Theophilus Herter
