= Reformed Episcopal Church of the Atonement =

Historic Reformed Episcopal Church in Philadelphia

Coordinates: 40°02′15″N 75°10′56″W

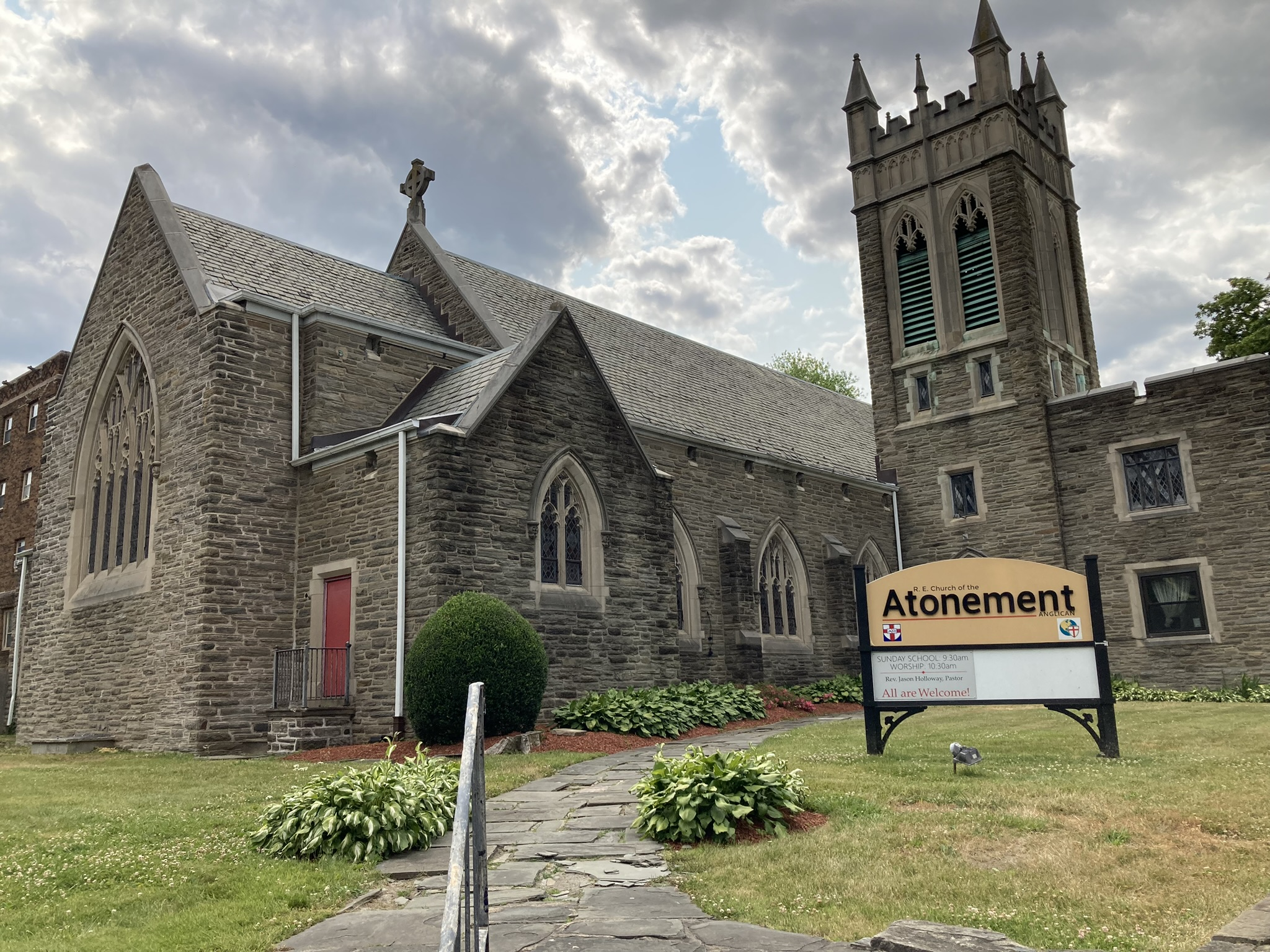
- Reformed Episcopal Church of the Atonement
- Location: Philadelphia, Pennsylvania
- Country: United States
- Denomination: Anglican Church in North America; Reformed Episcopal Church
- Website: recatonement.org

History
- Founded: 1875

Architecture
- Style: Gothic Revival
- Years built: 1929

Administration
- Diocese: Northeast and Mid-Atlantic

Clergy
- Rector: The Rev. Jason Holloway
- Reformed Episcopal Church of the Atonement
- U.S. Historic district – Contributing property
- Part of: Tulpehocken Station Historic District (ID85003564)
- Added to NRHP: November 26, 1985

The Reformed Episcopal Church of the Atonement is a historic church in the Germantown neighborhood of Philadelphia. It is a parish of the Reformed Episcopal Church's Diocese of the Northeast and Mid-Atlantic and a contributing property to the Tulpehocken Station Historic District.

While the current building (designed by Norman A. Hulme) dates to 1929, the church was founded in 1875 as the Third Reformed Episcopal Church. It took its current name by 1894. Two former pastors of the church, William Culbertson III and Willie Hill (bishop), later became bishops of the Reformed Episcopal Church. Rev Daniel M Stearns also served a notable 28-year pastorate with this congregation.
