= Samuel Fallows =

19th century English American minister

The Right Reverend Samuel Fallows D.D.
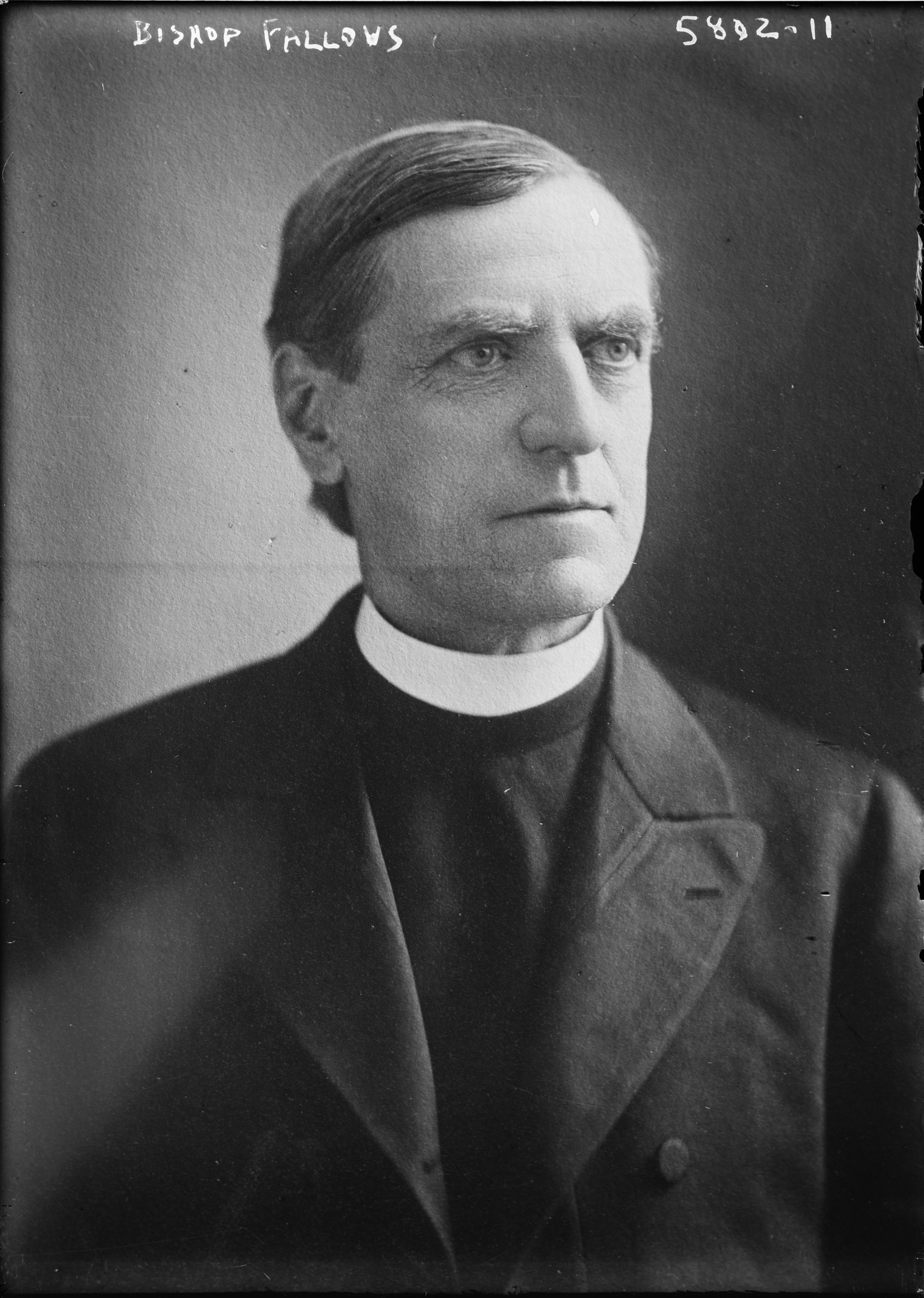
- Fallows in 1922, shortly before his death

9th Superintendent of Public Instruction of Wisconsin
- In office July 6, 1870 – January 4, 1874
- Appointed by: Lucius Fairchild
- Governor: Lucius Fairchild; Cadwallader C. Washburn
- Preceded by: Alexander J. Craig
- Succeeded by: Edward Searing

Personal details
- Born: December 13, 1835 Pendleton, England
- Died: September 5, 1922 (aged 86) Chicago, Illinois, U.S.
- Resting place: Forest Home Cemetery, Chicago
- Spouse: Lucy Bethia Huntington (m. 1860; died 1916)
- Children: 4
- Education: Lawrence University (D.D.)
- Alma mater: University of Wisconsin
- Occupation: Clergyman, educator, lecturer, author

Military service
- Allegiance: United States
- Branch/service: United States Volunteers; Union Army
- Years of service: 1861–1865
- Rank: Colonel, USV; Brevet Brig. Gen., USV
- Commands: 49th Reg. Wis. Vol. Infantry
- Battles/wars: American Civil War

Samuel Fallows (December 13, 1835 – September 5, 1922) was an English American immigrant, minister, lecturer, and author. He was the 9th Superintendent of Public Instruction of Wisconsin and served as Presiding Bishop of the Reformed Episcopal Church for 30 years between 1877 and 1922. During the American Civil War he served as a chaplain and later as an officer in the Union Army, receiving an honorary brevet to Brigadier General after the war.

== Early life ==
Fallows was born in Pendleton, Greater Manchester, in England, and emigrated to the Wisconsin Territory as a child in 1848. His family settled at Marshall (then called "Bird's Ruins") in eastern Dane County, and established a farm. He worked as a farm hand to pay for school, becoming a Methodist minister in 1858 and graduating from the University of Wisconsin (now University of Wisconsin–Madison) in 1859. He was elected vice-president and principal of Galesburg University and served there for two years, then became minister of the Methodist Episcopal Church in Oshkosh, Wisconsin. (Note: Eicher, 2001, p. 231 states that Fallows became a lecturer at and vice president of Galesburg University in 1859. An internet biography of a North Dakota governor from the early 1900s indicates there was a Galesburg University at Galesburg, Wisconsin, a small town now known as Navarino, Wisconsin, from 1853 until 1930, but research for this article yielded no other information about this school.)

== Civil War service ==
=== 32nd Wisconsin Volunteers ===
Fallows was ministering to the Oshkosh church at the time of the outbreak of the American Civil War and did not volunteer in the first year of the war. In 1862, however, he resigned his ministry and enlisted for service in the Union Army, becoming chaplain of the 32nd Wisconsin Infantry Regiment under Colonel James Henry Howe. He served for a year with the regiment which mostly performed guard duty during that time to protect supplies and logistics along the Mississippi River in the Western Theater of the American Civil War. He resigned due to poor health on June 29, 1863.

=== 40th Wisconsin Volunteers ===
He returned to his ministry in Wisconsin, this time at Appleton, Wisconsin, and was also elected professor of natural science at Lawrence University, in Appleton. As his health recovered, so to did his fervor to fight for the Union, and, in early 1864, he helped to raise a number of volunteers for the 40th Wisconsin Infantry Regiment—called the "Normal Regiment" due to the large number of teachers and students in the unit—and was selected as the regiment's lieutenant colonel. The regiment was assigned mostly to the defense of Memphis, Tennessee, and was engaged in the defense of Memphis during the raid known as the Second Battle of Memphis, carried out by Confederate cavalry under General Nathan Bedford Forrest on August 21, 1864.

=== 49th Wisconsin Volunteers ===
In January 1865, Lt. Colonel Fallows was promoted to colonel and appointed to the organization of a new regiment in Madison, Wisconsin, which became the 49th Wisconsin Infantry Regiment. The 49th Wisconsin mustered into service on March 8, 1865, and proceeded to St. Louis and then to Rolla, Missouri, where they engaged in guard duty through the end of the war. Colonel Fallows mustered out November 1, 1865.

=== Brevet to brigadier general ===
On January 13, 1866, U.S. President Andrew Johnson nominated Colonel Fallows for a brevet to brigadier general of volunteers in recognition for his service. The United States Senate confirmed the brevet on March 12, 1866, and the rank was made effective retroactive to October 24, 1865.

== Postbellum years ==
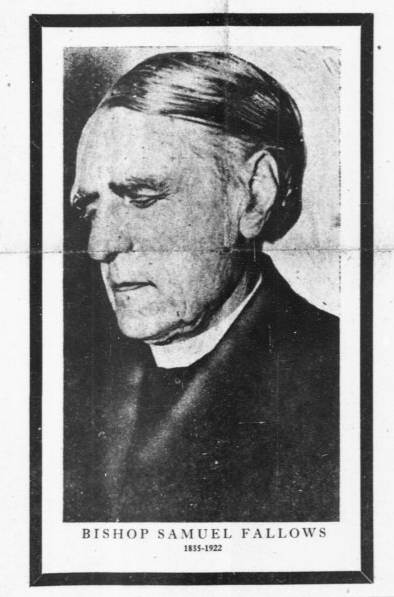
Samuel Fallows's memorial article in The Broad Ax newspaper, September 30, 1922

Colonel Fallows returned to his ministry after the war and was a pastor for two of the largest churches in Milwaukee, including three years (1865–1868) as pastor of Summerfield United Methodist Church. In 1866, Fallows was appointed to the University of Wisconsin Board of Regents by Governor Lucius Fairchild, serving until 1874. In 1870, when the State Superintendent of Public Instruction Alexander J. Craig died in office, Fairchild appointed Fallows to fill that position. Fallows was subsequently elected in a special election for the remainder of the term in 1870 and re-elected to a full term in 1871, leaving office in January 1874. While serving as Superintendent, Fallows earned his Doctorate of Divinity (D.D.) from Lawrence University in Appleton. Throughout his postwar career, he was a public figure notable for his efforts in public education, prison reform, labor rights, and the temperance movement.

In 1874, he moved to Bloomington, Illinois, and was appointed President of Illinois Wesleyan University. The following year he joined the newly organized Reformed Episcopal Church and moved to Chicago, where he became Rector of St. Paul's Reformed Episcopal Church. In 1876, he became editor of the Appeal, the magazine of the church, and later that year, on July 15, he was elected Presiding Bishop of the new church. He subsequently served in that role for 30 of the next 50 years. In 1883, he published a thesaurus.

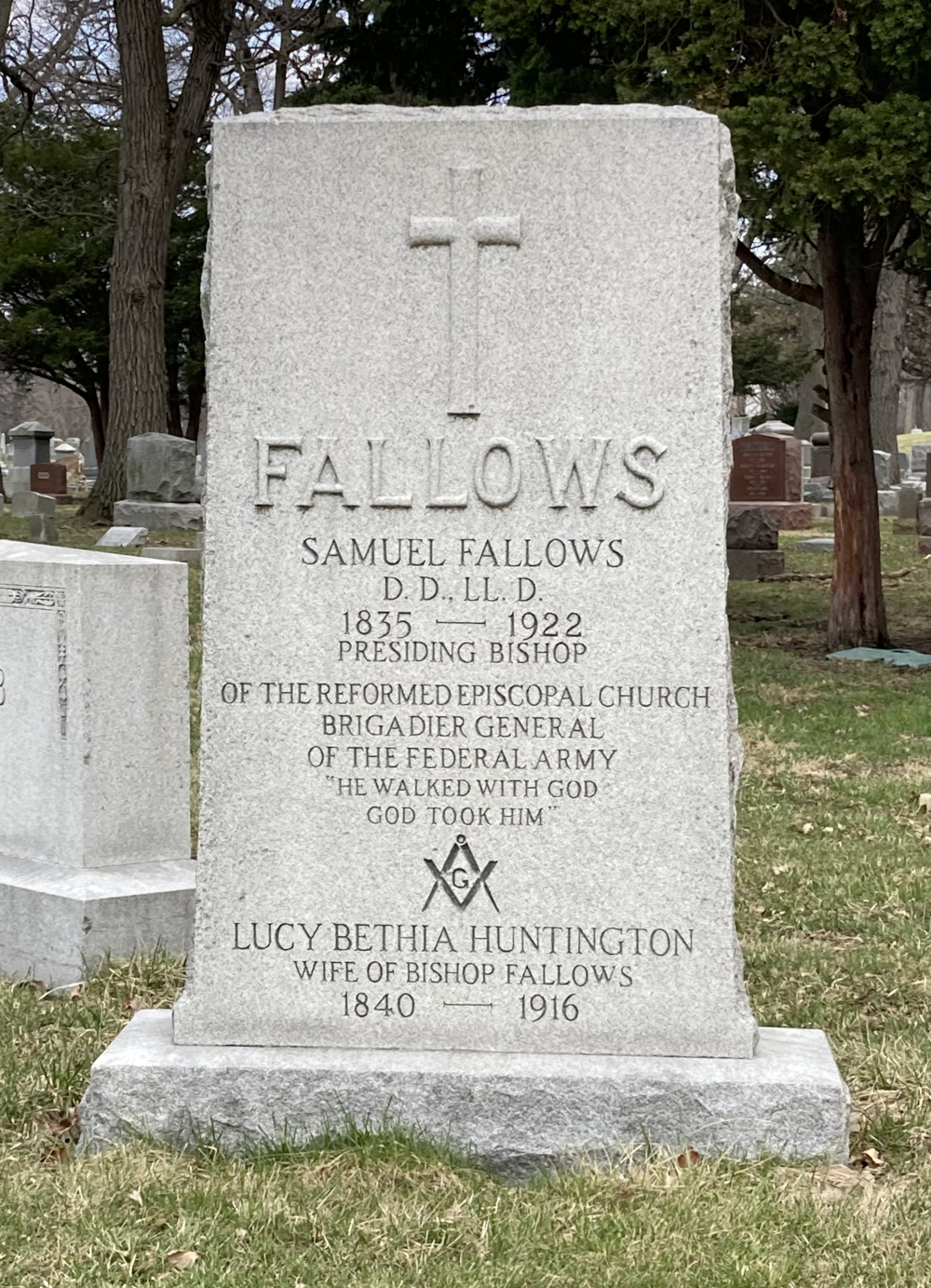
Monument at Forest Home Cemetery

After his service in the war, Colonel Fallows became a companion of the Illinois Commandery of the Military Order of the Loyal Legion of the United States and was the chaplain of the Grand Army of the Republic. He also served as chaplain at the dedication of the Lincoln Memorial in Washington, D.C., just months before his own death in 1922.

Fallows died after a bad case of influenza at his home in Chicago on September 5, 1922, with his daughter Alice at his bedside. He was cremated and his remains were sent to Massachusetts to be interred alongside his wife, Lucy, who had died in 1916. A memorial was erected to Fallows and his wife at Forest Home Cemetery, in Forest Park, Illinois. At the time of his death, he was the oldest living alumni of the University of Wisconsin.

== Personal life and family ==
In 1860, Reverend Fallows married Lucy Bethia Huntington, a niece of Reverend Frederic Dan Huntington, of Massachusetts. Lucy died in 1916. They had at least four children together:

- Edward Huntington Fallows, an attorney who lived in New York
- Major Charles Samuel Fallows, lawyer, Saratoga, California
- Mrs. Helen Mayer Williams of San Francisco
- Alice Katherine Fallows

== Electoral history ==
Wisconsin Superintendent of Public Instruction Election, 1870
Party	Candidate	Votes	%	±%
General Election, November 8, 1870
Republican	Samuel Fallows (incumbent)	77,928	53.07%	−0.65%
Democratic	Harvey B. Dale	68,903	46.93%	
Plurality		9,025	6.15%	-1.29%
Total votes		146,831	100.0%	+12.49%
Republican hold				

Wisconsin Superintendent of Public Instruction Election, 1871
Party	Candidate	Votes	%	±%
General Election, November 7, 1871
Republican	Samuel Fallows (incumbent)	78,502	53.36%	+0.29%
Democratic	Warren D. Parker	68,614	46.64%	
Plurality		9,888	6.72%	+0.57%
Total votes		147,116	100.0%	+0.19%
Republican hold				

== See also ==
- List of bishops of the Reformed Episcopal Church

== Notes ==
Military offices
Regiment established	Command of the 49th Wisconsin Infantry Regiment; January 28, 1865 – November 1, 1865	Succeeded by Edward Colman
Party political offices
Preceded by Alexander J. Craig	Republican nominee for Superintendent of Public Instruction of Wisconsin; 1870, 1871	Succeeded by Robert Graham
Political offices
Preceded by Alexander J. Craig	Superintendent of Public Instruction of Wisconsin; July 6, 1870 – January 4, 1874	Succeeded by Edward Searing
Religious titles
Preceded by Charles E. Cheney	Presiding Bishop of the Reformed Episcopal Church; 1877–1879	Succeeded by William R. Nicholson
Preceded by Charles E. Cheney	Presiding Bishop of the Reformed Episcopal Church; 1889–1894	Succeeded by Thomas W. Campbell
Preceded by Thomas W. Campbell	Presiding Bishop of the Reformed Episcopal Church; 1897–1900	Succeeded by James Allen Latané
Preceded by James Allen Latané	Presiding Bishop of the Reformed Episcopal Church; 1902–1922	Succeeded by Robert Livingston Rudolph
Preceded by Charles E. Cheney	Bishop Ordinary of the Synod of Chicago; 1916–1922	Succeeded by Robert Livingston Rudolph
