= Edward Searing =

American educator (1835–1898)

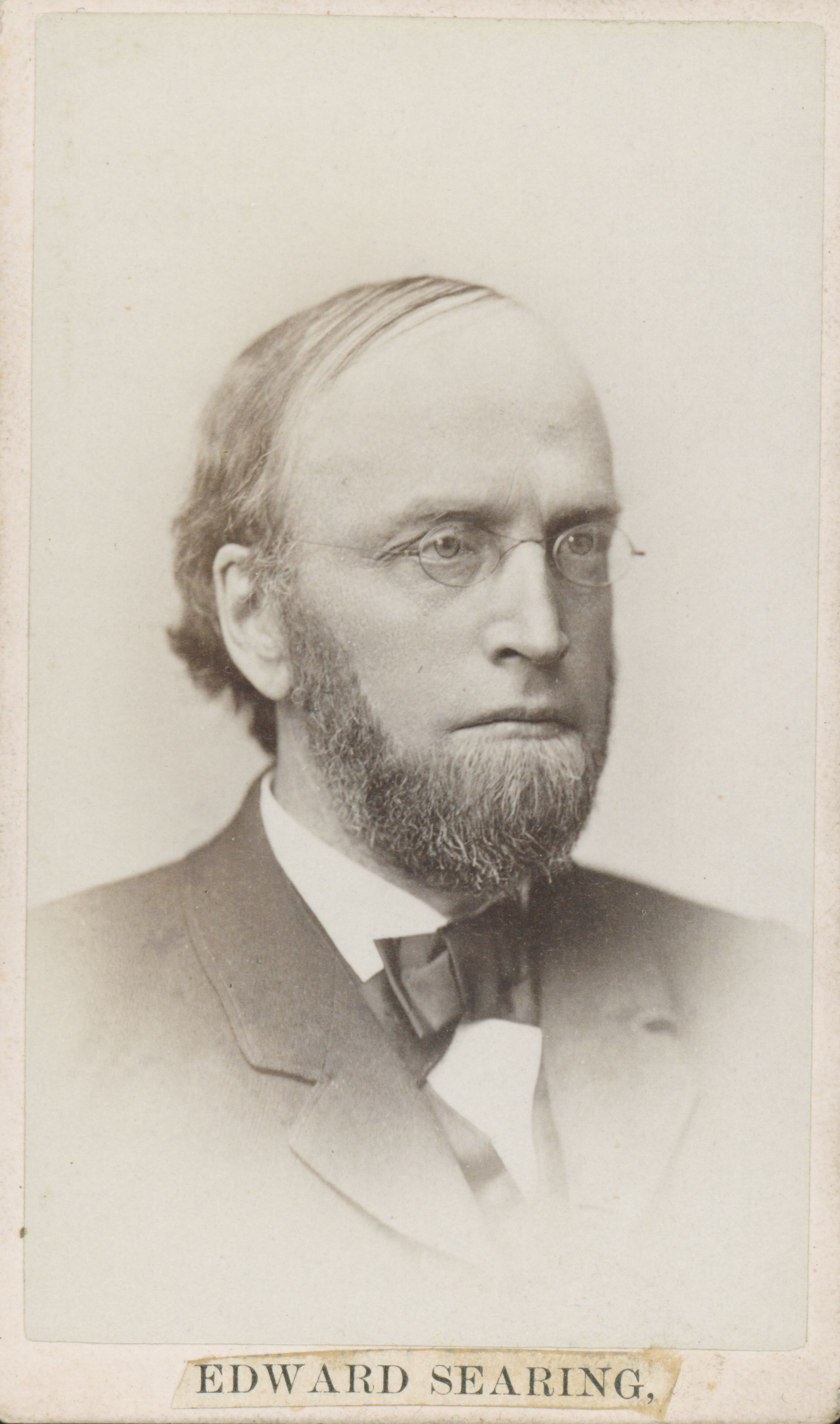

10th Superintendent of Public Instruction of Wisconsin
- In office January 4, 1874 – January 7, 1878
- Preceded by: Samuel Fallows
- Succeeded by: William Clarke Whitford

Personal details
- Born: July 14, 1835 Aurora, Cayuga County, New York, U.S.
- Died: October 22, 1898 (aged 63) Saint Paul, Minnesota, U.S.
- Party: Liberal Republican
- Education: University of Michigan
- Occupation: Educator

Edward Searing (July 14, 1835 – October 22, 1898) was an American educator.

Born in Aurora, New York, in Cayuga County, New York, Searing received his bachelor's and master's degrees from the University of Michigan in 1861 and 1864, respectively. In 1857, he moved to Wisconsin and taught school. Searing then moved to Milton, Wisconsin, in 1863 and became a professor at Milton College. Searing was elected Superintendent of Public Instruction of Wisconsin and served from 1874 to 1878. In 1880. Searing moved to Mankato, Minnesota, and became the first President of the Mankato Normal School now Minnesota State University, Mankato. Searing died in Saint Paul, Minnesota, on October 22, 1898, while at a normal school board meeting.
