= Reformed Episcopal Seminary =

Theological seminary in Pennsylvania, U.S.

Coordinates: 40.102148°N 75.182650°W

- The Theological Seminary of the Reformed Episcopal Church
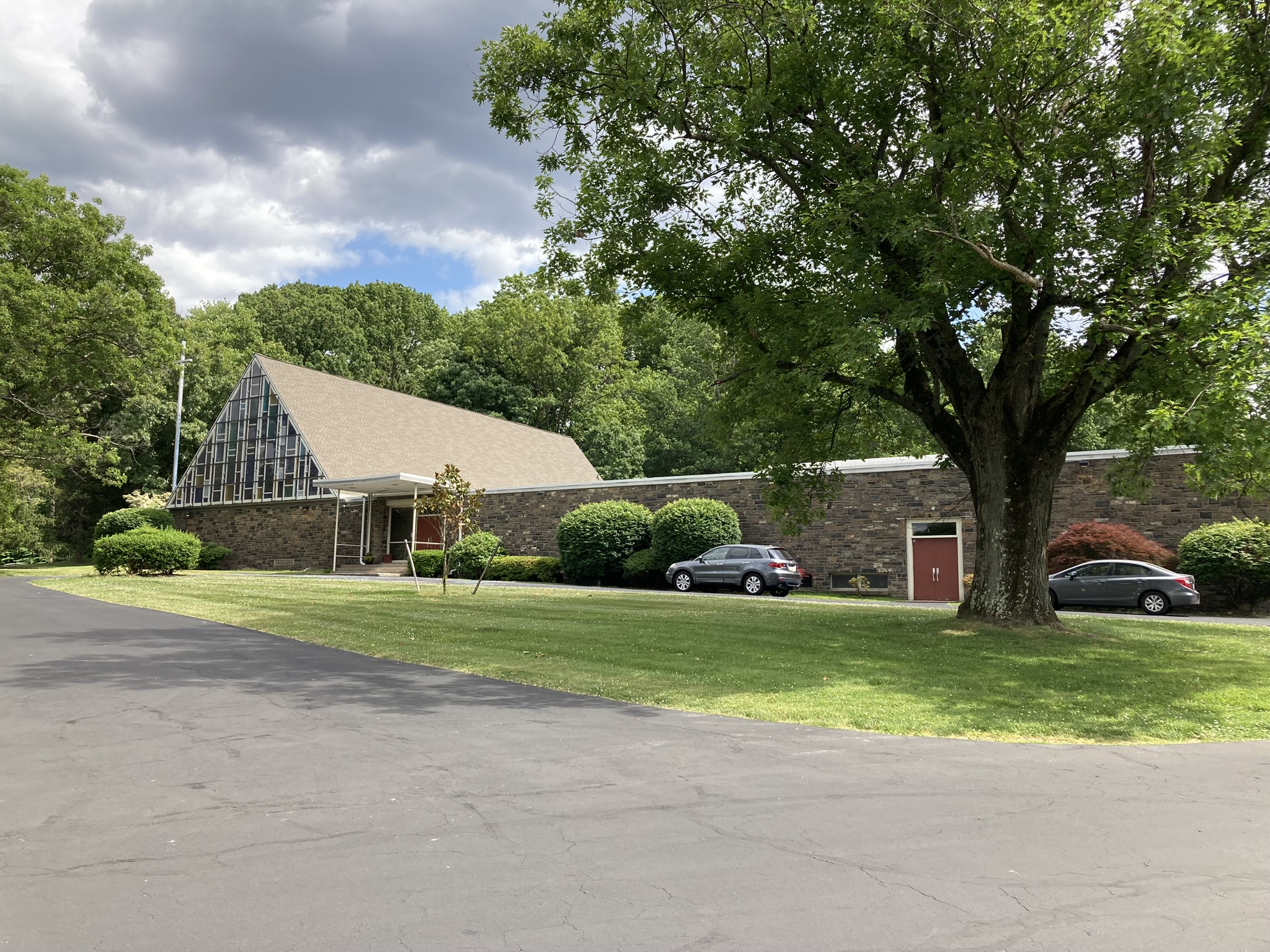
- The RES campus at St. Paul's REC in Oreland, Pennsylvania
- Motto: We are ambitious to be well-pleasing unto Him
- Type: Private seminary
- Established: 1887
- Affiliations: Theological Commission of the Reformed Episcopal Church, Association of Theological Schools, Anglican Church in North America
- Religious affiliation: Reformed Episcopal Church
- President and dean: Matthew Harrington
- Students: 21
- Location: Oreland, Pennsylvania, United States
- Colors: Grey, blue
- Nickname: RES
- Website: reseminary.edu
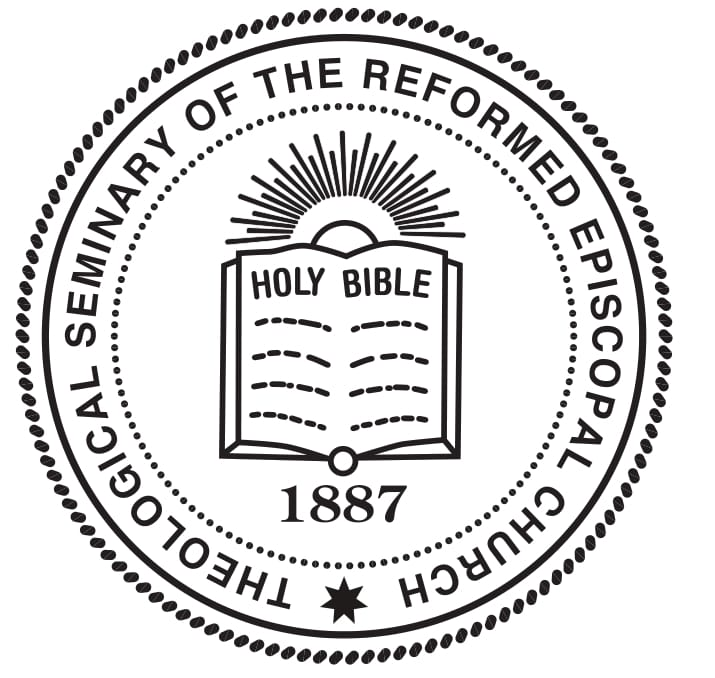

The Reformed Episcopal Seminary is a private seminary in Oreland, Pennsylvania. It was founded in 1887 as the first seminary of the Reformed Episcopal Church.

== History ==
The Reformed Episcopal Seminary was founded in 1887 in West Philadelphia, Pennsylvania, as the "Theological Seminary of the Reformed Episcopal Church", its chartered and legal name. The seminary was established based on the pledge of a trust created by Harriet Benson in March 1886. The corner stone for the first building to house the seminary was laid on September 19, 1886. The seminary began meeting for classes in 1886 under the tutelage of Bishop William Nicholson in his residence. It opened the doors to its first class of students on September 30, 1887, in its new building in West Philadelphia, Pennsylvania, as the seminary of the Reformed Episcopal Church, after the trust was received on March 16, 1887.

The Reformed Episcopal Seminary upholds the doctrinal statement adopted by the Reformed Episcopal Church. The doctrinal statement includes the Thirty-Nine Articles, the historic creeds, the historic Book of Common Prayer, and the Declaration of Principles. The term "Reformed" has various meanings within the larger Christian community. For example, Presbyterians have expressed the reformed faith in the Westminster Confession of Faith, while Reformed Baptists have commonly expressed the reformed faith in the 1689 London Baptist Confession of Faith. The Reformed Episcopal Church was founded on the Thirty-Nine Articles as they express a summary of the necessary doctrines that brought about reformation in the Church of England. The founders of the Reformed Episcopal Church originally spell the name of the church as Re-formed, referring to the idea that it was the Re-organized Episcopal Church taken back to its historic faith. While later statements of faith have expanded and added to the doctrines expressed in the Articles, the Thirty-Nine Articles represent the necessary doctrine that defines the Protestant position against the Roman Catholic position of that period, and in unity with the reformations taking place elsewhere in Europe.

"Once in the early days our Church was referred to as the 'Primitive Episcopal Church,' and the name seems to fit its mission. The word 'Primitive' shows that it is a restoration, going back not only to the days of our country's early history, but back to the Reformation, when the fires of martyrdom and the horrors of torture could not drive away from the truth those who held it in their keeping; back still farther to the days of the apostles; aye back farther yet, to the teaching of Him who, beside the blue waters of Galilee, called followers into His service, that He might make them "fishers of men."

== Administration ==
Until 1982, the chief institutional officer of the seminary was the dean. Since then the primary institutional officers have been the president and the dean.

| Dean | Years | President | Years |
|---|---|---|---|
| William Nicholson | 1886–1901 | | |
| J. Howard-Smith | 1901–1903 | | |
| Joseph Dawson Wilson (Chairman of the Faculty) | 1903–1924 | | |
| Robert L. Rudolph | 1924–1930 | | |
| Robert Westly Peach | 1930–1936 | Milton C. Fisher | 1975–1982 |
| George Handy Wailes | 1936–1959 | Leonard W. Riches, Sr. | 1982–1990 |
| Fred C. Kuehner | 1959–1975 | David E. Schroeder | 1990–1991 |
| Milton C. Fisher | 1975–1987 | Ray R. Sutton | 1991–1995 |
| Allen C. Guelzo | 1987–1991 | Leonard W. Riches, Sr. | 1995–1998 |
| David P. Kletzing | 1991–1996 | Wayne A. Headman | 1998–2009 |
| Jon W. Abboud | 1997–2012 | David L. Hicks | 2009–2019 |
| Jonathan S. Riches | 2012–2023 | Jonathan S. Riches | 2019–2023 |
| Matthew Harrington | | | 2023–present |

== Campuses ==
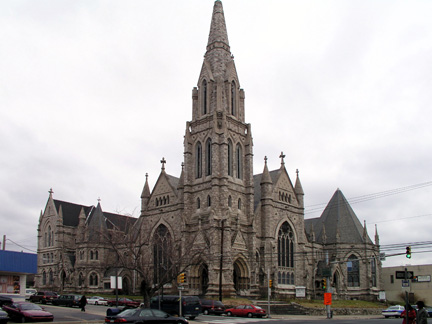
Former West Philadelphia Campus

The first campus, which was built in 1887, was located at 43rd and Chestnut (West Philadelphia, Pennsylvania). The building served as both the denominational cathedral and the seminary. In the 1980s, the seminary acquired the property next to the building, conducting most of its operations there while continuing to use the dormitory and worship space in the original building. The denominational cathedral, Christ Memorial REC, continued to use the original building for its congregation and a grade school. In an effort to adapt to changes in its student body throughout the 1990s (including an increase in second vocation night students), the seminary moved its classes and library to a church in Roxborough, Pennsylvania, which dramatically reduced the costs of maintaining and protecting the property. The church continued to use the original building and maintained partial ownership of the building.

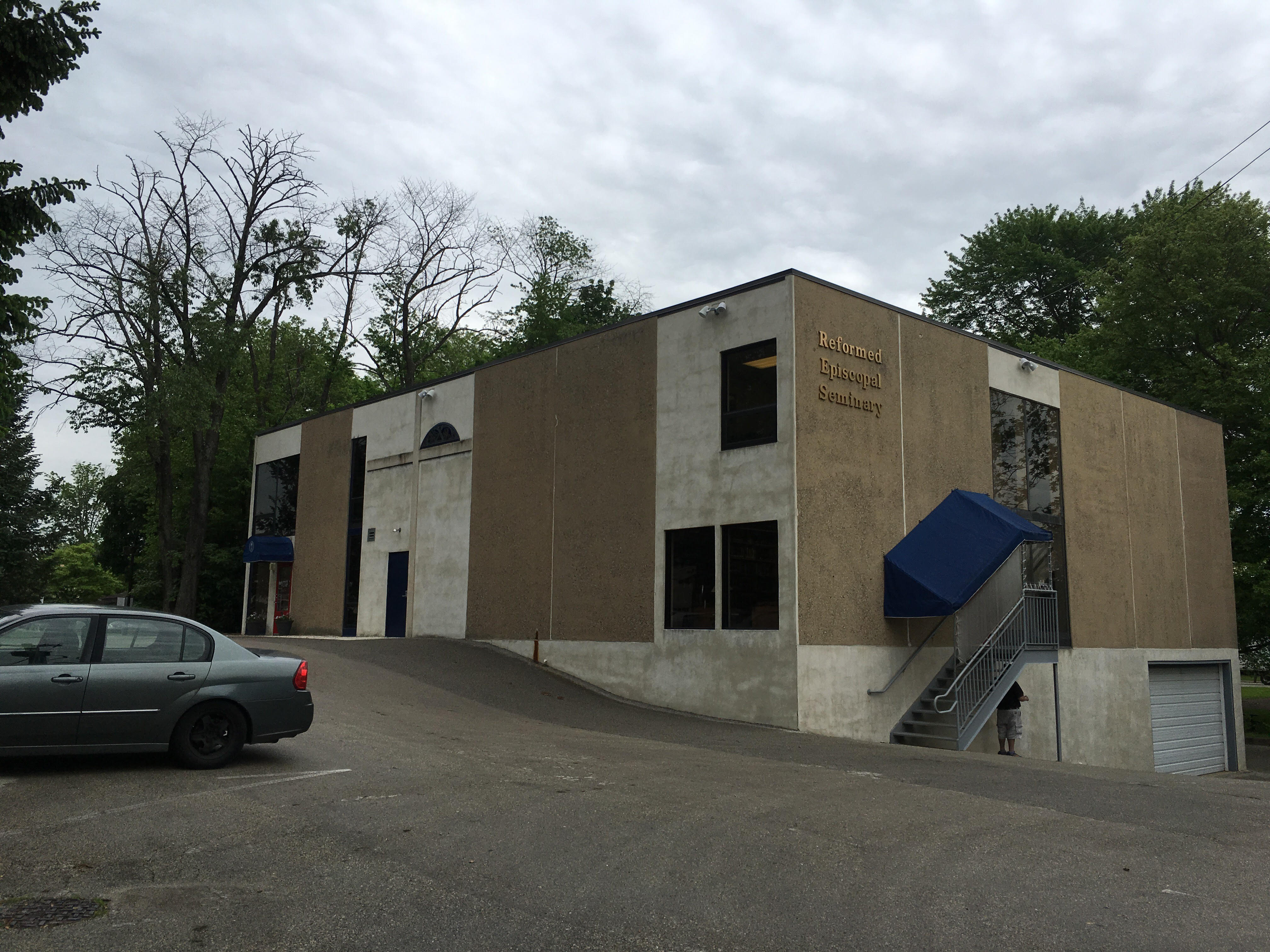
The main seminary building in Blue Bell, which housed the chapel, the library, professors' offices, and classrooms.

In 2001 the seminary built its own campus in Blue Bell, Pennsylvania. In 2004 the steeple of Christ Memorial Church was struck by lightning and severely damaged the building. After a two-year court battle with the insurance company, the church and seminary won some settlement money, but not enough to rebuild the structures. The building was sold to a developer and it was later demolished.

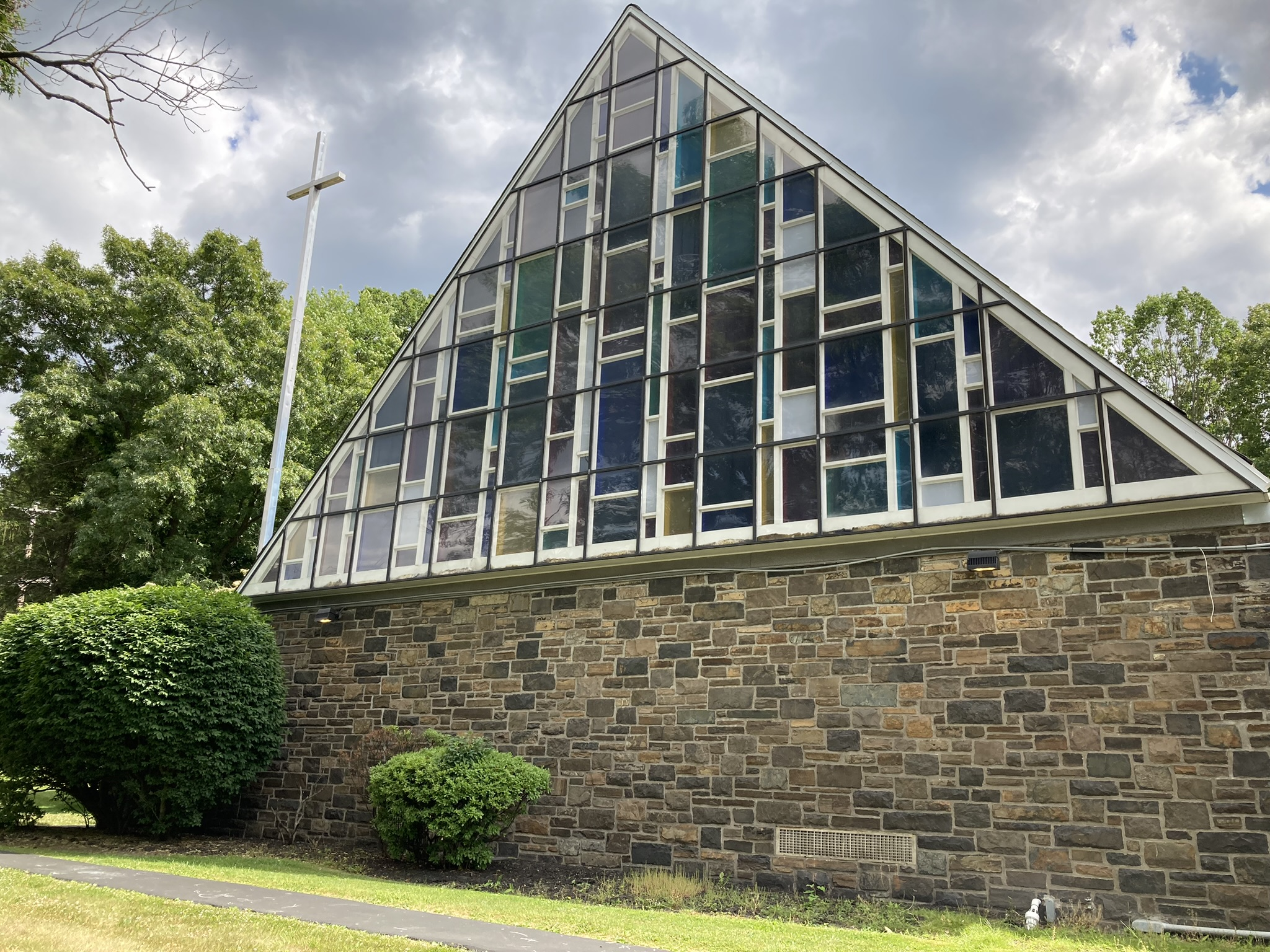
The stained-glass window at the RES chapel at the Oreland campus.

In 2025, RES completed a move to St. Paul's Reformed Episcopal Church in Oreland, Pennsylvania. The move was intended to situate the seminary in a more central Philadelphia-area location with larger and more up-to-date facility. The seminary began the process of selling the Blue Bell campus.

== Academics ==
The seminary educates and trains Christians for lay and ordained ministries. It emphasizes a belief in the inerrancy of the Bible as the word of God, adherence to reformed theology and evangelical beliefs, worship and polity in the Anglican tradition, and pastoral ministry training. The seminary offers a Master of Divinity (M.Div.) degree program, a diploma program, two certificate programs, and a licentiate for diaconal minister program or deaconess ministry. It is on the quarter system and requires the completion of 150 credits for the master's degree.

In 2015 the school initiated an honors thesis program for select M.Div. students. High achieving students are invited by the faculty to write a thesis in their senior year which they are required to defend before a panel of faculty members.

=== Accreditation ===
The seminary was granted initial accreditation by the Association of Theological Schools in the United States and Canada, effective August 8, 2013. The Theological Commission of the Reformed Episcopal Church and the Anglican Church in North America have also approved the Reformed Episcopal Seminary for the training of clergy.

== Mission ==
The charter of the seminary states that it was formed "for the purpose of educating and training men for the ministry of the Gospel of our Lord Jesus Christ especially in connection with the Reformed Episcopal Church and in accordance with the Constitution, Canons, rules, regulations, principles, Doctrine, and worship of said Church." Its mission statement declares that it seeks "to train Christ’s people to serve the flock of the Lord Jesus Christ through biblical, Anglican Worship, Example, and Discipleship as defined in the official standards of the Reformed Episcopal Church ... and to immerse students in Scripture, the historical and ancient traditions of the church, worship, and doctrine." The seminary emphasizes what they describe as "classical Anglicanism lived out in the world through worship, evangelism, and discipleship."

The seminary further describes itself as Evangelical, Catholic, Reformed, Ecumenical and Episcopal, defining the terms this way:

- Evangelical – proclaiming Jesus Christ as Savior and Lord;
- Catholic – affirming the faith of the apostles as expressed through the early creeds and liturgy;
- Reformed – holding the English Reformation doctrines of the primacy of Scripture and justification by grace through faith;
- Ecumenical – welcoming students from a variety of church groups and backgrounds;
- Episcopal – holding to the worship, doctrine, and order of the English Reformation.

While the seminary historically represented low-church evangelical churchmanship, under Matthew Harrington—dean and president since 2023—RES has repositioned itself to serve other traditions within Anglicanism, including Anglo-Catholicism and charismaticism. RES trains ministry students to use a variety of prayer books, including the U.S. 1928, the Canadian 1962, the REC's 2005 book and the 2019 ACNA prayer book.

== Student body ==
As of 2018, the seminary had 21 students enrolled in their ministerial degree program. Most students are Anglican but some come from a range of traditions. RES offers certificate programs for those who have trained in other traditions' seminaries to prepare for potential ordination in an Anglican church.

A third of the student body is residential, including more than two-thirds of its M.Div. students. Through the Bishop Cummins Grant, RES provides a full tuition award to all full-time residential students, permitting them to graduate without student loan debt.

== Notable alumni ==
=== Reformed Episcopal Church bishops ===
- Daniel G. Cox, 1952 B.D., RES board chairman
- William Culbertson III, 1927 diploma, president of Moody Bible Institute
- George Fincke, M.Div.
- Chuck Gillin, M.Div., RES chancellor
- Jason Grote, 1998 diploma, 2008 M.Div., REC bishop
- Royal U. Grote Jr., diploma, REC presiding bishop
- Theophilus Herter, 1943 M.Div., REC presiding bishop, RES professor
- Howard David Higgins, 1924 diploma, REC presiding bishop
- Leonard W. Riches, 1964 M.Div., REC presiding bishop, RES president and professor
- Robert Livingston Rudolph, 1894, REC presiding bishop, RES dean and professor
- Franklin Sellers, 1950 B.D., REC presiding bishop

=== Others ===
- Jay E. Adams, B.D., Presbyterian minister and counselor
- Samuel Baraga, 1974 M.Div., director, Bharat Bible College, Dabilpur India
- Roy A. Clouser, 1962 B.D., author and professor emeritus at The College of New Jersey
- Allen C. Guelzo, M.Div., historian, RES professor and dean
- Milton C. Fisher, 1948 B.D.; RES president, dean and professor; NIV Bible Translation Committee member
- Robert Knight Rudolph, 1932 B.D., RES professor
- Robert E. Webber, 1959 M.Div., author of Evangelicals on the Canterbury Trail

== See also ==
- Reformed Episcopal Church § Seminaries
