= Robert Knight Rudolph =

American theologian (1906–1986)

The Reverend Robert Knight Rudolph D.D.
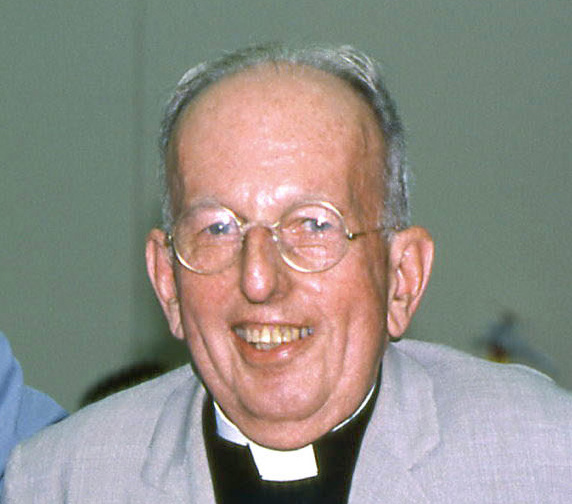
- Born: June 8, 1906; New York City, U.S.
- Died: July 14, 1986 (aged 80); Quarryville, Pennsylvania, U.S.
- Education: A.B., University of PA; B.D., Reformed Episcopal Seminary; Th.M., Westminster Seminary; D.D. (hon.), Reformed Episc. Seminary

Ecclesiastical career
- Ordained: Deacon on October 30, 1932; Presbyter on February 15, 1934
- Title: Professor of Systematic Theology and Christian Ethics

Robert Knight Rudolph (June 8, 1906 — July 14, 1986) was an American Reformed Episcopal minister and theologian. He served as Professor of Systematic Theology and Christian Ethics at the Theological Seminary of the Reformed Episcopal Church in Philadelphia for forty-nine years before his retirement in 1981. Together Rudolph and his father trained men for the gospel ministry at this institution for a total of seventy-four years. Rudolph was known for his strict adherence to Calvinism and presuppositional apologetics.

== Biography ==
Rudolph, the son of Bishop Robert Livingston Rudolph and his wife Anna Knight Rudolph, was born in New York City on June 8, 1906. He married Ruth Muriel Andrews of Dorset, VT. Ruth's mother owned a maple candy store there. He used to say that he loved maple candy and he loved the clerk.

After attending the Collegiate School in New York, Rudolph earned his undergraduate degree at the University of Pennsylvania in 1929. He went on to receive two graduate degrees. He earned a Bachelor of Divinity from the Theological Seminary of the Reformed Episcopal Church in 1932, at which time the commencement speaker was J. Gresham Machen, founder of Westminster Theological Seminary in Philadelphia. Rudolph began teaching at Reformed Episcopal Seminary that year and continued his studies at Westminster, where he received a Master of Theology degree. In the course of his training, he studied under Machen, Cornelius Van Til and Gordon Haddon Clark. His theology reflected the influences of all three men.

Since 1932, Rudolph taught at many schools, including the Philadelphia College of the Bible (now Philadelphia Biblical University) in Philadelphia and the Teacher's College (now Castleton State College) in Castleton, Vermont, but his greatest influence was at Reformed Episcopal Seminary, which also awarded him an honorary Doctor of Divinity in 1944.

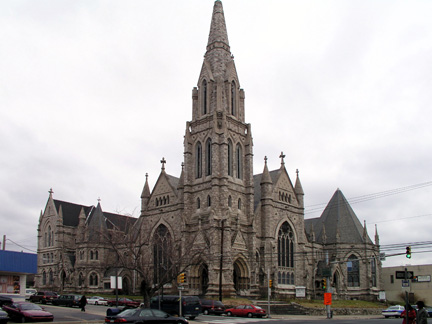
Reformed Episcopal Seminary (2003)

In addition to teaching, Rudolph served as Assistant Editor and finally Associate Editor of the Episcopal Recorder, a publication of the Reformed Episcopal Church. He contributed frequently to other church papers and magazines as well. In 1949, he was asked by William B. Eerdmans Publishing Company to write an Introduction for its printing of John Calvin's commentary on the book of Genesis. When Reformed Episcopal Seminary published a festscrift in 1986 commemorating its centennial, the editor included an article by Rudolph titled “The Attributes of God and God’s Image in Man.”

Rudolph was known for his hospitality, often giving generously to needy students. He also opened his family home, the Chalet (Dorset, VT) to family friends, including Fred Kuehner, Theophilus Herter, Howard David Higgins, Gordon Clark and countless newlyweds.

Rudolph died of cancer on July 14, 1986, at his home in Quarryville, PA, and was buried in the Maple Hill Cemetery near his family home in Dorset, VT.

== Bibliography ==
- Robert Knight Rudolph, “The Attributes of God and God’s Image in Man” in Ambitious to be Well-Pleasing, ed. Allen Carl Guelzo, (Jefferson, MD: Trinity Foundation, 1986), pp. 59–88.
- Robert Knight Rudolph, “Introduction” in Calvin's Commentary on Genesis (Grand Rapids: Eerdmans, 1949).

== Sources ==
- “A Trilogy of Tributes” in RESume (Summer, 1986), p. 9.
- “Dr. Rudolph — a P.K.’s Perspective in RESume (Fall, 1981), pp. 1, 3.
- Fred O. Kirms, “An Appreciation” in the Episcopal Recorder (Sept. 1977), pp. 7–9.
- Raymond A. Acker, A History of the Reformed Episcopal Seminary 1886–1964 (Phila.: Theological Seminary of the Reformed Episcopal Church, 1965).
- Rudolph, Rev. Robert K. (July 16, 1986). "REV. ROBERT K. RUDOLPH". The New York Times.
- “Rudolphisms” in RESume (Fall, 1981), pp. 4–5.
- Walter G. Truesdell, “Robert Knight Rudolph, 1906–1986: In Memorium” in RESume (Summer, 1986), p. 1.
