= William Culbertson III =

William Culbertson III (November 18, 1905 – November 16, 1971) was as an American pastor, bishop of the Reformed Episcopal Church, and the fifth president of the Moody Bible Institute, in Chicago, Illinois.

== Biography ==
Culbertson was born in Philadelphia on November 18, 1905, to William and Lydia (Roper) Culbertson. He graduated from the Reformed Episcopal Seminary, in Philadelphia, Pennsylvania, with a diploma in 1927. After graduation, he was ordained to the diaconate of the Reformed Episcopal Church and served as minister-in-charge of Grace Reformed Episcopal Church, Collingdale, Pennsylvania. He was ordained a presbyter the following year. On March 16, 1929, Culbertson was joined in marriage to Catharine Gantz. In 1930, he accepted the call to serve as rector of St. John's-by-the-Sea Reformed Episcopal Church in Ventnor City, New Jersey. He moved to the Reformed Episcopal Church of the Atonement in Philadelphia in 1933. He received his Bachelor of Science degree from Temple University, in 1939, at which time the seminary exchanged his diploma for a Bachelor of Divinity and conferred upon him an honorary Doctor of Divinity. Culbertson was elected bishop of the New York City and Philadelphia Synod of his denomination in 1937 and served in that position until he assumed the duties as dean of Moody Bible Institute in Chicago, Illinois, in 1942.

=== Reformed Episcopal Seminary ===
Culbertson never held a professorship in the seminary, but served as a lecturer for 12 years. In 1929, he began teaching preparatory Greek and Biblical theology. Later, he also taught Biblical geography, English Bible, and Christian education.

=== Moody Bible Institute ===
Culbertson first served M.B.I. as dean in 1942. Six years later, upon the death of Will H. Houghton, the trustees elected him to be the school's next president. He was the second Reformed Episcopalian to hold this position. Under his administration the school's curriculum was strengthened and a degree program was adopted. The day school enrollment grew to over 1,000 students. Five major buildings were added to the Chicago campus, as well. Missionary technical courses, including aviation and radio, were also added to the curriculum. Culbertson served until 1971, when he was appointed the school's first chancellor. He was also in high demand as a Bible conference speaker around the world. He served for a time as the president of the Accrediting Association of Bible Colleges.

Culbertson died on November 16, 1971, at the Swedish Covenant Hospital in Chicago, Illinois. His last words were reported to be "God ... God ... yes!" He was buried at Memory Gardens in Arlington Heights, Illinois. Warren W. Wiersbe wrote his biography, William Culbertson: A Man of God, by Moody Press.

Religious titles
| Preceded by Robert Westly Peach | Bishop Ordinary of the New York and Philadelphia Synod; 1937–1942 | Succeeded by Howard David Higgins |
| Preceded by William Henry Houghton | President of Moody Bible Institute; 1948–1971 | Succeeded by George Sweeting |
