= First Reformed Episcopal Church =

Historic Anglican congregation in Manhattan

- Saint Alban's Anglican Church: The First Reformed Episcopal Church
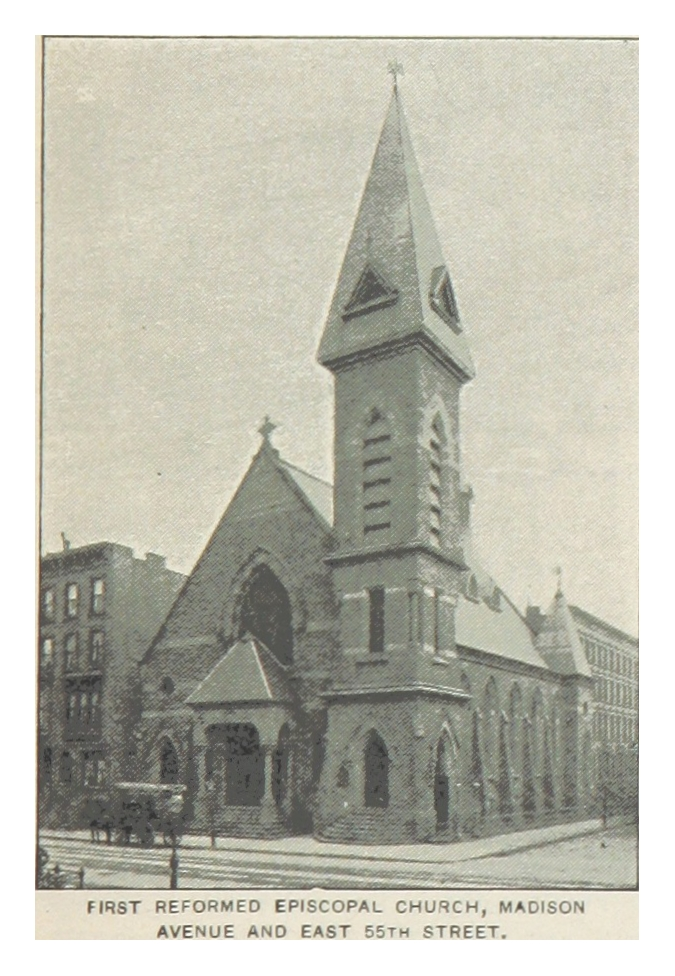
- The first permanent location of the First Reformed Episcopal Church at Madison Avenue and East 55th Street, built in 1877 and demolished in 1919.
- First Reformed Episcopal Church
- 40.74969°N 73.96995°W
- Address: 45 Tudor City Place, New York
- Country: United States
- Denomination: Reformed Episcopal Church; Anglican Church in North America
- Website: saintalbansnyc.org

History
- Founded: 1874
- Founder: George David Cummins
- Dedicated: 1877

Architecture
- Architect: James Stroud
- Style: Victorian Gothic
- Years built: 1876–1877
- Completed: 1877
- Construction cost: $107,000
- Demolished: 1920

Specifications
- Capacity: 1,100
- Length: 96 feet (29 m)
- Width: 66 feet (20 m)
- Materials: Stone

Administration
- Diocese: Northeast and Mid-Atlantic

The First Reformed Episcopal Church (formally Saint Alban's Anglican Church: The First Reformed Episcopal Church) is a congregation of the Reformed Episcopal Church in New York City. Incorporated by REC founder George David Cummins in March 1874, it was among the first newly established REC congregations after the REC's 1873 schism from the Episcopal Church in a dispute over Tractarianism. During First REC's history, it has held services at several locations throughout Midtown Manhattan, first at Madison Avenue and East 55th Street, then in multiple facilities on East 50th Street, and most recently at Tudor City.

== History of the congregation ==
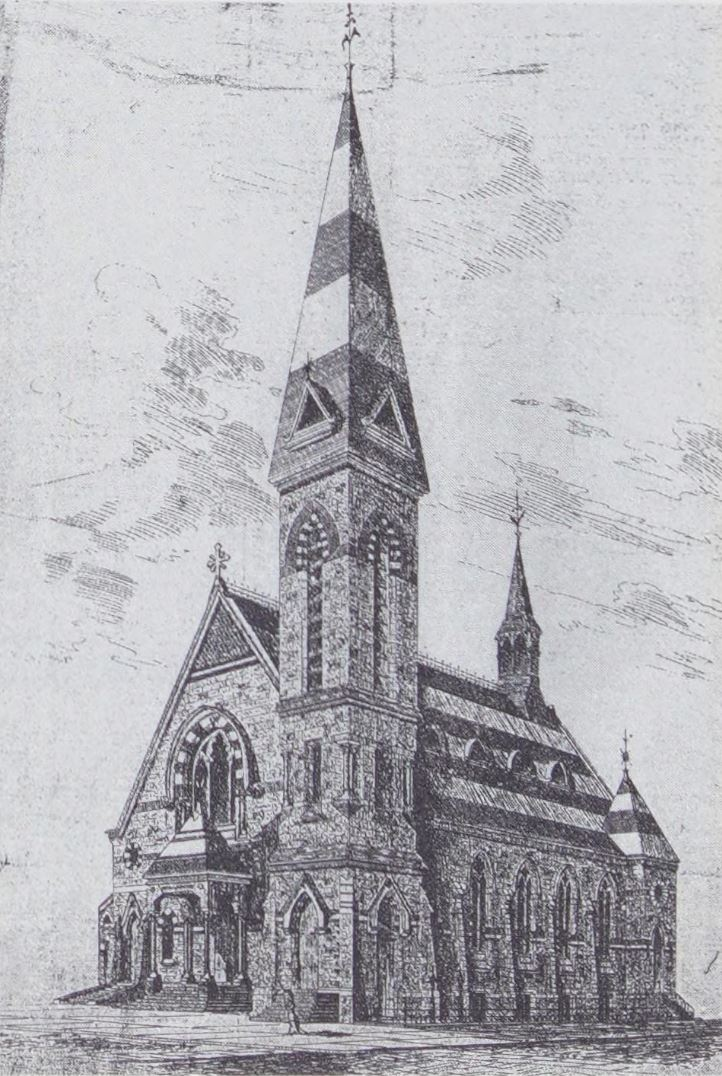
An artist's rendering, c. 1876, of the plan for the First Reformed Episcopal Church.

Amid a long-running dispute within the Episcopal Church about high church tendencies associated with the Oxford Movement versus low church evangelicalism, Kentucky bishop Cummins participated in an ecumenical service of Holy Communion at the Fifth Avenue Presbyterian Church. Rebuked by church leadership, Cummins and several other clergy and laity unilaterally withdrew from the Episcopal Church to form the Reformed Episcopal Church. They began holding church meetings in Lyric Hall in late 1873 and organized the congregation as the First Reformed Episcopal Church in March 1874. Not long after, Cummins became seriously ill, dying in 1876. He was succeeded as rector of First REC by former Episcopal priest and future REC bishop William T. Sabine.

Under Sabine's leadership, in 1876, the congregation began construction on a new church building at 551 Madison Avenue, on the northwest corner of East 55th Street. The Gothic Revival building was dedicated in 1877. The congregation remained at this site until 1919, when it sold the building to a developer that demolished the church and built a hotel on the site. From 1919 to 1921, the church met in rented space until purchasing the former Beekman Hill Methodist Episcopal Church, built in 1873 and located at 317 East 50th Street.

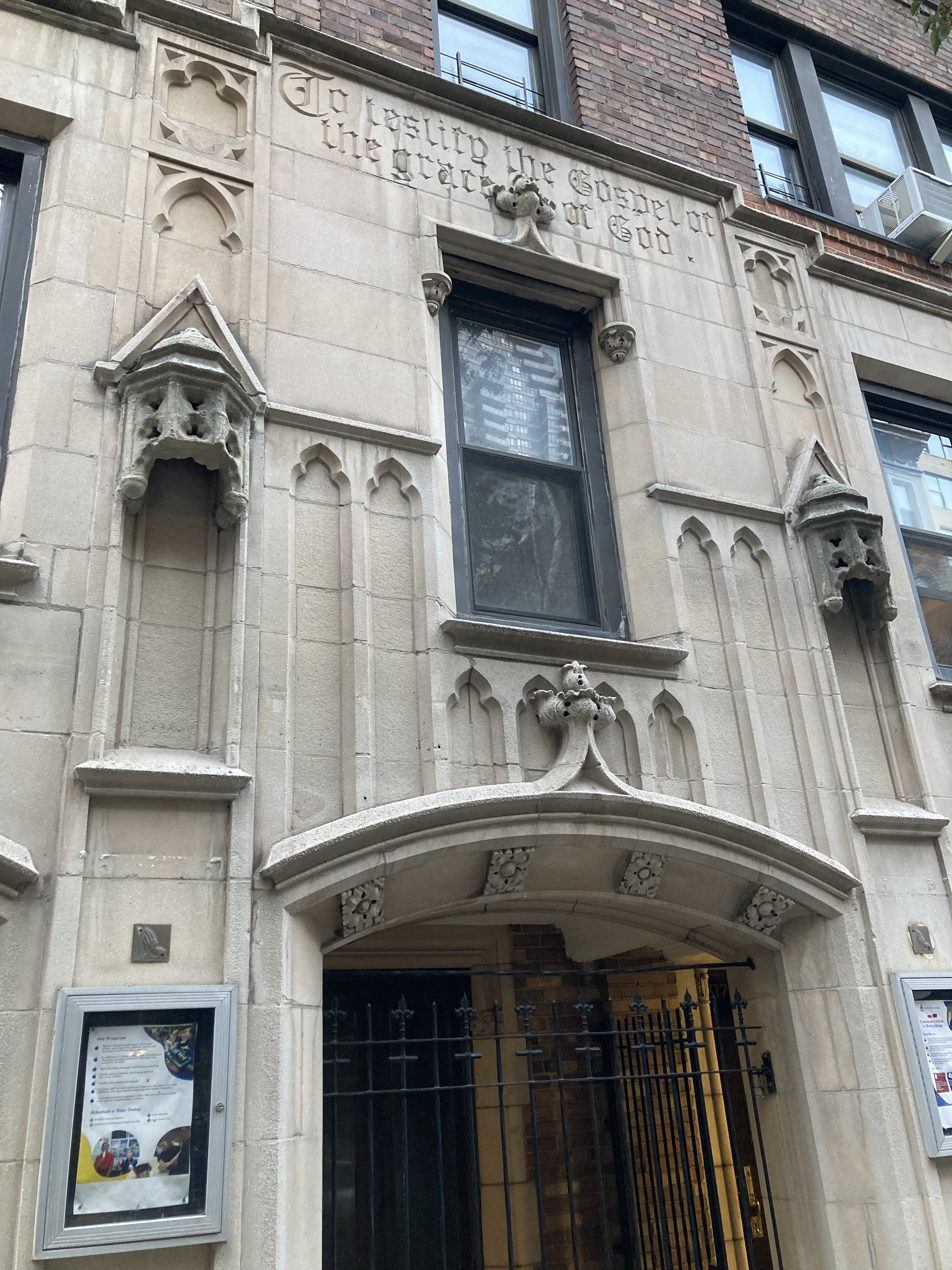
The entrance of the former First REC location at 317 East 50th Street with the inscription above.

The late 1920s saw the 50th Street building falling into poor condition. Without sufficient funds to restore it, First REC leased the site to the Labor Holding Corporation. This company then built a 12-story, income-generating apartment building that included spaces on its lower floors for the church's nave and other activities. The new apartment building was erected in 1931 and the church space on the ground floor was dedicated in September of that year.

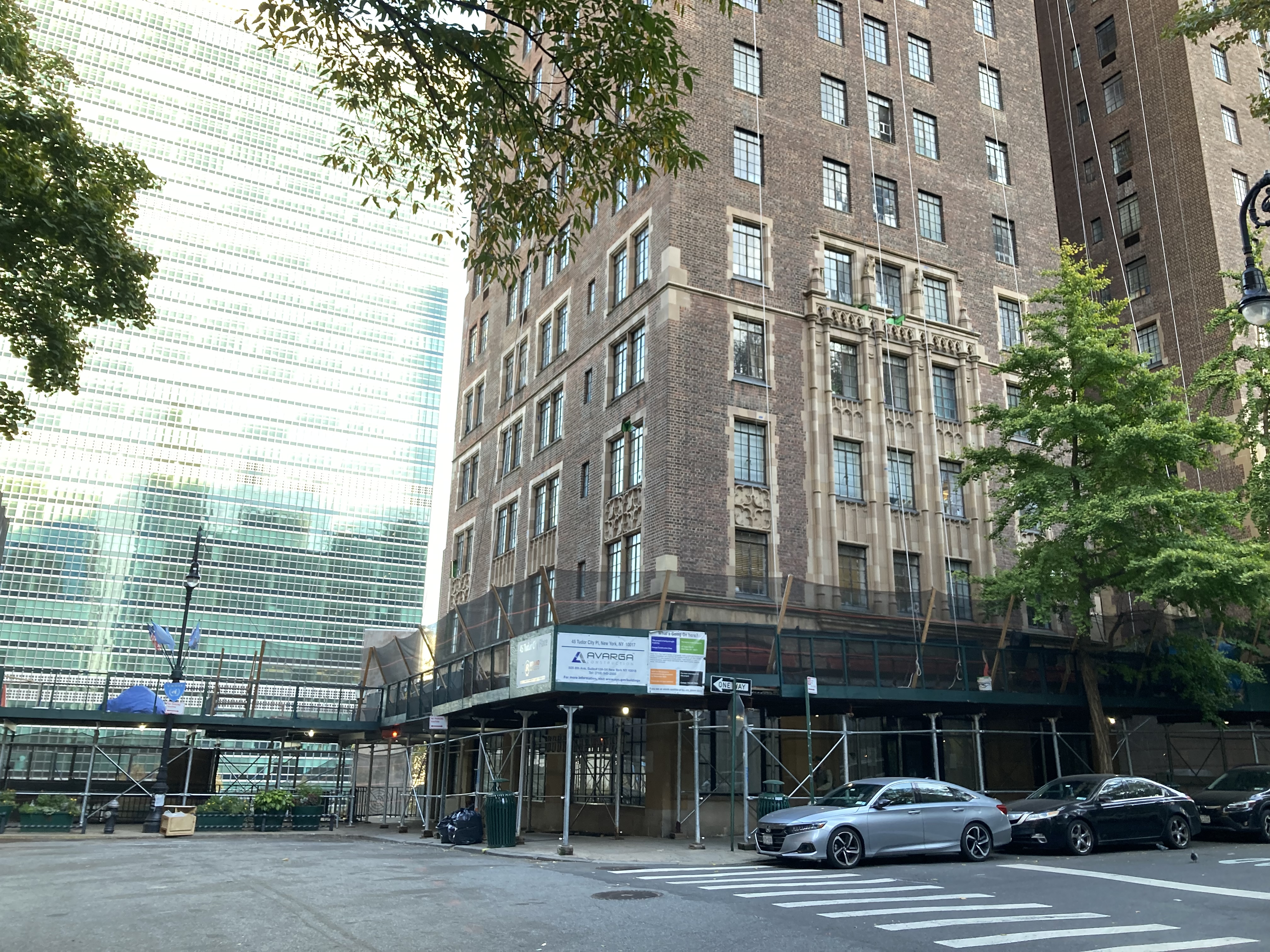
St. Alban’s Church (the First Reformed Episcopal Church) located in 2024 in a ground-floor suite at Tudor City, New York.

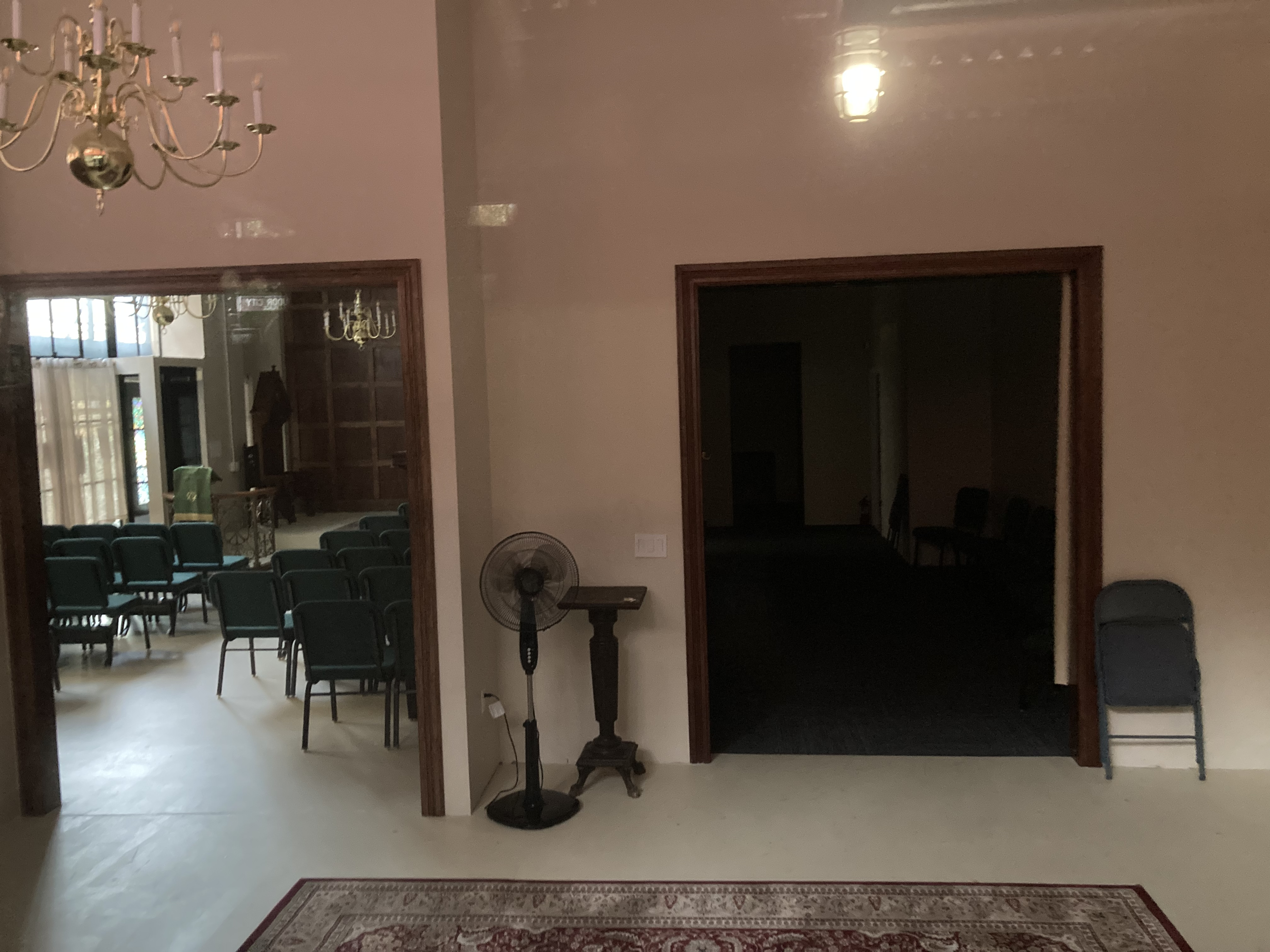
The foyer and nave of St. Alban's Tudor City location.

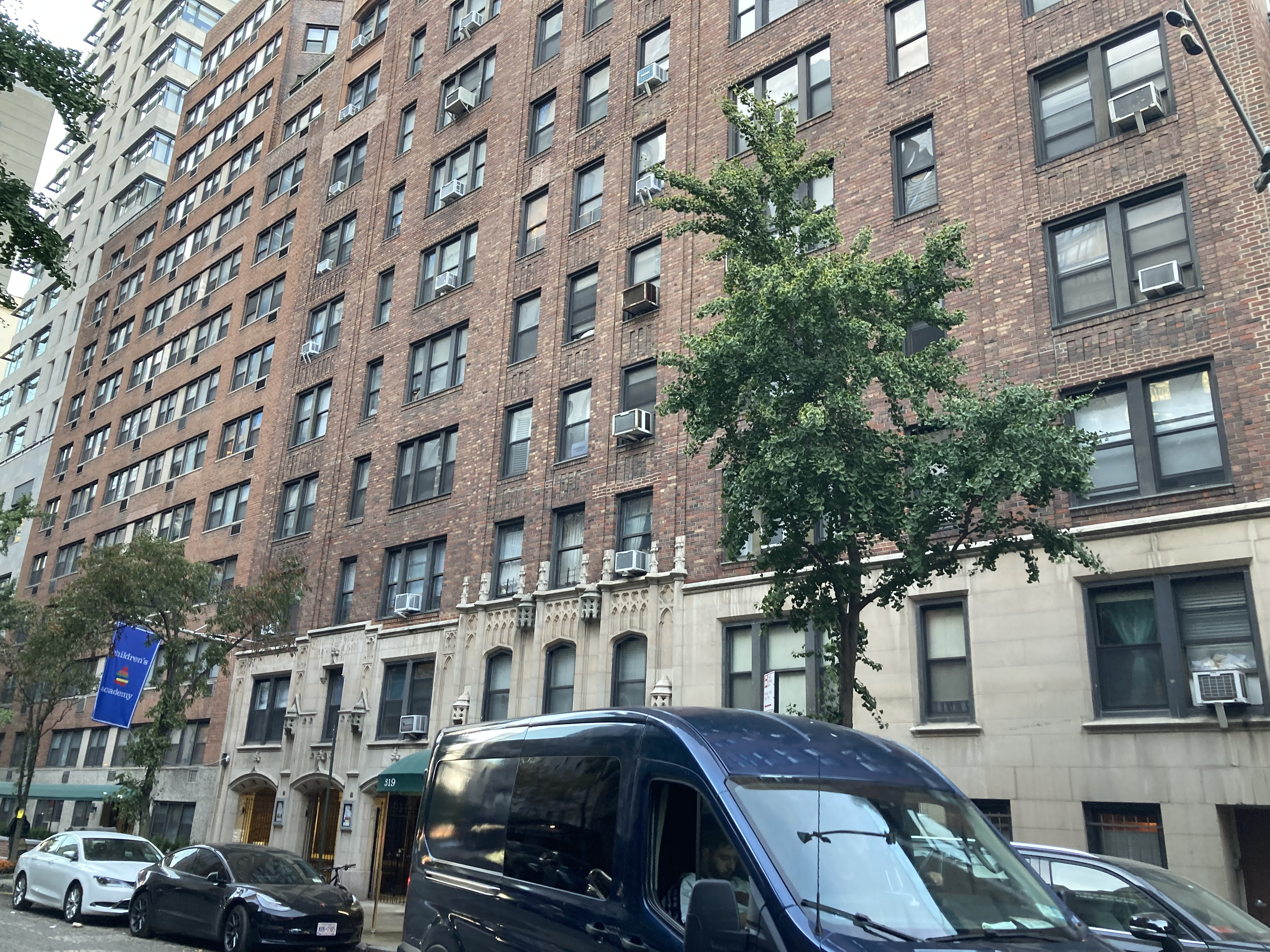
The former home of First REC in the Beekman Hill Cooperative, 317-319 East 50th Street.

In 2003, Matthew P. Harrington began a two-decade rectorate. After his arrival, an audit of the congregation's books revealed "widespread misappropriation." A lawsuit was filed against the former vestry members, and as a result of the investigation, in 2007, the church's volunteer treasurer was convicted of theft after stealing more than $400,000 from the church's collections over a five-year period. In 2019, the congregation vacated its space at 317 East 50th Street, leasing it to a school, putting the space up for sale and relocating to rented space at Tudor City. It donated its pipe organ—a Schantz instrument with three manuals, 37 registers, 26 stops and 31 ranks—to the Daughters of Mary, Mother of Our Savior.

== Architecture ==
=== Madison Avenue ===
The Madison Avenue church was built in a Victorian Gothic Revival style, 66 feet wide and 96 feet long. It was faced with Newark stone and dressed with Berlin stone. The southeast corner of the church featured a square bell tower topped with a pyramidal steeple.

The interior of the church was characterized by an open-timbered roof with carved ribs resting on corbels against the walls. The interior woodwork was made of ash. The main floor of the nave offered seating for 900 worshipers, with an additional 200 seats in the gallery. The Sunday school in the basement could accommodate 600.

=== East 50th Street ===
The apartment building was built in the Tudor Revival style popular at the time. The two lower levels, where the church premises were located, were faced with stone. The façade is inscribed with "To Testify the Gospel of the Grace of God."

== Rectors ==
Since 1874, the rectors of First REC have included four current or future presiding bishops of the REC:

1. George David Cummins (1874)
2. William Tufnell Sabine (1874–1908)
3. Charles Hamilton Coon (1908–1909)
4. William DuBose Stevens (1909–1918)
5. Percy T. Edrop (1919–1923)
6. Charles Pittman (1923–1927)
7. Howard David Higgins (1927–1954)
8. S. Thomas Percival (1954–1961)
9. Leonard W. Riches (1967–1977)
10. Thomas R. May (1977–1985)
11. William J. Holiman Jr. (1985–1997)
12. Gregory McComas (1999–2002)
13. Matthew P. Harrington (2003–2023)
