= Robert Westly Peach =

American Reformed Episcopal bishop (1863–1936)

The Right Reverend Robert Westly Peach D.D.
- Presiding Bishop of the Reformed Episcopal Church
- Church: Reformed Episcopal Church
- Diocese: New York and Philadelphia Synod
- In office: 1922–1930
- Predecessor: Robert Livingston Rudolph
- Successor: Frank V. C. Cloak
- Other post(s): Bishop of the New York and Philadelphia Synod, 1930–1936

Orders
- Consecration: May 23, 1924 by Robert Livingston Rudolph

Personal details
- Born: November 27, 1863
- Died: December 23, 1936 (aged 73); Upper Darby Township, Pennsylvania, United States
- Spouse: Harriet
- Children: 3

Robert Westly Peach (November 27, 1863 — December 23, 1936) was an American Reformed Episcopal bishop and hymnologist. He was presiding bishop of the Reformed Episcopal Church and bishop of its New York and Philadelphia Synod from 1930 until his death in 1936. He was also known for his collection of 6,000 hymnals—at the time of his death, the largest such collection in private ownership.

== Biography ==
Peach was born in 1863 and educated at Boston University. He began pastoral ministry in 1890 in Ashtabula, Ohio, later serving as pastor of Second Presbyterian Church in Camden, New Jersey. He was received into the Reformed Episcopal Church in 1907 and pastored Emmanuel R.E.C. in Newark, New Jersey, for 17 years. In 1924, he was set apart as a bishop of the Reformed Episcopal Church.

Within the Reformed Episcopal Church, Peach was a professor of church history at Reformed Episcopal Seminary and held several denominational offices. He was also an executive committee member of the Federal Council of Churches. In 1924, he was consecrated as coadjutor bishop of the New York and Philadelphia Synod.

Peach succeeded Robert Livingston Rudolph as presiding bishop and bishop of the New York and Philadelphia synod in 1930, serving until his own death in 1936. At the time of his death, he was married to Harriet, and they had three surviving children.

== Legacy ==
After his death, Peach's collection of 6,000 hymnals—the largest in private hands at that time and which he had spent his lifetime assembling—was acquired by the American Antiquarian Society. The Peach collection continues to form the core of the Society's collections of hymnbooks. Peach also annotated John Julian's 1907 Dictionary of Hymnology.

Religious titles
| Preceded by Robert Livingston Rudolph | Bishop Ordinary of the New York and Philadelphia Synod; 1930–1936 | Succeeded by William Culbertson III |
| Preceded by Robert Livingston Rudolph | Presiding Bishop of the Reformed Episcopal Church; 1930–1936 | Succeeded by Frank V. C. Cloak |
