= Robert Livingston Rudolph =

American Reformed Episcopal bishop (1865–1930)

The Right Reverend Robert Livingston Rudolph D.D.
- Presiding Bishop of the Reformed Episcopal Church
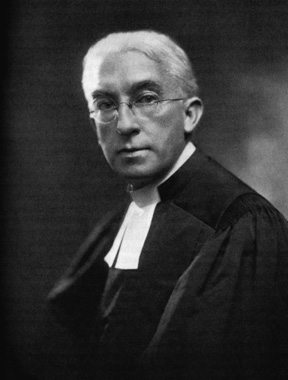
- Church: Reformed Episcopal Church
- Diocese: New York and Philadelphia Synod
- In office: 1922–1930
- Predecessor: Samuel Fallows
- Successor: Robert Westly Peach
- Other post(s): Bishop of the New York and Philadelphia Synod, 1913–1930; Dean of Reformed Episcopal Seminary, 1924–1930

Orders
- Ordination: 1895 (deacon); 1896 (presbyter)
- Consecration: January 12, 1909 by Samuel Fallows

Personal details
- Born: December 29, 1865; New York City, New York, United States
- Died: September 16, 1930 (aged 64); Dorset, Vermont, United States
- Children: Robert Knight Rudolph
- Education: Reformed Episcopal Seminary, Princeton Theological Seminary

Robert Livingston Rudolph (December 29, 1865 — September 16, 1930) was an American bishop of the Reformed Episcopal Church. He was the first bishop to be raised with the church. Rudolph also served as Professor of Dogmatic Theology and Christian Ethics at the Theological Seminary of the Reformed Episcopal Church in Philadelphia for twenty-seven years before his death. Together Rudolph and his son, Robert Knight Rudolph, trained men for the gospel ministry at this institution for a total of seventy-four years. Rudolph was widely recognized as an outstanding preacher, teacher, scholar and bishop.

== Biography ==
Rudolph was born and reared in New York City, attending city schools until the eighth grade. Until the age of ten, he and his family went to the Fourth German Reformed Mission (Reformed Church in America) pastored by John H. Oerter. At that time, to encourage Rudolph to learn English, the family joined the First Reformed Episcopal Church pastored by the Rev. William T. Sabine, who later became a bishop in the Reformed Episcopal Church. After finishing school, Rudolph went into the jewelry business for five years.

=== Education ===
Rudolph graduated New York University in 1892, and received a master's degree from the same institution four years later. In 1894 he graduated from the Theological Seminary of the Reformed Episcopal Church. Desiring to study under the famous B. B. Warfield, he continued his postgraduate studies at Princeton Seminary for one more year. In 1906 New York University awarded him an honorary Doctor of Divinity. That same year he traveled to Erlangen, Germany to study under Professor Theodor Zahn, the leader in conservative New Testament scholarship at the time.

=== Ordination ===
Rudolph was ordained deacon in 1895 and presbyter in 1896. On January 12, 1909, he was consecrated a bishop in his home church by three bishops and ten presbyters with Bishop Charles Edward Cheney preaching the sermon. Rudolph first served as coadjutor of the New York and Philadelphia Synod before succeeding Bishop Sabine to the bishopric upon the latter’s death in 1913. Throughout the next few years, he also served as bishop in Canada, acting bishop in Chicago, and bishop of the Special Missionary Jurisdiction of the South. He became the presiding bishop of the denomination in 1922, and was re-elected to that position in 1924, 1927 and 1930. He is credited with having saved the church from disintegration after the vestments controversy.

=== Seminary professor ===
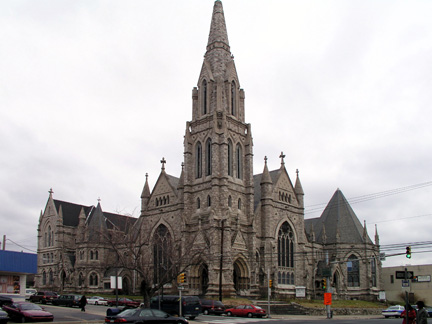
Reformed Episcopal Seminary (2003)

The board of trustees of the Reformed Episcopal Seminary elected Rudolph to teach dogmatic theology in 1903. He resigned as Bishop Sabine’s assistant in order to take up the challenge of this new work. Later, he became professor of Biblical theology and Christian ethics. He devoted twenty-seven years of his life to training men for pastoral service, using A. A. Hodge’s Outlines of Theology, which presents theological topics in question and answer format, to stimulate discussion in the classroom. And to make sure that his students knew the Bible, he required that they read through it in its entirety in two years using James M. Gray’s Biblical Synthesis course.

The seminary granted Rudolph a sabbatical for the academic year 1930–31 to study abroad, but he died at his summer home in Dorset, VT, on September 16, 1930, before he was scheduled to leave.

== Sources ==
- Allen C. Guelzo, For the Union of Evangelical Christendom: The Irony of the Reformed Episcopalians (University Park, PA: Pennsylvania State University Press, 1994).
- “Bishop Robert Livingston Rudolph, 1865–1930” in RESume (Fall, 1981), pp. 1ff.
- Raymond A. Acker, A History of the Reformed Episcopal Seminary 1886–1964 (Phila.: Theological Seminary of the Reformed Episcopal Church, 1965).

Religious titles
Preceded by William T. Sabine	Bishop Ordinary of the New York and Philadelphia Synod; 1913–1930	Succeeded by Robert Westly Peach
Preceded by Samuel Fallows	Presiding Bishop of the Reformed Episcopal Church; 1922–1930	Succeeded by Robert Westly Peach
