= Theophilus Herter =

Reformed Episcopal bishop (1913–1987)

The Most Reverend Theophilus J. Herter D.D.
- Presiding Bishop of the Reformed Episcopal Church
- Church: Reformed Episcopal Church
- Diocese: New York and Philadelphia Synod
- In office: 1975–1987
- Predecessor: Howard David Higgins
- Successor: William Jerdan Jr.
- Other posts: Bishop ordinary of the New York and Philadelphia Synod (1972–1984)

Orders
- Ordination: November 29, 1944 (priesthood) by Howard David Higgins
- Consecration: June 15, 1966 by Howard David Higgins

Personal details
- Born: June 5, 1913 Kessab, Ottoman Empire
- Died: June 2, 1987 (aged 73) Philadelphia, Pennsylvania

Theophilus John Herter (June 5, 1913 – June 2, 1987) was an American Anglican bishop. He was bishop of the New York and Philadelphia Synod in the Reformed Episcopal Church (REC) and also served as presiding bishop of the church.

== Early life and education ==
Herter was born to John and Agnes Herter on June 5, 1913, in Kessab in present-day Syria. John Herter was the director of a German-run orphanage in Kessab. He received his B.A. and his M.A. from Haverford College in 1945 and 1947, respectively; his M.A. thesis was on Anglican and Presbyterian clergymen of Philadelphia during the American Revolution. Herter also obtained an M.Div. from Reformed Episcopal Seminary in 1943 and a Th.M. and Th.D. from Westminster Theological Seminary, where his dissertation was entitled "The Abrahamic Covenant in the Gospels." The dissertation was published under the same title in 1972.

== Ordained ministry ==
Herter was ordained by Bishop Howard David Higgins to the diaconate on February 16, 1943, and to the presbyterate in the Reformed Episcopal Church on November 29, 1944. He began his ordained ministry as rector of St. Matthew's REC in Havertown, where he spent 17 years. He also taught New Testament studies at Reformed Episcopal Seminary starting in 1948, where he spent 36 years, the last 21 as professor of New Testament studies.

In 1965, Herter was elected assistant bishop in the REC's New York and Philadelphia Synod and later bishop coadjutor, succeeding Higgins as bishop ordinary in 1972. He was elected presiding bishop of the REC in 1975 and served for four three-year terms. He retired as bishop ordinary in 1984 and stepped down as presiding bishop in May 1987, shortly before his death on June 2.

== Personal life ==
Herter married the former Ruth Birbeck (1910–2003) on June 14, 1941, and they were married until his death. They had one son, Philip, and two grandchildren.

Religious titles
Preceded by Howard D. Higgins	Presiding Bishop of the Reformed Episcopal Church; 1975–1987	Succeeded by William Jerdan Jr.
Preceded by Howard D. Higgins	Bishop Ordinary of the New York and Philadelphia Synod; 1972–1984	Succeeded by Leonard W. Riches
