= William Nicholson (American bishop) =

William Rufus Nicholson (January 8, 1822 - June 7, 1901) was a bishop of the Reformed Episcopal Church and one of the first professors at the Theological Seminary of the Reformed Episcopal Church. Nicholson received an honorary Doctor of Divinity degree from Kenyon College in Ohio. When the Reformed Episcopal Seminary was founded, Nicholson became Dean and one of its first professors. He also wrote a commentary on the book of Colossians titled Oneness with Christ.

== Biography ==
Nicholson was born in Greene County, Mississippi, on January 8, 1822, where his father was a judge. He converted to Christianity as a result of attending a Methodist camp in 1835. After attending LaGrange College, the Methodist Episcopal College in LaGrange, Georgia, he was ordained at the age of twenty and served four years in New Orleans. He transferred to the Protestant Episcopal Church in 1847 and was ordained by Bishop Leonidas Polk. Having served four churches in this denomination (in New Orleans, LA; Cincinnati, OH; Boston, MA and Newark, NJ), he decided to transfer to the Reformed Episcopal Church in 1875. That same year he was elected bishop, with his consecration by Bishop George David Cummins taking place on February 24, 1876, in Philadelphia. He served as bishop of the New York and Philadelphia Synod of the Reformed Episcopal Church until his death.

Nicholson died on June 7, 1901, in Philadelphia. He was buried in Forest Hills Cemetery, Boston.

== See also ==
- List of bishops of the Reformed Episcopal Church

== Works ==
- The Bible Explainer; or a Dictionary of the Names, Countries, Cities, Towns, Villages, Seas, Lakes, Rivers, Productions, Eastern Manners and Customs, Antiquities, and Natural History, as Contained in the Old and New Testaments (Halifax: W. Nicholson and Sons.; London: Simpkin, Marshall & Co.; Hamilton: Adams & Co.; Manchester: John Heywood and A. Heywood and Son. 1870)
