= George David Cummins =

American Anglican Bishop

- 1897 illustration
- Born: December 11, 1822; Delaware, United States
- Died: June 26, 1876 (aged 53); Lutherville, Maryland, United States
- Education: Dickinson College
- Occupation: Religious leader
- Organization: Reformed Episcopal Church (after c. 1873)
- Known for: Founder of the Reformed Episcopal Church
- Spouse: Alexandrine "Ella" Balch Cummins

George David Cummins (December 11, 1822 – June 26, 1876) was an American Anglican bishop and founder of the Reformed Episcopal Church.

== Life and career ==
He was born in Delaware on December 11, 1822. Cummins graduated from Dickinson College, located in Carlisle, Pennsylvania, in 1841, and entered the Methodist ministry.

In 1845, he took orders in the Protestant Episcopal Church. After serving as rector of Episcopal parishes in Virginia, Washington, and Chicago, Cummins was appointed Assistant Bishop of Kentucky in 1866.

A staunch Evangelical of Reformed doctrine, Cummins opposed the influences of Ritualism and the Anglo-Catholic Oxford Movement. In 1873, he was criticized for receiving communion with ministers outside of the Protestant Episcopal Church and resigned his position. He then founded the Reformed Episcopal Church, of which he was the first presiding bishop, in New York City and where he founded the First Reformed Episcopal Church. A tremendous reference that gets no visibility or discussion and that details the Bishop's life, attitudes, beliefs, and career are given by his wife, Alexandrine, in the Memoirs.

== Doctrine ==
Cummins' Evangelical theological persuasions led him to separate from the Episcopal Church, which had, in his mind, been poisoned by the ritualism of the Anglo-Catholic party. Before he left the Episcopal Church, Cummins as bishop engaged in a highly provocative Church service in which he presided alongside a Presbyterian clergyman, Dr. John Hall, over Holy Communion at Hall's Fifth Avenue Presbyterian Church.

Cummins believed that if the pure Evangelical principles of the Reformation were to survive the sacramental and ecclesial theological complications and gaudy ornamentation of the Anglo-Catholic movement, Evangelicals of all denominations must unite. He sought "Evangelical Catholicity" based on the ideas of the "Muhlenberg Memorial," authored by the prestigious Evangelical Episcopalian, William Augustus Muhlenberg. "Strength to the Protestant cause," declared Muhlenberg, "is one of the objects of this movement [i.e., the Muhlenberg Memorial]." Those, "who are true to the Reformation standards" needed to present "a united phalanx against Rome," Muhlenberg explained. Cummins embodied this charge. And when he could no longer in good conscience serve the Diocese of Kentucky due to Ritualistic advances, he left the Episcopal Church.

Bishop Cummins left the Episcopal Church due to conflict with Anglo-Catholic theology, one facet of which is the insistence on Apostolical Succession for valid ordinations. Cummins felt that such a high view of Episcopacy injured the objectives of the new Re-formed Episcopal Church, which, now formed, sought to provide a unified Evangelical haven for all Reformational Christians in the spirit of "Evangelical catholicity". Ironically, Cummins, who preached against a high view of Apostolic Succession, was unwilling to part with it. When he left the Episcopal Church, and before he was deposed, he rushed to consecrate another bishop, the somewhat controversial Charles E. Cheney of Christ Church, Chicago, as the second bishop of the Reformed Episcopal Church. Thereafter, the Reformed Episcopal Church's orders retained as episcopacy as "ancient and desirable," although other forms of church governments were not unchurched or belittled.

== Death ==
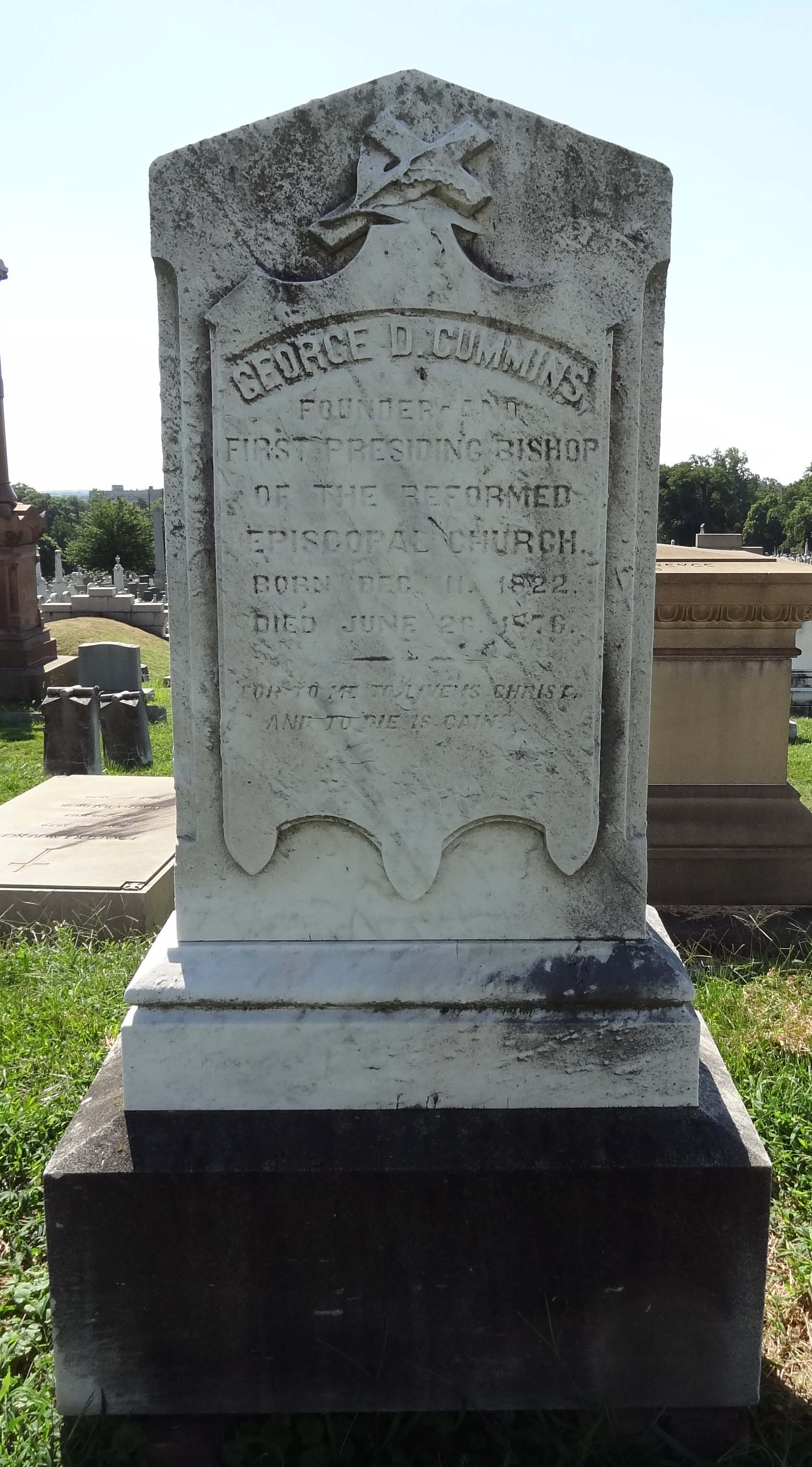
Gravesite

Cummins died in Lutherville, Maryland, on June 26, 1876.

== See also ==
- Bishop Cummins Reformed Episcopal Church
- List of Dickinson College alumni
- List of founders of religious traditions
- List of people from Chicago
- List of people from Delaware
- List of people from Kentucky
- List of people from New York City
- List of people from Virginia
- List of people from Washington, D.C.

Religious titles
Preceded by New creation	Presiding Bishop of the Reformed Episcopal Church; 1873–1876	Succeeded by Charles Edward Cheney
