= DeLisa Chinn-Tyler =

American softball outfielder

Personal information
- Born: 1960 (age 65–66)
- Years active: 1971-2012

Sport
- Sport: Softball
- Position: Outfielder

DeLisa Chinn-Tyler is a retired American softball outfielder. Chinn-Tyler, who is Black, appeared in an "iconic" scene in the 1992 baseball movie A League of Their Own as a bystander who powerfully throws back an overthrown ball to two White players, then gives them a glance full of meaning.

== Life and softball career ==
Chinn-Tyler, who is from Evansville, Indiana, played softball competitively from 1971, when she was 11. She sometimes joined Little League baseball teams when no softball teams were available.

In 1979, as a freshman at the University of Southern Indiana, she played as both an outfielder and infielder for the Screaming Eagles. As of May 2026, she holds the USI records for most stolen bases in a single game, the second highest batting average in a career (.410), and is tied for the sixth most stolen bases in a career. She eventually played for the Evansville Express, a renowned all-Black women's slow-pitch softball team that was reported to dominate games and tournaments around the Midwest in the 1970s and 1980s. She also played for Prime Time, a team sponsored by Olympic athlete Jackie Joyner-Kersee.

Chinn-Tyler was known for her ability to throw runners out at first base from center field and was described as a "double threat on offense". She retired from softball at age 52, at which time she was still playing outfield.

As of 2022, Chinn-Tyler was working as a team leader at Toyota Motor Manufacturing Indiana.

== In film ==
Chinn-Tyler was cast in the 1992 women's baseball movie A League of Their Own, which was filmed primarily in Evansville, after she answered an open casting call in the local paper. She was one of two Black women who came to the tryouts, but was told there were no parts for them because at the time the film was set, the sport was not integrated. However, director Penny Marshall was at the tryouts that day, saw Chinn-Tyler play, and decided to write her into the film.

In the scene, a ball is overthrown and lands near Bosse Field's first base bullpen, where a small crowd of Black spectators are standing to watch the game in the segregated stadium. Chinn-Tyler's unnamed character walks forward, picks up the ball, and throws it to Ellen Sue Gotlander (played by White actor Freddie Simpson), who is warming up with Dorothy "Dottie" Hinson (played by Geena Davis), in the bullpen; the throw is clearly a mighty one.

Chinn-Tyler recalls being told to throw the ball to Davis, then "give her a look that said that Black women could play also". According to Collider, the scene references pitcher Mamie Johnson, one of three women to break the gender barrier in the Negro leagues. The scene takes less than 15 seconds but is considered an important and "iconic" moment in the film. Chinn-Tyler received $750 for the part; she was told she would be credited, but her name does not appear in the credits of the film.

== See also ==
- Women in baseball
- Toni Stone
- Connie Morgan
- A League of Their Own (2022 TV series)
