= Merl (name) =

Merl is both a surname and a given name. Notable people with the name include:

== Surname ==
- Monika Merl (born 1979), German 800 metre runner
- Noah Merl (born 1983), American psychotherapist and former soccer player
- Robert Merl (born 1991), Austrian orienteering competitor
- Volkert Merl (born 1944), German racing driver

== Given name ==
- Merl Code (born 1948), American lawyer and former Canadian Football League player
- Merl Condit (1917–1992), American National Football League player
- Merl LaVoy (1885–1953), American photographer and documentary cinematographer
- Merl Lindsay (1916–1965), American Western swing musician
- Merl Reagle (1950–2015), American crossword constructor
- Merl Saunders (1934–2008), American keyboardist
