= Joe Burt Scott =

Baseball player (1920-2013)

- Outfielder
- Born: October 2, 1920; Memphis, Tennessee, U.S.
- Died: March 21, 2013 (aged 92); Memphis, Tennessee, U.S.
- Batted: Left Threw: Left

Teams
- Memphis Red Sox (1945, 1947–1948); New York Black Yankees (1946); Pittsburgh Crawfords; Chicago American Giants; Zulu Cannibal Giants

Joseph Burt Scott (October 2, 1920 – March 21, 2013) was an American professional baseball outfielder and first baseman who played in several different Negro leagues.

A left-handed hitter, Scott played from 1936 through 1956 for the New York Black Yankees, Pittsburgh Crawfords, Chicago American Giants, Memphis Red Sox and Zulu Cannibal Giants.

Scott attended Tilden Tech High School in Chicago. He was the only player of color on his high school team which won the 1937 city championship played at Wrigley Field. He was 5'7" and weighed 160 during his playing career.

In 1942, Scott had a batting average of .714 in 58 games before the season was ended early due to World War II. He went on to serve in the US Army during the war.

In 2008, Major League Baseball staged a special draft of the surviving Negro league players, doing a tribute for those ballplayers who were kept out of the Big Leagues because of their race. MLB clubs each drafted a former NLB player, and Scott was selected by the Milwaukee Brewers.

Scott died on March 21, 2013, after suffering a stroke while sleeping. He was 92.
