= Syd Pollock =

American sports executive

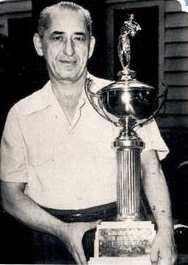
- Born: Sydney S. Pollock; March 20, 1901; North Tarrytown, New York, U.S.
- Died: November 22, 1968 (aged 67); Hollywood, Florida, U.S.

Sydney S. Pollock (March 20, 1901 - November 22, 1968) was an American sports executive in Negro league baseball. Pollock worked as a booking agent for several clubs starting in the late 1910s before becoming an executive with the Havana Red Sox/Cuban House of David/Pollock's Cuban Stars from 1927 to 1933. Pollock served as the booker, general manager and eventual primary owner of the Ethiopian/Indianapolis Clowns from 1936 to 1965. He signed Hank Aaron to his first professional contract in 1952. In 1952 and 1953, he signed three female players, the only women to play in the Negro leagues full-time.

== Baseball career ==
Pollock, who was Jewish, was born in North Tarrytown, New York, in 1901, the son of Edward and Sarah Pollock. He began booking opponents for semi-professional white, Black, Cuban and women's baseball clubs as early as 1917. By 1924, his Syd Pollock Agency of North Tarrytown represented more than a half dozen clubs, including the New York Bloomer Girls team, Chappie Johnson's All-Stars, and the Royal Blue Giants of New York. By 1927, he was scheduling games for the traveling Havana Red Sox In 1930, while still operating the Havana Red Sox, he booked games for the Florida Cuban Giants.

In 1931, the Havana Red Sox changed their name to the Cuban House of David, and were the only Cuban team permitted to enter the country that spring by the United States Immigration Department. In a nod to the House of David clubs, some players sported various styles of beards, with Pollock the player with the longest and heaviest beard by March 15 a prize. Before the season began, Pollock wrote to the Pittsburgh Courier that he had spent at least $5,200 on the club in hopes of building a powerhouse team. In March 1932, the club joined the East–West League in March 1932 as Pollock's Cuban Stars. After the league disbanded, the Cuban Stars returned as an independent club.

Pollock's booking agency scheduled games for the Zulu Cannibal Giants in 1935, a club that featured shirtless players who wore only grass skirts.

By 1936, he was the booking agent for the barnstorming Miami Giants, who were renamed the Ethiopian Clowns, with Pollock having forged a partnership with owner Hunter Campbell after loading him money. He would have an ownership stake in the Clowns by 1937.

In 1941, Pollock also handled games for a cross-continental tour of the Havana Cuban Giants, a revival of his Cuban Stars.

By 1942, Pollock was the Clowns' general manager as the team joined the Negro Major League as the Cincinnati Clowns, before the league collapsed after one season. Owner Campbell died in Miami in December 1942, and while ownership remained in the Campbell family, Pollock continued to run the baseball operations. The team, which at various points would be referred to as the Ethiopian, Cincinnati and Miami Clowns, joined the Negro American League for the 1943 season. Before the 1944 season, the Clowns were transferred to Indianapolis from Cincinnati after club and league owners decided attendance in Cincinnati was below expectations.

Pollock signed Hank Aaron for the Clowns to his first professional contract for a reported $250 a month for the 1952 season and a new suit. Aaron was sold to the Milwaukee Braves later that year. In 1953, Pollock signed Toni Stone for the Clowns, the first female player in the previously all-male Negro leagues. After Stone was signed by the Kansas City Monarchs for the 1954, Pollock signed two more women, Connie Morgan and Mamie Johnson. He later served as a scout for the Milwaukee Braves.

Pollock retired after the 1964 season, and sold his controlling interest to Ed Hamann in January 1965. He died on November 22, 1968, and was survived by his wife, Villa, five children, and 17 grandchildren.

== Criticism ==
Pollock received criticism from some fellow baseball executives and members of the media for the Clowns' presentation and on-the-field actions. Among the most vocal was Pittsburgh Courier sportswriter Wendell Smith. In 1943, Smith criticized Pollock for marketing the Clowns as representatives of multiple locations, causing confusion among fans and the press. Smith also levied criticism in 1942 and 1943 against the slapstick comedy routines the team performed, the use of the Clown monikers, coupled with the painting of players' faces, and accused Pollock of profiting off racist stereotypes of indigenous Africans. That same year, Homestead Grays owner Cumberland Posey said that while he liked Pollock personally, he criticized his use of "Ethiopia" in the team's name, accusing him of capitalizing on the Second Italo-Ethiopian War, an event closely followed in Black newspapers. Pollock defended himself in 1942 from claims of negatively portraying Blacks by confirming that he was only the club's general manager, and that Hunter Campbell, a Black man, was the primary owner. On June 25, 1944, the Clowns walked off the field in the seventh inning of the second game of a double-header against the Memphis Red Sox following a disputed call from an umpire. League president J. B. Martin fined the club $250 ($4,572 in current dollar terms) and fined Clowns' manager Hoss Walker $50. Smith argued that the Clowns should be permanently suspended from the league. Smith wrote on July 15:

"Pollock and his mob have done little of significance to uplift the prestige of Negro baseball. They have quit in the middle of games, failed to appear for scheduled games, burlesqued Negro baseball and have been the greatest and most consistent advocates of "Uncle Tom" performances on the diamonds."

In March 1945, Smith wrote in Courier that the Clowns had been banned from playing at Briggs Stadium in Detroit and that Jack Marshall, an infielder for the club in 1944, had refused to play for the club "because of monkey-shines Owner Syd Pollock requires of his players."
