= Diocese of the Southeast =

Diocese of the Southeast can refer to:

- La Diócesis del Sudeste (the Diocese of the Southeast, aka the Diocese of Southeastern Mexico), of the Anglican Church of Mexico
- The Diocese of the Southeast (Reformed Episcopal Church)
