= William White (bishop of the Southeast) =

American Anglican bishop (born 1947)

The Right Reverend William J. White
- Bishop of the Southeast
- Church: Anglican Church in North America; Reformed Episcopal Church
- Diocese: REC Southeast
- In office: 2020–2022
- Predecessor: Alphonza Gadsden
- Successor: Willie J. Hill Jr.

Orders
- Consecration: January 17, 2009 by Leonard W. Riches

Personal details
- Born: 1947 (age 78–79) St. Stephen, South Carolina

William Joseph White (born 1947) is an American Anglican bishop who served as bishop ordinary of the Reformed Episcopal Church's Diocese of the Southeast.

== Biography ==
White was born in St. Stephen, South Carolina. He received his M.Div. from Cummins Theological Seminary in Summerville, South Carolina. He served several churches in the Diocese of the Southeast as a presbyter before being elected as suffragan bishop in the diocese.

On January 17, 2009, White was consecrated as the suffragan bishop of the Diocese of the Southeast at New Israel Reformed Episcopal Church in Charleston. REC Presiding Bishop Leonard W. Riches was the chief consecrator, joined by Sanco K. Rembert, Alphonza Gadsden, Royal U. Grote Jr., David L. Hicks, and Ray R. Sutton.

White was elected bishop coadjutor in 2015, and on December 12, 2020, he succeeded Gadsden as the eighth bishop ordinary of the Southeast. In September 2022, White retired. Bishop co-adjutor Willie J. Hill Jr. was installed to succeed White as the ninth bishop ordinary during the diocese's annual synod.

== Personal life ==
White married Vivian Jenkins in 1970; she died in 2018. They have two surviving children and one deceased child. In 2020, White was remarried to Gail Wilson.

Anglican Communion titles
| Preceded by Alphonza Gadsden | VIII REC Bishop of the Southeast; 2020–2022 | Next: Willie J. Hill Jr. |
