= Alphonza Gadsden =

American Anglican bishop (1945–2025)

The Right Reverend Alphonza Gadsden Sr.
- Bishop of the Southeast
- Church: Anglican Church in North America; Reformed Episcopal Church
- Diocese: REC Southeast
- In office: 2007–2020
- Predecessor: James C. West
- Successor: William White

Orders
- Consecration: November 11, 2007 by Leonard W. Riches

Personal details
- Born: December 13, 1945 Russellville, South Carolina, U.S.
- Died: January 17, 2025 (aged 79) Kingstree, South Carolina, U.S.

Alphonza Gadsden Sr. (December 13, 1945 – January 17, 2025) was an American Anglican bishop. From 2007 to 2020, he was bishop ordinary of the Reformed Episcopal Church's Diocese of the Southeast.

== Biography ==
Gadsden was born to Silas and Leola Gadsden in Russellville, South Carolina, and grew up in St. Stephen in the Reformed Episcopal Church. He graduated from Russellville High School. He served in the U.S. Army during the Vietnam War and reached the rank of sergeant. Gadsden received his undergraduate degree from Limestone University, his M.Div. from Cummins Theological Seminary, and did doctoral work at Erskine Theological Seminary, and was awarded the Doctor of Divinity, honoris causa from the Theological Commission of the Reformed Episcopal Church. He was married to Hester Brown Gadsden.

After his ordination, Gadsden served as vicar and rector of Liberty Reformed Episcopal Church in Jamestown, South Carolina. He later served as president of the Diocese of the Southeast's standing committee. While serving in ordained ministry, Gadsden had a 39-year career in the United States Postal Service and was the first black postmaster in Kingstree, South Carolina.

After the death of Bishop James C. West, Gadsden was elected bishop ordinary of the Diocese of the Southeast and consecrated by Leonard W. Riches on November 17, 2007. During his episcopacy, the diocese added eight clergy members, refurbished its properties, eliminated debts and added two additional parishes. In 2015, Gadsden hosted an Anglican Church in North America dialogue on racial reconciliation in the predominantly black Diocese of the Southeast. In 2020, Gadsden retired and was succeeded by William White as bishop ordinary.

Gadsden died on January 17, 2025, at the age of 79.

Anglican Communion titles
Preceded by James C. West	VII REC Bishop of the Southeast; 2007–2020	Succeeded by William White
