= Michelle Y. Green =

American author of children's literature

Michelle Y. Green is an American author of children’s literature. She graduated from the University of Maryland the Johns Hopkins Master's Program in Writing and teaches several courses, including one on writing children’s literature.

She has two sons, Bryan and Evan Green. Her historical fiction focuses on what she describes as “holes in history,” little-known yet extraordinary stories of African Americans and minority groups in the United States. Her childhood inspiration, read to her in school in Germany, was Laura Ingalls Wilder’s Little House on the Prairie. Her father was in the military and a member of the Tuskegee Airmen.

Her Willie Pearl series won a 1991 CRABbery Award (Prince George's Memorial Library) and a 1993 Children's Literary Award for Multicultural Publishing, and A Strong Right Arm was a Junior Library Guild selection and was praised by filmmaker Ken Burns. It was also nominated for the 2004 Rhode Island Children's Book Award. Booklist, in a starred review, said that "Johnson's ebullient personality and determination fairly leap off the page", and noted the "short, action packed chapters" and the occasional photos of Johnson and other players. Kirkus Reviews calls the book “at once unique, yet sadly representative of the hold racism had on every facet of society,” and that “Green has wisely allowed her to tell the story in her own voice… “ For that book, Green practiced various pitches and developed a close relationship with Mamie Johnson. The book is a biography written in the first person; Johnson wrote the book's introduction and describes how she and Green fortuitously met. Green’s earlier Willie Pearl series tells the story of Green’s own mother, and is set in a coal mining town in Kentucky during the Depression. Green's latest project is a book about African-American filmmaker Oscar Micheaux.

== Works ==
- A Strong Right Arm: The Story of Mamie "Peanut" Johnson (2002). Cover Illustratation by Kadir Nelson. ISBN 0-8037-2661-9

=== Willie Pearl ===
- Willie Pearl
- Willie Pearl: Field Day at Big Sandy
- Willie Pearl: Under the Mountain
