= Willie Hill =

American Anglican bishop

The Right Reverend Willie J. Hill Jr.
- Bishop Ordinary of the Southeast
- Church: Anglican Church in North America; Reformed Episcopal Church
- Diocese: REC Southeast
- In office: 2022–present
- Predecessor: William White
- Previous post: Rector of St. John's Reformed Episcopal Church (2013–22)

Orders
- Ordination: 1982 (diaconate); 1984 (priesthood)
- Consecration: 2022 by Foley Beach

Personal details
- Born: 1951 (age 74–75) Moncks Corner, South Carolina

Willie James Hill Jr. (born 1951) is an American Anglican bishop currently serving as bishop ordinary of the Reformed Episcopal Church's Diocese of the Southeast. He was previously rector of St. John's Reformed Episcopal Church in Charleston, South Carolina.

== Early life, education, and family ==
Hill was born in Moncks Corner to Willie J. Hill Sr. and Gladys Hill and raised in the Reformed Episcopal Church. He married Gale in 1974 and has three adult children and six grandchildren. Hill studied at Reformed Episcopal Seminary in Philadelphia and received degrees from Cummins Memorial Theological Seminary in Summerville, South Carolina, in 1981, as well as from Eastern University in St. Davids, Pennsylvania.

== Ordained ministry ==
Hill began ordained ministry in 1982 in the Reformed Episcopal Church and served parishes in Pennsylvania and South Carolina.

He was appointed rector of St. John's Reformed Episcopal Church in 2013 and launched new initiatives to engage the surrounding Ansonborough community. “The truth is there is no vision for a future if we maintain that mindset,” he said. “That is one of the symptoms of a dying church.” He welcomed visiting college gospel choirs to sing in St. John's sanctuary and added a midday Bible study for elderly members who could not travel to evening events.

== Episcopal ministry ==
On 28 February 2022, Hill was elected bishop co-adjutor with the right to succeed Bishop Ordinary William White upon his retirement. Hill's election received consent from the Anglican Church in North America College of Bishops on 13 June 2022, and he was consecrated on 13 August 2022 at Grace Reformed Episcopal Church in Moncks Corner. ACNA Archbishop Foley Beach was the chief consecrator, and REC Presiding Bishop Ray Sutton was the consecration preacher. In September 2022, White retired and Sutton installed Hill as bishop ordinary during the diocese's annual synod.

Anglican Communion titles
Preceded by William White	IX REC Bishop of the Southeast; 2022–present	Incumbent
