= St. John's Reformed Episcopal Church =

Coordinates: 32°47′11″N 79°55′55″W

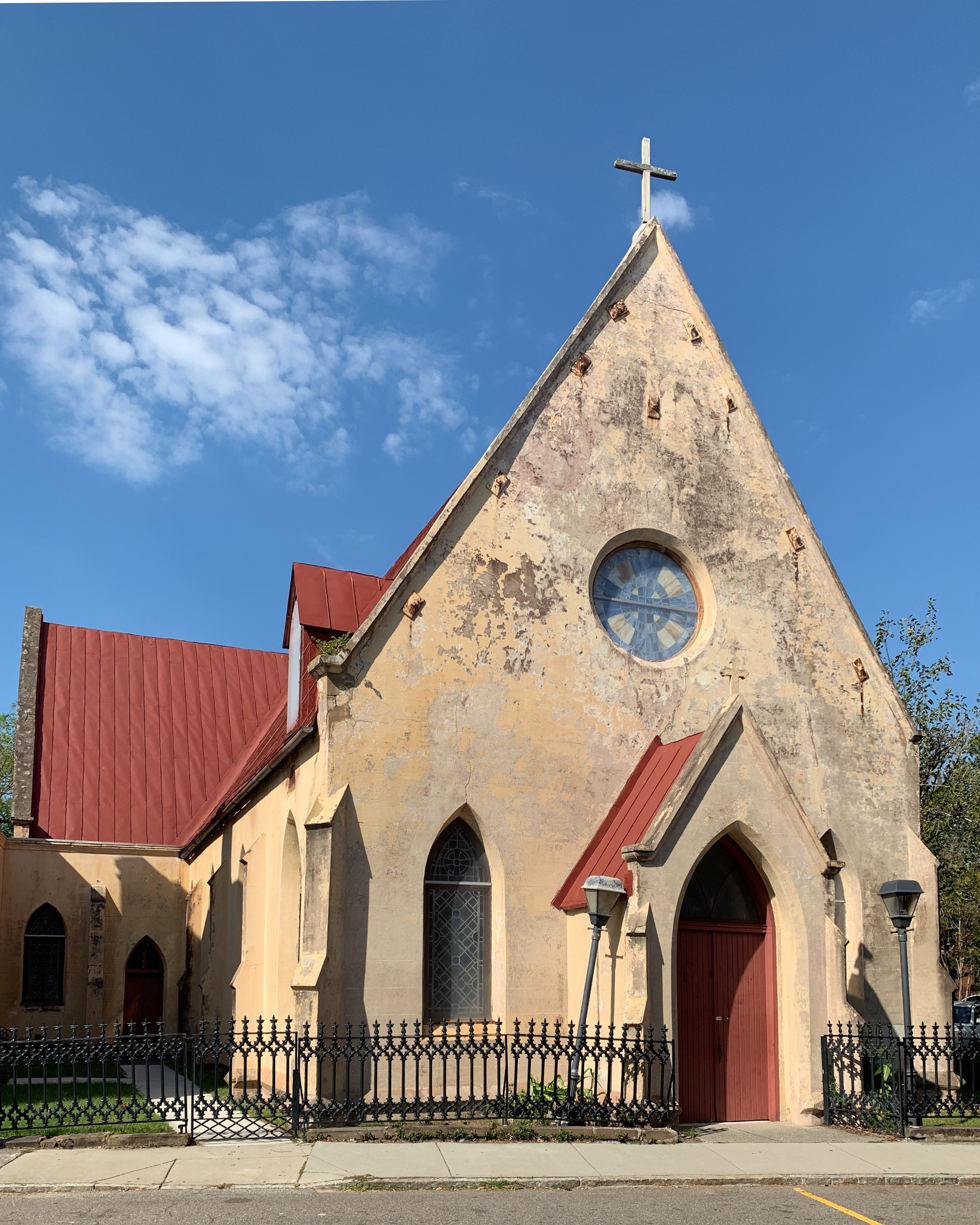
- Location: 91 Anson Street, Charleston, South Carolina
- Country: United States
- Denomination: Anglican Church in North America

History
- Founded: 1906
- Dedicated: 1850

Architecture
- Style: Gothic Revival

Administration
- Diocese: Reformed Episcopal Diocese of the Southeast

Clergy
- Rector: The Rev. Kenneth G. Shaw

St. John's Reformed Episcopal Church is a historic African-American Anglican church in Charleston, South Carolina. Founded in 1906 and occupying a building built in 1850, the church is a member of the Reformed Episcopal Church's Diocese of the Southeast.

== History ==
The building currently owned by St. John's was built at 91-93 Anson Street as the Anson Street Chapel in 1850 by a group of free and slave black Presbyterians. It was the site of an 1857 revival in Charleston. The house next door was used as a manse. The church was heavily damaged by shelling during the siege of Charleston, and the church was rebuilt and restored in the 1880s. Next door, a board-and-batten school building was completed by 1887.

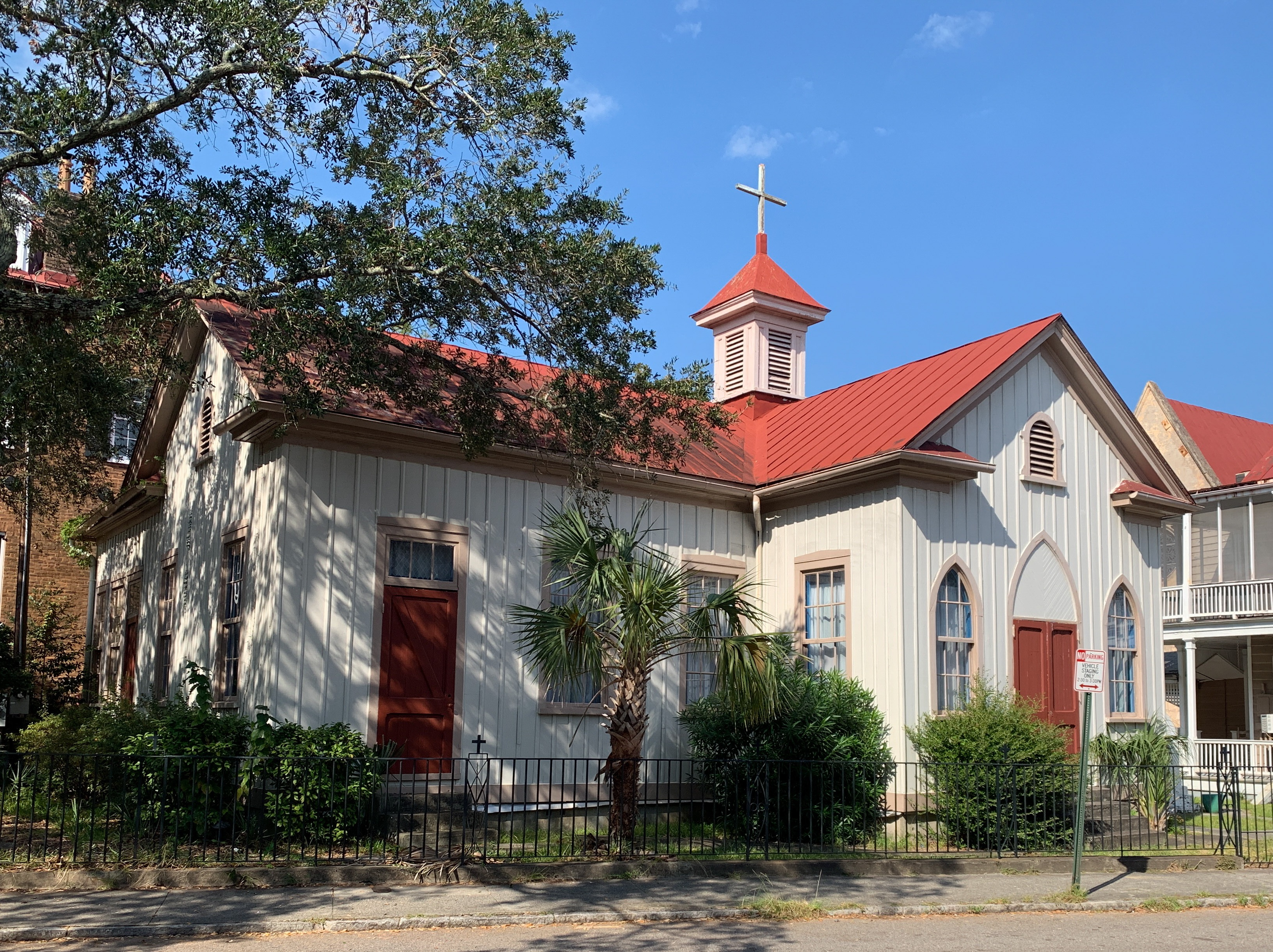
The St. John's school building at 91 Anson Street

The Presbyterians relocated and the building passed to the Catholic Diocese of Charleston, which used the building until 1965. St. John's was founded in 1906 at 43 Elizabeth Street in Charleston. In 1971, the church moved to its current location. The Diocese of the Southeast, formed by freedmen who had left the Episcopal Diocese of South Carolina due to racism and exclusion, was predominantly black and St. John's new location in Ansonborough was likewise predominantly African-American. Most of St. John's parishioners starting in the 1970s came from the church's immediate neighborhood. However, by the late 2010s, Ansonborough and the Charleston Peninsula had been substantially gentrified, with most of St. John's black parishioners commuting from West Ashley.

Ronald Satterfield, who was pastor of St. John's from 2000 to 2012, was convicted and sentenced to 18 months in prison for bank fraud after forging the church secretary's name to acquire a $250,000 bank loan and running what federal authorities called a $3.3 million Ponzi scheme that lost church members' money.

The Rt. Rev. Willie Hill Jr. was appointed rector in 2013 and launched new initiatives to engage the community. He welcomed visiting college gospel choirs to sing in St. John's sanctuary and added a midday Bible study for elderly members who cannot travel to evening events. Hill was elected bishop coadjutor of the Diocese of the Southeast in 2022.

== Architecture ==
The 1880s renovation of the church added transepts, a Gothic frame ceiling and 14 stained glass windows. According to the Historic Charleston Foundation, "the St. John's congregation has retained most of the structure's interior features, including stenciled decoration and gilded Gothic elements."

On the grounds of the church is a commemorative landscaped garden in honor of church member Philip Simmons, a notable Charleston ironworker. Simmons designed the "Heart Gate" that marks the entry to the garden.
