= Hank Baylis =

American baseball player

- Infielder
- Born: February 8, 1923; Kansas City, Missouri, U.S.
- Died: December 17, 1989 (aged 66); Kansas City, Missouri, U.S.
- Batted: Right Threw: Right

MLB debut
- 1948, for the Chicago American Giants

Last MLB appearance
- 1948, for the Chicago American Giants

MLB statistics
- Batting average: .429
- Home runs: 0
- Runs batted in: 3
- Stats at Baseball Reference

Teams
- Chicago American Giants (1948)

Henry Baylis (February 8, 1923 – December 17, 1980) was an American Negro league infielder in the 1940s and 1950s.

A native of Kansas City, Missouri, Baylis broke into the Negro leagues in 1948 with the Chicago American Giants. He went on to play for the Birmingham Black Barons the following two seasons, and finished his Negro leagues career with his hometown Kansas City Monarchs from 1951 to 1955. In 1952 and 1953, Baylis was selected to play in the East–West All-Star Game. Baylis is credited with giving Mamie Johnson the nickname "Peanut" when he faced her in her first professional game for the Indianapolis Clowns in 1953; Baylis promptly struck out.

In 1956 and 1957, Baylis played minor league baseball. He played for the El Paso Texans in 1956, and split time in 1957 between El Paso and the Yakima Bears and Tucson Cowboys. Baylis died in Kansas City in 1980 at age 57.
