= Martha Ackmann =

American author (born 1951)

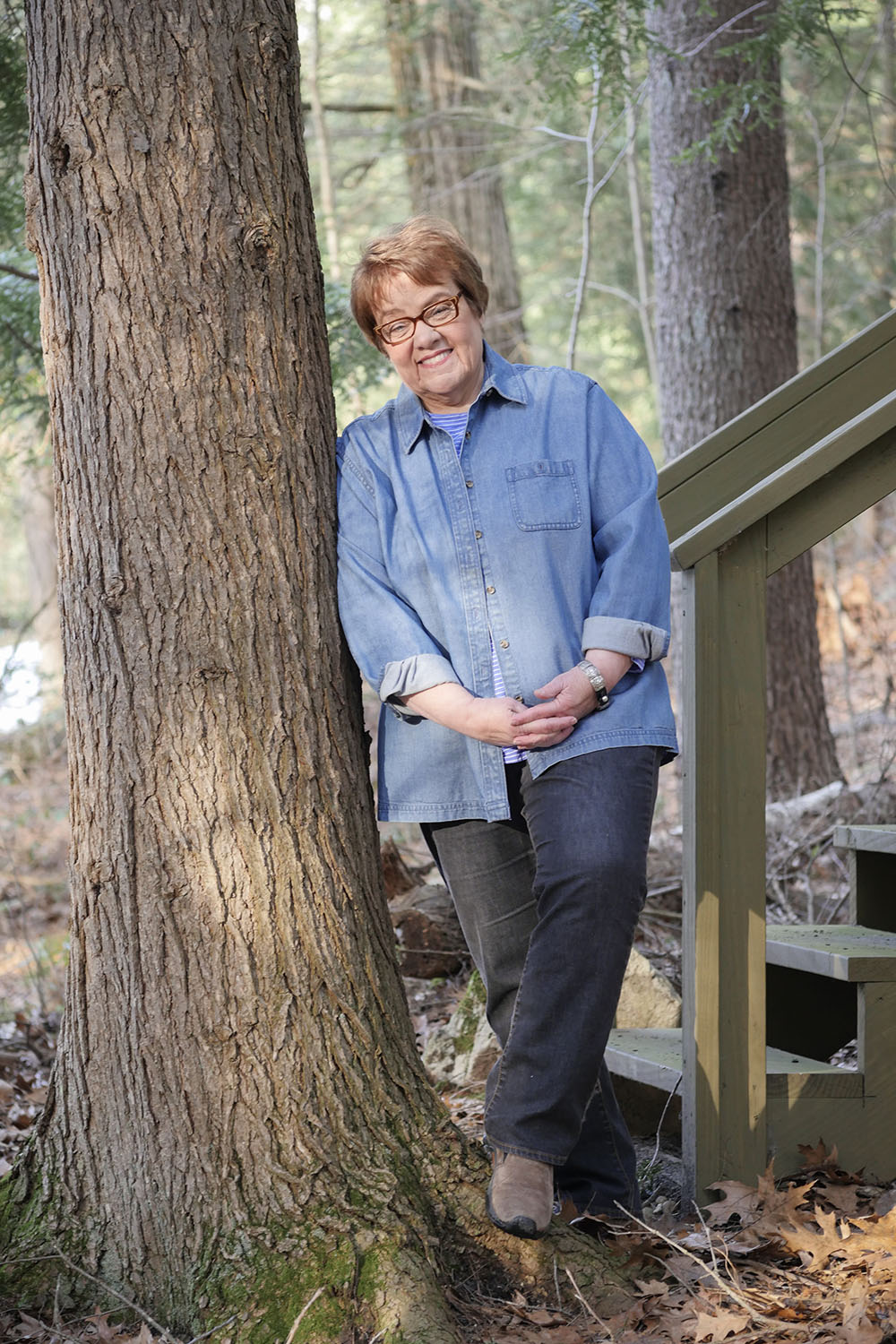
- Ackmann in 2019
- Born: February 11, 1951 (age 75); St. Louis, Missouri, US
- Education: Lindenwood College; Middlebury College; University of Massachusetts Amherst
- Writing career
- Genre: Nonfiction
- Notable awards: Guggenheim Fellowship

Martha Ackmann (born February 11, 1951) is an American author. Her books include The Mercury 13: The True Story of Thirteen Women and the Dream of Space Flight (2003), Curveball: The Remarkable Story of Toni Stone (2010), and These Fevered Days: Ten Pivotal Moments in the Making of Emily Dickinson (2020), and Ain’t Nobody’s Fool: the Life and Times of Dolly Parton (December 2025). Ackmann's essays and columns have appeared in publications including The Atlantic, The New York Times, the Washington Post, and Paris Review. She has been a frequent commentator for New England Public Radio.

== Personal life ==
Ackmann was born in St. Louis and was raised in Florissant, Missouri.

She graduated from McCluer High School and received her BA from Lindenwood College, her MA from Middlebury College’s Bread Loaf School of English, and her PhD from the University of Massachusetts. She also completed graduate work at Lincoln College, Oxford University.

== Career ==
Ackmann was on the faculty in the Gender Studies department at Mount Holyoke College from 1986 - 2016. For nearly two decades, she taught a seminar on Emily Dickinson in the poet’s house in Amherst, Massachusetts. She is a past president of the Emily Dickinson International Society and co-founder of Legacy: A Journal of American Women Writers.

Ackmann’s books focus on "women who’ve changed America," with special attention to recovering stories of women who have fallen between the cracks of history. Her first book, The Mercury 13, detailed the largely unknown story of thirteen American women pilots who were secretly tested to be astronauts in the early days of the US space program. The book was selected for college and university Common Read programs. In 2007, the University of Wisconsin–Oshkosh awarded the Mercury 13 women honorary degrees and commended Ackmann for embodying "the ideas of social justice and equity in the public sphere."

Ackmann's second book, Curveball, tells the story of Toni Stone, the first woman to play baseball in the Negro leagues. When Henry Aaron moved from the Indianapolis Clowns to the major leagues, Toni Stone replaced him. A fierce second baseman, Stone played against Ernie Banks, Willie Mays, Buck O’Neil, and Jackie Robinson. Producer Samantha Barrie optioned Ackmann's book for the stage, playwright Lydia R. Diamond wrote Toni Stone, and Pam MacKinnon directed the Roundabout Theatre Company production. The play had its world premiere in 2019 at the Laura Pels Theatre in New York and received widespread acclaim. The New York Times called April Matthis's portrayal of Toni Stone "sensational" and named the play a Critic's Pick.

Ackmann's third book, These Fevered Days, examines ten turning points in Emily Dickinson's life. Kirkus Reviews praised the book's "radiant prose, palpable descriptions, and deep empathy for the poet’s sensibility [that] make this biography extraordinary." The New Yorker called the book "a vivid, affectionate chronicle."

Ackmann has presented lectures in Europe and across the United States. Her talks include readings and lectures on women in space, sports equity, and American women writers. Presentations include talks at the Kennedy Space Center, Chicago's Adler Planetarium, the National Baseball Hall of Fame, the Roundabout Theatre, and New York's 92nd Street Y. Ackmann's media appearances include the Today show, CNN, CBS Evening News, NPR, and the BBC.

== Awards and honors ==
Ackmann is a Guggenheim Fellow. She was the Augustus Anton Whitney Fellow in nonfiction at the Radcliffe Institute for Advanced Study at Harvard University.

== Selected works ==
=== Books ===
- The Mercury 13: The True Story of Thirteen Women and the Dream of Space Flight (Random House 2003)
- Curveball: The Remarkable Story of Toni Stone, First Woman to Play Professional Baseball in the Negro League (Chicago Review Press 2010)
- These Fevered Days: Ten Pivotal Moments in the Making of Emily Dickinson (W. W. Norton & Co. February 2020)
