= Bill Pinkney =

American performer and singer (1925–2007)

Background information
- Born: Willie Pinkney; August 15, 1925; Dalzell, South Carolina, U.S.
- Died: July 4, 2007 (aged 81) Daytona Beach, Florida, U.S.
- Genres: Rhythm and blues, beach music
- Occupations: Performer and singer
- Website: originaldrifters.com

Willie "Bill" Pinkney (August 15, 1925 – July 4, 2007) was an American performer and singer. Pinkney was the last surviving original member of The Drifters, who achieved international fame with numerous hit records. He was chiefly responsible for its early sounds. The Drifters have had a strong influence on soul, rhythm and blues, and rock and roll music. As an original group member, Bill Pinkney was a 1988 inductee into the Rock & Roll Hall of Fame with The Drifters.

== Early life ==
Born Willie Pinkney in Dalzell, South Carolina, Pinkney grew up singing his favorite music, gospel, in his church choir. He was raised in a Christian home, and was a member of Mount Olive AME Church. He served in the United States Army in World War II. He earned a Presidential Citation with five service stars (for battles including Normandy and Bastogne under General Patton). Returning from the war, Pinkney began to sing again in various gospel choirs. There, he met and joined with the men who became the original members of the Drifters.

== The Drifters ==
Bill Pinkney, brothers Andrew and Gerhart Thrasher, and bass singer Willie Ferbee were approached by Clyde McPhatter, who had just quit as the lead tenor of the popular R&B group Billy Ward and his Dominoes. McPhatter proposed that they create a new group to record for Atlantic Records. On their first record "Money Honey", Pinkney, a natural bass-baritone with a multi-octave range, sang first tenor.

After Ferbee left, Pinkney switched to the bass part, in which he was heard on "Honey Love", "White Christmas", "Adorable", "Ruby Baby", and many other early Drifters recordings. In 1954, the Drifters recorded their version of "White Christmas" by Irving Berlin. That version was featured in the 1990 movie Home Alone, as well as the 1994 movie The Santa Clause. Pinkney can also be heard singing lead on the 1956 recording "I Should Have Done Right" and 1955's "Steamboat". Pinkney was in and out of the group from 1956 through 1958. He did not participate in the recording of later hits like "Fools Fall in Love" and "Drip Drop", which featured bass singer Tommy Evans.

After Pinkney's permanent departure, The Drifters recorded hit classics such as "Under the Boardwalk", "Save the Last Dance for Me", "There Goes My Baby", "Up on the Roof", and "On Broadway", with a completely new line-up.

== Solo career and reformation of The Drifters ==
In 1958, George Treadwell, the group manager fired all of the individual Drifters and hired all new singers, The Crowns (formally known as the Five Crowns), signing them under the Drifters' name. Pinkney was forced to leave. Pinkney quickly created a group called the Original Drifters, made up of key members of the first (1953–58) association. Pinkney's Original Drifters was consistently popular throughout the southeastern United States. For decades, their music was a staple of the "beach music" scene.

Leaders such as President Bill Clinton and President Nelson Mandela of South Africa recognized Pinkney's contributions. Pinkney received many musical awards, including the Rhythm and Blues Foundation Pioneer Award, and was inducted into the Vocal Group Hall of Fame, the Rock and Roll Hall of Fame, United Group Harmony Association, and the Beach Music Hall of Fame.

He was selected for the South Carolina Black Hall of Fame and given a "key to the state", which proclaimed May 14 as Bill Pinkney Day. The cities of Sumter, Bamberg, and Myrtle Beach (all South Carolina), each presented its "key to the city" to Pinkney. In 2001, the South Carolina Department of Education honored Pinkney in its African-American History Month calendar alongside Merl Code, Tom Feelings, Mamie Johnson, Sanco Rembert, and other notable black South Carolinians. He was honored by the United States Senate and the United States House of Representatives. In 2002, Pinkney received an Honorary Doctorate of Fine Music from Coastal Carolina University.

== Death ==
Pinkney died at the age of 81, on July 4, 2007, in Daytona Beach, Florida, from a heart attack, while staying at the Daytona Beach Hilton. Funeral services were held on July 9, 2007, at the Sumter County Exhibition Center in Sumter, South Carolina. Pinkney was buried at St. Luke's AME Church in Sumter.
