= William Jerdan Jr. =

American Reformed Episcopal bishop (d. 2001)

The Right Reverend William H. S. Jerdan Jr. D.D.
- Presiding Bishop of the Reformed Episcopal Church
- Church: Reformed Episcopal Church
- Diocese: Southeast
- In office: 1987–1990
- Predecessor: Theophilus Herter
- Successor: Franklin Sellers
- Previous posts: Bishop ordinary, Diocese of the Southeast (1960–1987)

Orders
- Consecration: May 27, 1960 by Howard D. Higgins

Personal details
- Born: c. 1915 Philadelphia, Pennsylvania, United States
- Died: March 29, 2001 (aged 85) Summerville, South Carolina, United States

William Henry Stuart Jerdan Jr. (c. 1915 – March 29, 2001) was an American Reformed Episcopal bishop. He was the presiding bishop of the Reformed Episcopal Church (REC) from 1987 to 1990 and bishop ordinary of the church's jurisdiction in the Southeastern United States from 1960 to 1987.

== Biography ==
Jerdan was born in Philadelphia and graduated from Temple University with his M.Div. In the 1943, he began a prayer group in Northeast Philadelphia that within four years became Calvary Reformed Episcopal Church. In 1958, Jerdan was sent to Summerville, South Carolina, as field director for the REC's Missionary Jurisdiction of the South. In 1960, he was set apart as a bishop for the jurisdiction, which he served for the next 26 years. The jurisdiction formally became the Charleston, Atlanta and Charlotte Synod in 1973 and then the Diocese of the Southeast following the reorganization of the REC into dioceses in 1984.

In 1987, Jerdan was elected to a three-year term as presiding bishop. He stepped down as diocesan bishop and was succeeded by Sanco Rembert, the first African-American REC bishop, who served the predominantly black Diocese of the Southeast.

Jerdan died in 2001 in Summerville. He was survived by his wife Eleanor, five sons and a daughter.

Religious titles
Preceded by Joseph E. Kearney	Bishop of the Southeast; 1960–1987	Succeeded by Sanco Rembert
Preceded by Theophilus Herter	Presiding Bishop of the Reformed Episcopal Church; 1987–1990	Succeeded by Franklin Sellers
