= Toni Stone =

Female Negro League baseball player (1921–1996)

- Second baseman
- Born: July 17, 1921; Bluefield, West Virginia, U.S.
- Died: November 2, 1996 (aged 75); Alameda, California, U.S.
- Batted: Right Threw: Right

Negro leagues debut
- 1953, for the Indianapolis Clowns

Last Negro leagues appearance
- 1954, for the Kansas City Monarchs

Teams
- Indianapolis Clowns (1953); Kansas City Monarchs (1954)

Toni Stone (July 17, 1921 – November 2, 1996), born as Marcenia Lyle Stone, was an American female professional baseball player who played in predominantly male leagues. In 1953, she became the first woman to play as a regular on an American major-level professional baseball team when she joined the Indianapolis Clowns in the previously all-male Negro leagues. (Two other women, Mamie 'Peanut' Johnson and Connie Morgan, would later play on the team). A baseball player from her early childhood, she also played for the San Francisco Sea Lions, the New Orleans Creoles, and the Kansas City Monarchs before retiring from baseball in 1954. Stone was taunted at times by teammates, once being told, "Go home and fix your husband some biscuits", but she was undeterred. It was reported that during an exhibition game in 1953, she hit a single off a fastball pitch delivered by legendary player Satchel Paige, although the claim has failed verification.

== Early life ==
Born in West Virginia to Boykin and Willa Maynard Stone, Toni Stone had two sisters and a brother. Her father was a barber, a graduate of Tuskegee Institute, who also served in the United States Army during World War I. He married hairdresser Willa Maynard.

Stone was ten years old when her family moved to the Rondo neighborhood of Saint Paul, Minnesota, and her parents opened the Boykin's Barber and Beauty Shop. She enjoyed playing baseball with boys in the neighborhood, and earned the nickname "Tomboy". Her mother, who was worried that baseball was not ladylike, bought a pair of figure skates for Stone. Although she performed well in a city-wide competition, her interest lay with baseball. Reportedly, softball was not "fast enough" for her interest. Various reports record skill at swimming, track, basketball, and even football. At school, she wore pants instead of skirts and was teased for her preferences. Reportedly, she often skipped school to play baseball.

It was not that Stone did not enjoy intellectual work –she was an avid library patron and reader of The Chicago Defender. She simply did not find that the content she was taught in school was reflective of her reality.

The family's Catholic priest recognized her strength as a pitcher and encouraged her to try out for the Claver Catholic Church boys' baseball team in the Catholic Midget League (which is similar to today's Little League). Because it was a church activity, her parents consented to her participation. Unfortunately, the coach was uninterested in cultivating her skill, so Stone taught herself by reading rule books. In hopes of learning to be a better player, Stone joined the girls' softball team, HighLex, but was dissatisfied with play in that sport. Still searching for instruction, Stone would show up and watch the baseball school run by the St. Paul Saints' manager, Gabby Street. "I just couldn't get rid of her until I gave her a chance," Street told Ebony Magazine in an interview. "Every time I chased her away, she would go around the corner and come back to plague me again."

By age 16, Stone was playing weekend games with the barnstorming Twin City Colored Giants. She was paid $2–3 a game, so her parents let her play. She eventually dropped out of high school with the hope of making a living playing baseball. In 1943 she moved to San Francisco where her sister lived.

Making a living on odd jobs while living in the Fillmore District, she took on the name "Toni Stone", which she felt was a better fit for her identity than "Marcenia". At Jack's Tavern, the first Black-owned nightclub in the neighborhood, she met Captain Aurelious Pescia Alberga, a native of Oakland and a WWI veteran. They married in 1950. While he continued to live in the San Francisco Bay Area as Stone pursued her career on baseball teams around the country, they remained married until he died at the age of 103 in the 1980s.

== Baseball career ==
Spending time at Jack's Tavern on Sutter, Stone became friends with one of the owners, Alroyd "Al" Love. Love introduced her to the local American Legion Baseball team, which was part of the national network of amateur baseball teams for teenagers. Stone had unofficially played some ball with an American Legion team in Minnesota. In San Francisco, because of age limits for the American Legion teams, Stone subtracted ten years from her age, claiming to be 17 instead of 27. She played with the team in San Francisco from 1943 to 1945.

Stone talked her way onto the roster of the San Francisco Sea Lions by spring of 1949. The 1946 failure of the short-lived West Coast Negro Baseball Association, of which the Sea Lions had been a member, inspired owners Hal King and Harold Morris to take a chance on Stone's argument that she would draw crowds. She batted in two runs in her first time up. At the time, the Sea Lions were barnstorming around the country, so the work was hard. Stone soon became discontented with the owner of the Sea Lions after she discovered she was paid less than her male teammates. Stone joined the New Orleans Creoles (1949–1952).

For the 1953 season, Stone was signed by Syd Pollock, owner of the Indianapolis Clowns, to play second base, the position Hank Aaron had played for the team before joining the Milwaukee Braves (now the Atlanta Braves). Pollock reportedly had been trying to hire Stone for the Indianapolis Clowns since the close of the 1950 baseball season. While the media reported that she finally agreed to sign on for a staggering $12,000 for the season, many sources identify that figure as an untruth for publicity purposes. Other reports are that Pollock wanted Stone to play in a skirt or in shorts, and she refused, though she did wear a foam rubber chest protector. Pollock was a partner in several business ventures with Abe Saperstein, owner of the Harlem Globetrotters, and also one of the co-founders of the West Coast Negro Baseball Association. Similar to the trick basketball team, The Clowns both provided clown-style entertainment at games and played serious ball. Having a woman on the team attracted more spectators, but Stone also played seriously. She played 50 games in her season with the Clowns, batting .243.

The newspapers at the time claimed that attendance at Clowns' games hit record levels when she started playing, and she was heavily featured on the team's promotional materials.

=== Impact of racial segregation and sexism ===
Although there was a baseball league for women, the All American Girls Professional Baseball League, it remained unofficially segregated, claiming that only White women met their exacting beauty standards.

Stone was the first female player in the Negro Leagues, and she was not met with open arms. Bunny Downs, manager of the Clowns, had reportedly once told Stone that "she'd better stick to knitting and home cooking," but publicly claimed to be won over after seeing her play. Most of the male ball players shunned her and gave her a hard time because she was a woman. Stone was quite proud of the fact that the male players were out to get her. She would show off the scars on her left wrist and remember the time she had been spiked by a runner trying to take out the woman standing on second base. "He was out," she recalled.

Even though she was part of the team, she was not allowed in the locker room. If she was lucky, she would be allowed to change in the umpire's locker room. Once, Stone was asked to wear a skirt while playing for sex appeal, but she would not do it. Even though she felt like she was "one of the guys," the people around her did not. While playing for the Kansas City Monarchs, she spent most of the game on the bench, next to the men who hated her. "It was hell," she said.

=== Retirement ===
Stone's contract was sold to the Kansas City Monarchs prior to the 1954 season, and she retired following the season because of lack of playing time.

== Post-baseball life and death ==
After the 1954 season, Stone moved to Oakland, California, to work as a nurse and care for her sick husband.

Toni Stone died on November 2, 1996, of heart failure at a nursing home in Alameda, California. She was 75 years old.

== Legacy ==
All of Stone's accomplishments make her "one of the best players you have never heard of", according to the Negro League Baseball Players Association.

In 1990, she was included in two exhibits at the Baseball Hall of Fame, one on "Women in Baseball" and another on "Negro League Baseball". In 1993, Stone was inducted into the Women's Sports Hall of Fame, as well as the International Women's Sports Hall of Fame. In 1990, Stone's hometown of Saint Paul, Minnesota, declared March 6 "Toni Stone Day". Saint Paul also has a field named after Toni Stone located at the Dunning Baseball Complex.

In 2020 and 2021, the Society for American Baseball Research nominated Stone for the Dorothy Seymour Mills Lifetime Achievement Award.

On February 9, 2022, Google honored Stone's legacy and achievements by making her the Google Doodle on their homepage. The image depicts Stone fielding a baseball from her second base position and throwing the ball in the direction of first base, as the opposing team's runner crosses in front of her in the direction of second base. The Doodle was created by San Francisco-based illustrator and animation director, Monique Wray.

Stone was included in MLB The Show 24.

== In popular media ==
=== Misconceptions ===
Various biographic elements of Stone's life were fabricated for the popular media, apparently for marketing purposes. Stone's purported $12,000 annual signing salary with the Clowns, which Pollock claimed was more than Jackie Robinson's first major-league contract, was more likely around $350 to $400 a month. The Clowns' publicists touted her bachelor's degree from Macalester College—Stone also dropped ten years from her age in order to join a team for teenagers in San Francisco, and retained the lower age on her baseball resume.

The Society for American Baseball Research has looked particularly closely at Stone's claim that she got a hit off Satchel Paige, of the St. Louis Browns, on Easter Sunday in 1953. While no one has disproven the claim entirely, during the spring training when the exhibition game purportedly happened, there is no record of the Browns playing the Clowns.

Passing of information on Stone from source to source has distorted some details of her life. Newspaper articles claim that she "graduated from Roosevelt High School," while others write that "after completing grammar school, she entered Roosevelt High." Other sources name other high schools altogether. Other sources say she dropped out of high school.

Among many other claims, researchers cannot verify whether or not she played for the New Orleans Black Pelicans.

=== Theater ===
In 1996, the Great American History Theater in Saint Paul, Minnesota, staged Roger Nieboer's Tomboy Stone soon after Stone's death, though it was not a critical success.

Almost twenty years later, Toni Stone, written by Lydia Diamond under commission from the Roundabout Theater Company and Samantha Barrie and premiering Off-Broadway in 2019, was based on Martha Ackmann's full-length biography, Curveball: The Remarkable Story of Toni Stone. The play addresses Stone's baseball career, as well as the challenges that she faced as a black woman. Within a year of its publication, the play had been staged by several theaters around the country, though the COVID-19 pandemic did inhibit its production.

== See also ==
- Connie Morgan
- Mamie Johnson
- Tiffany Brooks
- Women in baseball
