= Russellville, South Carolina =

- Census-designated place
- Location within South Carolina Location within the United States
- Coordinates: 33°23′49″N 79°57′49″W
- Country: United States
- State: South Carolina
- County: Berkeley

Area
  - Total: 3.75 sq mi (9.70 km^{2})
  - Land: 3.75 sq mi (9.70 km^{2})
  - Water: 0 sq mi (0.00 km^{2})
- Elevation: 79 ft (24 m)

Population (2020)
  - Total: 380
  - Density: 101.5/sq mi (39.18/km^{2})
- Time zone: UTC-5 (Eastern (EST))
  - Summer (DST): UTC-4 (EDT)
- ZIP code: 29479
- Area codes: 843, 854
- GNIS feature ID: 2629836

Russellville is a census-designated place and unincorporated community in Berkeley County, South Carolina, United States. Its population was 488 as of the 2010 census.

== Demographics ==
Historical population
Census	Pop.	Note	%±
2020	380		—
U.S. Decennial Census
