= Sanco Rembert =

First black bishop in the Reformed Episcopal Church (1922–2015)

The Right Reverend Sanco K. Rembert
- Bishop of the Southeast
- Church: Reformed Episcopal Church
- Diocese: REC Southeast
- In office: 1987–1998
- Predecessor: William Jerdan Jr.
- Successor: James C. West

Orders
- Ordination: 1951 (diaconate); 1953 (priesthood)
- Consecration: May 26, 1966 by Howard D. Higgins

Personal details
- Born: November 11, 1922 Pineville, South Carolina, U.S.
- Died: August 14, 2015 (aged 92) Columbia, South Carolina, U.S.

Sanco King Rembert (November 11, 1922–August 14, 2015) was an American Anglican bishop notable for being the first African-American bishop of the Reformed Episcopal Church. Consecrated in 1966 to assist in the REC's Missionary Jurisdiction of the South, he served from 1987 to 1998 as bishop ordinary of the Diocese of the Southeast. Since Rembert, all bishops ordinary in the Diocese of the Southeast have been black.

== Biography ==
Rembert was born in 1922, one of 14 children of the Rev. Samuel Edward Rembert and the former Rozella L. Middleton of Pineville, South Carolina. He earned a B.S. in chemistry and mathematics from Benedict College in Columbia, South Carolina, in 1945. While working toward acceptance to medical school, he worked as a private detective in New York City. In 1947, however, Rembert had a conversion experience, later saying that “the Lord touched me, and suddenly I felt I should be arresting souls for the Lord, instead of arresting criminals in society.” Rembert studied theology at New York Theological Seminary, receiving an M.Div. in 1951 and an S.T.M. in 1965.

Rembert was ordained as a deacon in the Reformed Episcopal Church in 1951 and as a presbyter in 1953, and he served as rector at several churches in the Reformed Episcopal Church's Jurisdiction of the South (later known as the Charleston, Atlanta and Charlotte Synod and eventually as the Diocese of the Southeast). He was the founding rector of New Israel Reformed Episcopal Church in Charleston in 1959.

In 1965, Rembert was elected assistant missionary bishop in the southern jurisdiction. He was consecrated in May 1966. In 1970, in conjunction with the southern jurisdiction's preparations for admission as a full synod in the Reformed Episcopal Church, Rembert was elected bishop coadjutor with the right to succeed William Jerdan Jr. as bishop ordinary. At this point, Rembert took on several administrative duties as well as responsibility for episcopal visitations and relationships with clergy, including counseling. In 1979, he reopened Cummins Memorial Theological Seminary, the seminary of the synod that had been temporarily closed.

Rembert succeeded Jerdan as bishop ordinary in 1987 and served until his retirement in 1998. As bishop, Rembert continued serving concurrently as rector of New Israel R.E. Church. He presided over the rebuilding of the diocese's Bishop Jerdan Conference Center after Hurricane Hugo; renovation or reconstruction of most of the churches in the diocese, and church planting that brought the number of churches in the diocese from 27 to 38. He also served as He also served as vice president of the REC's General Council from 1990 to 1999.

Rembert was first vice president of Jenkins Orphanage, superintendent of the New Israel Child Development and Christian School, co-chairman of the Charleston Education Alliance, chaplain of Charleston County Hospital, organizer and president of the Charleston Upper Peninsula Revitalization Association, and president, dean and professor at Cummins Memorial Theological Seminary. In March 2000, South Carolina Governor Jim Hodges appointed Rembert to the South Carolina Board of Paroles and Pardons. In 1966, Rembert became the first black member of the Charleston Ministerial Association.

== Personal life ==
Rembert was married to Carrie Mae Brooks until her death in 2012. They had two daughters.

Rembert retired to Columbia, South Carolina, in 2003. In 2013, after his first wife's death, Rembert married Patricia Simmons Singleton. He died in Columbia on August 14, 2015, at the age of 92.

== Legacy ==
In the Reformed Episcopal Church, Rembert was an advocate of greater racial inclusion. After the Missionary Jurisdiction of the South had been elevated to the status of a synod at the church's 41st General Council in 1975, Rembert noted that there had never been a council sermon delivered by a minister from the predominantly black southern jurisdiction and urged greater participation by Southeastern Reformed Episcopal churchmen in the future.

In 2001, the South Carolina Department of Education honored Rembert in its African-American History Month calendar alongside Merl Code, Tom Feelings, Mamie Johnson, Bill Pinkney, and other notable black South Carolinians.

In 2022, Cummins Seminary honored Rembert by creating the Bishop Sanco K. Rembert Memorial Lecture. Poet and New Testament scholar Bonnie Thurston was the first Rembert lecturer.

Anglican Communion titles
Preceded by William Jerdan Jr.	V REC Bishop of the Southeast; 1987–1998	Succeeded by James C. West
