= Zulu Cannibal Giants =

American novelty baseball team

Information
- League: Independent (1934–1937)
- Location: Louisville, Kentucky
- Established: 1934
- Disbanded: 1937

The Zulu Cannibal Giants were an American Negro league baseball team (they referred to themselves as a Baseball "Zulu Tribe", based on a concept inspired by the war in Ethiopia), formed in 1934 by Charlie Henry in Louisville, Kentucky.

== Background ==
The Zulu Cannibal Giants gained notoriety for their propensity to turn a baseball game into a comedy performance, much in the same way that the Harlem Globetrotters did with basketball many years later. The Zulu Cannibal Giants decorated their faces and bodies with African tribal paint, went shirtless, wore only grass skirts, used special custom-made baseball bats crafted to supposedly resemble Ethiopian war clubs, and always played barefoot. The players did not use their real names, but rather played under "native" names, as shown in a game lineup from 1935 listing: "Wahoo, right field, Limpopo, first base," among others.

Promoter Syd Pollock's booking agency scheduled games for the Cannibal Giants in 1935. Pollock also managed a similar novelty team called the Indianapolis Clowns (also known as the Cincinnati Clowns, and the Ethiopian Clowns).

Popularly regarded as a Negro league team, they technically were not accepted members of the formal league.

== Controversy ==
Although the team was extremely popular with the public, some black athletes disapproved of the Cannibals because of the stereotype. The team "shows the depths people would go to exploit African-Americans," says author Phil Dixon. A popular player, John "Buck" O'Neil, wrote in his autobiography that, "looking back on it, the idea of playing with the Cannibal Giants was very demeaning".
