= Connie Morgan =

American baseball player (1935–1996)

- Second Base
- Born: October 17, 1935; Philadelphia, Pennsylvania, US
- Died: October 14, 1996 (aged 60); Philadelphia, Pennsylvania, US
- Batted: Right Threw: Right

Negro leagues debut
- 1954, for the Indianapolis Clowns

Last Negro leagues appearance
- 1955, for the Indianapolis Clowns

Teams
- Indianapolis Clowns (1954–1955)

Constance Enola Morgan (October 17, 1935 – October 14, 1996) was the third woman to play professional baseball in the Negro league.

== Career ==
A native of Philadelphia, Pennsylvania, Morgan graduated from John Bartram High School in 1953 and attended William Penn Business Institute. She joined the Indianapolis Clowns of the Negro American League in 1954, playing second base under Baseball Hall of Fame skipper Oscar Charleston. She was signed "to a contract estimated at $10,000 per season" by Clowns owner Syd Pollock at the same time as female pitcher Mamie "Peanut" Johnson. She replaced Toni Stone, who had been the first woman to compete in the league, and who had been traded to the Kansas City Monarchs prior to the season. Described as standing 5 feet 4 inches (1.63 metres) tall and weighing 140 pounds (64 kilos), she was "slated to get the regular female assignment in the starting lineup." On opening day, 23 May 1954, "she went far to her right to make a sensational stop, flipped to shortstop Bill Holder and started a lightning doubleplay against the Birmingham Barons." Making her first appearance in her native Philadelphia in July, the Clowns took both games of a doubleheader from the Monarchs, one of the preeminent teams in the league. Morgan played with the Clowns through 1955. Before her tenure with Indianapolis, she played catcher for five seasons with the North Philadelphia Honey Drippers, an all-women baseball team, batting .338 in that time.

== Post-baseball life ==
At the end of the Clowns' championship season, she "switched from bats to books as she resumed her studies" in accounting at William Penn Business Institute, with the goal of becoming a "top-flight worker in a business office". She completed her program in 1955 and eventually worked for the American Federation of Labor and Congress of Industrial Organizations (AFL-CIO) until her retirement in 1974. 1995 saw her inducted into the Pennsylvania Sports Hall of Fame, and she died in Philadelphia on 14 October 1996, 3 days short of her 61st birthday.

== See also ==
- Women in baseball
