= Merl LaVoy =

American war photographer and documentary cinematographer

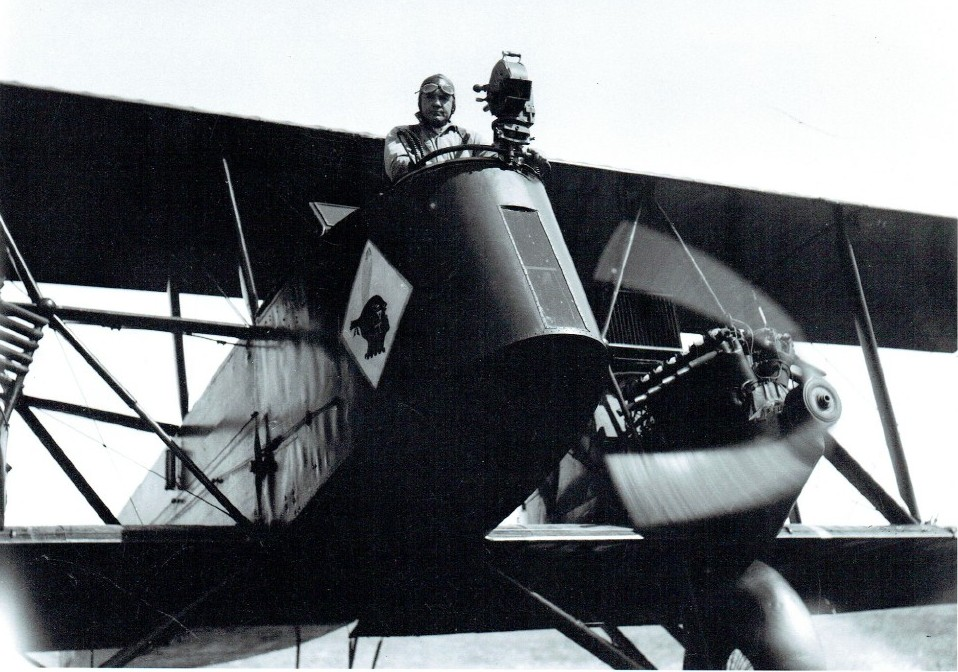
- Merl LaVoy circa 1916
- Born: December 14, 1885; Royalton, Wisconsin, US
- Died: December 7, 1953 (aged 67); Johannesburg, South Africa
- Occupation: Photographer/cinematographer

Signature
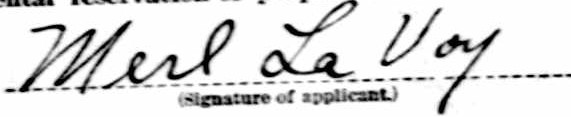

Merl LaVoy (1885–1953) was a photographer and documentary cinematographer who traveled the four corners of the world, earning him the title of “The Modern Marco Polo”.

== Biography ==
Merl LaVoy was born to Charles Henry LaVoy and Luella Easton on December 14, 1885, in the small town of Royalton, Wisconsin. LaVoy's father died tragically in a sawmill accident when Merl was 13 months old. His mother married Arthur E. Peck in 1893 and the family moved to Tower in St Louis County, Minnesota. The marriage dissolved and by 1906, LaVoy's mother married William Henry Cole in Seattle. LaVoy rarely discussed his youth but in some accounts he claimed that his parent died while he was young and he lived with an uncle in a log cabin in a heavily forested area of Oregon.

In 1907, LaVoy started working for the Great Northern Development Company, which was prospecting for copper at the Kotsina River mine in Alaska. During this time he became a dog sled musher and first started taking photographs. In Spring of 1910, LaVoy travelled to Seattle and met Herschel C. Parker and Belmore Browne and volunteered to help them in their expedition to verify if a previous expedition led by Frederick Alfred Cook who claimed to reach the summit of Denali. The team was unsuccessful. LaVoy also joined the 1912 Parker Browne expedition, in part as a photographer, and transported a ton of gear on dog sleds from Seward to Muldrow Glacier. The team came within a few hundred yards of the summit but had to turn back due to harsh weather.

In 1913, LaVoy was assigned by the Chicago Mail to accompany publisher Ben Boyce and take photos on a round-the-world journey. He carried a 40 pound panoramic camera with him and was able to photograph the Taj Mahal with a unique perspective. He later presented a copy of the photo to President Woodrow Wilson.

During World War I, LaVoy filmed with the French army during the 1916 Somme offensive where he filmed one of the first tank attacks of the First World War. LaVoy is credited as the only civilian cinematographer from the United States who filmed on the battlefields of the Somme and Verdun with the French army.

His film Heroic France was released by the Mutual Film Corporation in June 1917. LaVoy’s second war film Victorious Serbia (1918) was released in the United States at local benefit exhibitions by the Red Cross.

Merl LaVoy with Bell & Howell movie camera at the front, circa 1917

In June 1918, LaVoy accompanied lecturer Burton Holmes for his last World War I film project. During the final months of the war, they traveled together extensively across Eastern Europe. Films and photographs were made showing Romanian military operations in Transylvania, daily life in Macedonia and the city of Constantinople (Istanbul) shortly after the Turkish surrender.

After the war, LaVoy remained active as a cinematographer for the Red Cross. He filmed in Italy, the Balkans, Turkey and North Africa. During the 1920s, he had photo assignments in Australia, the Solomon Islands, the Philippines, Alaska, and China. From 1927, he made newsreels for Pathé.

During the 1930s LaVoy worked on photographic projects in Japan, China, Siberia, and Manuchukuo. In the mid-1930s, LaVoy worked for John W. Hauserman and documented Hauserman's gold mining projects in the Philippines. By 1938, LaVoy was working in South Africa where he embarked on a number of industrial film projects and freelance photography.

LaVoy died of a heart attack while staying in Johannesburg, South Africa, on December 7, 1953.

== Film work ==
Long considered a lost film, Heroic France was discovered in 2015 by film historians Ron van Dopperen and Cooper C. Graham. The footage comes from reels 3-6. It has a total playtime of a little over 35 minutes. These scenes were found in a collection of unused footage that had been collected by CBS for their TV documentary series on World War I (1964-1965) and had been donated to the National Archives.

"Heroic France" (1917) filmed by Merl LaVoy

In 2017, van Dopperen and Graham located the World War I film shot by LaVoy with the British army in Salonika (Thessaloniki, Greece).

LaVoy’s life and work during World War I has been described in more detail by authors James W. Castellan, Ron van Dopperen and Cooper C. Graham in their book American Cinematographers in the Great War, 1914-1918

== Gallery ==
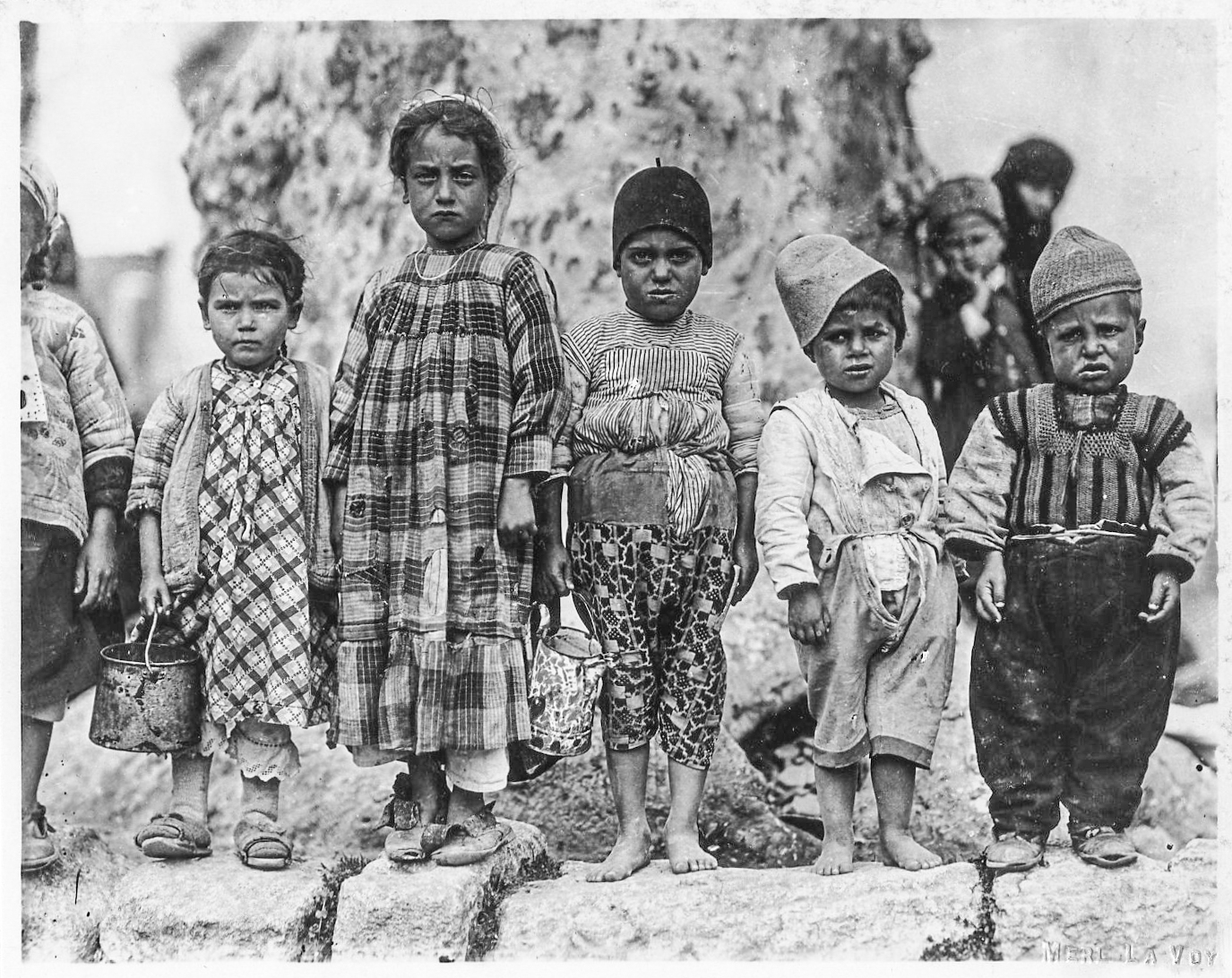
Children in Constantinople, ca 1918

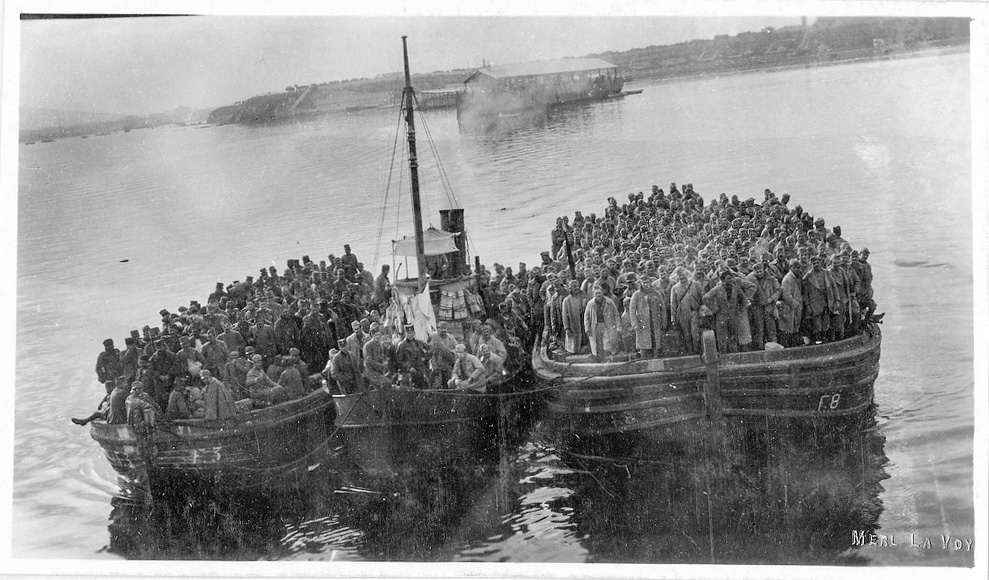
Serbian soldiers in boats during Balkans Campaign of World War I, 1918

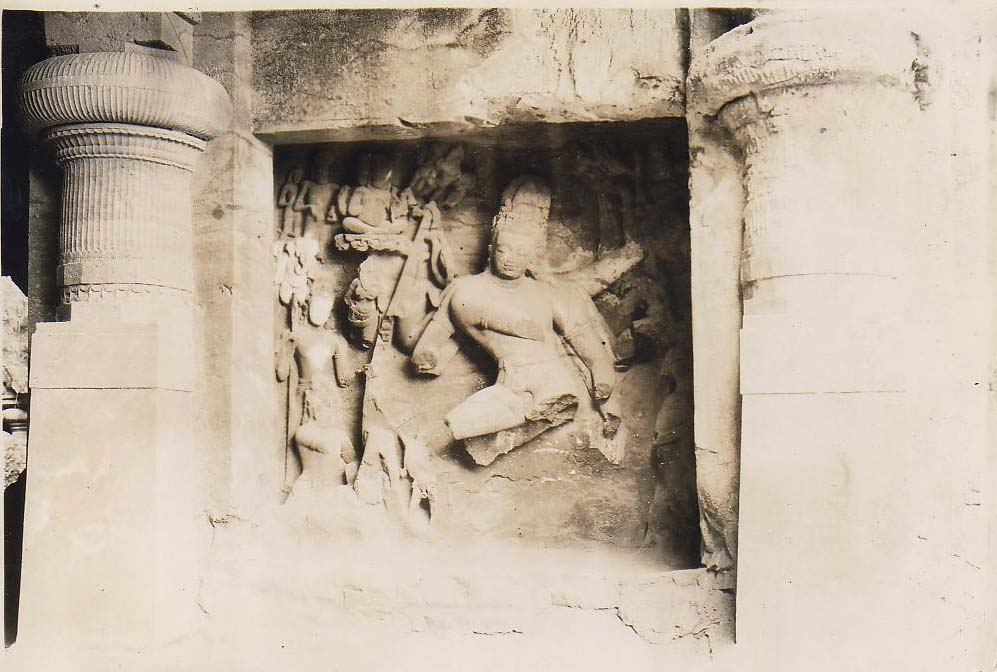
A photo by Merl LaVoy, early 1900s of Trimurti

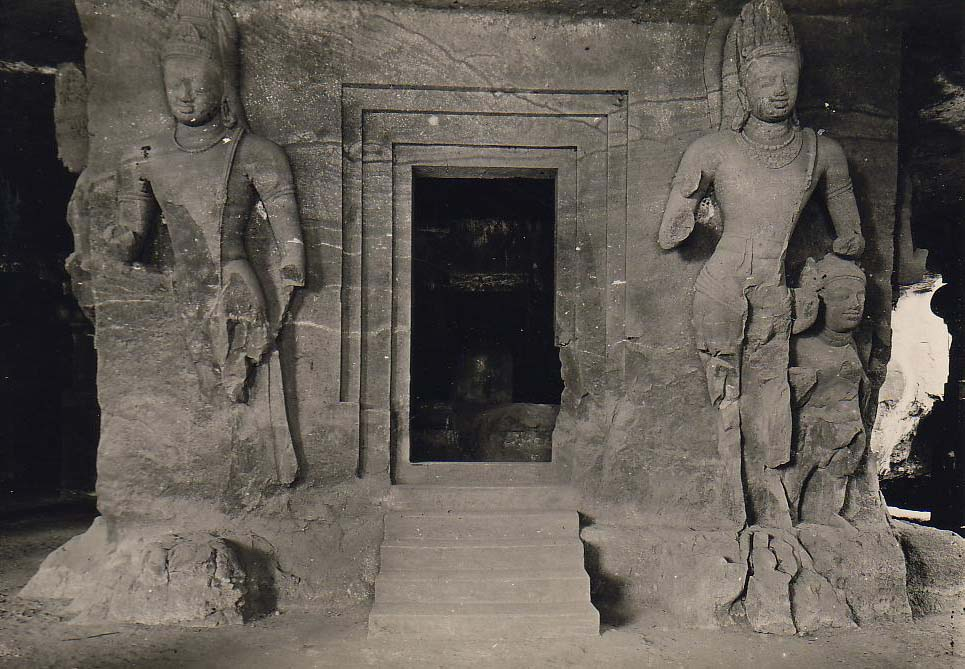
A photo by Merl LaVoy, early 1900s

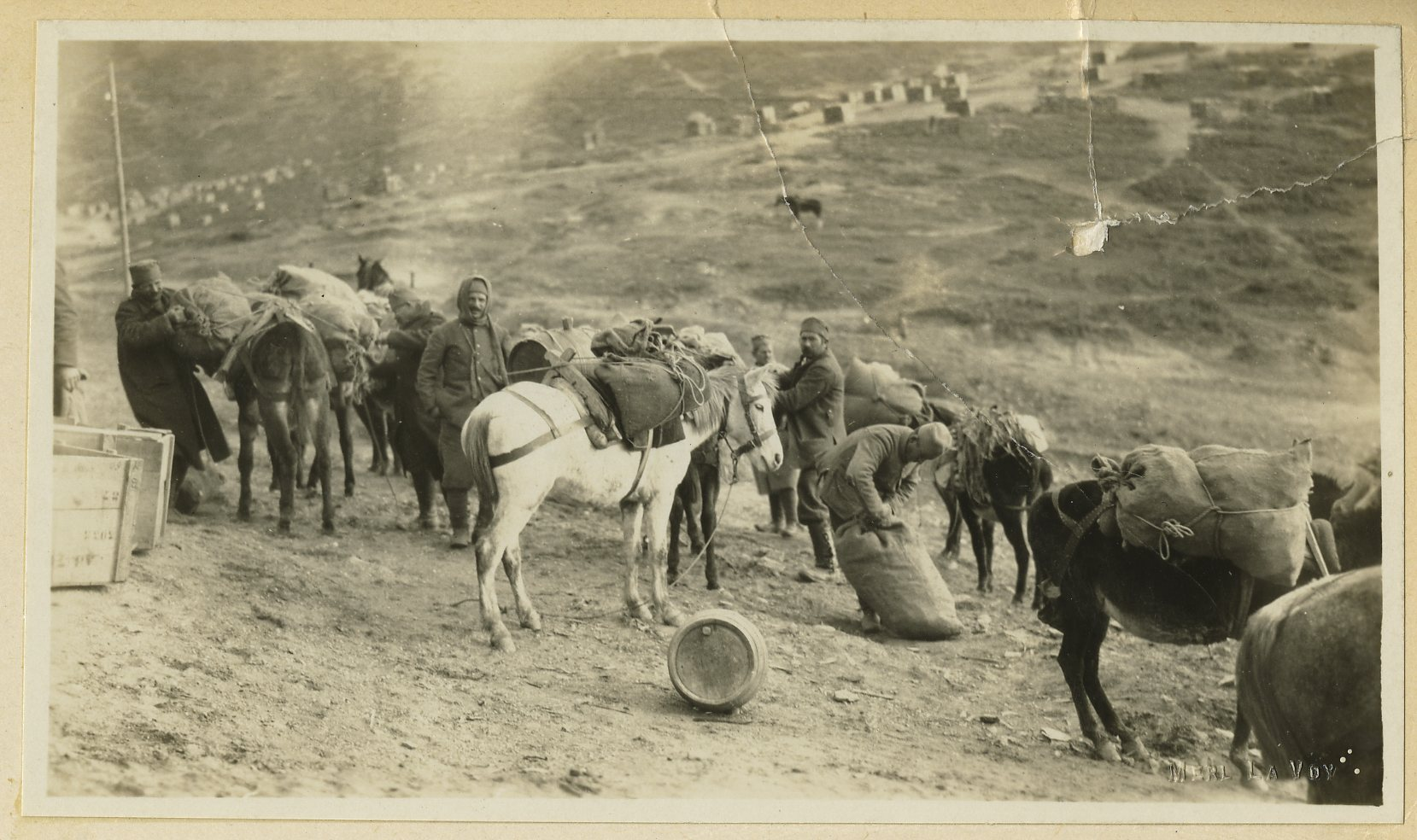
At Serbian front, National Museum of Health and Medicine

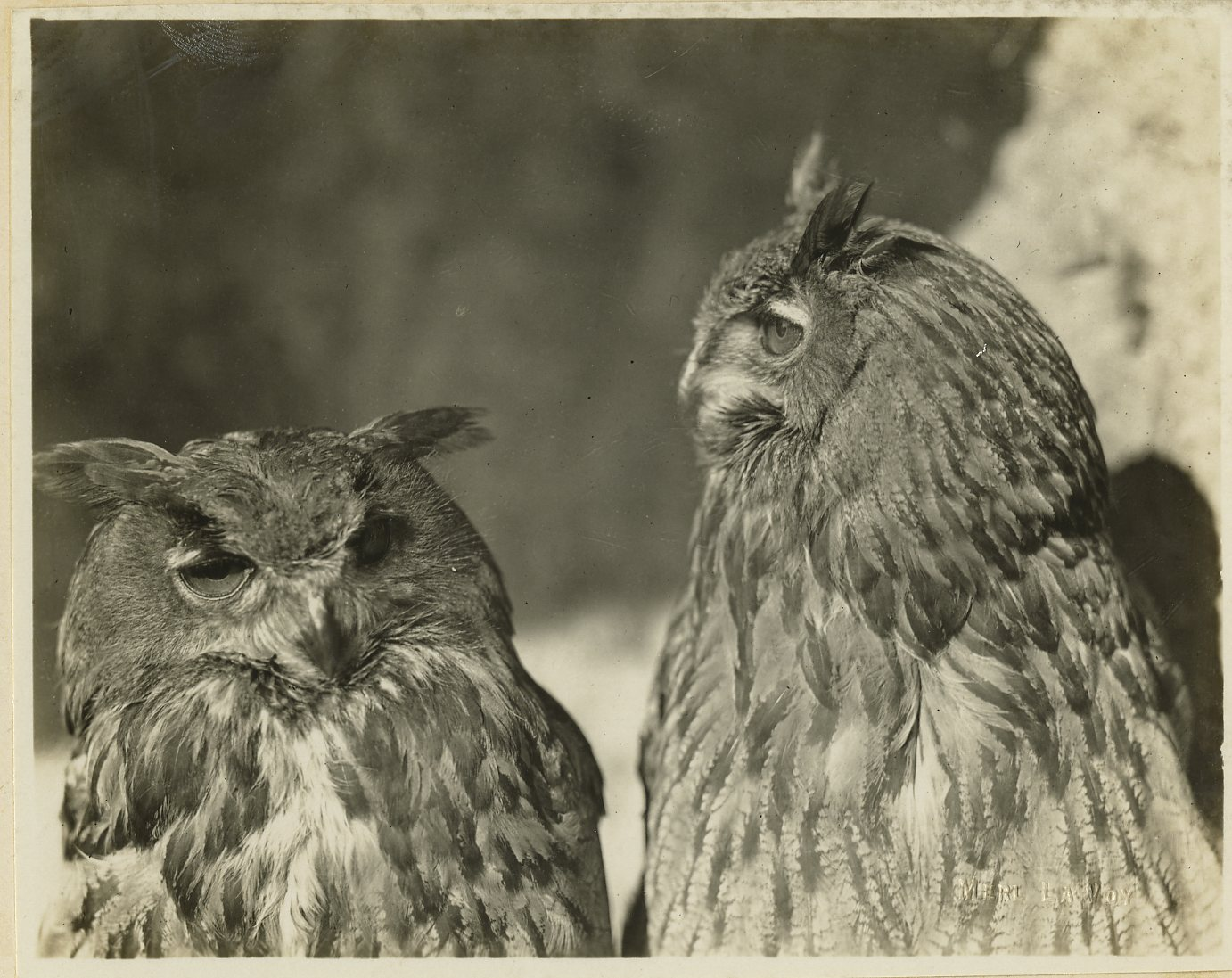
Balkan owls, National Museum of Health and Medicine

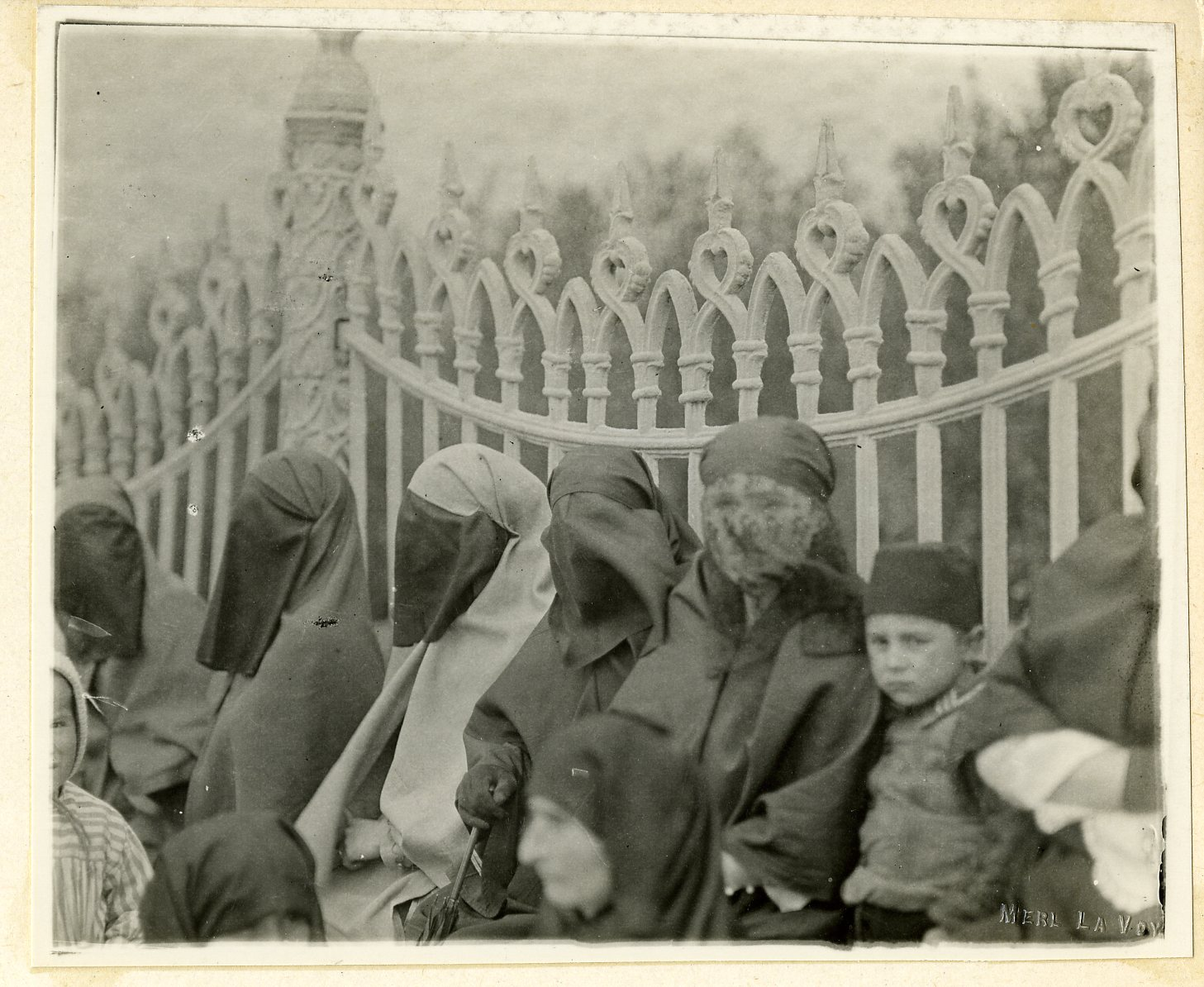
Constantinople women, National Museum of Health and Medicine

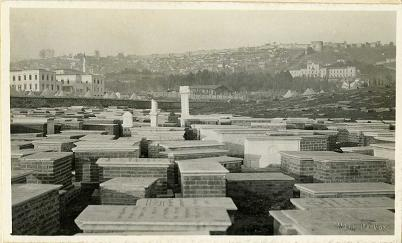
Jewish cemetery, Salonica, National Museum of Health and Medicine

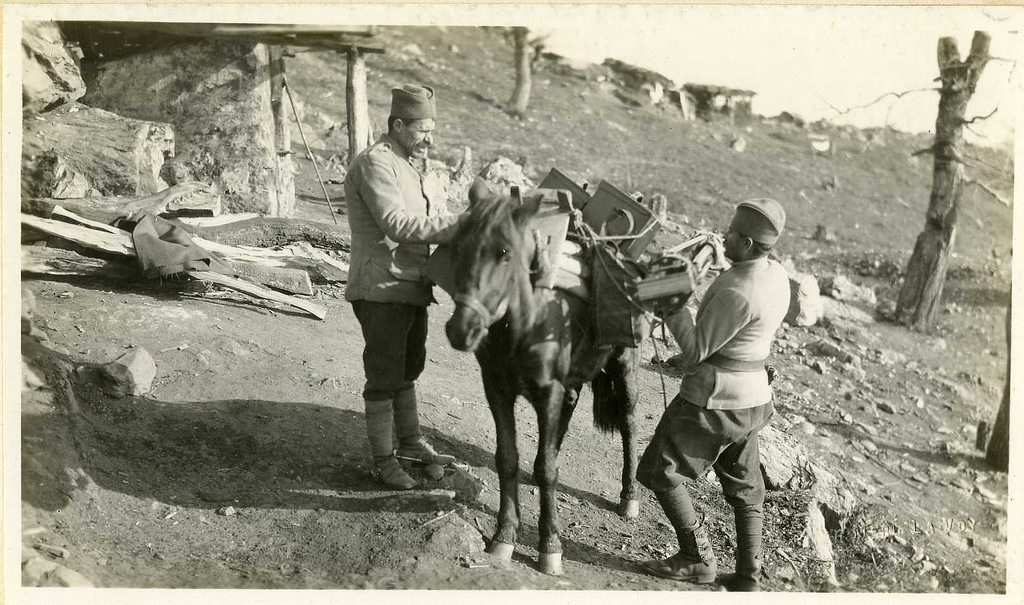
LaVoy's camera outfit, National Museum of Health and Medicine

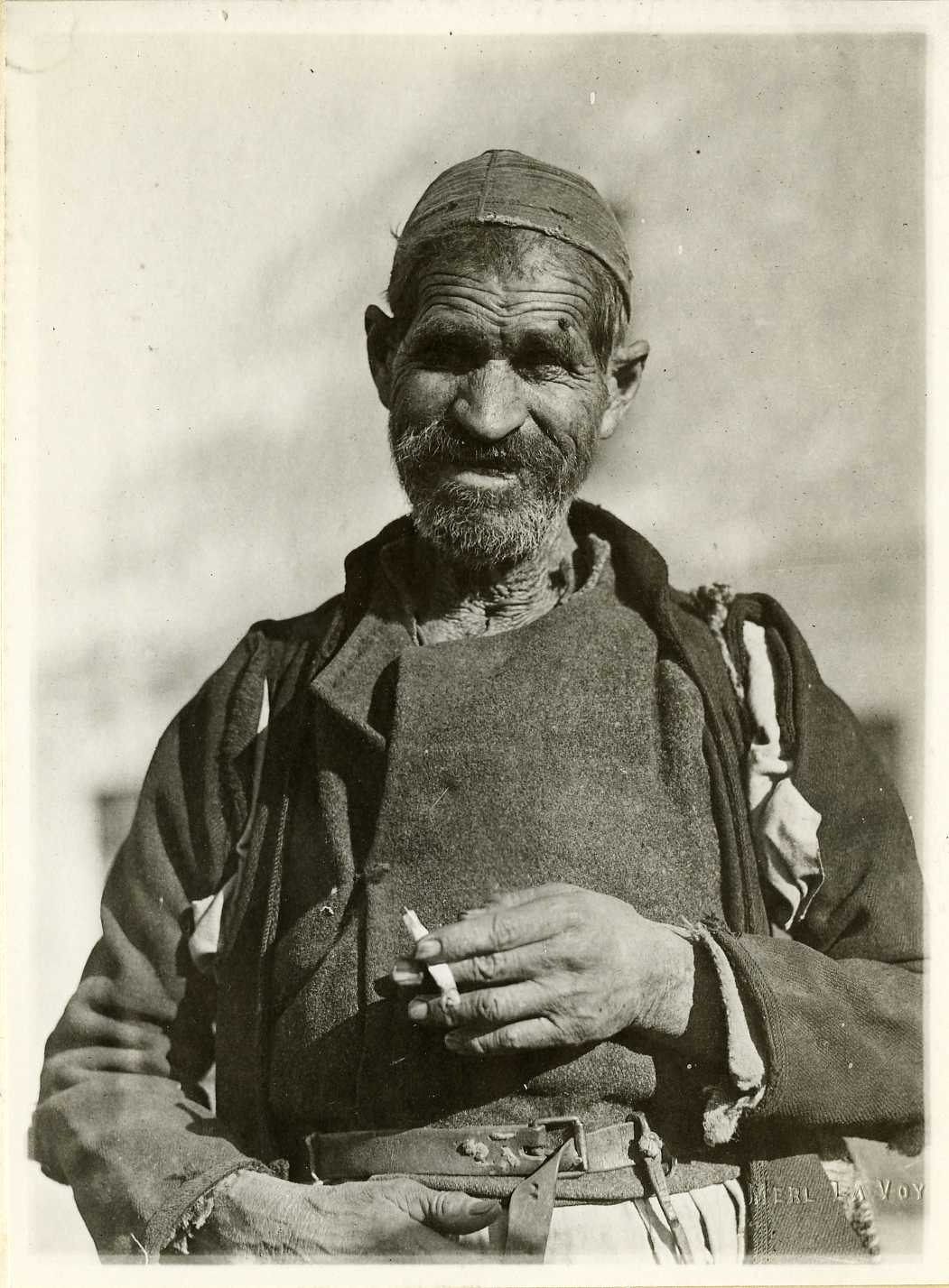
Macedonian man, National Museum of Health and Medicine

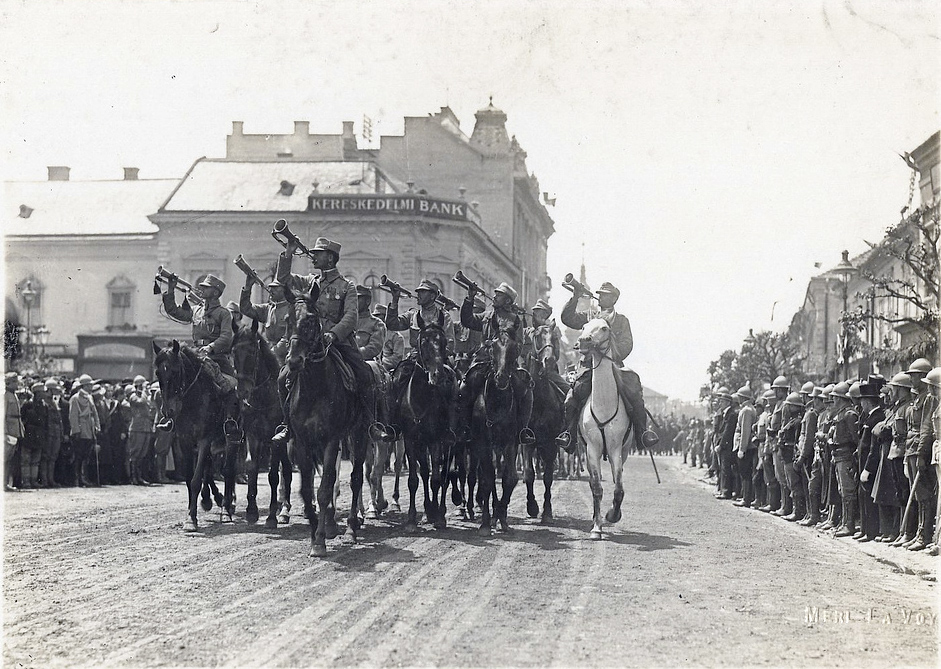
Romanian troops in Transylvania

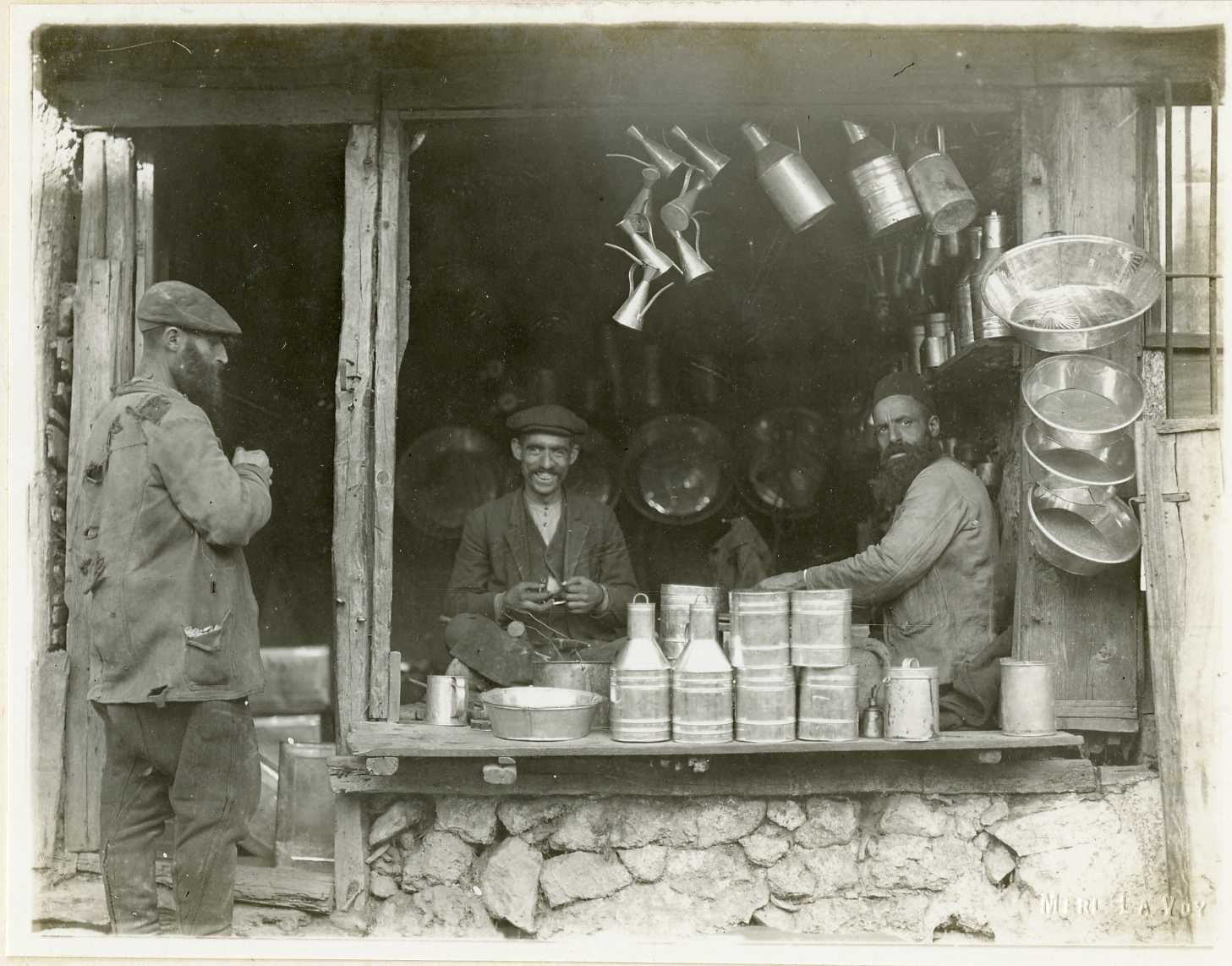
Tin shop, National Museum of Health and Medicine

== Sources ==
- Terry Ramsaye, A Million and One Nights - A History of the Motion Picture (New York 1926)
- Kevin Brownlow, The War, the West and the Wilderness (London/New York 1979)
- James W. Castellan, Ron van Dopperen, Cooper C. Graham, American Cinematographers in the Great War, 1914-1918 (New Barnet, 2014) https://doi.org/10.2307%2Fj.ctt1bmzn8c
- Book review "American Cinematographers in the Great War, 1914-1914" Historical Journal of Film, Radio & Television (2016)
- Weblog on the American Films and Cinematographers of World War I, 2013-2018
- "The Why of the Tankless Film", Motion Picture Magazine (August 1917), 60-61
- Gerry Veeder, "The Red Cross Bureau of Pictures", Historical Journal of Film, Radio and Television 1 (1990), 38-43
- Heroic France (USA, 1917) shot by Merl LaVoy (reconstruction, 2015)
- Movie Trailer "American Cinematographers in the Great War, 1914-1918"
- Stereoscopic photograph showing Merl laVoy in military airplane (Serbia, 1918)
