= Diocese of the Southeast (Reformed Episcopal Church) =

Reformed Episcopal diocese in the United States

Location
- Ecclesiastical province: Anglican Church in North America

Statistics
- Parishes: 33 (2025)
- Members: 2,330 (2025)

Information
- Rite: Anglican

Current leadership
- Bishop: Willie J. Hill Jr.

Website
- rec-dse.org

The Diocese of the Southeast is a Reformed Episcopal Church diocese and as such an Anglican Church in North America founding diocese. The diocese comprises 32 parishes, 30 in South Carolina and 2 in Georgia, in the United States. Its headquarters are located in Summerville, South Carolina. The current bishop ordinary is Willie J. Hill Jr., who was installed in September 2022.

== History ==
The Diocese of the Southeast, previously the Missionary Jurisdiction of the South, origin goes back to 1865, on the aftermath of the Civil War, with the work of Peter Fayssoux Stevens, a former Confederate colonel, a member of the Protestant Episcopal Church. He reunited former parishioners and many black freedmen and started working for the establishment of a new church for the coloured people, that would be Immanuel Church, in Berkeley County, South Carolina. Four years later, he already had organized three large congregations of freedmen.

In December 1874, in a convention held in Pinopolis, with members of four parishes, after the rejection of four black men from the ministry by the Protestant Episcopal Church, it was decided to leave the Diocese of South Carolina and to seek membership with the newly created Reformed Episcopal Church. In the same convention, Frank Crawford Ferguson was elected President and wrote to the Presiding Bishop of the Reformed Episcopal Church, George Cummins. In June 1875, he received a letter by Benjamin Johnson, explaining that he had been sent by the General Council of the REC to receive all the black people willing to join the denomination. The new body would be the Missionary Jurisdiction of the South, named Diocese of the Southeast when the division into dioceses was adopted in 1984.

The diocese was a founding jurisdiction of the Anglican Church in North America, as part of the Reformed Episcopal Church, in 2009.

== List of bishops ordinary ==
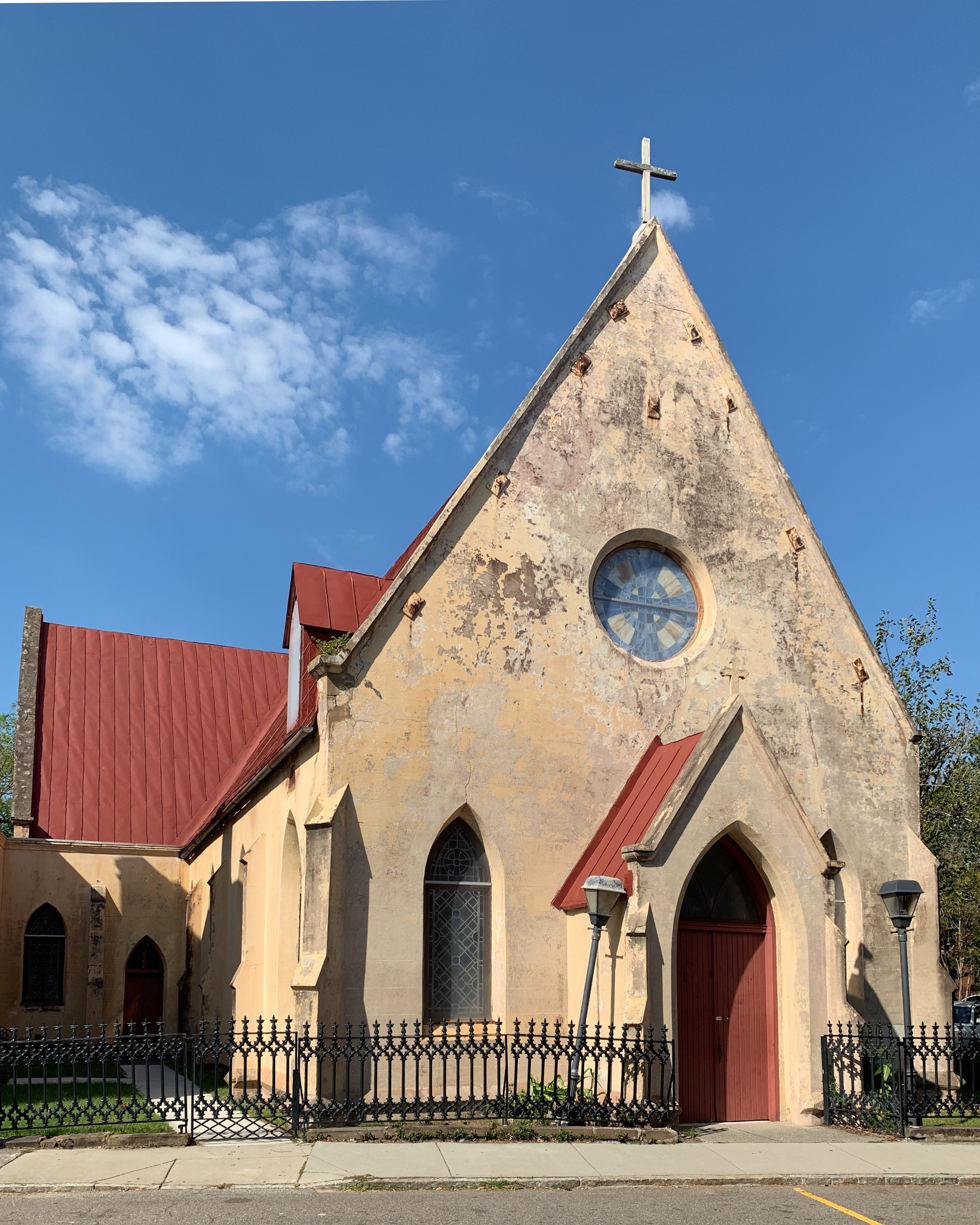
St. John's Reformed Episcopal Church in Charleston.

Bishops prior to 1984 were bishops of the Missionary Jurisdiction of the South; bishops from 1984 to the present were bishops of the Diocese of the Southeast.

Name	Years
Peter Fayssoux Stevens	1879–1909
Arthur Pengelley	1909–1922
Joseph E. Kearney	1922–1958
William Jerdan Jr.	1960–1987
Sanco K. Rembert	1987–1998
James C. West	1998–2006
Alphonza Gadsden Sr	2007–2020
William J. White	2020–2022
Willie J. Hill Jr.	2022–present

== Parishes ==
In 2025, the diocese reported 33 congregations, up one from the previous year, with 2,330 members (up 9% from 2022) and an average Sunday attendance of 1,391 (up 16% from 2022). Notable parishes in the diocese include St. John's REC in Charleston.

== Cummins Memorial Theological Seminary ==
Cummins Memorial Theological Seminary
- Former name: Bishop Cummins Training School
- Type: Seminary
- Established: 1876
- Founder: Peter Fayssoux Stevens
- Religious affiliation: Reformed Episcopal Church
- Chairperson: Rose Delores Gibbs
- President: Willie Hill
- Dean: Glenvil Gregory
- Students: 12
- Location: Summerville, South Carolina; 33.0121°N 80.1802°W
- Website: cumminstheoseminary.org

The diocesan seminary trains students within and outside of the Anglican tradition; both men and women are eligible to enroll. It is the oldest American seminary that has historically trained African Americans for ministry in the Episcopal tradition. Mirroring the demographics of the diocese, it has a mostly black student body. As of 2020, it was unaccredited and mostly operated as a night school for those who work full-time, offering a master of divinity, master of arts in Christian leadership, and bachelor of theology degrees.

=== History ===
The seminary was founded by Bishop Peter Fayssoux Stevens in 1876 as the Bishop Cummins Training School in Charleston in honor of the late Bishop Cummins. It moved to Summerville in 1924. The school received a state charter as a seminary in 1939.

It operated from a former hospital in Summerville until 1966, when declining enrollment resulted in the seminary's closure. It was revived in 1979 by bishops William Jerdan Jr. and Sanco Rembert, and the present campus and diocesan headquarters on South Main Street was purchased in 1980.

In January 2020, the seminary announced the raising of $100,000 toward its endowment fund with a goal of achieving accreditation through the Transnational Association of Christian Colleges and Schools. Glenvil Gregory, a former U.S. Army chaplain and REC minister in South Carolina, was appointed dean in 2024.

=== Campus ===
The 3-acre (1.2 ha) seminary campus includes a main building that houses classrooms, a library, the diocesan offices and archives, and a dormitory. The main building was built as a Victorian residence in 1901 for businessman Milton P. Skinner. It was used as a private residence until 1952, when it became the site of the Pinewood School. The seminary campus also includes a small wooden chapel known as Pengelley Memorial Chapel, after former Bishop Arthur Pengelley. St. Paul's Reformed Episcopal Church meets in the chapel, which was previously the St. Barbabas Mission, a chapel established by St. Paul's Episcopal Church in Summerville.
