= Merl Code =

American gridiron football player and lawyer (born 1948)

Profile
- Position: Defensive back

Personal information
- Born: September 8, 1948 (age 78); Seneca, South Carolina, U.S.
- Listed height: 6 ft 0 in (1.83 m)
- Listed weight: 195 lb (88 kg)

Career information
- High school: Blue Ridge (Greer, South Carolina)
- College: North Carolina A&T

Career history
- 1970–1973: Montreal Alouettes
- 1974–1975: Memphis Southmen
- 1976: Ottawa Rough Riders

Awards and highlights
- Grey Cup champion (1970); First-team Little All-American (1969)

Merl F. Code (born September 8, 1948) is a lawyer and former Grey Cup champion Canadian Football League player.

The son of Allen Louis Code and Sedalia Blassingame Code, he played college football at North Carolina A&T State University, where he earned his Bachelor of Science degree in mathematics (cum laude).

Turning professional in 1970, Code played in the CFL with the Montreal Alouettes, where he won a Grey Cup championship in his rookie season. After playing 30 regular season games for the Als over 4 seasons, he jumped to the new World Football League, playing 2 seasons with the Memphis Southmen. He finished his football career back in the CFL with the Ottawa Rough Riders, playing 5 games and intercepting 2 passes for 21 yards.

After his football days were over, Code returned to school at the University of South Carolina's School of Law, earning his Juris Doctor degree in 1979. He was an Earl Warren Legal Scholar, and became the first African American to serve as president of the Student Bar Association at USC.

Now a municipal judge, his accomplishments are many: the first African American to serve as a Municipal Court Judge in Greenville, South Carolina in 1981; the first African American to serve as Chairman of the Greenville Chamber of Commerce in 1999, the Order of the Palmetto, in 1996, South Carolina's highest civilian award; the Compleat Lawyer Award by the South Carolina Bar Association in 1997; North Carolina A&T University Hall of Fame in 1981; and he was inducted into the South Carolina Black Hall of Fame in 1999. In 2001, the South Carolina Department of Education honored Code in its African-American History Month calendar alongside Sanco Rembert, Tom Feelings, Mamie Johnson, Bill Pinkney, and other notable black South Carolinians.

He is also the owner and CEO of Precision Tool Manufacturer, the owner and chair of Code Insurance Associates, and president of Code & Associates, a sports management agency.

Code practices law with Ogletree Deakins.

He and his wife Denise have two children. In October, 2018, Code represented his son, Merl Code Jr., who was on trial after his arrest in the 2017-2018 NCAA basketball recruiting scandal.
