= Mamie Johnson =

American baseball player (1935–2017)

- Johnson in 2014
- Pitcher
- Born: September 27, 1935; Ridgeway, South Carolina, U.S.
- Died: December 18, 2017 (aged 82); Washington, D.C., U.S.
- Batted: Right Threw: Right

Negro leagues debut
- 1953, for the Indianapolis Clowns

Last Negro leagues appearance
- 1955, for the Indianapolis Clowns

Negro leagues statistics
- Win–loss record: 33–8

Teams
- Indianapolis Clowns (1953–1955)

Mamie "Peanut" Johnson (September 27, 1935 – December 18, 2017) was an American professional baseball player who was the second of three women, and the first female pitcher, to play in the Negro leagues.

== Early life ==
Johnson was born Mamie Belton in Ridgeway, South Carolina on September 27, 1935, to Della Belton Havelow and Gentry Harrison. Soon after, her father moved to start another family and her mother moved to Washington, D.C. for economic opportunities. Mamie was raised by her grandmother until the age of 8, when she moved in with her aunt and uncle in Long Branch, New Jersey.

At a young age Mamie would "knock birds out of the trees with rocks" and played baseball with some of the neighborhood boys. Her mother told her that her baseball skills were credit to her father who was a good ballplayer himself. In New Jersey Mamie's athletic career began as she joined the Police Athletic League (PAL). At age 11 Mamie moved to D.C. and continued to play both baseball and softball there.

Johnson attended high school at Long Branch High School, and after graduating in 1949 attended New York University for a short while.

== Baseball career ==
After graduating high school, Mamie played with the St. Cyprian recreational team in D.C. At 17, Johnson hoped to pursue a baseball career and tried out for the All-American Girls Professional Baseball League. Despite being a skilled player with lots of experience and Men's Major League Baseball being integrated by this time, Mamie was not allowed to try out due to the color of her skin.

However, soon after this rejection Mamie was offered the opportunity to try out for the Indianapolis Clowns. Along with Connie Morgan, she was signed by the Indianapolis Clowns in 1953, played with the team from 1953 to 1955, and had a 33–8 win–loss record. A right-handed pitcher with a deceptively hard fastball, she also threw a slider, circle changeup, curveball, screwball, and knuckleball. She received pointers on pitching the curveball from Satchel Paige. At the plate, batting right-handed, her batting average was in the range of .262 to .284.

Johnson was known as "Peanut" during her career due to her height—5 feet, 3 inches. She also weighed only 98 pounds when she was a player. Johnson earned the nickname after an at-bat in which she faced Hank Baylis of the Kansas City Monarchs. After a hard strike, Baylis stepped out of the batter's box and said, "Why, that little girl's no bigger than a peanut. I ain't afraid of her." She proceeded to strike him out.

In order to help sell tickets, Mamie and Morgan were played at least once a game as they were popular with the crowd. This publicity was needed because at the time the Negro League was on the decline with public popularity.

== Post-baseball life ==
After retiring at 19, she earned a nursing degree from North Carolina Agricultural & Technical State University and established a 30-year career at Sibley Hospital in Washington, D.C. (Before playing professional baseball, she had been accepted to attend New York University.)

She married Charles Johnson; their marriage ended in divorce. She later married Edwardo Goodman. Johnson also had a son, Charles, prior to her baseball career. Charles was raised by her mother until she ended her career in the Negro Leagues to go care for him.

After her nursing career, Mamie helped to manage the Negro Leagues Gift Shop, a memorabilia store in Maryland. She continued to be involved in various baseball pursuits, including appearances at tournaments and coaching little league.

Mamie Johnson died on December 18, 2017, in a Washington, D.C. hospital of cardiac-related causes. She was survived by her third husband, Emanuel Livingston; five stepdaughters; a stepson; her uncle, Leo "Bones" Belton; several siblings; two grandsons; and many step-grandchildren.

== Honors and awards ==
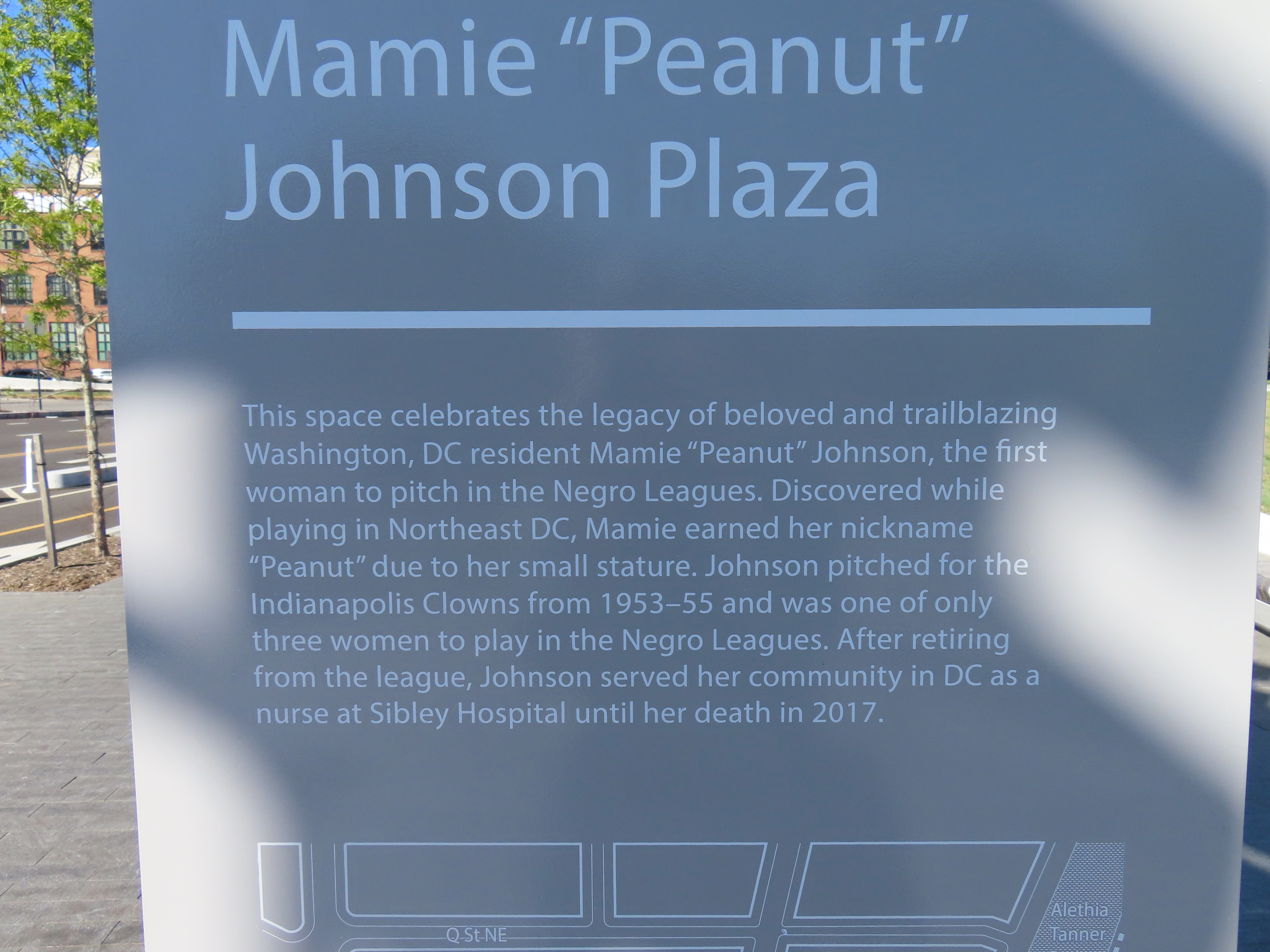
Mamie "Peanut" Johnson Plaza marker

Johnson is the subject of the children's book A Strong Right Arm, describing her life growing up and the obstacles to her becoming a professional Negro league baseball player. She is also the subject of the children's book Mamie on the Mound. According to Collider, she is referenced in the 1992 movie A League of Their Own when in an iconic scene DeLisa Chinn-Tyler throws a ball to Geena Davis.

In 1999, Johnson was a guest of the Clintons at the White House. She has also been recognized in the Negro Leagues Baseball Museum in Kansas City. In 2001, the South Carolina Department of Education honored Johnson in its African-American History Month calendar alongside Merl Code, Tom Feelings, Sanco Rembert, Bill Pinkney, and other notable black South Carolinians.

On June 5, 2008, Johnson and other players from the Negro league era were drafted by major league franchises prior to the 2008 MLB draft; Johnson was selected by the Washington Nationals. On October 3, 2009, Johnson spoke at Baseball Americana 2009, organized by the Library of Congress, in the company of Larry Dierker, Ernie Banks, and other figures from baseball's history. In 2015, a Little League named for Johnson was formed in Washington. Johnson is also featured in the Baseball Hall of Fame in Cooperstown, New York. Johnson's hometown of Ridgeway also named a street in her honor.

A congested intersection of Washington, D.C. streets, known informally as "Dave Thomas Circle" for the Wendy's restaurant formerly located there, was reconstructed. The roughly triangular space in the center was opened as Mamie "Peanut" Johnson Plaza in June 2025.

== See also ==
- Women in baseball

== Bibliography ==
- Green, Michelle Y. (2002). A Strong Right Arm: The Story of Mamie "Peanut" Johnson. New York: Dial Books for Young Readers. ISBN 978-0-8037-2661-1. OCLC 46671140.
