= Mark Zimmerman =

American Anglican bishop (born 1956)

The Right Reverend J. Mark Zimmerman
- Bishop Suffragan in the Diocese of Western Anglicans
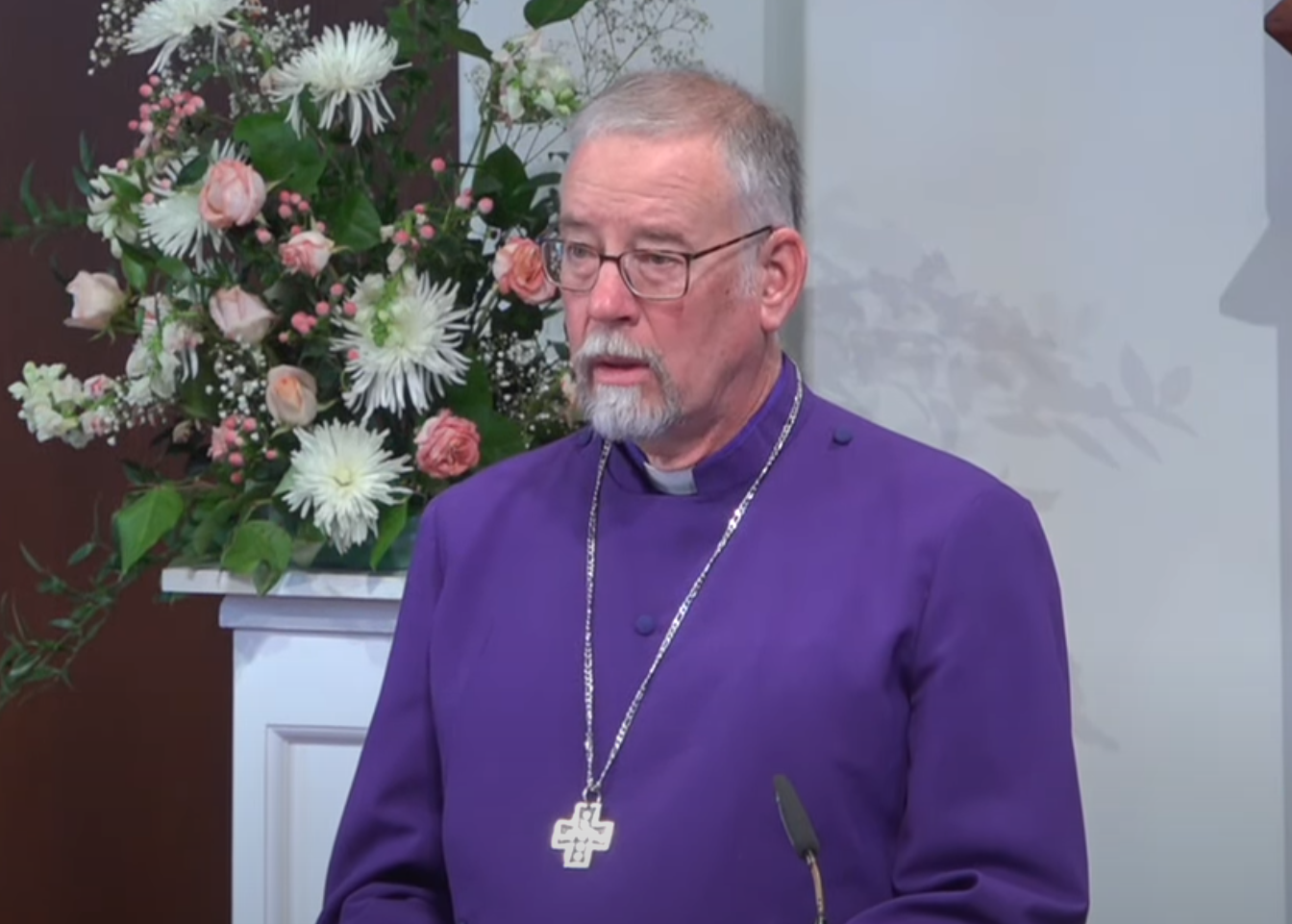
- Zimmerman speaks at an Anglicans for Life service preceding the 2020 March for Life.
- Church: Anglican Church in North America
- Diocese: Western Anglicans
- In office: 2023–present
- Previous post: Bishop of the Southwest (2014–2020)

Orders
- Consecration: February 28, 2014 by Robert Duncan

Personal details
- Born: 1956 (age 69–70)

John Mark Zimmerman (born 1956) is an American Anglican bishop. He was the first diocesan bishop of the Anglican Diocese of the Southwest, which has jurisdiction in west Texas, New Mexico and Mexico in the Anglican Church in North America.

== Early life, education, and early ministry ==
Zimmerman was born in 1956 to an Episcopal priest. After completing college, he met his future wife, Cynthia, and they worked overseas, teaching English in Oman. Zimmerman received a call to ministry and attended Trinity School for Ministry, graduating with an M.Div. in 1986. Early in his ordained career, he spent nine years as a priest in New Mexico.

From 1999 to 2008, Zimmerman was rector of St. Francis-in-the-Fields Episcopal Church in Somerset, Pennsylvania, growing it from a 30-member congregation to nearly 100 in Sunday attendance and debt-free status for the first time in its history. In 2008―the same year that the majority of the Episcopal Diocese of Pittsburgh voted to leave the episcopal church, thus forming the Anglican Diocese of Pittsburgh―Zimmerman announced to the congregation that he was leaving the Episcopal Church. Eighty percent of St. Francis' members followed him, and the new congregation, called Somerset Anglican Fellowship, left its building and began meeting at a local mall. In 2011, Somerset Anglican Fellowship purchased the former St. Paul Presbyterian Church in Somerset and relocated there. Zimmerman launched a Young Life chapter in Somerset and started a Spanish-speaking outreach service.

== Episcopacy ==
The newly formed Diocese of the Southwest elected Zimmerman as its first diocesan bishop in 2014. He was consecrated at the Church of St. Clement in El Paso by Archbishop Robert Duncan on February 28, 2014. The diocese was small, with just 14 congregations spread across a large and remote geographic area.

During his episcopacy, the diocese grew to 22 congregations. In 2016, Zimmerman joined fellow ACNA Bishops Eric Menees, Keith Andrews, Kevin Bond Allen, and Todd Hunter to streamline the ordination process in western U.S. ACNA dioceses, with a joint exam and a joint examining board that would allow clergy ordained under the standards to serve in any participating diocese. In November 2019, Zimmerman ordained Farhid Adabache to the priesthood in Fresnillo, Mexico. Adabache was the first Mexican national to be ordained by the ACNA to serve a Mexican congregation.

In 2020, Zimmerman began winding down his episcopal duties after accepting a call to serve for a two-year period as a half-time bishop-in-residence and interim rector at Christ Church Phoenix in the Diocese of Western Anglicans. Since March 2023, he has been suffragan bishop in the Diocese of Western Anglicans with charge over the Yellowstone Missionary District, a grouping of 10 churches across Idaho, Montana, Utah, and Wyoming seeking to grow into a future diocese.

Anglican Communion titles
| Preceded by Winfield Mott (vicar general) | I Bishop of the Southwest; 2014–2020 | Succeeded by Steven Tighe |
