= Bill Thompson (bishop) =

American Anglican bishop (1946–2020)

The Right Reverend William A. Thompson
- Bishop of Western Anglicans
- Church: Anglican Church in North America
- Diocese: Western Anglicans
- In office: 2009–2014
- Successor: Keith Andrews
- Previous posts: Rector, All Saints Anglican Church

Orders
- Ordination: December 1971
- Consecration: October 31, 2009 by Robert Duncan

Personal details
- Born: August 2, 1946
- Died: June 21, 2020 (aged 73)

William Avery Thompson (1946–2020) was an American Anglican bishop. A key figure in the Anglican realignment in the United States, he was the longtime rector of All Saints Episcopal Church, which left the Episcopal Church for oversight by the Church of Uganda in 2004. He became a leader in the Common Cause Partnership, which in 2009 emerged as the Anglican Church in North America, and in 2009 was elected the first bishop of the ACNA's Diocese of Western Anglicans.

== Education and early career ==
Thompson was born in 1946. He was raised in the Episcopal Church at All Saints, Long Beach. In 1966, while a student at Stanford University, Thompson was recommended by All Saints' vestry as a postulant for ordained ministry. After graduating, he received his M.Div. from Seabury-Western Theological Seminary in 1971 and was ordained to the priesthood. Thompson returned to All Saints in 1973 to serve as curate; in 1975, at the age of 28, he was elected the church's sixth rector.

Thompson served as rector until 2012, seeing the church grow to 400 in membership. During his years as rector, the church added a columbarium and a new preschool space. Under Thompson's leadership, All Saints became one of the most generous parishes in contributing to the Episcopal Diocese of Los Angeles' Mission Share Fund. Thompson also held leadership roles in the diocese, serving on Diocesan Council, the Commission on Ministry, the Ecclesiastical Court, and the Clergy Sexual Misconduct Task Force. In 1984, California Gov. George Deukmejian—a longtime parishioner at All Saints—appointed Thompson to serve on the California Board of Behavioral Science Examiners, which oversees social worker licensing. Deukmejian reappointed Thompson to a second term in 1987.

== Anglican realignment ==
All Saints was a prominent evangelical and theologically conservative congregation in the Diocese of Los Angeles. The divide between the Episcopal Church and All Saints grew in 2003 with the election of Gene Robinson, a partnered gay man, as bishop of New Hampshire. In June 2004, Thompson led a conference of Anglican Communion Network members in southern California seeking alternative primatial oversight. "Much of ECUSA has lost its way. We must get that way back for ourselves," he told the meeting.

In August 2004, All Saints voted to disaffiliate from the Episcopal Church and seek episcopal oversight in the Church of Uganda's Diocese of Luwero. Thompson said that the Anglican churches of Africa “have intense passion and a strong commitment to uphold the true message of the Bible.” Joining All Saints was St. James Episcopal Church in Newport Beach and eventually two other congregations in the Diocese of Los Angeles. Los Angeles Bishop Jon Bruno responded by inhibiting Thompson and the other clergy and objecting to Henry Orombi, the primate of the Church of Uganda, that boundary-crossing by bishops "flies in the face of our ethos as Anglicans."

In September 2004, Bruno and the Diocese of Los Angeles sued the departing congregations to regain control of the property under the Episcopal Church's Dennis Canon. In November 2005, trial court judge David Velazquez ruled that the diocese had no claim on All Saints and another church property; he had already made a similar ruling in the separate St. James case. However, in January 2009, the California Supreme Court found for the diocese, ruling that "[a]pplying the neutral principles of law approach, we conclude that the general church, not the local church, owns the property in question. Although the deeds to the property have long been in the name of the local church, that church agreed from the beginning of its existence to be part of the greater church and to be bound by its governing documents." The case set California precedent for the subsequent litigation between the Episcopal Church and the Anglican Diocese of San Joaquin, which had also sought to secede and retain church properties.

After the conclusion of the litigation, Thompson and Bruno reached an agreement for All Saints to buy the church property from the diocese.

As dean of the western convocation of the Anglican Communion Network, Thompson was involved in the formation of the Anglican Church in North America. In June 2008, he was appointed collegiate vicar for the Association of Western Anglican Congregations in the Common Cause Partnership. As the leader of the western Anglican proto-diocese, he was elected the first bishop of the newly approved diocese at ACNA's inaugural assembly in Bedford, Texas, in 2009. Archbishop Robert Duncan consecrated him in Newport Beach on October 31, 2009.

== Later life ==
Thompson served as bishop for less than five years. At the provincial level, he chaired the ACNA's Prayer Book and Common Liturgy Task Force, overseeing the development of the texts that would be released for trial use and eventually become the ACNA's 2019 Book of Common Prayer. In 2012, he stepped down as rector of All Saints to focus solely on his diocesan work.

In the summer of 2013, Thompson experienced health problems, including a concussion and low blood pressure, that resulted in hospitalization. He announced to the diocese that he would retire in June 2014, providing time for the election of a successor. In the spring of 2014, Thompson announced that he had been diagnosed with early-stage Alzheimer's disease. After Thompson's retirement, Keith Andrews was elected to succeed him as diocesan bishop.

Thompson died on June 21, 2020. He was survived by his wife, Claudia, their three adult children, and their grandchildren.

Anglican Communion titles
Preceded by Position created	I Bishop of Western Anglicans; 2009–2014	Succeeded by Keith Andrews
