= Keith Andrews (bishop) =

American Anglican bishop (born 1954)

The Right Reverend M. Keith Andrews
- Bishop of Western Anglicans
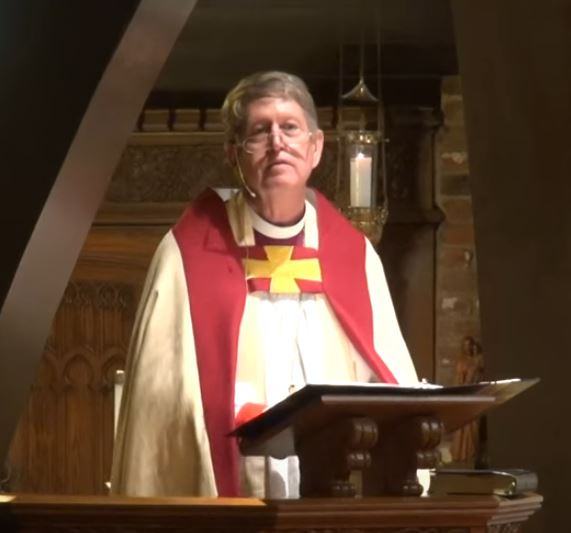
- Keith Andrews preaches at All Saints Anglican Cathedral in 2018.
- Church: Anglican Church in North America
- Diocese: Western Anglicans
- In office: 2015–2025
- Predecessor: Bill Thompson (bishop)
- Successor: Phil Ashey

Orders
- Consecration: January 25, 2015 by Foley Beach

Personal details
- Born: 1954 (age 71–72)

Milton Keith Andrews (born 1954) is an American Anglican bishop. He was the second bishop of the Diocese of Western Anglicans in the Anglican Church in North America from 2015 to 2025. Ordained in the Episcopal Church, he was the rector of a congregation that split during the Anglican realignment.

== Education and early career ==
Andrews received a B.A. and M.A. from Arizona State University, his M.Div. from the Church Divinity School of the Pacific and his D.Min. from Fuller Theological Seminary. His first clergy role was as assistant rector at All Saints Episcopal Church in Carmel, California, from 1981 to 1983, followed by serving as associate rector at Christ Church of the Ascension in Paradise Valley, Arizona. In 1985, Andrews was the planting vicar of St. James Episcopal Church. The church first met in living rooms, and then moved to rented locations at a school and a synagogue. In 1991, St. James built a permanent building in Tempe and established a preschool. Andrews became rector after the congregation received parish status in the Episcopal Diocese of Arizona.

== Anglican realignment ==
Andrews has said that he had grown increasingly uncomfortable with what he called "deconstructionist" theology in the Episcopal Church. "I was trained in deconstructionism," he said of his seminary education. "The truth is, I'm a moderate. The problem is that things have moved so consistently to the left in the church over the past 30 to 40 years that now I am seen as ‘fringe.’ I was still in this church all this time because I was committed to the life of the church and to its health and well-being."

His objections to the Episcopal Church came to a head with the election of Gene Robinson as bishop of New Hampshire in 2003. Andrews acknowledged that “[t]he emotional experience of many will be jubilation and the emotional experience of many is going to be devastation. This is going to have far-reaching implications of what the church looks like. It is going to affect families, pastors, churches and it is going to have a profound impact. . . It is going to change the landscape of the church.”

In March 2005, between 60 and 80 percent of St. James' congregation voted to leave the Episcopal Church. Andrews joined them, noting that he did not "renounce my [Episcopal] orders is because I have done nothing wrong that should cause me to renounce them," and they planted Living Faith Anglican Church as part of the Anglican Mission in America, with Andrews as founding rector. The church plant was sustained initially by contributions made over the previous year to an independent endowment set up by St. James members, and there was no dispute over St. James' real estate.

Andrews served as canon missioner and an AMIA network leader in addition to being rector of Living Faith. In 2012, Living Faith moved to the Diocese of Western Anglicans, which had been founded upon the creation of the Anglican Church in North America. Andrews served from 2013 to 2014 as the diocese's regional dean for Arizona and Nevada.

== Episcopacy ==
In May 2014, the Diocese of Western Anglicans elected Andrews to be the second diocesan bishop, succeeding Bill Thompson, who had announced his retirement for June 2014 for health reasons. Andrews' election was given consent by the ACNA College of Bishops in October 2014. He was consecrated by ACNA Archbishop Foley Beach on January 25, 2015, in Newport Beach, California.In October 2017, Andrews dedicated All Saints Anglican Church in Long Beach as the diocesan cathedral.

In 2016, Andrews joined fellow ACNA Bishops Eric Menees, Mark Zimmerman, Kevin Bond Allen, and Todd Hunter to streamline the ordination process in western U.S. ACNA dioceses, with a joint exam and a joint examining board that would allow clergy ordained under the standards to serve in any participating diocese. At the provincial level, in 2020 Andrews co-chaired with Alphonza Gadsden an ACNA task force on race, racism and racial reconciliation.

In August 2023, Andrews announced his intention to retire in early 2025, beginning an election process for a new Western Anglicans diocesan bishop. He was succeeded by Phil Ashey in March 2025.

Anglican Communion titles
Preceded by Bill Thompson	II Bishop of Western Anglicans; 2015–2025	Succeeded by Phil Ashey
