= AYI =

AYI may refer to:

- Ambridge Youth Ignite, an incubated ministry of Rock the World Youth Mission Alliance
- Aster Yellows Index, an index used to determine when to apply chemical controls in order to control the spread of aster yellows phytoplasma
- AYI (company), an American electronics company

== See also ==
- Ayi (disambiguation)
