= Anglican Unscripted =

Weekly video podcast on Anglicanism

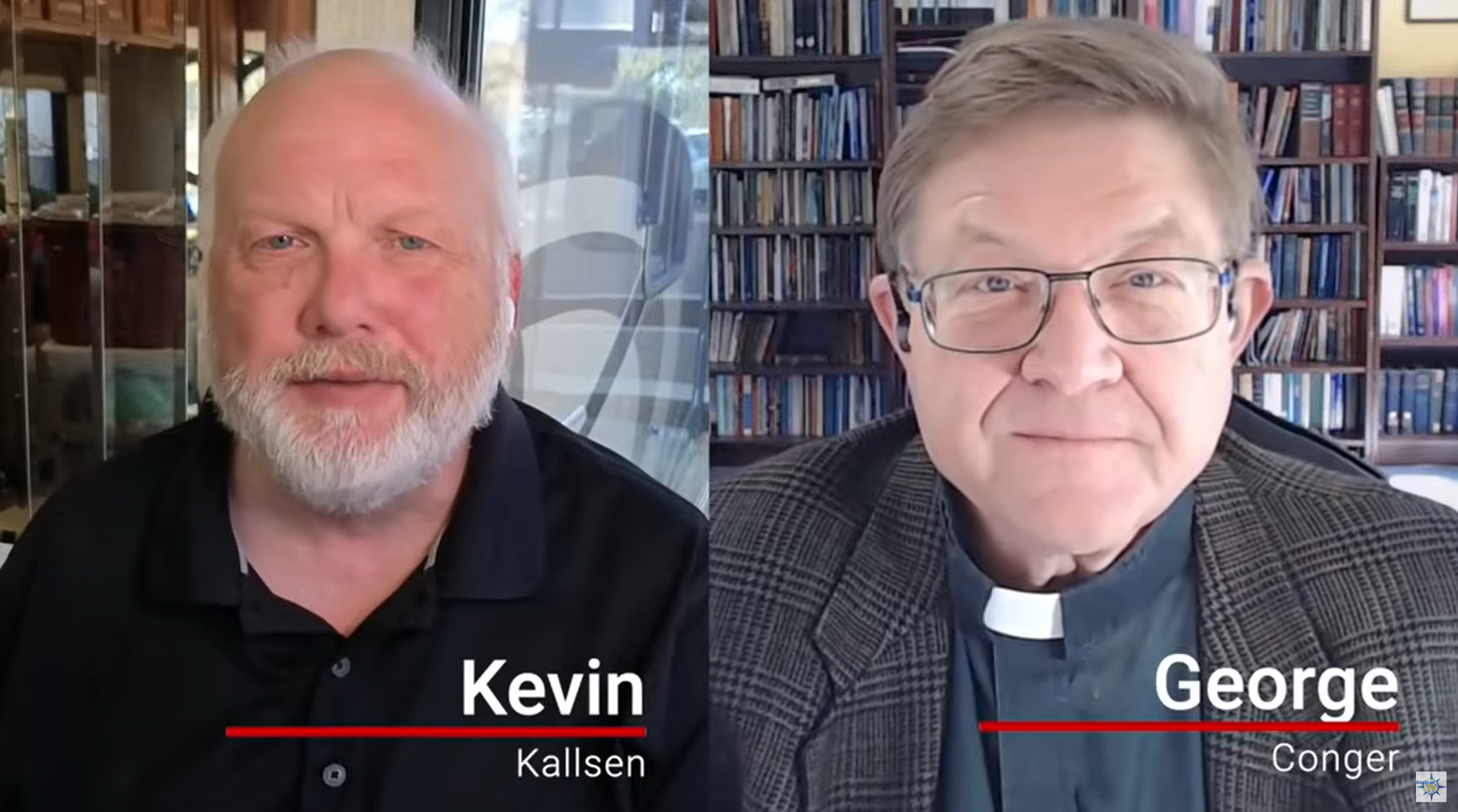
- A screen capture from a 2025 Anglican Unscripted episode
- Genre: News talk Opinion journalism
- Format: Video
- Country of origin: United States
- Language: English

Cast and voices
- Hosted by: Kevin Kallsen; George Conger

Publication
- No. of episodes: 958 (as of March 25, 2026)
- Original release: 2011
- Provider: AnglicanTV Ministries
- Updates: Active
- License: Creative Commons CC-BY

Related
- Adaptations: Anglican Ink
- Website: YouTube page

Anglican Unscripted is a video podcast series providing news analysis and commentary on churches in the Anglican Communion and Anglican realignment movement. Presented weekly on YouTube and in audio formats, it first appeared in 2011. The hosts are Kevin Kallsen, a layman in the Anglican Church in North America, and George Conger, a priest in the Episcopal Church and former freelance journalist covering Anglicanism. Previous regular hosts have included former Anglican clergyman Gavin Ashenden. The series has been described as popular, attracting thousands of viewers, and representing a theologically conservative point of view within Anglicanism.

== History ==
Kallsen was an Episcopalian layman who became active in church matters in Connecticut during the Anglican realignment in the 2000s, starting a blog on Anglican issues that evolved into a vlog and eventually AnglicanTV Ministries, a nonprofit organization that publishes the blog Anglican Ink and the Anglican Unscripted podcast. He has traveled to six continents to cover Anglican issues. Conger is an Episcopal priest in the Diocese of Central Florida. In addition to being a parish rector, Conger has also been a correspondent on Anglican issues for The Jerusalem Post, the Church of England Newspaper and The Living Church. His freelance work has appeared in The Times, The Daily Telegraph, The Guardian and The Washington Post, among other outlets.

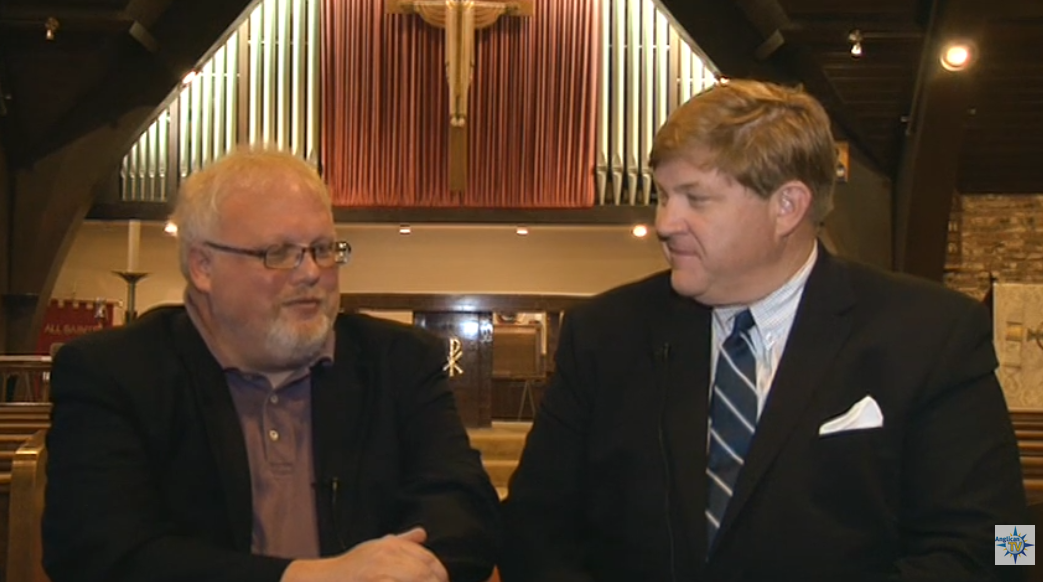
Kallsen (left) and Conger host the first episode of Anglican Unscripted at All Saints Anglican Church in Long Beach, California, in June 2011.

Anglican Unscripted began in 2011. The first episode was recorded at All Saints Anglican Church, where Kallsen and Conger were covering meetings of the ACNA's Provincial Council.

Gavin Ashenden joined the podcast as a co-host around the time he left the Church of England in 2017. By 2020, following his conversion to Roman Catholicism, Ashenden left Anglican Unscripted.

In 2025, Anglican Unscripted's coverage of the ecclesiastical trial of Stewart Ruch was featured in the Washington Post, which quoted Conger asking whether "the ACNA has integrity at the very top anymore?" and Kallsen addressing ACNA leadership by saying "You have evolved from something glorious into something hideous." The podcast also covered the controversy around the withdrawal from the ACNA by the Jurisdiction of the Armed Forces and Chaplaincy nonprofit and allegations of misconduct against ACNA Archbishop Steve Wood, with Conger describing the ACNA's structure as a "quasi-Roman Catholic papal system" and urging the province to "clean up its own internal act."

== Format ==
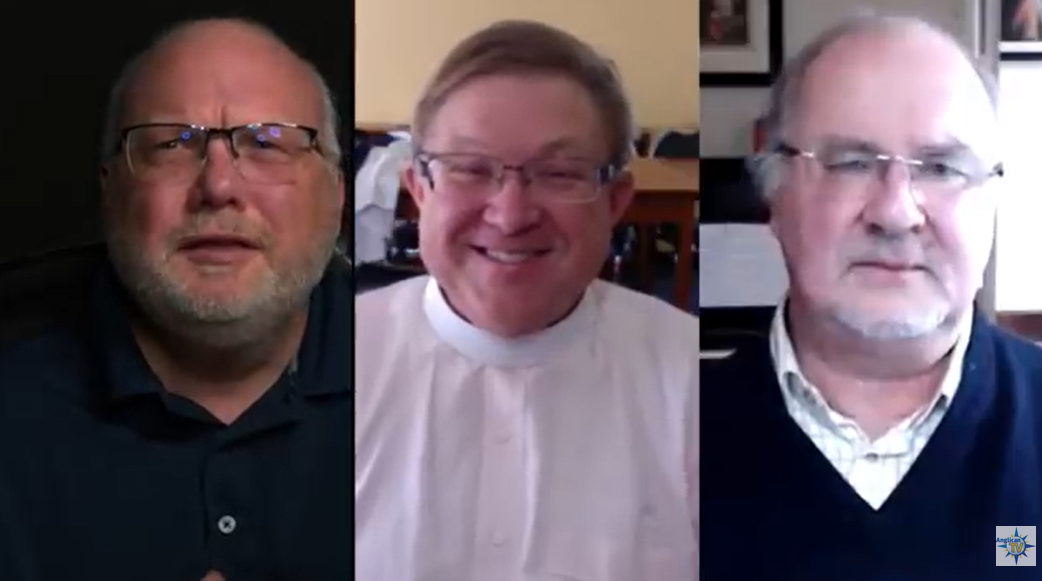
From left, Kallsen, Conger and Ashenden co-host an episode of Anglican Unscripted in January 2020.

The podcast usually features Kallsen and Conger discussing several news items related to Anglican churches. They record the podcast remotely from separate locations and appear side-by-side in the videos. The series has been described as a "video newscast" and an "Anglican affairs video podcast with a conservative point of view."

The series features occasional guests; notable interviewees have included Keith Ackerman, Phil Ashey, Foley Beach, Glenn Davies, Julian Dobbs, Paul Donison, Robert Duncan, John Fenwick, Terrell Glenn, Alan Hawkins, David L. Hicks, Peter Jensen, Benjamin Kwashi, Andy Lines, Thomas McKenzie, Calvin Robinson, Melvin Tinker, Carl Trueman, Gregory Venables and Steve Wood.

== Reception ==
Baptist News Global described Anglican Unscripted as a "popular independent news and analysis show in the Anglosphere." The Washington Post noted that each weekly episode receives thousands of listeners. Theologian Christopher Brittain noted in 2015 that "the influence of websites like AnglicanTV is powerful in scope and effect."

In 2015, Brittain criticized "online editorials such as that of Conger and Kallsen" for "cross[ing] the boundary that separates truth from truthiness." Brittain alleged that Conger misrepresented remarks by Archbishop of Sydney Peter Jensen at the 2013 Global Anglican Future Conference and misrepresented what Archbishop of Canterbury Justin Welby said in a 2013 interview with The Church of Ireland Gazette. Brittain and co-author Andrew McKinnon said that in Anglican Unscripted videos, "details were omitted to support a specific interpretation of a given situation."
