= Somerset Anglican Fellowship =

Historic church in Somerset, Pennsylvania, United States

Coordinates: 40°00′33″N 79°04′39″W

- Formerly St. Paul's Presbyterian Church
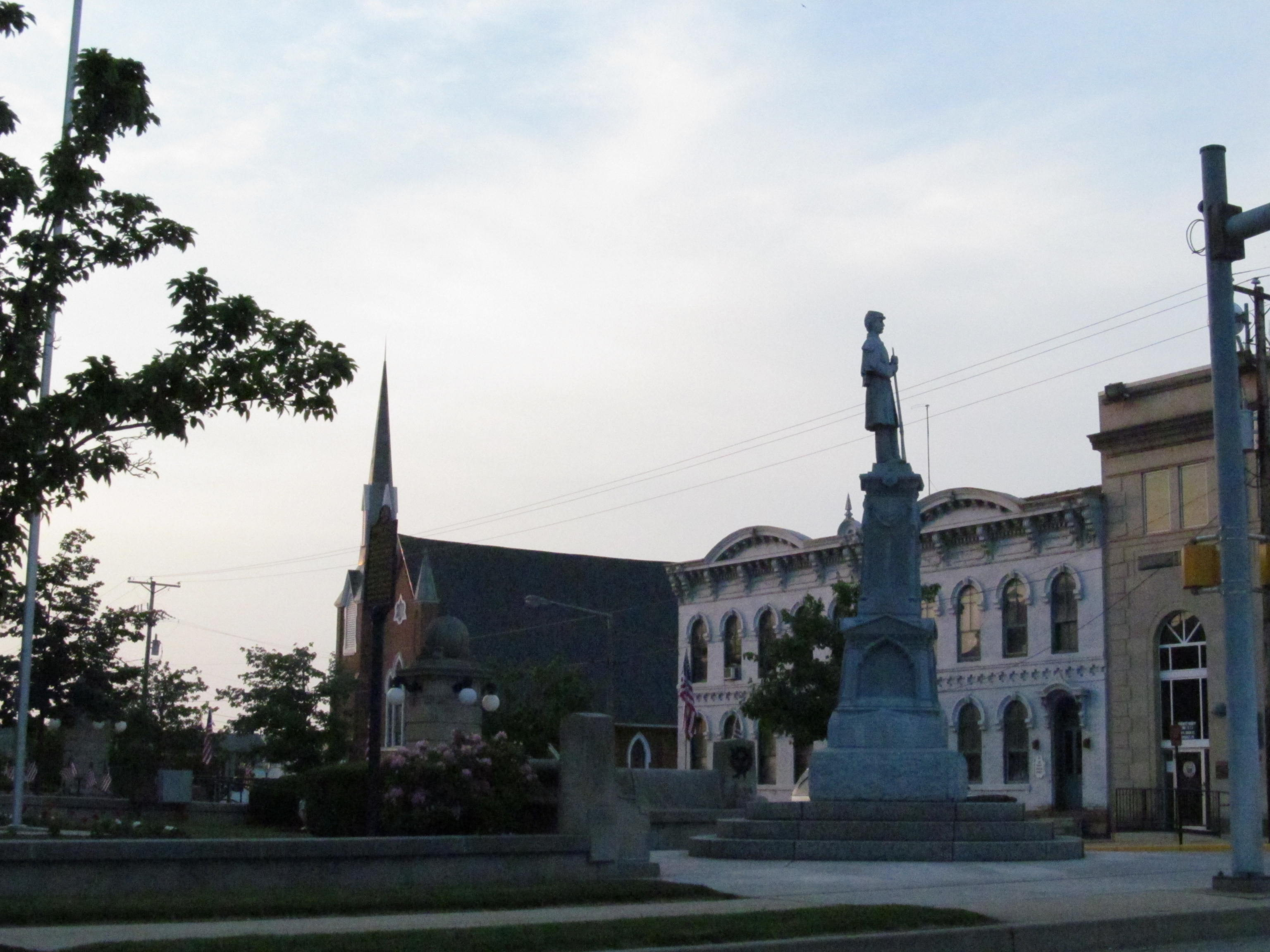
- The Soldier's Monument in Somerset, Pennsylvania, pictured in the foreground with Somerset Anglican Fellowship (formerly St. Paul's Presbyterian Church) in the background.
- Location: 132 East Union Street, Somerset, Pennsylvania
- Country: United States
- Denomination: Anglican Church in North America
- Website: somersetanglicans.wixsite.com/home

History
- Founded: 2008
- Founder: The Rt. Rev. Mark Zimmerman

Architecture
- Architect: C. G. Bassett
- Style: Gothic Revival
- Years built: 1876

Administration
- Diocese: Pittsburgh

Clergy
- Rector: The Rev. John Corbett
- St. Paul's Presbyterian Church
- U.S. Historic district – Contributing property
- Part of: Uptown Somerset Historic District (ID95001254)
- Added to NRHP: November 7, 1995

Somerset Anglican Fellowship is a historic church building in Somerset, Pennsylvania. Completed in 1876 as St. Paul's Presbyterian Church, the church is a contributing property to the Uptown Somerset Historic District. and listed on the American Presbyterian/Reformed Historic Sites Registry

== History ==
=== History of St. Paul's ===
St. Paul's Presbyterian Church was organized in 1810 and shared a facility with St. Paul's Reformed Church until 1857, when it moved to 132 East Union Street. The first church on that site burned in 1872. In 1876, the present-day Gothic Revival church was erected to a design by C. G. Bassett.

=== Anglican and Presbyterian realignment ===
In 2007, Mark Zimmerman had served for nearly a decade as rector of St. Francis-in-the-Fields Episcopal Church near Somerset. Part of the Episcopal Diocese of Pittsburgh, St. Francis had grown from a 30-member congregation to nearly 100 in Sunday attendance and debt-free status for the first time in its history. That year―the year before the majority of the diocese voted to leave the Episcopal Church as part of the Anglican realignment, thus forming the Anglican Diocese of Pittsburgh―Zimmerman announced his departure from the Episcopal Church.

Meanwhile, St. Paul's Presbyterian Church was considering whether to disaffiliate from the Presbyterian Church (USA) over concerns about the liberalizing theological direction of the denomination. It was unclear at the time whether St. Paul's would be able to retain its building. Zimmerman and Keith Fink, pastor of St. Paul's, explored combining their disaffiliated congregations and forming a new church.

Ultimately, in 2008, 80 percent of St. Francis's members followed Zimmerman in leaving the Episcopal Church, and the new congregation, called Somerset Anglican Fellowship, left its building and began meeting at a local mall. Also in 2008, St. Paul's was dismissed from the PC(USA)'s Presbytery of Redstone―while being permitted to keep its property―and joined the Evangelical Presbyterian Church. Ultimately, the two congregations elected not to merge. St. Paul's built a new church at 1845 North Center Street and sold the historic church to Somerset Anglican Fellowship in 2011.

== Architecture ==
The Gothic Revival building on East Union includes a corner tower spire on the northeast corner, where Union meets Court Avenue, and a false tower at the northwest corner. The façade includes incised brickwork forming a row of crosses along the first floor, a pattern repeated in other Somerset buildings erected after the fire. The church's stained glass sanctuary windows were made by Herman T. Gernhardt of Baltimore. A brick-clad addition in the rear of the church was completed in 1956.

== Bibliography ==
- Van Sickel, E. Lincoln (2023). The Building of a Church: The Story of St Paul's Presbyterian Church in Somerset Pennsylvania. ISBN 979-8363139819.
