= Ayi =

Ayi may refer to:

- Ayi (given name), a unisex given name
- Ayi language, a Sepik language spoken by approximately 400 people
- Anong people or Anong language of China (a misreading of the Chinese characters)
- A term for a domestic helper used by English speakers in China

== See also ==
- AYI (disambiguation)
