= Uptown Somerset Historic District =

Historic district in Pennsylvania, United States

- U.S. National Register of Historic Places
- U.S. Historic district
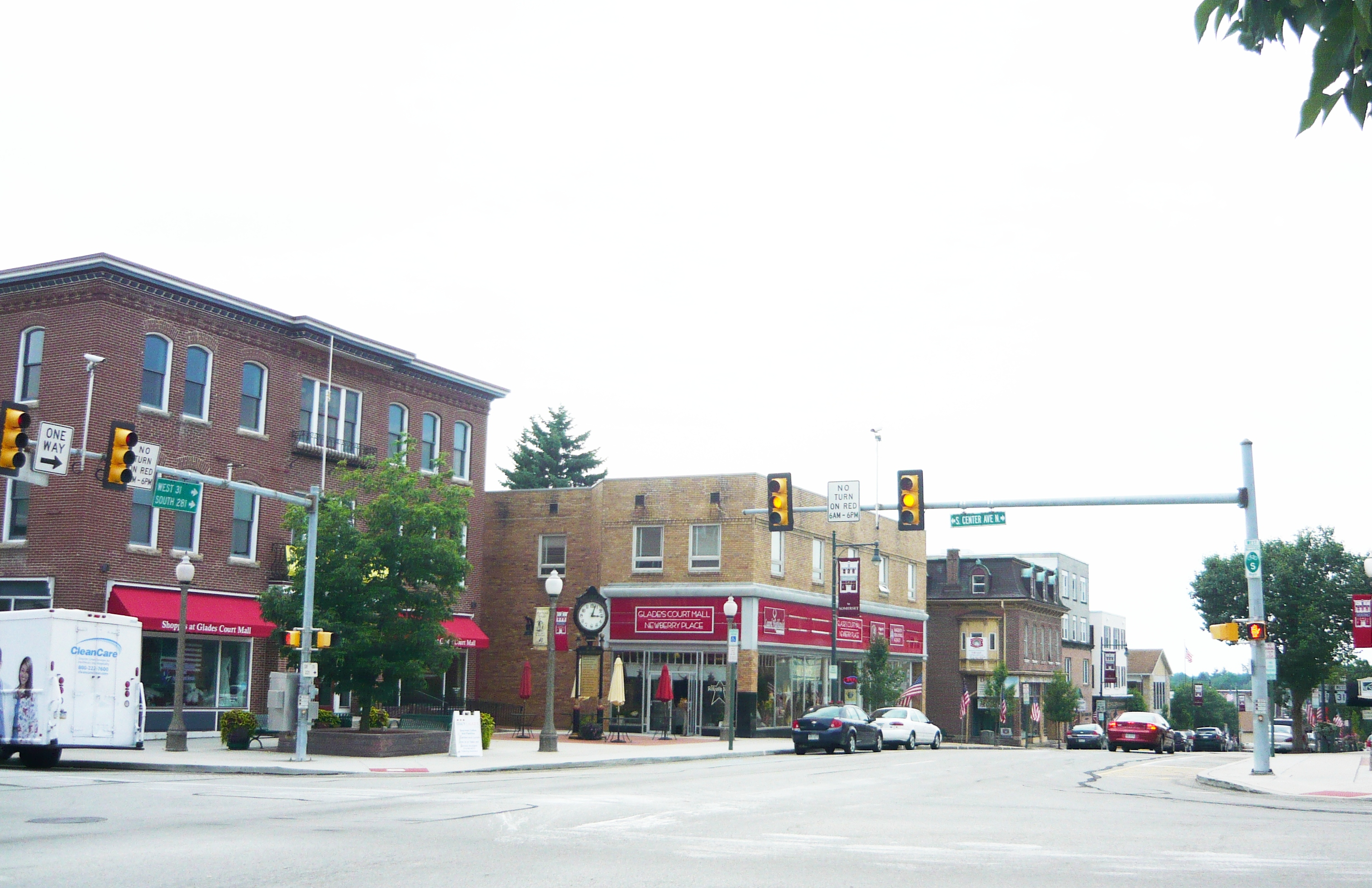
- West Main Street

- Location within Pennsylvania Location within the United States
- Location: Roughly bounded by N. Kimbery, Main, Columbia, and W. Catherine Sts., Somerset, Pennsylvania
- Coordinates: 40°00′37″N 79°04′48″W
- Area: 60.2 acres (24.4 ha)
- Built: 1872
- Architect: Purcell & Fry
- Architectural style: Italianate, Classical Revival, Second Empire
- NRHP reference No.: 95001254, 97000286 (Boundary Increase)
- Added to NRHP: November 7, 1995, March 28, 1997 (Boundary Increase)

The Uptown Somerset Historic District is a national historic district that is located in Somerset in Somerset County, Pennsylvania.

It was listed on the National Register of Historic Places in 1995, with a boundary increase in 1997.

== History and architectural features ==
This district includes 190 contributing buildings, one contributing site, and one contributing object. It encompasses an area centered on the county government complex and Somerset County Courthouse, with the surrounding commercial district, residential areas, and cemetery.

Notable buildings include the former Somerset Trust Company Building (1906), the First National Bank (1922), the county jail and sheriff's residence (1856, 1889), the Lansberry House (1869), the Edward Scull House (1847), the former Somerset Academy (1882), Printing House Row (1872), the former St. Paul's Presbyterian Church (1876), St. Paul's United Church of Christ (1887), the IOOF Building (1889), and First Christian Church (1909-1912).
