= Gaylord J. Clarke =

American newspaper editor, lawyer and politician (1836–1870)

- Born: February 25, 1836; Owego, New York U.S.
- Died: December 7, 1870 (aged 34); El Paso, Texas U.S.
- Political party: Democratic, Republican

Gaylord Judd Clarke (February 25, 1836 in Owego, Tioga County, New York – December 7, 1870 in El Paso, Texas) was an American newspaper editor, lawyer, poet and politician from New York and Texas.

== Life ==
He graduated from Union College in 1859. He married Frances H. Corey (daughter of Hon. Allen Corey, of Troy, New York). He edited the Lockport Advertiser from 1860 to 1863.

In 1862, he was elected on the Democratic ticket an Inspector of State Prisons, being in office from 1863 to 1865. Afterwards he removed to Plattsmouth, Nebraska.

He studied law, and was admitted to the bar on July 19, 1869. In July, 1870, Governor Edmund J. Davis appointed him, as a Republican, Judge of the 25th Judicial District of Texas. In October 1870, Clarke became a co-founder of the first Protestant church in El Paso, the Church of St. Clement (so named in memory his deceased son). The senior Clarke was shot dead in the street by lawyer Benjamin F. Williams after a gunfight between Williams and Albert Jennings Fountain in Ben Dowell's Saloon in El Paso.

== Sources ==
- The New York Civil List compiled by Franklin Benjamin Hough, Stephen C. Hutchins and Edgar Albert Werner (1867; pages 411 and 507)
- QUERIES AND ANSWERS in NYT on March 13, 1919
- Encyclopedia of Western Gunfighters by Bill O'Neal (republished by University of Oklahoma Press, 1991, ISBN 0-8061-2335-4, ISBN 978-0-8061-2335-6 ; page 112)
- His widow's second marriage, at RootsWeb
