= David Anderson (American bishop) =

American Anglican bishop

The Right Reverend David Anderson
- President of the American Anglican Council
- Church: Anglican Church in North America/Church of Nigeria
- Diocese: Convocation of Anglicans in North America
- In office: 2001–2016
- Predecessor: James M. Stanton
- Successor: Phil Ashey

Orders
- Consecration: 2007 by Peter Akinola

Personal details
- Born: August 1944 (age 82)

David Craig Anderson Sr. (born August 1944) is an American Anglican bishop. He was a suffragan bishop of the Convocation of Anglicans in North America (CANA) in the Anglican Church in North America and the Church of Nigeria.

== Ecclesiastical career ==
Anderson spent several decades as a priest in the Episcopal Church, including as rector of St. James Episcopal Church, Newport Beach, in the Episcopal Diocese of Los Angeles, from which he retired in 2002. In 2000, Anderson was elected president and CEO of the American Anglican Council, which represented for the theologically conservative wing of the Episcopal Church. Anderson eventually left the Episcopal Church as part of the Anglican realignment movement. He joined CANA, the missionary body of the Church of Nigeria in the United States and Canada on All Saints Day, 1 November 2006 and was consecrated suffragan bishop of the CANA in 2007. Anderson joined the Anglican Church in North America, upon its foundation, in June 2009, of which both CANA and AAC were founding bodies.

Anderson stepped down as AAC CEO in 2014 and later as president, although he remained chairman of the AAC board until 2026.

Religious titles
Preceded by James M. Stanton	President of the American Anglican Council; 2001–2016	Succeeded by Phil Ashey
