= Anglican Diocese of the Southwest =

Anglican diocese in the United States and Mexico

Diocese of the Southwest
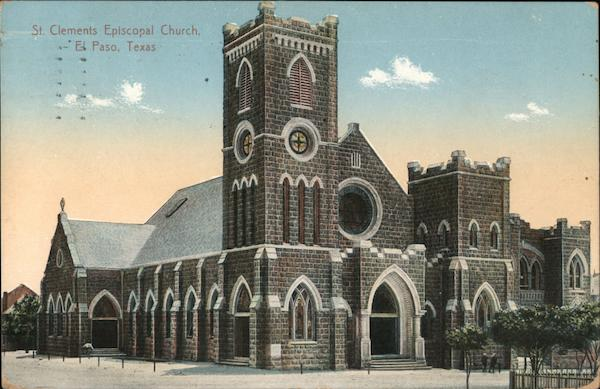
- St. Clement's Anglican Church, El Paso, Texas―the diocese's largest church―pictured in a 1910 postcard.

Location
- Ecclesiastical province: Anglican Church in North America

Statistics
- Parishes: 22 (2025)
- Members: 1,949 (2025)

Information
- Rite: Anglican

Current leadership
- Bishop: Steven Tighe

Website
- anglicansw.org

The Anglican Diocese of the Southwest is a diocese of the Anglican Church in North America. It has 22 parishes, 8 in New Mexico, 6 in West Texas and one in Colorado, in the United States, and 7 in Mexico. The diocese was approved as a diocese-in-formation at the General Convention of 2012 and given full diocese status one year later, in June 2013.

== History ==
The diocese origin goes back to the Anglican Fellowship of the South, where nine Anglican churches of New Mexico and Texas in the first meeting of their Standing Committee, on 26 May 2011, agreed to apply to become a diocese-in-formation of the Anglican Church in North America, during their Provincial Council. The first synod of the Anglican Fellowship of the South took place at Christ the King Anglican Church, in Albuquerque, New Mexico, on 13–14 May 2011, having approved a constitution for the new diocese-in-formation and elected unanimously Win Mott to serve as their Vicar General, which he was until 2014.

The Anglican Church in North America General Convention ratified the admission of the Anglican Diocese of the Southwest as a diocese-in-formation in June 2012. The following year, it was approved as a full diocese.

The College of Bishops of ACNA consented at the election of Mark Zimmerman as the first Bishop of the Diocese of the Southwest at 10 January 2014. He was consecrated at 28 February 2014 at the Church of St. Clement, El Paso, Texas.

A Special Synod of the Anglican Diocese of the Southwest held on 12 December 2020 elected Steven Tighe as the second bishop of the diocese, to be consecrated on 6 March 2021.

In 2022, the diocese reported 22 congregations with 1,949 members (up 36% from 2022) and an average Sunday attendance of 1,386 (up 42% from 2022).
