= Steven Tighe =

American Anglican bishop (born 1956)

The Right Reverend Steven Tighe
- Bishop of the Southwest
- Church: Anglican Church in North America
- Diocese: Southwest
- In office: 2021–present
- Predecessor: Mark Zimmerman
- Previous post(s): Canon for Youth Ministries, ACNA

Orders
- Consecration: March 6, 2021 by Foley Beach

Personal details
- Born: 1956 (age 68–69)

Steven Nixon Tighe (born 1956) is an American Anglican bishop. He is currently serving as the second bishop of the Anglican Diocese of the Southwest, which has jurisdiction in west Texas, New Mexico and Mexico, prior to which he was canon for youth ministries in the Anglican Church in North America.

== Early life and education ==
Tighe was born in 1956 in Texas to Charles L. Tighe and the former Mary Nixon. He was raised in the Episcopal Church. He received two degrees in electrical engineering from Rice University and worked in computer research in Austin, where he met his future wife, Tricia, at an Episcopal church. Steven and Tricia Tighe have two adult children.

After being called to ordained ministry, Tighe later received an M.Div. from Trinity School for Ministry and a PhD from Trinity Evangelical Divinity School. While at TSM in Ambridge, Pennsylvania, Tighe worked with Rock the World Youth Mission Alliance.

== Ordained ministry ==
Tighe's professional work focused on youth. In 2013, as president of the Young Anglicans Project, then-Archbishop Robert Duncan asked Tighe and his team to develop resources for connecting with youth in the ACNA. Tighe and a team of Anglican youth ministers developed a training program called Engage to equip laypeople in ACNA dioceses and congregations to minister to youth. He also founded La Frontera Youth Ministry Education in El Paso. Tighe was appointed canon for youth ministries in the ACNA in 2016.

On December 12, 2020, the Diocese of the Southwest elected Tighe as its second diocesan bishop. He was consecrated at the Church of St. Clement in El Paso by Archbishop Foley Beach on March 6, 2021.

Anglican Communion titles
Preceded by Mark Zimmerman	II Bishop of the Southwest; 2021–present	Succeeded by incumbent
