= Phil Ashey =

American Anglican bishop

The Right Reverend Phil Ashey
- Bishop of Western Anglicans
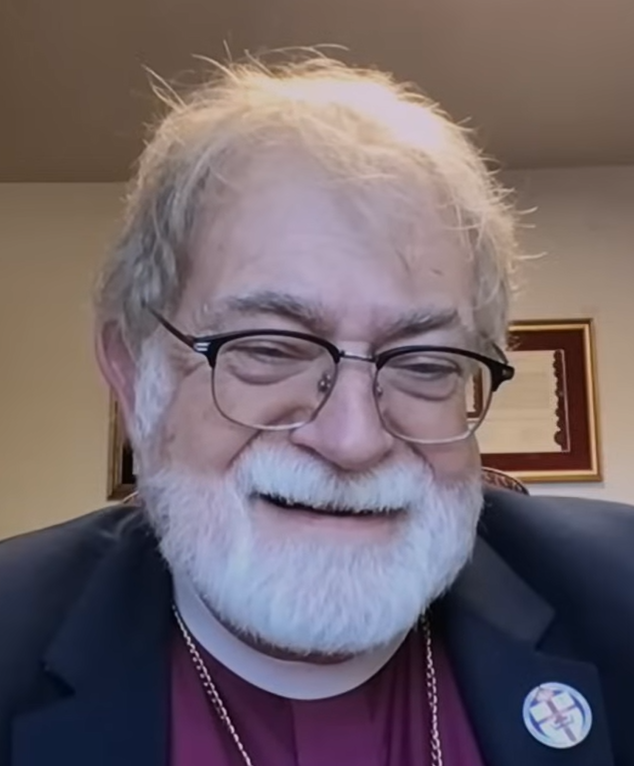
- Ashey interviewed on Anglican Unscripted in October 2025.
- Church: Anglican Church in North America
- Diocese: Western Anglicans
- In office: 2025–present
- Predecessor: Keith Andrews
- Other posts: President, American Anglican Council

Orders
- Consecration: March 29, 2025 by Steve Wood

Personal details
- Born: 1955 or 1956 (age 69–70)
- Spouse: Julie Einarsson (m. 1981)
- Children: 5
- Education: Stanford University (B.A.); Loyola Law School (J.D.) General Theological Seminary (M.Div.); Cardiff University (LL.M.)

John Philip Ashey III is an American Anglican bishop and attorney. Since 2025, he has been the third bishop of the Diocese of Western Anglicans in the Anglican Church in North America (ACNA). Ordained in the Episcopal Church, he was a key figure in the Anglican realignment as the first of a wave of Virginia Episcopal priests to disaffiliate. As a canon lawyer and head of the American Anglican Council (AAC), he was involved in the founding of the ACNA and the development of the Global Fellowship of Confessing Anglicans (Gafcon) and the Global South Fellowship of Anglican Churches (GSFA) as counterweights to the Anglican Communion structures.

== Early life, education and ordination ==
Ashey's father was an Episcopal priest who served as rector of St. James Episcopal Church in Newport Beach, California. Ashey was raised in Southern California, attended Phillips Exeter Academy and graduated from Stanford University in 1978. In 1981, he married Julie Einarsson, and a year later, he graduated from Loyola Law School The Asheys had five children, one of whom died in infancy.

Ashey began his career as a prosecutor in Orange County, but at age 29, he followed a longtime call to ministry and entered the General Theological Seminary, graduating in 1988. Ashey initially served in churches in the Episcopal Diocese of Los Angeles. From 1992 to 1999, Ashey was a priest at Church of the Apostles in Fairfax, Virginia. The Asheys moved to McKeesport, Pennsylvania, where Ashey was rector of St. Stephen's Church from 1999 to 2002. In 2002, he returned to Virginia to lead South Riding Episcopal Church, a two-year-old church plant in the Diocese of Virginia.

== Anglican realignment ==
In November 2005, South Riding became the first of several churches in the Diocese of Virginia to seek to disaffiliate with the Episcopal Church as part of the broader Anglican Realignment. Ashey resigned as missioner and all but two of the congregation voted to affiliate with the Anglican Diocese of Rwenzori of the Church of Uganda. While the church plant did not own a building, Ashey turned over the congregation's personal property to the diocese. The bishop of Virginia rejected Ashey's claim to be under the canonical authority of the Ugandan bishop and interpreted his resignation as a "renunciation of ordained ministry" under the Episcopal Church's canons.

In 2008, Ashey joined the American Anglican Council as chief operating and development officer. As a priest then canonically resident in Uganda, he was appointed by the Church of Uganda to represent the church at the 2009 Anglican Consultative Council meeting in Kingston, Jamaica. However, ACC leadership refused to recognize Ashey's canonical status in Uganda and blocked him from participating. Ugandan bishops later said that it was the Church of Uganda's "prerogative to choose who should represent us," describing the denial of Ashey's participation in the ACC as "a profound violation of our rights by the Joint Standing Committee and the ACC."

== ACNA career ==
Ashey was named CEO of AAC in 2014 and succeeded David Anderson as president in 2016. Under his leadership, the AAC pivoted from its role in supporting theologically conservative congregations and clergy within the Episcopal Church to developing the newly formed Anglican Church in North America. Alongside three fellow future ACNA bishops―Paul Donison, Chip Edgar and Jim Hobby―Ashey was one of eight candidates for the role of bishop of Pittsburgh in 2016.

Ashey completed an LL.M. in canon law at Cardiff University in 2016. As a canon lawyer, he has been counsel to the ACNA College of Bishops, chair of the ACNA's Governance Task Force from 2014 to 2023 and a member of the ACNA's Provincial Tribunal. He has also been an adviser to the Gafcon Primates Council and the GSFA, serving as the drafter of GSFA's covenantal structure. In 2024. Ashey was elected to the board of the GSFA Assembly. In addition to his formal roles with Anglican bodies, Ashey has taught Anglican canon law in Uganda. Ashey is the author of the 2017 book Anglican Conciliarism: The Church Meeting to Decide Together.

In 2021, Ashey moved to St. Simon's Island, Georgia, to plant an Anglican church there. In 2024, the Diocese of Western Anglicans elected him to succeed Keith Andrews as the diocese's third bishop. Ashey was consecrated to the episcopacy in March 2025. He relinquished his role as AAC CEO but continued on as the council's president until February 2026.

After ACNA Archbishop Steve Wood was suspended from ministry and indicted for an ecclesiastical trial over charges of misconduct, Ashey served as a canonical adviser to Wood ahead of his trial. In a May 2026 lecture, Ashey predicted that Wood would be exonerated and described Wood's accusers as "aggrieved" and "terminated" former employees. After criticism by the standing committee of the Anglican Diocese of South Carolina, Ashey retracted his remarks and apologized for speculating about the trial outcome and for mischaracterizing the complainants, none of whom had been terminated.

Religious titles
Preceded by David Anderson	President of the American Anglican Council; 2016–2026	Succeeded by Mark Eldredge
Preceded by Keith Andrews	Bishop of Western Anglicans; 2025–present	Incumbent
