= Somerset County Courthouse (Pennsylvania) =

- U.S. National Register of Historic Places
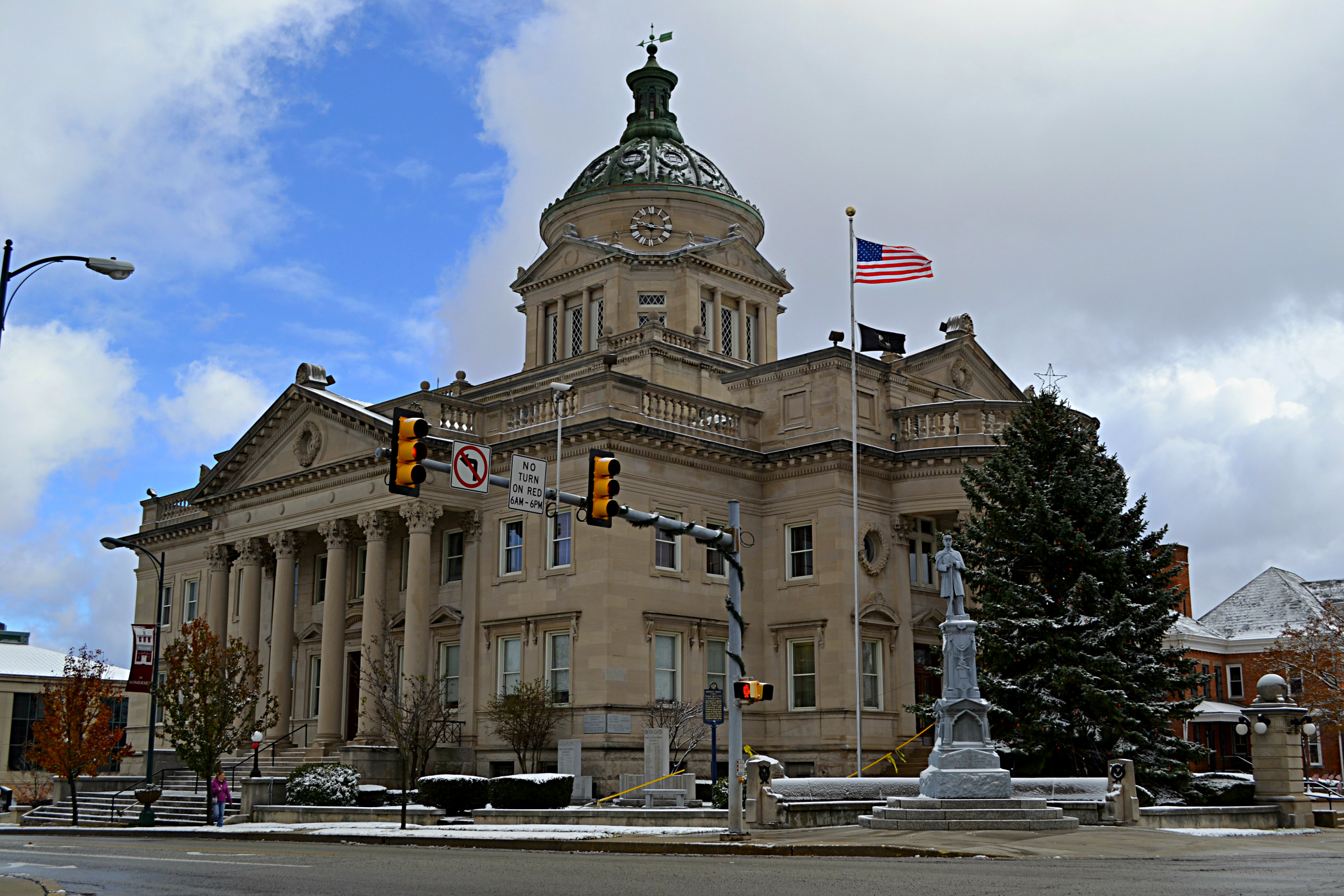
- Somerset County Courthouse

- Location within Pennsylvania Location within the United States
- Interactive map showing The location of Somerset County Courthouse
- Location: E. Union St. and N. Center Ave., Somerset, Pennsylvania
- Coordinates: 40°0′35″N 79°4′41″W
- Area: 1 acre (0.40 ha)
- Built: 1904-1906
- Built by: Caldwell and Drake
- Architect: J.C. Fulton
- Architectural style: Classical Revival
- NRHP reference No.: 80003634
- Added to NRHP: June 27, 1980

Somerset County Courthouse is a historic county courthouse building located at Somerset, Somerset County, Pennsylvania. It was built between 1904 and 1906, and is a two-story Classical Revival building measuring 146 feet by 112 feet, and 135 feet tall. It is built of Indiana limestone and sits on a sandstone foundation. The building has a terra cotta tile roof, and central tower with copper dome. It features a semicircular portico supported by four unfluted Corinthian order columns.

It was added to the National Register of Historic Places in 1980. It is located in the Uptown Somerset Historic District.

The Somerset County Soldiers' Monument (1888) stands at the northeast corner of Centre Avenue and Union Street, on courthouse grounds. About 100 feet east of it, between the courthouse and the old brick jail, stands the 142nd Pennsylvania Volunteer Infantry Monument (2003).

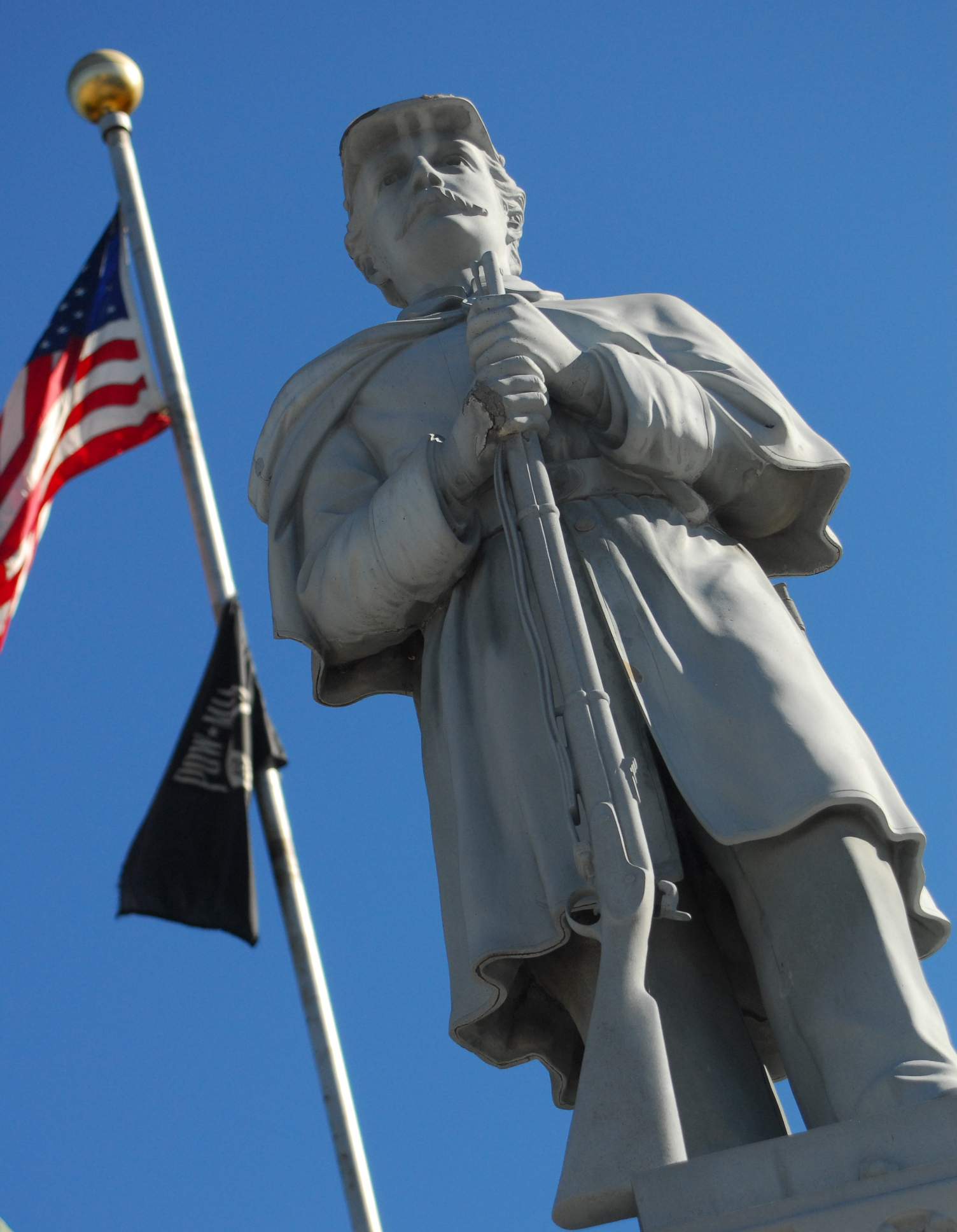
Somerset County Soldiers' Monument (1888)

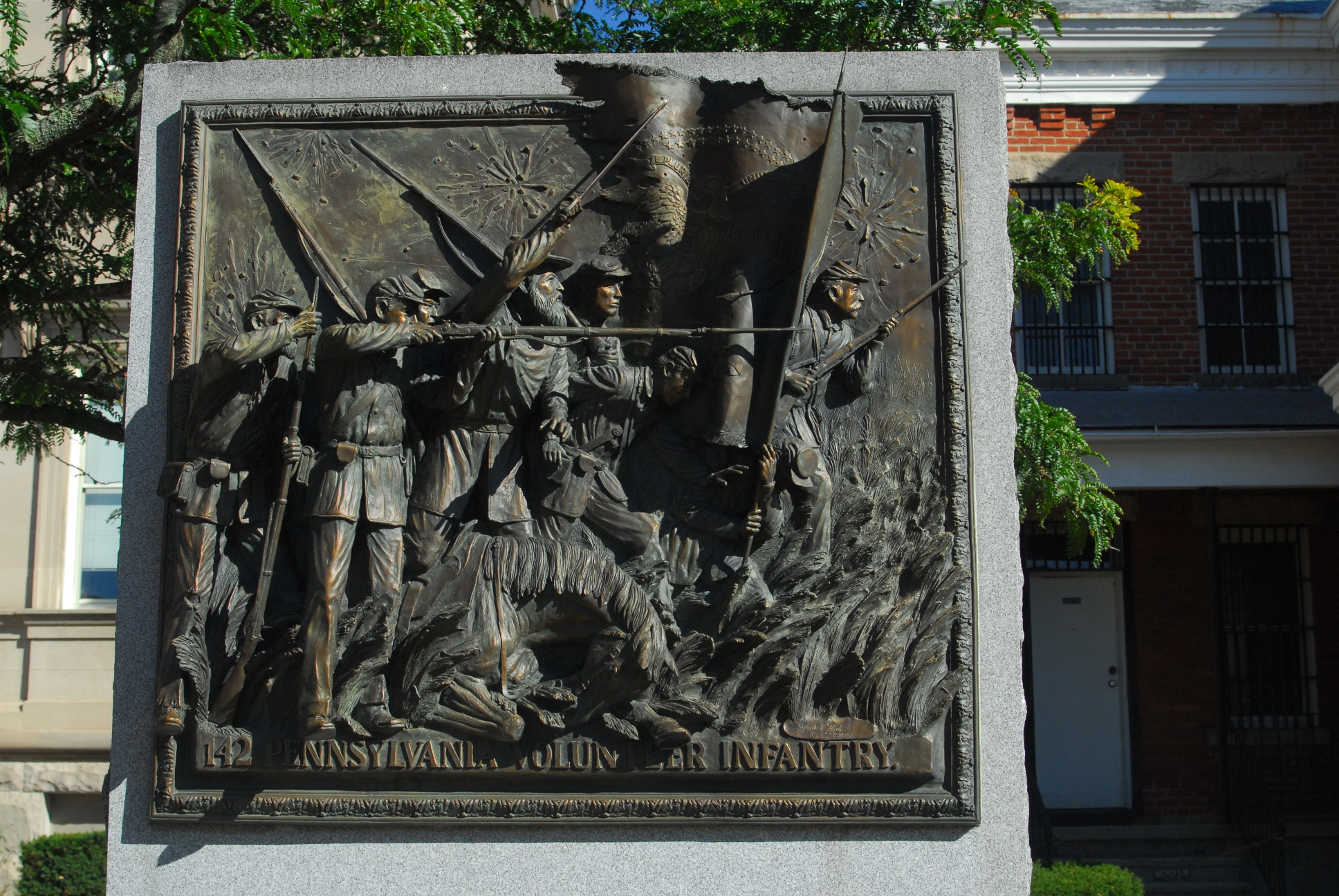
142nd Pennsylvania Volunteer Infantry Monument (2003)

== See also ==
- List of state and county courthouses in Pennsylvania
