= Diocese of Western Anglicans =

Anglican diocese in the United States

Location
- Ecclesiastical province: Anglican Church in North America

Statistics
- Parishes: 32 (2025)
- Members: 2,833 (2025)

Information
- Rite: Anglican
- Cathedral: All Saints Anglican Cathedral

Current leadership
- Bishop: The Rt. Rev. Phil Ashey
- Suffragan: The Rt. Rev. Mark Zimmerman

Website
- westernanglicans.org

The Diocese of Western Anglicans is a diocese of the Anglican Church in North America founding diocese. It has congregations in the American states of California, Arizona, Nevada, Utah, Idaho, Montana, Wyoming, with the latter four states comprising the diocese's Yellowstone Missionary District. Founded in 2009 alongside the ACNA, its diocesan cathedral is located in Long Beach, California.

== History ==
The process that led to the birth of the diocese was started when 14 parishes from Southern California and Arizona, who had left The Episcopal Church and were under the supervision of the Anglican Church of the Southern Cone of America and the Church of Uganda, held a meeting of 60 delegates in June 2007. They adopted the Theological Statement of the Common Cause Partnership and elected an Executive Committee. In October 2007, at the reunion of the House of the Delegates it was decided to launch the Association of Western Anglicans Congregations and the Diocese of Western Anglicans as a diocese-in-formation. They joined the Common Cause Partnership in 2008 and formed the new diocese who was recognized as a member of the Anglican Church in North America in their Provincial Assembly held in Dallas, Texas, in April 2009. The diocese had then 21 parishes and an average Sunday attendance of 2,000. Rev. William Thompson was elected the diocesan bishop at the College of Bishops of the first Provincial Assembly of the ACNA in 19–20 June 2009. On October 10, 2014, the Anglican Church of North America elected Keith Andrews as the second bishop of the diocese. He was consecrated on January 25, 2015, at St. Andrew's Presbyterian Church, in Newport Beach, California.

In 2025, the diocese reported 32 congregations (down 11% from 2022) with 2,833 members (down 4% from 2022) and average Sunday attendance of 2,497 (up 17% from 2022).

== Bishops ==
1. Bill Thompson (2009–2014)
2. Keith Andrews (2015–2025)
3. Phil Ashey (2025–present)
