= Ayi (given name) =

Ayi is a unisex given name. Notable people with the name include:

- Ayi Jihu (born 1984), Chinese singer
- Ayi Kwei Armah (born 1939), Ghanaian writer
- Ayi Sutarno (21st century), Indonesian tennis player
- Vissinto Ayi d'Almeida (21st century), Beninese diplomat
