= Rock the World Youth Mission Alliance =

Christian ministry

Rock the World Logo

Rock the World Youth Mission Alliance is a Christian ministry that trains young people as leaders. Their core training programs create an ongoing network of relationships where the grads and trainees collaborate to offer events and conferences, generate new ministries, and support one another in life and ministry.

Among other programs, Rock the World currently runs the Josiah Project, a summer collegiate leadership initiative; re:mix, a Great Commission conference for young people in college and high school; Third Culture Kid events for teens whose parents serve as Christian missionaries; "Striking Fire", a basic seminar in how to launch and lead local church youth ministry; and "Next Step" retreats for kids in middle school through high school. Rock the World's activities exist predominantly inside the USA but extend globally.

Mission of Rock the World Rock the World's mission is to “engage, equip and empower young people to advance God's Kingdom.” The longer version of their mission states “Rock the World’s mission is to mobilize young people to follow Jesus, grow together in knowledge and love of God, serve in the power of the Spirit, and impact the world for the Kingdom of God.” Both versions emphasize the capacity of Jesus' young disciples to make more disciples. The long-term goal of RtW is to ignite a spiritual awakening among young people on every continent.

Rock the World is not legally a part of any denomination. At its founding, Rock the World was informally associated with the Episcopal Church. By the end of the 1990s this association had broadened to include a wide range of denominations. Although Rock the World is officially independent of any denomination, Anglican influence still finds expression through the involvement of so many Anglicans in the ministry. The Anglican Church in North America often involves Rock the World in their student ministries.

== Founder ==
The Rev. Whis Hays founded Rock the World in 1989. After 14 years in ministry with college, high school, and middle school young people, he saw the need for a new ministry that gave leverage to the energy, dedication, and fresh insight of young Christian leaders. His published works include numerous articles and films, the best known of which are his 1995 article “Arresting the New Sexual McCarthyism” and his 1980 film, “Jesus, Head of the Church.” He is also known for 16 years of teaching youth ministry courses as Associate Professor of Youth Ministry at Trinity School for Ministry, teaching there while serving in his position as Rock the World’s Executive Director. For ten years he was also Assistant Director of Trinity's Stanway Institute of World Mission and Evangelism.

== Name ==
The organization derives its name from the Bible's Book of Acts, chapter 17 verse 6. The story makes it clear that Paul and his friends were not trying to make trouble, but only trying to speak about Jesus and act according to the Kingdom of God. Obviously, sometimes this shook up things around them! When young followers of Jesus do the same thing today, it's not unusual for them to get similar results.

== Primary Programs ==
Josiah Project: In 1990 Rock the World launched the Josiah Project, a two-summer leadership program for college students. "JP" prepares students for a lifetime of leadership by giving them classroom training, hands-on experience, and the opportunity to launch new ministries. Josiah graduates are proving to be effective leaders: more than 90% of Josiah graduates continue to be involved in Christian ministry leadership today. [citation needed] Josiah Project is ordinarily led by a recent Josiah Project graduate. Sarah Golder, Rock the World's Assistant Executive Director, currently serves in that role.

Historically, a second major program was Rock the World's Student Ministry Professionals Program. Starting in 1991 RtW offered the first master's degree in youth ministry anywhere in the worldwide Anglican Communion in partnership with Trinity School for Ministry. Graduates prepared for a career in youth ministry through the local church. This program was offered for 15 years, through Spring Semester of 2006. The basic content of this training is still available through Rock the World's Striking Fire seminars.

== Incubated Ministries ==
Rock the World has become the platform for a number of new ministries launched by their graduates and trainees, some of which become anongoing part of Rock the World. Current programs and ministries that express this feature of Rock the World include Sonward Youth Programs; Heart for Jamaica; and Good Shepherd Anglican Church of Longview, TX.

Another example is re:mix is a "Great Commission" conference launched in 2003 for young adults and high school youth. The re:mix founder who is also a Josiah Project graduate, says “re:mix helps young people go further in with God and further out to spread Jesus' message of the Kingdom of God both locally and globally.” The re:mix conference is always offered alongside the New Wineskins conferences, and is also scheduled at other times and places.

One of these launches was Ambridge Youth Ignite (AYI), a holistic outreach to children and middle school youth in Rock the World's hometown of Ambridge, PA. AYI was created in 2004 by Josiah Project students Eric and Shea Rankin Geisbert who met while participating in Rock the World's Josiah Project. AYI's final program wrapped up in 2014. There have been many other programs launched this way, such as Three Nails, Pittsburgh Summer College Fellowship, Living Stones, and others.

Some programs that started within Rock the World have spun off to become their own ministries, such as inneracts. This same intentional process is occurring with Sonward and Good Shepherd Church.

Incubation of new ministries continues as trainees and graduates are inspired to pursue fresh initiatives. Please check Rock the World's website for current information.

== Other ministries ==
Rock the World also offers various retreats and weekend leadership training seminars, such as Striking Fire, a weekend training event, and Next Step, a retreat for middle school and high school kids themed on following Jesus. Rock the World also engages in various global initiatives, having consistent partnerships with All Nations Family and Anglican Global Mission Partners.

== Network ==
Rock the World’s trainees and graduates are spread out across most of the United States and several foreign countries, serving in churches, schools, businesses, and many other contexts. Aside from founder Whis Hays, Rock the World’s longest-serving employees have been (in order of longevity) Meredith B., Steven Tighe, Carol Jaros, and Cynthia Seeliger Seifert. Some graduates especially well known in student ministry circles include Holly Rankin Zaher, Aran Walter, Joel Tassie, Dixon Kinser, Dr. Steven Tighe and Dr. Jack Gabig. Other well-known graduates include Dr. Jacob Smith and Abram Kielsmeyer-Jones. Thousands of young people are touched by the ministries of Rock the World graduates, and hundreds decide to follow Jesus every year.
