= Church of St. Clement (El Paso, Texas) =

Anglican church in El Paso, Texas, United States

Coordinates: 31°45′56″N 106°29′19″W

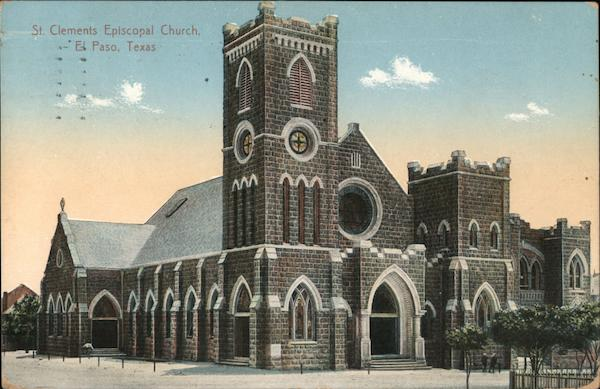
- St. Clement's Episcopal Church, El Paso, Texas, pictured in a 1910 postcard.
- Location: 810 North Campbell, El Paso, Texas
- Country: United States
- Denomination: Anglican Church in North America
- Website: stclements.com

History
- Founded: 1870
- Founder: The Rev. Joseph Wilkin Tays

Architecture
- Style: Gothic Revival

Administration
- Diocese: Diocese of the Southwest

Clergy
- Bishop: The Rt. Rev. Steven Tighe
- Rector: The Rev. William C. Cobb

The Church of St. Clement is a parish of the Anglican Diocese of the Southwest, located in the center of El Paso, Texas. Established in 1870 as the first Anglican/Episcopal church in El Paso, its current building dates to the early 20th century. The congregation left the Episcopal Church during the Anglican realignment while retaining its building and joined the Anglican Church in North America.

== History ==
=== Early days ===
St. Clement dates its origins to 1867, prior to El Paso's incorporation. A New York-born Episcopalian layman and young newspaper editor and lawyer, Gaylord J. Clarke and his wife moved to El Paso from Nebraska and hosted Episcopal Church prayer services in his parlor. Clarke befriended Albert Jennings Fountain, a future state senator and lieutenant governor of Texas, and together, Clarke and Fountain traveled to Austin to ask Alexander Gregg, the first bishop of Texas, to send a priest to the frontier town.

In 1870, Gregg sent the Rev. Joseph Wilkin Tays to establish an Episcopal mission in El Paso. He presided over El Paso's first Protestant services in a rented chapel on Oct. 9, 1870. The mission Church of St. Clement—named after Clarke's deceased son and after St. Clement of Rome―was the first Protestant church the Rio Grande Valley between Santa Fe, New Mexico, and Brownsville, Texas.

In December 1870, Clarke was fatally shot in El Paso by attorney Benjamin Williams after intervening in a gunfight between Williams and Fountain. Tays buried Clarke two months after the mission began holding services. Services ceased to be held and Tays left El Paso during the economic depression following the Panic of 1873. However, with the coming of the Southern Pacific; Texas and Pacific; and Atchison, Topeka and Santa Fe railroads to El Paso in 1881, the town began to grow and Tays returned. St. Clement completed a wood-frame building opposite present-day San Jacinto Plaza in 1882. Tays remained until dying of smallpox in 1884.

=== Expansion and growth ===
St. Clement received parish status in 1887 in the Diocese of West Texas and the Rev. George Higgins became the first rector. In 1890, the building was expanded with the addition of a belfry and chancel. St. Clement moved from the Diocese of West Texas to the Missionary District of New Mexico in 1895 when the Episcopal Church General Convention moved Texas' nine westernmost counties to the new jurisdiction. (The missionary district would eventually become the Diocese of the Rio Grande.)

In 1902, St. Clement began a longstanding practice of church planting and missionary outreach by providing pastoral support for the Episcopal church in Chihuahua, Mexico, under the second rector, the Rev. Mayo Cabell Martin.

The third rector, the Rev. George Easter, arranged for St. Clement's move to its current location in West Central El Paso, just north of downtown. The cornerstone of the current Gothic revival church was laid in 1907. Over the course of the 20th century, the church's campus was expanded to include two chapels, a parish hall and a parish school founded in 1958.

St. Clement's became one of the largest churches in the Diocese of the Rio Grande with more than 700 members. St. Clement's also contributed to the planting of the Episcopal churches of St. Anne's, St. Alban's, St. Christopher's, All Saints, and St. Francis on the Hill in El Paso. St. Clement was designated as a diocesan pro-cathedral in 1978.

=== Anglican realignment ===
In keeping with the conservative evangelical orientation of the diocese under Bishop Terence Kelshaw, St. Clement's members and leaders also became increasingly distant from the direction of the national Episcopal Church, in particular on issues like the authority of Scripture and doctrines on homosexuality. In the 1970s, St. Clement was a participant in Faith Alive and the charismatic renewal in the Episcopal Church. From 1998 to 2005, the church was led by the Rev. Philip Jones, who later became a bishop in the Anglican Mission in America.

In September 2007, under the leadership of the Rev. William C. Cobb, the congregation of St. Clement voted 460 to 41 to separate from the Episcopal Church and the Diocese of the Rio Grande. The church signed an agreement with Bishop Jeffrey Steenson to pay $2 million to the diocese to settle the Episcopal Church's claim to St. Clement's property under the Dennis Canon. Steenson noted in a letter to St. Clement members that the departure came "because of the acute sense of alienation from the recent decisions and direction of the Episcopal Church and because of the concern that this relationship is inhibiting the ability of St. Clement’s to do effective ministry in El Paso." St. Clement was one of five Rio Grande congregations to leave, including its church plant St. Francis, which joined the Church of Nigeria's Convocation of Anglicans in North America.

St. Clement joined the nascent Anglican Church in North America and became a founding member of the Diocese of the Southwest starting in 2011. In 2021, St. Clement's hosted the consecration of the Rt. Rev. Steven Tighe as the second diocesan bishop.

== Architecture ==
St. Clement's design is Gothic revival, with a cruciform floorplan oriented southwest–northeast along the nave axis and northwest–southeast along the transept. A bell tower stands on the west corner of the building. The church is faced with local Upham dolostone and the stones on the church include fossils of coral, snails and other marine life reflective of the Permian geology of the region.
