= St. James Anglican Church (Newport Beach) =

Anglican church in Costa Mesa, California

Saint James Anglican Church
- Saint James Anglican Church
- 33.67176°N 117.87679°W
- Location: 8101 Slater Ave., Huntington Beach, CA 92626
- Country: United States
- Denomination: Anglican Church in North America
- Website: stjamesnb.org

History
- Founded: 1941

Administration
- Diocese: Diocese of Western Anglicans

St. James Anglican Church is a parish church in Huntington Beach, California in the Diocese of Western Anglicans of the Anglican Church in North America. Since 2004, the church has received national attention over its legal case against the Episcopal Church, of which it was formerly a part, after withdrawing from it and joining another Anglican province.

== History ==
=== Episcopalian origins ===
St. James Episcopal Church was formed when the first Episcopal services were held in the Newport Harbor area, shortly after World War I. In 1941, the church was founded as a diocesan mission and in 1946 it was officially received as an Episcopal parish. Over the next three decades, the church grew and operated as an average Episcopal church. However, in 1974, the first charismatic Faith Alive service was held at St. James which was part of what is now known as the Convergence Movement. This eventually led to the three-pronged Sunday worship model, consisting of Rite I (traditional worship), Rite II (contemporary worship), and Charismatic, which continues to uniquely characterize St. James today.

Starting with the leadership of Fr. David Anderson in the 1990s, the church began to play an important role in the conservative wing of the Episcopal Church. In 1996, new administration, fellowship and education facilities were completed and in 2001, a new sanctuary was completed. In 2002, Anderson retired and currently serves as Rector Emeritus. He was succeeded by Rev. Praveen Bunyan in 2003.

=== Realignment and property disputes ===
Years of conflict over doctrinal and ideological differences with the Episcopal Church had led to a tense and frayed relationship. Under Bunyan's leadership, steps to disassociate with the Episcopal Church were initiated as a result of controversial decisions made at the General Convention in the summer of 2003, most notably, the confirmation of the first openly gay Episcopal bishop, Gene Robinson. In August 2004, this decision, along with other theological differences, led the rector, wardens, vestry and part of the congregation to vote overwhelmingly to disaffiliate with the Episcopal Church and to affiliate with the conservative Anglican Church of Uganda and form the new church called St. James Anglican Church. St. James was soon joined in secession by All Saints Church in Long Beach and St. David's Church in North Hollywood. All three churches were then sued for their property by the Episcopal Diocese of Los Angeles and the national Episcopal Church.

In January 2006, an Orange County Superior Court judge threw the lawsuit out, claiming that the Episcopal Church had no standing to bring their suit against St. James or the other two churches. However, in June 2007, a California appellate court reversed the decision. This led to St. James appealing the decision to the California Supreme Court, where it was widely believed that the church would win, since there was no precedent in California history for a denomination confiscating the property of a local church which held the deed. In April 2007, Bunyan resigned following allegations of inappropriate attention directed towards a female parishioner and was succeeded by an English native, the Rev. Richard Crocker, in November 2008.

In January 2009 the California Supreme Court ruled against St. James. The court stated that while the church held the deed to the multimillion-dollar property, because it was founded as an Episcopal Church, it could not take the property with it when it seceded. St. James Anglican Church was considering taking its case back to the trial court level and possibly an appeal to the U.S. Supreme Court.

In May 2013, Judge Kim G. Dunning reaffirmed her May 1 order to return the property to the Episcopal Diocese of Los Angeles.

Rick Warren, pastor of Saddleback Church, sent a letter to Christianity Today magazine offering the campus of his Lake Forest, California megachurch to St. James to use if they are forced to vacate their Newport Beach property. Rev. Crocker responded to Warren's offer with the following, "We are overwhelmed by his generosity. It is an encouraging sign of support from Christians in the community."
