= All Saints Anglican Cathedral (Long Beach) =

Anglican cathedral in Long Beach, California

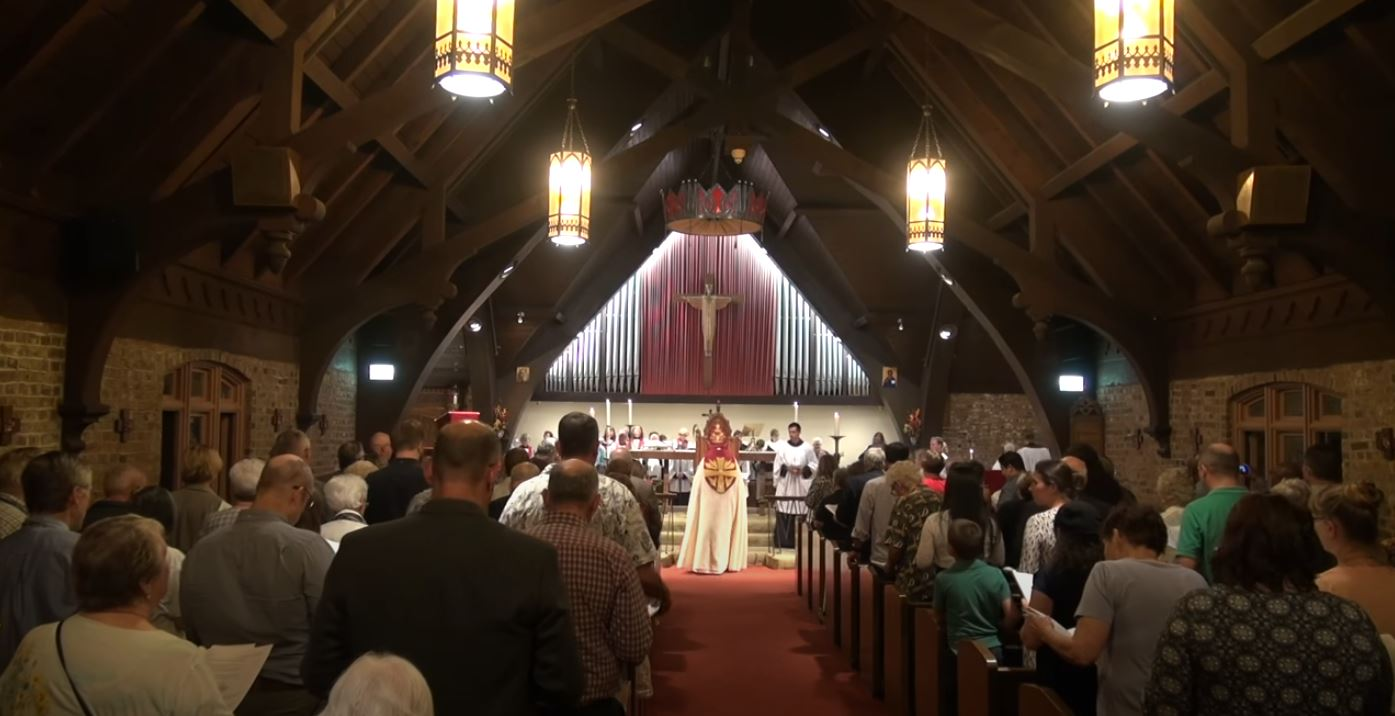
- The church's dedication service as a cathedral in January 2018.
- All Saints Anglican Cathedral
- Location: Long Beach, California
- Country: United States
- Denomination: Anglican Church in North America
- Website: www.allsaintslongbeach.com

History
- Founded: 1923
- Dedicated: 1929 (as parish church); 2017 (as cathedral)

Architecture
- Style: Tudor Revival

Administration
- Diocese: Western Anglicans

Clergy
- Bishop: The Rt. Rev. Phil Ashey
- Dean: The Very Rev. Scott Pedersen

All Saints Anglican Cathedral is an Anglican church in Long Beach, California. Founded in 1923 as All Saints Episcopal Church, it left the Episcopal Diocese of Los Angeles in 2004 as part of the Anglican realignment and joined the nascent Anglican Church in North America. In 2017, it was designated as the cathedral of the ACNA Diocese of Western Anglicans.

== History ==
=== Founding and growth ===
As Long Beach experienced population growth, All Saints was founded in 1923 as a mission of St. Luke's Episcopal Church in Long Beach. The first services of All Saints were held at Horace Mann Elementary School. In 1925, members of the parish purchased a site at Termino Avenue and East Colorado Street in Long Beach's Belmont Heights neighborhood, which is the church's current site. While funds were raised for construction, lay readers held services in a bungalow at the site.

The first rector of the parish was the Rev. F. Augustus Martyr, who served from 1928 through 1952. Services in the newly constructed Tudor Revival church began on September 22, 1929. After the Long Beach earthquake of 1933, the building was renovated to make it more seismically sound. Martyr's rectorate also saw the addition of the main altar and reredos.

After Martyr's long service, All Saints saw three rectors from 1952 to 1966. The Rev. Donald Behm was elected rector in 1966 and served until 1975. The mid-century period of the church saw the nave expanded to include north and south transepts and the altar placed at a central crossing. As All Saints grew, it became the church home for many of Long Beach's prominent citizens, such as future California Governor George Deukmejian, who was a member throughout his adult life and political career.

In 1966, the vestry recommended a young All Saints member, Bill Thompson, as a postulant for ordained ministry. After seminary, Thompson returned to All Saints in 1973 to serve as curate; in 1975, at the age of 28, he was elected to succeed Behm as the church's sixth rector.

Thompson served as rector until 2012, seeing the church grow to 400 in membership. During his years as rector, the church added a columbarium and a new preschool space. Under Thompson's leadership, All Saints became one of the most generous parishes in contributing to the Diocese of Los Angeles' Mission Share Fund.

=== Anglican realignment ===
All Saints was also known as a prominent evangelical and theologically conservative congregation in the Diocese of Los Angeles. The divide between the Episcopal Church and All Saints grew in 2003 with the election of Gene Robinson, a partnered gay man, as bishop of New Hampshire. In June 2004, Thompson led a conference of Anglican Communion Network members in southern California seeking alternative primatial oversight.

In August 2004, All Saints voted to disaffiliate from the Episcopal Church and seek episcopal oversight in the Church of Uganda's Diocese of Luwero. Thompson said that the Anglican churches of Africa “have intense passion and a strong commitment to uphold the true message of the Bible.” Joining All Saints was St. James Episcopal Church in Newport Beach and eventually two other congregations in the Diocese of Los Angeles. Los Angeles Bishop Jon Bruno responded by inhibiting Thompson and the other clergy and objecting to Henry Orombi, the primate of the Church of Uganda, that boundary-crossing by bishops "flies in the face of our ethos as Anglicans." In departing the Episcopal Church. All Saints renamed itself All Saints Anglican Church.

In September 2004, Bruno and the Diocese of Los Angeles sued the departing congregations to regain control of the property under the Episcopal Church's Dennis Canon. In November 2005, trial court judge David Velazquez ruled that the diocese had no claim on All Saints and another church property; he had already made a similar ruling in the separate St. James case. However, in January 2009, the California Supreme Court found for the diocese, ruling that "[a]pplying the neutral principles of law approach, we conclude that the general church, not the local church, owns the property in question. Although the deeds to the property have long been in the name of the local church, that church agreed from the beginning of its existence to be part of the greater church and to be bound by its governing documents." The case set California precedent for the subsequent litigation between the Episcopal Church and the Anglican Diocese of San Joaquin, which had also sought to secede and retain church properties.

After the conclusion of the litigation, Thompson and Bruno reached an agreement for All Saints to buy the church property from the diocese. As dean of the western convocation of the Anglican Communion Network, Thompson and All Saints were involved in the formation of the Anglican Church in North America. The western convocation was recognized as the Diocese of Western Anglicans, with All Saints as a founding member. As the leader of the western Anglican proto-diocese, Thompson was elected the first bishop of the newly approved diocese at ACNA's inaugural assembly in Bedford, Texas, in 2009. Archbishop Robert Duncan consecrated him in Newport Beach on October 31, 2009. In 2012, Thompson stepped down as rector of All Saints to focus solely on his diocesan work. He was succeeded by the Rev. Scott Pedersen as All Saints' seventh rector.

On October 27, 2017, All Saints was designated as the cathedral of the Diocese of Western Anglicans.

== Churchmanship ==
All Saints is known for combining high church liturgical worship with evangelical theology and charismatic spirituality. As is customary for Anglican cathedrals, All Saints offers daily morning or evening prayer services in St. Mary's Chapel according to the Daily Office and observes the Eucharist on designated feast days.

=== Programs ===
During Lent and Holy Week, All Saints regularly hosts an "immersive theatre" presentation of the death of Jesus Christ. The presentation, entitled “Good Friday At 5:15 PM,” recreates locales in Jerusalem on Good Friday, including Fortress Antonia, the crucifixion and descent from the cross. Performers reenact scenes using improvisation and answer questions as attendees pass through different vignettes.
