= Somerset, Pennsylvania =

Borough in Pennsylvania, US

- Borough
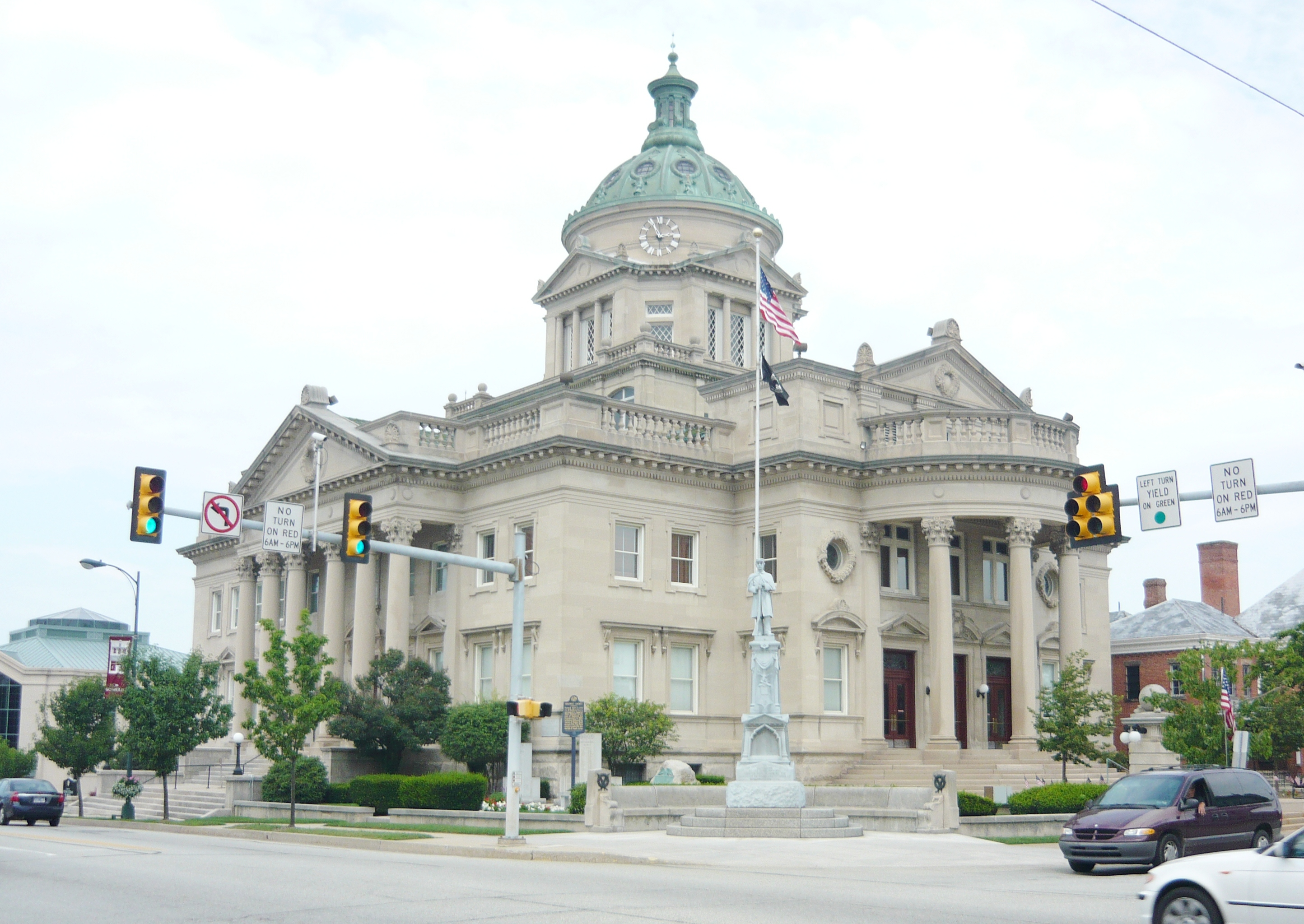
- Somerset County Courthouse

- Location of Somerset in Somerset County, Pennsylvania

- Location in Pennsylvania Location in the United States
- Coordinates: 40°00′25″N 79°04′53″W
- Country: United States
- State: Pennsylvania
- County: Somerset
- Settled: 1795
- Incorporated: March 5, 1804

Government
  - Type: Borough Council

Area
  - Total: 2.73 sq mi (7.07 km^{2})
  - Land: 2.73 sq mi (7.07 km^{2})
  - Water: 0 sq mi (0.00 km^{2})
- Elevation: 2,190 ft (670 m)

Population (2020)
  - Total: 6,048 ▼
  - Estimate (2021): 5,992
  - Density: 2,145.9/sq mi (828.52/km^{2})
- Time zone: UTC-5 (Eastern (EST))
  - Summer (DST): UTC-4 (EDT)
- Zip Code: 15501
- Area code: 814
- FIPS code: 42-71776
- Website: http://www.somersetborough.com

Somerset (/ˈsʌmərsɛt/ SUM-ər-set) is a borough in Somerset County, Pennsylvania, United States, and its county seat. The population was 6,046 at the 2020 census. The borough is surrounded by Somerset Township and is located off the Pennsylvania Turnpike (I-70 and I-76). Somerset is the principal city of the Somerset micropolitan statistical area, which consists of Somerset County, and is also a principal city of the larger Johnstown-Somerset combined statistical area.

== History ==
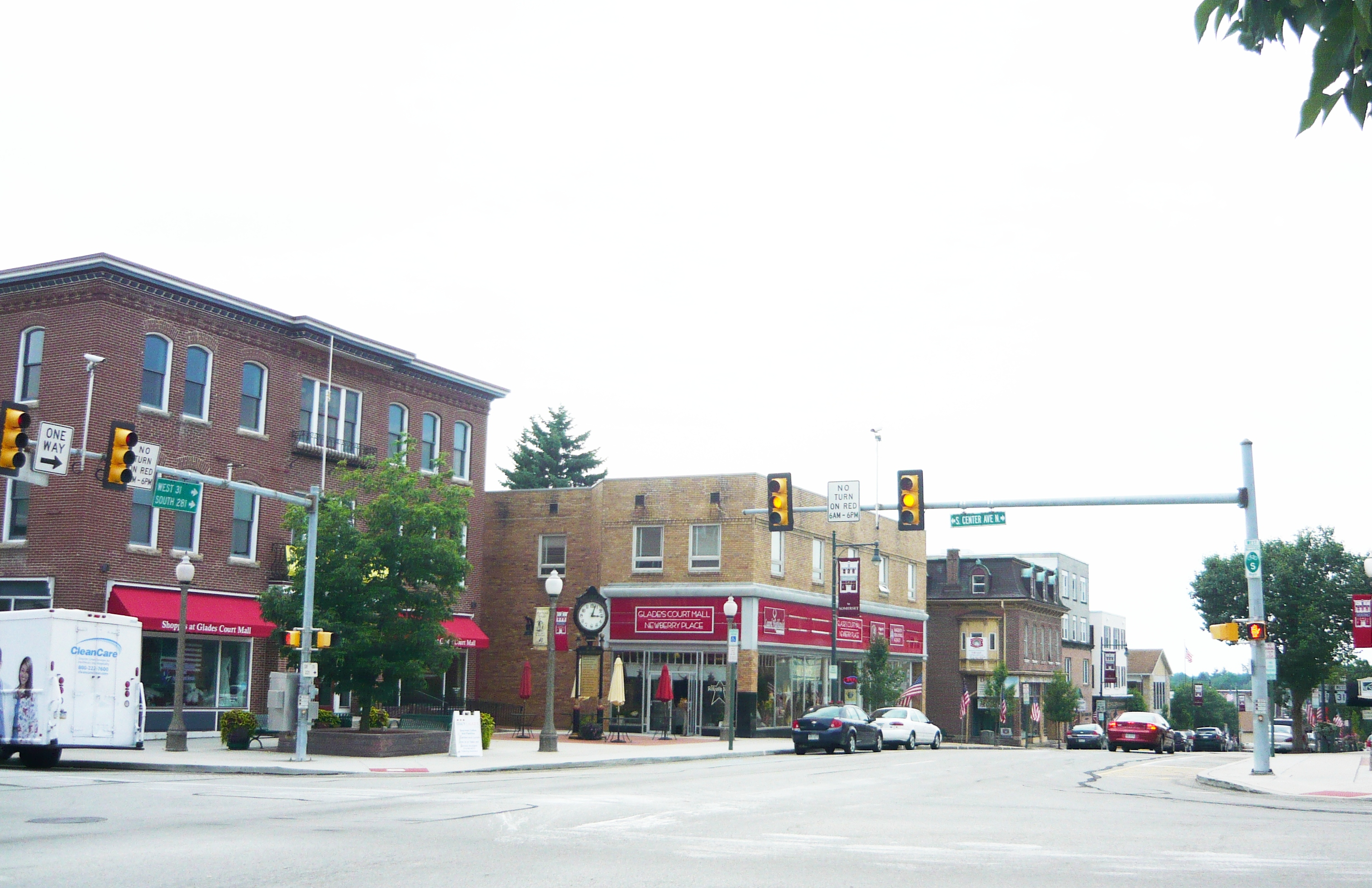
West Main Street

Somerset was a central stage for the Whiskey Rebellion of 1794. Several rebellion leaders, including Harmon Husband, lived in Somerset. The federal militia sent to put down the rebellion worked from its headquarters in the nearby town of Berlin.

A major fire on the afternoon of May 9, 1872, destroyed a significant portion of the town within just a few hours.

In July 2002, nine miners were trapped for 77 hours, 240 feet (73 m) underground, by flooding in the Quecreek coal mine, just outside Somerset. All nine miners were rescued. The Quecreek Mine Rescue was chronicled by journalists from around the world and was televised globally.

Somerset Crater on Mars was named after the borough in 2006.

The Somerset County Courthouse and Uptown Somerset Historic District are listed on the National Register of Historic Places.

== Geography ==
Somerset lies at 40°0′25″N 79°4′53″W (40.006920, -79.081297) on Pennsylvania's southern border.

According to the United States Census Bureau, the borough has a total area of 2.7 square miles (7.0 km^{2}), all land.

Somerset has the ninth-highest elevation of towns in Pennsylvania, at 2,190 feet (670 m) above sea level. Somerset County is in Appalachia.

=== Climate ===
Somerset has a humid continental climate that is affected by the high elevation, rendering it colder much of the winter than Altoona, Johnstown, or State College, despite being well south of these locations. Its climate is quite similar to those seen in northern Pennsylvania, although the average winter high temperatures are slightly higher. Somerset holds the June and November record low records for the state of Pennsylvania. Somerset is also the only place in Pennsylvania to receive accumulations of snow in June (other places received a partial dusting at most) when it received three inches of snow from the same polar front that caused it to drop to 20 degrees on June 10, 1913. Because of arctic air, powdery snow fell. It was photographed being swept off porches with brooms. That same cold snap brought snow to many other Pennsylvania communities, especially in the northern counties.

Climate data for Somerset, Pennsylvania
Month	Jan	Feb	Mar	Apr	May	Jun	Jul	Aug	Sep	Oct	Nov	Dec	Year
Record high °F (°C)	75 (24)	76 (24)	85 (29)	90 (32)	93 (34)	99 (37)	100 (38)	103 (39)	98 (37)	92 (33)	80 (27)	77 (25)	103 (39)
Mean daily maximum °F (°C)	31 (−1)	34 (1)	43 (6)	54 (12)	63 (17)	70 (21)	74 (23)	73 (23)	67 (19)	57 (14)	46 (8)	34 (1)	54 (12)
Mean daily minimum °F (°C)	14 (−10)	15 (−9)	22 (−6)	32 (0)	41 (5)	51 (11)	56 (13)	54 (12)	47 (8)	37 (3)	29 (−2)	20 (−7)	35 (2)
Record low °F (°C)	−33 (−36)	−29 (−34)	−20 (−29)	−3 (−19)	16 (−9)	20 (−7)	33 (1)	29 (−2)	22 (−6)	9 (−13)	−15 (−26)	−25 (−32)	−33 (−36)
Average precipitation inches (mm)	3.23 (82)	2.87 (73)	3.92 (100)	3.98 (101)	4.18 (106)	4.14 (105)	3.93 (100)	3.78 (96)	3.42 (87)	2.71 (69)	3.15 (80)	3.07 (78)	43.07 (1,094)
Average snowfall inches (cm)	26.8 (68)	21.2 (54)	14.2 (36)	3.5 (8.9)	0.5 (1.3)	0 (0)	0 (0)	0 (0)	0 (0)	1.1 (2.8)	5.5 (14)	20.1 (51)	92.9 (236)
Source: PA State Climatologist

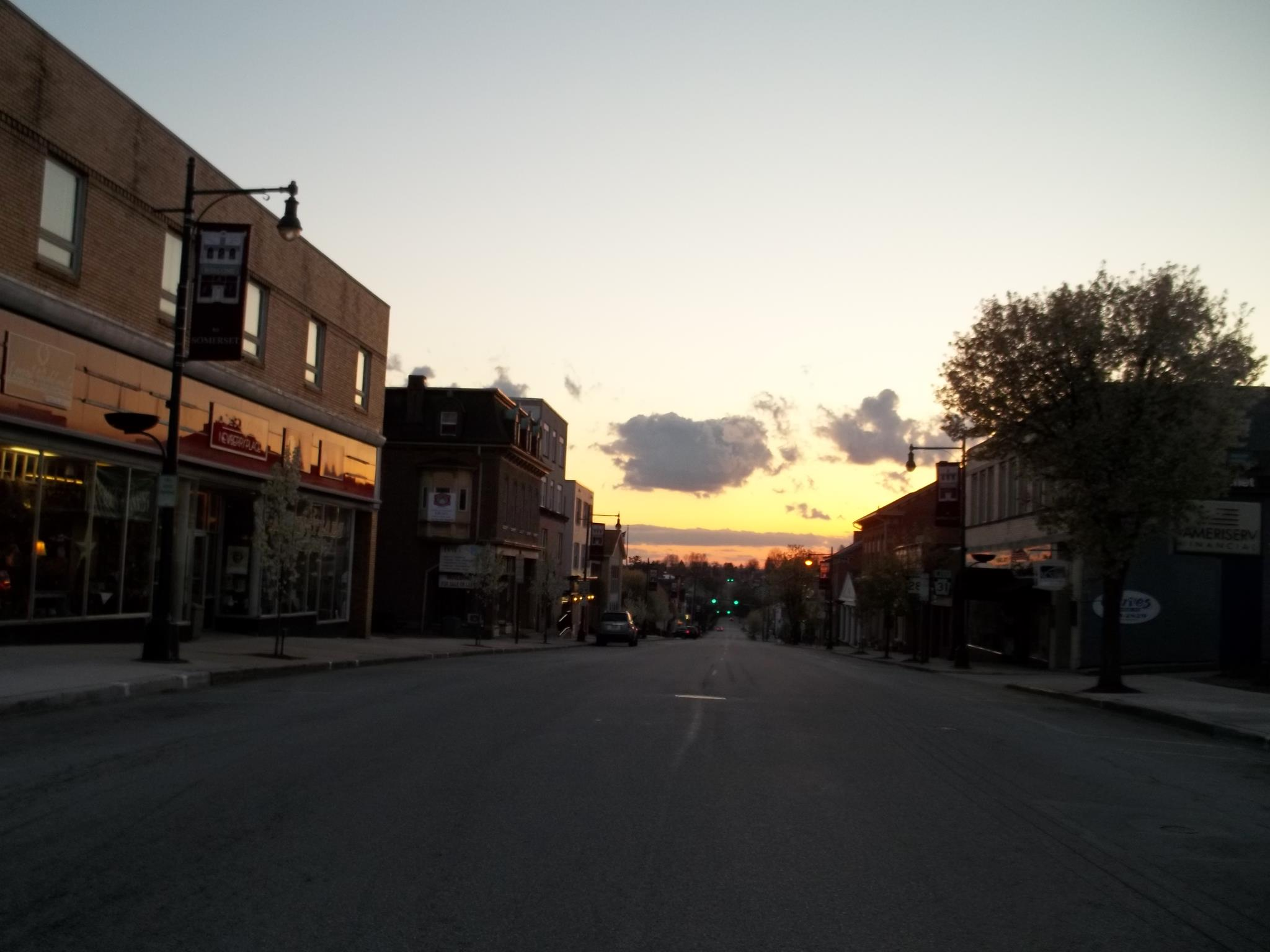
Easter Sunset From The Diamond

== Demographics ==
Historical population
Census	Pop.	Note	%±
1800	280		—
1810	489		74.6%
1820	442		−9.6%
1830	649		46.8%
1840	638		−1.7%
1850	866		35.7%
1860	1,001		15.6%
1870	945		−5.6%
1880	1,197		26.7%
1890	1,713		43.1%
1900	1,834		7.1%
1910	2,612		42.4%
1920	3,121		19.5%
1930	4,395		40.8%
1940	5,430		23.5%
1950	5,936		9.3%
1960	6,347		6.9%
1970	6,269		−1.2%
1980	6,474		3.3%
1990	6,454		−0.3%
2000	6,762		4.8%
2010	6,277		−7.2%
2020	6,048		−3.6%
2021 (est.)	5,992	▼	−0.9%

As of the census of 2000, there were 6,762 people, 3,035 households, and 1,717 families residing in the borough. The population density was 2,466.0 inhabitants per square mile (952.1/km^{2}). There were 3,313 housing units at an average density of 1,208.2 per square mile (466.5/km^{2}). The racial makeup of the borough was 97.80% White, 0.70% African American, 0.09% Native American, 0.70% Asian, 0.03% Pacific Islander, 0.19% from other races, and 0.50% from two or more races. Hispanic or Latino of any race were 0.55% of the population.

There were 3,035 households, out of which 26.4% had children under the age of 18 living with them, 40.5% were married couples living together, 12.6% had a female householder with no husband present, and 43.4% were non-families. 38.6% of all households were made up of individuals, and 17.6% had someone living alone who was 65 years of age or older. The average household size was 2.12 and the average family size was 2.82.

In the borough the population was spread out, with 21.9% under the age of 18, 8.5% from 18 to 24, 26.2% from 25 to 44, 21.9% from 45 to 64, and 21.4% who were 65 years of age or older. The median age was 40 years. For every 100 females there were 82.2 males. For every 100 females age 18 and over, there were 79.2 males.

The median income for a household in the borough was $29,050, and the median income for a family was $41,831. Males had a median income of $28,339 versus $19,492 for females. The per capita income for the borough was $18,310. About 7.8% of families and 11.6% of the population were below the poverty line, including 15.7% of those under age 18 and 5.6% of those age 65 or over.

== Economy ==
Somerset is headquarters to Drive DeVilbiss Healthcare, which manufactures oxygen concentrators and other medical equipment in a 152,000 square foot facility in Somerset.

== Education ==
The borough is served by the Somerset Area School District. There are three private schools, St. Peter School (K-8), Apostolic Christian Academy (K-12), and Somerset Christian School. Somerset Christian School is located at the Somerset Alliance Church. It offers classes for Pre-K - 12th grades.

== Media ==
Somerset is provided with local coverage from both the Johnstown and Pittsburgh markets. The Daily American newspaper serves the city and county.

== Notable people ==
- Jeremiah S. Black, Attorney General of the United States (1857–1860) and U.S. Secretary of State (1860–1861)
- Jacob M. Campbell (1821–1888), U.S. Congressman (1881–1887) and Civil War officer
- George Chorpenning (1820–1894), transportation pioneer
- Alexander Coffroth (1828–1906), U.S. Congressman during the Civil War
- Charles H. Ealy (1884–1947), president pro tempore of the Pennsylvania Senate (1941–1944)
- Henry K. Fluck (1912–1989), US Army major general
- Chauncey Forward (1793–1839), U.S. Congressman
- Keith Malley, co-host of the long-running podcast Keith and The Girl
- Alexander Ogle (1766–1832), U.S. Congressman
- Charles Ogle (1798–1841), Whig congressman and orator
- Edward Scull (1818–1900), U.S. Congressman
- Pete Zorn, musician and member of Richard Thompson's backing band
