= John Fenwick (bishop) =

Bishop of the Free Church of England

The Right Reverend John Fenwick D.D., Ph.D.
- Bishop Primus of the Free Church of England
- Coat of Arms
- Church: Free Church of England, Reformed Episcopal Church
- Diocese: Northern Diocese
- In office: 2006–2025
- Predecessor: John McLean

Orders
- Consecration: 29 July 2006

Personal details
- Born: John Fenwick
- Spouse: Elisabeth
- Education: University of Durham

Ordination history of John Fenwick
History
Episcopal consecration
- Consecrated by: John McLean (Free Church of England), Kenneth Powell (FCofE), Paul Hunt (FCofE), Royal Grote (Reformed Episcopal Church), Ray Sutton (REC), Cyril Mar Basilios (Malabar Independent Syrian Church), Joseph Mar Koorilose (MISC), and John McOwat (Moravian Church)

John Fenwick is a British bishop in the Anglican tradition. From 2006 to 2025, he was bishop primus of the Free Church of England. He holds degrees from the Universities of Durham, Nottingham and London. He has a commitment to traditional Anglicanism and Fenwick has played a significant role in the continuation of the Free Church of England, which adheres to the doctrines and practices of classical Anglicanism.

== Early life and education ==
He pursued his first degree in Zoology at the University of Durham. Fenwick later trained for ministry in the Church of England.

== Personal life ==
Fenwick is married to Elisabeth.

== Career ==
As a Church of England priest, Fenwick worked at Lambeth Palace as ecumenical secretary to two Archbishops of Canterbury, and co-secretary to the international Anglican-Orthodox dialogue.

Having served in the Church of England at the beginning of his career, Fenwick left the Established Church after general synod voted for holy orders to be open to women. Fenwick then joined the Free Church of England (otherwise called the Reformed Episcopal Church).

On 4 June 2025, Fenwick retired from his offices as Bishop Primus and Bishop of the Northern Diocese of the Free Church of England. Bishop Fenwick had been Bishop Primus, the senior bishop and representative leader of the denomination, as well as diocesan bishop for the Northern Diocese since 2006.

Upon his retirement, he was succeeded in both capacities by Bishop Paul Hunt, who assumed the roles of Bishop Primus and Bishop of the Northern and Southern Dioceses, respectively.

=== Legacy and impact ===
In early 1991, whilst assistant secretary of ecumenical affairs to the Archbishop of Canterbury, Fenwick contacted Arthur Ward, bishop of the Southern Diocese, regarding partnership between the established Church of England and the Free Church of England. This contact brought the Free Church of England to file with The London Gazette requesting application of the Sharing of Church Buildings Act 1969 to be a Designated Church. Consequently, on 28 January 1992, the Archbishops of Canterbury and York designated the Free Church of England as a church to which the Church of England (Ecumenical Relations) Measure 1988 applies.

== Works ==
Fenwick has authored several theology works including:

- Anglican Ecclesiology and the Gospel: The Renewing of a Vision Anglican House Media Ministry, Inc., Newport Beach, California., 2016.
- The Free Church of England: Introduction to an Evangelical Catholic Tradition Teneo Publishing House, Portugal.
