= Southern Diocese =

Southern Diocese may refer to:

- Southern Diocese, Anglican Episcopal Church of Brazil
- Southern Diocese, Evangelical-Lutheran Church in Hungary
- Diocese of Southern Karnataka of the Church of South India
- Southern Diocese, Evangelical Lutheran Church in Tanzania
- Southern Diocese (Free Church of England)
- Coptic Orthodox Diocese of the Southern United States
- Southern Diocese, Lutheran Church - International

== See also ==
- Diocese of the South (disambiguation)
