= Northern Diocese =

Northern Diocese may refer to:

- Northern Diocese, Evangelical-Lutheran Church in Hungary
- Diocese of Northern Mexico, Anglican Church of Mexico
- Diocese of Northern Nigeria, a former diocese of the Church of Nigeria
- Diocese of Northern Karnataka of the Church of South India
- Northern Diocese, Evangelical Lutheran Church in Southern Africa
- Northern Diocese, Evangelical Lutheran Church in Tanzania
- Northern Diocese (Free Church of England)
