= Free Church of England =

UK Christian denomination

- Classification: Protestant
- Orientation: Anglican
- Scripture: Christian Bible
- Theology: Low church Anglicanism
- Polity: Episcopal
- Associations: GAFCON; Churches Together in England; Free Church Federation
- Full communion: Reformed Episcopal Church
- Origin: 1844
- Separated from: Church of England
- Congregations: 18
- Official website: fcofe.org.uk

The Free Church of England (FCE) is an Episcopal Church based in England. The church was founded when a number of congregations separated from the established Church of England in the middle of the 19th century.

The doctrinal basis of the FCE, together with its Episcopal structures, organisation, worship, ministry and ethos are recognisably Anglican although it is not a member of the Anglican Communion. Its worship style follows that of the Book of Common Prayer or conservative modern-language forms that belong to the Anglican tradition.

The Church of England acknowledges the FCE as a church with valid orders and its canons permit a range of shared liturgical and ministerial activities.

== History ==
The Free Church of England was founded principally by Evangelical Low Church clergy and congregations in response to what were perceived as attempts (inspired by the Oxford Movement) to re-introduce traditional Catholic practices into the Church of England, England's established church. The first congregation was formed by the Reverend James Shore at St John's Church Bridgetown, Totnes, Devon, in 1844.

In the early years, clergy were often provided by the Countess of Huntingdon's Connexion which had its origins in the 18th-century Evangelical Revival. By the middle of the 19th century, the Connexion still retained many Anglican features such as the use of the surplice and the Book of Common Prayer.

The first Bishop was Benjamin Price, who initially had oversight of all the new congregations.

In 1874 the FCE made contact with the newly organised Reformed Episcopal Church in North America.

In 1956, the FCE published a revision of the Book of Common Prayer to form the primary text of the denomination's liturgy. The stated intention of the revision was to remove or explain "particular phrases and expressions" from the Church of England's 1662 edition of the prayer book that "afford at least plausible ground for the teaching and practice of the Sacerdotal and Romanising Party".

In 2003, due to differences in theology and practice, two Bishops and ten congregations split from the main Church and formed the Evangelical Connexion of the Free Church of England. Despite its name, the body is not part of the official denomination. Three of these congregations returned to the FCE – those in Exeter (which subsequently left the FCE again in April 2023), Middlesbrough (which eventually closed in 2021) and Oswaldtwistle. Leigh-on-Sea returned to the FCE in 2023. Two churches in Farnham and Teddington having become independent altogether, the ECFCE currently has four churches in Fleetwood, Leeds, Tuebrook (Liverpool) and Workington.

== Ordained ministry ==
The Church holds a threefold ministry of deacons, presbyters and bishops and only ordains men. Its orders have been recognised as valid by the Church of England since 2013.

== Organisation ==
The provision of contemporary language liturgies has been approved by Convocation and a process of drafting and authorisation has begun. The church has continued to ordain bishops in the apostolic succession, with Moravian, Church of England and Malabar Independent Syrian Church bishops taking part on occasion.

== Dioceses ==
The united Church enjoyed modest growth in the first part of the 20th century, having at one point 90 congregations, but after the Second World War, like most other denominations in the UK, suffered a decline in numbers, though there has been a modest increase in the number of congregations in recent years. The UK churches are located across two dioceses, the Northern Diocese and the Southern Diocese.

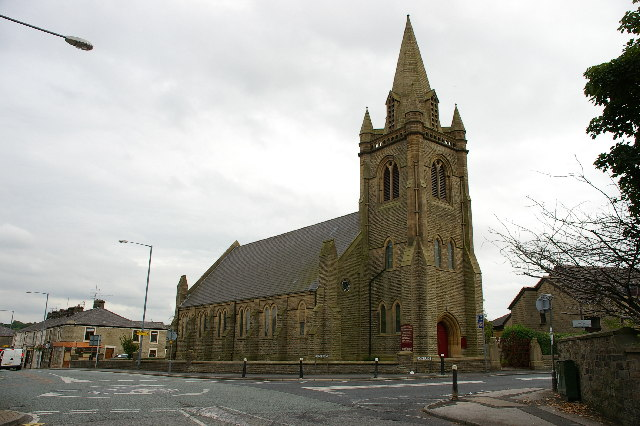
Holy Trinity Church Free Church of England, Oswaldtwistle

=== Northern Diocese ===
There is an Episcopal Vacancy in the Northern Diocese and the Rt Rev'd Matthew Firth was elected as an Assistant Bishop in 2025 to serve the Diocese.

Churches in the Northern Diocese are located in the northern half of England, alongside Wales, Scotland and the Isle of Man, with a majority of these congregations in the Lancashire area. These churches include a congregation which worships in Farsi.

=== Southern Diocese ===
The current Bishop of the Southern Diocese is the Rev'd Dr Paul Hunt, who also serves as Bishop Primus, an office that is elected annually at Convocation. The Assistant Bishop (elected in 2025) is the Rt Rev'd Dr Mark Gretason.

Churches in the Southern Diocese are located in the southern half of England.

== Recognition of orders ==
In January 2013 it was announced that the Church of England had recognised the holy orders of the Free Church of England. This move followed approximately three years of contact between the bishops of the Free Church of England, the Council for Christian Unity and the Faith and Order Commission. The recognition was approved by the Council for Christian Unity and the Faith and Order Advisory Commission, and endorsed by the standing committee of the House of Bishops. John McLean, the then Bishop Primus of the Free Church of England, said: "We are grateful to the archbishops for this recognition of our common episcopal heritage. I pray that it will not be an end in itself, but will lead to new opportunities for proclaiming the Gospel." Christopher Hill, Bishop of Guildford and chair of the Church of England's Council for Christian Unity, said: "I hope there will be good relations between us and especially in those places where there is a Free Church of England congregation."

Recognition of the orders of the Free Church of England under the Overseas and Other Clergy (Ministry and Ordination) Measure 1967 (No. 3) means that FCE clergy are eligible to be given permission under that measure to officiate in the Church of England, subject to such procedures and authorisations as may be required. A number have been so authorised while remaining clergy of the FCE in good standing. The measure also permits FCE bishops to ordain and perform other episcopal functions at the request of the bishop of a diocese in the provinces of Canterbury and York, subject to the consent of the relevant archbishop.

== Relationships ==
The FCE is in communion with the Reformed Episcopal Church, which itself is now a subjurisdiction of the Anglican Church in North America. Within the UK the FCE is a member of the Free Churches Group and Churches Together in England. From 1992 to 1997 the FCE was in official dialogue with the Church of England, which the 1998 Lambeth Conference saw as a sign of hope. It is a Designated Church under the Church of England's Ecumenical Relations Measure 1988.

FCE bishops have attended the enthronements of George Carey, Rowan Williams and Justin Welby as Archbishops of Canterbury. Since 2013, the Free Church of England has been in dialogue with the conservative Old Catholics of the Union of Scranton; former FCE Deacon Calvin Robinson sought ordination in the Union of Scranton's Nordic Catholic Church while minister-in-charge at the FCE's Christ Church, Harlesden.

== Anglican realignment ==
The FCE has been involved in the realignments within the Anglican Communion. In 2009 the church was represented at the launch of the Fellowship of Confessing Anglicans (UK and Ireland), the local expression of the Global Anglican Future Conference (GAFCON) movement inaugurated the previous year in Jerusalem. The FCE has been represented at the subsequent GAFCON Conferences – Nairobi (2013), Jerusalem (2018) and Kigali (2023). Its bishops are members of the GAFCON GBE Bishops’ Forum and the Bishop Primus is a member of the GAFCON GBE Regional Council.

In February 2016, Foley Beach, Archbishop of the Anglican Church in North America, signed an Instrument declaring the Anglican Church in North America to be in full communion with the Free Church of England, and recognising "their congregations, clergy, and sacraments, while pledging to work together for the proclamation of the Good News of Jesus Christ and the making of his disciples throughout the world". Archbishop Beach's declaration was ratified by the provincial council of the ACNA in June 2016.
