= St John's Church, Bridgetown =

Church in Bridgetown, Devon, England

Coordinates: 50.4301°N 3.6790°W

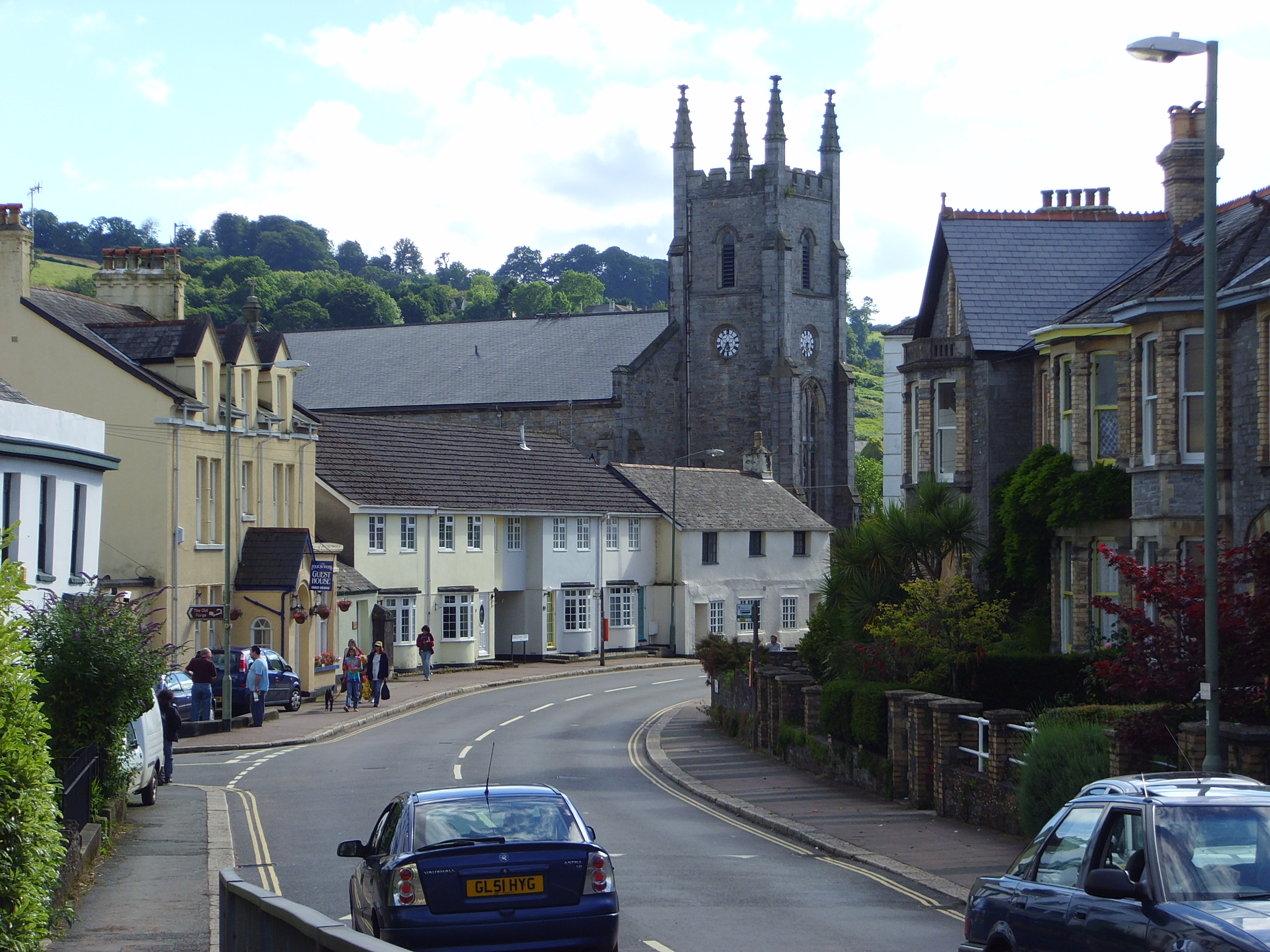
St John's Church, Bridgetown, 2008

St John's Church, Bridgetown is a Church of England place of worship built in 1832 by Edward St Maur, 11th Duke of Somerset for the tenants of his estate in Bridgetown, Devon. The original church was gutted by fire on 9 July 1976 owing to arson. The church was rebuilt and reconsecrated by Eric Mercer, the Bishop of Exeter in 1980. It is a Grade II listed building.

When the church was built Edward St Maur contacted Henry Philpotts, the Bishop of Exeter as regards the consecration of the church. After a meeting and extensive correspondence between the Duke's solicitor and the Bishop's secretary it was resolved to make the church a chapel of ease attached to St Mary's Church, Berry Pomeroy.

From 1843 until 1869 the church was aligned with the Free Church of England.
