= Northern Diocese (Free Church of England) =

Reformed Episcopal church in the United Kingdom

The Northern Diocese of the Free Church of England, is a Free Church of England and a Reformed Episcopal Church diocese which covers the northern portion of the British Isles. The Southern Diocese covers the southern half of England.

== Bishops ==
- –1917: William Troughton
- 1927–1958: Frank Vaughan
- 1958–1967: Thomas Cameron
- 1967–1973: James Burrell
- 1973–1998: Cyril Milner
- 1999–2003: Arthur Bentley-Taylor
- 2003–2006: John McLean
- 2006–2025: John Fenwick
- 2025-Present: Matthew Firth Assistant Bishop

== Churches ==
Church	Location	Founded	Link	Minister	Notes
St George, Mill Hill	Blackburn, Lancashire	1907		Anthony Walsh	
Emmanuel, Morecambe	Morecambe, Lancashire	1886		Vacant	The Church building is current irregularly occupied by a congregation that dissented from the Free Church of England.
Holy Trinity, Oswaldtwistle	Oswaldtwistle, Lancashire	1870		Anthony Ford	
St John, Tottington	Tottington, Greater Manchester	1853		Vacant	
Christ Church, Liscard	Liscard, Merseyside	1880		Stephen Taylor	
St Barnabas, Isle of Man	Douglas, Isle of Man	2016		Werner Alberts	Joined FCE 2020. Meets in Jim Crosbie Memorial Hall, Derby Road, Douglas. IM2 3EN
St Abdias of Susa, Sheffield	Sheffield	2022		Karim Novi	Services in Farsi
York Anglican Church	York, Yorkshire	2023		Matthew Firth	

=== Associate Congregations ===
Church	Location	Founded	Link	Minister	Notes
Good Shepherd and St Tudwal	North Wales			Gareth Parry, Ronald Evans	
St Alban the Martyr	Salford			Charles Johnson	

=== Cells ===
Church	Location	Founded	Link	Minister	Notes
Community of St Monan	St Andrews	2024		Aaron Pelot, Samuel Ivey	
