= Benjamin Price (bishop) =

Religious leader

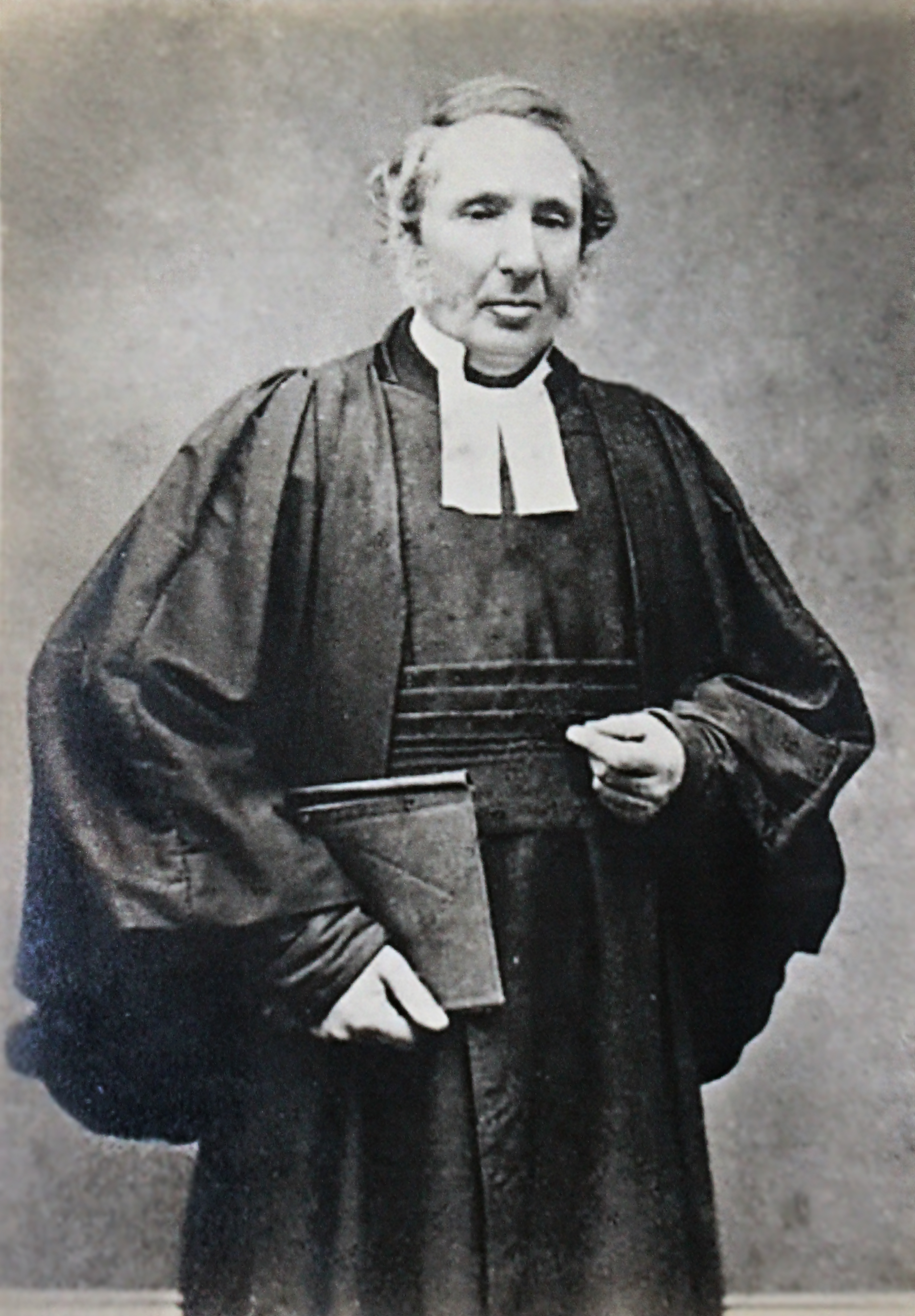
The Right Reverend Benjamin Price, first Bishop and Primus of The Free Church of England. Elected in 1868 and consecrated in 1876.

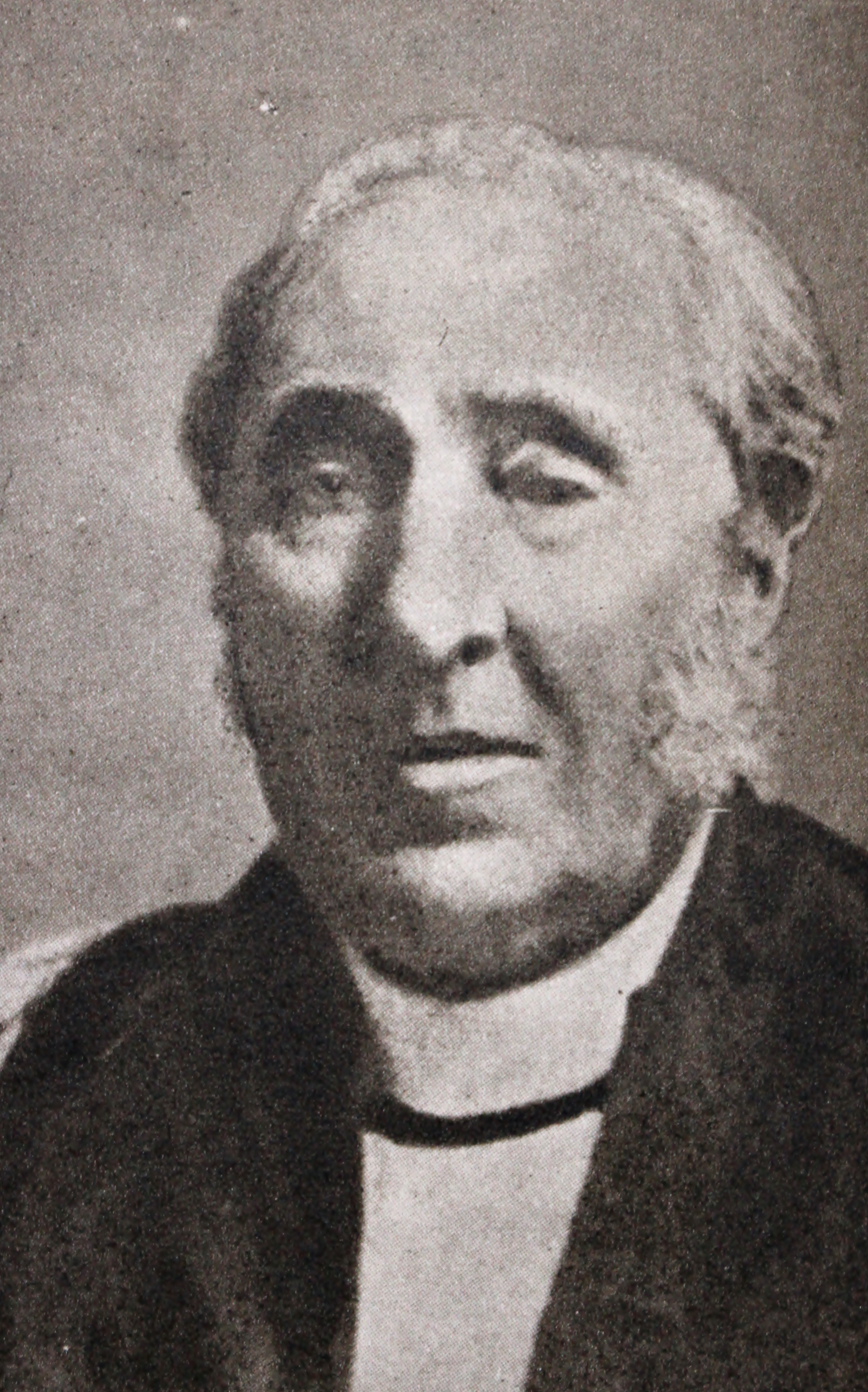
The Right Reverend Benjamin Price, consecrated in 1876.

Benjamin Price (1804-1896) was the first bishop of the Free Church of England.

Born in 1804 at Llanllywenfel (Llanlleon-vel), in the Buellt district of Brecon, the son of Isaac Price, a shopkeeper and prominent Calvinistic Methodist elder. He was a great nephew of David Price, vicar of Llanbadarn Fawr, Ceredigion, and a cousin of the Orientalist David Price.

It appears that Price began to preach among the Calvinistic Methodists. There is a report of him preaching with John Elias, at Newtown in 1830. It seems that he was not fluent in the Welsh language, which may be the reason for him transferring to Lady Huntingdon’s Connexion. In 1844, some Anglican clergyman in the south-west of England, reacting against the Tractarian movement, founded the Free Church of England. Soon afterwards, in 1845, Price became the Free Church of England’s minister at Ilfracombe. The Connexion and the FCE assembled in united conference under one president. Price was the President for a number of years. Although he had not been consecrated at that time, in 1868 Price was awarded the title of Bishop. He was elected President of Convocation in 1866. In 1876, Bishop Edward Cridge of British Columbia in the Reformed Episcopal Church came over, and formally consecrated Price.

Price died at Ilfracombe, 6 January 1896, aged 91.
