= List of acts of the 3rd session of the 44th Parliament of the United Kingdom =

This is a list of acts of the 3rd session of the 44th Parliament of the United Kingdom, which ran from 30 October 1968 until 22 October 1969.

Acts passed since 1963 are cited by calendar year, as opposed to the convention used for earlier acts of citing the regnal year(s) in which the relevant parliamentary session was held. Each act passed in a respective year is given a chapter number (abbreviated "c."), denoted by Arabic numerals in the case of public general acts, lowercase Roman numerals in the case of local acts, or italicised Arabic numerals in the case of personal acts. These run as separate series.

125 acts of Parliament were passed by the 44th Parliament in its 3rd session: 63 public general acts and 62 local acts.

indicates that an act is available to view at legislation.gov.uk, and indicates the location of the original act in the Parliamentary Archives.

== Public general acts ==
{{legislationuk|act |- | {{|Customs (Import Deposits) Act 1968|public|74|05-12-1968|maintained=y|An Act to grant a new duty of customs repayable after a specified period.}} |- | {{|Miscellaneous Financial Provisions Act 1968|public|75|18-12-1968|maintained=y|An Act to provide for increasing the capital of the Civil Contingencies Fund; to provide for making payments to the Governments of Northern Ireland and the Isle of Man in respect of revenue from the continental shelf; and to enable the Industrial Reorganisation Corporation to borrow in currencies other than sterling.}} |- | {{|Expiring Laws Continuance Act 1968|public|76|18-12-1968|maintained=y|An Act to continue certain expiring laws.}} |- | {{|Sea Fisheries Act 1968|public|77|18-12-1968|maintained=y|An Act to make further provision with respect to the subsidies payable to, and the levies which may be imposed on, the white fish and herring industries, to make further provision for the regulation of sea fishing, to amend the Sea Fisheries (Shellfish) Act 1967 and the Sea Fish (Conservation) Act 1967, to make provision with respect to fishing boats and gear lost or abandoned at sea, to remove anomalies in certain enactments relating to sea fisheries and the white fish and herring industries and to repeal other such enactments which are obsolete or unnecessary; and for connected purposes.}} |- | {{|Electricity (Scotland) Act 1969|public|1|30-01-1969|An Act to increase the statutory limits imposed on the amounts outstanding in respect of borrowings by the Scottish Electricity Boards and to amend the law with respect to the authentication of the seals of the said Boards.}} |- | {{|Local Government Grants (Social Need) Act 1969|public|2|30-01-1969|maintained=y|An Act to authorise the payment to local authorities in Great Britain of grants towards expenditure incurred by reason of special social need in urban areas.}} |- | {{|Consolidated Fund Act 1969|public|3|12-02-1969|An Act to apply a sum out of the Consolidated Fund to the service of the year ending on 31st March 1969.}} |- | {{|National Insurance &c. Act 1969|public|4|06-03-1969|An Act to postpone the coming into force of the provision made by section 3(1) of the National Insurance Act 1966 with respect to the entitlement of suspended workers to unemployment benefit; and to make further provision with respect to periods of limitation governing the payment of benefit under the enactments relating to social security.}} |- | {{|New Towns Act 1969|public|5|06-03-1969|An Act to raise the limit on advances imposed by section 43 of the New Towns Act 1965, as amended by subsequent enactments.}} |- | {{|Shipbuilding Industry Act 1969|public|6|06-03-1969|An Act to amend section 7 of the Shipbuilding Industry Act 1967 by increasing the amount up to which the Minister of Technology may assume liability by giving guarantees under the section.}} |- | {{|Pensions (Increase) Act 1969|public|7|06-03-1969|An Act to provide for increases or supplements in respect of certain pensions.}} |- | {{|Redundancy Rebates Act 1969|public|8|06-03-1969|An Act to reduce the rebates payable under section 30 of the Redundancy Payments Act 1965.}} |- | {{|Consolidated Fund (No. 2) Act 1969|public|9|27-03-1969|An Act to apply certain sums out of the Consolidated Fund to the service of the years ending on 31st March 1968, 1969 and 1970.}} |- | {{|Mines and Quarries (Tips) Act 1969|public|10|27-03-1969|maintained=y|An Act to make further provision in relation to tips associated with mines and quarries; to prevent disused tips constituting a danger to members of the public; and for purposes connected with those matters.}} |- | {{|National Theatre Act 1969|public|11|27-03-1969|An Act to raise the limit imposed by section 1 of the National Theatre Act 1949 on the contributions which may be made under that section.}} |- | {{|Genocide Act 1969|public|12|27-03-1969|maintained=y|An Act to give effect to the Convention on the Prevention and Punishment of the Crime of Genocide.}} |- | {{|Licensing (Scotland) Act 1969|public|13|27-03-1969|An Act to amend the Licensing (Scotland) Act 1959 so as to make provision for the establishment of licensing courts for new small burghs formed under section 133 of the Local Government (Scotland) Act 1947; and for purposes connected therewith.}} |- | {{|Horserace Betting Levy Act 1969|public|14|27-03-1969|maintained=y|An Act to make further provision with respect to the contributions to be made, under Part I of the Betting, Gaming and Lotteries Act 1963, by bookmakers and the Totalisator Board to the Horserace Betting Levy Board; and to amend section 24 of the said Act of 1963 with respect to the appointment and removal of members of the last-mentioned Board.}} |- | {{|Representation of the People Act 1969|public|15|17-04-1969|An Act to amend the law about the qualification of electors at elections to the Parliament of the United Kingdom or at local government elections in Great Britain, and the qualification for election to and membership of local authorities in England and Wales, about the conduct of and manner of voting at those elections and about candidates' election expenses thereat, and otherwise to make provision about matters incidental to those elections, and for purposes connected therewith.}} |- | {{|Customs Duties (Dumping and Subsidies) Act 1969|public|16|24-04-1969|maintained=y|An Act to consolidate the Customs Duties (Dumping and Subsidies) Acts 1957 and 1968 and related enactments.}} |- | {{|Betting, Gaming and Lotteries (Amendment) Act 1969|public|17|16-05-1969|maintained=y|An Act to amend the provisions of the Betting, Gaming and Lotteries Act 1963 in relation to the maximum percentage which may be deducted by the operator from amounts staked on the totalisator.}} |- | {{|Nuclear Installations Act 1969|public|18|16-05-1969|maintained=y|An Act to make in the Nuclear Installations Act 1965 certain amendments necessary to bring that Act into conformity with international agreements.}} |- | {{|Decimal Currency Act 1969|public|19|16-05-1969|maintained=y|An Act to make further provision in connection with the introduction of a decimal currency, and to impose restrictions on the melting or breaking of metal coins.}} |- | {{|Foreign Compensation Act 1969|public|20|16-05-1969|maintained=y|An Act to make provision with respect to certain property (including the proceeds thereof and any income or other property accruing therefrom) of persons formerly resident or carrying on business in Estonia, Latvia, Lithuania or a part of Czechoslovakia, Finland, Poland or Rumania which has been ceded to the Union of Soviet Socialist Republics, and to amend the Foreign Compensation Act 1950.}} |- | {{|Immigration Appeals Act 1969|public|21|16-05-1969|maintained=y|An Act to confer rights of appeal against the exercise by the Secretary of State and officers acting under his instructions of their powers in respect of the admission into and removal from the United Kingdom of persons to whom section 1 or 6 of the Commonwealth Immigrants Act 1962 applies, and to enable provision to be made by Order in Council for conferring corresponding rights of appeal on aliens; to enable deportation orders to be made without the recommendation of a court in the case of persons to whom the said section 6 applies who fail to comply with conditions subject to which they have been admitted into the United Kingdom; to make provision as respects the holding of entry certificates by certain persons to whom the said section 1 applies who seek admission into the United Kingdom; to make the owners or agents of ships and aircraft liable for certain expenses incurred in respect of persons to whom the said section 1 applies who are directed to be removed from the United Kingdom; and for purposes connected with the matters aforesaid.}} |- | {{|Redundant Churches and other Religious Buildings Act 1969|public|22|16-05-1969|maintained=y|An Act to authorise the making of grants to the Redundant Churches Fund; to exclude section 40 of the Town and Country Planning Act 1968 in relation to the demolition, in certain cases, of redundant places of public worship; to provide for, and make provision in connection with, the transfer to the Minister of Housing and Local Government or the Secretary of State of certain such places; and to make other provision relating to the acquisition and maintenance by that Minister and the Secretary of State of redundant churches and other religious buildings.}} |- | {{|Army Reserve Act 1969|public|23|16-05-1969|An Act to extend the period during which certain national servicemen or national service volunteers are liable to serve in the army reserve.}} |- | {{|Tattooing of Minors Act 1969|public|24|16-05-1969|maintained=y|An Act to prohibit the tattooing of persons under the age of eighteen years.}} |- | {{|Public Health (Recurring Nuisances) Act 1969|public|25|25-06-1969|An Act to enable local authorities to deal more effectively with recurring nuisances.}} |- | {{|Agriculture (Spring Traps) (Scotland) Act 1969|public|26|25-06-1969|An Act to make provision with respect to the termination of the power to authorise by order under section 50(4) of the Agriculture (Scotland) Act 1948 the use of spring traps other than approved traps in Scotland.}} |- | {{|Vehicle and Driving Licences Act 1969|public|27|25-06-1969|maintained=y|An Act to make further provision, in relation to mechanically propelled vehicles, about the licensing, registration and marking of vehicles, the payment of excise duty, the licensing of drivers, offences and the provision of copies of test certificates; and for purposes connected with those matters.}} |- | {{|Ponies Act 1969|public|28|25-06-1969|An Act to improve the conditions under which ponies are exported; to prohibit or restrict the export of certain ponies; and for purposes connected therewith.}} |- | {{|Tanzania Act 1969|public|29|25-06-1969|maintained=y|An Act to make provision for modifying the law in consequence of the union of Tanganyika and Zanzibar to form the United Republic of Tanganyika and Zanzibar as a republic within the Commonwealth and the subsequent adoption by that republic of the name of Tanzania; to make provision as to the operation of the Colonial and Other Territories (Divorce Jurisdiction) Acts 1926 to 1950 in relation to the courts of Tanganyika and of the united republic; and for purposes connected therewith.}} |- | {{|Town and Country Planning (Scotland) Act 1969|public|30|25-06-1969|maintained=y|An Act to amend the law of Scotland relating to town and country planning, the compulsory acquisition of land and the disposal of land by public authorities; to make provision for Planning Inquiry Commissions; to make provision for grants for research relating to, and education with respect to, the planning and design of the physical environment; to extend the purposes for which Exchequer contributions may be made under the Housing and Town Development (Scotland) Act 1957; and for connected purposes.}} |- | {{|Appropriation Act 1969|public|31|25-07-1969|An Act to apply a sum out of the Consolidated Fund to the service of the year ending on 31st March 1970, and to appropriate the supplies granted in this Session of Parliament.}} |- | {{|Finance Act 1969|public|32|25-07-1969|maintained=y|An Act to grant certain duties, to alter other duties, and to amend the law relating to the National Debt and the Public Revenue, and to make further provision in connection with Finance.}} |- | {{|Housing Act 1969|public|33|25-07-1969|maintained=y|An Act to make further provision for grants by local authorities and contributions out of moneys provided by Parliament towards the cost of providing dwellings by conversion or of improving dwellings and houses; to confer powers on local authorities to improve living conditions by improving the amenities of areas or of dwellings therein; to amend the law with regard to rents payable for certain dwellings in good repair and provided with certain amenities or improved with the assistance of local authorities; to make further provision with regard to houses in multiple occupation; to make further provision for payments in respect of unfit houses subject to compulsory purchase, clearance, demolition or closing orders; to alter the legal standard of fitness for human habitation and confer additional powers on local authorities to require the repair of houses; to amend the law relating to long tenancies and modify section 9(1) of the Leasehold Reform Act 1967; to amend Part II of the Housing Subsidies Act 1967; to amend section 46 of the Rent Act 1968; to increase the fine which may be imposed under section 170 of the Housing Act 1957; and for purposes connected with those matters.}} |- | {{|Housing (Scotland) Act 1969|public|34|25-07-1969|An Act to prescribe a tolerable standard for houses and to make provision for the treatment of houses and areas, and for payments in respect of houses purchased or vacated, which do not meet that standard; to make new provision with respect to the repair of houses; to make further provision for grants by local authorities and contributions out of moneys provided by Parliament towards the cost of providing dwellings by conversion, or of improving dwellings; to amend the law with regard to rents payable for certain dwellings in good repair and provided with certain amenities or improved; to confer powers on local authorities in respect of the improvement of the amenities of residential areas; to provide that the replacement by a tenant of fixtures and fittings is to be disregarded in determining a fair rent under a regulated tenancy; to provide for the increase of rents of houses belonging to certain authorities without notice of removal; to amend section 160(1)(a) of the Housing (Scotland) Act 1966; to amend the meaning of "financial year" for the purposes of subsections (2) and (3) of section 2 of the Housing (Financial Provisions) (Scotland) Act 1968; and for purposes connected with those matters.}} |- | {{|Transport (London) Act 1969|public|35|25-07-1969|maintained=y|An Act to make provision with respect to transport in and around Greater London and for connected purposes.}} |- | {{|Overseas Resources Development Act 1969|public|36|25-07-1969|An Act to raise the limits imposed by the Overseas Resources Development Act 1959 on borrowings by the Commonwealth Development Corporation and on advances to the Corporation by the Minister of Overseas Development; to extend the area of operation of the Corporation; and for purposes connected with those matters.}} |- | {{|Employer's Liability (Defective Equipment) Act 1969|public|37|25-07-1969|maintained=y|An Act to make further provision with respect to the liability of an employer for injury to his employee which is attributable to any defect in equipment provided by the employer for the purposes of the employer's business; and for purposes connected with the matter aforesaid.}} |- | {{|Sharing of Church Buildings Act 1969|public|38|25-07-1969|maintained=y|An Act to provide for the sharing and using of church buildings by different Churches and for matters connected therewith.}} |- | {{|Age of Majority (Scotland) Act 1969|public|39|25-07-1969|maintained=y|An Act to amend the law of Scotland relating to the age of majority; and for connected purposes.}} |- | {{|Medical Act 1969|public|40|25-07-1969|An Act to amend the Medical Act 1956, and for connected purposes.}} |- | {{|National Mod (Scotland) Act 1969|public|41|25-07-1969|An Act to make further provision for contributions by local authorities in Scotland towards the expenses of the National Mod.}} |- | {{|Architects Registration (Amendment) Act 1969|public|42|25-07-1969|maintained=y|An Act to amend section 14 of the Architects (Registration) Act 1931; to vary from time to time the proportion of the income of the Architects' Registration Council of the United Kingdom which has to be put into the fund maintained by the Council for the support of needy students of architecture; to widen the purposes of the fund; and for purposes connected therewith.}} |- | {{|Air Corporations Act 1969|public|43|25-07-1969|maintained=y|An Act to make new provision in relation to the finances of the British European Airways Corporation; and to amend the provisions of the Air Corporations Act 1967 relating to members of the corporations in order to prevent conflicts of interest.}} |- | {{|National Insurance Act 1969|public|44|25-07-1969|An Act to amend the provisions of the National Insurance Act 1965, the National Insurance (Industrial Injuries) Act 1965 and the Industrial Injuries and Diseases (Old Cases) Act 1967 as to the rate or amount of contributions and benefit; to make further provision as to death grant under the National Insurance Act 1965, as to the assessment of disablement under the National Insurance (Industrial Injuries) Act 1965 and, for purposes of those and certain other Acts, as to the introduction of a decimal currency; to make temporary provision consequential on or related to the matters aforesaid; and for other purposes connected therewith.}} |- | {{|Iron and Steel Act 1969|public|45|25-07-1969|An Act to make new provision in relation to the finances of the British Steel Corporation and certain of their subsidiaries; to empower the Minister of Power to vest property, rights, liabilities or obligations of certain of that Corporation's subsidiaries in them and dissolve certain of their subsidiaries and, in that connection, to amend section 41 of the Iron and Steel Act 1949; to amend the enactments relating to corporation tax in their application, in certain circumstances, to that Corporation; to empower the Board of Trade to make to that Corporation grants comparable to certain of those that may be made under the Industrial Development Act 1966 and the Ministry of Commerce for Northern Ireland to make to them grants comparable to certain of those that may be made under the Industrial Investment (General Assistance) Act (Northern Ireland) 1966; to alter that Corporation's financial year; and to make new provision with respect to the authentication of the fixing of their seal.}} |- | {{|Family Law Reform Act 1969|public|46|25-07-1969|maintained=y|An Act to amend the law relating to the age of majority, to persons who have not attained that age and to the time when a particular age is attained; to amend the law relating to the property rights of illegitimate children and of other persons whose relationship is traced through an illegitimate link; to make provision for the use of blood tests for the purpose of determining the paternity of any person in civil proceedings; to make provision with respect to the evidence required to rebut a presumption of legitimacy and illegitimacy; to make further provision, in connection with the registration of the birth of an illegitimate child, for entering the name of the father; and for connected purposes.}} |- | {{|Nurses Act 1969|public|47|25-07-1969|An Act to amend the Nurses Act 1957 and the Nurses (Scotland) Act 1951.}} |- | {{|Post Office Act 1969|public|48|25-07-1969|maintained=y|An Act to abolish the office of master of the Post Office, distribute the business conducted by the holder thereof amongst authorities constituted for the purpose and make provision consequential on the abolition of that office and the distribution of the business so conducted; to amend, replace or repeal certain provisions of the enactments relating to posts, telegraphs and savings banks; to amend the law relating to stamp duty; and to empower the Treasury to dispose of their interest in the shares of Cable and Wireless Limited.}} |- | {{|Education (Scotland) Act 1969|public|49|25-07-1969|An Act to amend the law relating to education in Scotland, and for connected purposes.}} |- | {{|Trustee Savings Banks Act 1969|public|50|25-07-1969|An Act to consolidate the Trustee Savings Banks Acts 1954 to 1968, with amendments to give effect to recommendations of the Law Commission and the Scottish Law Commission.}} |- | {{|Development of Tourism Act 1969|public|51|25-07-1969|maintained=y|An Act to provide for the establishment of a British Tourist Authority and Tourist Boards for England, Scotland and Wales with responsibility for promoting the development of tourism to and within Great Britain; to provide for the giving of financial assistance out of public funds for the provision of new hotels and the extension, alteration and improvement of existing hotels; to enable provision to be made for the registration of hotels and other establishments at which sleeping accommodation is provided by way of trade or business and for securing that the prices charged there for such accommodation are brought to the notice of persons seeking to avail themselves of it; and for connected purposes.}} |- | {{|Statute Law (Repeals) Act 1969|public|52|22-10-1969|maintained=y|An Act to promote the reform of the statute law by the repeal, in accordance with recommendations of the Law Commission, of certain enactments which (except in so far as their effect is preserved) are no longer of practical utility, and by making other provision in connection with the repeal of those enactments.}} |- | {{|Late Night Refreshment Houses Act 1969|public|53|22-10-1969|maintained=y|An Act to consolidate certain enactments relating to refreshment houses within the meaning of the Refreshment Houses Act 1860, with corrections and improvements made under the Consolidation of Enactments (Procedure) Act 1949.}} |- | {{|Children and Young Persons Act 1969|public|54|22-10-1969|maintained=y|An Act to amend the law relating to children and young persons; and for purposes connected therewith.}} |- | {{|Divorce Reform Act 1969|public|55|22-10-1969|maintained=y|An Act to amend the grounds for divorce and judicial separation; to facilitate reconciliation in matrimonial causes; and for purposes connected with the matters aforesaid.}} |- | {{|Auctions (Bidding Agreements) Act 1969|public|56|22-10-1969|maintained=y|An Act to amend the law with respect to proceedings for offences under the Auctions (Bidding Agreements) Act 1927; to make fresh provision as to the rights of a seller of goods by auction where an agreement subsists that a person or persons shall abstain from bidding for the goods; and for connected purposes.}} |- | {{|Employers' Liability (Compulsory Insurance) Act 1969|public|57|22-10-1969|maintained=y|An Act to require employers to insure against their liability for personal injury to their employees; and for purposes connected with the matter aforesaid.}} |- | {{|Administration of Justice Act 1969|public|58|22-10-1969|maintained=y|An Act to increase the jurisdiction of county courts and to amend the County Courts Act 1959; to make further provision for appeals from the High Court (whether in England and Wales or in Northern Ireland) to the House of Lords; to enable wills and codicils to be made for mentally disordered persons; to make provision for interim payments to be made where proceedings are pending, and for conferring powers to be exercisable by the court before the commencement of an action, and to make further provision with respect to interest on damages; to enable any jurisdiction of the High Court to be assigned to two or more Divisions concurrently; to enable the Appeal Tribunals under the Patents Act 1949 and the Registered Designs Act 1949 to consist of two or more judges; to change the title and qualification of clerks to registrars of the Chancery Division; to make further provision with respect to miscellaneous matters, that is to say, certain employments in the offices of the Supreme Court, records of grants of probate and grants of administration and the making of second and subsequent grants, admission as a public notary, pension rights and related matters in connection with certain judicial offices, and the stipend and fees of the Chancellor of the County Palatine of Durham; to extend the legislative power of the Parliament of Northern Ireland with respect to grand juries and indictments; and for purposes connected with the matters aforesaid.}} |- | {{|Law of Property Act 1969|public|59|22-10-1969|maintained=y|An Act to amend Part II of the Landlord and Tenant Act 1954; to provide for the closing of the Yorkshire deeds registries; to amend the law relating to dispositions of estates and interests in land and to land charges; to make further provision as to the powers of the Lands Tribunal and court in relation to restrictive covenants affecting land; and for purposes connected with those matters.}} }}

== Local acts ==
{{legislationuk|act |- | {{|Royal Bank of Scotland Order Confirmation Act 1968|local|43|05-12-1968|An Act to confirm a Provisional Order under the Private Legislation Procedure (Scotland) Act 1936, relating to the Royal Bank of Scotland.|po1=Royal Bank of Scotland Order 1968|Provisional Order to abolish the offices of governor, deputy governor and extraordinary director of the Royal Bank of Scotland; to amend the Royal Charters and Acts of Parliament relating to the Bank; and for other purposes.}} |- | {{|Advocates' Widows' and Orphans' Fund Order Confirmation Act 1968|local|44|18-12-1968|An Act to confirm a Provisional Order under the Private Legislation Procedure (Scotland) Act 1936, relating to the Advocates' Widows' and Orphans' Fund.|po1=Advocates' Widows' and Orphans' Fund Order 1968|Provisional Order to make provision in relation to the regulation and control of the Advocates' Widows' Fund, to repeal the Advocates' Widows' Fund Acts, 1830 to 1956, and for other purposes.}} |- | {{|Saint Mary, Hornsey Act 1969|local|1|30-01-1969|An Act to provide for the demolition of the church of Saint Mary, Hornsey, and for the erection of a new church in place thereof; to authorise the use for other purposes of parts of the site of the existing church and adjacent lands; and for purposes incidental thereto.}} |- | {{|Covent Garden Market Act 1969|local|2|06-03-1969|An Act to confer further powers on the Covent Garden Market Authority; to amend the provisions of the Covent Garden Market Acts 1961 and 1966; and for other purposes.}} |- | {{|Derbyshire County Council Act 1969|local|3|27-03-1969|An Act to confer further powers on the Derbyshire County Council in relation to the finances of the county; and for other purposes.}} |- | {{|Tees and Hartlepool Port Authority Act 1969|local|4|27-03-1969|An Act to change the name of the Tees and Hartlepools Port Authority; to extend the time for the completion of certain works by the Authority; to confer further powers on the Authority; and for other purposes.}} |- | {{|Derby Corporation Act 1969|local|5|17-04-1969|An Act to confer further powers on the mayor, aldermen and burgesses of the borough of Derby in relation to the superannuation fund maintained by the council of that borough and in relation to the finances of that borough; and for other purposes.}} |- | {{|Bournemouth Corporation Act 1969|local|6|17-04-1969|An Act to make further provision for the investment of moneys forming part of the superannuation fund maintained by the mayor, aldermen and burgesses of the borough of Bournemouth; to confer further powers upon the said mayor, aldermen and burgesses with regard to finance; and for other purposes.}} |- | {{|Coventry Corporation Act 1969|local|7|17-04-1969|An Act to confer powers upon the lord mayor, aldermen and citizens of the city of Coventry with regard to the raising of money by the issue of bills; and for other purposes.}} |- | {{|Northampton County Council Act 1969|local|8|17-04-1969|An Act to make further provision for the investment of moneys forming part of the superannuation fund maintained by the Northampton County Council, to confer further powers upon that Council with regard to finance; and for other purposes.}} |- | {{|Chelsea College, University of London Act 1969|local|9|17-04-1969|An Act to dissolve the Chelsea College of Science and Technology and to transfer all the rights, property and liabilities of that college to the Chelsea College, University of London; to provide for the pooling of investments and moneys of certain endowment funds of that College; and for other purposes.}} |- | {{|Glasgow Corporation (Superannuation &c.) Order Confirmation Act 1969|local|10|24-04-1969|An Act to confirm a Provisional Order under the Private Legislation Procedure (Scotland) Act 1936, relating to Glasgow Corporation (Superannuation &c.).|po1=Glasgow Corporation (Superannuation &c.) Order 1969|Provisional Order to extend the powers of the Corporation of the city of Glasgow with respect to the investment of their superannuation fund; to amend the Glasgow Corporation (No. 2) Order 1965; to confer power on the Corporation to facilitate the completion of title to certain lands compulsorily acquired; and for other purposes.}} |- | {{|Barnsley Corporation Act 1969|local|11|24-04-1969|An Act to make further provision with respect to the market undertaking of the mayor, aldermen and burgesses of the county borough of Barnsley; and for purposes connected therewith.}} |- | {{|Foremen and Staff Mutual Benefit Society (Application of Rules) &c. Act 1969|local|12|16-05-1969|An Act to make provision with respect to the application of the rules of the Foremen and Staff Mutual Benefit Society, to make further provision with regard to the making of new rules; and for other purposes.}} |- | {{|Barclays Bank Act 1969|local|13|16-05-1969|maintained=y|An Act to carry into effect the transfer to Barclays Bank Limited of the undertaking of Martins Bank Limited; and for other purposes.}} |- | {{|Teesside Corporation Act 1969|local|14|16-05-1969|An Act to confer further powers on the mayor, aldermen and burgesses of the county borough of Teesside in relation to the finances of the county borough; and for other purposes.}} |- | {{|Phœnix Assurance Company Act 1969|local|15|16-05-1969|An Act to repeal the Phœnix Assurance Company's Act 1895; and for other purposes.}} |- | {{|Ryde Corporation Act 1969|local|16|16-05-1969|An Act to confer further powers on the mayor, aldermen and burgesses of the borough of Ryde in relation to the improvement, local government and finances of the borough; and for other purposes.}} |- | {{|Saint Mildred, Bread Street Act 1969|local|17|16-05-1969|An Act to free land appurtenant to the former church of Saint Mildred, Bread Street, in the City of London, from the restrictions attaching to it as a disused burial ground in the City of London; to authorise the disposition thereof and the use thereof for other purposes; and for purposes incidental thereto.}} |- | {{|Salisbury Railway and Market House Act 1969|local|18|16-05-1969|An Act to confirm an agreement between the Salisbury Railway and Market House Company Limited in liquidation and the mayor, aldermen and citizens of the city of New Sarum for the sale of the Market House, Salisbury, and certain other property; to relieve the Company of its statutory obligations to provide a market; to provide for the repeal of the enactments relating to the Company; and for other purposes.}} |- | {{|Aberdeen Corporation (Fish Market) Order Confirmation Act 1969|local|19|25-06-1969|An Act to confirm a Provisional Order under the Private Legislation Procedure (Scotland) Act 1936, relating to the Aberdeen Corporation (Fish Market).|po1=Aberdeen Corporation (Fish Market) Order 1969|Provisional Order to provide for the transfer of the fish market belonging to the Corporation of the City of Aberdeen to the Aberdeen Harbour Board; to confer powers on the said board with respect to the said fish market; and for purposes connected therewith.}} |- | {{|Edinburgh Trades Maiden Fund Order Confirmation Act 1969|local|20|25-06-1969|An Act to confirm a Provisional Order under the Private Legislation Procedure (Scotland) Act 1936, relating to the Edinburgh Trades Maiden Fund.|po1=Edinburgh Trades Maiden Fund Order 1969|Provisional Order to constitute a fund for the benefit of the daughters and granddaughters of craftsmen in Edinburgh and others; to confer further powers on the Governors of the Trades Maiden Hospital in Edinburgh; and for purposes connected therewith.}} |- | {{|Luton Corporation Act 1969|local|21|25-06-1969|An Act to confer further powers upon the mayor, aldermen and burgesses of the county borough of Luton with regard to the finances of the borough; and for other purposes.}} |- | {{|National Westminster Bank Act 1969|local|22|25-06-1969|An Act to provide for the transfer to National Westminster Bank Limited of the undertakings of District Bank Limited, National Provincial Bank Limited and Westminster Bank Limited; and for other purposes incidental thereto and consequential thereon.}} |- | {{|British Transport Docks Act 1969|local|23|25-06-1969|An Act to empower the British Transport Docks Board to construct works and to acquire lands; to extend the time for the compulsory purchase of certain lands; to confer further powers on the Board; and for other purposes.}} |- | {{|Tweed Fisheries Act 1969|local|24|25-06-1969|maintained=y|An Act to amend the Tweed Fisheries Act 1857 and the Tweed Fisheries Amendment Act 1859; to apply certain provisions of those Acts to freshwater fish; and for other purposes.}} |- | {{|Lands Improvement Company's Amendment Act 1969|local|25|25-06-1969|An Act to extend the powers of the Lands Improvement Company to advance money; to confer further powers on the Company with regard to finance and administration; and for other purposes.}} |- | {{|Corn Exchange Act 1969|local|26|25-06-1969|An Act to increase the capital and borrowing powers of the Corn Exchange Company; to convert the existing capital stock into shares; to confer further powers on the Company; and for other purposes.}} |- | {{|Farmer & Company, Limited (Transfer of Registration) Act 1969|local|27|25-06-1969|An Act to make provision for the transfer to the State of New South Wales in the Commonwealth of Australia of the registered office of Farmer & Company, Limited; for the cesser of application to that company of provisions of the Companies Acts 1948 to 1967; and for other purposes incidental thereto.}} |- | {{|Hardy Brothers, Limited (Transfer of Registration) Act 1969|local|28|25-06-1969|An Act to make provision for the transfer to the State of New South Wales in the Commonwealth of Australia of the registered office of Hardy Brothers, Limited; for the cesser of application to that company of provisions of the Companies Acts 1948 to 1967; and for other purposes incidental thereto.}} |- | {{|Bristol Clifton and West of England Zoological Society Act 1969|local|29|25-06-1969|An Act to increase the borrowing powers of the Bristol Clifton and West of England Zoological Society; and for other purposes.}} |- | {{|Ministry of Housing and Local Government Provisional Order Confirmation (King's Lynn) Act 1969|local|30|25-07-1969|An Act to confirm a Provisional Order of the Minister of Housing and Local Government relating to the borough of King's Lynn.|po1=King's Lynn Order 1969|Provisional Order amending a Local Act and a Confirming Act.}} |- | {{|Clyde Port Authority Order Confirmation Act 1969|local|31|25-07-1969|An Act to confirm a Provisional Order under the Private Legislation Procedure (Scotland) Act 1936, relating to the Clyde Port Authority.|po1=Clyde Port Authority Order 1969|Provisional Order to confer further powers on the Clyde Port Authority and to amend and repeal provisions of the Clyde Port Authority Order 1965; and for other purposes.}} |- | {{|Dundee Corporation Order Confirmation Act 1969|local|32|25-07-1969|An Act to confirm a Provisional Order under the Private Legislation Procedure (Scotland) Act, 1936, relating to Dundee Corporation.|po1=Dundee Corporation Order 1969|Provisional Order to amend the Dundee Corporation (Consolidated Powers) Order, 1957, and to confer further powers on the Corporation of the city and royal burgh of Dundee in respect of the general administration of the said city and royal burgh and for other purposes.}} |- | {{|East Green, Aberdeen Order Confirmation Act 1969|local|33|25-07-1969|An Act to confirm a Provisional Order under the Private Legislation Procedure (Scotland) Act 1936, relating to East Green, Aberdeen.|po1=East Green, Aberdeen Order 1969|Provisional Order to authorise Commercial Union Assurance Company Limited to construct buildings or structures bridging over East Green in the city and royal burgh of Aberdeen; and for other purposes.}} |- | {{|Forth Ports Authority Order Confirmation Act 1969|local|34|25-07-1969|An Act to confirm a Provisional Order under the Private Legislation Procedure (Scotland) Act 1936, relating to the Forth Ports Authority.|po1=Forth Ports Authority Order 1969|Provisional Order to amend the Forth Harbour Reorganisation Scheme 1966; to confer further powers on the Forth Ports Authority; and for other purposes.}} |- | {{|Whitgift Charities Act 1969|local|35|25-07-1969|An Act to make further provision with regard to the Whitgift Almshouse Charity in the London Borough of Croydon; to confer further powers on the Governing body of the Whitgift Educational Foundation and to provide for the incorporation by statute of the said Governing body; and for other purposes.}} |- | {{|Lever Park Act 1969|local|36|25-07-1969|An Act to transfer to and vest in the county council of the administrative county of the county palatine of Lancaster certain land of the lord mayor, aldermen and citizens of the city of Liverpool forming part of Lever Park in the parish of Rivington in the rural district of Chorley; to provide for the extinguishment of public rights in, upon or over the same; to confer power upon the said lord mayor, aldermen and citizens to transfer Lever Park; and for other purposes.}} |- | {{|Portsmouth Corporation Act 1969|local|37|25-07-1969|An Act to make further provision for the local government and finances of the city of Portsmouth; and for other purposes.}} |- | {{|York Corporation Act 1969|local|38|25-07-1969|An Act to confer further powers upon the lord mayor, aldermen and citizens of the city and county of the city of York in relation to lands and streets; to make further provision in reference to the improvement, health, local government and finances of the city; and for other purposes.}} |- | {{|City of London (Various Powers) Act 1969|local|39|25-07-1969|An Act to confer powers upon the Corporation of London with respect to the City of London Cemetery and Crematorium, the re-accommodation of the City of London School, the investment of the Corporation of London Charities Pool, the control of walkways; and for other purposes.}} |- | {{|Witham Navigation Company Act 1969|local|40|25-07-1969|An Act to reorganise the capital structure of the Company of Proprietors of the Witham Navigation by reducing the nominal value of the shares and by creating and issuing to the Proprietors of the Company amounts of unsecured loan stock; to authorise the Company to dispose of their reversion to the lease of the Witham Navigation; to confer further powers on the Company; and for other purposes.}} |- | {{|Greater London Council (Money) Act 1969|local|41|25-07-1969|An Act to regulate the expenditure on capital account and on lending to other persons by the Greater London Council during the financial period from 1st April 1969 to 30th September 1970; and for other purposes.}} |- | {{|Saint Saviour, Paddington Act 1969|local|42|25-07-1969|An Act to provide for the demolition of the church of Saint Saviour, Paddington and for the erection of a new church and other buildings; to authorise the use for other purposes of part of the site of the present church; and for purposes incidental thereto.}} |- | {{|British Railways Act 1969|local|43|25-07-1969|An Act to empower the British Railways Board to construct a work and to acquire lands; to extend the time for the compulsory purchase of certain lands; to confer further powers on the Board and C. A. E. C. Howard Limited; and for other purposes.}} |- | {{|Kidderminster Corporation Act 1969|local|44|25-07-1969|An Act to confer further powers on the mayor, aldermen and burgesses of the borough of Kidderminster; to make further provision with regard to the health, local government, improvement and finances of that borough; and for other purposes.}} |- | {{|Saint Stephen, Clapham Park Act 1969|local|45|25-07-1969|An Act to provide for the demolition of the church of Saint Stephen, Clapham Park, and for the provision of a new church and other buildings; to authorise the use for other purposes of the site of the present church; and for purposes incidental thereto.}} |- | {{|Bedford Corporation Act 1969|local|46|25-07-1969|An Act to confer further powers upon the mayor, aldermen and burgesses of the borough of Bedford in relation to lands and streets; to make further provision with regard to the health, local government, welfare, improvement and finances of the borough; and for other purposes.}} |- | {{|Cardiff Corporation Act 1969|local|47|25-07-1969|An Act to empower the lord mayor, aldermen and citizens of the city of Cardiff to construct works and to make further provision with regard to the health, local government, welfare, improvement and finances of the city; and for other purposes.}} |- | {{|Bradford Corporation Act 1969|local|48|25-07-1969|An Act to confer further powers on the lord mayor, aldermen and citizens of the city of Bradford, to make further provision with regard to the health, local government, welfare, improvement and finances of the city; and for other purposes.}} |- | {{|Essex River and South Essex Water Act 1969|local|49|25-07-1969|An Act to empower the Essex River Authority to construct a barrage across the estuary of the river Stour and other works; to empower the South Essex Waterworks Company to construct works and to abstract water from the river Stour; to empower the Essex River Authority and the South Essex Waterworks Company to acquire lands and rights; to confer further powers on the Essex River Authority and on the South Essex Waterworks Company; and for other purposes.}} |- | {{|London Transport Act 1969|local|50|25-07-1969|An Act to empower the London Transport Board to construct works and to acquire lands; to extend the time for the compulsory purchase of certain lands; to confer further powers on the Board; and for other purposes.}} |- | {{|North East Lincolnshire Water Act 1969|local|51|25-07-1969|An Act to make provision with respect to the supply by the North East Lincolnshire Water Board of water for non-domestic purposes in pursuance of agreements made under section 27 of the Water Act 1945; and for other purposes.}} |- | {{|Greater London Council (General Powers) Act 1969|local|52|25-07-1969|An Act to confer further powers upon the Greater London Council and other authorities; and for other purposes.}} |- | {{|Dudley Corporation Act 1969|local|53|22-10-1969|An Act to re-enact with amendments and to extend certain local enactments in force in the county borough of Dudley; to confer further powers upon the mayor, aldermen and burgesses of that borough; to make further provision in regard to the health, local government, improvement and finances of that borough; and for other purposes.}} |- | {{|Warley Corporation Act 1969|local|54|22-10-1969|An Act to re-enact with amendments and to extend certain local enactments in force in the county borough of Warley; to confer further powers upon the mayor, aldermen and burgesses of that borough; to make further provision in regard to the health, local government, improvement and finances of that borough; and for other purposes.}} |- | {{|Liverpool Corporation Act 1969|local|55|22-10-1969|An Act to confer further powers on the lord mayor, aldermen and citizens of the city of Liverpool in relation to walkways; to make further provision for the improvement, local government and finances of the city; and for other purposes.}} |- | {{|Worcestershire County Council Act 1969|local|56|22-10-1969|An Act to confer further powers on the Worcestershire County Council and on local authorities in the administrative county of Worcester in relation to lands, amenities and highways and the local government, improvement, health and educational services and finances of the county and of the boroughs and districts therein; to enable the Arley Ferry across the river Severn to be discontinued; and for other purposes.}} |- | {{|Blackpool Corporation Act 1969|local|57|22-10-1969|An Act to confer further powers upon the mayor, aldermen and burgesses of the borough of Blackpool, to make further provision for the improvement and local government of the borough; to enact provisions with regard to markets, finance and superannuation; and for other purposes.}} |- | {{|Walsall Corporation Act 1969|local|58|22-10-1969|An Act to re-enact with amendments and to extend certain local enactments in force in the county borough of Walsall; to make further provision for the health, local government, improvement and finances of that borough; to confer further powers upon the mayor, aldermen and burgesses of that borough; and for other purposes.}} |- | {{|West Bromwich Corporation Act 1969|local|59|22-10-1969|An Act to re-enact with amendments and to extend certain local enactments in force in the county borough of West Bromwich; to make further provision for the health, local government, improvement and finances of that borough; to confer further powers upon the mayor, aldermen and burgesses of that borough; and for other purposes.}} |- | {{|Wolverhampton Corporation Act 1969|local|60|22-10-1969|An Act to re-enact with amendments and to extend certain local enactments in force in the county borough of Wolverhampton; to make further provision for the health, local government, improvement and finances of that borough; to confer further powers upon the mayor, aldermen and burgesses of that borough; and for other purposes.}} }}
