= Southern Diocese (Free Church of England) =

Reformed Episcopal church in the United Kingdom

The Southern Diocese of the Free Church of England, is a Free Church of England and a Reformed Episcopal Church diocese which covers the southern half of England with the Northern Diocese (Free Church of England) covering the more northerly parts of the British Isles.

== Bishops ==
- 1889–1896: Benjamin Price
- 1896–1901: Samuel Dicksee
- 1904–1927: Richard Brook Lander
- 1927–1934: Joseph Fenn
- 1934–1955: John Magee
- 1955–1968: George Forbes-Smith
- 1968–1971: Ambrose Bodfish
- 1972–1976: William Watkins
- 1977–1990: Arthur Ward
- 1990–2006: Kenneth Powell
- 2007–present: Paul Hunt
- 2025-present: Mark Gretason (Assistant Bishop)

== Churches ==
Church	Location	Founded	Link	Minister	Notes
St Jude, Balham	Balham, London	1887		Mark Gretason	
St Andrew, Bentley	Bentley, West Midlands	1943		Paul Hunt	
Emmanuel, Birmingham	Saltley, West Midlands	1903		Daniel Choe	
Christ Church, Broadstairs	Broadstairs, Kent	1904		Jabson Watson	
Christ Church, Harlesden	Harlesden, London	1886		Vacant	
Christ Church, Willesborough	Willesborough, Ashford, Kent	1874		Vacant	
St Francis, Shoreham-by-Sea	Shoreham-by-Sea, West Sussex	2012		Stephen Lawson	
Christ Church, Leigh-on-Sea	Leigh-on-Sea, Essex	1889		Eric Fenwick	
