= Bridgetown, Devon =

Coordinates: 50.430°N 3.680°W

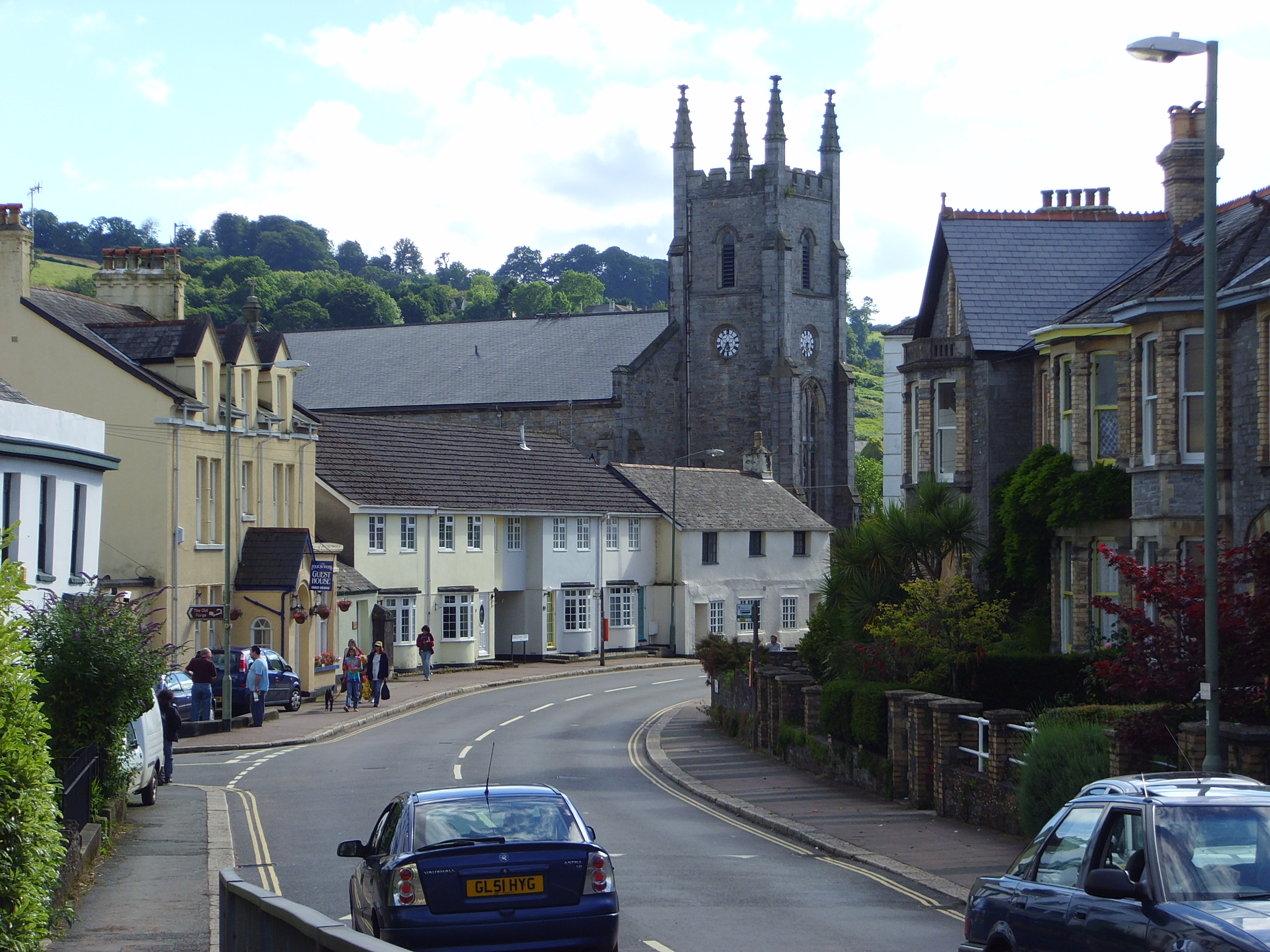
Bridgetown, looking west towards Totnes

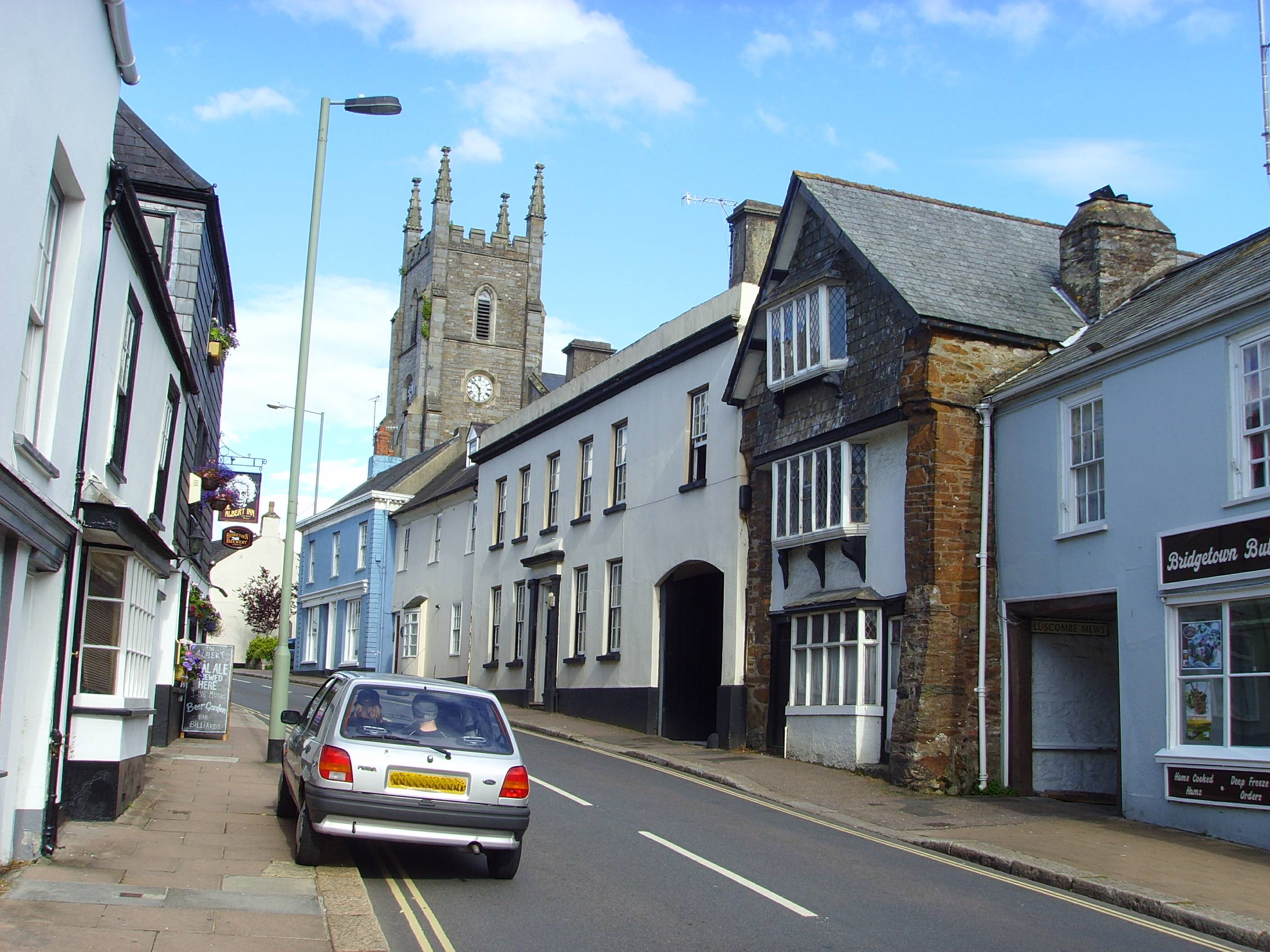
Looking east towards Paignton

Bridgetown occupies the left bank of the Dart in the town of Totnes, Devon, England.

It resulted from the first bridge being built across the river for the town. The river is in a valley, with Bridgetown on the south eastern slopes opposite Totnes.

St John's Church, Bridgetown is the Church of England facility for the area and is part of the parish of Totnes with Bridgetown, There is also a village hall, two large grassy play areas, a dental surgery, a farm, an artisan chocolaterie, two small corner shops, a Chinese takeaway, one public house, which includes its own brewery, Longmarsh – a riverside walk also used for military training, a rowing club, a caravan park and a veterinary clinic.
