= Diocese of the South =

Diocese of the South may refer to:

- Anglican Diocese of the South (part of the Anglican Church in North America)
- Orthodox Church in America Diocese of the South
- Dioceses of continuing Anglican jurisdictions, including:
  - Episcopal Missionary Church
  - Anglican Catholic Church
