= Canterbury (disambiguation) =

Canterbury is a city located in the county of Kent in southeast England. It may also refer to:

== Places ==
=== Australia ===
- Canterbury, New South Wales, a suburb of Sydney
  - Electoral district of Canterbury, an electoral district in the New South Wales Legislative Assembly
  - City of Canterbury, New South Wales, a local government area of Sydney
- Canterbury, Queensland, a small settlement
- Canterbury, Victoria, a suburb of Melbourne
  - Canterbury railway station, Melbourne

=== Canada ===
- Canterbury, New Brunswick, a community within the village of Lakeland Ridges
- Canterbury Parish, New Brunswick
- Canterbury Falls, Ancaster, Ontario
- Urbandale, Ottawa, a neighbourhood in Ottawa sometimes called Canterbury.

=== New Zealand ===
- Canterbury Region, a region in the South Island of New Zealand
- Canterbury Province, a former province of New Zealand
- Canterbury Plains
- Canterbury Bight, a stretch of coastline

=== England ===
- Canterbury (UK Parliament constituency)
- City of Canterbury, the local government district in Kent
- Province of Canterbury, one of two ecclesiastical provinces which constitute the Church of England
- Diocese of Canterbury, a Church of England diocese
- Oriel Square, formerly Canterbury Square, Oxford

=== United States ===
- Canterbury, Connecticut, a town
- Canterbury, Delaware, an unincorporated community
- Canterbury, New Hampshire, a town
- Canterbury, West Virginia, an unincorporated community

=== Elsewhere ===
- Canterbury, Jamaica, a squatter suburb of Montego Bay
- Canterbury Spur, Marie Byrd Land, Antarctica
- 3563 Canterbury, an asteroid

== Schools ==
- Canterbury Christ Church University, Kent, England
- University of Canterbury, Christchurch, New Zealand
- Canterbury College (disambiguation)
- Canterbury High School (disambiguation)
- Canterbury School (disambiguation)
- Canterbury University (Seychelles), an unaccredited institution

== Music ==
- Canterbury scene, a style of progressive rock that originated in Canterbury, England
- Canterbury (album), a 1983 album by Diamond Head
- Canterbury (band), an English alternative rock band

== Ships ==
- Canterbury (ship), the ship which transported William Penn and James Logan from England to Philadelphia in 1699
- HMS Canterbury, several ships of the British Royal Navy
- HMNZS Canterbury (F421), a decommissioned New Zealand Navy frigate
- HMNZS Canterbury (L421), a multi-role vessel in the New Zealand Navy
- SS Canterbury, a South Eastern and Chatham Railway ferry

== Sports ==
- Canterbury (women's field hockey team), an amateur team in New Zealand
- Canterbury Golf Club, a golf club in Ohio, US
- Canterbury Open, a darts tournament in Christchurch, New Zealand
- Canterbury Park, a horse racing facility in Minnesota, US
- Canterbury Rugby Football Union, or Canterbury, the governing body for rugby union in a portion of the Canterbury Region of New Zealand
- Canterbury Stakes, an Australian Thoroughbred horse race
- Canterbury United Dragons, a men's football team in the New Zealand Football Championship
- Canterbury United Pride, a football team in the New Zealand National Women's League
- Canterbury-Bankstown Bulldogs, an Australian professional rugby league club that plays in the National Rugby League

== People and fictional characters ==
- Chandler Canterbury (born 1998), American child actor and producer
- Dave Canterbury (born 1963), American survival expert and television personality
- Mark Canterbury (born 1964), known by the ring name Henry O. Godwinn, American professional wrestler
- Ray Canterbury (born 1969), American politician
- Tim Canterbury, a character in the BBC sitcom The Office

== Other uses ==
- Canterbury (furniture), a small piece of furniture made originally to house sheet music
- Canterbury of New Zealand, or just Canterbury, a UK-based sports clothing company
- Canterbury Hospital, Campsie, Sydney, New South Wales, Australia
- Kent and Canterbury Hospital, Canterbury, Kent, England
- Canterbury Hotel, Indianapolis, Indiana, US, on the National Register of Historic Places (NRHP)
- Canterbury Presbyterian Church, Cornwall, New York, US, on the NRHP
- Canterbury Road, North Oxford, England
- HM Prison Canterbury, a former prison in Canterbury, Kent, England
- Viscount Canterbury, an extinct title in the Peerage of the United Kingdom
- Canterbury power station

== See also ==
- Project Canterbury, an online archive of material related to the history of Anglicanism
