= Canterbury School =

Canterbury School may refer to:

- Canterbury School (Connecticut), a private, co-educational college preparatory lay-Catholic boarding school in New Milford, Connecticut
- Canterbury High School (Accokeek, Maryland), was a private, Episcopal, co-educational college preparatory school in Accokeek, Maryland
- Canterbury School (Fort Myers, Florida), a private, co-educational college preparatory day school in Fort Myers, Florida
- Canterbury School (St. Petersburg, Florida), a private, co-educational college preparatory day school in St Petersburg, Florida
- Canterbury High School (Fort Wayne, Indiana), a private, co-educational college preparatory day school in Fort Wayne, Indiana
- Canterbury School (Gran Canaria), a private, profit-making co-educational bilingual day school in Las Palmas de Gran Canaria, Spain
- Canterbury School (Greensboro, North Carolina), an independent PreK-8 Episcopal day school in Greensboro, North Carolina
- Canterbury School (Seventh century school founded by Theodore of Canterbury)
- Canterbury Christian School, a private, Classical Christian school in Los Altos, California

== See also ==
- Canterbury High School (disambiguation)
