= The Moral Compass =

1995 anthology edited by William Bennett

The Moral Compass: Stories for a Life's Journey
- Editor: William Bennett
- Language: English
- Subject: Morality
- Genre: Anthology
- Publisher: Simon & Schuster
- Publication date: October 20, 1995
- Publication place: United States
- Pages: 824
- ISBN: 0-684-80313-5

The Moral Compass (subtitled A Companion to The Book of Virtues and Stories for a Life's Journey) is a 1995 anthology edited by William Bennett. A follow-up to the 1993 collection The Book of Virtues, it consists of seven chapters devoted to different stages of life, with passages from Western civilization and various other cultures. As with its predecessor, the collection consists largely of public-domain material, features texts of escalating complexity in each chapter, and gives each individual selection a short introductory note by compiler Bennett.

Though Bennett intended the original Virtues as a one-off title, audience demand and feedback encouraged him by early 1994 to develop successor installments. Follow-up Compass was part of those efforts, and was published by Simon & Schuster the following October to mainly positive reviews; 730,000 copies were issued and 550,000 sold during its first year. It was also accompanied in 1995 by two children's spin-offs in print, along with the PBS animated series Adventures from the Book of Virtues in 1996.

== Overview ==
Following the model of 1993's The Book of Virtues, The Moral Compass consists of seven chapters, each pertaining to a different stage of life: "Home and Hearth", "Into the World", "Standing Fast", "Easing the Path", "Mothers and Fathers, Husbands and Wives", "Citizenship and Leadership", and "What We Live By". This chapter scheme was devised by Bob Asahina, Simon & Schuster's vice president and senior editor. As before, the collection draws predominantly from public-domain sources, with the simple texts beginning each chapter giving way to more complex ones; compiler William Bennett gives a short introductory note to each passage.

Compass features selections from Thornton W. Burgess, Alexis de Tocqueville, Emily Dickinson, Thomas Jefferson, Edward Lear, Theodore Roosevelt, Sojourner Truth, Alfred Lord Tennyson, Mother Teresa, Mark Twain, and Eudora Welty among others, with return appearances by Charles Dickens, Leo Tolstoy and Oscar Wilde. Biographical stories about Ludwig van Beethoven, John Milton, Florence Nightingale, and Jackie Robinson are also included, along with the legend of Pocahontas and John Smith. According to Publishers Weekly, the passages "come mostly from times when masculine virtue was considered the norm and men took center stage. Most are from European or Western culture, but a not inconsiderable number are drawn from African, Asian and Latin American traditions."

== Development ==
"In this age of sequels, another compilation of stories by American's self-appointed Virtues Czar is simply good economic sense."

— Bob Hoover, Pittsburgh Post-Gazette

Simon & Schuster published The Book of Virtues in November 1993 to word of mouth and unexpected success. Compiler Bennett was a former Secretary of Education for the United States and director of the Office of National Drug Control Policy. He initially ruled out a follow-up to the collection, "but was swayed by readers who urged him to do so and even sent in their own nominations." This led to preparations for print and multimedia successors from March through September 1994, with the print installments modeled after their 1993 precursor. As Bennett joked to the Newsweek team, "Maybe I'll call [the sequel] 'Son of the Book of Virtues'." John Cribb, a friend of his and a former speech writer for the Education Department, returned as assistant compiler. The follow-up's official title, The Moral Compass, was revealed in a May 1995 Los Angeles Times story.

== Release ==
The Moral Compass was published on October 20, 1995, and debuted in 15th place on The New York Times Best Seller List (Nonfiction) for November 5. Out of the 730,000 copies in its first printing, 550,000 were sold in its first year of publication. It was released alongside two companion titles for young audiences, The Book of Virtues for Young People and The Children's Book of Virtues, and the 1996 PBS animated series Adventures from the Book of Virtues.

== Reception ==
Response to The Moral Compass was slightly more positive than its forebear, albeit with a few reservations. (Note: For details, see The Book of Virtues §§ Reviews and Critiques.) Kirkus called it "a colorful patchwork of pieces that are irresistible for bedtime reading aloud", while Steve Lee of Arizona's The Daily Courier recommended it. The Lexington Herald-Leader's Robert Kaiser called it a "reassuring read" and a "memorable journey" that was "even more delightful" than the original Virtues; he singled out "Distance", a short story by Raymond Carver, as the highlight of this volume. "Don't cheat yourself out of this literary treat," he added, "because of its somewhat sanctimonious title or the prominence of Bennett's name on the jacket."

Melinda Miller of The Buffalo News called the book "a steady companion" for casual readers and parents alike, and took note of the Christian overtones, but warned of the dated nature and simplistic style of some passages. John Sweeney of Wilmington, Delaware's News Journal lauded the selection quality, but said that "Bennett's running commentary seems distracted and often silly...[to the point of being] cryptic". Terry Teachout of the National Review remarked that "The Moral Compass is to The Book of Virtues as Life with Mother is to Life with father....[and] is crammed full of very good things." With respect to the franchise's demographic prospects, however, he added that "Bill Bennett's heart is definitely in the right place. Unfortunately, it may be somewhat later than he thinks."

In a less enthusiastic review, Michael Walzer of The New Republic pointed out the narrative and didactic shortcomings of the selections. "Bennett's retellings," he said, "are founded on distrust[, the] extent of [which] is comical." While declaring Compass a modern-day update of Grolier's The Book of Knowledge, Bob Hoover of the Pittsburgh Post-Gazette found fault with the paper quality and illustrations, comparing the latter to clip art. "If he or any moral reformer wants to 'do good,'" he concluded his review, "there are plenty of positive examples around today without resorting to 100-year-old platitudes. But, there's no royalty to pay on them."

Overseas reviews were favorable; Canada's The Kitchener Record said that "it would make an excellent addition to any home, school, municipal or church library", while Fong Leong Ming of Malaysia's New Straits Times wrote, "Bennett may sound patronising or preachy in his introductions at times but he's okay by me. Just read those wonderful stories he has compiled in this handy tome and you'd realise he's doing a great job at moral guidance."
