= Canterbury High School =

Canterbury High School can refer to:

== Canada ==
- Canterbury High School (New Brunswick)
- Canterbury High School (Ottawa)

== United Kingdom ==
- The Canterbury Academy, Canterbury, Kent, formerly the Canterbury High School

== United States ==
- Canterbury School (Connecticut)
- Canterbury School (Fort Wayne, Indiana)
- Canterbury High School (Accokeek, Maryland)

== See also ==
- Canterbury School (disambiguation)
