= William Bennett =

3rd United States Secretary of Education

Bill Bennett
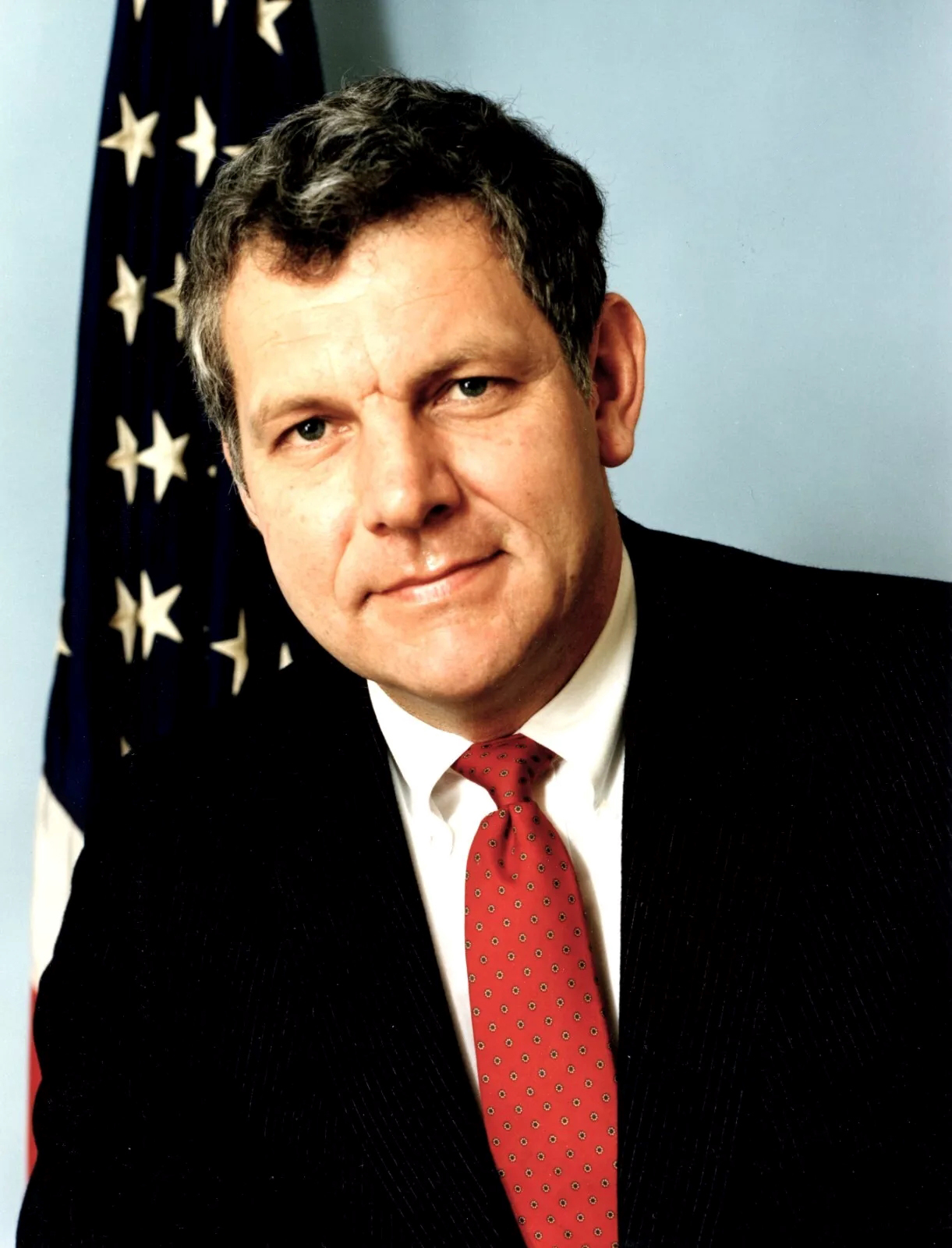
- Official portrait, 1980s

Director of the Office of National Drug Control Policy
- In office March 13, 1989 – December 13, 1990
- President: George H. W. Bush
- Preceded by: Position established
- Succeeded by: Bob Martinez

3rd United States Secretary of Education
- In office February 6, 1985 – September 20, 1988
- President: Ronald Reagan
- Preceded by: Terrel Bell
- Succeeded by: Lauro Cavazos

Chair of the National Endowment for the Humanities
- In office December 24, 1981 – February 6, 1985
- President: Ronald Reagan
- Preceded by: Joseph Duffey
- Succeeded by: John Agresto (acting)

Personal details
- Born: William John Bennett; July 31, 1943 (age 83) New York City, New York, U.S.
- Party: Democratic (before 1986); Republican (1986–present)
- Spouse: Elayne Glover (m. 1982)
- Children: 2
- Relatives: Robert S. Bennett (brother)
- Education: Williams College (BA); University of Texas, Austin (MA, PhD); Harvard University (JD)

William John Bennett (born July 31, 1943) is an American conservative politician and political commentator who served as the third United States secretary of education from 1985 to 1988 under President Ronald Reagan. He also held the post of director of the Office of National Drug Control Policy under George H. W. Bush.

== Early life and education ==
Bennett was born July 31, 1943, to a Catholic family in Brooklyn, the son of Nancy (née Walsh), a medical secretary, and F. Robert Bennett, a banker. His family moved to Washington, D.C., where he attended Gonzaga College High School. He graduated from Williams College in 1965, where he was a member of the Kappa Alpha Society, and received a Ph.D. from the University of Texas at Austin in political philosophy in 1970. He also has a J.D. from Harvard Law School, graduating in 1971.

== Career ==
=== Educational institutions ===
Bennett was an associate dean of the College of Liberal Arts at Boston University from 1971 to 1972 and then became an assistant professor of philosophy and an assistant to John Silber, the president of the college, from 1972 to 1976. In May 1979, Bennett became the director of the National Humanities Center, an independent institute in North Carolina, after the death of its founder Charles Frankel.

=== Federal offices ===
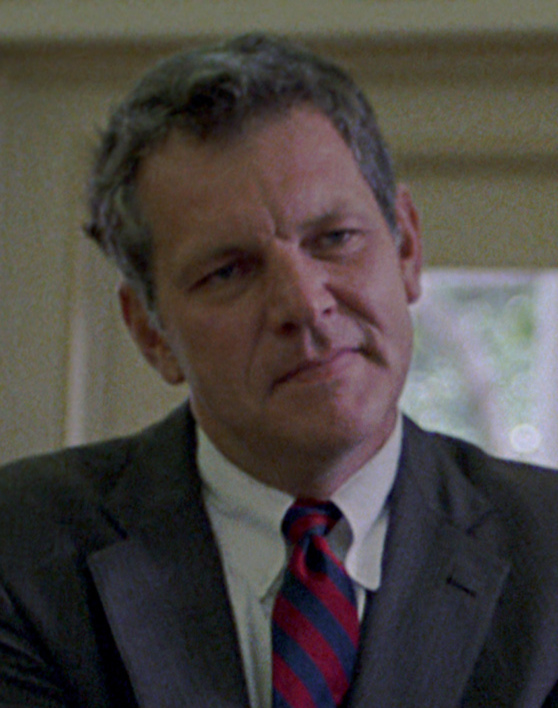
Bennett as Secretary of Education in 1985

In 1981 President Reagan appointed Bennett to chair the National Endowment for the Humanities (NEH), where he served until Reagan appointed him Secretary of Education in 1985. Reagan initially nominated Mel Bradford to the position, but due to Bradford's pro-Confederate views, Bennett was appointed. This event was later marked as the watershed in the divergence between paleoconservatives, who backed Bradford, and neoconservatives, led by Irving Kristol, who supported Bennett.

While at NEH, Bennett published "To Reclaim a Legacy: A Report on the Humanities in Higher Education", a 63-page report. It was based on an assessment of the teaching and learning of the humanities at the baccalaureate level, conducted by a blue-ribbon study group of 31 nationally prominent authorities on higher education convened by NEH.

In May 1986, Bennett switched from the Democratic to the Republican Party. In September 1988, Bennett resigned as Sectetary of Education, to join the Washington law firm of Dunnels, Duvall, Bennett, and Porter. In March 1989, he returned to the federal government, becoming the first Director of the Office of National Drug Control Policy, appointed by President George H. W. Bush. He was confirmed by the Senate in a 97–2 vote. He left that position in December 1990.

=== Radio and television ===
In April 2004, Bennett began hosting Morning in America, a nationally syndicated radio program produced and distributed by Dallas, Texas-based Salem Communications. The show aired live weekdays from 6:00 to 9:00 a.m. Eastern Time, and was one of the only syndicated conservative talk shows in the morning drive time slot. However, few stations carried the show due to a preference for local shows in this slot, and the show was mainly broadcast on Salem-owned outlets. Morning in America was also carried on Sirius Satellite Radio, on Channel 144, also known as the Patriot Channel. Bennett retired from full-time radio on March 31, 2016.

In 2008, Bennett became the host of a CNN weekly talk show, Beyond the Politics. The show did not have a long run, but Bennett remained a CNN contributor until he was fired in 2013 by then-new CNN president Jeff Zucker.

Bennett has been moderating The Wise Guys, a Sunday night show on Fox News, since January 2018. Carried on Fox Nation as well, participants include Tyrus, Byron York, Ari Fleischer, Victor Davis Hanson, and others.

=== Author, speaker, and pundit ===
Bennett writes for National Review Online, National Review and Commentary, and is a former senior editor of National Review.

Bennett is a member of the National Security Advisory Council of the Center for Security Policy (CSP). He was co-director of Empower America and was a Distinguished Fellow in Cultural Policy Studies at The Heritage Foundation. Long active in United States Republican Party politics, he is now an author and speaker.

Bennett was the Washington Fellow of the Claremont Institute. He was also a commentator for CNN until 2013.

He is an advisor to Project Lead The Way and Beanstalk Innovation. He is on the advisory board of Udacity, Inc., Viridis Learning, Inc. and the board of directors of Vocefy, Inc. and Webtab, Inc.

In 2017, Bennett launched a podcast, The Bill Bennett Show.

According to internal White House records from January 6, 2021, Bennett spoke on the phone with then-President Donald Trump just before Trump went to the "Save America" rally that preceded the attack on the Capitol.

=== Foreign Agent ===
On July 3, 2025, Bennett registered as a foreign agent with the U.S. Department of Justice under the Foreign Agents Registration Act (FARA), representing the interests of the State of Qatar. According to his filing, he is expected to disseminate information through newspapers, magazines, lectures, speeches, emails, press releases, letters, and telegrams, and to influence public officials, legislators, government agencies, editors, newspapers, and educational groups. His Exhibit B disclosure states he is compensated $30,000 per month for these services.

== Political views ==
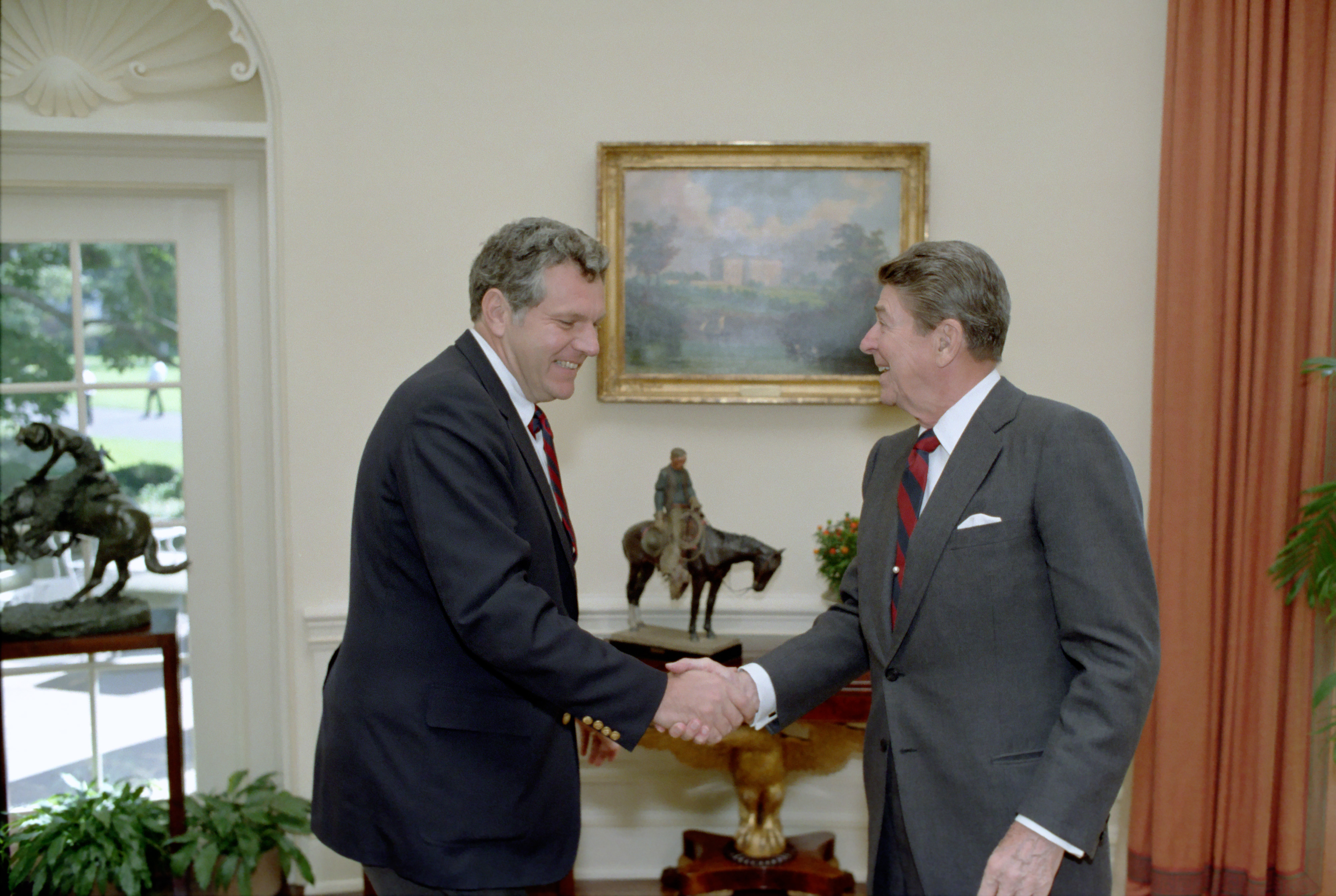
Bennett with President Ronald Reagan at the White House in 1987

Bennett tends to take a conservative position on affirmative action, school vouchers, curriculum reform, and religion in education. As education secretary, he asked colleges for stronger enforcement of drug laws and supported a classical education. He frequently criticized schools for low standards. In 1987 he called the Chicago Public Schools system "the worst in the nation." He coined the term "the blob" to describe the state education bureaucracy, a derogation which was later taken up in Britain by Michael Gove.

Bennett is a staunch supporter of the war on drugs and has been criticized for his views. On Larry King Live, he said that a viewer's suggestion of beheading drug dealers would be "morally plausible." He also "lamented that we still grant them [drug dealers] habeas corpus rights."

In May 1990, Bennett would publicly clash with Bart Simpson, suggesting that the Simpsons character was a bad influence on efforts to educate children about the dangers of drug abuse. However, amid Bart's rising popularity at the time, Bennett quickly attempted to patch things up, claiming that he had been "just kidding" in his criticism of Bart.

Bennett is a member of the Project for the New American Century (PNAC) and was one of the signers of the January 26, 1998 PNAC Letter sent to President Bill Clinton, which urged Clinton to remove Iraqi leader Saddam Hussein from power.

Bennett is a neoconservative, and was an advocate for the Iraq War.

In 2016, Bennett strongly supported Donald Trump in his presidential campaign, writing that conservatives who opposed Trump "suffer from a terrible case of moral superiority and put their own vanity and taste above the interest of the country" and that "our country can survive the occasional infelicities and improprieties of Donald Trump. But it cannot survive losing the Supreme Court to liberals."

== Controversies ==
=== Gambling ===
In 2003, it became publicly known that Bennett - who had spent years preaching about family values and personal responsibility - was a high-stakes gambler who lost millions of dollars in Las Vegas. Criticism increased in the wake of Bennett's publication, The Book of Virtues, a compilation of moral stories about courage, responsibility, friendship and other examples of virtue. Joshua Green of the Washington Monthly said that Bennett failed to denounce gambling because of his own tendency to gamble. Also, Bennett and Empower America, the organization he co-founded and headed at the time, opposed an extension of casino gambling in the United States.

Bennett said that his habit had not jeopardized himself or his family financially. After Bennett's gambling problem became public, he said he did not believe his habit set a good example, that he had "done too much gambling" over the years, and his "gambling days are over". "We are financially solvent," his wife Elayne told USA Today. "All our bills are paid." She added that his gambling days are over. "He's never going again," she said.

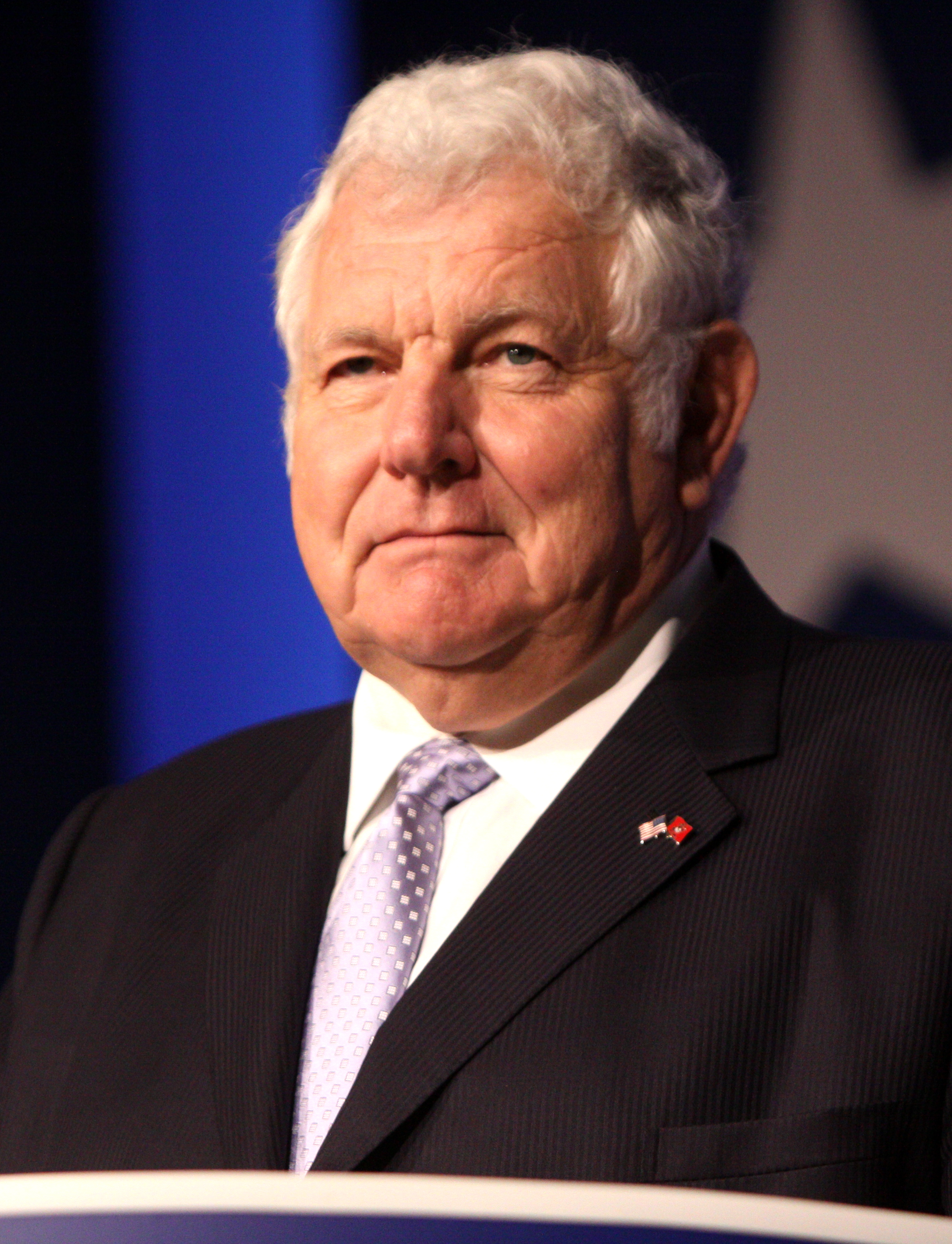
Bennett in 2011

Several months later, Bennett qualified his position, saying, "So, in this case, the excessive gambling is over." He explained, "Since there will be people doing the micrometer on me, I just want to be clear: I do want to be able to bet the Buffalo Bills in the Super Bowl."

=== Radio show abortion comment ===
On September 28, 2005, in a discussion on Bennett's Morning in America radio show, a caller to the show proposed that "lost revenue from the people who have been aborted in the last 30 years" could preserve Social Security if abortion had not been permitted since Roe v. Wade. Bennett responded by hypothesizing, "If you wanted to reduce crime, you could—if that were the sole purpose—you could abort every black baby in this country and the crime rate would go down. That would be an impossible, ridiculous, and morally reprehensible thing to do, but your crime rate would go down."

Bennett responded to critics of his statement by saying, in part:

A thought experiment about public policy, on national radio, should not have received the condemnations it has. Anyone paying attention to this debate should be offended by those who have selectively quoted me, distorted my meaning, and taken out of context the dialogue I engaged in this week. Such distortions from 'leaders' of organizations and parties is a disgrace not only to the organizations and institutions they serve, but to the First Amendment.

== Books ==
External videos
- Booknotes interview with Bennett on The Book of Virtues, January 9, 1994, C-SPAN

Bennett's best-known written work may be The Book of Virtues: A Treasury of Great Moral Stories (1993), which he edited; he has also authored and edited eleven other books, including The Children's Book of Virtues (which inspired an animated television series) and The Death of Outrage: Bill Clinton and the Assault on American Ideals (1998).

Other books:

- First Lessons. A Report on Elementary Education in America (co-authored in September 1986, as Secretary of the Department of Education)
- James Madison High School: A Curriculum For American Students (December 1987, as Secretary of the Department of Education)
- James Madison Elementary School: A Curriculum For American Students (August 1988, as Secretary of the Department of Education)
- The De-Valuing of America: The Fight for Our Culture and Our Children (1992)
- The Moral Compass: Stories for a Life's Journey (1995)
- Body Count: Moral Poverty ... and How to Win America's War Against Crime and Drugs (1996)
- Our Sacred Honor (1997, compilation of writings by the Founding Fathers)
- The Index of Leading Cultural Indicators (1999)
- The Educated Child: A Parent's Guide from Preschool through Eighth Grade (1999)
- The Broken Hearth: Reversing the Moral Collapse of the American Family (2001)
- Why We Fight: Moral Clarity and the War on Terrorism (2003)
- America: The Last Best Hope (Volume I): From the Age of Discovery to a World at War (2006)
- America: The Last Best Hope (Volume II): From a World at War to the Triumph of Freedom (2007)
- The American Patriot's Almanac: Daily Readings on America, with John Cribb (2008)
- The True Saint Nicholas (2009)
- A Century Turns: New Hopes, New Fears (2010)
- The Book of Man: Readings on the Path to Manhood (2011)
- The Fight of our Lives, co-authored with Seth Leibsohn (2011)
- Is College Worth It? with David Wilezol (2013)
- Going to Pot: Why the Rush to Legalize Marijuana Is Harming America, with Robert A. White (2015)
- Tried by Fire: The Story of Christianity's First Thousand Years (2016)

== Personal life ==
In 1967, as a graduate student in Austin, Texas, Bennett went on a single blind date with Janis Joplin. He later lamented, "That date lasted two hours, and I've spent 200 hours talking about it."

Bennett married Mary Elayne Glover in 1982. They have two sons, John and Joseph. Elayne is the president and founder of Best Friends Foundation, a national program promoting sexual abstinence among adolescents.

Bennett was the younger brother of the late Washington attorney Robert S. Bennett.

== See also ==
- Legalized abortion and crime effect
- List of U.S. political appointments that crossed party lines
- Race and crime in the United States
- Roe effect

Political offices
Preceded by Joseph Duffey	Chair of the National Endowment for the Humanities; 1981–1985	Succeeded by John Agresto; Acting
Preceded by Terrel Bell	United States Secretary of Education; 1985–1988	Succeeded by Lauro Cavazos
New office	Director of the Office of National Drug Control Policy; 1989–1990	Succeeded by Bob Martinez
U.S. order of precedence (ceremonial)
Preceded by Elizabeth Dole as Former U.S. Cabinet Member	Order of precedence of the United States as Former U.S. Cabinet Member	Succeeded by John S. Herrington as Former U.S. Cabinet Member
