= Canterbury University (disambiguation) =

Canterbury University may refer to:

- University of Canterbury, in Christchurch, Canterbury, New Zealand
- University of Kent at Canterbury, plateglass university in Canterbury, England (renamed "University of Kent")
- Canterbury Christ Church University, Anglican university in Canterbury, England
- Canterbury University (Seychelles), private degree-granting institution in Hyde-Cheshire, Manchester, United Kingdom
