= Christopher Perrin =

American publisher and educational consultant

- Born: 1961 (age 64–65)
- Occupations: Publisher; Writer; Educational Consultant
- Known for: Founding CEO of Classical Academic Press
- Spouse: Christine Perrin
- Website: https://christopherperrin.substack.com/

Christopher Perrin (born 1961) is a publisher, educator, speaker, and writer. He is the chief executive officer and cofounder of Classical Academic Press (a classical education curriculum, media, and consulting company started in 2001) and speaks at schools, conferences, and homeschool conventions. Perrin has written for The Gospel Coalition and National Review and been cited in Christianity Today. He heads the TrueNorth Podcast Network with The Christopher Perrin Show.

== Career and education ==
Perrin has a B.A. in history (with a classics minor) from the University of South Carolina as well as a Master of Arts in Liberal Arts from St. John's College and an M.Div and Ph.D. from Westminster Theological Seminary (writing his thesis on the apologetics of G. K. Chesterton).

Christopher Perrin became involved with the Classical education movement in 1996 as the founding headmaster (and Latin teacher) for a classical Christian school in Harrisburg, Pennsylvania (Covenant Christian Academy). He has served with the Society of Classical Learning (Board Vice-chair) and is currently President of the Alcuin Fellowship.

Writing An Introduction to Classical Education: A Guide for Parents in 2004, Perrin has also authored The Scholé Way (2024) and co-authored The Good Teacher along with Carrie Eben (2025). Perrin has also written curriculum: Greek For Children Primer A, the Greek Alphabet Code Cracker, and co-authorship of the Latin for Children series (for which he also recorded video instruction).

== Personal life ==
Christopher Perrin is married to poet, author, and college educator Christine Perrin. He and his wife have three children and live near Harrisburg, Pennsylvania.
