= Canterbury College =

Canterbury College may refer to:

- Canterbury College (Indiana), U.S.
- Canterbury College (Waterford), Queensland, Australia
- Canterbury College (Windsor, Ontario), Canada
- Canterbury College, Kent, England
- Canterbury College, Oxford, England
- Canterbury College of Business, Hyde, England
- Canterbury Girls' Secondary College, Victoria, Australia
- Canterbury University (Seychelles)
- University of Canterbury, New Zealand

== See also ==
- Canterbury (disambiguation)
