= The Children's Book of Virtues =

1995 anthology edited by William Bennett

- Editor: William Bennett
- Illustrator: Michael Hague
- Language: English
- Subject: Morality
- Genre: Anthology; Children's literature
- Publisher: Simon & Schuster
- Publication date: October 1995
- Publication place: United States
- Pages: 111
- ISBN: 0-684-81353-X

The Children's Book of Virtues is a 1995 anthology edited by conservative politician and commentator William Bennett and illustrated by Michael Hague. It collects 31 passages featured in the original Book of Virtues from 1993, and uses the original virtue list as the basis for four new sections. Bennett developed the follow-up amid concerns over the accessibility of the parent work towards younger readers, and teamed up with Hague, whom his wife recommended.

The Children's installment was published by Simon & Schuster in October 1995 to strong sales but mixed to negative reviews, and was accompanied by two other companion successors to the original; an animated follow-up, Adventures from the Book of Virtues, premiered on PBS in 1996. Hague would lend his talent to several more print installments until 2002. During a trademark infringement lawsuit, an unrelated company canceled a planned book of the same title in favor of Bennett's official work.

== Overview ==
A spin-off from 1993's The Book of Virtues, The Children's Book of Virtues collects 31 passages previously featured in the original. Selections from Aesop's Fables, Robert Frost, Frank Crane, and African and Native American folklore are represented in this volume; the legend of George Washington's cherry tree (as related to Mason Locke Weems) makes an encore appearance. The stories are grouped into four sections utilizing the same categories from its parent book, all of which compiler William Bennett says represent "the essentials of good character": courage/perseverance, responsibility/work/self-discipline, compassion/faith, and honesty/loyalty/friendship.

== Development ==
William Bennett developed The Children's Book of Virtues amid concerns that the original parent title was not as accessible to young readers. Feedback from parents who read the 1993 installment indicated that their children wanted pictures to accompany the stories. In response, Bennett's wife Elayne recommended children's illustrator Michael Hague for the task; she had previously read her children storybooks featuring his work.

== Release ==
The Children's Book of Virtues was part of a trio of 1995 successors to the original Book of Virtues, alongside companion installments The Moral Compass and The Book of Virtues for Young People. It was published that October by Simon & Schuster with an initial print run of 500,000 copies, a figure that increased to 1,013,000 after four printings by the following month, and debuted at #20 on USA Today's Best-Selling Books. An Audio Treasury edition, running 60 minutes on tape and 70 on CD, was released in December 1995 alongside the print version.

Early in its release, USA Today, The New York Times, and The Washington Post all listed it as a nonfiction title. The first two papers would later reclassify it as fictional (in line with the disclaimer on its copyright page), while The Washington Post sided with bookstores and kept it in their nonfiction category (akin to the 1993 book). The news of this chart crossover came as a welcome surprise to Simon & Schuster's trade-division president Carolyn K. Reidy.

== Reception ==
Response to The Children's Book of Virtues was mixed to negative. Kathy Canavan of Wilmington, Delaware's The News Journal observed its nostalgic flair and wrote that Hague's "retro-illustrations are a perfect fit for the classic tales." Jennifer L. Stevenson critiqued the collection with bookending rhymes in her review for The St. Petersburg Times, while also noting the limits of the selections' appeal to modern-day audiences ("For he's writing not for 1995, but 1899"). As Stevenson added:

Except for some carefully drawn illustrations that seem intent to include children of different races, this bland, boring book is a curiosity to an adult. To a youngster, it is a saccharine sweet abomination of mixed messages that might actually damage a child's sense of self-esteem rather than bolster it. A few tales are of moderate interest. Most are preachy and pompous — hardly the stuff for the pre-K set.

Sarah Nordgren of the Associated Press likewise doubted the appeal of the stories to 1990s readers and nitpicked their low diversity; she opined that its titular demographic "[has] more important things on their mind" than considering the collection. Laura Shapiro of Newsweek said that, with this volume, "Virtue has never seemed less appealing." While finding it "rather cumbersome", Shareem Amry of Malaysia's New Straits Times recommended it for parents, and wrote that Hague's work was "the real star of the whole project".

== Legal issues ==
In August 1995, weeks before the official Bennett follow-ups were published, Simon & Schuster sued Dove Entertainment for infringement on the Virtues trademark. Dove had released The Children's Audiobook of Virtues earlier that year, with plans for their own Children's Book of Virtues later on. As part of the suit, Dove withdrew the titles from the market; their decision was upheld in court when the infringement charges were confirmed, invoking the Lanham Act. By October, they were "ordered to pay S&S and Bennett all of [their] profits on the infringing audiobooks and to reimburse them for certain legal costs."

== Legacy ==
In 1996, the PBS animated series Adventures from the Book of Virtues followed in the wake of 1995's child-oriented Virtues spin-offs. Hague would go on to illustrate five more follow-up titles in Bennett's series: The Children's Book of Heroes (1997), The Children's Book of America (1998), The Children's Book of Faith (2000), The Children's Treasury of Virtues (2000), and The Children's Book of Home and Family (2002).
