= Classical Academic Press =

Classical education curriculum publisher

- Status: Active
- Founded: 2001
- Founders: Christopher Perrin, Greg Lowe, Joelle Hodge, Rob Baddorf, and Aaron Larson
- Country of origin: United States
- Headquarters location: Camp Hill, Pennsylvania, US
- Distribution: Worldwide
- Publication types: Curriculum, books, multimedia
- Nonfiction topics: Latin, Greek, Spanish, science, logic, writing, rhetoric, grammar, poetry, literature, history, Classical education
- Imprints: Novare Science
- Official website: classicalacademicpress.com

Classical Academic Press publishes books and K–12 curriculum (including Latin, Greek, Spanish, science, logic, writing, rhetoric, grammar, poetry, literature, history) with the motto, “Classical Subjects Creatively Taught.” The press started in 2001 as a privately owned publishing company with multiple partners, including CEO and cofounder Christopher Perrin, to develop and publish classical curricula and media. The press is recognized as a leading provider of independent and public charter schools as well as homeschools influenced by the renewal of classical education and classical Christian education.

== Publications ==
Classical Academic Press published four of the works cited by Jessica L. Richardi's literature review on the topic of K-12 classical education for Educational Innovations and Emerging Technologies. In addition to student texts and resources, the press publishes books such as The Liberal Arts Tradition: A Philosophy of Classical Christian Education by Kevin Clark and Ravi Jain with a foreword by Peter Kreeft (2021, 3rd edition), The Myth Made Fact: Reading Greek and Roman Mythology through Christian Eyes by Louis Markos (2020), and The Black Intellectual Tradition: Reading Freedom in Classical Literature by Angel Adams Parham and Anika Prather (2022).

== Imprints and other services ==
In 2020, Classical Academic Press acquired Novare Science & Math from John Mays and has continued development of its curriculum under the Novare Science imprint.

Classical Academic Press also offers live online classes for students in grades 3 to 6 through Scholé Academy, online teacher training courses through ClassicalU.com, support to local homeschool co-ops and hybrid model schools through the Scholé Communities network, and hosts multiple shows on the TrueNorth Podcast Network.
