= Classical education movement =

Renewal of a traditional liberal arts education

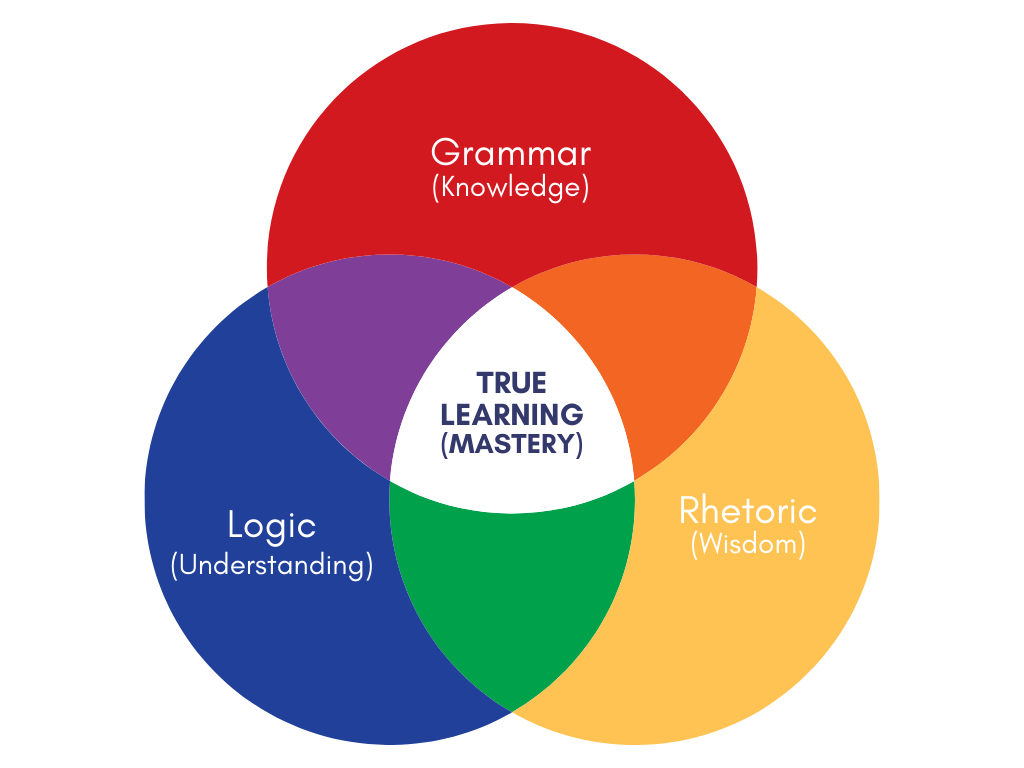
- A visualization of the trivium
- Description: Revived interest among groups of independent, charter, and home schools in a liberal and liberal arts education centered on a canon of classic works
- Varieties and Influences: Association of Classical and Christian Schools, St. John's College, Mortimer J. Adler

The classical education movement or renewal advocates for a return to a traditional European education based on the liberal arts (including the natural sciences), the Western canons of classical literature, the fine arts, and the history of Western civilization. It focuses on human formation and paideia with an early emphasis on music, gymnastics, recitation, imitation, and grammar. Multiple organizations support classical education in charter schools, in independent faith-based schools, and in home education. This movement has inspired several graduate programs and colleges as well as a new peer-reviewed journal, Principia: A Journal of Classical Education.

== Renewal starting in 1979 ==
The term classical education has been used in Western cultures for several centuries, with each era modifying the definition and adding its own selection of topics. By the end of the 18th century, in addition to the trivium and quadrivium of the Middle Ages, the definition of a classical education embraced study of literature, poetry, drama, philosophy, history, art, and languages.

In the 20th and 21st centuries, the term classical education has been used to refer to a broad-based study of the liberal arts and sciences, in contrast to a practical or pre-professional program. The current renewal started with four schools founded in 1979 to 1982: Trivium School (Lancaster, Massachusetts), Cair Paravel-Latin School (Topeka, Kansas), Trinity School at Greenlawn (South Bend, Indiana), and Logos School (Moscow, Idaho). Since the 1980s, according to Andrew Kern, the classical education movement has "swept" America.

In a May 12, 2023 opinion piece for The Wall Street Journal, Cornel West and Jeremy Tate (founder of the Classic Learning Test) praised the boost given to the classical-education movement by Florida governor Ron DeSantis. On her May 4, 2023 episode of First Person, The New York Times journalist Lulu Garcia-Navarro interviewed Jeremy Tate. Emma Green, writing for The New Yorker in April 2023, reports that what governor Ron DeSantis considers to be "a model for education nationwide" is an educational philosophy developed by Hillsdale College "as part of a larger movement to restore 'classical education'—a liberal-arts curriculum designed to cultivate wisdom and teach children to pursue the ancient ideals of truth, beauty, and goodness."

Also in April 2023, Angel Adams Parham (sociology professor and senior fellow at the Institute for Advanced Studies in Culture at the University of Virginia) and Anika Prather (director of high-quality curriculum and instruction at the Johns Hopkins Institute for Education Policy) wrote an article in The Washington Post entitled "As Black educators, we endorse classical studies" and argued that "rooted in the fullness of this history, classical education invites us and our students to learn from this rich crossroads and to enter into a millennia-long conversation about what it means to be human, the essence of freedom, how to live well and what constitutes a good society". This movement has also been mentioned in stories by Louis Markos in Christianity Today (2019) and Stanley Fish in The New York Times (2010) as well as by others in the Carolina Journal.

Several new organizations and publishers have emerged in support of the growing classical education movement, including Veritas Press, Classical Academic Press (cofounded by Christopher Perrin), Memoria Press, Canon Press, the Circe Institute, Association of Classical Christian Schools, Society for Classical Learning, the Institute for Classical Education, the Classic Learning Test, the Institute for Catholic Liberal Education, and Classical Historian.

A number of informal groups and professional organizations have led the classical education movement in the past century. Within the secular classical movement, Mortimer Adler and Robert Hutchins set forth the "Great Books" of Western civilization as the center stage for a classical education curriculum in the 1930s. Some public schools (primarily charters) have structured their curricula and pedagogy around the trivium and integrate the teaching of values (sometimes called "character education") into the mainstream classroom.

== Theory of classical education ==
The classical education movement has borrowed terms used in educational history to name three phases of education.

- "Primary education" teaches students how to learn.
- "Secondary education" then teaches a conceptual framework that can hold all human knowledge (history), fills in basic facts and practices of major fields of knowledge, and develops the fundamental skills of every major human activity.
- "Tertiary education" then prepares a person to pursue an educated profession such as law, theology, military strategy, medicine, or science.

=== Primary education – the trivium ===
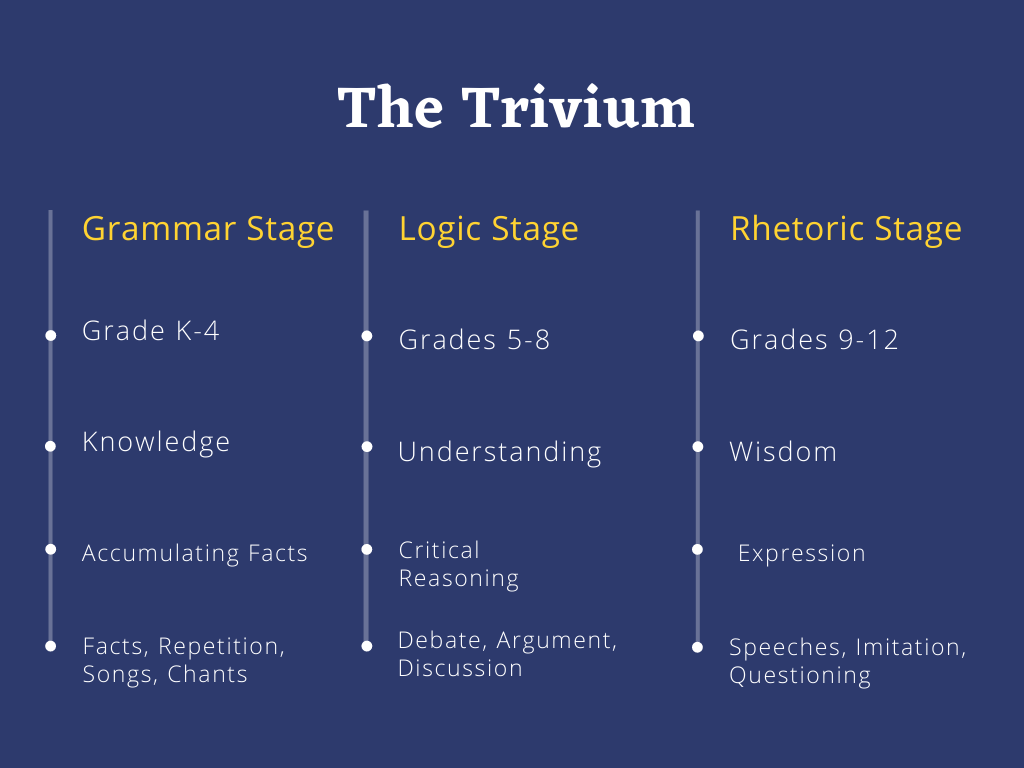
An explanation of the trivium paradigm according to Sayers.

Primary education is divided into three stages using terms introduced by Dorothy Sayers in her essay The Lost Tools of Learning: "poll-parrot", "pert", and "poetic". According to Sayers, these phases are roughly coordinated with human development and would ideally be coordinated with each individual student's development.

Sayers connects her three stages with the three liberal language arts (trivium): grammar, logic, and rhetoric, respectively. While grammar, logic, and rhetoric are taught as subjects in classical schools, many schools also use these three arts as a paradigm for child development.

Logic and rhetoric were often taught in part by the Socratic method, in which the teacher raises questions and the class discusses them. By controlling the pace, the teacher can keep the class very lively, yet disciplined.

==== Grammar ====
Grammar consists of language skills such as reading and the mechanics of writing. An important goal of grammar is to acquire as many words and manage as many concepts as possible so as to be able to express and understand clearly concepts of varying degrees of complexity. Classical education traditionally included study of Latin and Greek to reinforce understanding of the workings of languages and allow students to read the classics of Western civilization untranslated.

==== Logic ====
Logic is the process of correct reasoning. The traditional text for teaching logic was Aristotle's Organon. In the modern renaissance of classical education, this logic stage (or dialectic stage) refers to the junior high or middle school aged student, who developmentally is beginning to question ideas and authority, and truly enjoys a debate or an argument. Training in logic, both formal and informal, enables students to critically examine arguments and to analyze their own. The goal of the logic stage is to train the student's mind not only to grasp information, but to find the analytical connections between seemingly different facts/ideas, to find out why something is true, or why something else is false.

==== Rhetoric ====
Rhetorical debate and composition are taught to somewhat older (often high-school-aged) students, who by this point in their education have the concepts and logic to criticize their own work and persuade others. According to Aristotle, "Rhetoric is the counterpart of dialectic", concerned with finding "all the available means of persuasion". Students learn to articulate answers to important questions in their own words, to try to persuade others with these facts, and to defend ideas against rebuttal. The student learns to reason correctly in the Logic stage so that they can now apply those skills to Rhetoric. Traditionally, students would read and emulate classical poets in learning how to present their arguments well.

=== Secondary education – the quadrivium ===
Secondary education, classically the quadrivium or "four ways", consists of arithmetic, geometry, music, and astronomy. Sometimes architecture is taught alongside these, often from the works of Vitruvius. History is taught to provide a context and show political and military development. The classic texts were from ancient authors such as Herodotus, Thucydides, Livy, Cicero, and Tacitus. Biographies were often assigned as well, with the classic example being Plutarch's Lives. Biographies help show how persons behave in their context, and the wide ranges of professions and options that exist. As more modern texts became available, these were often added to the curriculum.

These are taught in a matrix of history, reviewing the natural development of each field for each phase of the trivium. That is, in a perfect classical education, the historical study is reviewed three times: first to learn the grammar (the concepts, terms and skills in the order developed), next time the logic (how these elements could be assembled), and finally the rhetoric, how to produce good, humanly useful and beautiful objects that satisfy the grammar and logic of the field. History is the unifying conceptual framework, because history is the study of everything that has occurred before the present.

Classical educators consider the Socratic method to be the best technique for teaching critical thinking. In-class discussion and critiques are essential for students to recognize and internalize critical thinking techniques. This method is widely used to teach both philosophy and law. It is currently rare in other contexts. Essentially, the teacher referees the students' discussions, asks leading questions, and may refer to facts, but never gives a conclusion until at least one student reaches that conclusion. The learning is most effective when the students compete strongly, even viciously in the argument, but always according to well-accepted rules of correct reasoning. That is, fallacies should not be allowed by the teacher.

By completing a project in each major field of human effort, the student can develop a personal preference for further education and professional training.

=== Tertiary education – the apprenticeship ===
Historically, tertiary education was usually an apprenticeship to a person with the desired profession. Most often, the understudy was called a "secretary" and had the duty of carrying on all the normal business of the "master." Philosophy and theology were both widely taught as tertiary subjects in universities, however.

The early biographies of nobles show what is possibly the ultimate form of classical education: a tutor. One early, much-emulated classic example of this tutor system is that of Alexander the Great, who was tutored by Aristotle.

== Prevalence ==
Over 500 classical Christian schools are members of the Association of Classical Christian Schools. There are also hundreds of public charter classical schools including networks such as the Barney Charter School Initiative and Great Hearts Academies. Nyansa Classical Community also provides after-school programs. Almost 200 classical Catholic schools are part of the Institute for Catholic Liberal Education. The U.S. has many classical homeschooling communities, with more than 1000 communities that are part of Classical Conversations, and more than 100 that are part of the Scholé Communities network. The movement has inspired several graduate programs.

== Interpretations of classical education ==
=== Classical education in schools ===
A number of classical schools have been established within the public/secular sector. These schools, primarily founded as charter schools, also structure their curricula and pedagogy around the trivium and integrate the teaching of values (sometimes called "character education") into the mainstream classroom with or without involving any particular religious perspectives.

The Well-Trained Mind: A Guide to the Classical Education You Never Had, by Susan Wise Bauer, is a modern reference on classical education. It provides a history of classical education, an overview of the methodology and philosophy of classical education, and annotated lists of books divided by grade and topic that list the best books for classical education in each category.

Another important book summarizing the history and philosophy of classical education is the Liberal Arts Tradition: A Philosophy of Christian Classical Education by Kevin Clark and Ravi Jain. Written by two veteran teachers from a classical school in Orlando, Florida, the book describes the ways in which the classical curriculum of the liberal arts developed and was deployed throughout the centuries. The authors present an overview of the classical liberals using the paradigm of piety, gymnastic, music, the seven liberal arts, philosophy, and theology using the acrostic PGMAPT.

Mortimer Adler and Robert Hutchins, both of the University of Chicago set forth in the 1930s to restore the "Great Books" of Western civilization to center stage in the curriculum. Adler and Hutchins sought to expand on the standard "classics" by including more modern works and trying to tie them together in the context of what they described as the "Great Ideas", in their book Great Books of the Western World. They were wildly popular during the 1950s, and discussion groups of aficionados were found all over the US. However, their popularity waned during the 1960s, and such groups are relatively hard to find today. Extensions to the original set are still being published, encompassing selections from both current and older works which extend the "great ideas" into the present age.

=== Classical Christian education ===
Classical Christian education is a learning approach popularized in the late 20th century that emphasizes biblical teachings and incorporates a teaching model from the classical education movement known as the Trivium, consisting of three parts: grammar, logic, and rhetoric. It is taught internationally in hundreds of schools with about 40,000 students, as of 2024.

According to Douglas Wilson this method of instruction was developed by early Christians as part of the Seven Liberal Arts. Wilson's writings and the Logos School he founded have been cited as being influential in reviving the Trivium and fueling a modern educational movement, primarily among American Protestants. Classical Christian education is characterized by a reliance on classical works by authors such as Homer, Democritus, Sophocles, Plato, Plotinus, Josephus, Dante, Pythagoras and Shakespeare, and an integration of a Christian worldview into all subjects. In addition, classical Christian education exposes students to Western civilization's history, art and culture, teaching Latin as early as the second grade and often offering several years of Greek.

==== Philosophy ====
The modern Classical-Christian educational movement has its roots in the mid to late twentieth century. Its popularity was fueled by the publication in 1991 of a book entitled Recovering the Lost Tools of Learning by Doug Wilson. In it he expanded on a paper titled "The Lost Tools of Learning" written by Dorothy Sayers. She lamented that the “great defect of our education" was that schools taught information, but did not teach students how to think. Wilson described an educational model based on the child's developmental capabilities and natural inclinations.

- From birth, the child learns language and about itself.
- From about age 2 to age 4, the child develops social skills and gains mobility and dexterity.
- The Grammar stage begins around age 5. In this stage, the child is in a "parrot" stage of repeating what they are told. This phase sees them enjoying simple songs over and over, so songs, rhymes and memory aid teach the basics of reading, writing, numbers and math, and observational science. Many schools begin Latin language training in 3rd grade. Some schools will also teach a Christian Catechism while students are in this phase, as foundation for intensive study of the texts and structures of the Bible.
- The Logic stage begins in 6th grade. At this age, students naturally develop an argumentative behavior, and are equipped with tools of logic and how to formulate a defense for an idea. This provides the foundation for Sayers' 'teaching them to think' model.

In addition to Logic, classically educated children read the classics of literature and learn to ask questions about why something exists. Memorization of facts occurs, but it is more likely for students to be taught how something works. Explanation is more valued than blind memorization.

- The Rhetoric phase happens during high school, blending the prior learning with specialized knowledge, generally in a college preparatory curriculum.

The classical Christian education movement has also been influenced by Norms and Nobility by David V. Hicks as well as the CiRCE Institute founded by Andrew Kern, which exists to promote classical Christian education. In 2016, Kevin Clark and Ravi Jain authored The Liberal Arts Tradition, published by Classical Academic Press which was later revised in 2019, with a foreword by Peter Kreeft. This work was widely endorsed as an essential explanation of the philosophy of classical Christian education by over 14 leaders within the movement, including John Frame, Andrew Kern, Phillip J. Donnelly (Baylor Honors College), and David Goodwin, President of the Association of Classical Christian Schools.

Anglican schools in North America have increasingly adopted the classical education model, integrating Anglican liturgy, catechesis, and sacramental theology into a traditional liberal arts framework—an approach championed in the 20th century by figures such as Dorothy Sayers and C.S. Lewis. According to the Anglican Schools Association, classical Anglican education is expanding among independent parochial schools, with the association currently representing 16 member schools across North America. One such example is Canterbury Christian School in Los Altos, California, which combines a classical liberal arts curriculum with the daily office of the Anglican Book of Common Prayer.

== See also ==
- Christian views on the classics
- Education reform
- Western education
