= Covenant Christian Academy (Harrisburg, Pennsylvania) =

Location
- 1982 Locust Lane; Harrisburg, Pennsylvania 17109; United States; 40°17′22″N 76°51′36″W

Information
- Type: Christian
- Established: 1997
- Headmaster: David Sonju
- Teaching staff: 23.6 (FTE)
- Grades: PreK–12
- Enrollment: 225 (2013-2014)
- Student to teacher ratio: 9.4
- Website: discovercovenant.com

Covenant Christian Academy (CCA) is a private PreK–12 Christian school founded in 1997 by parents interested in giving their children a Classical Christian education based on the medieval model of the trivium. It is located in Harrisburg, Pennsylvania.
