= Louis Markos =

American professor and christian apologist

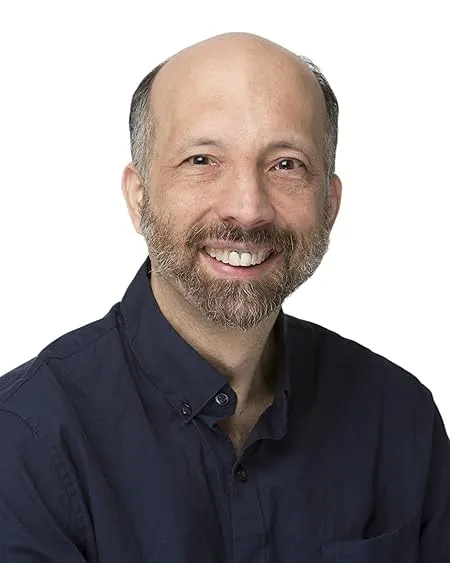
- Markos in 2025
- Education: Colgate University (BA); University of Michigan (MA), (PhD)
- Occupations: Professor; Christian apologist
- Spouse: Donna
- Children: 2

Louis Markos is an American professor and Christian apologist. He is a professor in English at Houston Christian University, where he holds the Robert H. Ray Chair in Humanities.

== Education ==
Markos earned his B.A. in English and History from Colgate University and his M.A. and Ph.D. in English from the University of Michigan. While at the University of Michigan, he specialized in British Romantic Poetry, Literary Theory, and the Classics. As part of his studies, Markos wrote a thesis on the work of William Wordsworth.

== Career ==
At Houston Christian University (where he has taught since 1991), Markos offers courses in poetry, including Victorian Poetry and Prose, 17th-century Poetry and Prose, Mythology, Epic and Film. He also teaches classes on Ancient Greece and Rome for HBU’s Honors College along with courses on C. S. Lewis, J. R. R. Tolkien and the Classics.

He is a member of Phi Beta Kappa and won Outstanding Teaching Assistant Award at the University of Michigan and was named the Opal Goolsby Teacher of the Year at the Houston Baptist University. In 1994, he was selected to attend an NEH Summer Institute on Virgil’s Aeneid. In addition to presenting several papers at scholarly conferences, Dr. Markos has become a popular speaker in Houston, Texas, where he has presented five lectures at the Museum of Printing History Lyceum (three on film, two on ancient Greece), a three-lecture series on film at the Houston Public Library, a class on film for Leisure Learning Unlimited, a class on the Odyssey for a retirement center and a lecture on Homer and the Oral Tradition for a seniors group. He has produced two lecture series with the Teaching Company ("The Life and Writings of C. S. Lewis"; "Plato to Postmodernism: Understanding the Essence of Literature and the Role of the Author") and has also published articles and reviews in journals including Christianity Today, Touchstone, Theology Today, Christian Research Journal, Mythlore, Christian Scholar’s Review, Saint Austin Review, American Arts Quarterly, and The City.

== Personal life ==
Markos lives in Houston, Texas, with his wife, Donna, his son and daughter.

== Scholarly works ==
- Markos, Louis (2003). Lewis Agonistes: How C. S. Lewis can Train us to Wrestle with the Modern and Postmodern World. Broadman & Holman Publishers. ISBN 978-0805427783.
- Markos, Louis (2007). Pressing Forward: Alfred, Lord Tennyson and the Victorian Age. Notre Dame, Indiana: Ave Maria Press. ISBN 978-1932589368.
- Markos, Louis (2011). The Eye of the Beholder: How to See the World like a Romantic Poet. Hamden, Connecticut: Winged Lion Press. ISBN 978-1936294015.
- Markos, Louis (2012). From Achilles to Christ: Why Christians Should Read the Pagan Classics. Westmont, Illinois: Read How You Want. ISBN 978-1458726797.
- Markos, Louis (2010). Restoring Beauty: The Good, the True, and the Beautiful in the Writings of C.S. Lewis. Milton Keynes: Authentic Media. ISBN 978-1606570982.
- Markos, Louis (2010). Apologetics for the Twenty-First Century. Wheaton, Illinois: Crossway. ISBN 978-1433514487.
- Markos, Louis (2012). On the Shoulders of Hobbits: The Road to Virtue in Tolkien and Lewis. Chicago, Illinois: Moody Publishers. ISBN 978-0802443199.
- Markos, Louis (2013). Heaven and Hell: Visions of the Afterlife in the Western Poetic Tradition. Eugene, Oregon: Cascade Books. ISBN 978-1498216357.
- Markos, Louis (2018). Atheism on Trial: Refuting the Modern Arguments Against God. Eugene, Oregon: Harvest House Publishers. ISBN 978-0736973076.
- Markos, Louis (2021). The Myth Made Fact: Reading Greek and Roman Mythology through Christian Eyes. Camp Hill, Pennsylvania: Classical Academic Press. ISBN 978-1600514548.
- Markos, Louis (2021). From Plato to Christ: How Platonic Thought Shaped Christian Faith. Westmont, Illinois: InterVarsity Press. ISBN 978-0830853045.
- Markos, Louis (2022). C.S. Lewis for Beginners. Danbury, Connecticut: For Beginners. ISBN 978-1939994806.

== Plays ==
Markos has had his modern adaptation of Euripides’ Iphigenia in Tauris performed off-Broadway in the Fall of 2011 and adaptations of Euripides’ Helen and Sophocles’ Oedipus were performed in 2012. He is also the co-author of a script on C. S. Lewis and J. R. R. Tolkien, "The Lion Awakes".
