= The Book of Virtues =

1993 anthology edited by William Bennett

The Book of Virtues: A Treasury of Great Moral Stories
- Editor: William Bennett
- Cover artist: Mark Summers
- Language: English
- Subject: Morality
- Genre: Anthology
- Publisher: Simon & Schuster
- Publication date: November 1993
- Publication place: United States
- Pages: 831
- ISBN: 0-684-83577-0

The Book of Virtues (subtitled A Treasury of Great Moral Stories) is a 1993 anthology edited by William Bennett. It consists of 370 passages across ten chapters devoted to a different virtue, each of the latter escalating in complexity as they progress. Included in its pages are selections from ancient and modern sources, ranging from the Bible, Greek mythology, Aesop's Fables, William Shakespeare, and the Brothers Grimm, to later authors such as Hilaire Belloc, Charles Dickens, F. Scott Fitzgerald, Robert Frost, and Oscar Wilde.

A former Secretary of Education for the United States, Bennett began developing the book around 1988 at the behest of teachers who pointed out what they viewed as the deficiencies of moral education in their schools. Work on the project was paused during his tenure as director of the Office of National Drug Control Policy, and resumed by 1990 after he turned down an offer to lead the Republican National Convention. With the help of his friend and speechwriter John Cribb, Bennett gathered a wide range of passages for the collection, envisioning it as a modern-day version of the McGuffey's Readers.

The Book of Virtues was published in November 1993 by Simon & Schuster, receiving 40,000 copies in its first printing. Despite the publisher's initial lack of faith and advertising, concerns from industry skeptics, and mixed reviews for both its content and Bennett's own contributions, it became a New York Times Best Seller for more than 80 weeks (peaking at No. 1 in January 1994), and sold up to three million within six months in print.

Though Bennett intended Virtues as a one-off title, audience demand and feedback encouraged him to follow it up in 1995 with The Moral Compass: Stories for a Life's Journey and two spin-offs for younger readers. The following year, it was adapted as the PBS animated series Adventures from the Book of Virtues. The franchise spawned various merchandise by the start of the 2000s, continued in print until 2008, and inspired an array of conservative, liberal, and Christian-focused alternatives as well as a parody; a competitor's answer to the official spin-offs was also the focus of a 1995–1997 trademark-infringement lawsuit. A 30th-anniversary edition, which kept the virtue list intact and updated the contents, was published in 2022.

== Overview ==
Intended for the moral education of the young, The Book of Virtues collects 370 passages of various types and provenance across ten chapters, each of the latter devoted to a specific virtue: self-discipline, compassion, responsibility, friendship, work, courage, perseverance, honesty, loyalty, and faith. The chapters begin with simple texts, and escalate in complexity as they progress; compiler William Bennett provides two pages of opening commentary for each virtue, and a short introductory note for the individual selections. Bennett advises that his anthology should not be "read from cover to cover", but instead be used for browsing and bookmarking. According to John Allen Paulos of The New York Times Book Review, "Many of the stories are adaptations of the originals, a few are from non-Western sources, and most are only a few pages long." Public-domain material comprises an estimated 85% of Bennett's collection, which also surveys three thousand years of literature; one of the most recent selections, "Instant Hero", first appeared as a January 1982 Washington Post story.

The anthology opens with an extract from Plato's Republic:

You know that the beginning is the most important part of any work, especially in the case of a young and tender thing: for that is the time at which the character is being formed and the desired impression is readily taken .... Shall we just carelessly allow children to hear any casual tales which may be devised by casual persons, and to receive into their minds ideas for the most part the very opposite of those which we should wish them to have when they are grown up?

Notable stories told or excerpted in this collection include:

- "The Steadfast Tin Soldier" by Hans Christian Andersen, cited as a "favorite of the Bennett family"
- The Adventures of Pinocchio by Carlo Collodi
- A Christmas Carol by Charles Dickens
- Hans Brinker, or The Silver Skates by Mary Mapes Dodge
- The English fairy tale "Jack and the Beanstalk"
- "How Much Land Does a Man Need?" by Leo Tolstoy
- The Velveteen Rabbit by Margery Williams
- "The Little Engine That Could", attributed to Rev. Charles S. Wing

The Greek myth of Daedalus and Icarus, and the legends of Robin Hood and Little John, William Tell, and George Washington's cherry tree (as related to Mason Locke Weems) also appear in the book. Four poems by Robert Frost – "The Pasture", "A Time to Talk", "Mending Wall", and "The Road Not Taken" – are reproduced therein. George Washington's Farewell Address, as printed in the book, omits the final segment mentioning "the insidious wiles of foreign influence" and "the need to steer clear of permanent alliances with any portion of the foreign world". The shortest passage in the collection is Ernest Shackleton's apocryphal, early-1910s recruitment ad for Antarctic-expedition members:

MEN WANTED FOR HAZARDOUS JOURNEY
Small wages, bitter cold, long months of complete darkness,
constant danger, safe return doubtful.
Honor and recognition in case of success.

Also featured are selections from the Bible, Aesop's Fables, African and Native American folklore, and Grimms' Fairy Tales; the works of Hilaire Belloc, Willa Cather, F. Scott Fitzgerald, Rudyard Kipling, Henry Wadsworth Longfellow, Theodore Roosevelt, Babe Ruth, William Shakespeare, and Oscar Wilde (among many others) are represented as well. The original release contained biographies on Susan B. Anthony, Rosa Parks, Anne Sullivan, and Harriet Tubman, while the 30th anniversary edition from 2022 profiled Mother Teresa, Navy SEAL Michael P. Murphy, and honorees from the September 11 attacks of 2001. The flap at the back cover contains a photo of Bennett, his wife Elayne, and their two sons.

== Development ==
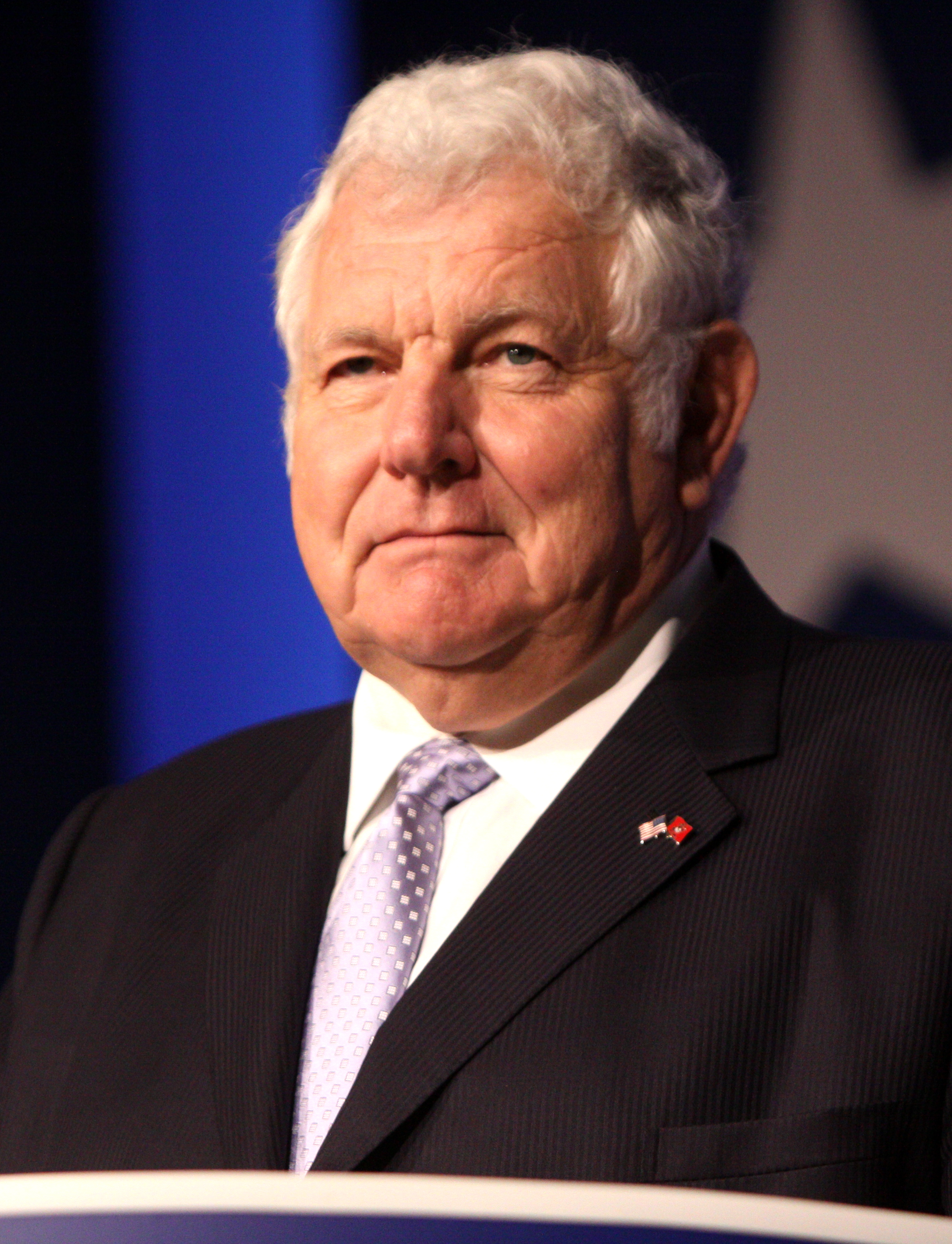
William Bennett (2011; age 68) developed The Book of Virtues over a five-year period.

William Bennett had served as Secretary of Education for President Ronald Reagan and often made school trips during his tenure. According to Bennett, The Book of Virtues grew out of conversations with teachers, who expressed difficulty in communicating common moral principles to diverse student bodies; as such, he originally intended the collection to be used by teachers. Bennett, who worked on the collection as a "labor of love" and "for purely personal reasons", set out to write a McGuffey's Reader for the 1990s (as proposed to his publisher Simon & Schuster), and despite the presence of writings from political figures, vowed to downplay any political undertones in it. The anthology was part of a two-title, $187,000 contract with the publisher, along with The De-Valuing of America. (Note: Both titles were reviewed in Perkins 1994 (Christianity Today).)

Bennett equally aimed his collection at children and adults alike.

As he wrote in his introduction: "[It] does not discuss issues like nuclear war, abortion, creationism, or euthanasia. This may come as a disappointment to some."

He told Publishers Weekly, in October 1995, that while preparing Virtues: "I decided to take a close look at some of the books American children were reading at their homes and schools around the turn of the 20th century. This is when the country had a clear view of the education of the young in this direction."

Around 1988, Bennett began work on Virtues and De-Valuing after his tenure as Secretary wound down, although that work entered a hiatus during his subsequent stint as director of the Office of National Drug Control Policy (a position nicknamed the "Drug Czar"). When he was called to replace Lee Atwater as head of the Republican National Committee in 1990, he turned down the offer for the sake of paying back his book-contract money. Soon afterward, Bennett went through his literature collection to select the stories, poems, and other literary accounts that would become part of Virtues. He enlisted the help of John Cribb, a friend of his and a former speech writer for the Education Department, to compile the work; Cribb "arranged to be paid in a percentage of royalties" for his involvement. After struggling to find a different publisher, Cribb and Bennett turned to Simon & Schuster to release the anthology, but with only US$5,000 in advance fees for that title this time around.

== Release ==
The Book of Virtues was mentioned as early as a May 1993 Chicago Tribune story on Bennett, and was published in November 1993 by Simon & Schuster. A four-tape audiobook edition, released the following September, featured readings by the compiler and guest stars including Michael York and Dana Ivey; in this rendition, Charlton Heston recited "The Ten Commandments" from Exodus. In early January 1994, Bennett appeared on C-SPAN's Booknotes to discuss the collection; some time later, California's Republican Senate candidate Michael Huffington promoted and praised it in one of his campaign television commercials. Overseas, a Latin American Spanish version (El libro de las virtudes) was issued by Argentina's Javier Vergara in 1995, as well as an Australian edition from Bookman Press. A 30th anniversary edition, published in 2022, kept the virtue list intact; removed several sections from the original; and added new material comprising 33% of the updated text.

== Reception ==
=== Sales ===
"[Before its publication, Bennett recalled,] skeptics in the publishing industry predicted, 'No sex, no pictures – it won't sell.'"

— Kathryn Bold, Los Angeles Times

Virtues debuted at #13 on The New York Times Best Seller List (Nonfiction) for December 26, 1993. It secured the #1 spot during its fourth week (on January 16, 1994), and remained on the chart for 88 consecutive weeks by late 1995, the 30th-longest run as of 2014. When it reached #1, the second rank on the list belonged to Howard Stern's Private Parts, a fact that did not go unnoticed by The Washington Post's E. J. Dionne. Bennett's accomplishment, in Dionne's opinion, "suggests that beneath our fascination with the prurient, the tasteless and the outrageous lies a yearning for something better – especially for our kids."

After an initial run of 40,000 copies (amid low expectations on the publisher's part and lack of advertising), The Book of Virtues sold 94,719 during Christmas week in 1993. Benefitting from word of mouth, this figure rose to more than 500,000 by late February 1994 (after 14 printings spanning 635,000 copies), and then 1.9–3 million within six months in print, (Note: Different sales figures were reported elsewhere across different timepoints; for instance, Abate 2010, p. 46 says "more than two million copies by October 1995".) helping it become one of the bestselling titles of the 1990s and a surprise hit for Simon & Schuster. The Los Angeles Times declared it "one of the most unlikely in years", while the Washingtonian magazine (quoted in the Fort Lauderdale Sun Sentinel) observed its outreach's transcendence over political and religious lines, and its competition with Hollywood biographies, New Age guides, and financial books. During its first two years of release, the anthology quickly became a staple of elementary-school curricula.

In light of its success, Bennett told a benefit audience in May 1995, "Last month I outsold Howard Stern 8 to 1, and Roseanne 5 to 1. That tells me American people are interested in serious things." With earnings from the title estimated at $5 million, he purchased a North Carolina residence he dubbed as "the beach house virtue built". By his own estimates, he also stood to collect $50,000 in annual royalties. According to Rolling Stone, Bennett became a "one-man empire" with his Virtues series, a perspective that would later be concurred during the run of its animated adaptation. Still, with the first installment having reached less than 1% of the U.S. population by November of the previous year, he hoped for another organization to distribute it royalty-free for wider readership.

=== Reviews ===
"I know that some of these stories will strike some contemporary sensibilities as too simple, too corny, too old-fashioned. But they will not seem so to the child, especially if he or she has never seen them before. And I believe that if adults take this book and read it in a quiet place, alone, away from distorting standards, they will find themselves enjoying some of this old, simple, 'corny' stuff. The stories we adults used to know and forgot – or the stories we never did know but perhaps were supposed to know – are here."

— From Bennett's introduction, anticipating the critical analysis of his own work

From the time of its original publication, response to The Book of Virtues was mixed. In January 1994, The Washington Post carried two separate reviews by Laura Sessions Stepp and E. J. Dionne. While commending Bennett on leaving out the more serious issues stated in his introduction, Sessions Stepp was otherwise critical. "Several flaws," she said, "limit its appeal. One serious weakness is that despite its heft, The Book of Virtues is far too narrow, drawing almost exclusively from classical Western sources. This is a primer that reflects the philosophy of [students] in a Catholic boys' school." Dionne was more favorable: "[W]hile some will not agree with all of Bennett's selections, it's hard to quibble with the 10 virtues around which he organizes his book... [I]n preaching the virtues, he is speaking not just to 'the underclass,' but also to the middle class and to those whom Jesse Jackson refers to as 'the overclass.'"

Among critics from other mainstream outlets, David Brooks of The Wall Street Journal remarked, "There is too much stuff here that would appeal to the sort of kid who would exist if kids were designed by adults – and not very fun adults either ... [However], children can have a great time reading these tales, so long as they don't discover that it's supposed to be good for them." "[Though] well stocked with inspirational writings," said the NYT Book Review's John Allen Paulos, "the organizational principle is [unfortunately] weak." Entertainment Weekly's Lisa Schwarzbaum gave it a C− grade and declared it "a textbook of Trad Value Lit [with] pursed and hectoring subtext ... [a] sobersided publication representative of a current strain of humorless conservatism in inspirational teaching." Barbara Hall of The Baltimore Sun was more positive, saying, "[Within its pages,] there are so many terrific discoveries and re-discoveries here that it's difficult to pick favorites ... It is a formidable work by an editor who will be reckoned with now and for generations to come." Talk-show host Larry King called it "very readable and very important".

Time magazine declared that Virtues "ought to be distributed, like an owner's manual, to new parents leaving the hospital." Digby Anderson wrote in the National Review, "Mr. Bennett has created a treasury no conservative parent would want to be without." The collection was reviewed twice by Human Events magazine: one contributor listed it among the "best conservative books" of its year, and another called it "a culture capsule that if unearthed thousands of years from now could explain the values that have not only made America great, but shaped the lives of [various] people today and in centuries past ... [It] deserves a place on every bookshelf, coffee table or bedside table." Although otherwise favorable, Nick Gillespie of Reason questioned the appropriateness of "The Charge of the Light Brigade" and "The Three Little Pigs" in their respective "Responsibility" and "Work" chapters, alongside the compiler's attempts to define a "common world of shared ideals" whose spirit predated modern media. Writing on the 30th anniversary edition, the City Journal's Robert Pondiscio felt that the collection aged well in terms of diversity, adding, "Perhaps Bennett and his wife and co-editor Elayne might yet be persuaded to add one more virtue in future editions: tolerance."

Among religious reviewers, Rosemary O'Donnell said, "Truly great anthologies come along once in a great while. And this is one of them." Jean Porter of The Christian Century commended the variety in the passages and Bennett's selection process, but said that his "anthology is not the brave, countercultural document that some of his admirers take it to be." In the academic press, W. Charles Breiner of the Journal of Education recommended the book, praising its compiler for his efforts to classify the passages, and its timeliness in the wake of America's then-ongoing social and moral crisis. "While giving priority to good deeds, good thoughts, and the good in humanity," said Breiner, "Bennett judiciously sprinkles poor judgment, bad character, and vices into the collection, creating readily identifiable contrasts to heighten and strengthen our role as 'moral agents.'"

Reviewers were muted on the portions Bennett himself penned. "[Though] never shy about appearing to speak his mind," said Paulos, "[he] is surprisingly not much of a presence in his own book." The compiler's views on "what is right and wrong," said Thomas Curwen of People magazine, "at times come across as self-serving and presumptuous." Porter felt that "His own editorial voice, sometimes wise and funny, is at other times distressingly smug."

=== Critiques ===
A critical essay by The New Republic's Martha Nussbaum stated, "This [collection], which announces from the start its determination to convey optimism and hope, wavers between a Reader's Digest optimism about the moral life and a more strenuous hopefulness. Simple patriotism and crude flag-worship are certainly in evidence, but there are also signs of a more exacting ideal." Lee Siegel, in a December 1993 issue of The Nation, said that "Bennett ... has confused right and wrong with right and left ... [rendering Virtues] as dumb as it is immoral." Writing for Commentary magazine, James Q. Wilson felt that two speeches included in the book, Martin Luther King Jr.'s "I Have a Dream" and Abraham Lincoln's Gettysburg Address, "[are not stories but rather] arguments". Michelle Ann Abate, who devoted the first chapter of her 2010 book Raising Your Kids Right to a study of Virtues, remarked that "[The] moral maxims ... are as neat and tidy as they are impractical and unrealistic ... The lessons offered [here] are not simply unhelpful; they may even be harmful, painting a portrait of the world that does more harm than good." As Abate added, "Consistency of tone and continuity of message are other features with which The Book of Virtues often struggle[s]." In 2002, Darcia Narvaez disputed Bennett's claims that children would develop morality after hearing moral stories, by claiming he relied on a model known as the "passive reader" theory.

The diversity and timeframe of Virtues' selections faced occasional criticism. Henry L. Carrigan Jr. wrote in Library Journal that the quality "ranges from the great to the schmaltzy" and that the "lack of attention to women's and non-Western voices encourages the view that the experience of virtue belongs primarily to Western males." Its tendency to stress slavery and racial equality, Nussbaum noted, "undercuts many of the book's more complacent utterances." Siegel similarly singled out the segments dealing with African-American figures, which Abate noted only numbered six. Abate observed Bennett's concentration on material from Western civilization; the dearth of contributions from Asian-American and Latin American authors; and the fact that the Native American tales (covering only 15 pages) were sourced from retellings by white Americans and Canadians instead of indigenous figures. She also found the era of the original passages at odds with modern-day expectations, while noting the old-fashioned style of its cover illustration. Sessions Stepp expressed concern over outdated gender stereotypes and the absence of more modern perspectives: "[A]lmost nothing original from the 20th century ... without [which] the book seems to suggest that moral behavior is entirely a thing of the past."

Wilson noted the absence of a chapter on justice, feeling accounts revolving around this field did not translate well to narrative form. Likewise, Sessions Stepp said that fairness, "one of the two or three most important ingredients in a child's early moral development," was left off the virtue list. "The careful reader can pick out instances of fairness or justice (and injustice) in other selections, but it deserves a category of its own. Without it Bennett appears at best uninformed and at worst, heartless." James A. Nash proposed frugality as another chapter suggestion in 1998, while Dan P. McAdams and Jack J. Bauer nominated gratitude six years later.

Susan Moore in the IPA Review of Melbourne, Australia, said, "Almost all the verse in The Book of Virtues is of greeting card calibre; and too many of the prose selections, penned by unknown authors, are similarly hackneyed. Bennett lacks the ear which helps talented editors to distinguish immediately between the moralistic and the compellingly moral ... Despite [a slate of] embarrassing weaknesses, however, Bennett's book is a helpful starting point for adults who share his awareness that 'children are essentially moral and spiritual beings' who deserve to experience a much richer literature than, of late, they have been given." Moore also criticized the "watered-down" and "disappointing" retellings of the older material at hand, along with the "saccharine poems" being at odds with "powerful" selections. Curwen similarly noted, "His juxtapositions are particularly striking. Aesop's fables, Jack and the Beanstalk and P. T. Barnum take their place beside Plato, Aristotle and Thucydides."

One of Bennett's critics, Jon Katz of Wired magazine, called him to task for making millions of dollars on the book and its follow-ups at the expense of lower-income people in their target audience. "I don't think there is any evidence he has helped a single child in America," Katz told the Sun Sentinel in 1997. "He takes stories he didn't even write, he sanitizes them, and then he puts a moral spin on them." Various outlets noted the irony and hypocrisy in Bennett's mission on at least three separate occasions: during 1995, when he accepted an offer to have his collection adapted into animation (despite criticizing certain aspects of the television medium at the time); in 1997, when he confessed to smoking before and after his duties as "Drug Czar"; and again in 2003, thanks to exposés surrounding his gambling habit.

Several also acknowledged the influence of the McGuffey line Bennett sought to emulate, as well as the Victorian flair; the aim to recapture the nostalgia of his past generation; and the bowdlerization of some of the stories collected. Gillespie felt that the anthology exhibited a "gentler, kinder" side of Bennett when compared to his activity as "Drug Czar", a view echoed by Dionne Jr. Its Christian and conservative undertones also received attention; Siegel, in particular, highlighted the frequency of the word "God" throughout the text. Newsweek predicted that Virtues would help Bennett secure the Republican slot during the 1996 U.S. presidential race, but the compiler dropped out by August 1994.

== Legacy ==
Bennett initially ruled out a follow-up to The Book of Virtues, "but was swayed by readers who urged him to do so and even sent in their own nominations." This led to preparations for print and multimedia successors from March through September 1994; as he joked to the Newsweek team, "Maybe I'll call [the sequel] 'Son of the Book of Virtues'." Modeled after their 1993 precursor, the print installments – The Moral Compass: Stories for a Life's Journey, and two spin-offs for young audiences, The Book of Virtues for Young People and The Children's Book of Virtues – came out in 1995, with several more titles issued until 2008. A January 1998 Washington Post article cited Bennett's resulting franchise as an example of "flooding the market", in which authors produce sequels within a short stretch of time to meet popular and merchandising demand.

=== The Moral Compass ===
Subtitled A Companion to The Book of Virtues, The Moral Compass consists of seven chapters, each pertaining to a different stage of life: "Home and Hearth", "Into the World", "Standing Fast", "Easing the Path", "Mothers and Fathers, Husbands and Wives", "Citizenship and Leadership", and "What We Live By". Selections from Alexis de Tocqueville, Emily Dickinson, Theodore Roosevelt, and Mark Twain are featured in this volume, along with a return appearance by Wilde. According to Publishers Weekly, the passages "come mostly from times when masculine virtue was considered the norm and men took center stage. Most are from European or Western culture, but a not inconsiderable number are drawn from African, Asian and Latin American traditions." The chapter scheme was devised by Bob Asahina, Simon & Schuster's vice president and senior editor.

Compass was published on October 20, 1995, and debuted in 15th place on the NYT Nonfiction list for November 5. Out of the 730,000 copies in its first printing, 550,000 were sold in its first year of publication. Reviews for this follow-up were slightly more positive. (Note: The Kitchener Record, Kirkus, and the New Straits Times offered favorable notices, while the National Review was split in its opinion, and The New Republic issued a weak review.)

=== Children's spin-offs ===
The Book of Virtues for Young People is a "slightly simplified" version of the 1993 work aimed towards adolescent readers. The Children's Book of Virtues (whose first printing comprised 500,000 copies) contains more than 30 stories, plus illustrations by Michael Hague; Bennett conceived the spin-off to address concerns that the original was not as accessible to children. Over the next decade, he produced a line of titles adhering to the format (with Hague staying on until 2002):

- The Children's Book of Heroes (1997)
- The Children's Book of America (1998)
- The Children's Book of Faith (2000)
- The Children's Treasury of Virtues (2000)
- The Children's Book of Home and Family (2002)
- The Book of Virtues for Girls and Boys (2008)

=== Competitors ===
Virtues gave rise to "an entirely new subgenre of conservative-themed children's books", and was part of what Joel D. Biermann referred to as the "virtue ethics" movement. An early response from this sector, Richard Brookhiser's Founding Father (1996), chronicled the life of George Washington. To counter some criticism over Bennett's story choices, HarperCollins published A Call to Character in November 1995 as "a liberal alternative" to Virtues. A collaboration between Parade columnist Colin Greer and educator Herbert Kohl, Call shares six of its virtues and several author choices with its forebear, and replaces the remaining four with nine new categories. Two Christian-focused counterparts – Stuart and Jill Briscoe's The Family Book of Christian Values, and Lissa Roche's The Christian's Treasury of Stories & Songs, Prayers & Poem & Much More for Young & Old – came out around the same time. A year earlier, Pocket Books released Tony Hendra's paperback parody of Bennett, The Book of Bad Virtues: A Treasure of Immortality, which Hendra devised as "a satirical answer to [the original's] hypocritical nature".

In August 1995, weeks before the official Bennett follow-ups were published, Simon & Schuster sued Dove Entertainment for infringement on the Virtues trademark. Dove had released The Children's Audiobook of Virtues earlier that year, with plans for their own Children's Book of Virtues later on. As part of the suit, Dove withdrew the titles from the market; their decision was upheld in court when the infringement charges were confirmed, invoking the Lanham Act. By October, they were "ordered to pay S&S and Bennett all of [their] profits on the infringing audiobooks and to reimburse them for certain legal costs."

=== Adaptations ===
==== Adventures from the Book of Virtues ====
In 1996, the 1993 Virtues collection became the basis for PBS' first primetime animated series, Adventures from the Book of Virtues. The series' main human characters, Annie Redfeather (a Native American) and Zach Nichols, were accompanied by three animal friends: woodchuck Aristotle, buffalo Plato, and bobcat Socrates. Celebrity guest voices included Ed Asner, Tim Curry, Shelley Duvall, Mark Hamill, Kathy Najimy, Malcolm-Jamal Warner, and Elijah Wood. Produced by PorchLight Entertainment and funded by the John M. Olin Foundation, the animated Virtues aired for three seasons until 2000, and was rerun in more than 65 countries by the 2010s. It was supported by merchandise from Wendy's and Chick-fil-A (among other companies), and VHS/DVD releases from Warner Home Video.

==== Click (2006) ====
A comedy film, Click, starring and produced by comedian Adam Sandler and directed by Frank Coraci, was distributed by Sony Pictures on June 23, 2006, in the United States, which was loosely based on one of the stories in Virtues, "The Magic Thread", follows the story about a workaholic family man, Michael Newman (played by Sandler), who acquires a magical universal remote to use it to control reality. It is also the only Sandler-produced film to be nominated for Academy Award, which was for Best Makeup, but lost to Pan's Labyrinth.

== See also ==
- List of The New York Times number-one books of 1994
