= Angel Adams Parham =

American scholar and academic

Academic background
- Education: Yale University

Academic work
- Discipline: Sociology
- Institutions: University of Virginia
- Notable works: American routes: Racial palimpsests and the transformation of race (2017, OUP)

Angel Adams Parham is an associate professor of sociology at University of Virginia. Her research addresses the intersection of identity, migration, race and national belonging.

== Education ==
Parham received a BA in sociology from Yale University in 1994, followed by an MS in sociology from the University of Wisconsin-Madison in 1998. She received her PhD in sociology from the University of Wisconsin-Madison in 2003.

== Career ==
Parham is an associate professor of sociology at the University of Virginia and a senior fellow with the Institute for Advanced Studies in Culture (IASC). Previous to this, she was associate professor of sociology at Loyola University-New Orleans. She was a member of the Institute for Advanced Study in Princeton, New Jersey in 2011–12, where she undertook research on the role of links between Louisiana and St. Domingue/ Haiti in relation to race.

Parham co-founded and directs the Nyansa Classical Community, an after school programme aimed at enabling African-American students of low-income and disadvantaged families in New Orleans. The programme focuses on reading from Classical mythology, Greek and Roman texts, and Biblical stories, and is supported by the Society for Classical Studies and Tulane University.

Her 2017 monograph American Routes: Racial Palimpsests and the Transformation of Race was the co-winner of the 2018 American Sociological Association's Barrington Moore Book Award in Comparative and Historical Sociology, the co-winner of the 2018 Social Science History Association's Allan Sharlin Memorial Book Award and received an Honorable Mention for the 2018 American Sociological Association's Thomas and Znaniecki Distinguished Book Award for International Migration. She coauthored The Black Intellectual Tradition: Reading Freedom in Classical Literature published by Classical Academic Press in 2022.

== Selected publications ==
- Parham, Angel Adams. "Diaspora, community and communication: Internet use in transnational Haiti." Global Networks 4.2 (2004): 199–217.
- Parham, Angel Adams. "Internet, place, and public sphere in diaspora communities." Diaspora: A Journal of Transnational Studies 14.2 (2005): 349–380.
- Parham, Angel Adams. "Race, memory and family history." Social identities 14.1 (2008): 13–32.
- Parham, Angel Adams. American routes: Racial palimpsests and the transformation of race. Oxford University Press, 2017.

== See also ==
- Blackness and the Western Classical Tradition
