= Canterbury, West Virginia =

Unincorporated community in West Virginia, United States

Canterbury
- Unincorporated community
- Location within the state of West Virginia Canterbury (the United States)
- Coordinates: 37°49′17″N 82°15′25″W
- Country: United States
- State: West Virginia
- County: Mingo
- Elevation: 676 ft (206 m)
- Time zone: UTC-5 (Eastern (EST))
  - Summer (DST): UTC-4 (EDT)
- GNIS ID: 1537016

Canterbury is an unincorporated community in Mingo County, West Virginia, United States. Its post office is closed.

The community was named for the English city of Canterbury. However, another source asserts the community was probably named after the local Canterbury family.
