= HMS Canterbury =

Three ships of the Royal Navy have borne the name HMS Canterbury, after the English city of Canterbury:

- HMS Canterbury (1692) was an 8-gun storeship purchased in 1692 and foundered in 1703. She was raised and then sold.
- HMS Canterbury (1693) was a 60-gun fourth rate launched in 1693. She was rebuilt in 1722 and 1744, when she was rearmed to carry 58 guns. She was on harbour service from 1761 and was broken up in 1770.
- HMS Canterbury (1915) was a C-class light cruiser launched in 1915 and sold in 1934.

There was also HMS Canterbury Castle, a planned Castle-class corvette, cancelled in 1943.

== See also ==
- HMNZS Canterbury, Royal New Zealand Navy named after the New Zealand region
