= Canterbury (furniture) =

A Canterbury is a low, open-topped stand with vertical slatted partitions that frequently was designed with a drawer beneath and sometimes, was built with short legs and occasionally on casters, intended for holding sheet music, plates, and serveware upright, now often used as a magazine rack. Originally found in England during the 1780s, from about 1800 they were made in mahogany, and later, in rosewood and walnut. Later, nineteenth-century versions sometimes were taller and were made in brass or combinations of metal and wood.

According to Thomas Sheraton the derivation of the name of this furniture item is that a "bishop of the Episcopal See first gave orders for those pieces" to be built.

By the 1860s, the Canterbury was considered a status symbol within wealthier American homes, and elsewhere. In the Australian novel by Ethel Turner (1872-1958) Seven Little Australians (1894), Chapter III "Virtue Not Always Rewarded" mentions a music canterbury: "Meg had betaken herself to the drawing-room, and was sitting on the floor before the music canterbury with scissors, thimble, and a roll of narrow blue ribbon on her knee, and all her father's songs, that he so often complained were falling to pieces, spread out before her".
