= Adventures from the Book of Virtues =

- Genre: Adventure; Fantasy; Educational; Anthology
- Created by: Bruce D. Johnson
- Based on: Selections from The Book of Virtues by William Bennett
- Directed by: Walt Kubiak
- Voices of: Pamela Adlon; Kath Soucie; Kevin Michael Richardson; Frank Welker; Jim Cummings; Andrew Francis; Adrienne Carter; Gillian Barber; Christopher Judge; Michael Donovan; Lee Tockar
- Theme music composer: Music and lyrics: J. A. C. Redford and Marcus Hummon
- Opening theme: "The Adventure Has Begun"; Performed by Oren Waters, Julia Waters, Maxine Waters, and Bobbi Page
- Composers: J. A. C. Redford; Stu Goldberg (performance and recording); Carl Johnson (arrangements and additional music)
- Country of origin: United States
- Original language: English
- No. of seasons: 3
- No. of episodes: 39

Production
- Executive producers: Bruce D. Johnson; William T. Baumann; Mary Mazur
- Producers: Tom Gleason; Fred Schaefer
- Running time: 30 minutes
- Production companies: KCET Los Angeles; PorchLight Entertainment; Fox Animation Studios

Original release
- Network: PBS
- Release: September 2, 1996 – December 17, 2000

Adventures from the Book of Virtues is an American animated children's television series based on the books The Book of Virtues: A Treasury of Great Moral Stories, and The Children's Book of Virtues, both by William Bennett, who served as Secretary of Education under President Ronald Reagan. The program focuses on two main human characters, Annie and Zach, who learn many life lessons from their friends Plato the bison, Aurora the red-tailed hawk, Aristotle the prairie dog, and Socrates the bobcat. These lessons are told in the form of animated segments based on stories from a variety of origins including Bible stories, fairy tales, fables, mythology, and folk stories from diverse cultures.

The first primetime animated series on PBS, Adventures from the Book of Virtues originally aired as part of the network's children's programming block from September 2, 1996 until the series finale on December 17, 2000; an epilogue to the series would be released on home video in June 2001. There was a two-year gap in between the second and third seasons; the series' production ended in June 2000. Reruns of the series were broadcast on PBS Kids until September 4, 2005, and on the now-defunct Qubo from November 3, 2008 until September 24, 2017.

== Premise ==
The series centered on two best friends: 10-year-old Annie Redfeather, who is Native American, and 11-year-old Zach Nichols, who is white. In each episode of the series, one of them commits an act contrary to that day's chosen virtue (loyalty, compassion, courage, moderation, honesty, etc.) and suffers pain as a result (be it physical or moral). They seek counsel of one of Annie's animal friends. These animal friends are four anthropomorphic mountain-dwelling entities who between them possess immense knowledge of legends and literature as well as common sense and a lively sense of fun. They utilize classical works of famous authors, philosophers, poets, as well as fables and myths to communicate the truth of virtue to Zach and Annie. Plato, the oldest, is a scholarly bison; Aurora, the most gentle, is a red-tailed hawk; Socrates "Sock" is a rambunctious bobcat; and Aristotle "Ari" is a prairie dog who is seldom without his bag of books. These four, whose existence seems a secret from the majority of humans in the town of Spring Valley, advise Annie and Zach patiently and often. The children then proceed to live according to the virtue of the day, completing what they have begun.

== Cast ==
=== Principal voice actors ===
Major voice cast
Role	Original recording		Overdub
Annie Redfeather	Season 1–2	Kath Soucie	Denise Tan
Annie Redfeather	Season 3	Adrienne Carter	Denise Tan
Zach Nichols	Season 1–2	Pamela Adlon	Chio-Su Ping
Zach Nichols	Season 3	Andrew Francis	Chio-Su Ping
Aurora	Season 1–2	Kath Soucie	Denise Tan
Aurora	Season 3	Gillian Barber	Denise Tan
Plato	Season 1–2	Kevin Michael Richardson	Joseph Murray
Plato	Season 3	Christopher Judge	Joseph Murray
Socrates	Season 1–2	Frank Welker	Joseph Murray
Socrates	Season 3	Michael Donovan	Joseph Murray
Aristotle	Season 1–2	Jim Cummings	Joseph Murray
Aristotle	Season 3	Lee Tockar	Joseph Murray

Frank Welker also voices Aegeus, Minotaur, Dharma, Mongal Dog, The Man, Frog Father, Billy Chipmunk and The Dog. Jim Cummings also voices Pythias, Camel, Ox, Genghis Khan, Mordecai, King Alfred, Arnot, King Richard III, Sir Jacques, Arthur Keller, Gardener, Miser, The Emperor ("Humility"), Mamuken, Nathaniel, Tommy Chickadee, Rollonde and Cyclops. Kath Soucie also voices Aunt Polly, George Washington, Queen Vashti, Joshua, Lars, Emma, Tiberius, Caius, Helen Keller, Dick, and Snake-Child.

In 2006, the first two seasons were overdubbed in Singapore at Studio Bizarro, with voice direction by Brian Zimmerman, Joseph Murray and Chuck Powers with all of them acting in it as well, alongside Denise Tan, Chio-Su Ping, and Brad Boyer. According to Powers, PorchLight could not afford to pay residual royalties to the celebrity voice actors in the region. The dub is available on recent DVD releases and TV airings on Qubo and the former BYUtv.

=== Guest stars ===
Adventures from the Book of Virtues featured prominent voice actors and celebrities on the series' 39 episodes, including the following:

- Lewis Arquette as Old Man Rabbit, the Farmer
- Edward Asner as Daniel
- René Auberjonois as Tabona
- Adrienne Barbeau as Greta
- Kathy Bates as Girls' Mother
- Scott Bakula as Elbagast
- Irene Bedard as Morning Light, Sharp Eyes
- Ed Begley Jr. as William Tell, Alec
- Shari Belafonte as the Elephant
- Jeff Bennett as The Frog Prince, Samuel Washington
- Mary Kay Bergman as Marla, Gabriela, the Old Woman/Princess, Gwyneth
- Dean Cain as King Charlemagne
- Cam Clarke as Alexander the Great, the Hare
- Jane Carr as Friend Cat, Beekeeper
- Catherine Cavadini as Snake Mother
- Christine Cavanaugh as Frog-Child
- Lacey Chabert as Younger Daughter
- Tim Curry as King Minos, Albrecht Gessler
- Olivia d'Abo as Anne Sullivan
- E. G. Daily as Anders
- Daniel Davis as Horse
- Pam Dawber as Liese
- Michael Des Barres as Haman
- Michael Dorn as Apollo
- Shelley Duvall as Fairy
- John Forsythe as Daedalus
- Robert Foxworth as C.H. Claudy
- Peter Gallagher as Michelangelo
- Henry Gibson as Dick's Please
- Joanna Gleason as Della
- Gilbert Gottfried as the Rat
- Michael Gough as Abraham Lincoln
- Khrystyne Haje as Inothea
- Jennifer Hale as Mountain Cloud, Maiden, Kate Keller
- Mark Hamill as Theseus, Saint George
- Mark Harmon as Odysseus
- Tippi Hedren as Madame Sofroni, Molly Mouse
- Charlton Heston as Cincinnatus
- Michael Horse as Strong Wind, Chief
- Miko Hughes as Prince Fredolin
- Robert Ito as Hofus
- Tony Jay as King Darius
- Arte Johnson as John's Please
- Dean Jones as Chauncey
- Ashley Judd as Cornelia
- Carol Kane as the Beetle
- Josh Keaton as Sir Roland
- Andrew Lawrence as Ben Rogers
- Matthew Lawrence as Tom Sawyer
- Jennifer Jason Leigh as Alexandra
- Eriq La Salle as King Menelaus
- Richard Libertini as King Yudhishthira
- Nancy Linari as Woodcutter's wife, Emma, Arnot's wife
- Sherry Lynn as Marygold
- Tress MacNeille as Teacher, Peter's Mother
- Malcolm McDowell as Indra
- Candi Milo as Quiet Fire
- Ricardo Montalbán as Brother Pedro, Merchant
- Esai Morales as Guillermo
- Pat Morita as Mr. Straw
- Pat Musick as Clymene
- Kathy Najimy as Old Woman
- George Newbern as Damon
- Paige O'Hara as Princess (The Frog Prince), June Washington
- Rob Paulsen as Peter, Alvin, Eduardo, Pope Julius II
- Brock Peters as King Ahasuerus
- Lou Diamond Phillips as Martin
- Bronson Pinchot as The Man and The Dog (The Camel Without a Hump)
- Paula Poundstone as Jinn
- Clive Revill as King Midas
- Neil Ross as King Canute II
- Julian Sands as Henry
- Chris Sarandon as Jim
- Ben Savage as Jinkyswoitmaya
- George Segal as Eli
- Charles Shaughnessy as Charles
- Peter Strauss as King Dionysius
- Tara Strong (credited as "Tara Charendoff") as Little Girl and Heidi
- Wes Studi as Scarface
- Cree Summer as Bessie, the Antelope
- Mark Taylor as Mr. Sims
- Lauren Tom as Mother ("Charity")
- Joan Van Ark as Queen Esther
- B. J. Ward as Mrs. Nichols, Princess Ariadne, Walter Tell, John
- Malcolm-Jamal Warner as Henry
- Billy West as the Spider
- Elijah Wood as Icarus
- Alfre Woodard as Harriet Tubman
- Adam Wylie as Croseus, Russ
- Michael York as Androcles

== Production ==
In June 1994, television producer Bruce D. Johnson, then an executive vice-president at Hanna-Barbera, was browsing through a bookstore in Washington, D.C. when he stumbled upon Bennett's 1993 book of moral tales, The Book of Virtues. Compelled by the book's themes, Johnson called Bennett with the idea of an animated television program for children based upon the book. According to Johnson:

"...I placed a cold call to William Bennett. To my surprise, he takes the call; to my chagrin, he informs me that 19 other companies have already approached him, including Disney, and that he was 'down the road' on a probable deal at that moment. Nevertheless, I inform him of my experience producing anthologies and express an interest in producing his book wherever it ended up. We have a pleasant conversation, and he offhandedly asks me to fax my resume to him. I do."

Johnson and Bennett eventually met and bonded over their shared dedication to children's television and moral philosophy. From there, the two agreed to begin production on what would become Adventures.

That same year in the 1994 midterm elections, the Republican Party won control of the U.S. House of Representatives and the Senate, giving the Party control of Congress for the first time in four decades. In January 1995, Speaker of the House Newt Gingrich expressed publicly his desire to "zero out" federal funding for PBS, stating, "Why would you say to some poor worker out here with three kids, 'We're now going to take your money and tax you for a program that you may never watch?'" As the debate over federal funding for public broadcasting was being waged in Congress, Johnson shopped the developing project around to various networks, hoping to find one that would air Adventures in a prime time slot. The final taker was PBS, who at first aired the series in prime time during its debut in September 1996, then gave the series a regular weekend timeslot in February 1997. Many conservative figures approved of PBS's pickup of the series. When asked whether PBS was attempting to appease Congressional Republicans by accepting a series developed by a well-regarded Reagan cabinet appointee, PBS President Ervin S. Duggan denied, stating, "We are not buying Bill Bennett's opinions... The series is not political at all." Adventures from the Book of Virtues went on to become the first animated series to air on PBS in primetime.

The series sought to illustrate themes of common virtues through famous all-embracing heroes and stories, based on Bennett's The Book of Virtues. The core audience were families with children who were between the ages of 6 and 10 years old. Music for the opening sequence and the first season was produced by J. A. C. Redford.

In 2006, the first two seasons were redubbed in Singapore. According to Chuck Powers, one of the voice actors in the Singaporean dub, PorchLight redubbed the series because the studio could not afford to pay royalties to the celebrity voice actors.

== Episodes ==
=== Series overview ===
Season	Episodes	Originally released	
Season	Episodes	First released	Last released
1	13	September 2, 1996	March 2, 1997
2	13	February 15, 1998	May 10, 1998
3	13	September 24, 2000	December 17, 2000
Epilogue		June 12, 2001	

=== Season 1 (1996–1997) ===
No. overall	No. in season	Title	Directed by	Written by	Original release date
1	1	"Work"	Joanna Romersa	John Loy	September 2, 1996
A thunderstorm strikes the forest, knocking a tree into the Rainbowl river. Zach and Annie volunteer to clean it out, along with Plato, Ari, and Aurora, but Sock isn't interested in helping. Plato tells him the story "How the Camel Got His Hump", where the camel's refusing to work gave him trouble, and "Tom Sawyer Gives Up the Brush", where it was learned that working is more enjoyable than laziness.
2	2	"Honesty"	Joanna Romersa	Len Uhley	September 2, 1996
Zach is sorely tempted to touch his father's beautiful antique camera, despite promising not to - and when he does, he breaks it and lies that it fell off its display table naturally. Plato tries to convince Zach to tell the truth by telling him the stories of "The Frog Prince", where the title character received a punishment for breaking his word and "George Washington and the Cherry Tree", whose protagonist too broke something he promised to guard but learned his lesson in a different way. Annie even tells a family tale of "The Indian Cinderella", where a Native American warrior only wished for an honest companion. Even the poem "Truth" shows how good it is to be seen and how much joy it can give through life.
3	3	"Responsibility"	Joanna Romersa	Glenn Leopold	September 3, 1996
Annie agrees to put her brand-new bike to good use by delivering cakes from her mother's bakery, but can't resist Zach's offer to race - and is angry with him when her bike crashes and the food is ruined. Plato and Aurora try to convince her that responsibility is always handy to keep around as shown in "Icarus and Daedalus" where a boy behaved irresponsibly by disobeying his father and paid for it, or "King Alfred and the Cakes" where even a renowned English ruler was forced to admit he neglected his simple duty. Ari tells "The Chest of Broken Glass", where a mother reminds her family what rewards responsibility versus irresponsibility bring and how much can be owed to those in a family. Even the poem "If You Were" sums up what responsibility everyone has to humanity for making the world better.
4	4	"Compassion"	Joanna Romersa	Marion Wells	September 3, 1996
Emile Zigrodny, a classmate Zach barely knows, loses his house in a fire, and Zach is hesitant to show him support since their first meeting would be his giving charity. Plato and the others try to push him in the right direction by pointing out that anyone can be kind since even the least likely are capable of it as shown in the Biblical story "The Good Samaritan". They encourage him that anyone can make a difference no matter how young by reading "The Legend of the Dipper", or how it proved to have lasting effects for the giver and the receiver in "Androcles and the Lion". Even the poem "The New Colossus" shows what many hope America and all people should be to the needy.
5	5	"Courage"	Joanna Romersa	Betty G. Birney	September 4, 1996
Annie is defeated badly by a formidable opponent in a hurdles race, and her confidence leaves her after that. Plato tries to help her get her it back by telling the story of "Theseus and The Minotaur", where an opportunity was taken to protect people in spite of the danger, and of William Tell, who put plenty at risk for his own sake and others'. When Zach acts confident, Ari points out to them both that different levels of courage are needed in different situations, as shown in "The Brave Mice". Even the poem "If" is read as a reminder about how much courage life demands all in all.
6	6	"Self-Discipline"	Joanna Romersa	Betty G. Birney and Len Uhley	September 4, 1996
Zach offers Annie and the animals favors for money since he wants to buy a new game, but his mother won't give him an advance on his allowance at home. So the animals help him learn more about self-discipline and patience by telling stories. Plato tells him the story of "King Midas" and how he loved his gold so much, he wished that everything he'd touch would turn to gold, but got carried away due to his greed and lack of self-discipline. After Zach explains that he got into a fight with his mother about not giving him more money and said he'd be better off without her, Aurora tells "The King and His Hawk" where Genghis Khan didn't control his temper when he killed his pet hawk after it tried to stop him from drinking water poisoned by a snake. To teach Zach more about patience, Plato narrates "The Magic Thread" where a boy learned that experiencing only the good moments in life didn't turn out as he expected. Even a set of Bible verses from Ecclesiastes points out that "To Everything There is a Season". Afterwards, Zach realizes that the game he wanted doesn't come out till next week and heads home where he gives his mother a flower to apologize to her.
7	7	"Friendship"	Joanna Romersa	Libby Hinson and Glenn Leopold	February 9, 1997
Annie is upset when her friend, Sarah picks a partner other than her on their school field trip canoeing, even though she agreed to pair up with her. Plato points out that friendship can take a lot of strength to build but it takes more to get through life without it by telling "Why Frog-child and Snake-child Never Play Together", where two creatures regret the lack of friendship in their lives. "Waukewa's Eagle" shows how compassion is occasionally found in real friendships by a Native American's relationship with a bird and saved it when his father advised him to put it out of its misery, and he reminds her of just how much true friendship is worth, as proved in "Damon and Pythias", where two best friends put ultimate trust in one another. Even the poem "New Friends and Old Friends" sets a good example of how long friendship should last.
8	8	"Loyalty"	Joanna Romersa	Mark Young	February 9, 1997
Zach enjoys birdwatching with a man from town, but in climbing on a plaque to get up to a tree he breaks it and doesn't get why Mr. Cleveland is so worked up over it. Plato explains the meaning of one of the words on it, "loyalty", by telling the stories of "Yudisthira at Heaven's Gate", where a king is challenged to choose between a companion and his dreams, and "The Cap That Mother Made", where a boy is tempted with great things for a homemade cap. When Plato remembers that the plaque was a war memorial and Zach remembers that Mr. Cleveland knew someone who died there, he also brings up the story of the Jewish-Persian queen Esther, who had to make the choice of risking life itself if she wished to save her own people. Even the poem "The Thousandth Man", shows how strong and great true loyalty is.
9	9	"Respect"	Walt Kubiak	Mark Young	February 16, 1997
Zach and Annie are building a go-cart out of scraps from a friend's junkyard, but don't strike gold with every piece they find right away, and are ready to blame Jake Jeeters when he kicks them out after they yell at him. Plato hears their complaints and points out that manners leave a lasting impression, just as they did in the story "Please", and that the results for using and not using them are different by reading "Diamonds and Toads". & finally Plato points out that everyone deserves respect no matter who or what they are, with the telling of "The Bell of Atri", when a horse gets justice for its master improperly treating it.
10	10	"Faith"	Joanna Romersa	Marion Wells	February 16, 1997
Annie is saddened when her faith-devoted neighbor and friend Ruth passes away, and wonders whether faith is really worth it because of that. Plato tries to convince her that it is very much worth it by telling the stories of the Hebrew Daniel in the lions' den, who looked to faith always and saw how times of trouble caused it to prove strong, and Harriet Tubman's determination to use faith to continue taking risks throughout her life. Even the 23rd Psalm is a good example of why there's enough reason for faith to live throughout life.
11	11	"Humility"	Walt Kubiak	Marion Wells	February 23, 1997
Annie is delighted to win the class presidency, but upon receiving it becomes proud of her position, creating conflicts with other students and teachers. Plato reminds her that a ruler's not swallowing pride often brings a painful fall to humiliation as proved in "The Emperor's New Clothes". On the other hand, "King Canute at the Seashore" is noted as a reminder of how humility is a good thing for anybody but especially those trusted with power, but the mistakes made by a noble-blooded youth who thought only of what he could do with his power brought suffering to many in "Phaethon". Even the Serenity Prayer is read as a reminder of how much peace humility can bring.
12	12	"Generosity"	Walt Kubiak	John Loy	February 23, 1997
Plato learns that Annie and Zach are collecting canned goods for a homeless shelter, but their first priority is the rewards they'll get instead of helping the hungry. He tries to explain how true giving requires selflessness, as shown in the story of "Rocking-Horse Land" where it's done between friends, and how it can be more satisfactory than receiving by telling "Old Man Rabbit's Thanksgiving Dinner". "The Gift of the Magi" is read as a reminder that even the thought of attempting to give something helps since it is the thought that counts. Even the poem "Count That Day Lost" is read as a reminder of exactly what giving, in any form, is worth in life.
13	13	"Perseverance"	Joanna Romersa	John Loy	March 2, 1997
Zach and Annie have been taking lessons in guitar and karate, respectively, but now decide they don't want to stay in them anymore. Plato tries to remind them of how rewarding persistence can be by telling the stories of "Scarface", about a Native American warrior who was rewarded based on how hard he tried for something he wanted after saving a god's son from giant vulture-like birds of prey, and "The Stars in the Sky", where a girl learned how pleasing staying with a goal was afterward. A Greek hero's story in "Odysseus and the Cyclops" proved how important tenacity is in times of trouble. Even the poem "You Mustn't Quit" shows how important perseverance is through life.

=== Season 2 (1998) ===
No. overall	No. in season	Title	Original release date
14	1	"Trustworthiness"	February 15, 1998
Zach is excited that a college football player that he has as his role model will attend his school pep rally, so volunteers to help out in order to meet him. But he doesn't think cleaning up for the assembly is worth it, and is prepared to go back on his word. Meanwhile, Sock is reluctant to help Ari find his misplaced glasses as promised because of his fear of tunnels. Plato explains that character is shown by letting actions compare to words as shown in "The Bear and the Travellers", where a badger learned of his companion's nature in a bad time, and in "The Knights of the Silver Shield" where one was rewarded based on his choices on how to see his job completed.
15	2	"Determination"	February 22, 1998
Zach and Annie take off on a biking trail, determined to complete it before sun down. But when Zach has an accident and sprains his ankle, he and Annie tell each other stories of determination such as the myth of Proteus and Menelaus and the true story of courageous Jinkyswoitmaya.
16	3	"Integrity"	March 1, 1998
Annie gets more orders for her craft weather vanes than she can deliver right away, so rushes through them to sell them on time - then gets complaints about how they're dysfunctional. Plato encourages her to consider what the results show by telling "For Want of a Horseshoe Nail", where one incomplete task led to a remarkably high amount of trouble, and "Charlemagne and the Robber Knight", where a German emperor's thoughtfulness in how to deal with people proved life-saving.
17	4	"Gratitude"	March 8, 1998
Zach plans to invite a lot of classmates to his birthday party—more guests means more gifts!--until his parents tell him that they can only afford a small party for Zach's closest friends. Disappointed, Zach retreats to Plato's Peak where he hears tales on gratitude: "The Discontented Stonecutter", which warns that the grass is not greener on the other side of the fence and "Cornelia's Jewels", where a proud mother reminds a snobbish rival that people are more important than riches.
18	5	"Selflessness"	March 15, 1998
Annie's enthusiasm about her family's upcoming spring vacation doesn't last when she learns her mother wants her to be a part-time sitter for her little cousins. Plato tries to explain how helping out can bring rewards, as shown in "The Line of Golden Light", or should at least bring joy, as it did to a knight in "Saint George and the Dragon".
19	6	"Honor"	March 22, 1998
Zach needs a 90 on his history test to get an A-minus on his report card and just make the school honor roll. And it looks like he's done it ... until he realizes his teacher added the points wrong and he only got an 87. If he tells, he'll lose the honor he wanted so badly to win. But the tales of "The Honest Woodsman" and President Abraham Lincoln help him realize there's a more important kind of honor at stake.
20	7	"Patience"	March 29, 1998
Annie volunteers to tutor a younger student in math, but grows openly frustrated with him when it doesn't turn out as easy as she hoped, then regrets her offer to help to begin with. Plato tries to convince her that patience can make a difference, just like it did with another teacher, Anne Sullivan, who was forced to test every bit of hers to help her pupil, Helen Keller. He also shows how swallowing impatience in front of others brings satisfaction in "How the Brazilian Beetles Got Their Coats".
21	8	"Charity"	April 5, 1998
Annie and Zach are saddened to see some families in town don't have any heat or warm clothes for the cold winter, and wish someone could help. Plato explains how anyone can make a difference and even tells them the story of how a monk's giving to those in need was enough reward for him throughout his life in "The Emerald Lizard". The two are eager to donate many clothes to the families who need them, and Annie is even willing to offer her favorite coat---but soon wishes she never had done that. Hoping to bring out the satisfaction for her that everyone should feel after giving, Plato tells the story "Mr. Straw", where a poor man finds wealth through generosity to others.
22	9	"Leadership"	April 12, 1998
Zach doesn't think much of his football captain, until he's elected to the job himself and sees how hard it is to lead. Plato tries to encourage him how to make the job work by telling "The Tower to the Moon", where selflessness was needed to guide people through a task, and "The Gordian Knot", where the ability to think clearly was needed before any glory.
23	10	"Citizenship"	April 19, 1998
Annie is disappointed that her family's vacation is postponed since her father has jury duty, and wonders why he simply doesn't postpone it. Plato explains citizenship can reward good character, as shown in "The Stone in the Road" where those with and without it are repaid accordingly, and even if it doesn't, can make differences for the better, as a Roman demonstrates in "Cincinnatus" by leading when and how he believes he must during war.
24	11	"Diligence"	April 26, 1998
Zach decides he wants to be a photographer. He is diligent in his study of photography, until the school newspaper offers him what he considers a thankless assignment taking pictures for their new classified ads section. Zach is disappointed. With guidance from Plato and Aurora, who tell stories about "The Lazy Pig" and Michelangelo painting the Sistine Chapel, he realizes he should apply himself to this assignment with the same diligence he originally had for learning photography.
25	12	"Moderation"	May 3, 1998
Annie wants to play baseball so works hard at it, but starts to spend too little time on schoolwork. Plato points out that involving too much in something doesn't mean it brings reward, as a creature learns in "The Spider's Two Feasts" where determination to take much forced him to make a decision he didn't handle well, and a farmer learns in "The Goose That Laid the Golden Egg", where working too hard for something and not thinking of anything else proved disappointing.
26	13	"Wisdom"	May 10, 1998
Faced with the prospect of attending a new school, Zach wonders whether he is wise enough to make new friends or handle his new, more difficult studies. "The Story of Two Friends (The Ugandan Potter's Son)" told up at Plato's Peak, and a recap of his and Annie's past adventures ("Theseus and the Minotaur", "Waukewa and the Eagle", and "Ulysses and the Cyclops"), help him realize that he is wiser than he thought.

=== Season 3 (2000) ===
No. overall	No. in season	Title	Original release date
27	1	"Integrity"	September 24, 2000
Zach's dad brings a model replica of an artifact from Egypt for him to use on his history project, but Zach is embarrassed that it is fake and claims it is a real artifact - then trouble occurs when his teacher wonders if he can put it on display at a museum. Plato reminds him that exaggerating tall tales never pay off, as another found out in "The Boy Who Cried Wolf" when he wasn't believed even when he was truthful since he had a habit of lying.
28	2	"Work"	October 1, 2000
Annie chooses to build an electric motor for her science project but has a tough time with it so is ready to quit. Plato reminds her of a pair who wanted to build a machine but had to put a lot of effort into making the first airplane in "The Wright Brothers".
29	3	"Friendship"	October 8, 2000
Zach's new track-teammate is so skilled, Zach thinks he has to compete with him rather than try to befriend him. Plato points out that friends are interesting people since they can come from anywhere, and proves it by telling the story of another pair of rivals who ended up friends in "Robin Hood and Little John".
30	4	"Courage"	October 15, 2000
Zach is asked to deliver his father's film to the film laboratory, but is distracted on the way and chooses to go hiking first - then is trapped by a steep wall. Ari and Sock arrive with a rope after they find him, and while helping him, tell him the moralized version of the story of "Zach and the Beanstalk" to help him face his obstacle - and his problem of admitting he missed the opportunity to do his work.
31	5	"Perseverance"	October 22, 2000
Racing with Annie in the woods, Zach is quickly outrun and is unhappy enough about it to want to quit when he runs into Plato and the others. They remind him of another racer whose odds were against him but managed to win something even greater than a race when he persisted in "The Tortoise and the Hare".
32	6	"Honesty"	October 29, 2000
Annie agrees to give Zach $15 if he'll paint her fence for her, but later is reluctant to pay up. Plato tells the story of "The Pied Piper" as a reminder of how those who don't keep their word usually end up paying a higher price for dishonor than they would otherwise.
33	7	"Responsibility"	November 5, 2000
Annie is left to tend her uncle and aunt's garden, but is distracted by an invitation to play ball with some friends, so neglects it badly. Plato recites the poem "The Pupil in Magic" as a reminder that not taking care of duties quickly leads to trouble, as learned by a magician's apprentice whose trick of transforming a broom to carry water for him caused chaos.
34	8	"Self-Discipline"	November 12, 2000
Zach spends too much time playing a video-game when he should be reading his scout manual, so isn't ready for their camp-out. Plato reminds him too much of a good thing can hurt, as shown in "The Dancing Horses of Sybaris", where a whole community ended up suffering because they put pleasure before work.
35	9	"Moderation"	November 19, 2000
When a new TV channel showing all the most popular movies airs, Zach promises his parents he can watch it if he finishes all of his homework, does all of his chores, and doesn't overdo the TV watching, but he is unable to keep his promise by neglecting to do his chores and studies. As punishment, Zach's mother has revoked his TV privileges, but reinstates them when he gets a good grade on his next math quiz and does all of his chores and reminds him to moderate how much TV that he watches. Zach then plans to invite Annie over to his house for a weekend movie marathon. But when Zach breaks his promise once again by overdoing the TV watching and consuming all of the snacks and soda in the cupboard, Zach's parents put a stop to his and Annie's weekend movie marathon and remind them that they need a balanced diet and life, much to Zach's objection. Plato reminds Zach and Annie that moderation is a good way to live, proved in "The Cat and The Parrot", where a greedy cat gained nothing but trouble from his indulgence.
36	10	"Humility"	November 26, 2000
After boasting about how good she is at snowboarding, Annie feels bold enough to take a dare to ride down Deadmans Bluff, without thinking of the dangers it might bring. Nobody can convince her to change her mind, until Aristotle tells the story of "Pecos Bill and Slue-Foot Sue", where a foolhardy risk led to a bad situation.
37	11	"Gratitude"	December 3, 2000
Annie is glum when she gets a postcard from a New York City friend and wishes she lived somewhere more interesting like New York. Plato points out that Spring Valley has its fair share of advantages and tells the story of "The Country Mouse and the City Mouse", where a creature becomes grateful for the plain and routine home she has for its safety.
38	12	"A Christmas Carol"	December 10, 2000
39	13	"A Christmas Carol"	December 17, 2000
Annie is elected to be president of the drama club just in time for the Christmas pageant, but soon becomes obsessed with how much money will be made so forgets about the point of the message the play is trying to send when they do Charles Dickens' A Christmas Carol and dreams that she is Scrooge, Zach is Bob Crachit, Plato is Jacob Marley, Aristotle is the Ghost of Christmas Past, Socrates is the Ghost of Christmas Present, and Aurora is the Ghost of Christmas Yet to Come. Annie later mentions her dream to Plato, who reads A Christmas Carol to explain what they tell her - and remind that throughout the year, but especially at Christmas, giving to others is the greatest gift to give and the greatest reward.

=== Epilogue ===
Title	Original release date
"Plato's Guide for Parents and Kids"	June 12, 2001 (home video)
In the epilogue of the series, Plato the Buffalo and friends from Adventures from the Book of Virtues dispense advice on how best to handle the sometimes challenging aspects of parenting, focusing on the issue of character development in children. Fun-filled stories from the series provide answers for both kids and adults on many of the ongoing dilemmas faced by today's families.

== Broadcast and home media releases ==
The series was originally aired as part of PBS' children's programming block from September 2, 1996 until the series finale in December 2000; an epilogue to the series would be released on home video in June 2001. Reruns of the series were broadcast on most PBS stations (some airing the series as a weekday strip) until September 4, 2005, and on the now-defunct Qubo from November 3, 2008 until September 24, 2017. Turner Home Entertainment under license to PBS Home Video, released several videotapes of the series during 1996–1997. They were later re-released through Warner Bros. Home Entertainment. During 2008 and 2010, PorchLight Entertainment released several DVDs of the series. The series became available for streaming with the launch of Yippee in December 2019.
