= Canterbury Christian School =

Private school in California, United States

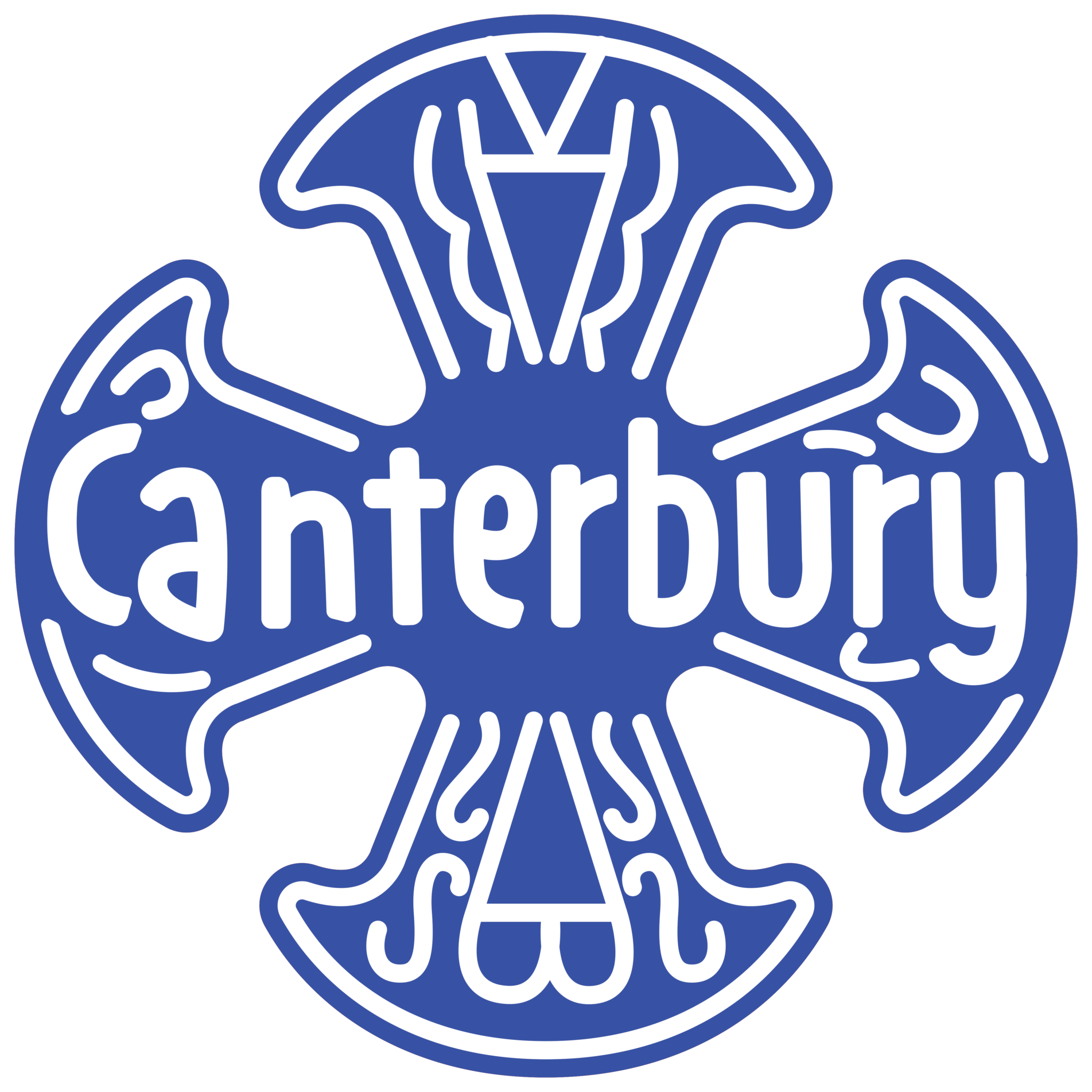

Location
- 101 North El Monte Ave; Los Altos, California; United States
- 37.383795°N 122.098455°W

Information
- Type: Private, Christian, Classical Christian Education
- Established: 1974
- Headmaster: Rev. Steve Macias
- Grades: Pre-Kindergarten through 8th
- Enrollment: 75
- Education system: Classical Christian education
- Colors: Red, White, and Blue
- Tuition: $11,000
- Website: www.canterbury.school

Canterbury Christian School is a private, classical Christian school and member of the Anglican School Association. It is located in Los Altos, California, and serves students from Kindergarten to Fifth Grade.

== History ==
Founded in 1974 by retired US Navy Lieutenant commander Reverend Norman Randall Milbank. Prior to establishing Canterbury Rev. Milbank was the Bursar at Stanford University.

In addition to her husband’s work, Matilda Ann Hallock Milbank, a registered nurse and committed Christian, co-founded Canterbury Christian School and served as its principal for many years. Known for her dedication to both academic excellence and spiritual formation, she helped shape the school's curriculum and community life. She retired in 2010 at the age of 93.

== Academics ==
Canterbury offers a Classical liberal arts education from a traditional Christian perspective. Students study English as well as Latin and Greek using "traditional methods" such as phonics for teaching reading and cursive for penmanship from Abeka and Memoria Press. Math instruction is based on frequent cumulative review and employs material from Saxon Math and Singapore Math.

In a 2001 article, the *Los Altos Town Crier* reported that Canterbury had 112 students enrolled across grades K–6, with class sizes of about 16 students. Students wore red-and-tartan uniforms and were taught according to a "Christian world view," with the Bible presented as the foundational truth in all subjects.

== Technology philosophy ==
Canterbury has been popular with some Silicon Valley parents working in the technology sector in the United States, including those from some of the most advanced technology firms such as Google, Facebook, and VMware. Their low-tech approach has been featured internationally by the German News Agency (DPA) and Taiwan-based online newspaper Apple Daily.

== Spirituality ==
Canterbury is the parish school of Saint Paul's Anglican Church, Los Altos. Student enrollment is open to Christian and non-Christian families. Daily chapel services are based on the Anglican Book of Common Prayer. Canterbury students also participate in liturgical music events. In 2019, the school's choir joined with St. Andrew’s Academy to perform an Evensong service at St. Paul’s Anglican Church in Los Altos. The 45-minute service included traditional Scripture readings, the Nunc Dimittis, and the Magnificat, following the monastic-style liturgy of the Anglican Book of Common Prayer.
