= Canterbury High School (Accokeek, Maryland) =

High school in Accokeek, Maryland, US

Coordinates: 38°40′36″N 77°1′9″W

Information
- Established: 1961
- Closed: 2000

The Canterbury School also known as Canterbury High School and also simply as Canterbury, was a private, college preparatory secondary school located in Accokeek, Maryland, on the grounds of Christ Episcopal Church. It opened in 1961 and closed in 2000.

== Profile ==
- Program: The curriculum was strongly college preparatory in nature and many graduates from the school attended a number of the top Universities and Colleges in the nation. Many also entered highly skilled or technical professions, such as paramedics, firefighters, police officers, mechanics, technicians, craftspeople artists, business people, musicians etc.
- Enrollment: At the time of the closure of the school, 48 students were enrolled; during the 1970s the enrollment averaged about 85 students per year.
- Reputation for diversity and togetherness:The school integrated well before legally required busing occurred in the local public schools and although it had a diverse student body, it avoided the major race conflicts that were plaguing area public schools at the time. Canterbury had a reputation for togetherness in the 1970s and 80s while many of the area public schools in P.G. County were beset with racial conflict at the time.
- Military kids: Children of military families from nearby bases were always a presence in the school in significant numbers, including many children of veterans.
- Underprivileged programs: The school, for many years had funding from the National Urban League and for a long time, about a quarter of the students were from underprivileged backgrounds. Many went on to highly skilled professions or college.
- International students: A portion of the students came from the diplomatic community in Washington, D.C., whose parents were from countries all over the world.
- A mixture of city and suburban kids: The school also had a mix of kids from varied parts of the D.C. area: kids from Southeast Washington D.C. were well represented, and there were always kids from Georgetown, Northwest and other parts of the city. Suburban Prince Georges and Montgomery counties and the counties of Northern Virginia also made up a large percentage of students. There was always a good representation of kids from rural Southern Maryland (South of the school) as well. All of this further increased the overall diversity of the school.
- Student-teacher ratio: For many years the school employed on average about 10 teachers, along with a small 3 administrative and support staff. This meant an 8 to 1 student-teacher ratio in the 1970s (one of the best in the Washington D.C. area at the time). When the school began to struggle in the 1990s, the enrollment dropped, improving the student-teacher ratio even further, but also increasing the financial strain on the school.
- Grades offered: Grades 6 through 12
- Degree conferred: high school diploma

== History ==
For four decades the school was used for academics, athletics, and special events such as the school's fall Apple Festival (a popular Accokeek event).

During its golden years, Canterbury was a highly regarded institution in the region. Compared to other private secondary schools in the Washington, D.C. metropolitan area, Canterbury was inexpensive and a much less stressful commute for students living in the Maryland suburbs of D.C. Canterbury was well known for both its athletic and academic programs. Unfortunately, the school did not sustain this reputation and enrollment began to decline. While some speculate that this was due to racist reaction to population changes in the area, the true reason for its decline remains unclear.

Despite falling enrollment and an all-but-dissolved athletic program, Canterbury maintained efforts to restore itself. In the 1990s, however, questionable financial decisions and actions of the headmistress left the school in dire straits. Because of the school's progressive and liberal ideas, and declining attendance at its supporting parish, the school was suffering from a deficient budget. In the 1996-1997 school year, a new headmaster—Peter Meade, Ph.D.—was hired to attempt to salvage the failing school. The School was pulled out of debt within two years with support of the School's Board. Despite the support of the faculty, and headmaster, the financial situation of the school with the original school board's backing was irreparable. The Vestry of the Church (the board that governs the Church's affairs) changed in both philosophy and support for the school. This change made it difficult for the continued commitment of many of the school's board members and that of the Headmaster. One of the ten remaining teaching faculty left Canterbury during its final academic year, 1999-2000, due to its financial situation, forcing the headmaster to teach mathematics in addition to his administrative duties.

As the staff and the funds of the school continued to dwindle, the school issued a letter of closure to students and faculty in March 2000. The letter stated that the school couldn't continue to provide the quality education they had aimed for due to financial troubles, and that no contracts (staff or students) would be renewed for the 2000-2001 school year. Several meetings with students and parents followed, with several seniors making passionate arguments for the continuation of the school. A pledge drive was proposed but not executed, and in May 2000 the school held its final graduation ceremony. The Vestry of Christ Church in September 2000 issued a document describing the final circumstances of Canterbury's closing.

== Sources ==
- The Yearbook of the Canterbury School, 1999-2000
- Letter of Closure, March 2000
