= Canterbury School (Fort Wayne, Indiana) =

Prep school in Fort Wayne, Indiana, US

The Canterbury School

Location
- 3210 Smith Road and 5601 Covington Road; Fort Wayne, Indiana 46804; United States; 41°3′13.47″N 85°12′43.51″W

Information
- Type: Independent, College Preparatory
- Motto: Integritas in Omnibus (Integrity in all things)
- Religious affiliation: Christian
- Denomination: non denominational
- Established: 1977; 49 years ago
- Headmaster: Marie Leary
- Directors: Will Lingle (HS), Rob Westfall (MS), Dr. Elly Maconochie (LS & EC)
- Faculty: 140
- Teaching staff: 106
- Grades: Early Childhood - Grade 12
- Student to teacher ratio: 9:1
- Campus: suburban
- Campus size: 71 acres - two campuses
- Color
- Slogan: Artist. Athlete. Scholar.
- Song: Canterbury School Song
- Fight song: Canterbury Fight Song (to the tune of On Wisconsin)
- Athletics conference: IHSAA
- Sports: Boys and Girls Soccer, Boys and Girls Basketball, Boys and Girls Tennis, Boys and Girls Golf, Boys and Girls Track, Boys and Girls Cross Country, Boys and Girls Swim & Dive, Boys Baseball, Girls Softball, Girls Volleyball
- Mascot: Cavalier
- Team name: Canterbury Cavaliers
- Rival: Homestead Spartans, Blackhawk Christian Braves
- Accreditation: ISACS
- Newspaper: The Untitled Paper
- Yearbook: Excalibur
- Endowment: $13 million+
- Website: www.canterburyschool.org

Canterbury School is an independent, college preparatory day school for students aged 2 through Grade 12. The school is located in Fort Wayne, Indiana (U.S.). As of 2024, Canterbury School is ranked as the second-best private school in Indiana, and the best in the Fort Wayne area.

== History ==
Canterbury School was established in 1977 by several families and others. Initially located at Trinity Episcopal Church in downtown Fort Wayne, it started as a nondenominational, self-supported school with 89 students in kindergarten through grade 6. The school aimed to inspire and motivate students while instilling Christian values and morals, fostering an appreciation for the fine arts, developing foreign language skills, and maintaining high standards for teaching and learning. As Canterbury continued to grow, it quickly outgrew its church setting. In 1980, the school relocated to the vacant Fort Wayne Community Schools building on Covington Road.

When Jonathan Hancock became the fourth headmaster in 1983, he oversaw Canterbury's expansion to include grade 12. In 1987, the year Canterbury graduated its first seniors, the school expanded once again, opening a campus for grades 9 to 12 on Smith Road. Additionally, programs for students as young as 2 were added that year, providing educational opportunities for children of all ages.

In the 2007–2008 academic year, Canterbury School further expanded both campuses to accommodate its growing student body.

== Arts ==
Canterbury has established an Academy of the Arts program.

== Athletics ==
The boys' soccer team holds the record for IHSAA state championships at 7 championship teams, winning the state championship in 1997–98, 1998–99, and 2001–02 school years and winning Class A state championships in the 2011–12, 2012–13, 2017–18, and 2018-19 school years, while coming state runner-ups in 1996–97, 2002–03, and 2020–21 school years.

The boys' basketball team won the Indiana IHSAA 1A state title in 2023–24.

The girls' basketball team won the Class A state championships in the 2007–08, 2008–09, 2009–10, 2011–12, and 2012-13 school years and coming state runner-ups after being moved up to Class 2A in the 2013–14 and 2014-15 school years.

The girls' soccer team won Class A state championships in the 2014–15 and 2015-16 school years.

The girls' track team has won two individual 1600m state titles.

The tennis team had a boys' state runner-up doubles team in the 2005–06 school year and a girls' singles runner-up in the 2011–12 school year.

== See also ==
- List of high schools in Indiana
