= Canterbury University (Seychelles) =

Private university

- Type: Private University
- Established: 1974
- Location: Manchester, England
- Website: https://www.canterburyuniversity.com/

Canterbury University is a private degree-granting institution. According to its website, Canterbury University was established in 1974 in Hyde, Cheshire, Manchester, United Kingdom, and is an independent university that delivers various specialized scientific courses.

== History ==
Canterbury University originated from The Canterbury College of Business Studies, established in England in 1974. Initially operating as a Private Degree Granting Body with correspondence courses, it obtained full 'University Status' after changes in English law in 1988. Subsequently, an international consortium of private colleges acquired the university following a significant legal victory in Florida in 2009. To emphasize its international character, Canterbury University shifted from relying on The Republic of the Seychelles to a framework of transnational and international incorporation and agreements in January 2010. The university ensures adherence to relevant legislation and standards set by the International Organization for Standardization. Moreover, Canterbury University holds legal rights to the name "Canterbury University," asserting its independence from other degree-granting institutions with similar names.

== Legality ==
The legality of Canterbury University degrees was challenged in the United States in 2009, and the case took two years to prepare. It was ultimately dismissed in 27 minutes during trial, with the Judge ruling in favor of Canterbury University, declaring its degrees to be legally valid.
