= Redeemer Classical Academy =

Coordinates: 35.88°N 86.40°W

Redeemer Classical Academy is a private Christian school located in Murfreesboro, Tennessee, with a focus on Classical Christian education. Redeemer Classical Academy serves students in kindergarten through 12th grade. The school's main objective is to employ traditional Classical methods and curricula and a Christ-centered approach to all aspects of the school life through a rigorous academic course of study and Christian discipleship. Redeemer Classical Academy's motto is Omnia per Eum or "All Things through Him." Redeemer Classical Academy is a member of the Association of Classical and Christian Schools.
