= Federal Vision =

Theological controversy amongst Reformed Christian circles

The Federal Vision (also called Auburn Avenue Theology) is a line of Christian thought based in the United States. It is a Reformed evangelical theological approach that focuses on covenant theology, Trinitarian thinking, the sacraments of baptism and communion, biblical theology and typology, justification, and postmillennialism. The movement has been rejected by several denominations in the U.S., including the Presbyterian Church in America (PCA), the Orthodox Presbyterian Church (OPC), the United Reformed Churches in North America (URCNA), the Reformed Presbyterian Church in the United States (RPCUS) and the Orthodox Christian Reformed Churches.

A controversy arose in Reformed and Presbyterian circles in response to views expressed at a 2002 conference entitled The Federal Vision: An Examination of Reformed Covenantalism. The ongoing controversy involves several Reformed denominations including the Protestant Reformed Churches in America (PRCA), OPC, the PCA, the URCNA and the RPCUS.

== Influences ==
Proponents of Federal Vision theology view themselves as influenced by the Protestant Reformers, especially those responsible for drawing up the Westminster Confession.

They argue that the influences of their theology are not limited to the work of pre-Great Awakening writers, however. They find precedent for their beliefs through the Awakenings and up to the present day.

== History and controversy ==
In January 2002 Auburn Avenue Presbyterian Church (PCA) in Monroe, Louisiana (now Church of the Redeemer, West Monroe, Louisiana), hosted its annual pastors' conference with speakers Douglas Wilson, John Barach, Steve Wilkins, and Steve Schlissel addressing the topic "The Federal Vision: An Examination of Reformed Covenantalism." The organizers and speakers intended the conference to provide a positive covenantal (i.e., federal) view (i.e., vision) of issues such as assurance of salvation and child-rearing. In June 2002, the RPCUS, a small Presbyterian denomination, issued a public call for repentance to the four speakers, charging them with "a fundamental denial of the essence of the Christian Gospel in the denial of justification by faith alone" and with "introducing false hermeneutic principles; the infusion of sacerdotalism; and the redefinition of [certain] doctrines..." As a result of this response and further debate and discussion regarding the conference teaching, the theological views presented at the conference came to be known as Federal Vision theology or Auburn Avenue theology.

In addition to the original four conference speakers, a number of men have identified themselves as proponents of Federal Vision theology by signing a document entitled "A Joint Federal Vision Profession." Signers include Randy Booth, Tim Gallant, Mark Horne, James B. Jordan, Peter Leithart, Rich Lusk, and Ralph A. Smith. A number of these men have particular areas of theological interest. For instance, Gallant writes mostly on paedocommunion, and Smith on the Trinity. As of 2017, Douglas Wilson no longer identifies with the Federal Vision label, though he stated that the change "...does not represent any substantial shift or sea change in the content of what I believe."

Those who oppose Federal Vision theology include E. Calvin Beisner, R. Scott Clark, Ligon Duncan, David Engelsma, J. V. Fesko, Michael Horton, Joseph Pipa, John Robbins, Brian Schwertley, Morton H. Smith, David Van Drunen and Guy Waters.

=== Ecclesiastical responses ===
In addition to the RPCUS's 2002 response, several other Reformed and Presbyterian denominations have ruled on the orthodoxy of Federal Vision or are in the process of doing so:

- In 2006, The Orthodox Presbyterian Church's "Report on Justification" did "not condemn all of the views of those mentioned herein [but] does agree that aberrant views on justification have been promulgated from within these circles," and it reaffirmed its commitment to the traditional understanding of the doctrine of justification and offered a critique of the Federal Vision.
- In 2007, the Presbyterian Church in America (PCA) appointed a study committee to examine the issue, and that committee produced a report which "is to be given due and serious consideration by the church and its courts" concluding that the teachings of Federal Vision on election, justification, and other doctrines are contrary to the Westminster Standards, the PCA's doctrinal standards.
- In June 2009, the Reformed Church in the United States rejected Federal Vision theology as not being in accordance with its doctrinal standards.
- At the 2010 Synod, the URCNA passed a 60-page report condemning Federal Vision as heresy.

In reply to these denominational criticisms, several Federal Vision proponents developed and signed a "Joint Federal Vision Profession," which briefly outlines what they affirm and what they deny in each of the controverted areas. Auburn Avenue Presbyterian Church, the church at which the original 2002 conference was held, has revised and republished its statement on "Covenant, Baptism, and Salvation," which they state was "not intended to erect some new standard of orthodoxy or to imply that we were settled on these points and could not be challenged or dissuaded from them, and it was certainly not intended to erect another wall to divide the Church or as a means to denounce or exclude from fellowship our brothers who might disagree with us," and that it was "a response to the critique and instruction we have received and is an effort to make our position more clear and (we trust) more easily understood. We continue to study and learn and continue to be open to further correction and instruction."

== General beliefs ==
The leading proponents of Federal Vision theology are Reformed, and consider their understanding of Christian theology to be, with some exceptions, in keeping with major Reformed confessions—namely, the Three Forms of Unity and the Westminster Confession of Faith. The following subsections outline the distinctives and particular emphases of the Federal Vision as outlined in the "Joint Federal Vision Statement".

=== Trinity ===
Proponents of the Federal Vision believe the trinitarian relationships among the Godhead to be the model for all covenantal relationships and the foundation for understanding the Christian Bible. In line with Cornelius Van Til and R. J. Rushdoony, they claim that the Trinity is the only acceptable solution to the philosophical "one and many problem". Their trinitarian theology influences all areas of their theology, particularly their view of the biblical covenants.

=== Postmillennial eschatology ===
Advocates of the Federal Vision believe that Jesus will not physically return to Earth until it is as "full of the knowledge of the Lord as the waters cover the sea" (Habakkuk 2:14), which postmillennialists believe refers to the conversion of the majority of the world to Christianity. While this is consistent with postmillennial doctrine, not all Federal Visionists are postmillennials.

=== Covenant objectivity ===
The central distinctive of the Federal Vision is its view of the covenants. In keeping with the historic Reformed understanding of covenant theology, Federal Vision proponents argue that God has made two covenants with humankind throughout history: the first was pre-fall of man and the second was post-fall. The second covenant was progressively expanded throughout the Old Testament (Hebrew Bible) in various advanced covenants (Noahic, Abrahamic, Mosaic, and Davidic), and reached its climax with Jesus and the so-called New Covenant.

What distinguishes the Federal Vision from other interpretations of covenant theology is its view of the nature of the covenant—namely that the covenant is "objective" and that all covenant members are part of God's family, whether or not they are decretally elect.

The Federal Vision position on covenants stems from a mix of so-called "covenant objectivity" and Calvinist theology regarding God's predestination of each soul. Because Federal Vision thinkers believe the Hebrew Bible argued for corporate election of all Israel, so too does the New Testament argue for the election of souls in the Christian Church. This results in a distinction in election: there are the decreed elect (that precise number God intends to save and who will persevere in their faith) and the covenantally elect (those who are predestined to be a follower of Jesus for a time, but are not predestined to persevere in their faith and who will eventually fall away). Rich Lusk writes:

If we oversimplify, we can say that election relates to God’s eternal plan to save a people for himself. The number of the elect is fixed from eternity past and may not be increased or diminished. The covenant is God’s administration of salvation in space and time, the historical outworking of his eternal plan. We have then two basic perspectives, the decretal/eternal and the covenantal/historical, through which to view salvation. To do full justice to the biblical teaching, we must distinguish covenant and election without separating them. Sometimes scripture simply conflates the elect and the covenant body, such as in Ephesians 1:3 and 2 Thessalonians 2:13. Other times, Scripture distinguishes the elect from the covenant community, such as when the biblical writers warn that some within the covenant will fall away (Romans 11, 1 Corinthians 10). To follow the Biblical model, we must view our fellow church members as elect and regenerate and threaten them with the dangers of falling away. This is not contradictory because we admit we only have a creaturely knowledge of God’s decree. We can never, in this life, know with absolute certainty, who the elect are. So we have to make evaluations and declarations in terms of what has been revealed, namely the covenant (Deuteronomy 29:29).

Lusk goes on to speak of apostates within the covenant:

God has decreed from the foundation of the world all that comes to pass, including who would be saved and lost for all eternity. Included in his decree, however, is that some persons, not destined for final salvation, would be drawn to Christ and to his people for a time. These people, for a season, enjoy real blessings, purchased for them by Christ’s cross and applied to them by the Holy Spirit through Word and Sacrament. ...They may be said to be reconciled to God, adopted, granted new life, etc. But in the end, they fail to persevere, and because they fall away, they go to hell.

Proponents of the Federal Vision claim to reflect the authentic views of John Calvin on election and covenantal objectivity, citing Calvin's distinction between common election and special election: "Although the common election is not effectual in all, yet may it set open a gate for the special elect." Calvin wrote concerning effectual calling,

Besides this [universal call] there is a special call which, for the most part, God bestows on believers only, when by the internal illumination of the Spirit he causes the word preached to take deep root in their hearts. Sometimes, however, he communicates it also to those whom he enlightens only for a time, and whom afterwards, in just punishment for their ingratitude, he abandons and smites with greater blindness.

— John Calvin, Institutes of the Christian Religion, v.xxv-p31 III:24.8

Advocates of the Federal Vision believe that in the covenant, God promises certain blessings for faithful living, and promises curses for unfaithful living (based on Deuteronomy 28), which makes the covenant objective. Once a person has entered the covenant through baptism, he cannot escape its consequences. If, through unbelief, he lives a life unfaithful to the covenant or abandons it, he will be subject to God's curses and displeasure.

=== Baptism ===
Proponents of the Federal Vision have a view of baptism that they argue returns to the beliefs of the original Reformers, particularly John Calvin. This baptismal view is different from both Roman Catholic and contemporary Protestant beliefs on baptism. Douglas Wilson writes:

In a sacrament we have a covenantal union between the sign and the thing signified. The Roman Catholic position destroys the possibility of having a sacrament through identifying the sign with the thing signified. The modern evangelical position destroys the definition of a sacrament through divorcing the sign and the thing signified. In this position, the sign is a mere memorial of that to which it points, and thus there can be no sacramental union between the two.

— Douglas Wilson, Mother Kirk: Essays and Forays in Practical Ecclesiology, p. 93

To them, baptism is the entrance into both the covenant and the Christian Church. As a result of the covenantal union between the act of baptism and the work of the Holy Spirit, Federal Vision advocates affirm a form of baptismal regeneration that they argue is a return to Calvin's thought and the teachings of the historically Reformed.

Obviously, for Reformed Christians, the ultimate test of any doctrine is its fidelity to the whole counsel of God, revealed in the pages of Scripture. What does the Bible actually teach about the efficacy of baptism? ...In baptism, We are united (or married) to the crucified, buried, and risen Christ (Romans 6:1ff), though we can be cut off (or divorced) from him if we are unfaithful (Romans 11:17ff; cf. John 15:1ff), We are forgiven (Acts 2:38, 22:16; cf. the Nicene Creed), We receive the Holy Spirit (Acts 2:38), We are cleansed (Ephesians 5:26), We are regenerated and renewed (Titus 3:5), We are buried and resurrected with Christ (Col. 2:11–12), We are circumcised in heart (Col. 2:11–12), We are joined to the body of Christ (1 Cor. 12:13), We are clothed with Christ (Gal. 3:27), We are justified and sanctified (1 Cor. 6:11), We are saved (1 Pt. 3:20–21), We are ordained as priests with access to the heavenly sanctuary (Heb. 10:19–22). Of course, the ultimate proof of baptism's efficacy rests in the baptism of Jesus himself. Here, we have the ultimate paradigm for understanding God's work in baptism. Jesus received the Spirit in fullness at his baptism, and was declared to be the beloved Son of the Father. With appropriate qualifications, this is what God does in our baptisms as well: He pours out his Spirit upon us and declares us to be his dearly loved children. In context, none of these passages teach baptism automatically guarantees salvation. But they do teach that God does a great work in baptism, a work that may be considered the beginnings [sic] of salvation for those God has elected to persevere to the end.

This point has generated much controversy and confusion, because the advocates of the Federal Vision do not mean regeneration as the term is used today. Instead, they claim to employ the original sense of the word used by the reformers. Louis Berkhof writes, "Calvin also used the term [regeneration] in a very comprehensive sense as a designation of the whole process by which man is renewed." Critics point out, however, that all the benefits of believing in Jesus are associated with baptism by Federal Vision writers. Critics believe this teaching aligns them more closely with Lutheran views of baptism.

Using this definition of regeneration, the Federal Vision position is that physical and spiritual baptism should be seen as a unity normally. Rich Lusk writes,

In Calvin's Strasbourg catechism, he asks the student "How do you know yourself to be a son of God in fact as well as in name?" The answer is "Because I am baptized in the name of God the Father, and of the Son, and of the Holy Ghost." In his Geneva catechism, he asks, "Is baptism nothing more than a mere symbol [i.e., picture] of cleansing?" The answer: "I think it to be such a symbol that the reality is attached to it. For God does not disappoint us when he promises us his gifts. Hence, both pardon of sins and newness of life are certainly offered and received by us in baptism." Early on in his discussion of baptism in the Institutes, Calvin claims, "We must realize that at whatever time we are baptized, we are once for all washed and purged for our whole life. Therefore, as often as we fall away, we ought to recall the memory of our baptism and fortify our mind with it, that we may always be sure and confident of the forgiveness of sins." Essentially, Calvin could say, "You know you are renewed and forgiven because you have been baptized." Elsewhere, Calvin wrote, "It is a thing out of all controversy true, that we put on Christ in baptism, and were baptized on this very ground, that we should be one with him."

In his concluding analysis of the Federal Vision baptismal theology, Joseph Minich—who claims not to be a Federal Vision advocate—writes, "Baptism is not a 'work' performed, after which one can have full assurance. It is not another 'instrument' of justification alongside faith. Rather, it is a visible act of God (especially apparent in the case of infants) that is to be seen as the locus of Christian certainty. It is the place where God promises to meet His own. To look to baptism for assurance is not to look for salvation in 'water,' but to cling to the place where God promises to meet His people and bless them."

Those associated with the Federal Vision often include under the name "Christian" all who have been baptized in the name of the trinitarian God.

=== Communion ===
The Federal Vision emphasizes the blessings from partaking in communion as the nourishing feast of the covenant. While denying both mere symbolism and the presence of Jesus in the elements themselves, they believe that Jesus's presence with the church in the sacrament has sanctifying effects.

Advocates of the Federal Vision are proponents of paedocommunion, the indiscriminate distribution of the communion to all infants and children of church members. They argue that accepting infants and small children to the communion table was the classic Christian position until the 14th century, and that all covenant members, including infants, should be admitted to the table unless they are under formal church discipline.

Paedocommunion is not an exclusively Federal Vision position. Non-Federal Vision Reformed advocates of paedocommunion include C. John Collins, Curtis Crenshaw, Christian Reconstructionist Gary North, and Andrew Sandlin. Non-Reformed evangelical supporters include William Henry Willimon and N. T. Wright.

Opponents of paedocommunion argue that the practice is not in keeping with classical Calvinist theology. They note that traditional Reformed teaching and practice require a communicant to be capable of self-examination, according to Paul the Apostle's teaching in 1 Corinthians 11.

Calvin specifically rejects paedocommunion in chapter 16 of book four of the Institutes of the Christian Religion.

=== Salvation ===
According to R. Scott Clark, the Federal Vision movement distinguishes between initial justification by faith alone and final justification "through faith and works or faith and faithfulness." Likewise, in the sacrament of baptism, "all the benefits of Christ (i.e., election, effectual calling, regeneration, faith, union with Christ, and adoption) are given but must be retained by grace and cooperation with grace."

=== Biblical theology and typology ===
One of the foundational distinctives of the Federal Vision movement is the method they use to interpret the Christian Bible. Rather than treating hermeneutics as a science or a method, they consider it more of an intuitive art. Rich Lusk says,

Biblical Theology is really an art. Like other skills of this sort, it is not a matter of following rules (though there are certainly guidelines and techniques). Rather, it’s [a] matter of ‘practice makes perfect.’ Peter Enns describes it well in a thought-provoking question: ‘What if biblical interpretation is not guided so much by method but by an intuitive, Spirit-led engagement of Scripture with the anchor being not what the author intended but by how Christ gives the OT [Old Testament] its final coherence?’ The coming of Christ led the apostles to practice new patterns of exegesis, centered on their conviction that the eschatological age had been inaugurated. It is foolish to think we can get our doctrine from the apostles without also employing their hermeneutic.

— Rich Lusk, the Art of Biblical Theology

Biblical theology methods of interpretation do not treat the Christian Bible as a collection of facts and doctrines as systematic theology does. Rather, it treats the Christian Bible as a great story of God's redemptive and transformative purposes in the world for the world. Thus, interpreting the Christian Bible through the typological system means emphasizing literary analysis and the flow of the overarching narrative through each of the smaller, individual stories.

This method of interpretation has been around since the Church Fathers, and writers such as Geerhardus Vos and other 19th-century Presbyterian theologians have contributed to the present Presbyterian understanding. In 19th-century German Protestantism, typological interpretation was distinguished from the rectilinear interpretation of prophecy. The former was associated with Hegelian theologians and the latter with Kantian analyticity. In the 20th century, typological interpretation was fleshed out by David Chilton and Meredith G. Kline, but especially by theologian James B. Jordan, whose books on typology (such as Through New Eyes), and the commentaries of Peter Leithart serve as the interpretive foundations for the Federal Vision theology.

Adherents of the Federal Vision often make use of and recommend the general interpretive works of Sidney Greidanus, Christopher J. H. Wright, Richard Gaffin, N. T. Wright, Stanley Hauerwas, George Stroup, Richard Hays, Rikk Watts, Willard Swartley, Sylvia Keesmaat, Ben Witherington, J Ross Wagner, Don Garlington, Craig Evans, Steve Moyise, and David Pao.

Typological hermeneutics are not mentioned explicitly in the "Joint Federal Vision Statement".

=== Imputation ===
Another controversial aspect of the Federal Vision theology is the denial of the imputation of Jesus's active obedience in his earthly life. Theologians involved with the Federal Vision disagree on the denial of imputation. James Jordan has denied that any part of Jesus's earthly works is imparted to believers. Norman Shepherd agrees with him. Peter Leithart has publicly said in a letter to the PCA Pacific Northwest Presbytery that:

This is an issue I am still thinking about, and on which I don’t have a settled position. I affirm that Christ’s obedience was necessary for our salvation, and affirm too that Christ’s history of obedience becomes the life story of those who are in Christ. I’m not sure that ‘imputation’ is the best way to express this. It’s not clear to me that the Westminster Standards require belief in the imputation of Christ’s active obedience.

— Peter Leithart, Letter to the Stated Clerk

Rich Lusk’s position seems to be the closest to a representative position for the Federal Vision theologians as a whole. First, he does not deny Jesus's active obedience:

There is no question the perfect obedience of Jesus played a vital role in his salvific work on our behalf. If he had sinned, he would have fallen under God’s wrath and curse just like us, and wouldn’t have been [...] able to rescue us. ...So his active obedience is necessary to guarantee the efficacy and worth of his death and to guarantee his resurrection on the other side.

Similarly, James Jordan writes "that there is a double imputation of our sins to Jesus and His glory to us is certainly beyond question, and I am not disagreeing with the general doctrine of imputation, or of double imputation."

The Federal Vision proponents question whether Jesus's earthly works benefit humans. Jordan says:

Merit theology often assumes that Jesus' earthly works and merits are somehow given to us, and there is no foundation for this notion. It is, in fact, hard to comprehend what is meant by it. What does it have to do with my life that Jesus raised Lazarus from the dead and this good deed is given to me? The miracles that Jesus did were not required of me to satisfy God's justice. ...There seems to be nothing in the Bible to imply that we receive Jesus’ earthly life and then also his death. His earthly life was ‘for us’ in the sense that it was the precondition for his death, but it is not given ‘to us.’

— James B. Jordan, "Merit or Maturity: What Did Jesus Do For Us?" in The Federal Vision

Lusk agrees:

Surely God does not require everyone to work as a carpenter or to turn water into wine or raise a twelve-year-old girl from the dead. These works were not accumulating points that would be credited to Jesus' people; rather, they were vocation fulfilling acts that prepared the way for the "one Man's righteous act" namely his death on the cross.

Rather, the Federal Vision theologians see believers as being in "union with Christ," as partaking of Jesus's resurrection, rather than believers getting righteousness credit given to them. Lusk again:

The resurrection is the real centerpiece of the gospel since it is the new thing God has done. ...It is not Christ's life-long obedience per se that is credited to us. Rather, it is his right standing before the Father, manifested in his resurrection. His resurrection justified us because it justified him. Again, it is not that his law-keeping or miracle-working are imputed to our account; rather, Christ shares his legal status in God's court with us as the One who propitiated God's wrath on the cross and was resurrected into a vindicated, glorified form of life.

Lusk compares this "union with Christ" with the analogy:

Suppose a woman is in deep, deep debt and has no means at her disposal to pay it off. Along comes an ultra wealthy prince charming. Out of grace and love, he decides to marry her. He covers her debt. But then he has a choice to make about how he will care for his bride. After canceling out her debt, will he fill up her account with his money? That is to say, will he transfer or impute his own funds into an account that bears her name? Or will he simply make his own account a joint account so it belongs to both of them? In the former scenario, there is an imputation, a transfer. In the second scenario, the same final result is attained, but there is no imputation, strictly speaking. Rather, there is a real union, a marriage.

Both Andrew Sandlin and Norman Shepherd agree that union with Jesus's resurrection, rather than the imputation of his earthly obedient works, is how sinners are justified before God.

Despite internal disagreement on the matter, Federal Vision theologians agree that:

[w]hat matters is that we confess that our salvation is all of Christ, and not from us.

== Federal Vision and the New Perspective on Paul ==
Some critics of Federal Vision theology have connected it with the New Perspective on Paul. Federal Vision proponents have sought to maintain a distinction between the two theologies while acknowledging that they do have some general ideas in common. Yet many critics of the Federal Vision still group the two movements together. Outspoken critic Guy Waters notes:

While there is, to be sure, some overlap between the concerns of the NPP and the concerns of the FV, it is not accurate to describe them as a single movement. They properly represent different theological traditions and different constituencies, and have separate aims and objectives. Although the label "New Perspective on Paul" appears to have gained some currency within the church, it seems wisest to reserve this to describe the academic movement formally launched by E. P. Sanders and sustained by James D. G. Dunn and N. T. Wright.

— Guy Waters, The Federal Vision and Covenant Theology, pp. 2–3

Proponent James B. Jordan says similarly,

For some reason mysterious to me, the association of the FV speakers with the NPP has stuck, even though there are no grounds for it. Those of us being called FV have been discussing these issues for 25 years, long before any of us had ever heard of Tom Wright. Almost all the issues that are being shrieked about were set out in writings published by me and my associates at Geneva Ministries during the 1980s in issues of the journal Christianity and Civilization.

— James B. Jordan, in Biblical Horizons, number 177

Douglas Wilson has noted six foundational tenets of the NPP. He affirms the correctness of points 1–3.

1. Justification by faith was present in the Old Testament as well as the New Testament.
2. Faith and works are not opposed to one another in the Bible. Faith was always present, even in the Old Testament. The Jews were not trying to earn anything by works.
3. Law and grace are not opposed to one another, or that the Old Testament was mostly law and the New Testament was mostly grace.
4. Paul's primary focus was not individual salvation, but corporate salvation.
5. Judaism was not a religion based on salvation by works or merit.
6. Judaism satisfied Paul's burden of guilt; rather than what the Old Perspective thought, that Judaism could not ease Paul's conscience.

Most of the Federal Vision proponents have publicly said they appreciate much of what NT Wright has written. Both Mark Horne and Rich Lusk have defended Wright against his Reformed critics. Horne has said that the NPP "is not a rejection of the Reformed doctrine." Lusk has said virtually the same thing, saying that Wright "is a true sola scriptura Protestant." Douglas Wilson has called Wright a "Christian gentleman" who "has a lot to contribute," and has commended Wright's insistence that Paul is a "thorough-going covenant theologian," but has also leveled criticism at Wright:

I believe that NT Wright has many particular things of great value to offer the Church. But it is here, in his treatment of the unconverted Saul, that I think his entire project (taken as a whole) goes astray. The converted Saul had a much lower estimate of his pre-Christian activities than do many advocates of the NPP. ...But after his conversion, Saul described himself as a wicked and insolent man. I have no doubt that Saul was looking forward to the vindication of God for all Torah-keepers like himself. But when God did intervene, it was to reveal that Saul was actually a Torah-breaker. On the Damascus road, Saul discovered more than who Jesus was. He discovered who Saul was—an evil man, and one who in substance and at the fundamental level, despised and hated the Torah.

— Douglas Wilson, Saul as Torah-Breaker

Peter Leithart, Steve Wilkins and Steve Schlissel share similarities theologically with the NPP, though they have not publicly said they have consciously shaped their theology after Wright's. Leithart, however, has said that Federal Vision theology "is stimulated by Anglican New Testament scholar NT Wright..."
