= Blackthorn Winter =

Blackthorn Winter may refer to:

- a spell of cold weather in the month of May in rural England coinciding with the appearance of blackthorns; see Ice Saints
- Blackthorn Winter (Reiss novel), a 2006 novel by Kathryn Reiss
- Blackthorn Winter (Wilson novel), a 2003 novel by Douglas Wilson
