= Collision (2009 film) =

- Directed by: Darren Doane
- Produced by: David Hagopian; Gary DeMar; Josh Karchmer
- Starring: Christopher Hitchens; Douglas Wilson
- Distributed by: LEVEL4
- Release date: October 27, 2009
- Running time: 90 minutes
- Country: United States
- Language: English

Collision is an American documentary film by Darren Doane released on October 27, 2009. It features a debate between prominent antitheist Christopher Hitchens and Douglas Wilson, a pastor of Christ Church, a CREC church located in Moscow, Idaho. Described by Hitchens as a "buddy-and-road" movie, it provides an overview of several days' worth of debates following the release of their book Is Christianity Good for the World? The book was generated by correspondence published in the magazine Christianity Today.

== Production ==
The partnership between Hitchens and Wilson began in 2007, when Hitchens invited anyone to debate his viewpoints, following the release of his book God is not Great. Wilson's agent heard the offer and put him in touch with Hitchens, leading to a series of written debates published in Christianity Today, which eventually were compiled into the book Is Christianity Good for the World?. Filmmaker Darren Doane heard about the exchanges between the two and sought them out to make a film. The film was featured on CNN, Fox News; NPR; The Laura Ingraham Show and others.

After the men finally met in person while shooting the film, both got along well, despite their heated exchanges, in part because of a shared appreciation for P. G. Wodehouse.

== Reception ==
Hitchens said in Slate magazine, "I haven't yet run into an argument that has made me want to change my mind... However, I have discovered that the so-called Christian right is much less monolithic, and very much more polite and hospitable, than I would once have thought, or than most liberals believe."

Wilson argued that atheists could be good people, could share Christian values and Christians could repudiate many things atheists also repudiated. He also argued that atheists could not argue for an objective moral standard but could affirm a standard, if it happened to exist, that of "eat, drink and be merry for tomorrow maybe we die", but no other.
