= Communion of Reformed Evangelical Churches =

Christian denomination

- Abbreviation: CREC
- Classification: Protestant
- Orientation: Reformed
- Theology: Evangelical
- Polity: Presbyterian
- Presiding Minister: Bill Smith
- Region: United States; Canada; Australia; Japan; Russia; Hungary; Ukraine; Bulgaria; Poland; Brazil; Czech Republic; Jersey
- Origin: 1998; 28 years ago
- Congregations: 171
- Members: 25,000 to 30,000
- Other names: Confederation of Reformed Evangelicals; Confederation of Reformed Evangelical Churches
- Official website: crechurches.org

The Communion of Reformed Evangelical Churches (CREC), formerly the Confederation of Reformed Evangelical Churches, was founded in 1998 as a body of churches that hold to Reformed theology. Member churches include those from Presbyterian, Continental Reformed, and Reformed Baptist backgrounds. The CREC has over a hundred member churches in the United States, Canada, Australia, Japan, Russia, Hungary, Ukraine, Bulgaria, Poland, Brazil, Jersey, and the Czech Republic. These are organised into nine presbyteries, named after figures in church history: Anselm, Athanasius, Augustine, Bucer, Hus, Knox, Kuyper, Tyndale, and Wycliffe.

== History ==
The denomination began in 1998 as the Confederation of Reformed Evangelicals (CRE). The founding churches were Community Evangelical Fellowship in Moscow, Idaho; Eastside Evangelical Fellowship (Trinity Church) in Bellevue, Washington; and Wenatchee Evangelical Fellowship in Wenatchee, Washington. Its co-founders include Douglas Wilson.

The name was changed to the Confederation of Reformed Evangelical Churches in 2004, and then, in 2011, to the Communion of Reformed Evangelical Churches.

As of 2020, the CREC was estimated to have around 15,000 members. According to World magazine, the CREC "grew rapidly during the pandemic, due to its staunch opposition to COVID-19 restrictions."

== Doctrine ==
The Communion of Reformed Evangelical Churches holds to Reformed theology as set forth in the Westminster Standards, Three Forms of Unity, and 1689 Baptist Confession of Faith. On some doctrines, such as the Federal Vision, paedocommunion, and paedobaptism, the CREC allows each church to determine its own position. The Communion of Reformed Evangelical Churches requires that all member churches adopt a statement of faith including the Apostles' Creed, the Nicene Creed, and the Definition of Chalcedon, and at least one of the following historic confessions:

- Westminster Confession of Faith (1647)
- American Westminster Confession of Faith (1789)
- The Three Forms of Unity:
  - Belgic Confession (1561)
  - Heidelberg Catechism (1563)
  - Canons of Dort (1619)
- The London Baptist Confession (1689)
- The Savoy Declaration (1658)
- Second Helvetic Confession (1566)
- 39 Articles (1571)
- The Reformed Evangelical Confession

The CREC rejects both modernism and fundamentalism. It has published a number of "memorials", which among other things affirm Young Earth creationism, deprecate government schooling, and reject women in combat. While non-partisan, CREC churches are "uniformly hostile to the leftist agenda". They generally accept the doctrine of sphere sovereignty. According to Agence France-Presse, the CREC "holds deeply conservative, patriarchal views about family, society and the role of religion in politics," including that "America was founded as a Christian nation". Samuel Perry, writing for The Conversation, suggests that "CREC churches adhere to a highly patriarchal and conservative interpretation of Scripture." According to religion scholar Julie Ingersoll, the CREC is strongly influenced by Christian Reconstructionism.

The CREC includes adherents of Federal Vision theology.

== Worship and government ==
Paedocommunion is a CREC distinctive, and churches generally practise covenant renewal worship. Household voting is common, and some CREC pastors have advocated for repealing the Nineteenth Amendment to the United States Constitution in favor of household voting as well.

== Resources ==
- New Saint Andrews College
- Theopolis Institute
- Canon Press

== Notable members ==
- Pete Hegseth, 29th United States Secretary of Defense (2025-present)
- Peter Leithart, president of the Theopolis Institute for Biblical, Liturgical, & Cultural Studies
- Rich Lusk, pastor of Trinity Presbyterian Church
- Isaiah P. Taylor, chief executive officer of Valar Atomics (2023-present)
- Steve Wilkins, American pastor and author
- Douglas Wilson, pastor of Christ Church
- N. D. Wilson, American young adult fiction, children's literature, and Christian apologetics author
