= Infant communion =

Practice of giving infants and young children the Eucharist

Infant communion, also known as paedocommunion, refers to the practice of giving the Eucharist, often in the form of consecrated wine mingled with consecrated bread, to young children. This practice is standard throughout Eastern Christianity, where communion is given at the Divine Liturgy to all baptized and chrismated church members regardless of age. Infant communion is less common in most of Western Christianity.

== Theology ==
Support for infant communion is drawn from several gospel verses, including Matthew 19:14 and Mark 10:14. Among the Church Fathers, Cyprian, Augustine, and Leo the Great explicitly favored infant communion.

== History ==
In the Early Church, everyone who attended the Liturgy of the Faithful was expected to receive communion; catechumens and penitents were not present for the consecration. The Early Church permitted and encouraged parents to present their children to receive communion. The Apostolic Constitutions (4th century) instruct that children are to receive communion after the various orders of clergy and consecrated laity and before the general congregation.

With no practical difficulties or theological qualms with giving communion to young children, this practice continues in the Eastern Orthodox Church to this day.

== Catholicism ==
The practice of allowing young children to receive communion has fallen into disfavor in the Latin-Rite of the Catholic Church. Latin-Rite Catholics generally refrain from infant communion and instead have a special ceremony when the child receives his or her First Communion, usually around the age of seven or eight years old. This is in accordance with the Code of Canon Law (followed in the Roman Rite), which states:

The administration of the Most Holy Eucharist to children requires that they have sufficient knowledge and careful preparation so that they understand the mystery of Christ according to their capacity and are able to receive the body of Christ with faith and devotion.

— Canon 913

The reason given for the non-necessity of infant communion was articulated by the Council of Trent:

The same holy council teaches that little children who have not attained the use of reason are not by any necessity bound to the sacramental communion of the Eucharist; for having been regenerated by the laver of baptism and thereby incorporated with Christ, they cannot at that age lose the grace of the sons of God already acquired. Antiquity is not therefore to be condemned, however, if in some places it at one time observed that custom. For just as those most holy Fathers had acceptable ground for what they did under the circumstances, so it is certainly to be accepted without controversy that they regarded it as not necessary to salvation.

— Council of Trent, Sess. XXI, chap. iv

Thus, the Council declared:

If anyone says that communion of the Eucharist is necessary for little children before they have attained the years of discretion, let him be anathema.

— Council of Trent, Sess. XXI, can. iv

Formerly, the Eastern Churches in full communion with the Roman Pope were generally required to conform to Western Church practice, in violation of the far more ancient practice of the Eastern Churches. However, the Second Vatican Council's decree Orientalium Ecclesiarum, although not specifically addressing infant communion, states that the Council "confirms and approves the ancient discipline of the sacraments existing in the Oriental Churches, as also the ritual practices connected with their celebration and administration and ardently desires that this should be re-established if circumstances warrant it" (Section 12).

This has led some of these Churches to restore the ancient practice of permitting infant communion.

The Code of Canons of the Eastern Churches (followed by the Eastern Catholic Churches) permits infant communion:

With respect to the participation of infants in the Divine Eucharist after baptism and chrismation with holy myron, the prescriptions of the liturgical books of each Church sui iuris are to be observed with the suitable due precautions

— Canon 710

== Eastern Orthodoxy ==
In the Orthodox Church, any person of any age receives communion as soon as possible after baptism and chrismation, usually at the next Divine Liturgy. Young children are not usually required to fast or go to confession before communion until they are old enough to be aware of their sins, usually eight to nine years old.

In the Orthodox practice, the consecrated bread and wine are placed together in the chalice, and the priest administers communion with a small spoon. Infants typically receive a small amount of consecrated Blood of Christ (wine), which mingles with the Body (bread) of Christ; older children receive the consecrated Body of Christ (bread) as well. There is no theological (or epistemological) reason for withholding the bread from infants; it is merely the practical concern of not giving solid food to those not ready for it.

== Lutheranism ==
Infant communion is not the norm in the Lutheran Church. At most churches in the ELCA (as well as nearly 25% in the LCMS), First Communion instruction is provided to baptized children generally between the ages of 6–8 and, after a relatively short period of catechetical instruction, the children are admitted to partake of the Eucharist. In some LCMS churches, however, the person must have receive Confirmation before receiving the Eucharist. As a whole, the ELCA teaches that the gift of communion is given at baptism; it is just that some more conservative churches choose to keep a tradition that children should be more aware of what communion means before they partake. Young children can receive holy communion in the ELCA and some European Lutheran bodies along with those who haven't received the catechetical instruction (or Confirmation) may be brought to the communion distribution by their parents to be blessed by the pastor.

The Evangelical Catholic Church, a now defunct denomination whose theology was partially based on Lutheranism (although also with some influence from Catholicism and Eastern Orthodoxy), differed from most Lutherans in embracing the practice of infant communion.

Martin Luther's Table Talk recorded his thoughts on the subject:

It was asked, did the Hussites well in administering the sacrament to young children, on the allegation that the graces of God apply equally to all human creatures? Dr. Luther replied: they were undoubtedly wrong, since young children need not the communion for their salvation; but still the innovation could not be regarded as a sin of the Hussites, since St Cyprian, long ago, set them the example.

== Anglicanism ==
Practice varies widely throughout the Anglican Communion and among those Anglican churches that are not affiliated with the Anglican Communion. Open communion is practiced in some churches. The Church of England at the moment requires that people be "ready and desirous" of confirmation before receiving communion. However, there have been experiments with communion before confirmation in some of its dioceses. The Church of England also allows baptised regular communicants from other Trinitarian churches to receive communion when visiting a CofE church. This permission would seem, therefore, to extend to infants in the practice of receiving in their own churches; but in many of the world's Anglican churches the invitation so extended includes a specific reference to "adult" visitors.

== Other denominations ==
Many Mainline Protestants practice open communion, in which the bread and wine/juice is offered to the people without discrimination of age or denominational status. In these churches, while the very young often commune, it is unusual for infants to receive the Eucharist.

Denominations which practice closed communion generally deny the Eucharist to those not members of their congregation or denomination, regardless of age.

In churches where membership is often not permitted until the teenage years (for example, Anabaptist groups such as the Amish), infant communion is not practiced. Some churches may have a substitute for children (grapes and pretzels, for example), though this is typically considered not truly equivalent to communion.

In recent years, the Eastern practice of paedocommunion has gained considerable attention in the West, including among some conservative Protestants.

Notable conservative Protestants in favor of the practice are Peter Leithart, Robert S. Rayburn, R. C. Sproul, Jr., Douglas Wilson, Rousas John Rushdoony, James B. Jordan, Gary North, and Steve Wilkins.

The Federation of Reformed Churches practices paedocommunion in all its churches as do some congregations within the Communion of Reformed Evangelical Churches. The Christian Reformed Church and the Reformed Episcopal Church, a conservative Anglican denomination, also are tolerant of the practice, and many conservative Presbyterians favor paedocommunion as well. In the Presbyterian Church in America, doctrinal acceptance of paedocommunion is tolerated though the practice itself is not allowed.

== See also ==
- Communion and the developmentally disabled
- Infant baptism
