= Norman Shepherd =

American theologian (born 1933)

- Born: 1933
- Education: Westminster College (B.A.); Westminster Theological Seminary (B.D., Th.M.)
- Occupation: Theologian · Professor · Pastor
- Years active: 1963–1998
- Organizations: Westminster Theological Seminary; Christian Reformed Church in North America
- Known for: Associate Professor of Systematic Theology at Westminster (1963–1981); central figure in justification controversy; pastor in the Christian Reformed Church (1983–1998)
- Notable work: The Call of Grace: How the Covenant Illuminates Salvation and Evangelism (2001); Obedient Faith (Festschrift, 2012)

Norman Shepherd (born 1933) is an American theologian who served as associate professor of systematic theology at Westminster Theological Seminary from 1963 to 1981. He later served for almost two decades as a minister in the Christian Reformed Church in North America.

== Early life and education ==
Norman Shepherd received his undergraduate degree from Westminster College, and went on to earn his B.D. and Th.M. from Westminster Theological Seminary. He began doctoral studies at the Free University of Amsterdam but failed to complete his PhD due to his teaching course load at Westminster.

== Career ==
Shepherd began teaching at Westminster Theological Seminary in 1963, and continued there until 1981. He pastored churches in the Christian Reformed Church in North America from 1983 until his retirement in 1998.

== Controversial views ==
Shepherd had a number of views that were criticized as being contrary to the Westminster Standards, and this led him to be dismissed from his post at Westminster. First and foremost, Shepherd was found to have taught students in the classroom that justification was by the twofold instrument of faith and good works. This allegation directly contradicted one of the two foundational principles of the Protestant Reformation—and a doctrine that is considered by Protestants to be the heart of the Gospel—that justification is by faith alone or Sola Fide. Critics said that it also violated Shepherd's pledge not to teach anything that contradicted the doctrinal standards of the seminary. In the seven-year dispute within the seminary community, which ultimately culminated in Shepherd's dismissal, Shepherd backed away from explicitly saying that faith and works were co-instrumental in justification, but, despite changes in terminology, maintained the substance of his teaching on justification.

Shepherd argued that evangelism should be carried out with covenant in mind rather than election, which will lead the evangelist to say to people, "Christ died to save you." This was criticized as being a denial of limited atonement. Shepherd spoke of Christians being justified by "obedient faith," a phrase that was criticized as denying justification by faith alone. Shepherd also taught that a person may "pass from an elect and justified status to a non-elect and non-justified status." In other words, according to his critics, he taught that a person could lose his or her salvation. This contradicted the Reformed teaching of the eternal security of the believer and the doctrine of the perseverance of the saints, articulated in the Synod of Dort.

On May 4, 1976, the faculty of Westminster Theological Seminary requested that Shepherd produce a written statement detailing his view of the doctrine of justification sola fide, due to concerns that his teaching on the subject might be out of accord with the Westminster Standards. The controversy over Shepherd's views gradually spread from the seminary to the broader Reformed theological community. Shepherd was repeatedly exonerated by the faculty and board of trustees during their investigation of his views. On November 21, 1981, the board of trustees dismissed Shepherd from his teaching post, expressing a desire to distance the seminary from the intensity and longevity of the controversy.

Jelle Faber, Principal of the Canadian Reformed Theological Seminary, compared Shepherd's dismissal to that of Klaas Schilder, and noted that Shepherd was in agreement with Francis Turretin. Faber also wrote at the time that Westminster had "lost an eminent Reformed dogmatician."

However, Martyn Lloyd-Jones, referring to Shepherd's teaching on justification, commented, "to teach this to students is tragically wrong." William Hendriksen said, "As I see it, we must choose between Shepherd's view and that of Paul...What Shepherd offers looks like a kind of compromise between Catholicism and Protestantism, a compromise that will never satisfy either party...as I personally see it, his view should not be allowed to be taught at Westminster Seminary."

Shepherd's views were also controversial in the Orthodox Presbyterian Church, the denomination in which he was a minister. Shepherd left the OPC in 1983 and became a minister in the Christian Reformed Church in North America, serving congregations in Minnesota and Illinois until his retirement in 1998.

== Legacy ==
In 2000, Shepherd published a book, The Call of Grace: How the Covenant Illuminates Salvation and Evangelism, which contained the substance of the teachings that led to his dismissal from Westminster Theological Seminary.

In 2012, a Festschrift was published in his honor. Obedient Faith: A Festschrift for Norman Shepherd included contributions from James B. Jordan, Peter Leithart, Andrew Sandlin, and Rich Lusk.
