= Benjamin R. Merkle =

American theologian

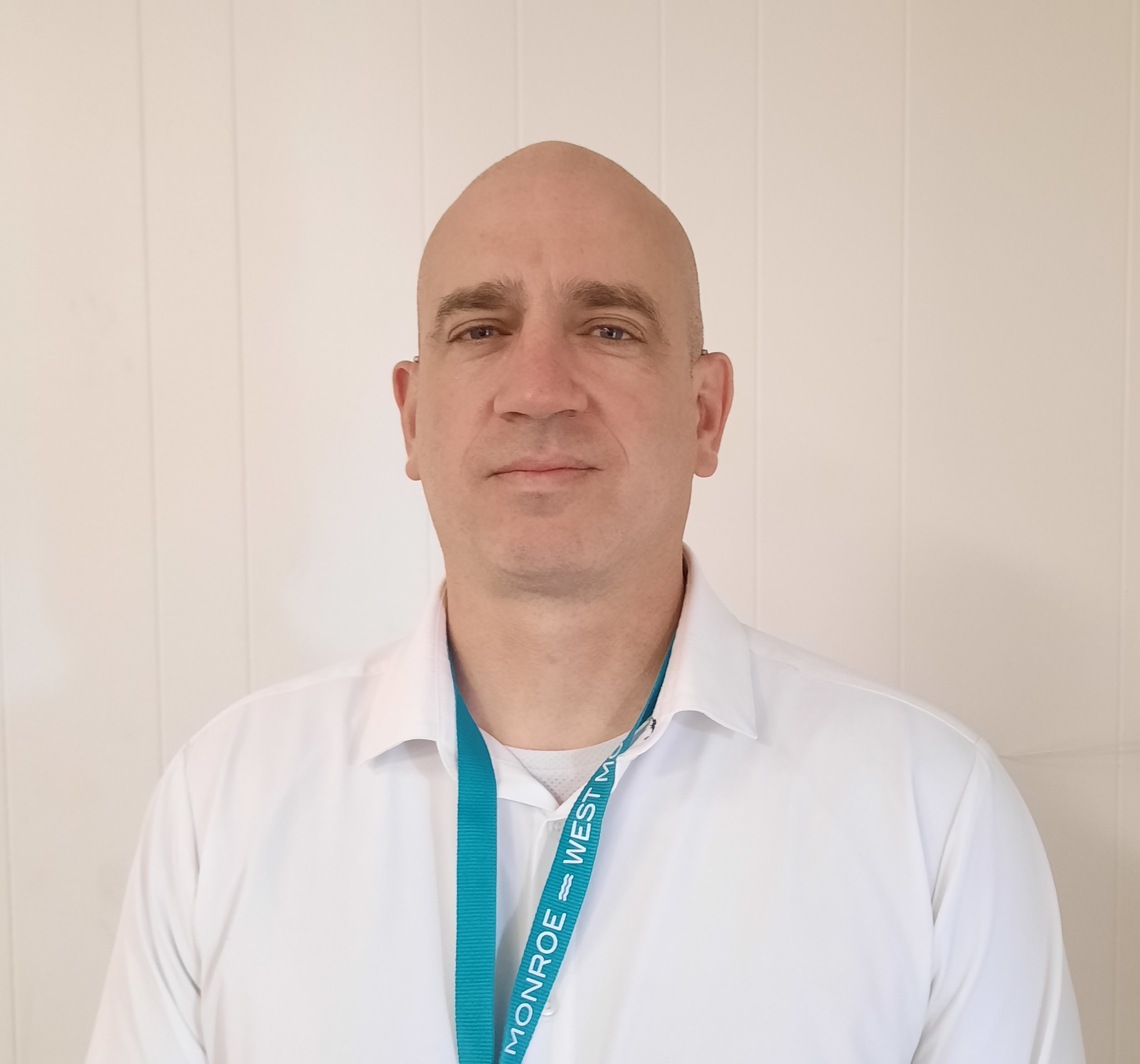
Merkle in 2021

Benjamin R. Merkle (born 1972) is president of New Saint Andrews College, a Christian college in Idaho, United States.

Merkle studied at the University of Idaho and the University of Oxford, obtaining a D. Phil. in 2012. He was appointed president of New Saint Andrews in 2015.

In 2009, Merkle wrote The White Horse King: The Life of Alfred the Great. In 2015 his D. Phil. dissertation was published by Oxford University Press under the title Defending the Trinity in the Reformed Palatinate: The Elohistae. He previously served as executive minister of Christ Church, and has also served as managing editor of Credenda/Agenda.
