= Credenda/Agenda =

- Editor: Douglas Wilson
- Categories: Christianity
- Frequency: Quarterly
- Publisher: Christ Church
- Founded: 1989
- Final issue: 2012
- Country: United States
- Based in: Moscow, Idaho
- Language: English
- Website: www.credenda.org
- OCLC: 38197050

Credenda/Agenda was a Christian cultural and theological journal, published under the auspices of Christ Church of Moscow, Idaho. Douglas Wilson served as editor, Douglas M. Jones as senior editor, and N. D. Wilson as managing editor. Editions were published quarterly in print form and also electronically on the internet. Canon Press, another ministry of Christ Church, also produced an audio edition.

Credenda/Agenda began appearing in 1989 as a loose-paper pamphlet, though the format was revised in 1997 to a full-page magazine. The title is Latin for "Things to be believed/things to be done".

Publication appears to have ended in 2012, although back issues are still for sale at the CanonPress website.

== Subject matter ==
The magazine's subject matter was typically of a religious nature, though film and book reviews, satire of prominent news stories, poems, and short stories are common. Each issue had a general theme to which many of the articles relate. Past themes included escapism, paedocommunion, the Textus Receptus, sex, C. S. Lewis, P. G. Wodehouse, cheese and Beowulf, and special issues addressed the September 11, 2001 attacks and the editors' views on the New Perspective on Paul.

The magazine advocated a Reformed soteriology, a liturgical approach to worship, a Van Tillian approach to apologetics, the federal headship of men within the family, and the cultivation of the mind through the liberal arts and the Western tradition.

A number of the articles from the magazine have been collected and expanded into books, including some of Douglas and Nancy Wilson's books on family life—Reforming Marriage (1995), Fruit of Her Hands (1997), Standing on the Promises (1997), Federal Husband (1999), and others—and Douglas Wilson and Douglas Jones's volume on cultural vision, Angels in the Architecture (1998).

Crawford Gribben notes that "Credenda Agenda featured wry and often satirical articles that popularized elements of Rushdoony's political and eschatological vision while emphasizing the value of Reformed theology, life in community, and the importance of the liberal arts."

== See also ==
- List of theological journals
