= Logos School =

Coordinates: 46°44′02″N 117°01′12″W

Location
- 110 Baker Street, Moscow, Idaho, 83843; United States

Information
- Type: Private, Classical Christian
- Established: 1981
- Superintendent: Matt Whitling
- Secondary Principal: Walter Wiggins
- Grades: K–12
- Campus: suburban
- Accreditation: Association of Classical and Christian Schools
- Website: http://www.logosschool.com

Logos School is a private, classical Christian school in Moscow, Idaho. Logos School is one of the first Classical Christian schools in the modern movement. Its teaching approach is discussed in the book Recovering the Lost Tools of Learning. Logos School is organized as a limited liability company.

Logos has numerous connections to Christ Church in Moscow. It was founded in 1981 by Douglas Wilson, pastor of what is now Christ Church. It is accredited by the Association of Classical and Christian Schools (ACCS), which Wilson also founded. It is the model for the Classical Christian education curriculum, and it conducts annual training sessions for teachers. Canon Press, also founded by Doug Wilson, has a Logos School division which produces learning materials for schools and home schoolers.

The board of Logos School decided in 2003 to allow only men to serve on the board.

In 2026, the board approved a proposal to build a 2500-seat track and field stadium named after conservative activist Charlie Kirk.

== Notable alumni ==
- Joel Courtney, actor
- N. D. Wilson, writer
