= Kathryn Reiss =

American novelist

- Born: December 4, 1957 (age 68) Massachusetts, U.S.
- Occupation: Author
- Education: Duke University (BA); University of Michigan (MFA)
- Genre: Fiction

Website
- www.kathrynreiss.net

Kathryn Reiss (born December 4, 1957) is an American author of award-winning children's and young adult fiction.

== Early life and education ==
Kathryn Reiss was born in Massachusetts, December 4, 1957. She grew up in Ohio, and received B.A. degrees in English and German from Duke University, and an M.F.A. in creative writing from the University of Michigan, Ann Arbor.

== Career ==
After college, she lived in Bonn, Germany, as a Fulbright Scholar, and during this time, wrote the first draft of her first novel.

She is the author of many novels of suspense for middle grade and young adult readers, often including elements of time travel and the supernatural. She has written several mystery books in the American Girl series as well as Blackthorn Winter (2006) and Murder at Heatherstone Hall (2015), murder mystery novels set in England.

Time Windows was selected by the American Library Association as a Best Books for Young Adults, received YALSA's "Popular Paperback for Young Adults" award and the State of Maryland's "Blackeyed Susan Young Reader Medal." Dreadful Sorry, also a YALSA Popular Paperback for Young Adults, was a featured selection of the Junior Library Guild and was named "Pick of the Crop" in The School Library Journal starred review. Pale Phoenix and Paperquake were nominated for the Mystery Writers of America's prestigious Edgar Allan Poe Award for juvenile mystery fiction, and Paperquake additionally was named one of YALSA's Popular Paperbacks for Young Adults. Paint by Magic, a time travel mystery, won a place on VOYA's Top Shelf Fiction for Middle School Readers and is an International School Librarians Association Honor Book.

Reiss has been a Writer in Residence for the Princeton Arts Council, a recipient of the New Jersey State Council on the Arts Grant for Writers, and has been a featured speaker with (among others) Sisters in Crime, Mystery Writers of America, The Society of Children's Book Writers and Illustrators, The Northern California Library Association, The International Reading Association, Fresno County Office of Education, California Reading Association, The American Library Association, and the National Council of Teachers of English.

== Personal life ==
She lives in Northern California with her husband and children, and teaches Creative Writing at Mills College.

== Bibliography ==
- Time Windows (1991)
- The Glass House People (1992)
- Dreadful Sorry (1993)
- Pale Phoenix (1994)
- Paperquake: A Puzzle (1998)
- Paint by Magic: A Time Travel Mystery (2002)
- Sweet Miss Honeywell's Revenge: A Ghost Story (2004)
- Blackthorn Winter (2006)
- Murder at Heatherstone Hall (2015)

=== American Girl Mysteries ===
- Riddle of the Prairie Bride (2001)
- The Strange Case of Baby H (2002)
- The Tangled Web: A Julie Mystery (2009)
- Puzzle of the Paper Daughter: A Julie Mystery (2010)
- The Silver Guitar: A Julie Mystery (2011)
- A Bundle of Trouble: A Rebecca Mystery (2011)
- Intruders at Rivermead Manor: A Kit Mystery (2014)
- Message in a Bottle: A Julie Mystery (2017)

=== Ghost in the Dollhouse ===
- Dollhouse of the Dead (1997)
- The Headless Bride (1997)
- Rest in Peace (1997)
