= James B. Jordan =

American theologian and author

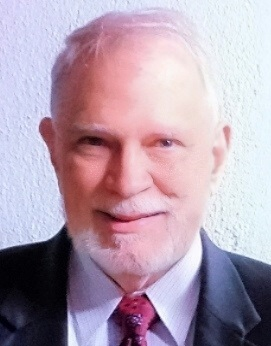
James Jordan

James Burrell Jordan (born December 31, 1949) is an American Protestant theologian and author. He is the director of Biblical Horizons ministries, an organization in Niceville, Florida that publishes books, essays and other media dealing with Bible commentary, biblical theology, and liturgy. It adheres to biblical absolutism including Young Earth Creationism and is committed to the concept of biblical theocracy.

== Early life and education ==
Jordan was born in Athens, Georgia. After public school, Jordan attended the University of Georgia, where he received a Bachelor of Arts in comparative literature. While in college, he participated in the Campus Crusade for Christ and Young Americans for Freedom.

He served four years as a lieutenant in the United States Air Force, first as an Administration Management Officer and then as a military historian. He attended Reformed Theological Seminary in Jackson, Mississippi, before ultimately earning a Master's degree and Th.M. from Westminster Theological Seminary in Philadelphia, Pennsylvania. His master's thesis was on slavery in the Bible. In 1993, Jordan received a D. Litt. from the Central School of Religion for his dissertation on the dietary laws of Moses.

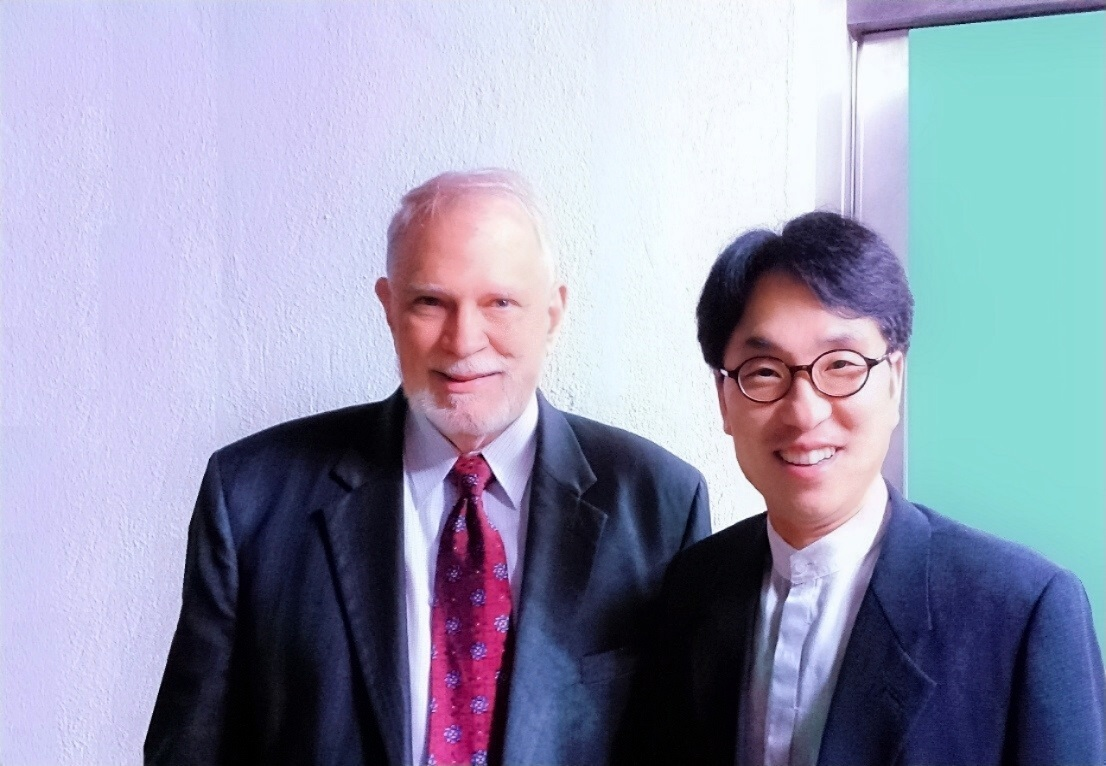
Dr. James B. Jordan(KOSEBI) invited lecture with Prof. Seung-Moo Ha(2013)

== Career ==
After his 1982 ordination in the Association of Reformed Churches, Jordan served for five years alongside Ray Sutton as associate pastor of Westminster Presbyterian Church, in Tyler, Texas. He was also the director of Geneva Ministries and Geneva Divinity School.

After the work in Tyler unraveled into discord and internal dissension, Jordan developed his own platform for writing, Biblical Horizons, a Niceville, Florida-based research and publishing ministry. Biblical Horizons emphasizes the Trinity and biblical absolutism with a covenant-historical approach to interpretation and a focus on biblical theocracy, eschatology and worship.

Since 2000, Jordan has served as head of the Department of Biblical Studies at the Biblical Theological Seminary, St. Petersburg, Russia, where he teaches Old Testament and Eschatology.

In 2011, Wipf and Stock published a Festschrift in Jordan's honor. Glory of Kings: A Festschrift in Honor of James B. Jordan (ISBN 9781608996803) was edited by Peter J. Leithart, and included contributions from Rich Lusk, Douglas Wilson and John Frame.

In 2015, Jordan moved to Birmingham, AL to join Peter Leithart in the work of Theopolis Institute. Following a stroke in 2017, he announced in 2019 the closing down of Biblical Horizons and his endorsement of Theopolis Institute as continuing his work.

== Thought ==
Bill DeJong characterizes Jordan's approach to biblical hermeneutics as "pastoral typology" - that is, seeing biblical typology as pointing not just to the work of Christ, but also to Christian worship.

== Publications ==
Jordan has written many articles and books, including:

- James B. Jordan and Gary North, eds. (1982). Symposium on the Failure of the American Baptist Culture. Geneva Divinity School. ISBN 0-939404-04-4. Archived from the original on June 9, 2007.
- James B. Jordan (1984). The Law of the Covenant: An Exposition of Exodus 21–23. Institute for Christian Economics. ISBN 978-0-930464-02-8. Archived from the original on June 8, 2007.
- James B. Jordan (1999) [1985]. Judges: A Practical and Theological Commentary. a reissuing of Judges: God’s War Against Humanism. Wipf & Stock Publishers. ISBN 978-1-57910-249-4. Archived from the original on December 13, 2006.
- James B. Jordan, ed. (1985). The Reconstruction of the Church. Geneva Ministries. ISBN 0939404117. Archived from the original on April 12, 2007.
- James B. Jordan (1999) [1986]. The Sociology of the Church: Essays in Reconstruction. Wipf & Stock. ISBN 978-1-57910-248-7. Archived from the original on June 9, 2007.
- Gary North and James B. Jordan (1987). Healer of the Nations: Biblical Blueprints for International Relations. Dominion Press. ISBN 978-0-930462-21-5. Archived from the original on November 23, 2007.
- James B. Jordan (2000) [1988]. Through New Eyes. Wipf & Stock. p. 360. ISBN 978-1-57910-259-3. Archived from the original on April 15, 2007.
- James B. Jordan (1989). Covenant Sequence in Leviticus and Deuteronomy: Literary Order or Chaos?. Institute for Christian Economics. ISBN 0-930464-22-2. Archived from the original on August 7, 2007.
- John Calvin (James B. Jordan, ed.) (1990) [1583]. Covenant Enforced: Sermons on Deuteronomy 27 and 28. Institute for Christian Economics. ISBN 0-930464-33-8. Archived from the original on April 16, 2007.
- James B. Jordan (1994). The liturgy trap: The Bible versus mere tradition in worship. Transfiguration Press. p. 98. ISBN 978-1-883690-04-5.
- James B. Jordan (1998) [1994]. Theses on Worship: Notes Toward the Reformation of Worship. Transfiguration Press. p. 113. ISBN 1-883690-09-9.
- James B. Jordan (1999). Creation in Six Days: A Defense of the Traditional Reading of Genesis One. Canon Press. p. 272. ISBN 978-1-885767-62-2. A defense of Young Earth creationism against the framework interpretation of Genesis 1.
- James B. Jordan (2000) [1994]. Liturgical Nestorianism and the Regulative Principle. Transfiguration Press. p. 96. ISBN 1-883690-13-7.
- James B. Jordan (2001). Primeval Saints: Studies in the Patriarchs of Genesis. Canon Press. p. 160. ISBN 978-1-885767-86-8.
- James B. Jordan (2007). The Handwriting on the Wall: A Commentary on the Book of Daniel. American Vision. p. 733. ISBN 978-0-915815-63-0.
- James B. Jordan (2008). The Vindication of Jesus Christ. Athanasius Press. p. 96. ISBN 978-0-9753914-8-8.
- James B. Jordan (2009). Crisis, Opportunity, and the Christian Future. Athanasius Press. p. 62. ISBN 978-0-9842439-1-4.
