= Christ Church (Moscow, Idaho) =

Coordinates: 46°43′51″N 116°59′59″W

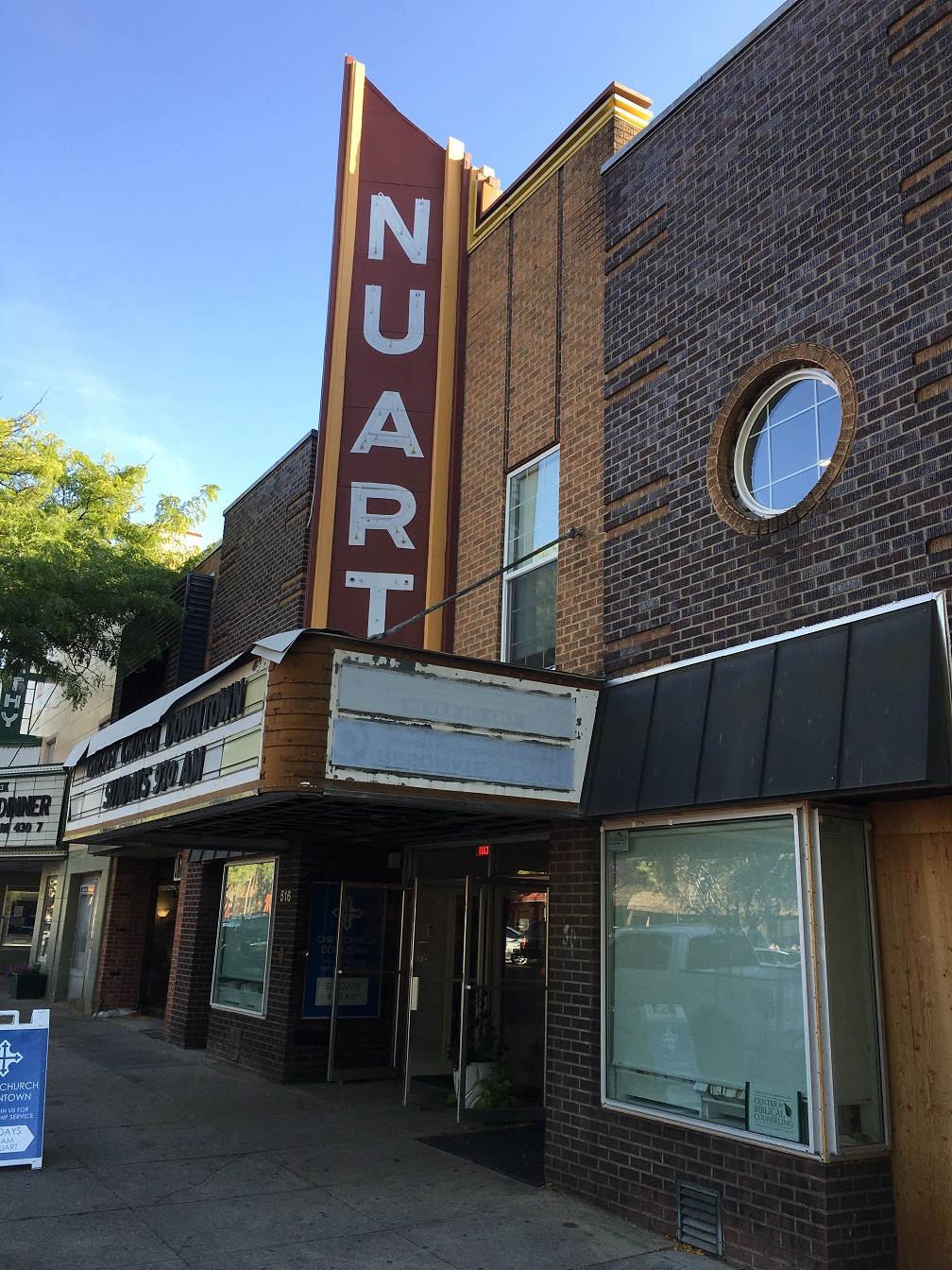
- Nu Art Theatre on Main St, Moscow, where Christ Church meets.
- Christ Church
- Location: Moscow, Idaho
- Country: United States
- Denomination: Communion of Reformed Evangelical Churches
- Website: christkirk.com

History
- Former name: Community Evangelical Fellowship
- Founded: Late 1970s

Clergy
- Pastor: Douglas Wilson

Christ Church is a Calvinist church in Moscow, Idaho, pastored by Douglas Wilson, and a member of the Communion of Reformed Evangelical Churches. The congregation has received international coverage for its views, which include advocating for a theocracy, and its desire to make Moscow a "Christian town". It has formal and informal affiliations with a number of ministries, including a three-year ministerial training program (Greyfriars Hall), a private accredited college (New Saint Andrews), a campus ministry (Collegiate Reformed Fellowship), and formerly a publishing operation and magazine (Canon Press, Credenda/Agenda). The church is estimated to have between 900 and 2,000 members.

== Beliefs ==
Christ Church is a Reformed church, holding conservative views. Its ministers are proponents of postmillennialism and have been described as holding to a form of dominion theology known as Christian reconstructionism. It is known for its promotion of Christian education and biblical courtship, and for its opposition to liberalism and feminism as being contrary to the Christian faith. Christ Church also holds to biblical inerrancy and adheres to the Westminster Standards, the Three Forms of Unity, and the Apostles' and Nicene Creeds. It is a charter member of the Communion of Reformed Evangelical Churches.

Heath Druzin, host of NPR's podcast Extremely American, describes the church as "a major player, if not the major player" in the Christian nationalist movement nationwide.

The church has drawn attention for its vocal opposition, and active resistance to federal and local restrictions meant to halt the spread of COVID-19. The church's head pastor, Douglas Wilson, has posted on his blog and on YouTube to call on his followers to "resist openly, in concert with any others in your same position", which he said would constitute "an example of a free people refusing to go along with their own enslavement". Wilson's remarks, which also warned "we are not yet in a hot civil war, with shooting and all, but we are in a cold war/civil war", drew condemnation from prominent evangelicals.

== Affiliated organizations ==
=== New Saint Andrews College ===
New Saint Andrews College is a classical Christian liberal arts college that is listed as a ministry of Christ Church. Ben Merkle, an elder at Christ Church, is president. The church's session of Elders is the spiritual authority for the college. Studies at NSA include "the languages, history, philosophy, and culture of classical antiquity and Western tradition in the light of Scripture".

=== Greyfriars Hall ===
Greyfriars Hall is a ministerial training program affiliated with Christ Church. Men who complete the three-year program, which is tuition-free, receive a letter rather than a diploma. Elders of Christ Church are the program's overseers. The faculty comprises Christ Church ministers Doug Wilson, Toby Sumpter, and Ben Zornes.

=== Bakwé Mission ===
The Bakwé Mission is the church's foreign mission ministry to the Bakwé people of southwest Côte d'Ivoire. It consists mainly of translating scripture for the Bakwé Church, as well as training teachers to teach reading and writing to the Bakwé people.

=== Logos School ===
The Logos School is nondenominational classical Christian school with numerous connections to Christ Church, which regularly promotes Classical Christian education.

=== Canon Press ===
Canon Press was founded by Doug Wilson as a ministry of Christ Church. It was later sold to Wilson's son and other Christ Church members.

== History ==
=== Origins ===
Christ Church was initially an Evangelical Free Church plant, which started in 1975.

=== 2020 anti-mask protests ===
In late September 2020, Christ Church organized and promoted two anti-mask protests at Moscow's City Hall. The protests consisted of members of the church and local community gathering mask-less at City Hall and singing psalms and hymns to protest Moscow's mandatory mask policy which required people to wear a mask in public places or at large gatherings. These protests occurred on Wednesday, September 23 and Friday, September 25. At the Wednesday psalm sing/protest about 150 people showed up and five people were cited and three were arrested with the most notable arrestee being 2020 Latah County Commissioner Candidate and Christ Church deacon Gabriel Rench. At the second psalm sing/protest on Friday, September 25, the protesters were joined by counter-protesters who beat drums to try to drown out the singing. About 400 protesters showed up and no one was arrested. Charges against Gabriel Rench were later dismissed.

In February 2023, U.S. District Court Judge Morrison C. England Jr. ruled that "the City indisputably erred in interpreting its own Code", and that the church members ought never to have been arrested in the first place, since the city ordinances explicitly exempted both religious and protest activities.

=== Local influence ===
Dating back to 2019, the church's leader, Douglas Wilson, has stated that the church aims to "make Moscow a Christian town", and favors "theocracy" as opposed to "civil governments, [which] are in necessary degrees satanic, demonic, and influenced by the god of this world, who is the devil". In a November 2021 investigation, The Guardian argued that "Church figures have browbeaten elected officials over Covid restrictions, built powerful institutions in parallel to secular government, harassed perceived opponents, and accumulated land and businesses in pursuit of a long-term goal of transforming America into a nation ruled according to its own, ultra-conservative moral precepts". Said parallel institutions include "educational institutions, publishing houses, churches, and national associations". Many of these institutions, including New Saint Andrews College, are run by members of Wilson's family. One of the founders of the college served as the former chief executive of the town's largest private employer, EMSI, which has hired about 10% of all of the college's total graduates since the school's inception. A local businessman, who spoke anonymously to The Guardian, said that the church had a large footprint in Moscow's downtown, and alleged that church members was attempting to attract new members to the town through a large development project planned by a church elder.

Queen's University Belfast professor of history Crawford Gribben notes that Christ Church has made "very little impact on local politics", and that Moscow is not yet a Christian town.

=== Washington, D.C., church plant ===
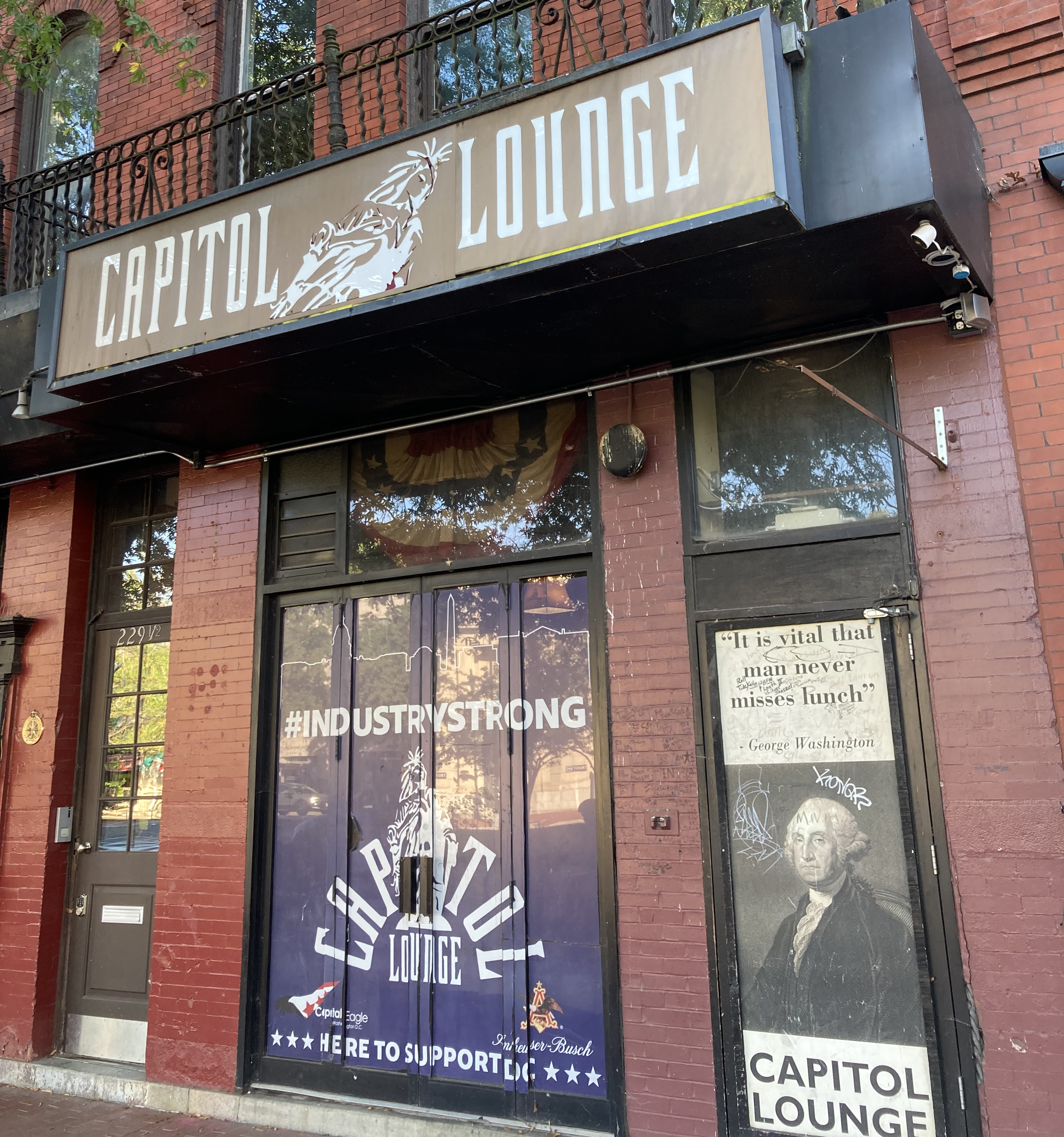
229½ Pennsylvania Avenue SE is the location of a Washington church plant of Christ Church.

In 2025, Christ Church planted a location in Washington, D.C. The D.C. church was initially served by a rotating set of pastors from Christ Church and the CREC until it "particularizes" as a standalone congregation with its own local leaders. The congregation met in space on Pennsylvania Avenue on Capitol Hill owned by the Conservative Partnership Institute.

Defense Secretary Pete Hegseth, who is affiliated with a CREC congregation, attended its first service, which attracted 200 worshipers. The church plant has been the object of repeated protests by William Kelly, who participated in disruption of a service at Cities Church in Minneapolis in January 2026.
