= Blackthorn Winter (Wilson novel) =

2003 novel by Douglas Wilson

- Author: Douglas Wilson
- Illustrator: Peter Bentley
- Language: English
- Series: Veritas Maritime
- Genre: historical, adventure, young adult
- Publisher: Veritas Press (United States)
- Publication date: 2003
- Publication place: United States
- Media type: Print (softcover)
- Pages: 141 pp.
- ISBN: 1-932168-10-9

Blackthorn Winter is a 2003 novel by Douglas Wilson, his first work of fiction for children. Set during the reign of the Good Queen Anne, Blackthorn Winter tells the story of the young Thomas Ingle's adventures at sea.

== Plot introduction ==
After many attempts to convince his widowed mother to allow him to go to sea, the young Thomas Ingle finally prevails and joins the crew of the "Prudent Hannah." Just before Thomas's departure he observes three rough-looking men bury an oilskin satchel under a mulberry tree along the coast. After the men row out to sea, Thomas investigates and, digging up the mysterious bundle, discovers a map which he cannot understand. Believing the map to mark the location of buried treasure, Thomas memorizes the map, reburying it and keeping his find a secret. The next morning Thomas boards his ship and shortly after leaving port, the ship is waylaid by several Pirate ships led by O'Conner—one of the men Thomas had previously seen burying the map Ingle has yet to decipher. Thomas and his own Captain Monroe are captured, suffer many hardships at the hands of the Pirates, and eventually escape to safety.

== Sequel ==
Wilson followed Blackthorn Winter with Susan Creek in 2004. The second book's adventures are those of Captain Morgan's grandson John Monroe who inadvertently discovers a British officer spying for the French. This story is set in the 1740s and includes several encounters with George Whitefield, the famed Great Awakening preacher .

== Use in schools ==
Like Robert Louis Stevenson's classic pirate story, Treasure Island, Blackthorn Winter is often assigned reading for school children, particularly in Classical Christian Schools. The book is also included in curricula used by home educators. While Treasure Island is typically read in junior high schools, Blackthorn Winter is more commonly assigned to younger readers.
