= New Saint Andrews College =

Christian college in Idaho

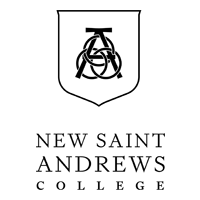
- Type: Private college
- Established: August 29, 1994
- Accreditation: TRACS; NWCCU
- Affiliations: Association of Classical and Christian Schools (ACCS), and Association of Reformed Institutions of Higher Education (ARIHE)
- Religious affiliation: Christian
- President: Benjamin R. Merkle
- Faculty: 27
- Students: 221 (2020)
- Undergraduates: 272 FTE, 2023
- Location: Moscow, Idaho, United States; 46.7316°N 117.0017°W
- Campus: College town
- Website: https://nsa.edu/

New Saint Andrews College is a private classical Christian college in Moscow, Idaho. It was founded in 1994 by Christ Church. The college offers no undergraduate majors, but follows a single, integrated classical liberal arts curriculum from a Christian worldview in its associate's and bachelor's degree programs. The college also offers master's degrees in theology and letters and classical Christian studies. The New Saint Andrews board, faculty, and staff are confessionally Reformed (Calvinist). Board members are affiliated with the Communion of Reformed Evangelical Churches (CREC). The Elders of nearby Christ Church serve as the college's spiritual authority.

== History ==
New Saint Andrews College first opened its doors on August 29, 1994, beginning with four students that fall, and graduated its first two students in 1998. It moved to its present location in downtown Moscow when it purchased the historic Skattaboe Block (built in 1892). The college was featured on the Christian Broadcasting Network in March 2006. In August 2006, New Saint Andrews was named by the Intercollegiate Studies Institute as one of the top 50 schools for "conservatives, old-fashioned liberals, and people of faith." The college was also featured in The New York Times Magazine in September 2007.

Roy Atwood served as president until 2014, and was succeeded by Ben Merkle. The college purchased a second building in downtown Moscow, a former nightclub, with the intention to develop it into a music conservatory. A permit for the expansion was approved by the city in 2017.

A 2020 recruitment advertisement published online by the college led the town's mayor to state that the video "conveys a message of intolerance to anyone who does not fit traditional male-female gender identities" and was not reflective of the city's positions on gender identity; according to The Guardian, the advertisement was "seen as transphobic by many in Moscow".

== Academics and student life ==
The college's classical Christian program of studies follows the Trivium and Quadrivium in its single, integrated undergraduate curriculum in liberal arts and culture. The curriculum stresses learning from great books and developing the skills to be a lifelong learner. Rather than using textbooks, the college requires reading of primary works in the classical and Christian literature of Western civilization. The college uses "Oxford-style" small group recitations, in which six to eight students meet with individual faculty members to discuss the assigned readings. Students have examinations every eight weeks, many of which are conducted orally. Seniors are required to write theses and defend them before a faculty panel. The college offers associate and bachelor's degrees in liberal arts and culture, a Master of Arts in Trinitarian theology and culture, and a Master of Studies (and Graduate Certificate) in Classical Christian Studies.

The college has three halls named after battles "at which Christian soldiers fought against all odds": Jericho, Ashdown, and Malta.

The college limits new student enrollment to 105 new undergraduate students and 10–15 graduate students each year. The student body numbers about 300 students (full-time equivalent) from about 30 states, five foreign countries, and more than 20 Christian denominations. Approximately half of the college's students were home-schooled and nearly a third attended Association of Classical and Christian Schools (ACCS) affiliated high schools.

The college provides no dormitories or food services, by board policy. Instead, it encourages students to live as responsible members of the local community, and assists students and their families in arranging appropriate housing.

As of the May 2010 Commencement, the college had more than 200 alumni. Approximately one-third of the college's graduates pursue graduate school or advanced professional studies, one-third go on to teach at classical and Christian schools, and one-third pursue other callings or professions.

== Sports ==
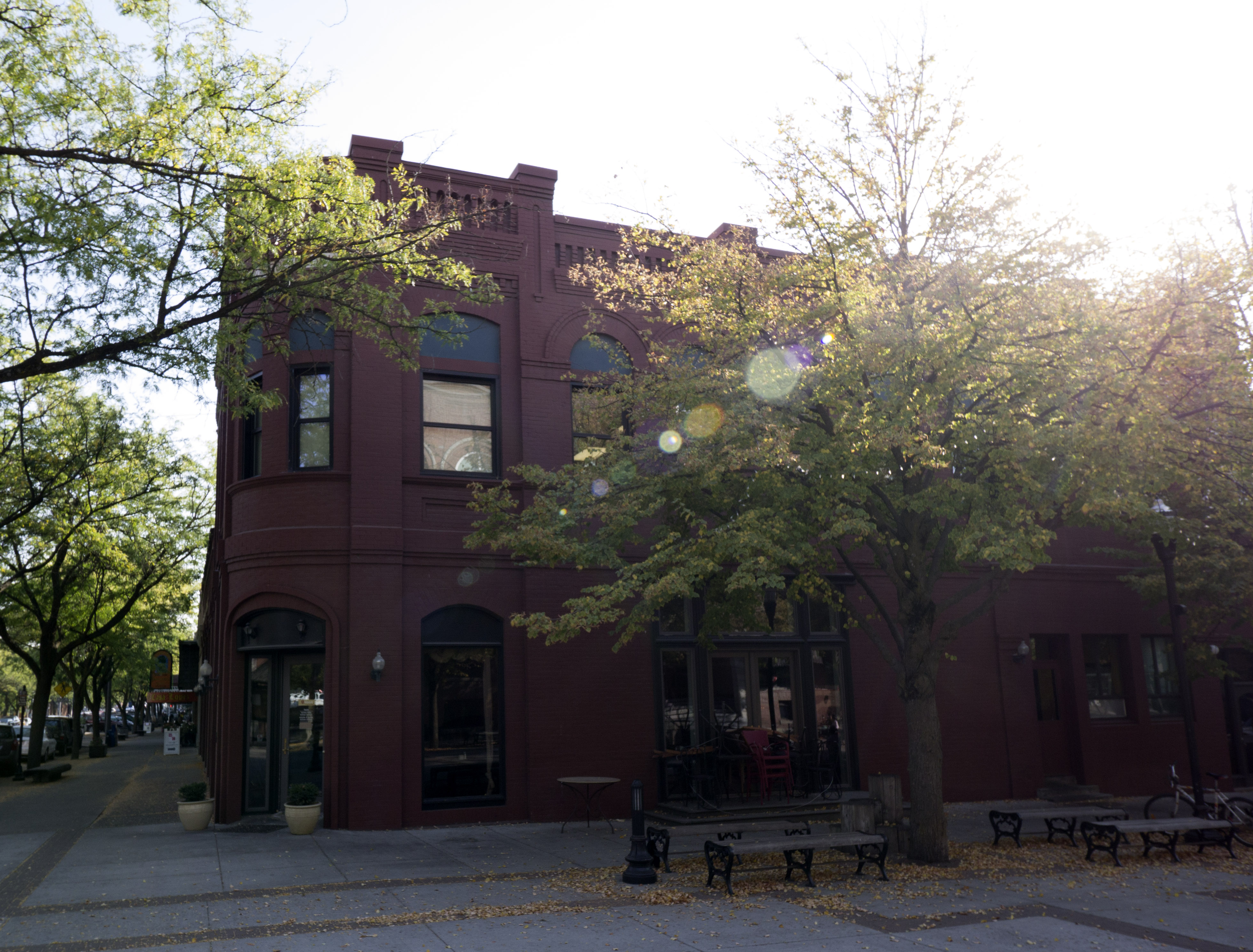
New Saint Andrews College's main building before it was purchased.

New Saint Andrews College does not participate in any collegiate sports associations, but does offer a variety of intramural sports, namely men's rugby, women's volleyball, and track and field.

== Accreditation ==
The college is a charter member of the Association of Classical and Christian Schools (ACCS) and a member of the Association of Reformed Institutions of Higher Education (ARIHE). NSA is a fully accredited member of both the Northwest Commission on Colleges and Universities (NWCCU) and the Transnational Association of Christian Colleges and Schools (TRACS). NWCCU awarded the college full accreditation in July 2023, and TRACS awarded it a second 10-year Reaffirmation of Accreditation in May 2020. The college's authorization to issue degrees is also recognized by the Idaho State Board of Education.

== Notable faculty ==
- Douglas Wilson
- N. D. Wilson
