= The Case for Christian Nationalism =

2022 book by Stephen Wolfe

- Author: Stephen Wolfe
- Publisher: Canon Press
- Publication date: 2022
- Pages: 488
- ISBN: 978-1957905334

The Case for Christian Nationalism is a 2022 book by Stephen Wolfe. The book argues for Christian nationalism based on cultural and ethnic affinity from a Christian perspective, and a retrieval of traditional Christian political thought.

== Summary ==
Wolfe approaches nationalism as becoming conscious of, and "being for", one's own "people-group". He argues that homogeneity within each people-group allows it to more properly pursue the good by ordering earthly life toward heavenly life, and that while a principal image of heavenly life can be found in Christian worship, only a Christian nation can provide a complete image. Wolfe argues for homogeneity by constructing a theological anthropology, positing that humans would have formed separate, culturally distinct communities, even if the fall of man had not occurred.

In addition, he argues that this should be accomplished through a "measured theocratic Caesarism", a Christian prince. Wolfe follows early Reformed thinkers, such as Francis Turretin, in assigning the government a role in suppressing outward displays of "false religion", but not a power to coerce the conscience or inward religion. The civil magistrate is tasked with wielding "formal civil power" for the public good. He also argues that Christian nationalism is compatible with the tradition of the American founding.

== Reception ==
In a review, Kevin DeYoung of The Gospel Coalition gave the book one star out of five, stating, "I understand and sympathize with the desire for something like Christian Nationalism, but if this book represents the best of that ism, then Christian Nationalism is not the answer the church or our nation needs."

Brad Littlejohn, writing for Themelios, describes the work as "three books in one". He considers "Book 1" a standard and representative presentation of classic magisterial Protestant political theory, consisting of many themes and ideas which were once "commonplaces" in Protestant thought. "Book 2" is a potentially partly helpful but also ambiguous account of nations and nationalism for Christian thought, and "Book 3" consists largely of "fierce denunciations of contemporary American political institutions and implicit (or explicit?) calls for revolutionary action to overthrow these institutions" in which, in Littlejohn's judgment, "Wolfe does not merely leave behind his earlier sober retrieval of historic Protestant political principles, but at certain points contradicts them."

Paul Matzko of Reason magazine called the book "segregationist", stating, "Wolfe's ethnicized vision of Christian nationalism is a reminder that, in a post-liberal vacuum, fearful American Christians have become easy targets for people whispering to take up the sword of the state and smite their foes." Several commentators criticized it for incorporating the arguments of and quoting white nationalist William Gayley Simpson, as well as Enoch Powell and Ernest Renan.

James Clark of The North American Anglican wrote that "Wolfe's account of revolution could be stronger" but he has nevertheless "written something important here, something that deserves to be read and contemplated".

Owen Strachan suggests that the New Testament is largely missing from "Wolfe's Thomistic project of political philosophy."

The book's epilogue has a looser tone and structure from the preceding chapters. Reviewers have called it a "rant" that attacks many cultural and political issues, including "gynocracy" (rule by women), sexual deviancy, and the "globalist American empire", and which calls for banishing or executing heretics.

Reviewers have said that the book calls for blood-and-soil nationalism.
