= Blackthorn Winter (Reiss novel) =

2006 young adult novel by Kathryn Reiss

- Author: Kathryn Reiss
- Language: English
- Genre: Young adult, mystery
- Publisher: Harcourt
- Publication date: 2006
- Publication place: United States
- Media type: Print (hardcover)
- Pages: 352 pp.
- ISBN: 0-15-205479-0
- OCLC: 57754049
- LC Class: PZ7.R2776 Bla 2006
- Followed by: Murder at Heatherstone Hall

Blackthorn Winter is a young adult mystery novel by Kathryn Reiss. The book was first published on January 1, 2006 through Harcourt Children's Books.

A sequel, Murder at Heatherstone Hall, was published in 2015.

== Plot introduction ==
Juliana, a fifteen-year-old girl, moves with her mother to the artists' colony of Blackthorn, England from the United States while her parents are undergoing a separation. She begins to investigate a murder of one of the artists living at the colony.

== Reception ==
Critical reception for Blackthorn Winter has been mixed to positive, and the book received reviews from the School Library Journal and Horn Book Guide. Kliatt gave Blackthorn Winter a positive review, stating that "YAs who like mysteries in atmospheric settings will enjoy this one." The Bulletin of the Center for Children's Books gave a more mixed review, as they felt that the book had too many elements at play that made what was an otherwise enjoyable read sluggish at points.
