= Rich Lusk =

American pastor and theologian

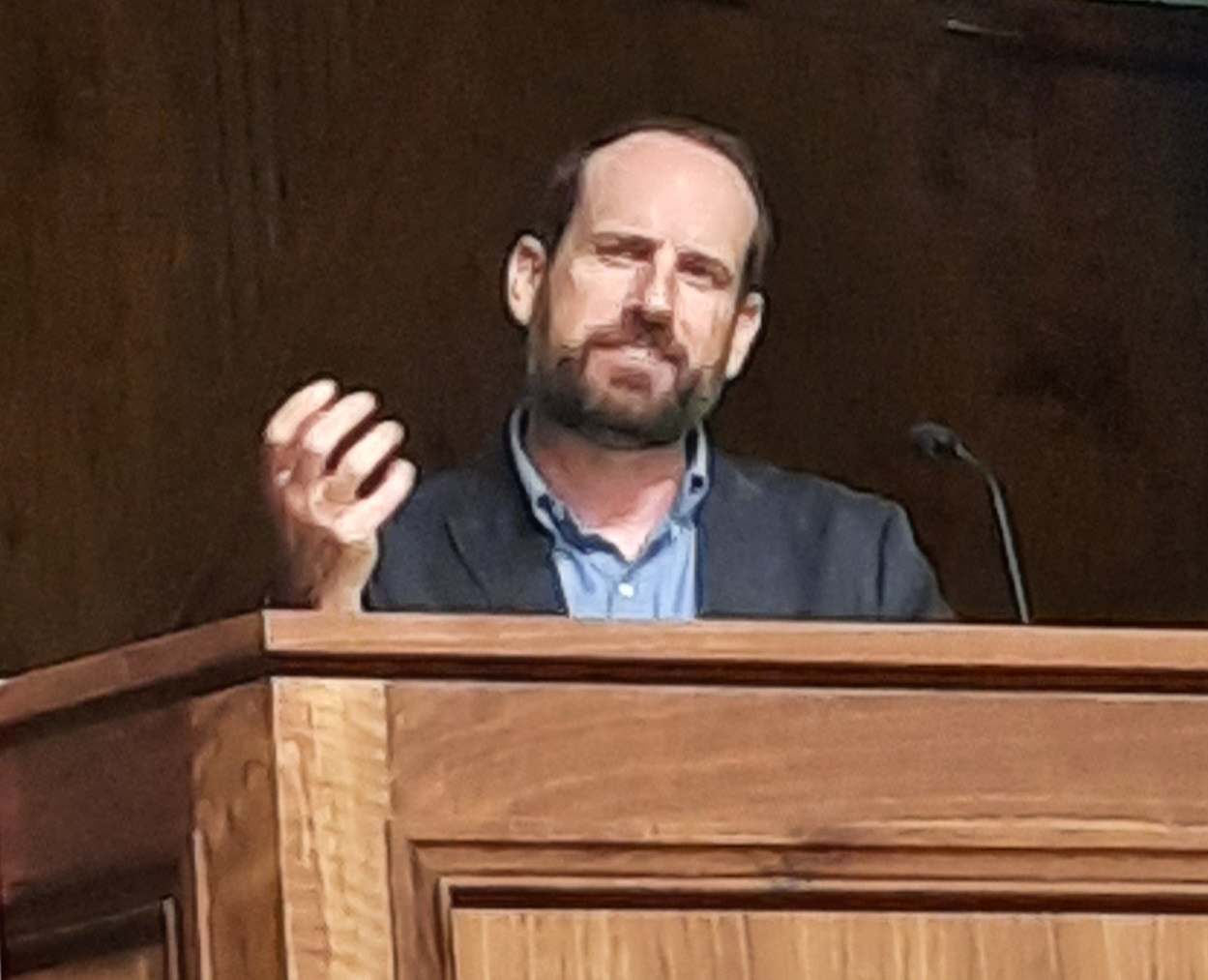
Rich Lusk in 2021

Rich Lusk (born 1973) is an American author, minister, and theologian. His book Paedofaith: A Primer on the Mystery of Infant Salvation and a Handbook for Covenant Parents is a book-length discussion of Christian infant faith. He is currently the pastor of Trinity Presbyterian Church in Birmingham, Alabama.

== Education ==
He received his B. S. in Microbiology from Auburn University and a M.A. in Philosophy from University of Texas at Austin.

== Career ==
In early 2005 Lusk came to pastor Reformed Heritage Presbyterian Church in Birmingham, Alabama, from Auburn Avenue Presbyterian Church in Monroe, Louisiana. Peter Leithart, a Cambridge-educated theologian was a former pastor of the church. Yet Lusk's transition affected the Church's denomination, name, and liturgy. The church moved out of the Presbyterian Church in America (PCA) and into the Confederation of Reformed Evangelical Churches (CREC) in October 2005 (see Douglas Wilson; Peter Leithart), since the Evangel Presbytery would not accept Lusk's transfer from the Louisiana Presbytery based on the "status and nature of covenant children [which] was the real focus of the discussion".

One elder from the church spoke to the examining body and: "pointed out that these doctrines were not new or strange for the congregation even if they were unique in the presbytery; indeed, they had been believed and taught for quite some time at Reformed Heritage (going back to Peter Leithart’s tenure as pastor in the late 1980s and early 1990s, if not before). It was also pointed out that this was a transfer exam, not an ordination exam, and all [Lusk's] positions had been acceptable in Louisiana presbytery. Catholicity and intra-denominational brotherhood demanded they receive [Lusk]."

The Evangel Presbytery declined the transfer. The elders from the church asked for a formal reason for the decision but this request was denied them. Lusk states: "I think the Evangel committee’s decision against recommending me was borne out of a lack of confidence to play the part of judge in the so-called “Auburn Avenue” or “Federal Vision” controversy." He went on to state, however: "I regarded, and continue to regard, all the men who served on Evangel’s committee as exemplary Christian men. They are faithful pastors and servants in Christ’s kingdom. Our disagreement over covenant children does not outweigh the many truths we hold in common."

After Lusk's arrival the church session voted to change its name to Trinity Presbyterian Church.

== Personal life ==
He is married and has four children.

== Works ==
=== Books ===
- Paedofaith: A Primer on the Mystery of Infant Salvation and a Handbook for Covenant Parents, 171 pages, Athanasius Press (November 16, 2005) ISBN 0-9753914-2-9, ISBN 978-0-9753914-2-6.
- I Belong to God: A Catechism for Covenant Children, 78 pages, Athanasius Press, ISBN 9780990535249

=== Contributions ===
- Ruth Through New Eyes: Under His Wings, Athanasius Press, ISBN 978-0615909387
