= Christian views on the classics =

Christian views on the classics have varied throughout history. In the early years of Christianity, the writings of Classical and Hellenistic authors were widely spread by Christian teachers. However, during the Dark Ages, the decline in the study of this literature as a whole, as well as the waning of Christianity's popularity throughout Europe, resulted in the extinction of its effect in Christian life until the spread of Islam—the reintroduction of Classical texts—and the "rebirth" of Ancient Greek and Roman philosophies and arts during the Renaissance, where "artists and philosophers, each in their own way, combined Christian belief and ancient philosophy into a balanced, rational, humanistic system". Today, churches' views are generally consistent with those of Renaissance humanists' in that "Christians should be able to read the classics ... because it is part of the Western heritage ... [and] because it is part of Christianity’s inheritance."

== Early Ages ==
When Christianity at first appeared in Antioch, the instruction of youth was largely confined to the basics of reading, writing and mathematics followed by the study of grammar, rhetoric, philosophy, and history. Much of the history was in verse; chief among which were the works of Horace and Virgil. Until the peace of the Church, early in the fourth century, the value and use of classical studies were unquestioned. Converts to Christianity brought with them such mental cultivation as they had received while pagans. They used their knowledge of mythology and ancient traditions as a means of attacking paganism. Tertullian forbade Christians to teach, but admitted that school attendance by Christian pupils was unavoidable. Arnobius, Lactantius, and Cassianus were classical Christian teachers.

During the fourth century the value of secular literature began to be questioned by Biblical scholars. This opposition is condensed in the accepted translation, dating from Jerome from Psalm 70:15-16 Quoniam non cognovi litteraturam, introibo in potentias Domini; Domine memorabor justitiae tuae solius. (Because I have not known learning I will enter into the powers of the LORD: O LORD I will be mindful of thy justice alone. Douay-Rheims 1899) The opposition between divine judgement and literature became gradually an accepted Christian idea.

Later persecution under Julian led Christian writers to express more definitely their views on the subject. It produced little effect in the West. However, Marius Victorinus, one of the most distinguished professors in Rome, chose "to give up the idle talk of the school rather than the Word of God." Thenceforth, Christians studied more closely and more appreciatively their own literature, i.e., the Biblical writings. Jerome discovers therein a Horace, a Catullus and an Alcaeus. In his De doctrina christiana Augustine shows how the Scriptures could be turned to account for the study of eloquence; he analyses periods of the prophet Amos, of Paul, and shows excellent examples of rhetorical figures in the Pauline Epistles. It would seem that the Church, therefore, ought to have given up the study of pagan literature. It did not do so. Augustine suggested his method only to those who wished to become priests, and even for these he did mean to make it obligatory. Men of less marked ability were to use the ordinary method of instruction. The De doctrina christiana was written in 427, at which time his advancing age and the increasing strictness of monastic life might have inclined Augustine to a rigorous solution. Jerome's scruples and the dream he relates in one of his letters are quite well known. In this dream he saw angels scourging him and saying: "Thou art not a Christian, thou art a Ciceronian." He finds fault with ecclesiastics who find too keen a pleasure in the reading of Virgil; he adds, nevertheless, that youths are indeed compelled to study him. In his quarrel with Rufinus he declares that he has not read the profane authors since he left school, "but I admit that I read them while there. Must I then drink the waters of Lethe that I may forget?"

In defending himself the first figure that occurs to him is taken from mythology. What these eminent men desired was not so much the separation but the combination of the treasures of profane literature and of Christian truth. Jerome recalls the precept of Deuteronomy: "If you desire to marry a captive, you must first shave her head and eyebrows, shave the hair on her body and cut her nails, so must it be done with profane literature, after having removed all that was earthly and idolatrous, unite with her and make her fruitful for the Lord." Augustine uses another Biblical allegory. For him, the Christian who seeks his knowledge in the pagan authors resembles the Israelites who despoil the Egyptians of their treasures in order to build the tabernacle of God. As to Ambrose, he has no doubts whatever. He quotes quite freely from Seneca, Virgil, and the Consolatio of Servius Sulpicius. He accepts the earlier view handed down from the Hebrew apologists to their Christian successors, viz., that whatever is good in the literature of antiquity comes from the Sacred Books. Pythagoras was a Jew or, at least, had read Moses. The pagan poets owe their flashes of wisdom to David and Job. Tatian, following earlier Jews had learnedly confirmed this view, and it recurs, more or less developed, in the other Christian apologists. In the West Minucius Felix gathered carefully into his Octavius whatever seemed to show harmony between the new doctrine and ancient learning. This was a convenient argument and served more than one purpose.

But this concession presupposed that pagan studies were subordinate to Christian truth, the "Hebraica veritas". In the second book of his De doctrina christiana, Augustine explains how pagan classics lead to a more perfect apprehension of the Scriptures, and are indeed an introduction to them. In this sense Jerome, in a letter to Magnus, professor of eloquence at Rome, recommends the use of profane authors; profane literature is a captive. Indeed, men neither dared nor were able to do without classical teaching. Rhetoric continued to inspire a kind of timid reverence. The panegyrists, for example, do not trouble themselves about the emperor's religion, but addressed him as pagans would a pagan and draw their literary embellishments from mythology. Theodosius himself did not dare to exclude pagan authors from the school. A professor like Ausonius pursued the same methods as his pagan predecessors. Magnus Felix Ennodius, deacon of Milan under Theodoric and later Bishop of Pavia, inveighed against the impious person who carried a statue of Minerva to a disorderly house, and himself under pretext of an "epithalamium" wrote light and trivial verses. It is true that Christian society at the time of the barbarian invasions repudiated mythology and ancient culture, but it did not venture to completely banish them. In the meantime the public schools of antiquity were gradually closed. Private teaching took their place but even that formed its pupils, e.g. Sidonius Apollinaris, according to the traditional method. Christian asceticism, however, developed a strong feeling against secular studies. As early as the fourth century Martin of Tours finds that men have better things to do than study. There are lettered monks at Lérins, but their scholarship is a relic of their early education, not acquired after their monastic profession. The Rule of Benedict prescribes reading, it is true, but only sacred reading. Gregory the Great condemns the study of literature so far as bishops are concerned. Isidore of Seville condenses all ancient culture into a few data gathered into his Origines, just enough to prevent all further study in the original sources. Cassiodorus alone shows a far wider range and makes possible a deeper and broader study of letters. His encyclopedic grasp of human knowledge links him with the best literary tradition of pagan antiquity. He planned a close union of secular and sacred science whence ought to issue a complete and truly Christian method of teaching. Unfortunately the invasions of the barbarians followed and the Institutiones of Cassiodorus remained a mere project.

== Middle Ages ==
About the middle of the sixth century, the first indication of classical culture were seen in Britain, and, towards the close of the century, in Ireland. Irish scholars and then teachers, created a culture which the Anglo-Saxons developed. This culture placed literature and science at the service of theology and exegesis. They devoted themselves chiefly to grammar, rhetoric, and dialectics.

It is quite unlikely that manuscripts had been brought to Ireland between 350 and 450, to bring about a much later literary renaissance. The small ecclesiastical schools almost everywhere preserved elementary teaching, reading and writing. Irish scholarship went far beyond that.

During the sixth and seventh centuries, manuscripts were still being copied in continental Europe. The writing of this period is uncial or semi-uncial. Even after eliminating fifth- century manuscripts there still remains a fair number of manuscripts in this style of writing. We find among these works practical information: glossaries, treatises on land-surveying, medicine, the veterinary art, juridical commentaries.

On the other hand, the numerous ecclesiastical manuscripts prove the persistence of certain scholarly traditions. The continuations of sacred studies sufficed to bring about the Carolingian Renaissance. It was likewise a purely ecclesiastical culture which the Irish brought back to the continent in the sixth and seventh centuries. The chief aim of these Irish monks was to preserve and develop religious life. When the scattered items of information are examined, especially the hagiological indications, their importance is peculiarly diminished, for the teaching in question generally concerns Scripture or theology. Even Columbanus does not seem to have organized literary studies in his monasteries. The Irish monks had a personal culture which they did not make any effort to diffuse, owing to the great distance between centers of learning. Moreover, the disciples of the Irish were men enamoured of ascetic mortification, who shunned an evil world and sought a life of prayer and penance. For such minds, beauty of language and verbal rhythm were frivolous attractions. The material equipment of the Irish religious establishments in Gaul scarcely admitted any other study than that of the Scriptures. Generally these establishments were but a group of huts surrounding a small chapel.

Thus, until Charlemagne and Alcuin, intellectual life was confined to Great Britain and Ireland. It was revived in Gaul in the eighth century, when the classic Latin literature was again studied. Pagan authors were read as secondary to Scripture and theology. Even towards the close of his life, Alcuin forbade his monks to read Virgil. Statius is the favourite poet, and, before long, Ovid, whose licentiousness is glossed over by allegorical interpretation. Mediocre abstracts and compilations, products of academic decadence, appear among the books frequently read, e.g. Homerus latinus (Ilias Latina), Dictys, Dares, the distichs ascribed to Cato. Cicero is almost overlooked, and two distinct personages are made of Tullius and Cicero. There were a number of classical authors studied until the thirteenth century.

At the close of the twelfth century, in the early years of the University of Paris, the principal known authors are:

- Statius
- Virgil
- Lucian
- Juvenal
- Horace
- Ovid
- Sallust
- Cicero
- Martial
- Petronius
- Symmachus
- Solinus
- Sidonius
- Suetonius
- Quintus Curtius
- Trogus Pompeius
- Livy
- Seneca the Elder
- Seneca the Younger
- Donatus
- Priscian
- Boethius
- Quintilian
- Euclid
- Ptolemy

In the thirteenth century the influence of Aristotle restricted the field of reading.

There are, however, a few real Humanists among the medieval writers. Einhard (770-840), Rabanus Maurus (776-856), the ablest scholar of his time, and Walafrid Strabo (809-849) are men of extensive and disinterested learning. Servatus Lupus, Abbot of Ferrières (805-862), in his quest for Latin manuscripts labours as zealously as any scholar of the fifteenth century. At a later period Latin literature is represented by Remigius of Auxerre (d. 908), Gerbert (later Pope Sylvester II d. 1003), Liutprand of Cremona (d. about 972), John of Salisbury (1110–1180), Vincent of Beauvais (d. 1264), and Roger Bacon (d. 1294). Medieval Latin poetry drew its inspiration from Latin poetry. Among the imitations must be mentioned the works of Hroswitha (or Roswitha), Abbess of Gandersheim (close of the tenth century), whom Virgil, Prudentius, and Sedulius inspired to celebrate the acts of Otho the Great. She is of particular interest in the history of the survival of Latin literature, because of her comedies after the manner of Terence. It has been said that she wished to cause the pagan author to be totally forgotten. This statement is not reconcilable with her known simplicity of character. A certain facility in the dialogue and clearness of style do not offset the lack of ideas in her writings. They exhibit the fate of classical culture in the Middle Ages. Hroswitha imitates Terence, indeed but without understanding him, and in a ridiculous manner. The poems on actual life of Hugh of Orléans known as "Primas" or "Archipoeta" are far superior and betray genuine talent as well as an intelligent grasp of Horace.

During the Middle Ages, the Church preserved secular literature by harboring and copying its works in monasteries, where valuable libraries existed as early as the ninth century:

- in Italy, at Monte Cassino (founded in 529), and at Bobbio founded in 612 by Columbanus);
- in Germany at Saint Gall (614), Reichenau (794), Fulda (744), Lorsch (763), Hersfeld (768), Corvey (822), Hirschau (8430);
- in France at St. Martin of Tours (founded in 372, but later restored), Fleury or Saint-Benoît-sur-Loire (620), Ferrières (630), Corbie (662), Cluny (910).

The reforms of Cluny and later of Clairvaux were not favourable to studies. The chief aim of the reformers was to combat the secular spirit and re-establish strict religious observances. This influence is in harmony with the tendencies of scholasticism. Consequently, from the twelfth century and especially the thirteenth, the copying of manuscripts became a secular business, a source of gain. The following is a list of the most ancient or most useful manuscripts of the Latin classics for the Middle Ages:

- Eighth-ninth centuries: Cicero's Orations, Horace, the philosopher Seneca, Martial.
- Ninth century: Terence, Lucretius, Cicero, Sallust, Livy, Ovid, Lucan, Valerius Maximus, Columella, Persius, the philosopher Seneca, Pliny the Elder, Quintus Curtius, the Thebaid of Statius, Silius Italicus, Pliny the Younger, Juvenal, Tacitus, Suetonius, Florus, Claudian.
- Ninth-Tenth centuries: Persius, Quintus Curtius, Caesar, Cicero, Horace, Livy, Phaedrus, Lucan, the philosopher Seneca, Valerius Flaccus, Martial, Justin, Ammianus Marcellinus.
- Tenth century: Caesar Catullus, Cicero, Sallust, Lio, Ovid, Lucan, Persius, Quintus Curtius, Pliny the Elder, Quintilian, Statius, Juvenal.
- Eleventh century: Caesar, Sallust, Livy, Ovid, Tacitus, Apuleius.
- Thirteenth century: Cornelius Nepos, Propertius, Varro, "De lingua latina".

This list is incomplete. An author like Quintus Curtius is represented by numerous manuscripts in every century. Another, like Lucretius, was not copied anew between the ninth century and the Renaissance. Moreover, it was customary to compile manuscripts of epitomes and anthologies, some of which have preserved the only extant fragments of ancient authors. The teaching of grammar was deficient. This may account for the backwardness of philological science in the Middle Ages. Latin grammar is reduced to an abridgment of Donatius, supplemented by the meagre commentaries of the teacher, and replaced since the thirteenth century by the "Doctrinale" of Alexander de Villedieu (de Villa Dei).
