= J. Steven Wilkins =

American pastor

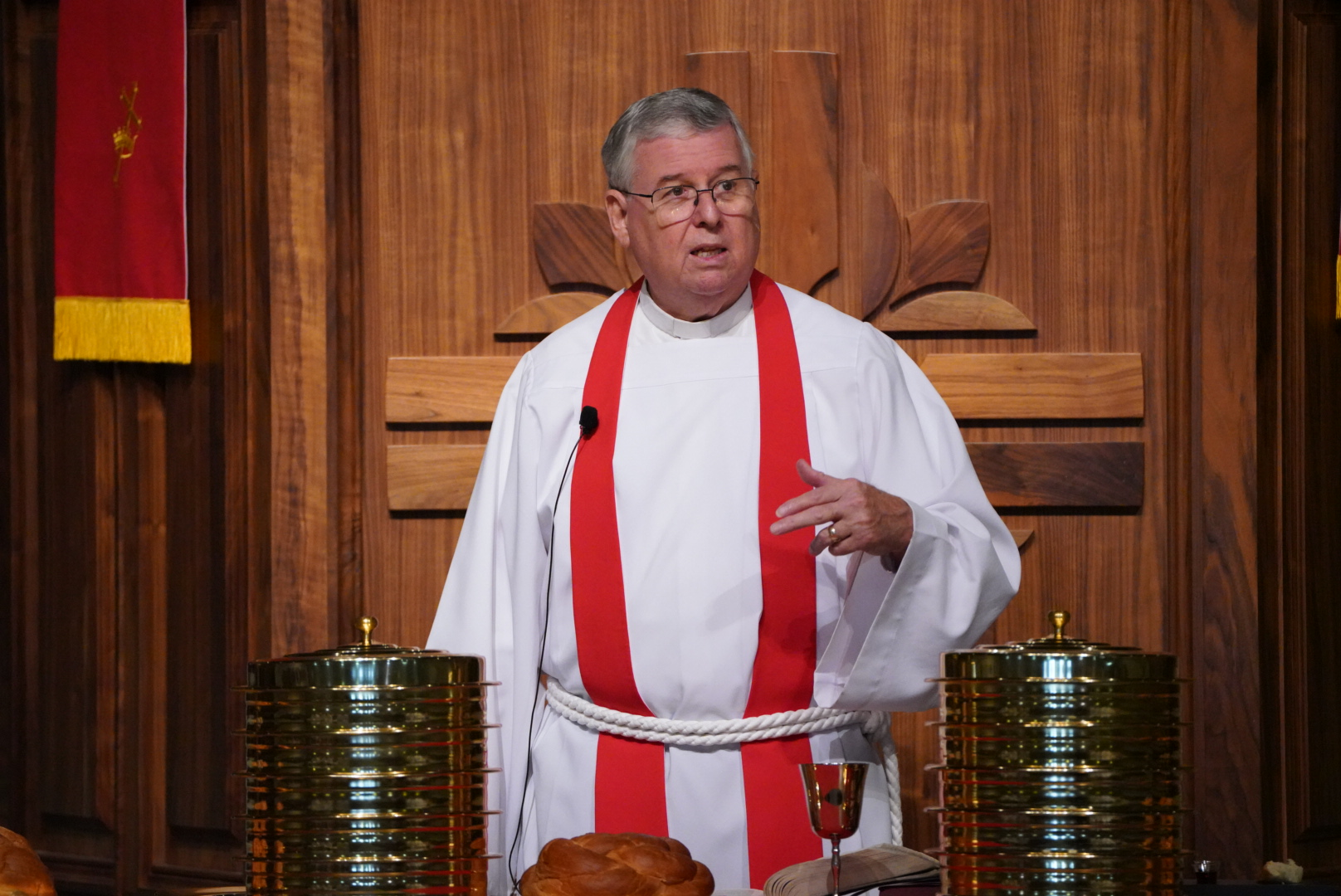
Pastor Steve Wilkins at the communion table at Church of the Redeemer in West Monroe, LA.

J. Steven Wilkins (born 27 June 1950) is an American Calvinist and evangelical pastor and author.

== Biography ==
Steve Wilkins holds degrees from the University of Alabama and the Reformed Theological Seminary of Jackson, Mississippi. He was ordained as a minister in the Presbyterian Church in America in 1976, and has served as the pastor of Church of the Redeemer in West Monroe, Louisiana since 1989.

Wilkins is an advocate of Federal Vision theology. He has been called an advocate of Christian Reconstruction.

In 2007, the Louisiana Presbytery was indicted by the PCA's Standing Judicial Commission for "failing to find a strong presumption of guilt" against Wilkins with regards to his theological views. Following this action, the congregation of Church of the Redeemer voted without dissent to withdraw from the PCA on January 27, 2008 and subsequently joined the Communion of Reformed Evangelical Churches. Within the CREC, Wilkins is the Presiding Minister of Wycliffe Presbytery.

He is a former board member of the League of the South and founder of the Southern Heritage Society. His biography on Robert E. Lee, titled Call of Duty, was called "hagiographical" and omitted any criticism.

In the pamphlet Southern Slavery, As It Was, Wilkins and co-author Douglas Wilson argued for a view that the status of slaves had not been as bad as is currently taught in American schools. He stated for example that: "slavery produced in the South a genuine affection between the races that we believe we can say has never existed in any nation before the War or since." Historians such as Peter H. Wood, Clayborne Carson, and Bancroft Prize winner Ira Berlin have condemned the pamphlet's arguments, with Wood calling them as spurious as Holocaust denial.

Canon Press ceased publication of the pamphlet when it became aware of serious citation errors in 24 passages authored by Wilkins where quotations, some lengthy, from the 1974 book Time on the Cross: The Economics of American Negro Slavery by Robert William Fogel and Stanley L. Engerman were not cited. Robert McKenzie, the history professor who first noticed the citation problems, described the authors as being "sloppy" rather than "malevolent" while also pointing out that he had reached out to Wilson several years earlier. Wilson reworked and redacted the arguments and published (without Wilkins) a new set of essays under the name Black & Tan after consulting with historian Eugene Genovese.

== Writings ==
Wilkins is the author of

- Face to Face: Meditations on Friendship and Hospitality (ISBN 978-1591280002)
- Call of Duty: The Sterling Nobility of Robert E. Lee (ISBN 978-1581823349)
- All Things for Good: The Steadfast Fidelity of Stonewall Jackson (ISBN 978-1581822250)
- The Federal Vision (ISBN 978-0975391402) (editor)
- Southern Slavery, As It Was (ISBN 978-1885767172)
