= Association of Classical Christian Schools =

Organization that encourages the formation of Christian schools

The Association of Classical Christian Schools (ACCS) is a membership, accreditation, and advocacy organization that was founded in 1993 by Doug Wilson to promote Classical Christian education. The association's website lists 475 member schools (as of 2023). As of 2016, it had accredited about 200 schools.

It also affiliates with colleges. Its Certified College program includes New Saint Andrews College (Moscow, ID), New College Franklin (Franklin, TN), and Bethlehem College & Seminary (Minneapolis, MN).

The ACCS conducts Repairing the Ruins, an annual conference in June that draws between 1000 and 1300 classical educators annually. The ACCS's magazine, "The Classical Difference", is published three times a year and distributed to parents at associated schools.

== Boniface Award ==
Since 2019, the ACCS has given the Boniface Award to "a public figure who has stood faithfully for Christian truth, beauty, and goodness with grace." Named after Saint Boniface, previous winners have been:

- 2019: Douglas Wilson
- 2020: Rosaria Butterfield
- 2021: Michael Farris
- 2022: Voddie Baucham
- 2023: Al Mohler
- 2024: Megan Basham
- 2025: Calvin Robinson
