= Canon Press =

Christian publishing company

- Founded: 1988; 38 years ago
- Founder: Doug Wilson
- Country of origin: United States
- Headquarters location: Moscow, Idaho
- Key people: Jess Hall, CEO
- Publication types: Books
- Imprints: Logos Press; Canonball Books; Noeo Science; Logos Online School
- Official website: canonpress.com

Canon Press is a Christian publishing house in Moscow, Idaho. It was founded by Doug Wilson in 1988 as a literature ministry of his Christ Church. It has published more than 100 books by Wilson and his family members. Canon Press was sold in 2012 and continues to operate as a private company owned by Aaron Rench and N. D. Wilson.

Two books published by Canon Press were found to contain significant portions of uncited work by other authors and were subsequently retracted and remaindered: Southern Slavery As It Was (1996), co-authored by Doug Wilson and Steve Wilkins and A Justice Primer (2015), co-authored by Doug Wilson and Randy Booth.

In 2021, the company said that its opposition to identity politics and COVID-19 pandemic restrictions allowed its workforce to be "free to work", and that it had tripled in size since 2019.

As a marketing initiative, Canon Press put up billboards across the United States in 2023 with the words "Christ is Lord" in bold white letters on a black background, along with a URL. The campaign was a promotion for Doug Wilson's book Mere Christendom, which one theology professor said promotes Christian nationalism.

In September 2025 Canon Press made an unsuccessful bid to purchase Christianity Today for $10 million.

== Fields ==
Canon Press publishes books and teaching materials to support the classical Christian education movement through its Logos Press imprint, inspired by the success of the Logos School.

== Notable books ==
- The Shape of Sola Scriptura by Keith Mathison (2001)
- The Case for Christian Nationalism by Stephen Wolfe (2022)

Canonball Books imprint

- The Silent Bells by N. D. Wilson (2020)
