= Classical Christian education =

Christian approach to teaching informed by classical tradition

Classical Christian education is a learning approach popularized in the late 20th century that emphasizes biblical teachings and incorporates a teaching model from the classical education movement known as the Trivium, consisting of three parts: grammar, logic, and rhetoric.

According to Douglas Wilson this method of instruction was developed by early Christians as part of the Seven Liberal Arts. Wilson's writings and the Logos School he founded have been cited as being influential in reviving the Trivium and fueling a modern educational movement, primarily among American Protestants.

Classical Christian education is characterized by a reliance on classical works by authors such as Homer, Democritus, Sophocles, Plato, Plotinus, Josephus, Dante, Pythagoras and Shakespeare, and an integration of a Christian worldview into all subjects. In addition, classical Christian education exposes students to Western Civilization's history, art and culture, teaching Latin as early as the second grade and often offering several years of Greek.

== Philosophy ==
The modern Classical-Christian educational movement has its roots in the mid to late twentieth century. Its popularity was fueled by the publication in 1991 of a book entitled Recovering the Lost Tools of Learning by Doug Wilson. In it he expanded on a paper titled "The Lost Tools of Learning" written by Dorothy Sayers. She lamented that the “great defect of our education" was that schools taught information, but did not teach students how to think. Wilson described an educational model based on the child's developmental capabilities and natural inclinations:

- From birth, the child learns language and about itself.
- From about age 2 to age 4, the child develops social skills and gains mobility and dexterity.
- The Grammar stage begins around age 5. In this stage, the child is in a "parrot" stage of repeating what they are told. This phase sees them enjoying simple songs over and over, so songs, rhymes and memory aid teach the basics of reading, writing, numbers and math, and observational science. Many schools begin Latin language training in 3rd grade. Some schools will also teach a Christian Catechism while students are in this phase, as foundation for intensive study of the texts and structures of the Bible.
- The Logic stage begins in 6th grade. At this age, students naturally develop an argumentative behavior, and are equipped with tools of logic and how to formulate a defense for an idea. This provides the foundation for Sayers' 'teaching them to think' model.

The classical Christian education movement has also been influenced by Norms and Nobility by David V. Hicks as well as the CiRCE Institute founded by Andrew Kern, which exists to promote classical Christian education. In 2013, Kevin Clark and Ravi Jain authored The Liberal Arts Tradition, which has been described by reviewer Jason Barney as "a must read for any educator in the classical Christian school movement".

== The Association of Classical Christian Schools (ACCS) ==
The Association of Classical Christian Schools is a membership and accreditation organization that represents the movement. It had accredited 200 schools as of 2016.

== See also ==
- Christian views on the classics
- Western education

== Bibliography ==
- Norms and Nobility: A Treatise on Education (1981), by David V. Hicks
- Recovering the Lost Tools of Learning (1991), by Douglas Wilson
- The Case for Classical Christian Education (2003), by Douglas Wilson
- Classical Education: The Movement Sweeping America by Gene Edward Veith Jr. and Andrew Kern
- An Introduction to Classical Education: A Guide for Parents (2005), by Christopher Perrin
- Wisdom and Eloquence (2006), by Charles Evans and Robert Littlejohn
- The Well-Trained Mind: A Guide to Classical Education at Home (2009), by Susan Wise Bauer and Jessie Wise
- The Core: Teaching Your Child the Foundations of Classical Education (2011), by Leigh Bortins
- The Liberal Arts Tradition (Classical Academic Press, 2013), by Kevin Clark and Ravi Scott Jain
- The Question: Teaching Your Child the Essentials of Classical Education (2013), by Leigh Bortins
- The Conversation: Challenging Your Student with a Classical Education (2015), by Leigh Bortins
