= Douglas Wilson (theologian) =

American theologian (born 1953)

The Reverend Douglas Wilson
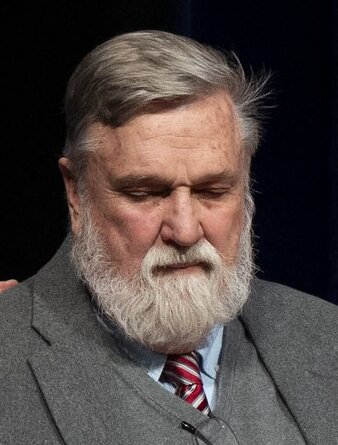
- Wilson at the Pentagon in 2026
- Born: Douglas James Wilson; 1953 (age 72–73)
- Education: University of Idaho
- Occupations: Theologian; pastor; author
- Spouse: Nancy Wilson
- Children: 3, including N. D. Wilson
- Ordination: CREC
- Theological work
- Era: Late 20th and early 21st centuries
- Tradition or movement: Reformed (Presbyterianism)
- Main interests: Covenant theology; Theonomy
- Notable ideas: Federal Vision

Douglas James Wilson (born 1953) is an American conservative Reformed and evangelical Christian theologian and pastor. Wilson leads Christ Church in Moscow, Idaho, in which capacity he has taken leading roles in the Communion of Reformed Evangelical Churches and the classical Christian education movement. He is a public proponent of postmillennialism, Christian nationalism, covenant theology, and biblical patriarchy. Wilson, a self-described "paleo-Confederate", garnered extensive media coverage in 2004, when his annual history conference publicized his controversial stance on American slavery.

== Biography ==
Douglas Wilson was born in 1953. In 1958 his family moved to Annapolis, Maryland, where he spent most of his childhood. His father, Jim Wilson, was a full-time evangelist who worked with the Officers' Christian Union. His father had become a Christian in the Naval Academy and worked in Christian literature ministry both in Annapolis and later in Idaho. His father moved to the Moscow, Idaho, area after leaving the Navy to start a Christian bookstore on the Washington State University campus.

Upon graduating high school, Wilson enlisted in the Navy and served on the USS Tusk and the USS Ray. He graduated from the University of Idaho and married Nancy in 1975.

Wilson then became part of an Evangelical Free Church plant in Moscow, which eventually became Christ Church. Wilson began preaching there in the late 1970s, initially espousing a Baptist theological framework inspired by the charismatic Jesus People movement. In 1988, the controversy surrounding openness theology inspired Wilson to take a more conservative, Reformed stance. In 1993, he began baptizing infants and espousing a presbyterian model of church governance. In 1998, he began relationships between Christ Church and two other nearby congregations in Washington, marking the establishment of the Communion of Reformed Evangelical Churches (CREC).

Parallel to his pastoral roles, Wilson has established a number of classical Christian educational institutions connected to Christ Church. Logos School, one of the first schools associated with the classical Christian education movement, was founded in 1981. He also played a role in establishing New Saint Andrews College, a liberal arts college, and Greyfriars Hall, a ministry training program; Wilson teaches at both institutions. He also established Canon Press, a Christian publishing house, and cofounded the Reformed cultural and theological journal Credenda/Agenda.

In early 2004, Wilson's ninth annual history conference at the University of Idaho included his co-author of the tract Southern Slavery as it Was, J. Steven Wilkins, as a speaker. Their views on slavery caused significant controversy. The university published a disclaimer distancing itself from the event, and numerous anti-conference protests took place. Wilson described critical attacks as "abolitionist propaganda".

In 2009, he was featured in the documentary film Collision, which documented his debates with New Atheist author Christopher Hitchens on his promotional tour for the book Is Christianity Good for the World?

In the midst of the COVID-19 pandemic, Wilson attracted attention in October 2020 for leading a maskless worship service at Moscow City Hall, which more than 150 people attended. Wilson had warned attendees of the possibility they could be cited for not wearing a mask or social distancing. Three people were arrested and five were cited for violating Moscow's mask mandate and social distancing order. Following a civil rights lawsuit over the arrests, the city of Moscow settled with the plaintiffs for $300,000.

In the 2020s, especially after the second election of Donald Trump, Wilson has been a subject of frequent press coverage as one of the self-professed leading figures of the Christian nationalist movement. He has been received sympathetically by prominent conservatives including Tucker Carlson and Pete Hegseth, the latter of whom has attended CREC churches in Nashville and Washington DC. In 2025, Hegseth shared a video promoting the CREC and featuring Wilson. In February 2026, Wilson was featured as a guest pastor for the Pentagon's newly instituted monthly Christian worship service, where he prayed alongside Hegseth.

Concerns about Wilson's personal safety due to his comments on slavery, as well as criticisms from both liberals and conservatives, led to the Visão Nacional para a Consciência Cristã's rescinding his invitation to speak at a large Reformed theological gathering in Brazil in February 2024.

Wilson's views have received attention from European media. In September 2025, he was depicted on the cover of Der Spiegel as one of the "archconservative Bible fanatics" (erzkonservative Bibelfanatiker) surrounding Donald Trump. In February 2026, Wysokie Obcasy stated that Wilson was "known for his radical views on the place of women in family life".

Wilson has authored books on theology and culture, as well as children's and poetry books. He blogs and is a frequent guest at conferences and on podcasts. He is known for his "No Quarter November" videos in which he lights a large object (such as a boat or a truck) on fire, as a metaphor for the destruction of secular culture.

== Classical Christian education ==
Wilson has been an advocate for classical Christian education, laying out his vision in several books and pamphlets, including Recovering the Lost Tools of Learning and The Case for Classical Christian Education. He has also critiqued the American public school system by urging Christian parents to seek other educational options in Excused Absence: Should Christian Kids Leave Public Schools?. He argues that American public schools are failing to educate students and proposes a Christian approach to education based on the medieval trivium, a philosophy of education with origins in classical antiquity that emphasizes grammar, logic, and rhetoric and advocates wide exposure to the liberal arts, including classical Western languages such as Latin and Greek. The model has been adopted by a number of Christian private schools and homeschoolers. Wilson founded the Logos School in Moscow in 1981 to fulfill his vision. He helped found the Association of Classical Christian Schools (ACCS) in 1993. Their website lists 532 member schools (as of 2024).

Wilson received the inaugural Boniface Award from the ACCS in 2019. The award is given to recognize "a public figure who has stood faithfully for Christian truth, beauty, and goodness with grace".

== Theology ==
Wilson has written on numerous theological subjects and produced several biblical commentaries. He advocates Van Tillian presuppositional apologetics. He has written extensively in defense of covenant theology, infant baptism, and Calvinism in works such as The Covenant Household, Knowledge, Foreknowledge, and the Gospel, and To a Thousand Generations: Infant Baptism.

Wilson has engaged in extensive critique and debate with prominent New Atheists. In May 2007, Wilson debated Christopher Hitchens in a six-part series published first in Christianity Today, and subsequently as a book entitled Is Christianity Good for the World? with a foreword by Jonah Goldberg. His book Letter from a Christian Citizen was Wilson's response to atheist Sam Harris's Letter to a Christian Nation, and his book The Deluded Atheist was his response to Richard Dawkins's The God Delusion.

Wilson holds to a view of Christian eschatology known as postmillennialism. He has set forth his position in Heaven Misplaced: Christ's Kingdom on Earth, in his commentary on Revelation, When the Man Comes Around, and his commentary on First and Second Thessalonians, Mines of Difficulty. He has spoken and written in defense of the view, participating in a dialogue about eschatology with other evangelical ministers John Piper, Sam Storms, and Jim Hamilton as the representative of the postmillennial position.

Wilson's views on covenant theology have caused controversy as part of the Federal Vision theology, partly because of its perceived similarity to the New Perspective on Paul, which Wilson does not fully endorse, though he has praised some of its tenets. The Reformed Presbyterian Church in the United States's Covenant Presbytery declared his views on the subject to have "the effect of destroying the Reformed Faith" and found his teachings to be heretical.

Wilson is an adherent of biblical patriarchy. He believes that wives should submit to their husbands and that leadership roles in the church should be restricted to men. In his 1999 book, Federal Husband, Wilson argued that a husband as "federal head" assumes responsibility for his wife's spiritual condition. Wilson would like to see the Nineteenth Amendment to the United States Constitution which gave women the right to vote repealed, though he is not calling for its immediate repeal. Instead, he would prefer household voting. Wilson has praised the 1969 Stonewall raids, and called for restoring sodomy laws, though not "aggressively enforced".

In a 2025 CNN interview, Wilson said he has embraced the term Christian nationalist because "it's better than the other names he gets called", stating, "I'm not a White nationalist. I'm not a fascist. I'm not a racist. I'm not a misogynist, and those are the names that usually get thrown at me ... and then when someone says, well, that's Christian nationalism, I can – well, I can work with that." Wilson calls the United States a "backslidden Christian republic".

Wilson is a vocal opponent of anti-semitism.

=== Southern slavery ===
In 1996, Wilson published a pamphlet Southern Slavery, As It Was, which he cowrote with Christian minister J. Steven Wilkins. Louis Markos notes that "though the pamphlet condemned racism and said the practice of Southern slavery was unbiblical, critics were troubled that it argued U.S. slavery was more benign than is usually presented in history texts". Some historians, such as Peter H. Wood, Clayborne Carson, and Ira Berlin, condemned the pamphlet's arguments, with Berlin saying the authors' "understanding of slavery is extremely anachronistic".

Wilson has repeatedly denied any racist leanings. He has said his "long war" is not on behalf of white supremacy; rather, Wilson claims to seek restoration of a prior era, during which he says faith and reason seemed at one and when family, church, and community were more powerful than the state. Although he is categorized by some as a neo-Confederate, he rejects that term and calls himself a paleo-confederate instead.

Canon Press ceased publication of Southern Slavery, As It Was when it became aware of at least 22 passages authored by Wilkins wherein quotations from the 1974 book Time on the Cross: The Economics of American Negro Slavery were not cited. Robert McKenzie, a history professor who had contacted Wilson regarding the citations problems, described the authors as being "sloppy" rather than "malevolent". After consulting with historian Eugene Genovese, Wilson reworked his arguments and published a new book titled Black & Tan, without Wilkins.

In a 2025 interview with CNN, Wilson stated "Slavery was overseen and conducted by fallen human beings, and there were horrendous abuses and there were also people who owned slaves who were decent human beings and didn't mistreat them. I think that system of chattel slavery was an unbiblical system, and I'm grateful it's gone."

== Personal life ==
Wilson and his wife, Nancy, married on New Year's Eve in 1975 and have three children and many grandchildren. His son Nathan Wilson is a writer of young adult literature.

In 2018, Wilson announced on his blog that he had been diagnosed with a cancerous tumor in his jaw. He wrote in response to the news:

Scripture teaches us that we are to give thanks in everything (1 Thess. 5:18), and for everything (Eph. 5:20). God really is sovereign in every detail of every life. So we have thanked the Lord for this cancer, and we intend to continue to thank Him for it. We don't know what good purpose God has for it, but we are assured that the One who counts both hairs and sparrows is also the One who controls the behavior of every cancer cell.

Later that year, Wilson had a successful operation removing the tumor, followed by a successful recovery.

== Published works ==
=== Author ===
- ——— (1989), ——— (ed.), No Stone Unturned: The CEF Symposium on Creation, et al, Canon Press
- ———; Nance, James B (2006) [1990, 1992, 1997], Introductory Logic for Christian and Home Schools, Canon, ISBN 978-1-59128-033-0.
- ——— (1991), Recovering the Lost Tools of Learning: An Approach to Distinctively Christian Education, Crossway, ISBN 978-0-89107-583-7.
- ——— (1995), Reforming Marriage, Canon, ISBN 978-1-885767-45-5.
- ———; Hagopian, David (1996), Beyond Promises: A Biblical Challenge to Promise Keepers, Canon, ISBN 1-885767-12-9.
- ——— (1996), ——— (ed.), Repairing the Ruins: The Classical and Christian Challenge to Modern Education, Canon, ISBN 978-1-885767-14-1.
- ———; Wilkins, Steve (1996), Southern Slavery: As It Was, Canon, ISBN 978-1-885767-17-2.
- ——— (1996b), Contours of Postmaturity: InterVarsity Press Comes of Age, Canon, ISBN 978-1-885767-20-2.
- ——— (1996c), To A Thousand Generations: Infant Baptism ~ Covenant Mercy to the Children of God, Canon, ISBN 978-1-885767-24-0.
- ——— (1997a), Standing on the Promises: A Handbook of Biblical Childrearing, Canon, ISBN 978-1-885767-25-7.
- ——— (1997b), Her Hand in Marriage: Biblical Courtship in the Modern World, Canon, ISBN 978-1-885767-26-4.
- ——— (1997c), Easy Chairs, Hard Words: Conversations on the Liberty of God, Canon, ISBN 978-1-885767-30-1.
- ——— (1997d), Persuasions: A Dream of Reason Meeting Unbelief, Canon, ISBN 978-1-885767-29-5.
- ———; Craig, Karen (1997), Latin Grammar for Christian and Home Schools (2nd ed.), Canon, ISBN 978-1-885767-37-0.
- ———; Jones, Douglas (1998), Angels in the Architecture: A Protestant Vision for Middle Earth, Canon, ISBN 978-1-885767-40-0.
- ——— (1999a), Joy at the End of the Tether: The Inscrutable Wisdom of Ecclesiastes, Canon, ISBN 978-1-885767-50-9.
- ——— (1999b), Federal Husband, Canon, ISBN 978-1-885767-51-6.
- ——— (1999c), The Paideia of God and Other Essays on Education, Canon, ISBN 978-1-885767-59-2.
- ——— (1999d), Fidelity: What It Means to be a One-Woman Man, Canon, ISBN 978-1-885767-64-6.
- ——— (2000), For Kirk and Covenant: The Stalwart Courage of John Knox, Leaders in Action, Cumberland House, ISBN 978-1-58182-058-4.
- ——— (2000), Knowledge, Foreknowledge, and the Gospel (monograph), Canon, ISBN 978-5-550-03324-1.
- ——— (2000), Exhortations: A Call to Maturity in Worship, Charles Nolan, ISBN 978-0-9677603-1-5.
- ——— (2001), Untune the Sky: Occasional, Stammering Verse, Veritas, ISBN 978-1-930710-69-6.
- ——— (2001b), Greyfriars Covenant: Essays on Evangelism and Apologetics, Greyfriars Hall.
- ——— (2001c), Beyond Stateliest Marble: The Passionate Femininity of Anne Bradstreet, Leaders in Action, Cumberland House, ISBN 978-1-58182-164-2.
- ——— (2001d), Mother Kirk: Essays on Church Life, Canon, ISBN 978-1-885767-72-1.
- ——— (2001e), ——— (ed.), Bound Only Once: The Failure of Open Theism, Canon, ISBN 978-1-885767-84-4.
- ——— (2001f), Excused Absence: Should Christian Kids Leave Public Schools?, Canon, ISBN 978-0-9702245-1-4.
- ———; Callihan, Wesley; Jones, Douglas (2001), Classical Education and the Homeschool, Canon, ISBN 978-1-885767-85-1.
- ——— (2002), "Reformed" is Not Enough: Recovering the Objectivity of the Covenant (PDF), Moscow, Idaho: Canon, ISBN 978-1-59128-005-7, archived from the original (PDF) on September 28, 2007.
- ——— (2002b), The Case for Classical Christian Education, Crossway, ISBN 978-1-58134-384-7.
- ——— (2003), A Serrated Edge: A Brief Defense of Biblical Satire and Trinitarian Skylarking, Canon, ISBN 978-1-59128-010-1.
- ——— (2003), Blackthorn Winter, Maritime, Veritas, ISBN 978-1-932168-10-5.
- ——— (2004), My Life for Yours: A Walk Though the Christian Home, Canon, ISBN 978-1-885767-90-5.
- ——— (2004), Wisdom Is A Woman And Other Short Essays On Marriage For Men, Canon, ISBN 978-1-59128-029-3.
- ———; Fischer, G Tyler, eds. (2005), Omnibus I: Biblical and Classical Civilizations, Veritas, ISBN 978-1-932168-42-6.
- ——— (2005), Black & Tan: A Collection of Essays and Excursions on Slavery, Culture War, and Scripture in America, Canon, ISBN 978-1-59128-032-3.
- ——— (2006), For a Glory and a Covering: A Practical Theology of Marriage, Canon, ISBN 978-1-59128-041-5.
- ——— (2007), Letter from a Christian Citizen: A Response to Letter to a Christian Nation by Sam Harris, American Vision, ISBN 978-0-915815-66-1.
- ——— (2008), The Deluded Atheist: A Response to Richard Dawkins' The God Delusion, American Vision, ISBN 978-0-915815-59-3.
- ——— (2008), God Is. How Christianity Explains Everything, American Vision, ISBN 978-0-915815-86-9.
- ———; Hitchens, Christopher (2008), Is Christianity Good for the World?, Canon, ISBN 978-1-59128-053-8.
- ——— (2008), A Primer on Worship and Reformation: Recovering the High Church Puritan, Canon, ISBN 978-1-59128-061-3.
- ——— (2008), Heaven Misplaced: Christ's Kingdom on Earth, Canon, ISBN 978-1-59128-083-5.
- ——— (2009), Five Cities that Ruled the World: How Jerusalem, Athens, Rome, London, and New York Shaped Global History, Thomas Nelson, ISBN 978-1-59555-136-8.
- ——— (2010), ——— (ed.), The Forgotten Heavens: Six Essays on Cosmology, Canon, ISBN 978-1-59128-071-2.
- ——— (2010), What I Learned in Narnia, Canon Press, ISBN 978-1-59128-079-8.
- ——— (2011), A Study Guide to Calvin's Institutes, Canon, ISBN 978-1-59128-086-6.
- ———; Wilson, N. D. (2011), The Rhetoric Companion: A Student's Guide to Power in Persuasion, Canon, ISBN 978-1-59128-078-1.
- ——— (2011), Wordsmithy: Hot Tips for the Writing Life, Canon, ISBN 978-1-59128-099-6.
- ——— (2012a), Future Men: Raising Boys to Fight Giants (revised ed.), Canon, ISBN 978-1-59128-110-8 Original edition, 2001, ISBN 978-1-885767-83-7.
- ——— (2012b), Evangellyfish, Canon, ISBN 978-1-59128-098-9.
- ——— (2012c), Father Hunger: Why God Calls Men to Love and Lead Their Families, Canon, ISBN 978-1-59555-476-5.
- ——— (2012d), God Rest Ye Merry: Why Christmas is the Foundation for Everything, Canon, ISBN 978-1-59128-127-6.
- ——— (2013a), Against the Church, Canon, ISBN 978-1-59128-141-2.
- ——— (2013b), Beowulf: A New Verse Rendering, Canon, ISBN 978-1-59128-130-6.
- ——— (2014a), Rules for Reformers, Canon, ISBN 978-1-59128-179-5.
- ——— (2014b), Westminster Systematics: Comments and Notes on the Westminster Confession, Canon, ISBN 978-1-59128-179-5.
- ——— (2015a), Writers to Read: Nine Names That Belong on Your Bookshelf, Canon, ISBN 978-1-43354-586-3.
- ——— (2015b), Papa Don't Pope: Why I'm Not a Roman Catholic (and Why the Future is Protestant), Canon, ISBN 978-1-59128-189-4.
- ——— (2016a), Same-sex Mirage: Phantasmagoria at the Altar & Some Biblical Responses, Canon, ISBN 978-1-94450-326-0.
- ——— (2016b), Confessions of a Food Catholic, Canon, ISBN 978-1-94450-347-5.
- ——— (2016c), Empires of Dirt: Secularism, Radical Islam, and the Mere Christendom Alternative, Canon, ISBN 978-1-59128-143-6.
- ——— (2016d), Flags Out Front: A Contrarian's Daydream, Canon, ISBN 978-1-94450-349-9.
- ——— (2016e), Worldview Guide for The Adventures of Huckleberry Finn, Canon, ISBN 978-1-94450-341-3.
- ——— (2017a), Decluttering Your Marriage = Canon, Canon Press & Book Service, ISBN 978-1-94764-410-6.
- ——— (2017b), So Come and Welcome to Jesus Christ: A Morning and Evening Devotional = Canon, Canon Press & Book Service, ISBN 978--194450-382-6.
- ———; Wilson, Nancy (2018a), Why Children Matter, Canon, ISBN 978-1-94764-442-7.
- ——— (2018b), Mere Fundamentalism: The Apostles' Creed and the Romance of Orthodoxy, Canon, ISBN 978-1-94764-408-3.
- ——— (2018c), No Quarter November: The 2018 Anthology, Canon, ISBN 978-1-94764-487-8.
- ——— (2019), When the Man Comes Around: A Commentary on the Book of Revelation, Canon, ISBN 978-1-94764-492-2.
- ——— (2020a), Ploductivity: A Practical Theology of Work and Wealth, Canon, ISBN 978-1-94764-404-5.
- ——— (2020b), Ride Sally Ride (Sex Rules), Canon, ISBN 978-1-95241-049-9.
- ——— (2020c), The Book of the Seventh Seal, Independently published, ISBN 979-8-68931-076-3.
- ——— (2021a), Excused Absence: Should Christian Kids Leave Public Schools?, Canon, ISBN 978-1-95488-713-8.
- ——— (2021b), Devoured by Cannabis: Weed, Liberty, and Legalization, Canon, ISBN 978-1-95488-701-5.
- ——— (2022), The Covenant Household, Canon, ISBN 978-1-95790-522-8.
- ——— (2023a), Mere Christendom, Canon, ISBN 978-1-95790-557-0.
- ——— (2023b), Barbary Jihad, Canon, ISBN 978-1-95790-529-7.
- ——— (2024a), American Milk and Honey: Antisemitism, the Promise of Deuteronomy, and the True Israel of God, Canon, ISBN 978-1-95790-587-7.
- ——— (2024b), Mines of Difficulty: A Commentary on First and Second Thessalonians, Canon, ISBN 978-1-95790-589-1.

=== Contributor ===
- ———; et al. (1996), Hagopian, David G. (ed.), Back to Basics: Rediscovering the Richness of the Reformed Faith, P&R, ISBN 978-0-87552-216-6.
- ———; et al. (2001), Johnson, Gary L. W.; White, R. Fowler (eds.), Whatever Happened to the Reformation?, P&R, ISBN 978-0-87552-183-1.
- ———; et al. (2003), Strawbridge, Gregg (ed.), The Case for Covenantal Infant Baptism, P&R, ISBN 978-0-87552-554-9.
- ———; et al. (2004), Wilkins, Steve; Garner, Duane (eds.), The Federal Vision, Athanasius, ISBN 978-0-9753914-0-2.
- ———; et al. (2004), Mathison, Keith A. (ed.), When Shall These Things Be?: A Reformed Response to Hyper-Preterism, P&R, ISBN 978-0-87552-552-5.
- ———; et al. (2006), Strawbridge, Gregg (ed.), The Case for Covenant Communion, Athanasius, ISBN 978-0-9753914-3-3.
- ———; et al. (2010), With Calvin in the Theater of God: The Glory of Christ and Everyday Life, Crossway, ISBN 978-1-4335-1412-8.

== Sources ==
- Gribben, Crawford (2021). Survival and Resistance in Evangelical America. New York, NY: Oxford University Press. doi:10.1093/oso/9780199370221.001.0001. ISBN 978-0-19-937022-1. OCLC 1184121845.
- Latah County Historical Society (September 14, 2015). Legendary Locals of Moscow. Arcadia Publishing. ISBN 978-1-4396-5319-7.
