= List of Calvinist educational institutions in North America =

This list describes educational institutions that explicitly associate themselves with Calvinism.

== Seminaries ==
Tertiary institutions that study theology as their primary focus include:

- Andrewes Hall
- Calvin Theological Seminary
- Canadian Reformed Theological Seminary
- Columbia Theological Seminary
- Covenant Baptist Theological Seminary
- Covenant Theological Seminary
- Cranmer Theological House
- Cummins Memorial Theological Seminary
- Erskine Theological Seminary
- Evangelical Theological College of Wales
- Farel Reformed Theological Seminary
- Geneva Reformed Seminary
- Greenville Presbyterian Theological Seminary
- International Reformed Baptist Seminary (formerly known as Institute for Reformed Baptist Studies)
- Knox Theological Seminary
- Louisville Presbyterian Theological Seminary
- The Master's Seminary
- McCormick Theological Seminary
- Mid-America Reformed Seminary
- Midwestern Baptist Theological Seminary
- New Brunswick Theological Seminary
- Northwest Theological Seminary
- Pittsburgh Theological Seminary
- Puritan Reformed Theological Seminary
- Protestant Reformed Theological School
- Princeton Theological Seminary
- Reformed Episcopal Seminary
- Reformed Evangelical Seminary
- Reformed Presbyterian Theological Seminary
- Reformed Theological Seminary
- Sangre de Cristo Seminary
- The Southern Baptist Theological Seminary
- Toronto Baptist Seminary and Bible College
- Union Presbyterian Seminary
- Western Theological Seminary
- Westminster Theological Seminary
- Westminster Seminary California
- Whitefield Theological Seminary

== Colleges and universities ==
Tertiary institutions that do not study theology as their primary focus include:

- Belhaven University
- Bethlehem College & Seminary
- Calvin University
- Central College
- Covenant College
- Dordt University
- Erskine College
- Geneva College
- Grove City College
- Hope College
- The King's College (New York City)
- The King's University (Edmonton)
- Kuyper College
- The Master's University
- New Saint Andrews College
- Northwestern College
- Providence Christian College
- Reformation Bible College
- Log College; The Log College & Seminary
- Trinity Christian College
- Trinity University (Texas)
- Ursinus College
- Whitefield College

== Secondary schools ==
- Philadelphia Montgomery Christian Academy (Philadelphia, Pennsylvania)
- Arrowhead Christian Academy (Redlands, California)
- Calvin Christian High School (Grandville, Michigan)
- Central Minnesota Christian High School (Prinsburg, Minnesota)
- Central Valley Christian Schools (Visalia, California)
- Chicago Christian High School (Palos Heights, Illinois)
- Covenant Christian High School (Grand Rapids, Michigan)
- Covenant Christian Academy (Westminster, California)
- Eastern Christian High School (North Haledon, New Jersey)
- Grand Rapids Christian High School (Grand Rapids, Michigan)
- Guido de Bres Christian High School (Hamilton, Ontario, Canada)
- Hamilton Christian High School (Hamilton, Ontario, Canada)
- Holland Christian High School (Holland, Michigan)
- Illiana Christian High School (Dyer, Indiana)
- Kalamazoo Christian High School (Kalamazoo, Michigan)
- Lansing Christian High School (Lansing, Michigan)
- London District Christian Secondary School (London, Ontario, Canada)
- Los Angeles Baptist High School (North Hills, California)
- Manhattan Christian High School (Churchill, Montana)
- Mars Hill Academy (Mason, Ohio)
- Netherlands Reformed Christian School (Pompton Plains, New Jersey)
- Northern Michigan Christian High School (McBain, Michigan)
- Plymouth Christian High School (Grand Rapids, Michigan)
- Rehoboth Christian School Rehoboth, New Mexico
- Ripon Christian High School (Ripon, California)
- South Christian High School (Grand Rapids, Michigan)
- Southwest Minnesota Christian High School (Edgerton, Minnesota)
- Timothy Christian High School (Elmhurst, Illinois)
- Toronto District Christian High School (Toronto, Ontario, Canada)
- Unity Christian High School (Hudsonville, Michigan)
- Valley Christian High School (Cerritos, California)
- Western Michigan Christian High School (Muskegon, Michigan)
- Westminster Academy (Fort Lauderdale, Florida)
- Zion Christian High School (Byron Center, Michigan)

== See also ==
- Association of Presbyterian Colleges and Universities
- List of Lutheran colleges and universities in the United States
