= Église réformée du Québec =

L'Église réformée du Québec, or "Reformed Church of Quebec", is a small conservative French-speaking Reformed Christian denomination located in the Canadian province of Quebec.

== History ==
Although Huguenot settlers came to New France at an early date, the revocation of the Edict of Nantes in 1685 outlawed Protestantism in France and its colonies. The British Conquest of 1760 allowed Protestant churches to form in Canada. A French-language Protestant movement began in 1841 and eventually 25 congregations and schools were formed within the Presbyterian Church in Canada. Mission interest then turned west and as a result the congregations declined in Québec, reaching a low point of three congregations in 1975.

Starting in 1978, mission efforts by the Presbyterian Church in Canada, the Presbyterian Church in America, and the Christian Reformed Church led to the creation of new French-speaking reformed congregations in Québec. Nine of these congregations, scattered in different regions of the province, broke ties with the Presbyterian Church in Canada and formed the Église réformée du Québec under the leadership of David Craig. The denomination came into existence officially on 6 November 1988.

Although officially independent from this denomination, Farel Reformed Theological Seminary has strong personal ties to the Reformed Church of Quebec through its founder David Craig.

== Churches, membership, affiliations ==
As of 2018, five congregations remain, in Montréal, Repentigny, Quebec City, Levis and St-Georges de Beauce, with a total membership of about 350. The denomination seeks to be a continuation of the French Huguenot tradition. Member church are a part of the NAPARC and the World Reformed Fellowship.

== Theology ==
The Reformed Church of Quebec is a conservative Reformed church and adheres to the Three Forms of Unity, the La Rochelle Confession of Faith, and the Westminster Standards. The RCQ accepts the ecumenical creeds as well:

- Apostles' Creed
- Nicene Creed
- Athanasian Creed
