= Rehoboth, New Mexico =

Unincorporated community in New Mexico, United States

- Unincorporated community
- Flag

- Location within New Mexico Location within the United States
- Coordinates: 35°31′44″N 108°39′17″W
- Country: United States
- State: New Mexico
- County: McKinley
- Elevation: 6,581 ft (2,006 m)
- Time zone: UTC-7 (Mountain (MST))
  - Summer (DST): UTC-6 (MDT)
- ZIP code: 87322
- Area code: 505
- GNIS feature ID: 902843

Rehoboth is an unincorporated community in McKinley County, New Mexico, United States. Rehoboth is located along Interstate 40, 5 miles (8.0 km) east of downtown Gallup. Rehoboth has a post office with ZIP code 87322. It has a population of 56 permanent residents.

== Education ==
The Rehoboth Christian School is located in Rehoboth.

The public school district is Gallup-McKinley County Schools. Zoned schools include : Indian Hills Elementary School, John F. Kennedy Middle School, and Hiroshi Miyamura High School.
