= Guido de Bres Christian High School =

School in Hamilton, Ontario, Canada

Coordinates: 43.20916°N 79.87285°W

Guido de Brès Christian High School is a Christian high school in Hamilton, Ontario, located off the Red Hill Valley Parkway, founded by members of the Canadian Reformed Churches. It is a privately funded school operated by the Guido de Brès Canadian Reformed High School Society which was formed in 1974. The school's attendees are primarily members of the Canadian and United Reformed churches. The school is named after Guido de Brès, a Belgian reformer who died as a martyr to the faith in 1567. He authored the Belgic Confession, one of the Three Forms of Unity. A statement from article 12 of this confession is inscribed on a wooden plaque in the front lobby that summarizes the school's vision: "to the end that man may serve his God." This plaque was presented to the school on the occasion of the building's official opening in October 1977. As of 2019, the school has over 400 students and 43 staff members. All courses are taught from a Reformed Christian perspective. The school motto is "Everything in Christ" to reflect this.
