= Rehoboth Christian School =

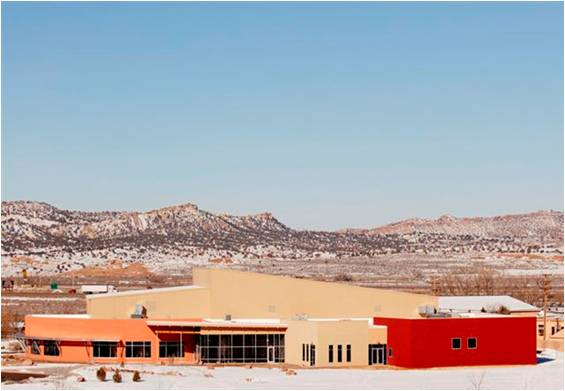
- Sport and Fitness Center

Location
- 7B Tse Yaaniichii Lane; Rehoboth, New Mexico 87322; United States; 35°31′44″N 108°39′17″W

Information
- Motto: Vigorously Academic, Beautifully Diverse, Thoroughly Christian
- Established: 1903
- President: Chris Vicente, School Board
- Director: Dan Meester
- Principal: Seth Weidenaar, High School, Tara DeYoung, Elementary-Middle School
- Grades: PreK–12
- Enrollment: 511
- Information: (505) 863-4412
- Website: http://www.rcsnm.org/

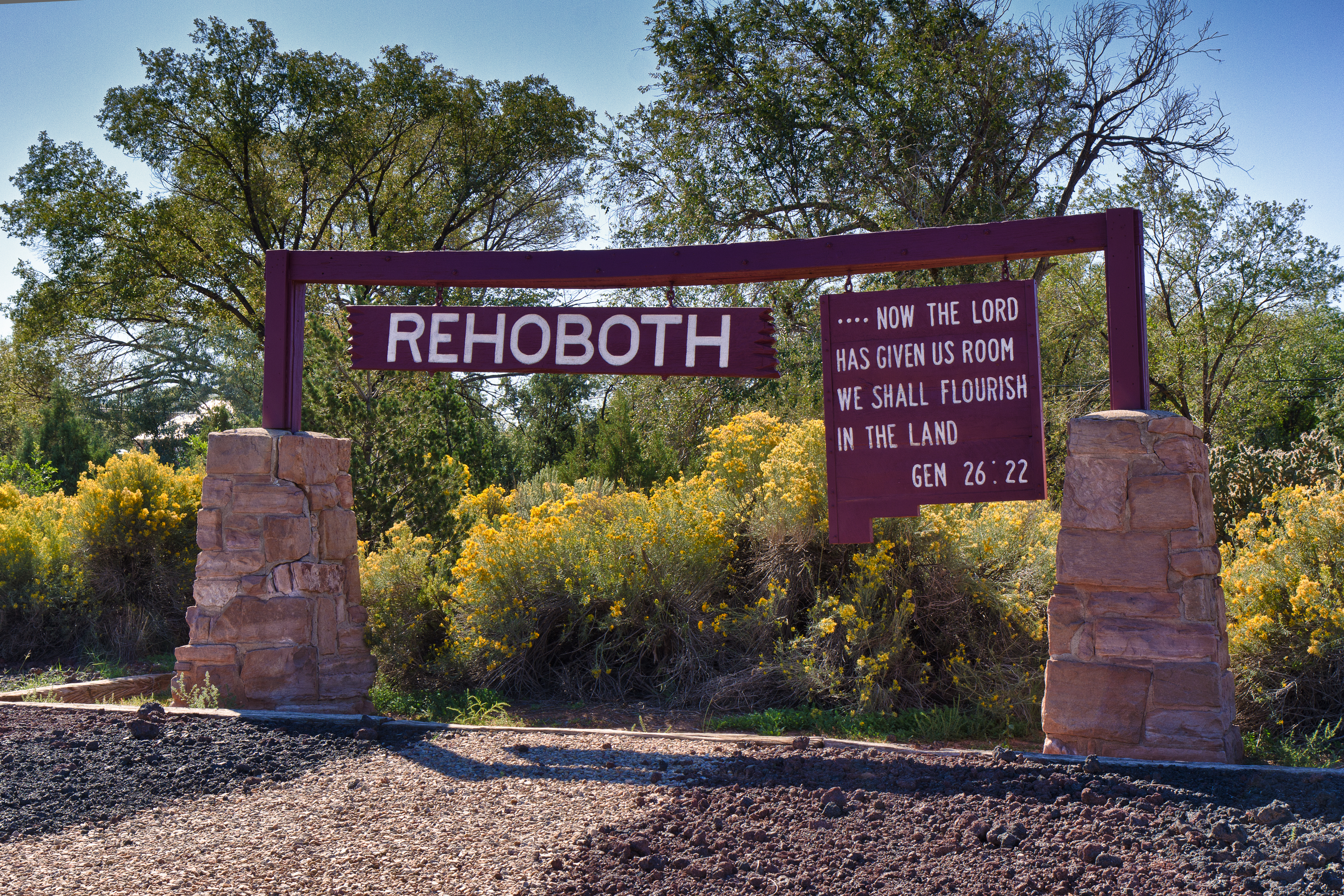
Entrance sign quoting Genesis 26:22

Rehoboth Christian School is a private, parent-controlled Christian school in Rehoboth, New Mexico. Founded in 1903 as Rehoboth Mission School, the school serves a portion of the Navajo Nation and its student body is predominantly Native American.

== History ==
The school was started as Rehoboth Mission School in 1903 by Christian Reformed Church (CRC) missionaries to the Navajo and Zuni people. The missionaries of Dutch descent named the settlement "Rehoboth", meaning "plenty of room", and the school's entrance sign (pictured) quotes Genesis 26:22, "Now the Lord has given us room, we shall flourish in the land". It was established on the 320-acre (130 ha) former Smith's Ranch, near Gallup, New Mexico, purchased by the CRC Board of Missions. It opened with six Navajo children aged 5 – 11. In its early years as an Indian boarding school, the children were forbidden to speak the Navajo language and were taught to eschew their native culture. In the 1940s, a high school was added. By 1985, enrollment had grown to 375 pupils, of whom 63% were Native Americans, mostly Navajo. In 2002, the school's then-executive director, Ron Polinder, was quoted as saying, "We came here 100 years ago with some cultural arrogance, expecting Native American people to become like white people". Courses in the Navajo language were added to the high school's curriculum in 2002 and since expanded to encompass all grades. The school is now "committed to respecting Native culture and language", its website states.

As of 2020, there are 511 students in grades Pre K-12. In the 1970s, control transitioned to a local school board largely made up of Native American parents, and in 1973 the school’s name was changed to Rehoboth Christian School. Formerly having boarding students, in the 1990s the dormitories were closed and bus transportation was provided for children within a 60-mile radius.

Rehoboth Christian School is listed as one of the 50 Best Christian High Schools in America for 2020 by TheBestSchools.org. Approximately sixty-five percent of the school's students go on to college.

== Campus ==
The entire campus is approximately 162 acres (660,000 m^{2}) in size, with new high school facilities built in 2018. In addition to academic studies, students attend classes in the Bible. Courses in Technology are accommodated by three networked computer labs and a mobile laptop lab with wireless internet access. The school has seven smart-board classrooms, along with mounted projectors in its eight elementary classrooms as well as all high school classrooms. The school's library has 14,000 titles with digital catalog search and magazine subscriptions. There is a Navajo Code Talkers Communication Center.

The Sports and Fitness Center includes a weight room, two full-size basketball courts, turf soccer field and rubberized track. The gymnasium is equipped with a ropes course, and indoor and outdoor climbing walls.

The school includes half of the Calvin-Rehoboth Robotic Observatory, equipped with a Meade Instruments 10’ LX200 telescope with digital camera.

Rehoboth's dormitories, apartments and RV park are available for short and long term volunteers and guests.

== Students ==
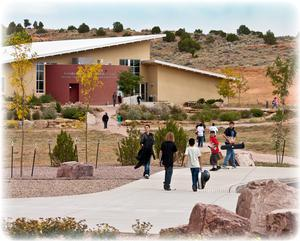
Rehoboth Campus

The Rehoboth Christian School student body consists of 67% Native American students, 23% Anglo students, and 10% of other ethnic minority backgrounds. More than 13 denominations are represented at Rehoboth, including Christian Reformed, Baptists, and Catholic churches. As of the 2011–2012 school year, there were 497 children enrolled in grades PreK-12.

Recent student honors include:

- Chief Manuelito Scholars: (2000, 2002, 2003, 2004, 2005, 2008, 2009, 2011, 2012, 2013, 2014,)
- Daniel’s Scholarship (2010, 2011, 2012, 2013, 2014)
- Gallup Rotary (2010, 2011, 2013, 2014)
- Gates Millennium Scholars (2003, 2004, 2005, 2006, 2008, 2010, 2012, 2013, 2014).

A highlight for middle school students took place in 1999, when 7th and 8th graders participated in an inter-cultural video teleconference with students in Dayton, Ohio. The students presented Navajo crafts and dress to students in the Buckeye State, as well as bragging about the beauty of their New Mexico scenery.

== Faculty ==
The school has 37 full-time teaching staff members and five part-time staff members. Although Rehoboth is no longer a boarding school, as of early 2000s some faculty were still living on campus. The school's Art teacher since 1978, Elmer Yazzie, is noted for painting Biblical scenes using his own brushes handmade from the yucca plant. A Navajo, Yazzie has presented his artistry at workshops in Hanford, California. Another art teacher at the school, Steven E. Heil, is a published author. He wrote a 2001 article, "Traditional Earthen Architecture in the Art Curriculum", for the National Art Education Association's Art Education magazine. In it, he discussed the value of teaching the creative process of architectural design in a school's art curriculum, especially as it relates to local culture. In studying adobe structures in his classes, Heil said, Zuni students learned "something that was theirs ... is valuable and worth preserving".

== Accreditation ==
Rehoboth Christian School is accredited by CSI (Christian Schools International).

== Extracurricular activities ==
21st Century After-School Program: Over 200 students from Rehoboth and nearby Church Rock Elementary attend this federally funded after-school enrichment program, including tutoring and sport programs.

Activities include choir, school band and sports. In 2010, ten students made the All-State choir. The high school choir has toured California, Iowa, Illinois, Michigan, Utah, Colorado, New Mexico, Arizona, Washington, Oregon, Mississippi, Louisiana, and Germany. In 2002, the choir performed in Vancouver (British Columbia, Canada). The high school band toured the Pacific Northwest and California in 2011, and toured Texas, Iowa, Minnesota, and South Dakota in 2013. In 2014, for example, the high school choir of 50 singers presented I Will Rise in Bellingham, Washington, in conjunction with the choir of Lynden Christian School.

- Fall Sports: Boys Soccer; Girls Soccer; Girls Volleyball; Boys Cross Country; Girls Cross Country.
- Winter Sports: Boys Basketball; Girls Basketball.
- Spring Sports: Boys Track & Field; Girls Track & Field; Boys Baseball; Girls Softball; Boys Club Tennis; Girls Club Tennis.
