= Hamilton, Ontario =

City in Ontario, Canada

Hamilton
- City (single-tier)
- City of Hamilton
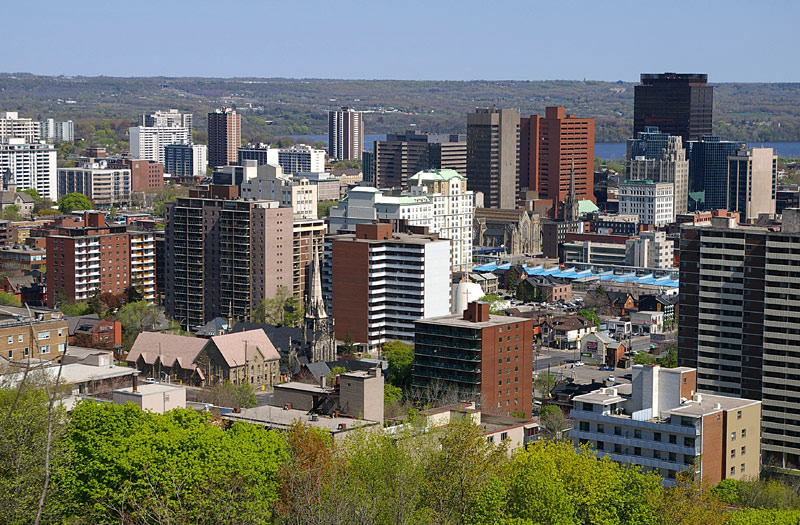
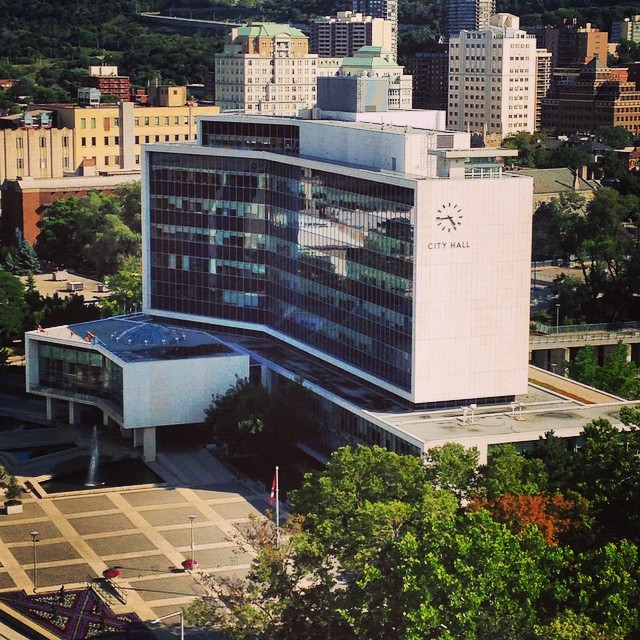
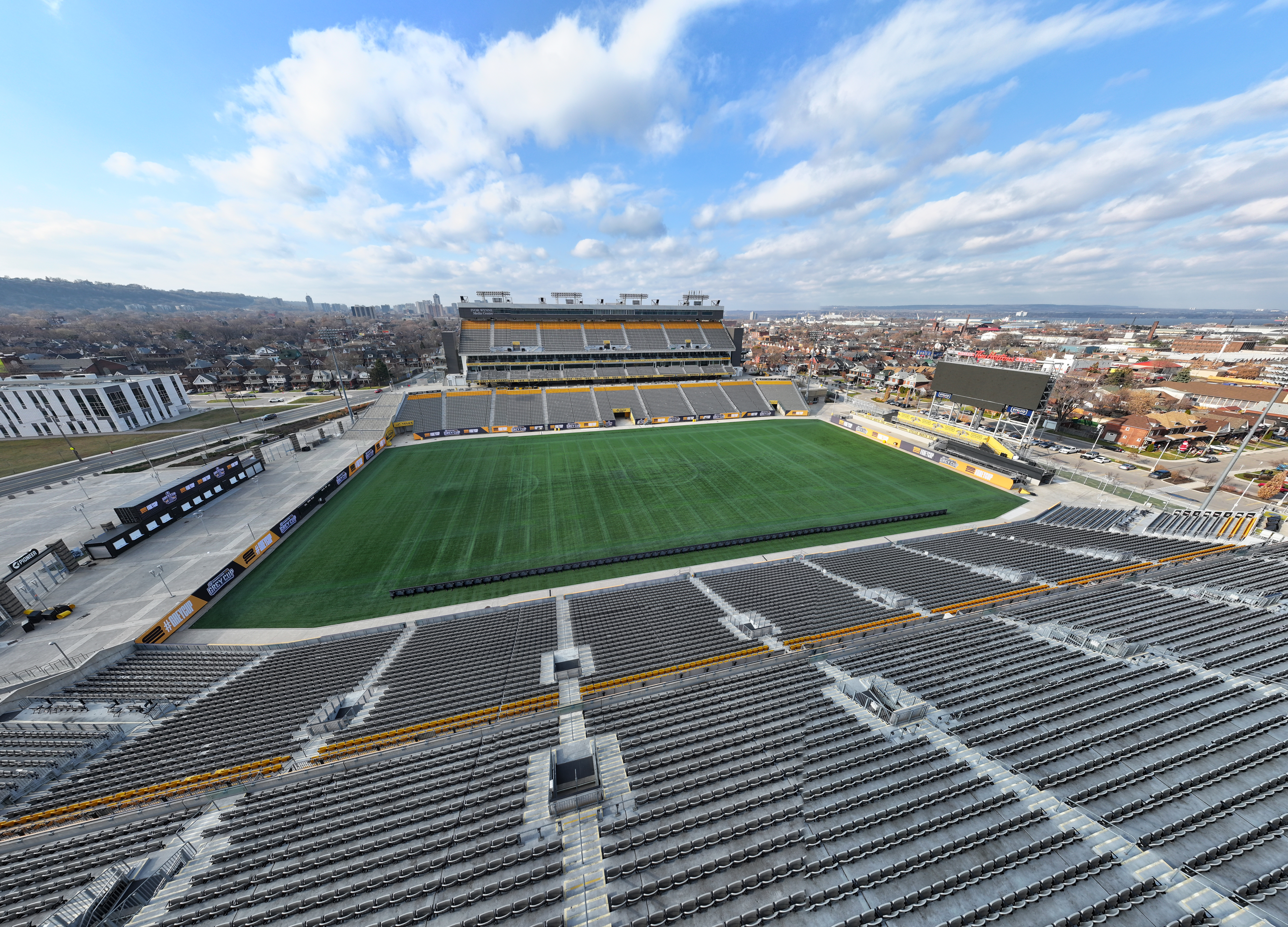
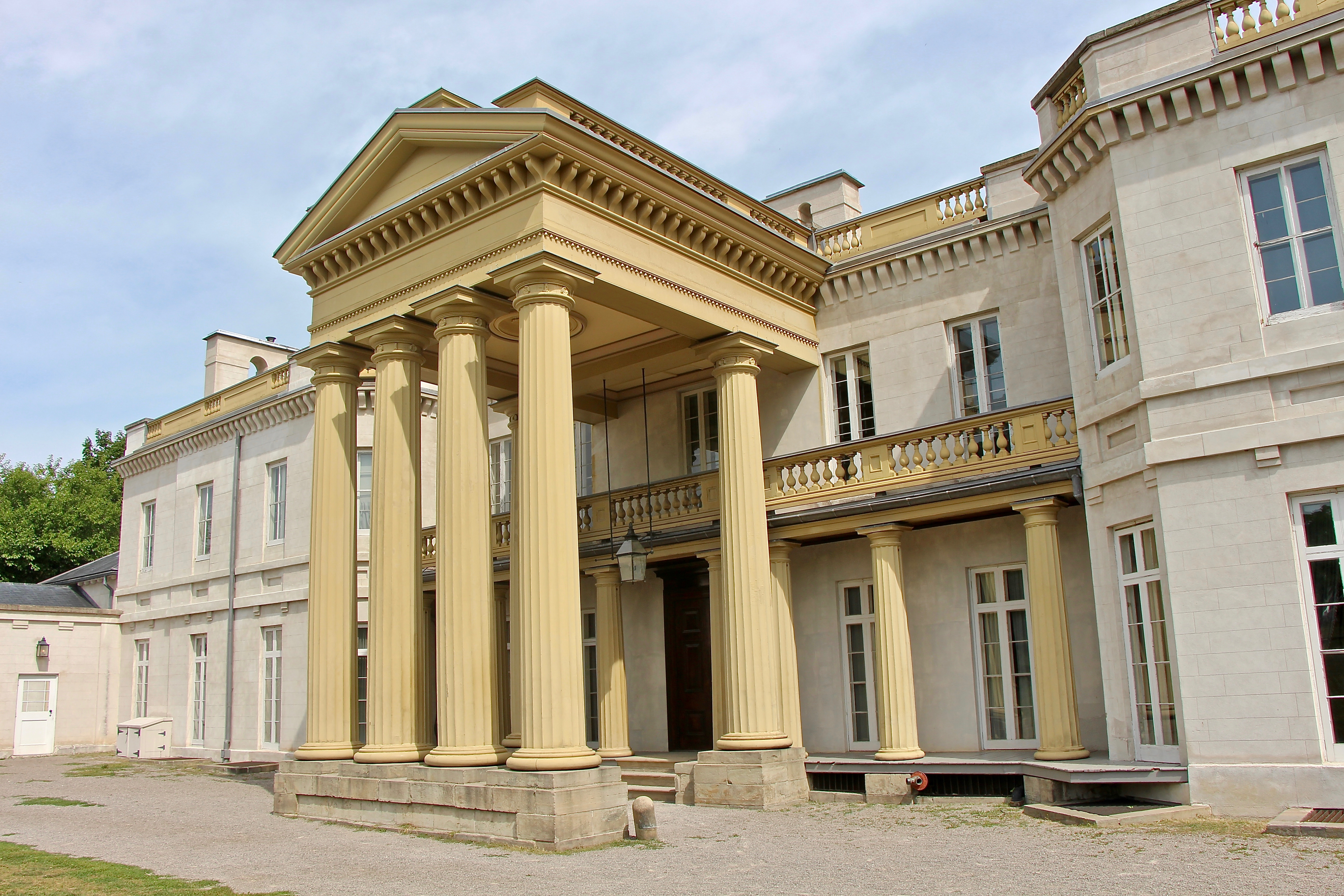
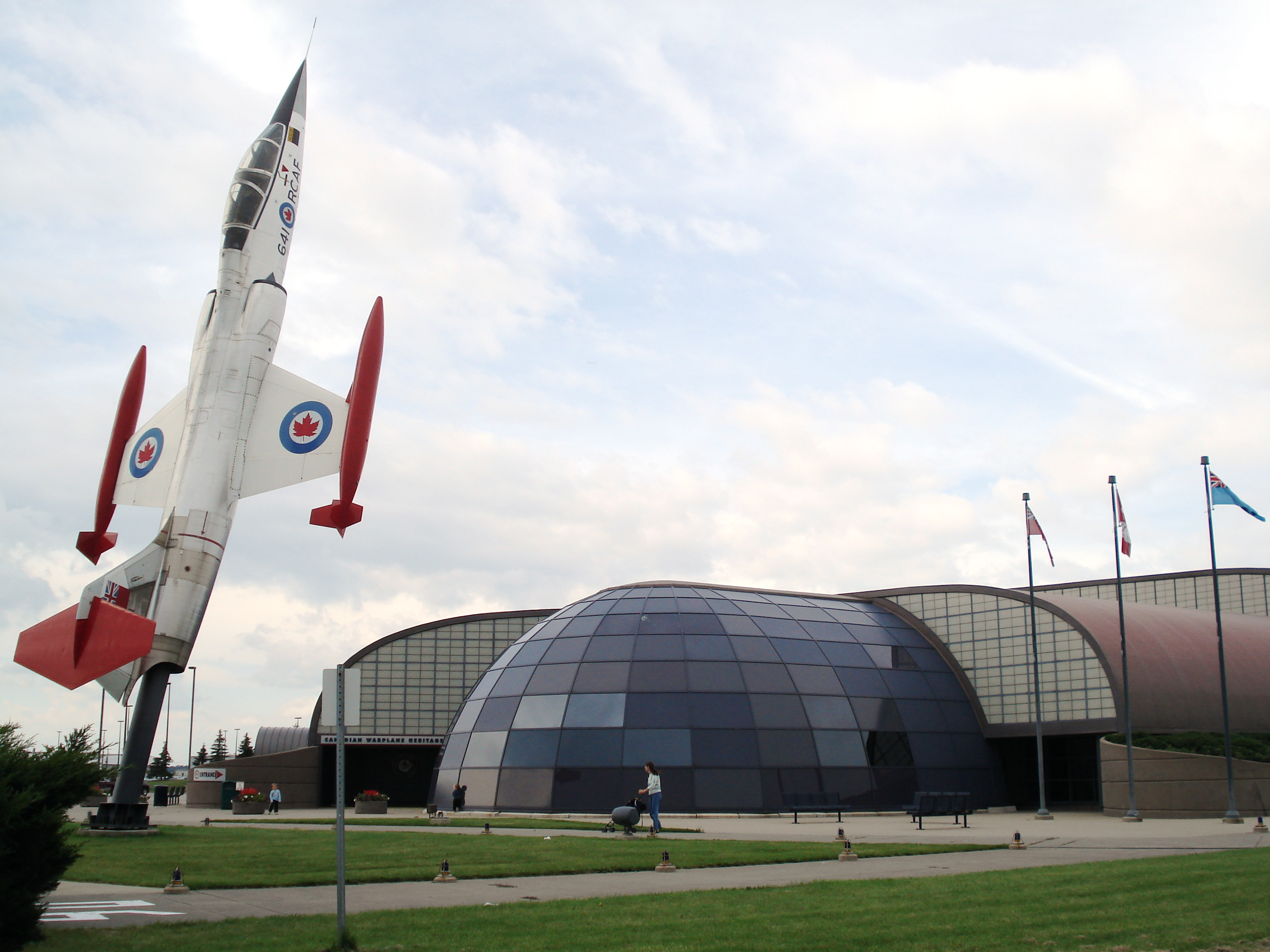
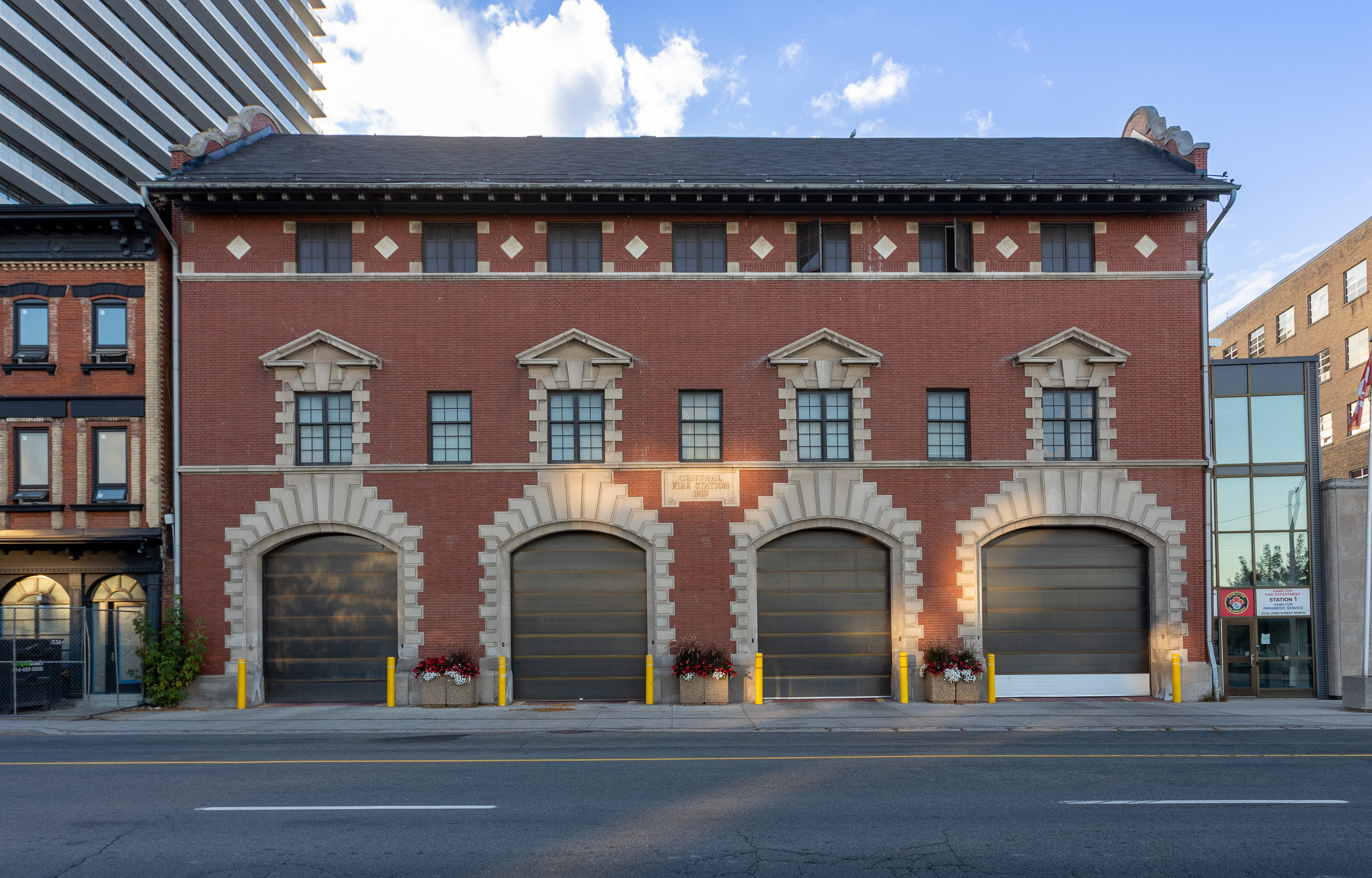
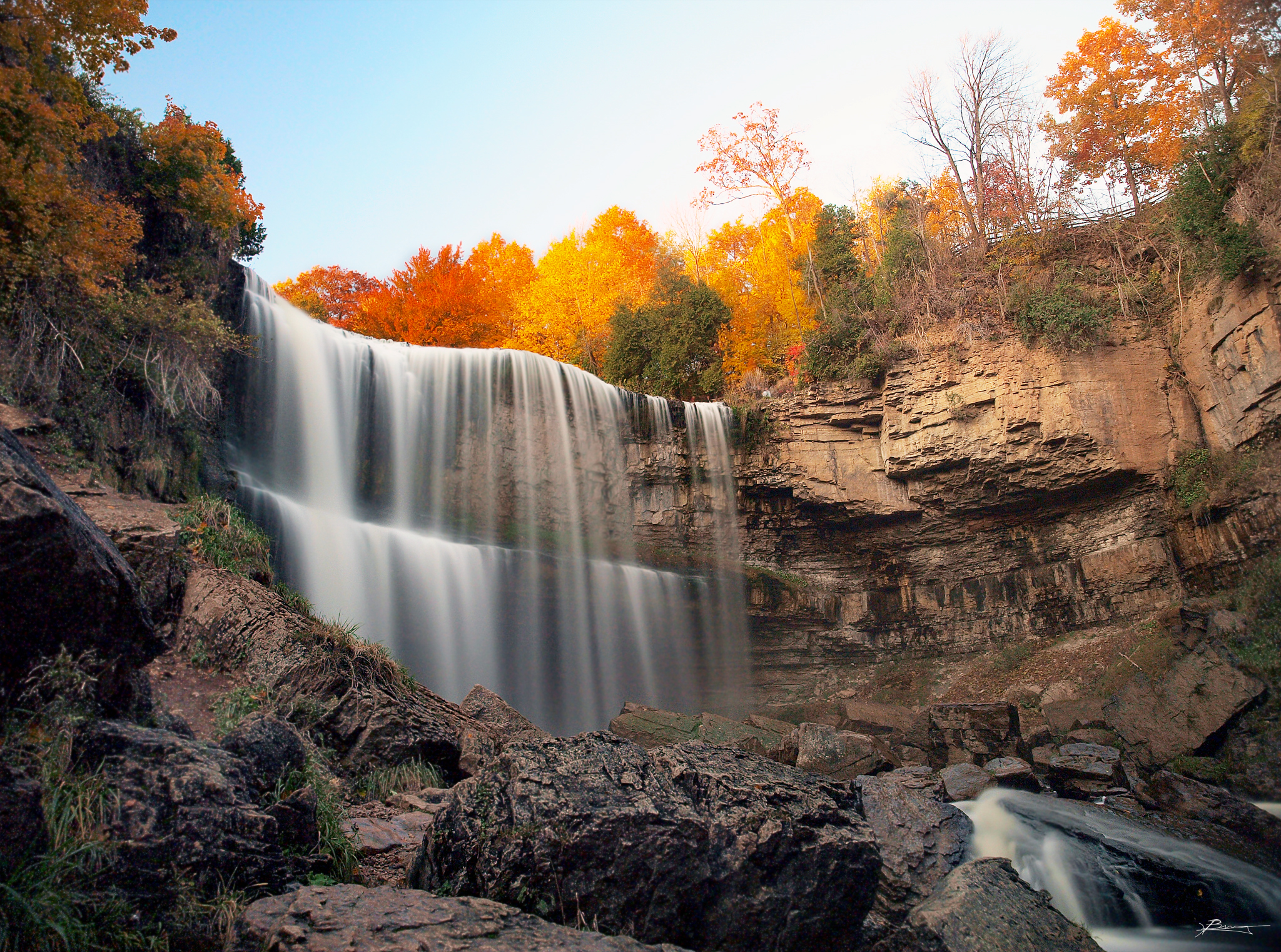
- Skyline of Downtown Hamilton Hamilton City Hall Hamilton Stadium Dundurn Castle Canadian Warplane Heritage Museum Central Fire Station Webster's Falls

- Flag Coat of arms Logo
- Nicknames: "The Ambitious City", "The Electric City", "The Hammer", "Steeltown"
- Motto: English: Together Aspire – Together Achieve
- Major communities

- Location in Southern Ontario Location in Ontario Location in Canada
- Coordinates: 43°14′34″N 79°59′22″W
- Country: Canada
- Province: Ontario
- Region: Southern Ontario
- Incorporated: June 9, 1846; 180 years ago
- Amalgamated: January 1, 2001; 25 years ago
- Named for: George Hamilton

Government
  - Type: Single-tier municipality under a mayor–council system
  - Body: Hamilton City Council
  - Mayor: Keanin Loomis
  - MPs: See below: Ned Kuruc (C); Dan Muys (C); John-Paul Danko (L); Aslam Rana (L); Lisa Hepfner (L)
  - MPPs: See below: Jeff Beattie (PC); Monica Ciriello (PC); Donna Skelly (PC); Robin Lennox (NDP); Sandy Shaw (NDP)

Area
  - City (single-tier): 1,118.31 km^{2} (431.78 sq mi)
  - Urban: 356.03 km^{2} (137.46 sq mi)
  - Metro: 1,373.15 km^{2} (530.18 sq mi)

Population (2021)
  - City (single-tier): 569,353 (10th)
  - Density: 509.1/km^{2} (1,319/sq mi)
  - Urban: 729,560
  - Metro: 785,184 (9th)
- Demonym: Hamiltonian

GDP (Nominal, 2021)
  - Metro: CA$41.17 billion (US$32.94 billion)
  - Per capita: CA$50,343 (US$40,274.4)
- Time zone: UTC−05:00 (EST)
  - Summer (DST): UTC−04:00 (EDT)
- Postal code prefix: L
- Area codes: 905, 289, 365, and 742
- Website: www.hamilton.ca

Hamilton is a port city in the Canadian province of Ontario. Hamilton has a population of 569,353 as of the 2021 Canadian census, and its census metropolitan area, which encompasses Burlington and Grimsby, has a population of 785,184. The city is situated approximately 68 kilometres (42 mi) southwest of Toronto in the Greater Toronto and Hamilton Area (GTHA).

Conceived by George Hamilton when he purchased the Durand farm shortly after the War of 1812, the town of Hamilton became the centre of a densely populated and industrialized region at the west end of Lake Ontario known as the Golden Horseshoe. On January 1, 2001, the current boundaries of Hamilton were created through the amalgamation of the original city with other municipalities of the Regional Municipality of Hamilton–Wentworth. Residents of the city are known as Hamiltonians.

Traditionally, the local economy has been led by the steel and heavy manufacturing industries. During the 2010s, a shift toward service sector industries such as health and sciences occurred. Hamilton is home to the Royal Botanical Gardens, the Canadian Warplane Heritage Museum, and the Bruce Trail, as well as McMaster University, Mohawk College, and Redeemer University.

== History ==
In pre-colonial times, the Neutral First Nation used much of the land. They were gradually driven out by the Five (later Six) Haudenosaunee Nations (Iroquois) who were allied with the British against the Wendat (Huron) and their French allies. The hamlet of Westover was built in an area that was originally a Seneca Haudenosaunee tribal village, Tinawatawa, which was first visited by the French in September 1699.

After the American Revolutionary War, about 10,000 United Empire Loyalists left the United States to settle in Upper Canada, now southern Ontario. In 1792, the Crown purchased the land on which Hamilton now stands from the Mississaugas in Treaty 3, also known as the Between the Lakes Purchase. The Crown granted the Loyalists lands from this purchase to encourage settlement in the region. These new settlers were soon followed by many more Americans, attracted by the availability of inexpensive, arable land. At the same time, large numbers of Haudenosaunee who had allied with Britain arrived from the United States and were settled on reserves west of Lake Ontario as compensation for lands they lost in what was now the United States. During the War of 1812, British regulars and local militia defeated invading American troops at the Battle of Stoney Creek, fought in what is now a park in eastern Hamilton.

The town of Hamilton was conceived by George Hamilton (a son of a Queenston entrepreneur and founder, Robert Hamilton), when he purchased farm holdings of James Durand, the local member of the Legislative Assembly of Upper Canada, shortly after the War of 1812. Nathaniel Hughson, a property owner to the north, cooperated with George Hamilton to prepare a proposal for a courthouse and jail on Hamilton's property. Hamilton offered the land to the crown for the future site. Durand was empowered by Hughson and Hamilton to sell property holdings which later became the site of the town. As he had been instructed, Durand circulated the offers at York during a session of the Legislative Assembly, which established a new Gore District, of which the Hamilton townsite was a member.

Initially, this town was not the most important centre of the Gore District. An early indication of Hamilton's sudden prosperity occurred in 1816 when it was chosen over Ancaster, Ontario to be the new Gore District's administrative centre. Another dramatic economic turnabout for Hamilton occurred in 1832 when a canal was finally cut through the outer sand bar that enabled Hamilton to become a major port. A permanent jail was not constructed until 1832, when a cut-stone design was completed on Prince's Square, one of the two squares created in 1816. Subsequently, the first police board and the town limits were defined by statute on February 13, 1833. Official city status was achieved on June 9, 1846, by an act of Parliament of the Province of Canada.

By 1845, the population was 6,475. In 1846, there were useful roads to many communities as well as stagecoaches and steamboats to Toronto, Queenston, and Niagara. Eleven cargo schooners were owned in Hamilton. Eleven churches were in operation. A reading room provided access to newspapers from other cities and from England and the U.S. In addition to stores of all types, four banks, tradesmen of various types, and sixty-five taverns, industry in the community included three breweries, ten importers of dry goods and groceries, five importers of hardware, two tanneries, three coachmakers, and a marble and a stone works.

As the city grew, several prominent buildings were constructed in the late 19th century, including the Grand Lodge of Canada in 1855, West Flamboro Methodist Church in 1879 (later purchased by Dufferin Masonic Lodge in 1893), a public library in 1890, and the Right House department store in 1893. The first commercial telephone service in Canada, the first telephone exchange in the British Empire, and the second telephone exchange in all of North America were each established in the city between 1877 and 1878. The city had several interurban electric street railways and two inclines, all powered by the Cataract Power Co.

Though suffering through the Hamilton Street Railway strike of 1906, with industrial businesses expanding, Hamilton's population doubled between 1900 and 1914. Two steel manufacturing companies, Stelco and Dofasco, were formed in 1910 and 1912, respectively. Procter & Gamble and the Beech-Nut Packing Company opened manufacturing plants in 1914 and 1922, respectively, their first outside the US. In June and July 1916, the Hamilton machinists' strike, caused by a failure of employers to improve working conditions or pay during a booming World War I economy, disrupted production at many of the largest manufacturers and was the largest dispute in the city's history. Population and economic growth continued until the 1960s. In 1929 the city's first high-rise building, the Pigott Building, was constructed; in 1930 McMaster University moved from Toronto to Hamilton, in 1934 the second Canadian Tire store in Canada opened here; in 1940 the airport was completed; and in 1948, the Studebaker assembly line was constructed. Infrastructure and retail development continued, with the Burlington Bay James N. Allan Skyway opening in 1958, and the first Tim Hortons store in 1964. The last streetcar line was abandoned in 1951, but HSR's service included trolley bus routes from 1950 to 1992.

Since the 1970s, many of the large industries have moved or shut down operations in a restructuring that also affected the United States. In 1997, there was a devastating fire at the Plastimet plastics plant. Approximately 300 firefighters battled the blaze, and many sustained severe chemical burns and inhaled volatile organic compounds when at least 400 tonnes of PVC plastic were consumed in the fire.

On January 1, 2001, the new city of Hamilton was formed from the amalgamation of Hamilton and its five neighbouring municipalities: Ancaster, Dundas, Flamborough, Glanbrook, and Stoney Creek. Before amalgamation, the "old" City of Hamilton had 331,121 residents and was divided into 100 neighbourhoods. The former region of Hamilton-Wentworth had a population of 490,268. The amalgamation created a single-tier municipal government ending subsidization of its suburbs. The new amalgamated city had 519,949 people in more than 100 neighbourhoods, and surrounding communities.

The city was impacted by a widespread blackout in 2003 and a tornado in 2005. In 2007, the Red Hill Valley Parkway opened after extensive delays. The Stelco mills were idled in 2010 and permanently closed in 2013. This closure capped a significant shift in the city's economy: the percentage of the population employed in manufacturing declined from 22 to 12 percent between 2003 and 2013.

== Geography ==
Hamilton is in Southern Ontario on the western end of the Niagara Peninsula and wraps around the westernmost part of Lake Ontario; most of the city, including the downtown section, is on the south shore. Hamilton is in the geographic centre of the Golden Horseshoe. Its major physical features are Hamilton Harbour, marking the northern limit of the city, and the Niagara Escarpment running through the middle of the city across its entire breadth, bisecting the city into "upper" and "lower" parts. The maximum high point is 250m (820') above the level of Lake Ontario.

According to all records from local historians, this district was called Attiwandaronia by the native Neutral people. Hamilton is one of 11 cities showcased in the book, Green City: People, Nature & Urban Places by Quebec author Mary Soderstrom, which examines the city as an example of an industrial powerhouse co-existing with nature. Soderstrom credits Thomas McQuesten and family in the 1930s who "became champions of parks, greenspace and roads" in Hamilton.

Hamilton Harbour is a natural harbour with a large sandbar called the Beachstrip. This sandbar was deposited during a period of higher lake levels during the last ice age and extends southeast through the central lower city to the escarpment. Hamilton's deep sea port is accessed by ship canal through the beach strip into the harbour and is traversed by two bridges, the QEW's Burlington Bay James N. Allan Skyway and the lower Canal Lift Bridge.

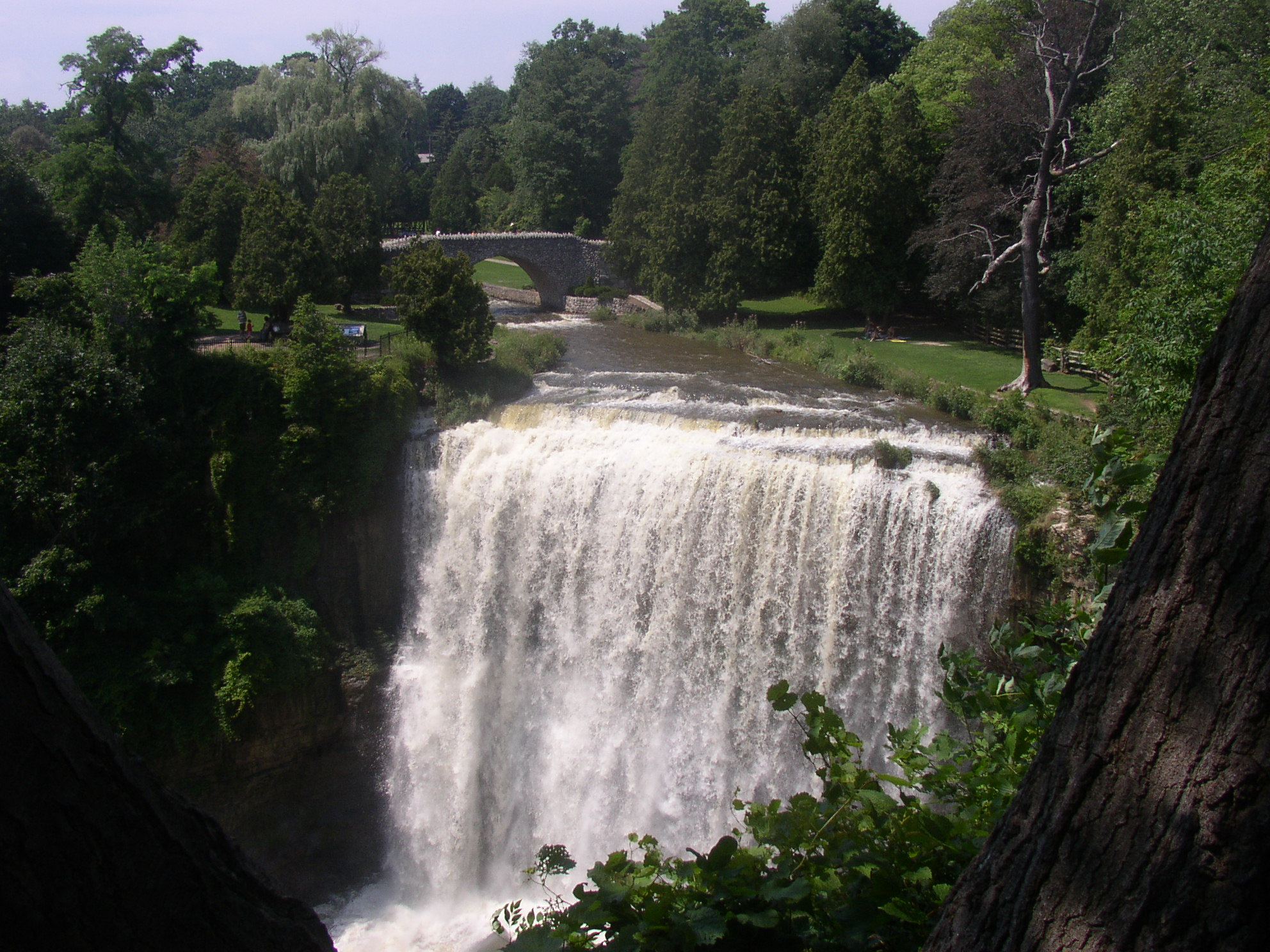
Webster's Falls at Spencer Gorge Conservation Area. There are more than 100 waterfalls in the city.

Between 1788 and 1793, the townships at the Head-of-the-Lake were surveyed and named. The area was first known as The Head-of-the-Lake for its location at the western end of Lake Ontario. John Ryckman, born in Barton township (where present day downtown Hamilton is), described the area in 1803 as he remembered it: "The city in 1803 was all forest. The shores of the bay were difficult to reach or see because they were hidden by a thick, almost impenetrable mass of trees and undergrowth".

George Hamilton, a settler and local politician, established a town site in the northern portion of Barton Township in 1815. He kept several east–west roads which were originally Indian trails, but the north–south streets were on a regular grid pattern. Streets were designated "East" or "West" if they crossed James Street or Highway 6. Streets were designated "North" or "South" if they crossed King Street or Highway 8. The townsite's design, likely conceived in 1816, was commonplace. George Hamilton employed a grid street pattern used in most towns in Upper Canada and throughout the American frontier. The eighty original lots had frontages of fifty feet; each lot faced a broad street and backed onto a twelve-foot lane. It took at least a decade to sell all the original lots, but the construction of the Burlington Canal in 1823, and a new court-house in 1827 encouraged Hamilton to add more blocks around 1828–9. At this time he included a market square in an effort to draw commercial activity onto his lands, but the town's natural growth occurred to the north of Hamilton's plot.

The Hamilton Conservation Authority owns, leases or manages about 4,500 hectares (11,100 acres) of land with the city operating 1,077 hectares (2,661 acres) of parkland at 310 locations. Many of the parks are along the Niagara Escarpment, which runs from Tobermory at the tip of the Bruce Peninsula in the north, to Queenston at the Niagara River in the south, and provides views of the cities and towns at Lake Ontario's western end. The hiking path Bruce Trail runs the length of the escarpment. Hamilton is home to more than 100 waterfalls and cascades, most of which are on or near the Bruce Trail as it winds through the Niagara Escarpment. Visitors can often be seen swimming in the waterfalls during the summertime, although it is strongly recommended to stay away from the water: much of the watershed of the Chedoke and Red Hill creeks originates in storm sewers running beneath neighbourhoods atop the Niagara escarpment, and water quality in many of Hamilton's waterfalls is seriously degraded. High e. coli counts are regularly observed through testing by McMaster University near many of Hamilton's waterfalls, sometimes exceeding the provincial limits for recreational water use by as much as 400 times. The storm sewers in upstream neighbourhoods carry polluted runoff from streets and parking lots, as well as occasional raw sewage from sanitary lines that were improperly connected to the storm sewers instead of the separate sanitary sewer system. Notably, in March 2020, it was revealed that as much as 24 billion litres of untreated wastewater has been leaking into the Chedoke creek and Cootes' Paradise areas since at least 2014 due to insufficiencies in the city's sewerage and storm water management systems.

=== Climate ===
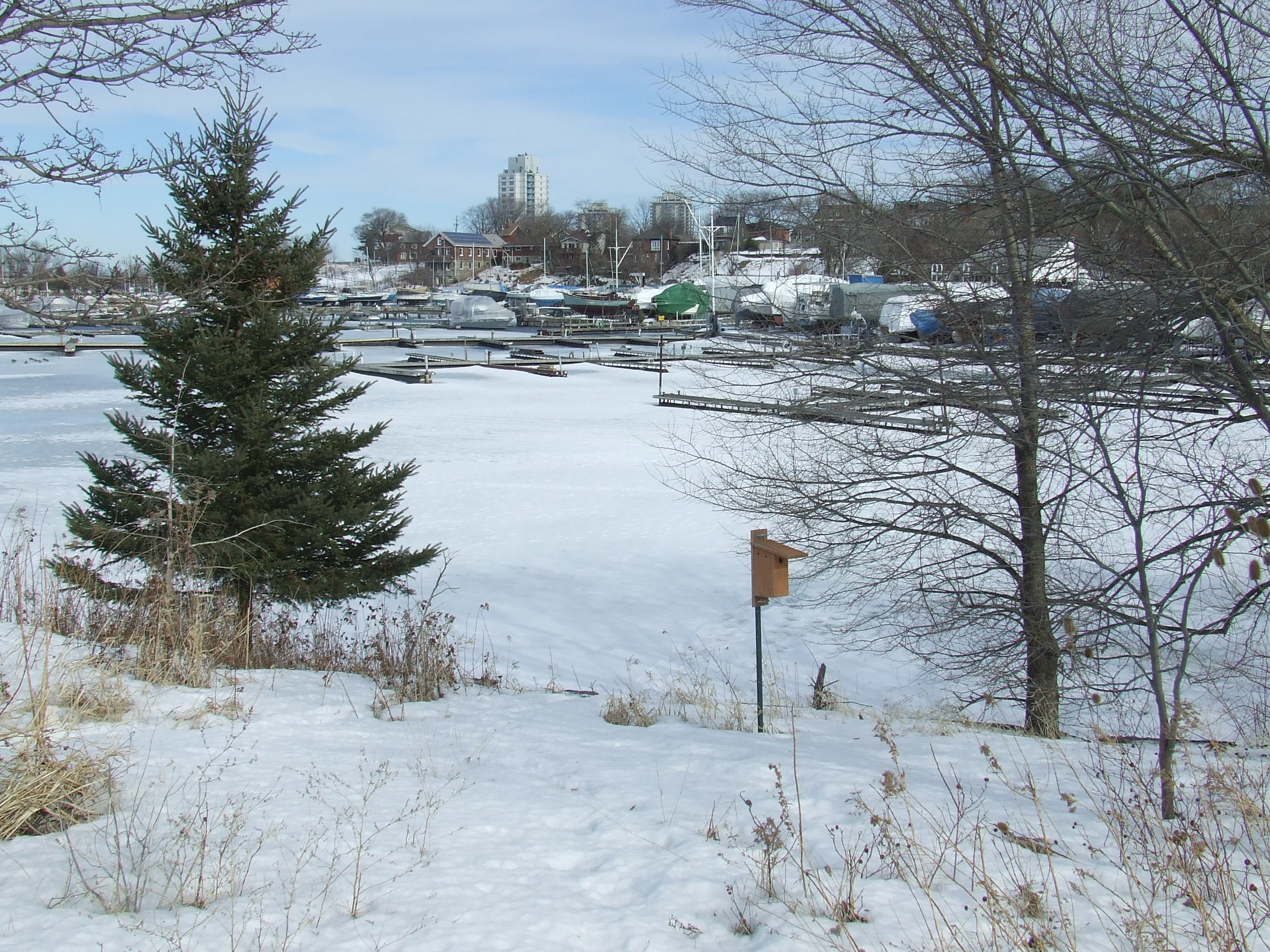
Hamilton Harbour during the winter.

Hamilton's climate is humid-continental, characterized by changeable weather patterns. In the Köppen classification, Hamilton is on the Dfb/Dfa boundary, found in southern Ontario because the average temperature in July is 22.0 °C (71.6 °F). However, its climate is moderate compared with most of Canada. The airport's open, rural location and higher altitude results in lower temperatures, generally windier conditions, and higher snowfall amounts than lower, built-up areas of the city. The highest temperature ever recorded in Hamilton was 41.1 °C (106 °F) on July 14, 1868. The coldest temperature ever recorded was −30.6 °C (−23 °F) on January 25, 1884. In 2023, it was found that the city has areas of poor air quality with a high concentration of benzo(a)pyrene, particularly in neighbourhoods near industrial sites.

The record high daily minimum temperature at Hamilton Airport was 25.1 °C (77.2 °F) on August 1, 2006. The record high dew point was 27.7 °C (81.9 °F) on July 14, 1995. The most humid month was August 2021 with a monthly average dew point of 18.3 °C (64.9 °F). The warmest month was July 1988 with a monthly average mean temperature of 24.8 °C (76.6 °F). The month with the warmest average daily maximums was July 2011 with an average monthly daily maximum of 29.8 °C (85.6 °F). The month with the warmest average daily minimums was July 2020 with an average monthly daily maximum of 17.4 °C (63.3 °F), with no daily minimum temperature below 12.9 °C (55.2 °F) during the entire month. July 2011 recorded no daily maximum temperature below 26.0 °C (78.8 °F) during the entire month. July 2023 recorded no dew point below 9.9 °C (49.8 °F) throughout the month.

Summer 2000 recorded the lowest yearly maximum temperature of 29.8 °C (85.6 °F). Summer 2017 recorded the lowest yearly maximum daily minimum temperature of 19.1 °C (66.4 °F). Summer 2007 recorded the lowest yearly maximum dew point of 22.1 °C (71.8 °F) at Hamilton Airport.

At Hamilton Airport, the average yearly maximum dew point is 24.3 °C (75.7 °F), and the average yearly maximum daily minimum temperature is 21.6 °C (70.9 °F).

Hamilton International Airport

Climate chart (precipitation, max. and min. temperature)
J	F	M	A	M	J	J	A	S	O	N	D
73 −1 −9	53 −1 −9	69 5 −4	81 12 1	81 19 7	78 24 13	98 27 15	67 26 15	74 22 11	84 15 5	78 8 0	67 2 −5
- █ Average max. and min. temperatures in °C
- █ Precipitation totals in mm
- Source: Environment Canada
Imperial conversion
J	F	M	A	M	J	J	A	S	O	N	D
2.9 29 16	2.1 30 15	2.7 40 24	3.2 53 34	3.2 66 45	3.1 76 55	3.8 80 59	2.6 78 58	2.9 71 51	3.3 58 41	3.1 46 32	2.6 35 22
- █ Average max. and min. temperatures in °F
- █ Precipitation totals in inches

Climate data for Hamilton (John C. Munro Hamilton International Airport) WMO ID: 71263; coordinates: 43°10′18″N 79°56′03″W; elevation: 237.7 m (780 ft); 1991−2020 normals, extremes 1959–present
Month	Jan	Feb	Mar	Apr	May	Jun	Jul	Aug	Sep	Oct	Nov	Dec	Year
Record high humidex	17.6	18.5	27.7	33.4	40.5	44.4	49.1	47.6	42.1	37.7	26.6	24.5	49.1
Record high °C (°F)	16.7 (62.1)	17.9 (64.2)	26.8 (80.2)	29.7 (85.5)	33.1 (91.6)	35.0 (95.0)	37.4 (99.3)	36.4 (97.5)	34.4 (93.9)	30.3 (86.5)	24.4 (75.9)	20.7 (69.3)	37.4 (99.3)
Mean maximum °C (°F)	10.4 (50.7)	9.5 (49.1)	16.9 (62.4)	23.7 (74.7)	28.9 (84.0)	31.5 (88.7)	32.2 (90.0)	31.1 (88.0)	29.9 (85.8)	24.6 (76.3)	17.5 (63.5)	11.7 (53.1)	33.3 (91.9)
Mean daily maximum °C (°F)	−1.4 (29.5)	−0.9 (30.4)	4.7 (40.5)	11.8 (53.2)	18.9 (66.0)	24.2 (75.6)	26.6 (79.9)	25.6 (78.1)	21.7 (71.1)	14.5 (58.1)	7.7 (45.9)	1.5 (34.7)	12.9 (55.2)
Daily mean °C (°F)	−5.3 (22.5)	−5 (23)	0.2 (32.4)	6.5 (43.7)	13.1 (55.6)	18.5 (65.3)	20.9 (69.6)	20.1 (68.2)	16.1 (61.0)	9.7 (49.5)	3.8 (38.8)	−1.9 (28.6)	8.1 (46.6)
Mean daily minimum °C (°F)	−9.1 (15.6)	−9.2 (15.4)	−4.4 (24.1)	1.3 (34.3)	7.3 (45.1)	12.8 (55.0)	15.2 (59.4)	14.5 (58.1)	10.5 (50.9)	4.8 (40.6)	−0.2 (31.6)	−5.4 (22.3)	3.2 (37.8)
Mean minimum °C (°F)	−20.2 (−4.4)	−19.5 (−3.1)	−14.8 (5.4)	−5.7 (21.7)	0.4 (32.7)	5.8 (42.4)	9.3 (48.7)	8.6 (47.5)	3.0 (37.4)	−2.8 (27.0)	−8.4 (16.9)	−15.1 (4.8)	−22.4 (−8.3)
Record low °C (°F)	−30.0 (−22.0)	−29.1 (−20.4)	−24.6 (−12.3)	−12.8 (9.0)	−3.9 (25.0)	1.1 (34.0)	5.6 (42.1)	1.1 (34.0)	−2.2 (28.0)	−7.8 (18.0)	−19.3 (−2.7)	−26.8 (−16.2)	−30.0 (−22.0)
Record low wind chill	−43.0	−37.0	−30.7	−22.5	−8.0	0.0	0.0	0.0	−4.6	−10.9	−22.8	−33.9	−43.0
Average precipitation mm (inches)	72.9 (2.87)	53.4 (2.10)	68.7 (2.70)	81.3 (3.20)	81.0 (3.19)	77.6 (3.06)	97.5 (3.84)	66.8 (2.63)	73.5 (2.89)	84.2 (3.31)	78.1 (3.07)	67.3 (2.65)	902.3 (35.52)
Average rainfall mm (inches)	36.4 (1.43)	24.5 (0.96)	43.9 (1.73)	73.0 (2.87)	81.0 (3.19)	78.1 (3.07)	97.5 (3.84)	65.5 (2.58)	73.6 (2.90)	83.2 (3.28)	67.7 (2.67)	40.2 (1.58)	764.6 (30.10)
Average snowfall cm (inches)	40.8 (16.1)	35.1 (13.8)	26.5 (10.4)	8.4 (3.3)	0.5 (0.2)	0.0 (0.0)	0.0 (0.0)	0.0 (0.0)	0.0 (0.0)	0.7 (0.3)	11.0 (4.3)	33.5 (13.2)	156.5 (61.6)
Average precipitation days (≥ 0.2 mm)	17.1	13.6	12.9	12.6	12.8	10.7	11.5	10.2	9.8	12.4	13.5	15.4	152.4
Average rainy days (≥ 0.2 mm)	5.9	4.1	7.5	11.4	12.8	10.6	11.5	10.1	9.8	12.3	10.4	7.9	114.2
Average snowy days (≥ 0.2 cm)	14.5	11.6	8.1	2.7	0.10	0.0	0.0	0.0	0.0	0.43	4.8	12.0	54.2
Average relative humidity (%) (at 15:00)	75.1	70.7	65.1	59.6	57.1	57.7	57.5	60.5	61.3	65.3	71.5	75.6	64.8
Average dew point °C (°F)	−7.9 (17.8)	−7.7 (18.1)	−4.2 (24.4)	0.7 (33.3)	7.4 (45.3)	13.1 (55.6)	15.8 (60.4)	15.7 (60.3)	12.2 (54.0)	6.2 (43.2)	0.5 (32.9)	−4.3 (24.3)	4.0 (39.2)
Source 1: Environment and Climate Change Canada (snowfall 1981–2010)
Source 2: weatherstats.ca (for dewpoint and monthly&yearly average absolute maximum&minimum temperature)

Climate data for Hamilton, Ontario (Royal Botanical Gardens) Climate ID: 6153300; coordinates 43°17′N 79°53′W; elevation: 102.10 m (335.0 ft); 1981−2010 normals, extremes 1866−present (Note: Based on station coordinates provided by Environment and Climate Change Canada, climate data for was recorded near downtown Hamilton from January 1866 to August 1958, and April 1950 to present at the Royal Botanical Gardens.)
Month	Jan	Feb	Mar	Apr	May	Jun	Jul	Aug	Sep	Oct	Nov	Dec	Year
Record high °C (°F)	18.3 (64.9)	18.8 (65.8)	27.2 (81.0)	31.1 (88.0)	36.1 (97.0)	38.9 (102.0)	41.1 (106.0)	38.9 (102.0)	37.8 (100.0)	32.2 (90.0)	26.1 (79.0)	21.2 (70.2)	41.1 (106.0)
Mean daily maximum °C (°F)	−0.9 (30.4)	0.1 (32.2)	4.8 (40.6)	11.7 (53.1)	18.6 (65.5)	24.3 (75.7)	27.3 (81.1)	25.9 (78.6)	21.1 (70.0)	14.6 (58.3)	7.7 (45.9)	2.0 (35.6)	13.1 (55.6)
Daily mean °C (°F)	−4.7 (23.5)	−3.9 (25.0)	0.5 (32.9)	7.1 (44.8)	13.3 (55.9)	18.9 (66.0)	22.0 (71.6)	20.9 (69.6)	16.3 (61.3)	10.0 (50.0)	4.1 (39.4)	−1.4 (29.5)	8.6 (47.5)
Mean daily minimum °C (°F)	−8.5 (16.7)	−7.9 (17.8)	−3.8 (25.2)	2.4 (36.3)	7.9 (46.2)	13.4 (56.1)	16.7 (62.1)	15.8 (60.4)	11.4 (52.5)	5.4 (41.7)	0.4 (32.7)	−4.7 (23.5)	4.0 (39.2)
Record low °C (°F)	−30.6 (−23.1)	−29.4 (−20.9)	−28.3 (−18.9)	−14.4 (6.1)	−7.2 (19.0)	−1.1 (30.0)	5.0 (41.0)	1.1 (34.0)	−3.9 (25.0)	−11.1 (12.0)	−22.8 (−9.0)	−27.8 (−18.0)	−30.6 (−23.1)
Average precipitation mm (inches)	56.8 (2.24)	57.2 (2.25)	63.7 (2.51)	73.3 (2.89)	85.5 (3.37)	72.7 (2.86)	82.7 (3.26)	89.7 (3.53)	80.9 (3.19)	71.6 (2.82)	91.3 (3.59)	71.9 (2.83)	897.1 (35.32)
Average rainfall mm (inches)	27.4 (1.08)	26.4 (1.04)	43.3 (1.70)	70.1 (2.76)	85.5 (3.37)	72.7 (2.86)	82.7 (3.26)	89.7 (3.53)	80.9 (3.19)	71.6 (2.82)	83.2 (3.28)	46.8 (1.84)	780.0 (30.71)
Average snowfall cm (inches)	32.4 (12.8)	31.1 (12.2)	18.3 (7.2)	2.8 (1.1)	0.0 (0.0)	0.0 (0.0)	0.0 (0.0)	0.0 (0.0)	0.0 (0.0)	0.0 (0.0)	7.5 (3.0)	26.0 (10.2)	118.1 (46.5)
Average precipitation days (≥ 0.2 mm)	14.7	12.1	12.3	13.5	12.2	10.5	10.7	11.1	12.3	11.8	14.3	13.8	149.1
Average rainy days (≥ 0.2 mm)	5.7	5.0	8.8	12.6	12.2	10.5	10.7	11.1	12.3	11.8	12.8	7.6	120.9
Average snowy days (≥ 0.2 cm)	10.5	8.6	4.9	1.2	0.0	0.0	0.0	0.0	0.0	0.0	2.6	8.4	36.2
Mean monthly sunshine hours	87.2	113.4	152.4	182.2	244.0	279.1	303.5	262.6	177.7	148.6	88.9	71.0	2,110.6
Percentage possible sunshine	30.0	38.3	41.3	45.4	53.7	60.7	65.1	60.7	47.3	43.4	30.4	25.3	45.1
Average ultraviolet index	1	2	4	5	7	8	8	7	6	3	2	1	5
Source 1: Environment and Climate Change Canada
Source 2: Weather Atlas

== Economy ==
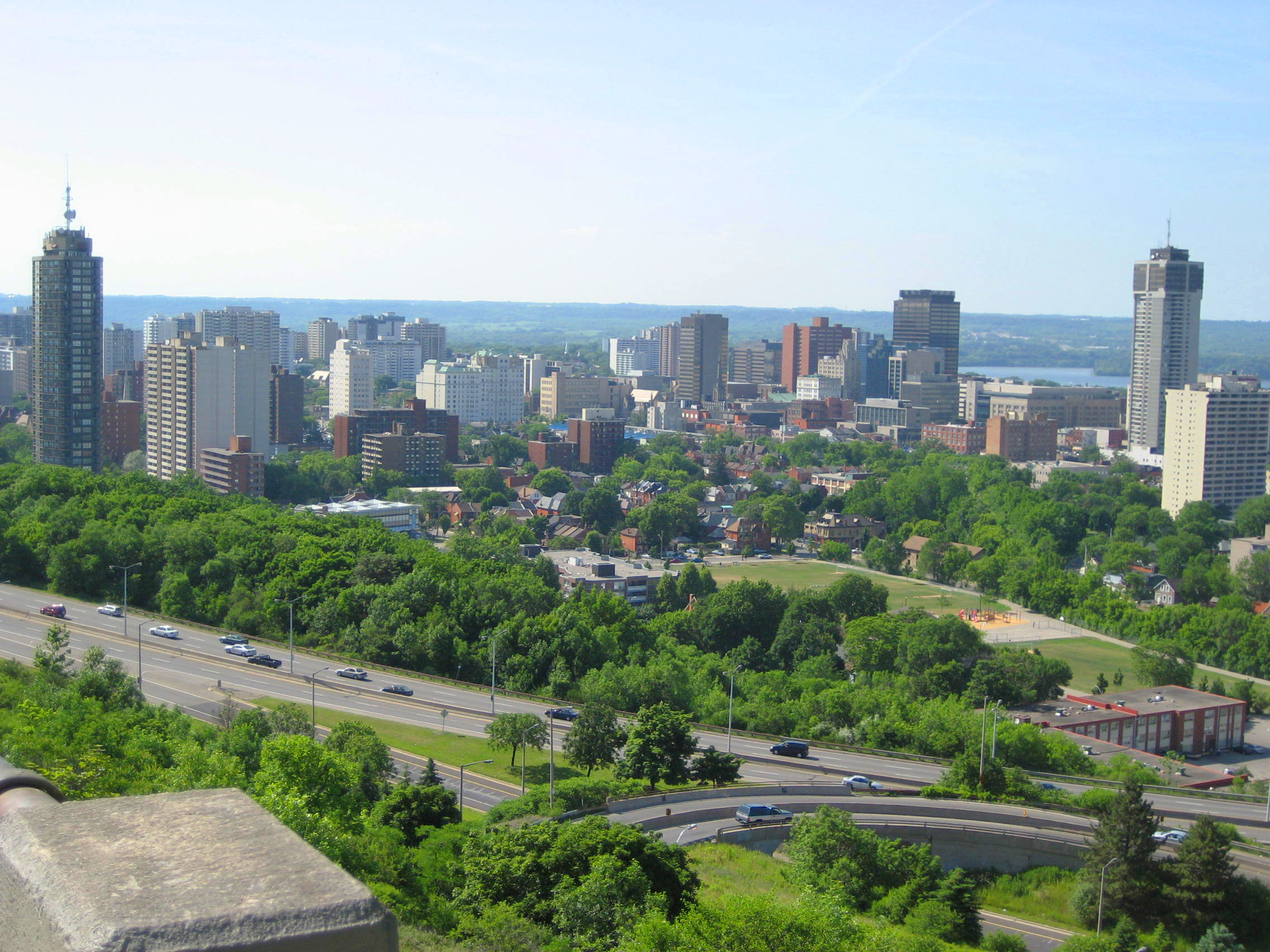
View of Downtown Hamilton from atop the Niagara Escarpment.

Manufacturing is important to Ontario's economy, and the Toronto–Hamilton region is Canada's most industrialized area. The area from Oshawa, Ontario around the west end of Lake Ontario to Niagara Falls, with Hamilton at its centre, is known as the Golden Horseshoe and had a population of approximately 8.1 million people in 2006.

With sixty percent of Canada's steel produced in Hamilton by Stelco and Dofasco, the city has become known as the Steel Capital of Canada. After nearly declaring bankruptcy, Stelco returned to profitability in 2004. On August 26, 2007 United States Steel Corporation acquired Stelco for C$38.50 in cash per share, owning more than 76 percent of Stelco's outstanding shares. On September 17, 2014, US Steel Canada announced it was applying for bankruptcy protection and it would close its Hamilton operations.

A stand-alone subsidiary of ArcelorMittal, the world's largest steel producer, Dofasco produces products for the automotive, construction, energy, manufacturing, pipe and tube, appliance, packaging, and steel distribution industries. It has approximately 7,300 employees at its Hamilton plant, and the four million tons of steel it produces each year is about 30% of Canada's flat-rolled sheet steel shipments. Dofasco was North America's most profitable steel producer in 1999, the most profitable in Canada in 2000, and a long-time member of the Dow Jones Sustainability World Index. Ordered by the U.S. Department of Justice to divest itself of the Canadian company, ArcelorMittal has been allowed to retain Dofasco provided it sells several of its American assets.

== Demographics ==
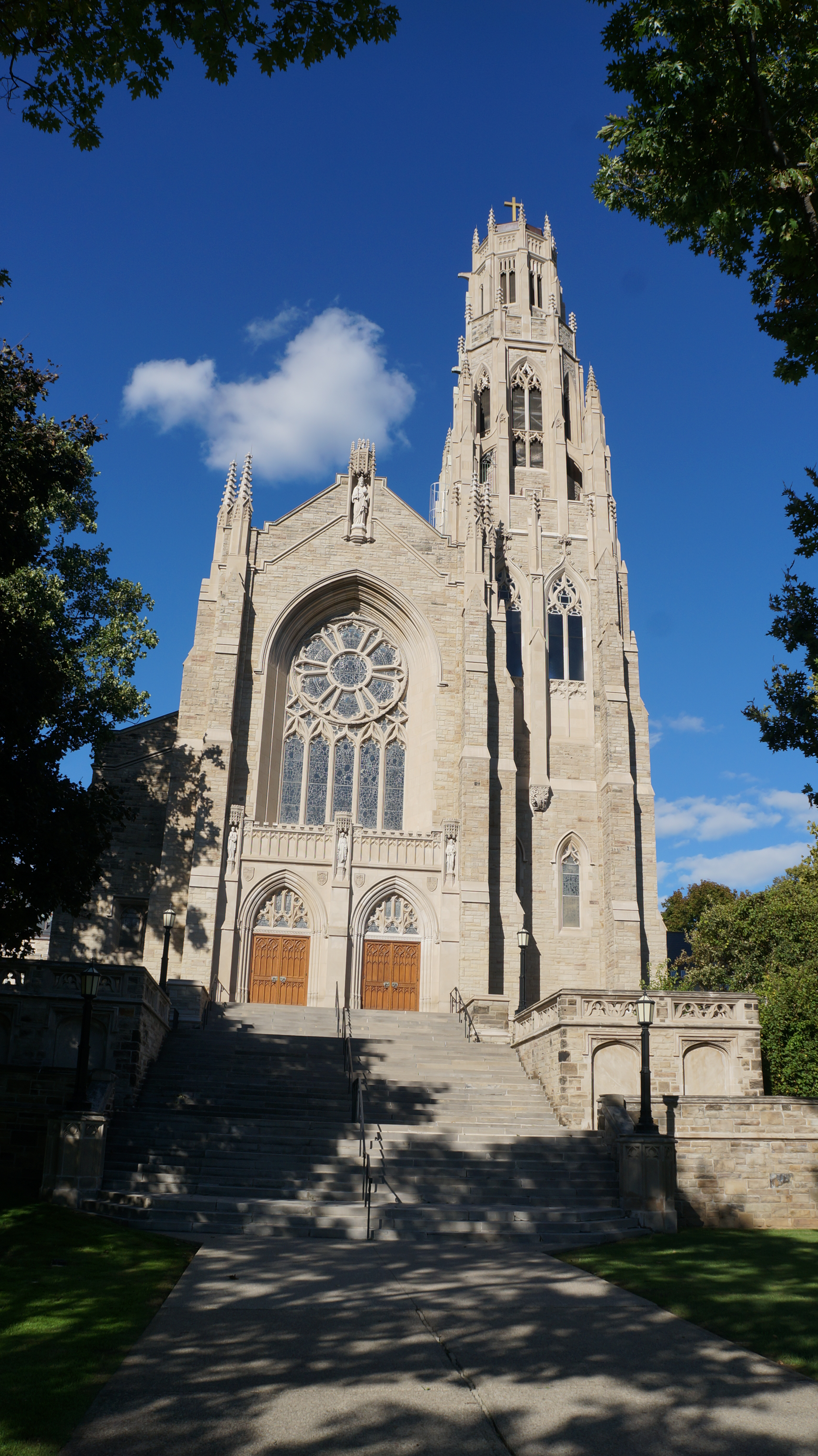
Cathedral Basilica of Christ the King is the seat for the Roman Catholic Diocese of Hamilton. Catholicism is the largest religious denomination in the city.

Historical populations
Year	Pop.	±%
1871	26,716	—
1881	35,961	+34.6%
1891	47,245	+31.4%
1901	52,634	+11.4%
1911	81,969	+55.7%
1921	114,151	+39.3%
1931	155,547	+36.3%
1941	166,337	+6.9%
1951	208,321	+25.2%
1956	239,625	+15.0%
1961	273,991	+14.3%
1966	298,121	+8.8%
1971	309,173	+3.7%
1976	312,003	+0.9%
1981	306,434	−1.8%
1986	306,728	+0.1%
1991	318,499	+3.8%
1996	322,352	+1.2%
2001	490,268	+52.1%
2006	504,559	+2.9%
2011	519,949	+3.1%
2016	536,917	+3.3%
2021	569,353	+6.0%

In the 2021 Census of Population conducted by Statistics Canada, Hamilton had a population of 569,353 living in 222,807 of its 233,564 total private dwellings, a change of 6% from its 2016 population of 536,917. With a land area of 1,118.31 km^{2} (431.78 sq mi), it had a population density of 509.1/km^{2} (1,318.6/sq mi) in 2021.

At the census metropolitan area (CMA) level in the 2021 census, the Hamilton CMA had a population of 785,184 living in 307,382 of its 320,081 total private dwellings, a change of 5% from its 2016 population of 747,545. With a land area of 1,373.15 km^{2} (530.18 sq mi), it had a population density of 571.8/km^{2} (1,481.0/sq mi) in 2021.

In the 2016 Canadian census, 24.69% of the city's population was not born in Canada. Hamilton is home to 26,330 immigrants who arrived in Canada between 2001 and 2010 and 13,150 immigrants who arrived between 2011 and 2016. In February 2014, the city's council voted to declare Hamilton a sanctuary city, offering municipal services to undocumented immigrants at risk of deportation.

Children aged 14 years and under accounted for 16.23% of the city's population, a decline of 1.57% from the 2011 census. Hamiltonians aged 65 years and older constituted 17.3% of the population, an increase of 2.4% since 2011. The city's average age is 41.3 years. 54.9% of Hamiltonians are married or in a common-law relationship, while 6.4% of city residents are divorced. Same-sex couples (married or in common-law relationships) constitute 0.8% (2,710 individuals) of the partnered population in Hamilton.

Environics Analytics, a geodemographic marketing firm that created 66 different "clusters" of people complete with profiles of how they live, what they think and what they consume, sees a future Hamilton with younger upscale Hamiltonians — who are tech-savvy and university-educated — choosing to live in the downtown and surrounding areas rather than just visiting intermittently. More two and three-storey townhouses and apartments will be built on downtown lots; small condos will be built on vacant spaces in areas such as Dundas, Ainslie Wood and Westdale to accommodate newly retired seniors. Furthermore, additional retail and commercial zones will be created.

=== Ethnicity ===
Largest ethnic origin in Hamilton CMA by census tract based on the 2021 census

Hamilton maintains significant Italian, English, Scottish, German and Irish ancestry. 130,705 Hamiltonians claim English heritage, while 98,765 indicate their ancestors arrived from Scotland, 87,825 from Ireland, 62,335 from Italy, and 50,400 from Germany. The top countries of birth for the newcomers living in Hamilton in the 1990s were: former Yugoslavia, Poland, India, China, the Philippines, and Iraq.

Largest non-European panethnic group in Hamilton CMA by census tract based on the 2021 census

Panethnic groups in the City of Hamilton (2001−2021)
Panethnic group	2021		2016		2011		2006		2001	
Panethnic group	Pop.	%	Pop.	%	Pop.	%	Pop.	%	Pop.	%
European (Note: Statistic includes all persons that did not make up part of a visible minority or an indigenous identity.)	407,445	72.64%	415,735	78.75%	419,345	82.28%	421,925	84.83%	425,410	87.82%
South Asian	34,790	6.2%	22,105	4.19%	17,240	3.38%	14,765	2.97%	11,000	2.27%
African	28,415	5.07%	20,245	3.83%	16,110	3.16%	13,900	2.79%	10,455	2.16%
Middle Eastern (Note: Statistic includes total responses of "West Asian" and "Arab" under visible minority section on census.)	22,855	4.07%	15,130	2.87%	11,335	2.22%	8,840	1.78%	5,765	1.19%
Southeast Asian (Note: Statistic includes total responses of "Filipino" and "Southeast Asian" under visible minority section on census.)	20,175	3.6%	14,655	2.78%	13,045	2.56%	10,035	2.02%	8,880	1.83%
East Asian (Note: Statistic includes total responses of "Chinese", "Korean", and "Japanese" under visible minority section on census.)	14,470	2.58%	13,220	2.5%	11,335	2.22%	11,825	2.38%	9,715	2.01%
Indigenous	12,520	2.23%	12,135	2.3%	10,320	2.02%	7,625	1.53%	6,270	1.29%
Latin American	11,145	1.99%	8,425	1.6%	7,335	1.44%	5,585	1.12%	4,250	0.88%
Other/Multiracial (Note: Statistic includes total responses of "Visible minority, n.i.e." and "Multiple visible minorities" under visible minority section on census.)	9,095	1.62%	6,275	1.19%	3,570	0.7%	2,890	0.58%	2,625	0.54%
Total responses	560,915	98.52%	527,930	98.33%	509,635	98.02%	497,395	98.58%	484,385	98.8%
Total population	569,353	100%	536,917	100%	519,949	100%	504,559	100%	490,268	100%
Note: Totals greater than 100% due to multiple origin responses

=== Language ===
Hamilton has a notable French community for which provincial services are offered in French. In Ontario, urban centres where there are at least 5,000 Francophones are designated areas where bilingual provincial services have to be offered. As per the 2016 census, the Francophone community maintains a population of 6,760, while 30,530 residents, or 5.8% of the city's population, have knowledge of both official languages. The Franco-Ontarian community of Hamilton boasts two school boards, the public Conseil scolaire Viamonde and the Catholic Conseil scolaire catholique MonAvenir, which operate five schools (2 secondary and 3 elementary). Additionally, the city maintains a Francophone community health centre that is part of the LHIN (Centre de santé communautaire Hamilton/Niagara), a cultural centre (Centre français Hamilton), three daycare centres, a provincially funded employment centre (Options Emploi), a community college site (Collège Boréal) and a community organization that supports the development of the francophone community in Hamilton (ACFO Régionale Hamilton).

Mother tongue languages in Hamilton (2001–2021)
Mother tongue	2021 Canadian census		2016 Canadian census		2011 Canadian census		2006 Canadian census		2001 Canadian census	
Mother tongue	Pop.	%	Pop.	%	Pop.	%	Pop.	%	Pop.	%
English	422,500	74.94%	401,030	75.58%	387,360	75.48%	369,010	74.19%	364,425	75.23%
Arabic	14,850	2.63%	9,515	1.79%	6,855	1.34%	6,720	1.35%	4,835	1%
Italian	14,280	2.53%	16,610	3.13%	18,055	3.52%	18,325	3.68%	20,550	4.24%
Serbo-Croatian	11,400	2.02%	12,055	2.27%	12,355	2.41%	13,185	2.65%	12,200	2.52%
Spanish	10,965	1.94%	8,300	1.56%	7,765	1.51%	5,855	1.18%	4,705	0.97%
French	9,075	1.61%	8,485	1.6%	8,620	1.68%	7,640	1.54%	8,000	1.65%
Portuguese	8,390	1.49%	7,915	1.49%	7,885	1.54%	8,205	1.65%	7,795	1.61%
Punjabi	7,425	1.32%	4,980	0.94%	4,265	0.83%	4,425	0.89%	2,995	0.62%
Polish	7,355	1.3%	7,710	1.45%	8,065	1.57%	9,060	1.82%	9,445	1.95%
Tagalog	6,545	1.16%	5,045	0.95%	4,260	0.83%	2,440	0.49%	2,345	0.48%
Urdu	6,525	1.16%	4,330	0.82%	3,425	0.67%	2,775	0.56%	1,930	0.4%
Mandarin	5,580	0.99%	4,475	0.84%	3,690	0.72%	3,225	0.65%	1,895	0.39%
Vietnamese	4,030	0.71%	3,370	0.64%	3,175	0.62%	3,335	0.67%	2,665	0.55%
Gujarati	3,445	0.61%	1,560	0.29%	1,040	0.2%	595	0.12%	580	0.12%
Aramaic	3,425	0.61%	2,605	0.49%	—N/a	—N/a	—N/a	—N/a	—N/a	—N/a
Persian	3,405	0.6%	2,620	0.49%	2,245	0.44%	1,855	0.37%	1,270	0.26%
German	3,285	0.58%	4,090	0.77%	4,735	0.92%	5,410	1.09%	5,595	1.16%
Cantonese	2,935	0.52%	2,945	0.55%	3,615	0.7%	4,275	0.86%	4,410	0.91%
Hindi	2,680	0.48%	1,180	0.22%	940	0.18%	695	0.14%	740	0.15%
Hungarian	2,250	0.4%	2,520	0.47%	3,115	0.61%	3,595	0.72%	3,755	0.78%
Dutch	2,205	0.39%	2,795	0.53%	3,140	0.61%	3,655	0.73%	3,680	0.76%
Russian	1,900	0.34%	1,530	0.29%	1,425	0.28%	1,270	0.26%	800	0.17%
Korean	1,825	0.32%	1,460	0.28%	1,510	0.29%	1,410	0.28%	1,420	0.29%
Romanian	1,745	0.31%	1,805	0.34%	1,765	0.34%	2,140	0.43%	1,345	0.28%
Greek	1,645	0.29%	1,740	0.33%	1,730	0.34%	1,680	0.34%	1,995	0.41%
Ukrainian	1,625	0.29%	1,770	0.33%	2,175	0.42%	2,810	0.56%	2,890	0.6%
Bengali	1,600	0.28%	1,260	0.24%	1,020	0.2%	795	0.16%	505	0.1%
Albanian	1,500	0.27%	1,380	0.26%	1,200	0.23%	—N/a	—N/a	—N/a	—N/a
Kurdish	1,445	0.26%	1,115	0.21%	1,060	0.21%	560	0.11%	665	0.14%
Somali	1,390	0.25%	1,080	0.2%	820	0.16%	685	0.14%	—N/a	—N/a
Malayalam	1,365	0.24%	740	0.14%	495	0.1%	390	0.08%	245	0.05%
Total responses	563,820	99.03%	530,635	98.83%	513,175	98.7%	497,395	98.58%	484,385	98.8%
Total population	569,353	100%	536,917	100%	519,949	100%	504,559	100%	490,268	100%
Includes mother tongue languages selected by at least 0.2 per cent of respondents.

=== Religion ===
Largest non-Christian religion in Hamilton CMA by census tract based on the 2021 census

According to the 2021 census, religious groups in Hamilton included:

- Christianity (309,780 persons or 55.2%)
- Irreligion (183,965 persons or 32.8%)
- Islam (37,980 persons or 6.8%)
- Hinduism (10,200 persons or 1.8%)
- Sikhism (7,270 persons or 1.3%)
- Buddhism (4,765 persons or 0.8%)
- Judaism (3,045 persons or 0.5%)
- Indigenous Spirituality (375 persons or 0.1%)
- Other (3,535 persons or 0.6%)

The most described religion in Hamilton is Christianity although other religions brought by immigrants are also growing. The 2011 census indicates that 67.6% of the population adheres to a Christian denomination, with Catholics being the largest at 34.3% of the city's population. The Christ the King Cathedral is the seat of the Diocese of Hamilton. Other denominations include the United Church (6.5%), Anglican (6.4%), Presbyterian (3.1%), Christian Orthodox (2.9%), and other denominations (9.8%). Other religions with significant populations include Islam (3.7%), Buddhist (0.9%), Sikh (0.8%), Hindu (0.8%), and Jewish (0.7%). Those with no religious affiliation accounted for 24.9% of the population.

== Government ==
Citizens of Hamilton are represented at all three levels of Canadian government: federal, provincial, and municipal. Hamilton is represented in the Parliament of Canada by five members of Parliament and in the Legislature of Ontario by five members of Provincial Parliament.

Federal MPs for Hamilton, Ontario
Party	Name	Electoral District	First elected
Conservative	Dan Muys	Flamborough—Glanbrook—Brant North	2021
Liberal	Aslam Rana	Hamilton Centre	2025
Conservative	Ned Kuruc	Hamilton East—Stoney Creek	2025
Liberal	Lisa Hepfner	Hamilton Mountain	2021
Liberal	John-Paul Danko	Hamilton West—Ancaster—Dundas	2025
Ref:

Provincial MPPs for Hamilton, Ontario
Party	Name	Electoral District	First elected
Progressive Conservative	Donna Skelly	Flamborough—Glanbrook	2018
New Democratic	Robin Lennox	Hamilton Centre	2025
Progressive Conservative	Jeff Beattie	Hamilton East—Stoney Creek	2026
Progressive Conservative	Monica Ciriello	Hamilton Mountain	2025
New Democratic	Sandy Shaw	Hamilton West—Ancaster—Dundas	2018
Ref:

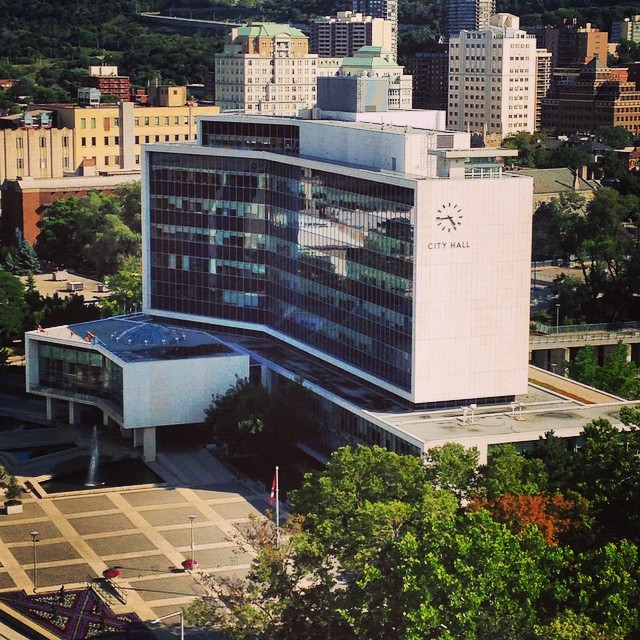
Hamilton City Hall is the seat of municipal government.

Hamilton's municipal government has a mayor, elected citywide, and 15 city councillors—one per city ward—to serve on the Hamilton City Council. The province grants the Hamilton City Council authority to govern through the Municipal Act of Ontario. Hamilton's current mayor is Keanin Loomis, who was elected on October 26, 2026.

Hamilton is served by four school boards: the English language Hamilton-Wentworth District School Board and Hamilton-Wentworth Catholic District School Board and the French language Conseil scolaire Viamonde and Conseil scolaire catholique MonAvenir. Each school board is governed by trustees. The English language school boards are represented by trustees elected from wards in Hamilton. The HWDSB has 11 trustees and the HWCDB has 9 trustees. The French language school boards are represented by one trustee each from Hamilton and the surrounding area.

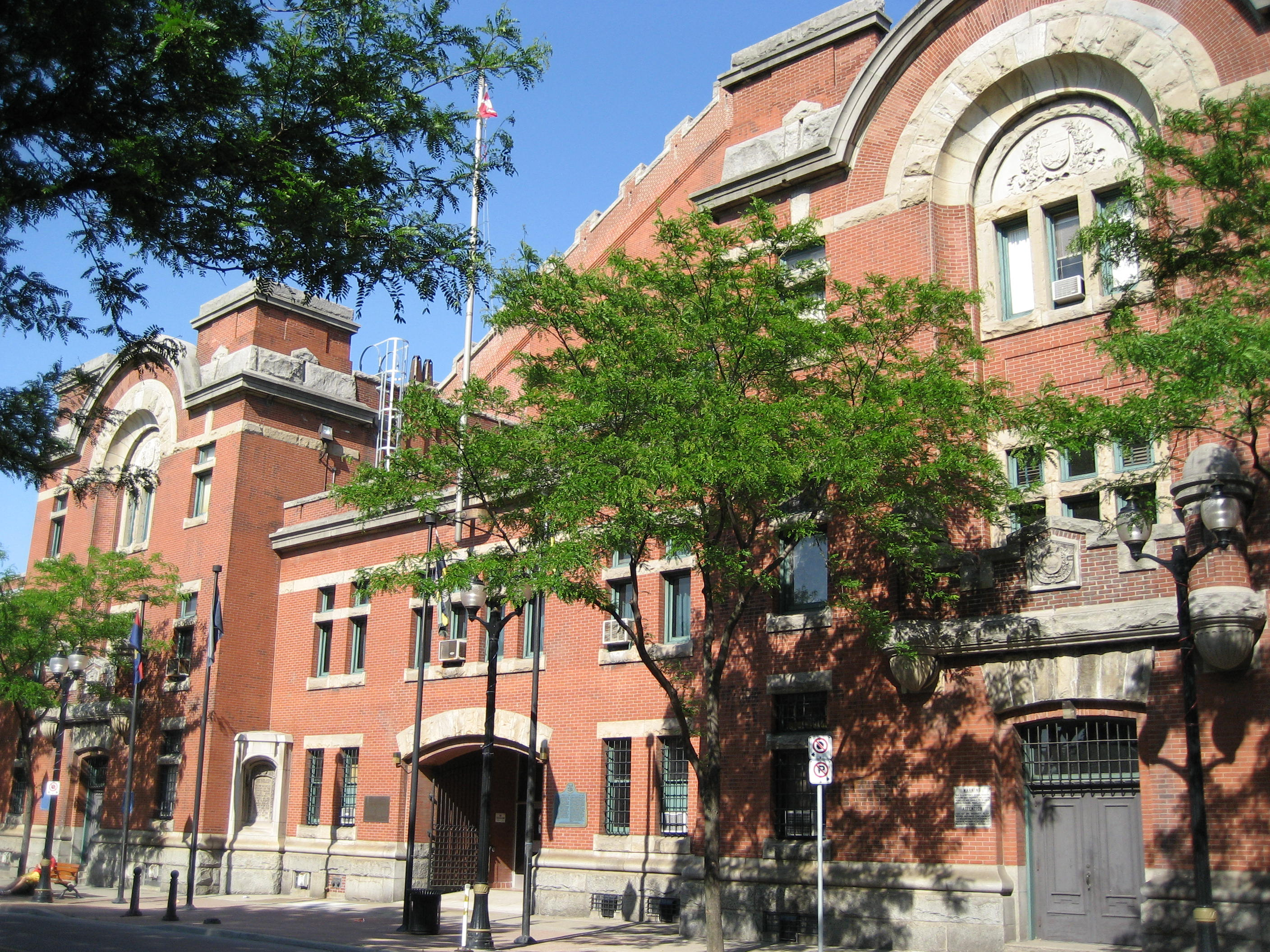
John Weir Foote V.C. Armoury is a Canadian Forces facility that houses several regiments based in Hamilton.

The Canadian Military maintains a presence in Hamilton, with the John Weir Foote Armoury in the downtown core on James Street North, housing the Royal Hamilton Light Infantry as well as the 11th Field Hamilton-Wentworth Battery and the Argyll and Sutherland Highlanders of Canada. The Hamilton Reserve Barracks on Pier Nine houses the naval reserve division HMCS Star, 23 Service Battalion and the 23 Field Ambulance.

=== Crime ===
The Criminal Code of Canada is the chief piece of legislation defining criminal conduct and penalty. The Hamilton Police Service is chiefly responsible for the enforcement of federal and provincial law. Although the Hamilton Police Service has authority to enforce, bylaws passed by the Hamilton City Council are mainly enforced by Provincial Offences Officers employed by the City of Hamilton.

In 2020, the city saw 18 murders and 51 shootings (up from 47 in 2019), the most shootings the city seen in at least a decade. 2021 saw the homicides in the city increase to 20, giving the city a rate of around 3.5 per 100,000 residents. Hamilton ranked first in Canada for police-reported hate crimes in 2016, with 12.5 hate crimes per 100,000 population. Organized crime also has a notable presence in Hamilton with three centralized Mafia organizations: the Luppino crime family, the Papalia crime family, and the Musitano crime family. Street gangs such as the Original/Oriental Blood Brothers & the Oriole Crescent Crips, and biker crews such as Satan's Choice MC and the Hells Angels also have presence in Hamilton.

== Culture ==
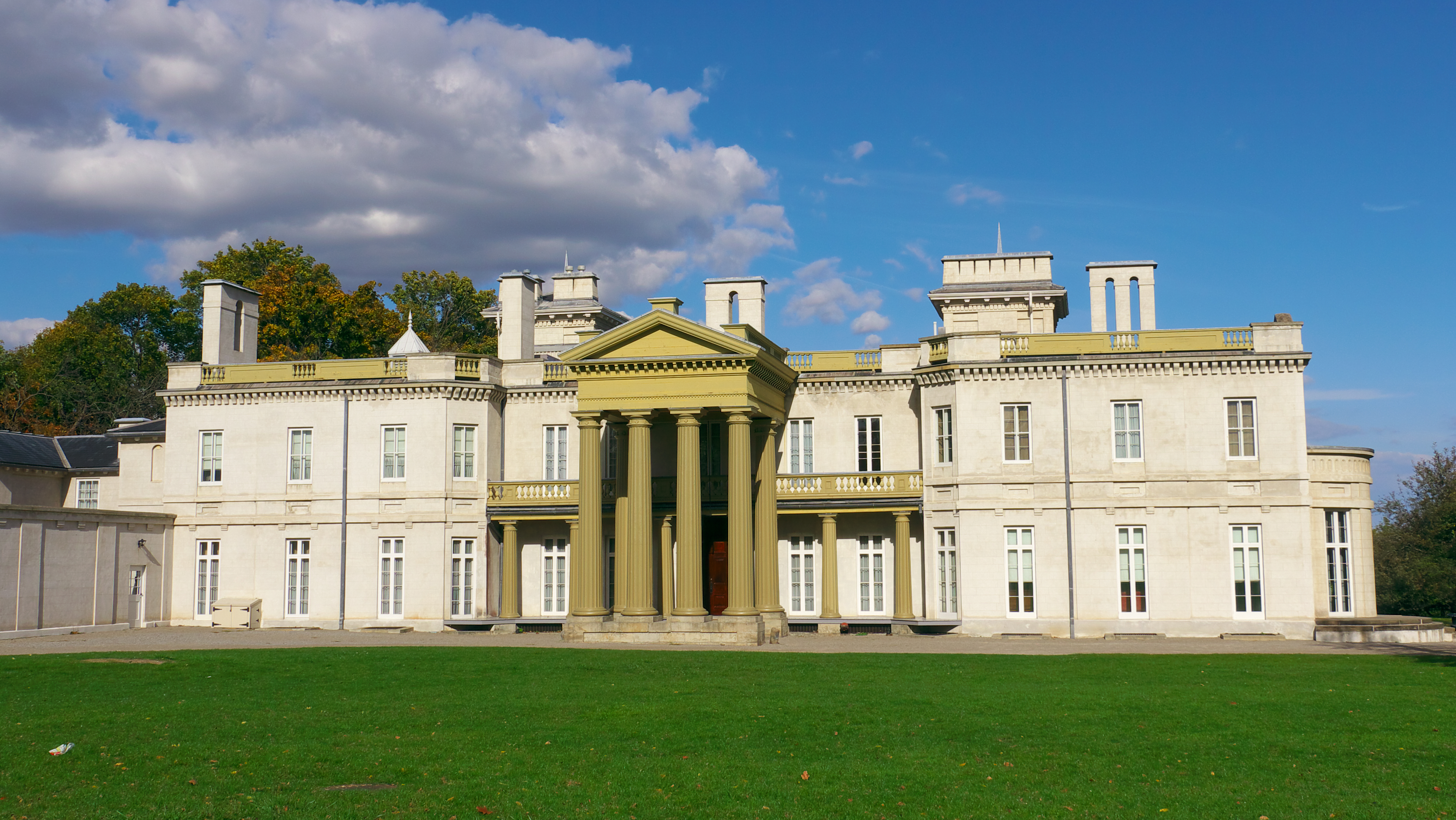
Dundurn Castle is a neoclassical mansion. It is presently a major attraction and landmark for the city.

Hamilton's local attractions include the Canadian Warplane Heritage Museum, the HMCS Haida National Historic Site, Dundurn Castle (the residence of an Allan MacNab, the 8th Premier of Canada West), the Royal Botanical Gardens, the Canadian Football Hall of Fame, the African Lion Safari Park, the Cathedral of Christ the King, the Workers' Arts and Heritage Centre, and the Hamilton Museum of Steam & Technology.

As of September 2018, there are 40 pieces in the city's Public Art Collection. The works are owned and maintained by the city. Founded in 1914, the Art Gallery of Hamilton is Ontario's third largest public art gallery. The gallery has over 9,000 works in its permanent collection that focus on three areas: 19th-century European, Historical Canadian and Contemporary Canadian. The McMaster Museum of Art (MMA), founded at McMaster University in 1967, houses and exhibits the university's art collection of more than 7,000 objects.

Supercrawl is a large community arts and music festival that takes place in September in the James Street North area of the city. In 2018, Supercrawl celebrated its 10th anniversary with over 220,000 visitors. In March 2015, Hamilton was host to the JUNO Awards.

The Hamilton Film Festival stages an annual program of over 100 independent feature and short films annually, many but not all with direct production connections to the city.

Growth in the arts and culture sector has garnered media attention for Hamilton. A 2006 article in The Globe and Mail, entitled "Go West, Young Artist", focused on Hamilton's growing art scene. The Factory: Hamilton Media Arts Centre, opened a new home on James Street North in 2006. Art galleries have sprung up on streets across the city: James Street, King William Street, Locke Street and King Street. The opening of the Downtown Arts Centre on Rebecca Street has spurred creative activities in the core. The Community Centre for Media Arts (CCMA) continues to operate in downtown Hamilton. The CCMA works with marginalized populations and combines new media services with arts education and skills development programming.

=== Sports ===
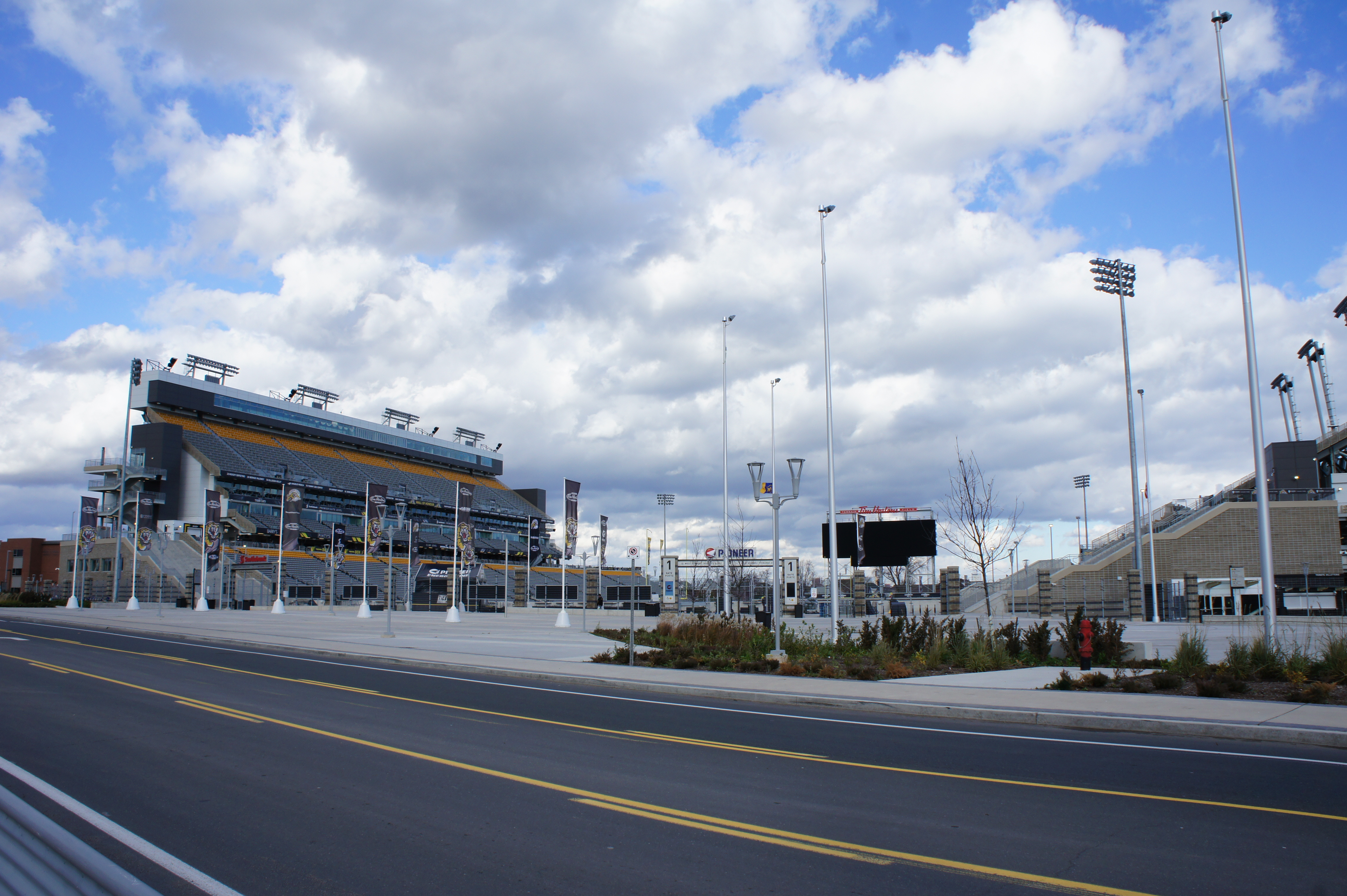
Hamilton Stadium is a multi-purpose stadium in Hamilton. It is presently used as the home stadium for the CFL's Hamilton Tiger-Cats.

Hamilton hosted Canada's first major international athletic event, the first Commonwealth Games (then called the British Empire Games) in 1930. Hamilton bid for the Commonwealth Games in 2010 but lost to New Delhi. On November 7, 2009, in Guadalajara, Mexico, it was announced Toronto would host the 2015 Pan Am Games after beating out two rival South American cities, Lima, Peru, and Bogotá, Colombia. The city of Hamilton co-hosted the Games with Toronto. Hamilton Mayor Fred Eisenberger said "the Pan Am Games will provide a 'unique opportunity for Hamilton to renew major sport facilities giving Hamiltonians a multi-purpose stadium, a 50-metre swimming pool, and an international-calibre velodrome to enjoy for generations to come'." Hamilton's major sports complexes include Hamilton Stadium and TD Coliseum.

Hamilton is represented by the Tiger-Cats in the Canadian Football League. The team traces its origins to the 1869 "Hamilton Foot Ball Club". Hamilton is also home to the Canadian Football Hall of Fame museum. The museum hosts an annual induction event in a week-long celebration that includes school visits, a golf tournament, a formal induction dinner and concludes with the Hall of Fame game involving the local CFL Hamilton Tiger-Cats at Tim Hortons Field. The 108th championship game of the Canadian Football League, the Grey Cup, was played in Hamilton in 2021 and won by the Winnipeg Blue Bombers.

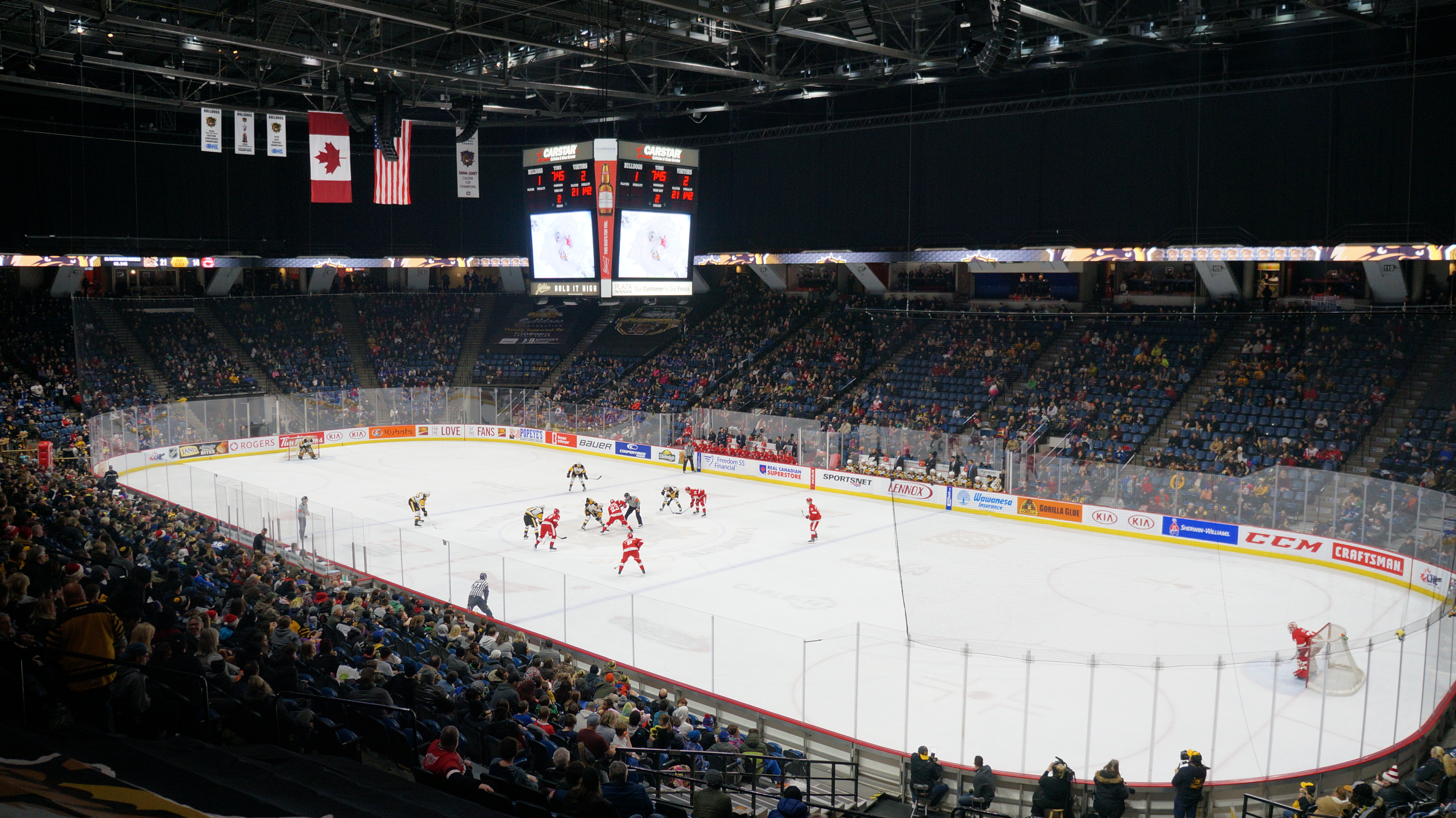
TD Coliseum is an indoor arena and was the home arena for the OHL's Hamilton Bulldogs.

In 2019, Forge FC debuted as Hamilton's soccer team in the Canadian Premier League. The team plays at Hamilton Stadium and shares the venue with the Tiger-Cats. They finished their inaugural season as champions of the league.

In 2019, the Hamilton Honey Badgers debuted as Hamilton's basketball team in the Canadian Elite Basketball League. The team played its home games at the FirstOntario Centre. In 2022, the Honey Badgers relocated to Brampton, Ontario due to the renovations occurring at FirstOntarioCentre.

In 2003, Hamilton hosted the UCI Road World Championships, the second time the cycling event had been hosted in Canada.

The Around the Bay Road Race circumnavigates Hamilton Harbour. Although it is not a marathon distance, it is the longest continuously held long-distance foot race in North America. The local newspaper also hosts the amateur Spectator Indoor Games.

In addition to team sports, Hamilton is home to an auto race track, Flamboro Speedway and Canada's fastest half-mile harness horse racing track, Flamboro Downs. Another auto race track, Cayuga International Speedway, is near Hamilton in the Haldimand County community of Nelles Corners, between Hagersville and Cayuga.

In 2026, Hamilton became home to two professional hockey teams. The New York Islanders moved their American Hockey League (AHL) affiliate to Hamilton. The move was made official on March 31, 2026, and the name Hamilton Hammers was unveiled on May 21, 2026. On May 13, 2026, Hamilton was awarded an expansion team in the Professional Women's Hockey League (PWHL), the Hamilton Havoc.

Tier 1 Professional and Tier 2 teams
Club/Team	League/Tournaments	Venue/Stadium	Established	Championships/Titles
Hamilton Tiger-Cats	Canadian Football League	Hamilton Stadium	1950 (first Hamilton team in 1869)	8 (15 in total)
Hamilton Hammers	American Hockey League	TD Coliseum	2002 (As Bridgeport Sound Tigers)	4 (Not Calder Cup Championships)
Forge FC	Canadian Premier League	Hamilton Stadium	2017 (began play in 2019)	4 (7 in total)
Hamilton Havoc	Professional Women's Hockey League	TD Coliseum	2026 (expansion team)	0
Hamilton Cardinals	Canadian Baseball League	Bernie Arbour Memorial Stadium	1958	1
Toronto Rock	National Lacrosse League	TD Coliseum	1998 (As Ontario Raiders)	7 (16 in total)

== Education ==
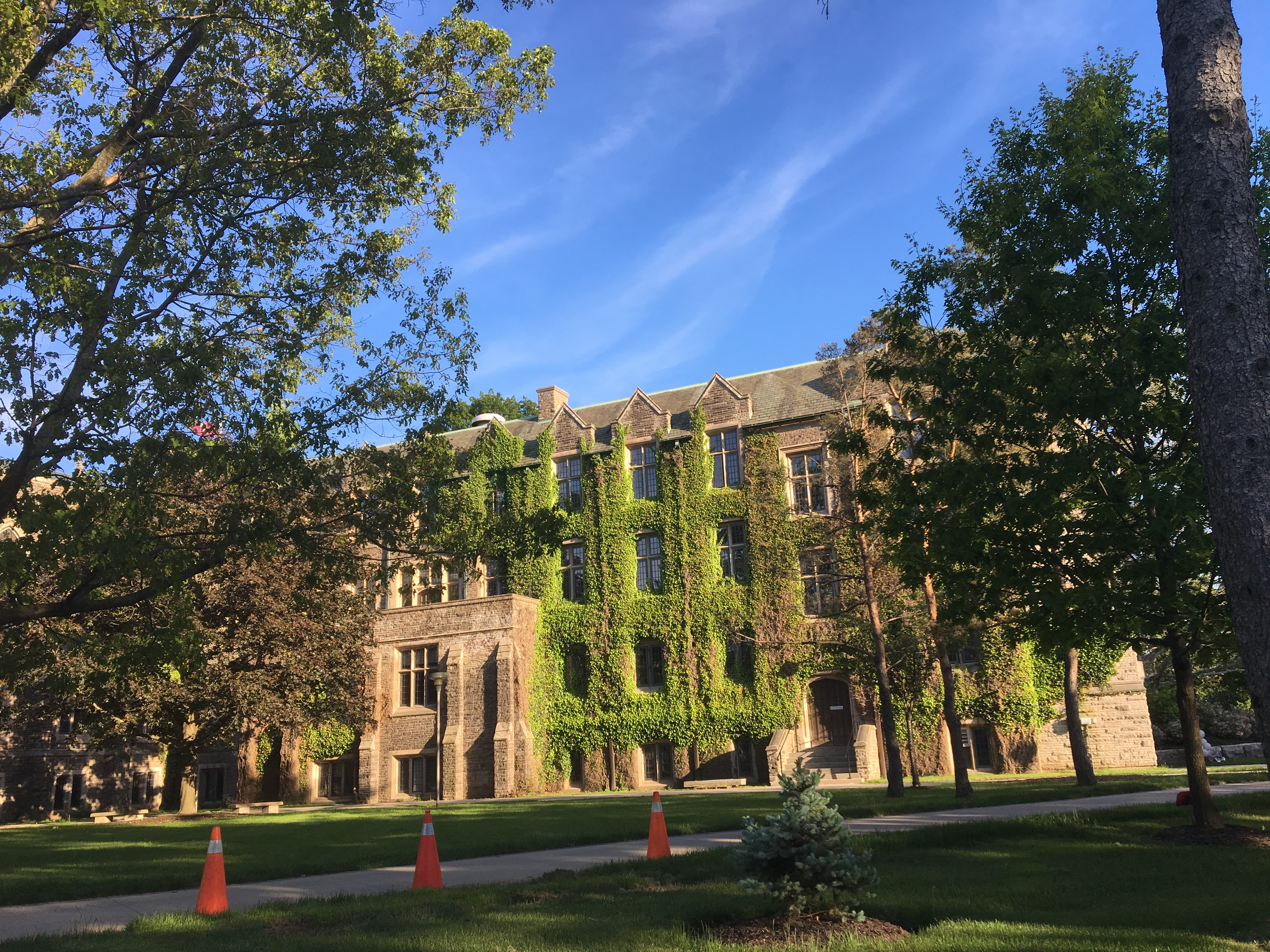
McMaster University is the only university whose main campus is in the city.

Hamilton is home to several post-secondary institutions.

- McMaster University moved to the city in 1930 and has 37,256 students as of October 2025, 15% of them being international students.
- McMaster Divinity College, a Christian seminary affiliated with the Baptist Convention of Ontario and Quebec since 1957. It is located on the McMaster University campus and it is affiliated with the university.
- Mohawk College of Applied Arts and Technology since 1967 with over 32,500 students.
- Redeemer University, a private Christian liberal arts and science university opened in 1982.

Four school boards administer public education for students from kindergarten through high school. The Hamilton-Wentworth District School Board manages 93 public schools, while the Hamilton-Wentworth Catholic District School Board operates 57 schools in the greater Hamilton area. The Conseil scolaire Viamonde operates one elementary and one secondary school (École secondaire Georges-P.-Vanier) in the area, and the Conseil scolaire catholique MonAvenir operates two elementary schools and one secondary school.

Calvin Christian School, Providence Christian School and Timothy Christian School are independent Christian elementary schools. Hamilton District Christian High School, Rehoboth Christian High School and Guido de Bres Christian High School are independent Christian high schools in the area. Both HDCH and Guido de Brès participate in the city's interscholastic athletics. Hillfield Strathallan College is on the West Hamilton mountain and is a CAIS member, non-profit school for children from early Montessori ages through grade twelve and has around 1,300 students. Columbia International College is Canada's largest private boarding high school, with 1,700 students from 73 countries.

The Dundas Valley School of Art is an independent art school founded in the city in 1964. In 1998, as a joint venture with McMaster University, a full-time diploma program was launched for students. The Hamilton Conservatory for the Arts is home to many of the area's young actors, dancers, musicians, singers and visual artists. The school is known for having a keyboard studio, dance studios, art and sculpting studios, gallery space and a 300-seat recital hall.

Hamilton is home to two think tanks, the Centre for Cultural Renewal and Cardus, which deals with social architecture, culture, urbanology, economics and education and also publishes the LexView Policy Journal and Comment Magazine.

Brock University of St. Catharines, Ontario had a satellite campus till its sale in 2020.

== Infrastructure ==
=== Transportation ===
The primary highways serving Hamilton are Highway 403, the QEW, the Lincoln M. Alexander Parkway, and the Red Hill Valley Parkway. Other highways connecting Hamilton include Highway 5, Highway 6 and Highway 8. Public transportation is provided by the Hamilton Street Railway, which operates an extensive local bus system. Hamilton and Metrolinx will build a provincially-funded LRT line (Hamilton LRT) in the 2020s. Intercity public transportation, including frequent service to Toronto, is provided by GO Transit. The Hamilton GO Centre (formerly the Toronto, Hamilton and Buffalo Railway station), as well as Confederation GO Station and West Harbour GO Station are three commuter rail stations on the Lakeshore West line of GO Transit that serve the city, with the latter having hourly service to Toronto. Regional bus services operated by GO Transit also run to Brantford, Kitchener, and cities along the Ontario Highway 407. Aldershot station in nearby Burlington, is the intercity (Via Rail) station for both Burlington and Hamilton.

In the 1940s, the John C. Munro Hamilton International Airport was a wartime air force training station. Today, managed by TradePort International Corporation, passenger traffic at the Hamilton terminal has grown from 90,000 in 1996 to approximately 900,000 in 2002 with mostly domestic and vacation destinations in the United States, Mexico and Central America. The airport's mid-term growth target for its passenger service is five million air travellers annually. The airport's air cargo sector has 24–7 operational capability and strategic geographic location, allowing its capacity to increase by 50% since 1996; 91,000 metric tonnes (100,000 tons) of cargo passed through the airport in 2002. Courier companies with operations at the airport include United Parcel Service and Cargojet Canada. In 2003, the city began developing a 30-year growth management strategy which called, in part, for a massive aerotropolis industrial park centred on Hamilton Airport. Advocates of the aerotropolis proposal, now known as the Airport Employment Growth District, tout it as a solution to the city's shortage of employment lands. The closest other international airport to Hamilton is Toronto Pearson International Airport, located northeast of the city in Mississauga.

A report by Hemson Consulting identified an opportunity to develop 1,000 hectares (2,500 acres) of greenfields (the size of the Royal Botanical Gardens) that could create an estimated 90,000 jobs by 2031. A proposed aerotropolis industrial park at Highway 6 and 403, has been debated at City Hall for years. Opponents feel the city needs to do more investigation about the cost to taxpayers.

Hamilton also plays a major role in Ontario's marine shipping industry as the Port of Hamilton is Ontario's busiest port handling between 9 and 12 million tonnes of cargo annually.

==== Major highways ====
- Highway 403
- Queen Elizabeth Way
- Red Hill Valley Parkway
- Lincoln M. Alexander Parkway
- Highway 5
- Highway 6
- Highway 8

=== Health ===
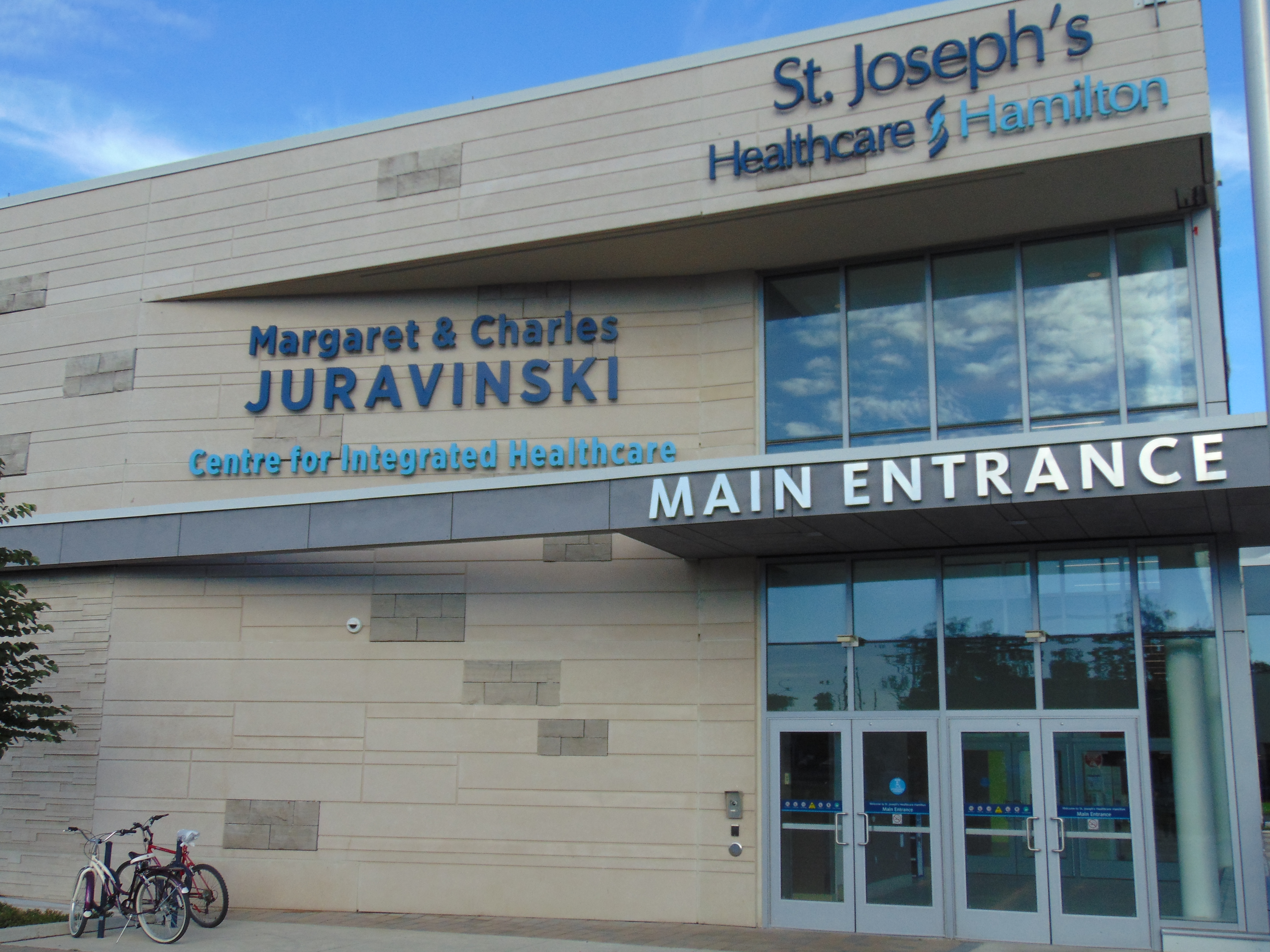
Margaret & Charles Juravinski Centre for Integrated Healthcare at the West 5th Campus; 2016.

The city is served by the Hamilton Health Sciences hospital network of five hospitals with more than 1,100 beds: Hamilton General Hospital, Juravinski Hospital, McMaster University Medical Centre (which includes McMaster Children's Hospital), St. Peter's Hospital and West Lincoln Memorial Hospital. Other buildings under Hamilton Health Sciences include Juravinski Cancer Centre, Regional Rehabilitation Centre, Ron Joyce Children's Health Centre, and the West End Clinic and Urgent Care Centre. Hamilton Health Sciences is the largest employer in the Hamilton area and serves as academic teaching hospital affiliated with McMaster University and Mohawk College. The only hospital in Hamilton not under Hamilton Health Sciences is St. Joseph's Healthcare Hamilton, which has 777 beds and three campuses (Charlton Campus, King Campus, and West 5th Campus). This healthcare group provides inpatient and outpatient services, and mental illness or addiction help.

== Sister cities ==
The City of Hamilton is twinned with ten sister cities:

- Shawinigan, Quebec, Canada (1958)
- Kaga, Ishikawa, Japan (1968)
  - Sister City agreement originally with Dundas, Ontario.
  - Converted to sister city agreement with the City of Hamilton following Dundas's amalgamation into Hamilton.
- Mangalore, Karnataka, India (1968)
- Fukuyama, Hiroshima, Japan (1975)
- Racalmuto, Sicily, Italy (1987)
- Ma'Anshan, Anhui, China (1987)
- Flint, Michigan, United States (1987)
- Sarasota, Florida, United States (1991)
- Valle Peligna, Abruzzo, Italy (1991)
- Monterrey, Nuevo León, Mexico (1993)

== See also ==
- Hamilton City Council
- Auchmar House
- List of people from Hamilton
- List of tallest buildings in Hamilton
