= London Christian High =

Location
- 24 Braesyde Avenue; London, Ontario, N5W 1V3; Canada; 42.9752°N 81.1705°W

Information
- School type: Private
- Motto: Where every student is seen, known, and loved.
- Founded: 1965
- Principal: Gabriella Hoogstra
- Grades: 9-12
- Enrollment: Approximately 250
- Language: English
- Colour: Blue/White
- Team name: Lynx
- Website: www.londonchristianhigh.ca

London Christian High, LCH or London Christian is a Christian private secondary school in London, Ontario. LCH was formed in 1965, and is governed by a membership-elected Board. It is a member of the Ontario Alliance of Christian Schools, and follows the Province of Ontario education curriculum. LCH is a member school of the Thames Valley Regional Athletic Association and of WOSSAA as well as OFSAA. LCH is categorized as an "A" school.

London Christian High was formerly known as London District Christian Secondary School.
