= Mars Hill Academy =

Location
- Mason, Ohio; United States; 39.341°N 84.291°W

Information
- Type: Christian, Classical
- Motto: Veritas, Decorum, Bonitas
- Established: 1996
- Headmaster: Mike McKenna
- Grades: PK–12
- Enrollment: 250
- Website: marshill.edu

Mars Hill Academy is a private, PK-12, classical Christian school, located in Mason, Ohio. It was established in 1996. It is a accredited by the Association of Classical and Christian Schools.
