= Farel Reformed Theological Seminary =

Canadian Christian higher educational institution

Farel Reformed Theological Seminary is a Reformed, theological school in Montreal, Quebec for the training of pastors, evangelists, teachers and those simply interested in studying theology. Farel Seminary has an administrative agreement with the Institut de Formation Théologique de Montréal, a fully accredited theological university in Montreal.

== History ==
The Evangelical Reformed Alliance (Alliance réformée Évangélique or A.R.E.) was founded in 1978 at Montmorency in the region of Quebec, on the basis of the Montmorency Manifesto. In order to promote Reformed work in Quebec, the members of A.R.E. formulated three objectives:

1. to help in the establishment of Farel Institute (now called Farel Reformed Theological Seminary), a theological faculty, so that students could complete theological education;
2. to launch a magazine of biblical and theological reflection, to be called Parole;
3. to revise and publish French Reformed works such as l'Institution chrétienne by John Calvin.

A.R.E. called on the Rev. Martin Geleynse to work on the formation of Farel Institute. His parish, the Christian Reformed Church of Montreal, liberated him to permit him to become the head of Farel Institute. Daniel Racine was named editor-in-chief of Parole, and Harold Kallemeyn was put in charge of publications for Farel.

The beginnings of Farel Seminary were modest. For some time a need for such an organism had been felt in Quebec. After several negative experiences in which French-speaking Québécois tried to study in the established anglophone theological institutions the pastor of St.Marc's Church in Sainte-Foy agreed to offer courses in history and in dogmatics. Two students were enrolled in the first course. The enthusiasm of those students communicated itself to others and so other courses were offered. Thus it happened that John Miller began to teach biblical languages. And it was he who suggested that the new-born theological faculty be named "Institut Farel"—after the 16th century Protestant Reformer William Farel. An extension course was offered to a Christian community in Montmorency, and the demand for teaching grew. Daniel Racine, who was the French secretary of the Canadian Bible Society (member of the United Bible Societies) and one of the founding members of the South Shore Church in Montreal, was invited to teach at Farel. The arrival of Martin Geleynse as co-ordinator and dean of the Institute permitted the faculty to develop a structure and to make itself known more widely. It was then a question of administering the offices and the personnel, of establishing a teaching programme, and of promoting the faculty in other institutions. When Martin Geleynse left in 1986, Jean-Guy deBlois became the new co-ordinator, and part of the administrative council, which also included Jean Zoellner, Ross Davidson and David Craig. After a period of questioning and reorientation, Farel returned to more modest dimensions, even as it offered a new program of studies leading to a Bachelor's degree in theology.

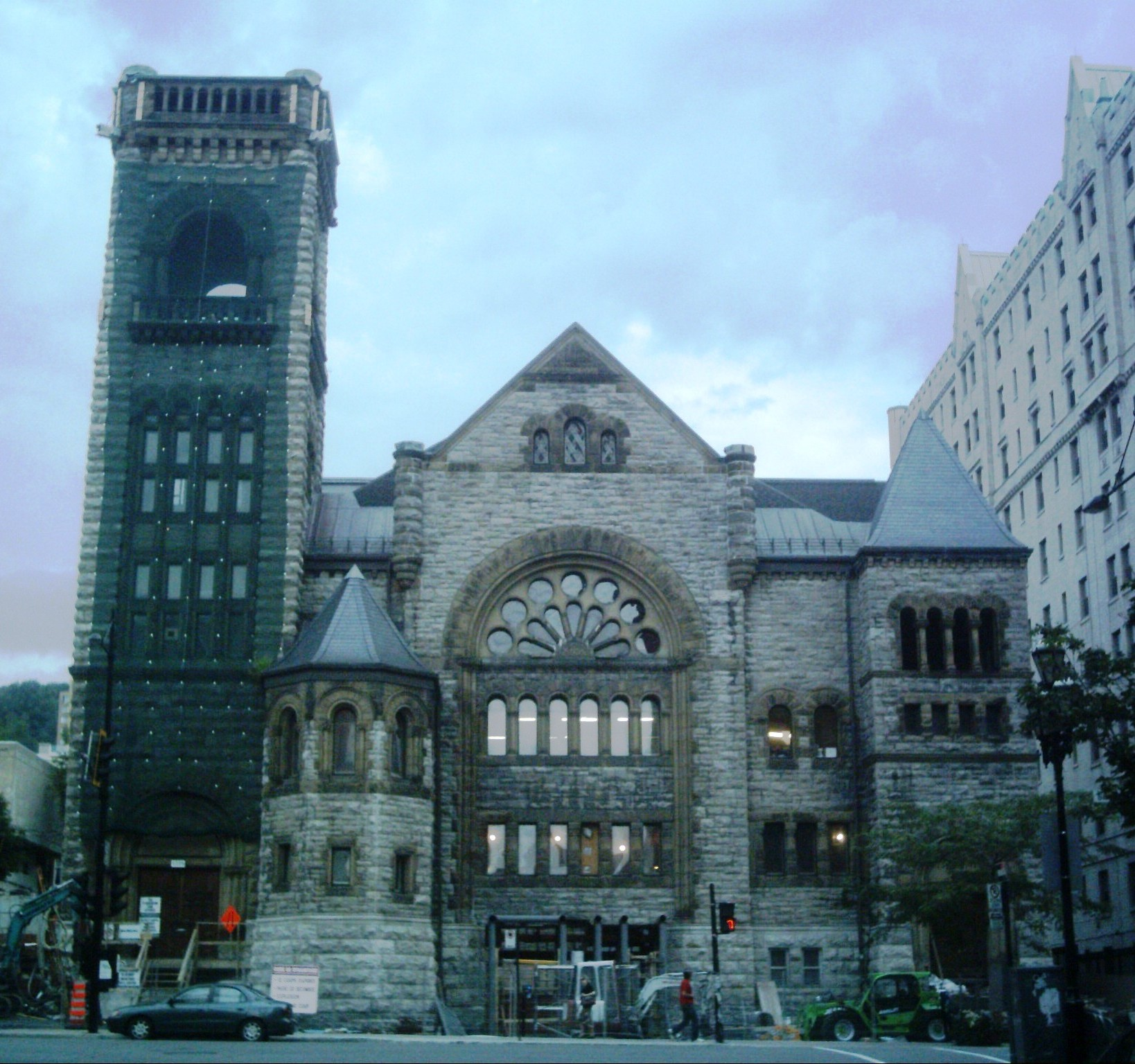
Farel Reformed Theological Seminary at the Erskine and American United Church, on Sherbrooke Street, Montreal

In 2001 Farel Seminary moved from Quebec City to Montreal where it took up residence in a renovated section of the Erskine and American United Church. At this time young professors were added to the school and the work gained new momentum. In the Summer of 2008 the Montreal Museum of Fine Arts took possession of the Erskine and American United Church building. Because this building was remodelled into the Claire and Marc Bourgie Pavilion, Farel Seminary took up residence since September 2008 in another Museum-owned property on Bishop Street only a few steps from the old building.

In recent years, Dr. Daniel Timmer and then Dr. Christian Adjemian have served as dean and professor of biblical studies.

== Doctrinal basis ==
Farel Reformed Theological Seminary has an explicitly biblical and confessional Reformed theological basis. It seeks to be faithful to the message of the Bible and the Reformed Confessions of the 16th and 17th centuries (principally, the Heidelberg Catechism and the Westminster Confession).
