= Alisa =

Alisa and Alissa are female given names, versions of Alice, used in Russia, Ukraine, Finland, Estonia, and other countries. Notable people and characters with these names include:

== Alisa ==
=== People ===
- Alisa Agafonova (born 1991), Ukrainian competitive ice dancer
- Alisa Ahmann (born 1994), German fashion model
- Alisa Aksyonova (1931–2026), Russian museum director
- Alisa Bellettini (1954–2016), American television producer
- Alisa Bokulich, American philosopher of science
- Alisa Buchinger (born 1992), Austrian karateka
- Alisa Burras (born 1975), American professional basketball player
- Alisa Camplin (born 1974), Australian aerial skier
- Alisa Childers (born 1975), American singer and songwriter
- Alisa Chumachenko, Lithuanian entrepreneur
- Alisa Craig (1922–2005), American novelist Charlotte MacLeod's pen name
- Alisa Drei (born 1978), Finnish competitive figure skater
- Alisa Durbrow (born 1988), Japanese model, actress, and singer
- Alisa Efimova (born 1999), Finnish-Russian pair skater
- Alisa Fedichkina (born 2002), Russian competitive figure skater
- Alisa Freindlich (born 1934), Soviet and Russian actress
- Alisa Galliamova (born 1972), Russian chess player
- Alisa Ganieva (born 1985), Russian author and essayist
- Alisa M. Goldstein, American genetic epidemiologist
- Alisa Harvey (born 1965), American middle-distance runner
- Alisa İsbir (born 2005), Turkish fencer
- Alisa Jakobi (born 1981), Estonian artist, actress, and graphic designer
- Alisa Kajornchaiyakul (born 1966), Thai beauty pageant winner
- Alisa Kano (born 1994), American group rhythmic gymnast
- Alisa Kelli Wise (born 1962), American lawyer and judge
- Alisa Kezheradze (1937–1996), American pianist and teacher
- Alisa Khaleyeva (born 1978), Azerbaijani swimmer
- Alisa Kireeva (born 1989), Ukrainian competitive figure skater
- Alisa Kirilyuk (born 1990), Russian sailor
- Alisa Kleybanova (born 1989), Russian tennis player
- Alisa Kolosova (born 1987), Russian mezzo-soprano
- Alisa Koonen (1889–1974), Russian and Soviet actress
- Alisa Kozhikina (born 2003), Russian singer
- Alisa Kresge (born 1985), American former basketball player and current coach
- Alisa Krylova (born 1982), Russian supermodel and international journalist
- Alisa Kwitney (born 1964), American writer
- Alisa LaGamma, American art historian
- Alisa Lepselter (born 1963), American film editor
- Alisa Margolis (born 1975), Ukrainian artist
- Alisa Marić (born 1970), Serbian chess player
- Alisa Melekhina (born 1991), American chess player and ballerina
- Alisa Mikonsaari (born 1993), Finnish figure skater
- Alisa Mitskog, American politician
- Alisa Mizuki (born 1976), Japanese actress, singer, and model
- Alisa Mon (born 1964), Soviet and Russian pop singer
- Alisa Ozhogina (born 2000), Russian-born Spanish synchro swimmer
- Alisa Palmer, Canadian theater director and playwright
- Alisa Persons, American writer and video filmmaker
- Alisa Reyes (born 1981), American actress
- Alisa Rukpinij (born 1995), Thai international footballer
- Alisa Sadikova (born 2003), Russian prodigy classical harpist
- Alisa Shevchenko (born 1984), Russian hacker and cybersecurity researcher
- Alisa Solomon (born 1956), American writer, journalist, and editor
- Alisa Summers, American drag queen
- Alisa Takigawa (born 1991), Japanese musician and singer-songwriter
- Alisa Tishchenko (born 2004), Russian group rhythmic gymnast
- Alisa Ueno (born 1989), Japanese singer, disk jockey, model, fashion designer, businessperson, and internet personality
- Alisa Vainio (born 1997), Finnish long-distance runner
- Alisa Valdes (born 1969), American author, journalist, and film producer
- Alisa Van Oijen (born 1992), Austrian professional racing cyclist
- Alisa Vetterlein (born 1988), German footballer
- Alisa Vox (born 1987), Russian singer, member of Leningrad (band)
- Alisa Walker, member of American country music band Redhead Express
- Alisa Walton (born 1970), Canadian actress
- Alisa Weilerstein (born 1982), American classical cellist
- Alisa Wells (1927–1988), American photographer
- Alisa Xayalith (born 1986), New Zealand musician
- Alisa Zhambalova (born 1994), Russian cross-country skier

=== Fictional characters ===
- Alisa Bannings, in the Japanese multimedia franchise Magical Girl Lyrical Nanoha
- Alisa Bosconovitch, from the Tekken video game series
- Alisa Jones, in the American web television series Jessica Jones
- Alisa Seleznyova, in Russian writer Kir Bulychev's series of children's science fiction books
- Alisa Tager, or Cipher, from "X-Men" comics
- Alisa Mikhailovna Kujou, the female main character of the series Alya Sometimes Hides Her Feelings in Russian

== Alissa ==
- Alissa Anderegg (born 1994), American beauty pageant titleholder and Alzheimer's activist
- Alissa Bjerkhoel, American lawyer
- Alissa Chavez, American inventor, entrepreneur, and engineer
- Alissa Crans, American mathematician
- Alissa Czisny (born 1987), American competitive figure skater
- Alissa Firsova (born 1986), Russian-British classical composer, pianist, and conductor
- Alissa Golob, Canadian anti-abortion and women's rights activist
- Alissa J. Rubin, American journalist and writer
- Alissa Johnson (born 1987), American ski jumper
- Alissa Jordaan (born 2003), Australian Paralympic athlete
- Alissa Jung (born 1981), German actress and physician
- Alissa Kallinikou (born 1985), Cypriot sprinter
- Alissa Keny-Guyer (born 1959), American politician
- Alissa M. Weaver, American oncologist
- Alissa Moreno, American singer, songwriter, musician, and actress
- Alissa Musto, American singer, pianist, and songwriter
- Alissa Nutting, American author and creative writing professor
- Alissa Pili (born 2001), American basketball player
- Alissa Quart (born 1972), American nonfiction writer, critic, journalist, editor, and poet
- Alissa St Laurent (born 1984), Canadian ultramarathon runner
- Alissa Thomas-Newborn, American Orthodox Jewish spiritual leader
- Alissa Walser (born 1961), German writer, translator, and artist
- Alissa White-Gluz (born 1985), Canadian singer
- Alissa Wykes (born 1967/1968), American football player
- Alissa Yagi (born 1995), Japanese actress and model
- Alissa York (born 1970), Canadian writer

== See also ==
- Alyssa (disambiguation)
- Ailsa (disambiguation)
- Arisa (disambiguation)
