= Kolosov =

Kolosov (masculine, Russian: Колосов) or Kolosova (feminine, Russian: Колосова) is a Russian surname, which is derived from the Russian word "колос" (wheat ear). Notable people with the surname include:

- Alexandra Kolosova (1802–1880), Russian actress
- Alisa Kolosova (born 1987), Russian opera singer
- Andrei Kolosov (born 1989), Belarusian ice hockey player
- Eugenia Kolosova (1780–1869), Russian ballerina
- Gury Kolosov (1867–1936), Russian Soviet mathematician
- Jacqueline Kolosov, American poet and writer
- Margarita Kolosov (born 2004), German rhythmic gymnast
- Sergei Kolosov (born 1986), Belarusian ice hockey player
- Sergey Kolosov (1921–2012), Russian Soviet film director and screenwriter
- Yakym Kolosov, regional police ispravnic, founder of Yakymivka

== See also ==
- Cape Kolosov, a headland of Antarctica
