= Ailsa =

Ailsa may refer to:

== People ==
- Ailsa (name), including a list of people with the name
- Marquess of Ailsa, title in the Peerage of the United Kingdom created in 1831

== Places ==
- Ailsa Craig, an island in the outer Firth of Clyde, Scotland
- Ailsa Craig, Ontario, North Middlesex, Ontario, Canada
- Ailsa Craig (South Orkney Islands)
- Ailsa Farms, New Jersey, U.S.

== Other uses ==
- Ailsa (car) (1907–1910), car manufactured in Glasgow by Hugh Kennedy & Company
- Ailsa Bay Distillery, a whisky distillery, co-located with the Girvan distillery and owned by William Grant & Sons
- Ailsa Course, a golf course in Scotland, near Ailsa Craig
- Ailsa (film), a 1994 Irish film
- Ailsa Craig Engines, manufacturer of marine and specialist made to order engines from 1891 to 1972
- Ailsa Shipbuilding Company, shipbuilding company based in Troon, Scotland
- Ailsa Stewart, fictional character in the Australian soap opera Home and Away
- Volvo Ailsa B55, double-decker bus chassis built in Scotland
- Ailsa Craig, a variety of tomato

== See also ==
- Alisa (disambiguation)
- Elsa (disambiguation)
