= Sheelagh Islands =

Island group in Enderby Land, Antarctica

Coordinates: 66°32′S 50°12′E

Sheelagh Islands is a group of small islands lying 4.8 km (3 mi) south of Cape Kolosov, near the mouth of Amundsen Bay in Enderby Land. They were possibly the site of the landing from an aircraft by Riiser-Larsen on December 22, 1929. An ANARE (Australian National Antarctic Research Expeditions) party landed on them on February 14, 1958. Named by Antarctic Names Committee of Australia (ANCA) for the wife of R.H.J. Thompson, Administrative Officer of the Antarctic Division and second-in-command of the expedition.

== See also ==
- List of Antarctic and sub-Antarctic islands
