= Association of Reformed Institutions of Higher Education =

The Association of Reformed Institutions of Higher Education (ARIHE), recently renamed Association of Reformed Colleges and Universities, is an affiliate of the International Association for Promotion of Christian Higher Education, as the latter's North American Region. ARIHE's member institutions, all of which belong to the Council for Christian Colleges and Universities, currently include:

- Calvin University (Grand Rapids, Michigan) is affiliated with the Christian Reformed Church in North America.
- Covenant College (Lookout Mountain, Georgia) is affiliated with the Presbyterian Church in America.
- Dordt University (Sioux Center, Iowa) is related to local bodies of the Christian Reformed Church in North America, but exercises a high degree of self-governance.
- Geneva College (Beaver Falls, Pennsylvania) is affiliated with the Reformed Presbyterian Church in North America.
- Institute for Christian Studies (Toronto, Ontario) is an independent Christian graduate school in philosophy. ICS is not a function of either State or Church, but has close relations with members of the Christian Reformed Church who independently join ICS's administering association. Members of many other denominations are also among this core constituency.
- New Saint Andrews College (Moscow, ID) is an independent, classical Christian liberal arts college. Faculty members must be confessionally Reformed and the members of the Board of Trustees must be ministers or elders in the Communion of Reformed Evangelical Churches (CREC).
- Providence Christian College (Ontario, CA) is an independent confessionally Presbyterian and Reformed liberal arts college.
- Redeemer University (Ancaster, Ontario) is an independent Christian undergraduate school with a governing association composed of members from a variety of Reformed denominations.
- The King's University (Edmonton, Alberta) is an independent Christian undergraduate school offering bachelor's degrees. Members of its governing association belong to a variety of Reformed denominations.
- Trinity Christian College (Palos Heights, Illinois) has a close relation to the Christian Reformed Churches in the Chicago metropolitan area.

IAPCHE maintains an office on the campus of Dordt University, and carries IRHE information in its online newsletter. Various ARIHE documents may be downloaded from the Internet in PDF format.

== See also ==
- List of Calvinist educational institutions in North_America
- Association of Presbyterian Colleges and Universities
- List of Lutheran colleges and universities in the United States
- Council for Christian Colleges and Universities
