= Redeemer University =

University in Ontario, Canada

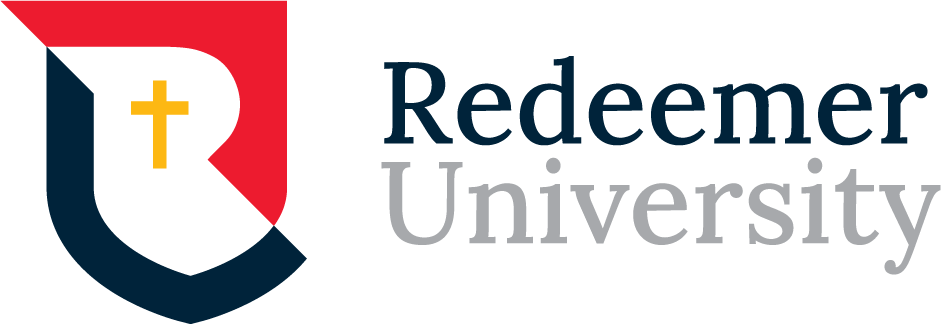
- Motto: Agnus Dei, Omnium Rex
- Type: Private
- Established: 1982
- Religious affiliation: Christian, Reformed
- Academic affiliations: AUCC, CCCU, IAPCHE, ARIHE, CHEC
- Endowment: CA$6.201 million (2023)
- President: David Zietsma
- Faculty: 44 full time + 49 part time
- Undergraduates: 1,147 (As of Fall 2026)
- Location: Hamilton, Ontario, Canada; 43°12′25.81″N 79°56′56.21″W
- Campus: Suburban 90-acre (36 ha) campus
- Sports team: Redeemer Royals
- Colours: Blue & red
- Mascot: Leo the Lion
- Website: www.redeemer.ca

Redeemer University is a private Christian liberal arts and science university located in Hamilton, Ontario, Canada, in the community of Ancaster. Founded in 1982, Redeemer stands in the Reformed Tradition and offers Bachelor of Arts, Bachelor of Education, Bachelor of Business Administration, Bachelor of Science, Bachelor of Health Science, Bachelor of Kinesiology, and Bachelor of Communications and Media Studies degrees. Beginning in fall 2026, the university will offer its first master's degree, a Master of Education.

== History ==
The college opened in 1982 as "Redeemer College", with 97 full-time and 63 part-time students. This number grew to about 250 for the 1985–1986 academic year, the final year classes met in facilities rented from the Board of Education of the City of Hamilton. In 1985 the college purchased 78 acres (32 ha) of land in Ancaster, Ontario for the construction of a new campus. The college occupied the new facilities in August 1986 and admitted 279 full-time students in September. In November 1986, the college held its first graduation, with 40 students graduating.

On June 25, 1998, the Ontario Government passed Bill Pr17, which granted Redeemer College the authority to offer Bachelor of Arts and Bachelor of Science degrees. Prior to that time, the college conferred a Bachelor of Christian Studies degree which was recognized by the AUCC (Association of Universities & Colleges of Canada) as comparable to the Bachelor of Arts or Bachelor of Science degree.

On June 26, 2003, the Ontario Government passed Bill Pr14, granting Redeemer the authority to offer a Bachelor of Education degree to replace its B.C.Ed. degree. On December 10, 2003, the new teacher education (B.Ed.) program was granted initial accreditation by the Ontario College of Teachers, giving Redeemer the only provincially recognized Christian teacher education program (K-10) in Ontario.

In 2005, a considerable expansion to the academic facilities including the addition of the Peter Turkstra Library was completed.

Redeemer University's Arms and Badge were registered with the Canadian Heraldic Authority on September 15, 2005.

In 1989 Redeemer University College established the Forgivable Loan Program. Under this program, parents could donate money to the Redeemer Foundation that the foundation would then loan to their children to cover all or part of their tuition and related costs. If certain minor conditions were met the loan was forgiven at the end of the year. Donors received a charitable donation tax receipt. However, the Canada Revenue Agency ruled that the donations were ineligible for tax deduction since the donors had benefited, and ordered payment of back taxes and interest from donors.

In 2011, 450 parents filed a class action suit against Redeemer to recover the cost of the disallowed donations. A settlement was reached under which the institution gave back 10% of the donations and paid the legal costs of the families.

In February 2019, a $11 million donation allowed Redeemer University to lower tuition to $9800. In early 2020, Redeemer University updated its name, formerly known as Redeemer University College after a review by Ontario's Postsecondary Education Quality Assessment Board. Redeemer currently has legislation before Parliament to receive expanded degree-granting capabilities (25 total degrees), including a Bachelor of Business Administration, a Master of Education, and a Master of Science.

In 2021, the Federal Court ruled that the government had unfairly denied Redeemer University participation in the Canada Summer Jobs Program based solely on its religious opposition to same-sex marriage. In a rare move, the court also ordered the government to pay Redeemer University's full legal costs.

== Programs ==
Redeemer University offers over 35 undergraduate programs and streams.

Bachelor of Arts: Applied Social Sciences (Applied Social Sciences, Social Work), Art, Business (Business, Accounting, Management, Marketing), English (Literature, Writing), Environmental Studies, History, Kinesiology and Physical Education (Kinesiology, Physical Education), Media and Communication Studies (Media Production), Music (Music and Worship), Philosophy, Politics and International Studies (Politics and International Studies, International Development, International Relations), Psychology (Clinical, Experimental), Religion and Theology (Religion and Theology, Urban Ministry, Youth Ministry)

Bachelor of Science: Biochemistry, Biology, Chemistry, Environmental Studies, Health Sciences (Health Sciences, Pre-Medicine), Kinesiology, Mathematics.

Bachelor of Business Administration: Business - Accounting, Business - Management, Business - Marketing

Bachelor of Kinesiology: Kinesiology

Bachelor of Education: Education (Primary/Junior Division, Junior/Intermediate Division)

Bachelor of Communications and Media Studies: Media Production

Bachelor of Health Sciences

Graduate Programs

Redeemer launched its first graduate program, a Master of Education, with applications opening in October 2025 and the program beginning in summer 2026 with a summer residency and online courses.

== Residence ==
Redeemer offers three styles of on-campus residence.

=== Townhouse ===
Incoming students typically live in the Townhouse residences at Redeemer, located at Calvin Court, Luther Court, and Cranmer Court. There are 43 two-storey townhouse residences in all, each with four bedrooms, two bathrooms, a full kitchen, a dining room, a living room, and a basement. Features of a Townhouse residence are a furnished common area, dining/living room, and bedrooms, Wireless and cable Internet access, local telephone access, self-locking doors and campus security patrol of campus 24/7, Residence Advisor or Housing Advisor, porch, coin laundry facilities, and parking space.

=== Augustine Hall ===
Typically, second-year students live in Augustine Hall at Redeemer, located just past the Recreation Centre. A three-storey complex, Augustine Hall is made up of twelve 3-bedroom residences and three 2-bedroom residences. Each 3-bedroom residence includes two bathrooms, a full kitchen, dining room, living room, and an extra storage unit. Up to six students live together in these residences. One of them serves as Housing Advisor (HA) who meets with the Assistant Resident Coordinator in Student Life on a regular basis. The HA ensures everything runs smoothly as students share meals, chores and devotions together.

As of 2015, Augustine Hall has become a senior student residence for third-, fourth- and fifth-year students. The building is overseen by two fellow senior students known as Residence Life Facilitators (RLFs) who plan monthly events and ensures that each apartment is cared for.

=== Independent apartments ===
Independent apartments are available for students with disabilities, married students, mature and senior students. The 23 apartments are located in Luther Court and in Augustine Hall. Some of the features are choice of a one or two bedroom unit, air conditioning, wireless and cable internet access, kitchen appliances, bathroom, parking space, extra storage unit, and coin laundry facilities.

=== Charis Live and Learn Centre ===
A 77,000-square-feet facility that has 35 suites for 170 students, classrooms, and host the new Centre for Innovation and Entrepreneurship.

== Student activities and traditions ==
LAUNCH is a week-long orientation made up of many activities and held for first-years during the first week of school in September. One part of LAUNCH is the LAUNCH Olympics, a day of events where teams of new students and a senior leader play through games, activities, and competitions and end with a mud pit tug-of-war.

The Decade Dance is held on the night of the LAUNCH Olympics; students enjoy music and wear costumes from previous decades, as well as having dance contests.

Spring Banquet is an end-of-the-year event held at a banquet hall in Hamilton, generally in March. There is a sit-down dinner and dance held afterward.

Rooted Worship, previously named Church in the Box (CITB), is a student-run worship service held once a month on Sunday evenings, and includes music and drama as well as a speaker. This tradition began in the school's "black box" but has grown over the years and is now held in the auditorium for students, staff and the community.

Hot Spot is an informal worship event intended for students. Held in the Recreation Centre once a month on Thursday evening; it includes a musician and a singer, and a speaker or speakers.

Chapel is a worship service held in the auditorium on Wednesday mornings for students and faculty which includes student participation in music and readings, while having an in-school or guest speaker.

Redeemer’s Got Talent is a contest where Redeemer students perform to showcase their skills in a Canada's Got Talent style show.

Coffeehouse is a monthly student gathering hosted by Student Senate, either in the Commons or the Rec. Centre, where songs, skits, poetry and other talents are performed.

Spring Retreat is an annual trip for students to attend an overnight camp at Canterbury Hills Camp in Dundas, Ontario.

Hiking Club goes on monthly hikes in the Hamilton area.

== Research and faculty ==
The campus houses two research institutes through the Albert M. Wolters Centre for Christian Scholarship, the Pascal Centre for Advanced Studies in Faith and Science, and The Dooyeweerd Centre for Christian Philosophy.

The Wolters Centre hosts on-campus events throughout the year, including The World and Our Calling Lectures in January.

== Partnerships ==
The university holds membership in the Association of Universities and Colleges of Canada, the Council for Christian Colleges and Universities, the International Association for Promotion of Christian Higher Education, and the Association of Reformed Institutions of Higher Education in North America.

== Athletics ==
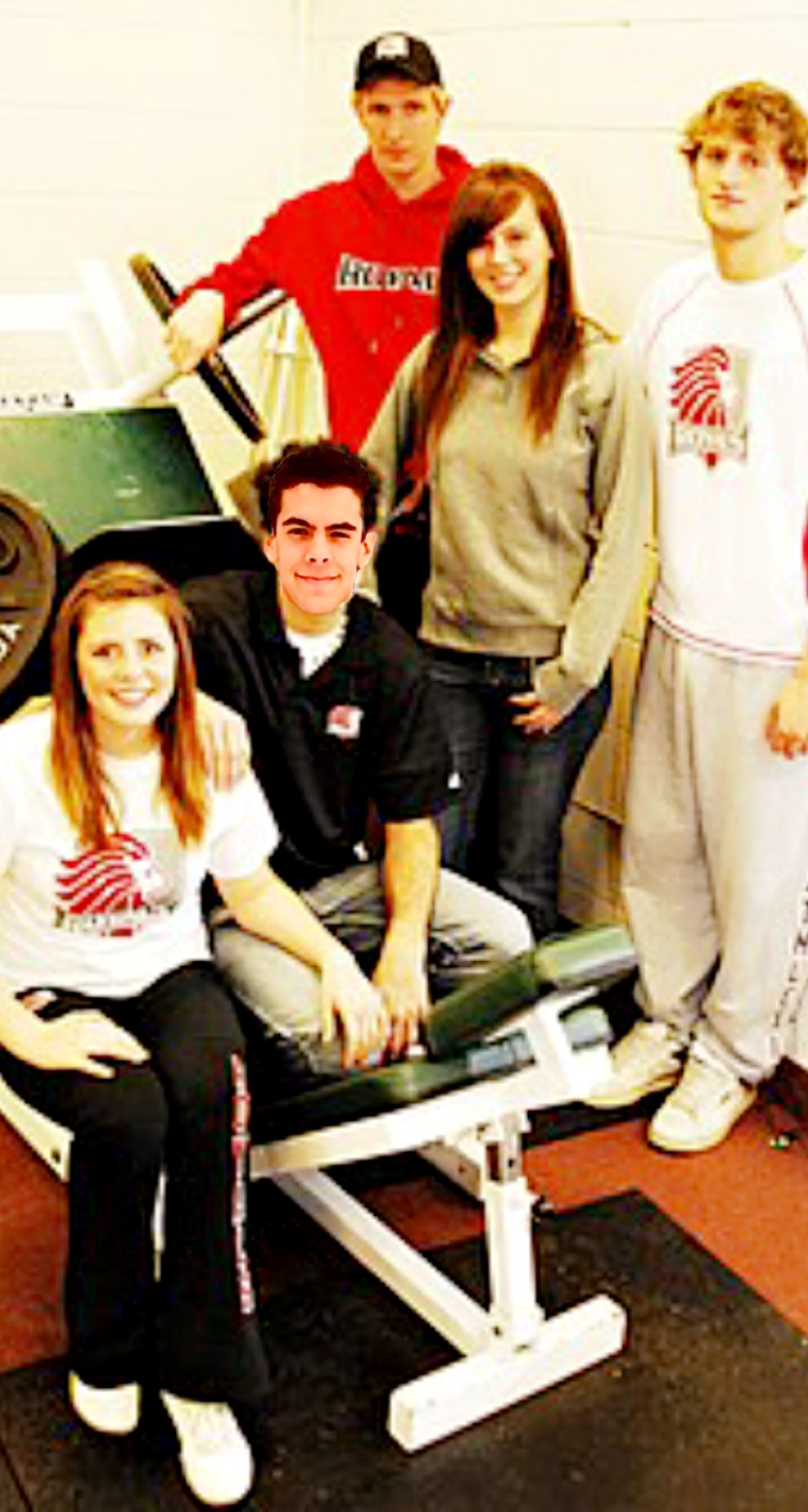
Redeemer University student-athletes

Redeemer Royals fields sports teams across four collegiate affiliations including the Ontario Colleges Athletic Association. The Royals compete in men's and women's varsity basketball, volleyball, and soccer, and have varsity running, disc golf, and powerlifting clubs. They have a men's hockey team in the Upstate New York Club Hockey League.

The Royals have five people inducted into the OCAA hall of fame: Terry Talsma (volleyball and soccer), Ryan Talsma (volleyball), Michelle Van Berkel (volleyball), Colin DeRaaf (volleyball) and John Byl (builder).

Athletic Facilities

Redeemer's Athletic Facilities are open to all students free of charge and also to all athletic centre members. The facilities include one squash court, two lit tennis courts, a soccer field, an indoor soccer dome, a beach volleyball sand court, a lit outdoor basketball court, a double-sized hardwood gymnasium, and a workout studio/fitness centre. In September 2011, Redeemer, in conjunction with the Ancaster Soccer Club, opened a new sports complex, featuring an outdoor, artificial-turfed field, and a 10 x 70 meter domed sports field, with an adjoining field house.

== Notable alumni ==
- Alissa Golob - pro-life activist
- Alex Nuttall - Mayor of Barrie, Ontario and former MP for Barrie—Springwater—Oro-Medonte

== See also ==
- Education in Ontario
- List of Ontario Universities
- List of colleges and universities named after people
- Ontario Student Assistance Program
