= Chaika Open Air (festival) =

Ukrainian open-air rock music festival

- Genre: Rock, punk rock, metal, alternative rock, pop, hip hop, electronic
- Dates: Late May – early June
- Locations: Kyiv, Ukraine
- Years active: 2000s
- Website: chaikaopenair.com

Chaika Open Air (Ukrainian: Чайка Open Air) is a Ukrainian open‑air rock music festival founded by promoter Yaroslav Bystrushkin, who serves as the festival’s president. The festival has usually been held in Kyiv or its suburbs in late spring or early summer and has combined performances by Ukrainian and international rock and alternative acts.

== History ==
Chaika Open Air was launched in the early 2000s as an open‑air music festival associated with the Chaika sports and aviation complex on the outskirts of Kyiv. In its first years some editions were timed to coincide with Kyiv City Day, while later events were linked to Ukraine’s Independence Day celebrations.

From 2000 to 2009 concerts took place at several large venues in Kyiv, including the Expocenter of Ukraine, the CSKA Stadium, the airfield of the Chaika sports complex and the Kyiv Palace of Sports. Over that period the festival hosted around 200 bands and performers from Ukraine, Russia, Belarus and other countries, with international guests from the United Kingdom, Italy, Germany, Greece and the United States.

Although primarily focused on rock and metal, the line‑ups have also featured rap, pop and electronic music acts. Ukrainian commentators have compared the festival’s format to large Central and Eastern European open‑air rock festivals.

== Format and staging ==
In addition to its main stage, Chaika Open Air later introduced a campsite on the festival grounds to accommodate visitors. From 2007 the festival operated two stages in parallel: a main stage for headlining acts and a separate “young talents” stage for emerging bands.

In 2009 the programme was expanded with a night segment that included DJ sets and laser shows, alongside extensive use of smoke, lighting effects and pyrotechnics. Technical support for the festival and the design of the main stage were provided by the Kyiv‑based company Ukrainian National Show Exchange (Українська національна шоу-біржа), led by stage designer Andrii Kozelkov.

Some critics and commentators expressed concern about the promotion of “unhealthy” or “immoral” lifestyles at the festival and drew attention to the relatively small share of Ukrainian‑language content in certain years’ line‑ups.

== Notable editions ==
=== 23 May 2004 – Kyiv Palace of Sports ===
One of the better‑documented early editions took place on 23 May 2004 at the Kyiv Palace of Sports. The programme featured Ukrainian and Russian rock, pop and hip hop acts, including 5'nizza, Boombox, Linda, Nochnye Snaipery, Okean Elzy, Splean and Chaif. Contemporary reports described the event as commercially unsuccessful, noting that the Palace of Sports was only half full.

=== 9 June 2007 – Expocenter of Ukraine ===
On 9 June 2007 Chaika Open Air was held at the Expocenter of Ukraine with two stages in operation.

The main stage included performances by Ukrainian bands such as TOL, Tartak and Dymna Sumish, Russian acts including Delfin, Vyacheslav Butusov with Yu‑Piter and Leningrad, and the Scottish punk band The Exploited, which was making its first appearance in Ukraine. The “young talents” stage hosted a range of emerging rock and punk bands from Ukraine and Russia.

According to press coverage, the 2007 edition attracted around 30,000 visitors and was marked by some clashes between youth subcultural groups in the audience.

=== 10th anniversary festival – Chaika airfield ===
A two‑day 10th anniversary festival was held on 7–8 June at the airfield of the Chaika sports complex outside Kyiv. The main stage featured international and regional headliners such as Finnish gothic rock band The 69 Eyes, British grindcore group Napalm Death, Russian acts including Splean, Korol i Shut, Agatha Christie and Amatory, and Ukrainian bands including Boombox, Esthetic Education, TOL and Krykhitka Tsakhes.

The youth stage presented a large number of bands from Kyiv, other Ukrainian cities and neighbouring countries such as Moldova. Estimates in the Ukrainian press suggested that up to 70,000 spectators attended the two‑day event.

=== Later editions ===
Subsequent editions at the Chaika airfield continued to combine Ukrainian rock, punk and metal acts with international guests. One of the later large‑scale festivals featured bands such as Boombox, Braty Hadiukiny, Vopli Vidopliasova, Mumiy Troll, Alisa, Delfin, German glam rock group Cinema Bizarre, Greek death metal band Septic Flesh and American metal band DevilDriver.

Alongside the main programme, a youth stage presented numerous emerging bands from Ukrainian cities such as Luhansk, Mykolaiv, Dnipro and Khmelnytskyi, as well as from Italy, Moldova, Estonia and Russia; a separate night programme offered DJ sets and electronic music. Total attendance, including the night segment, was again estimated at around 70,000 people, and the edition was noted for including one of the last major performances by Braty Hadiukiny frontman Serhii Kuzminskyi.
