= Alissa Golob =

Canadian anti-abortion activist

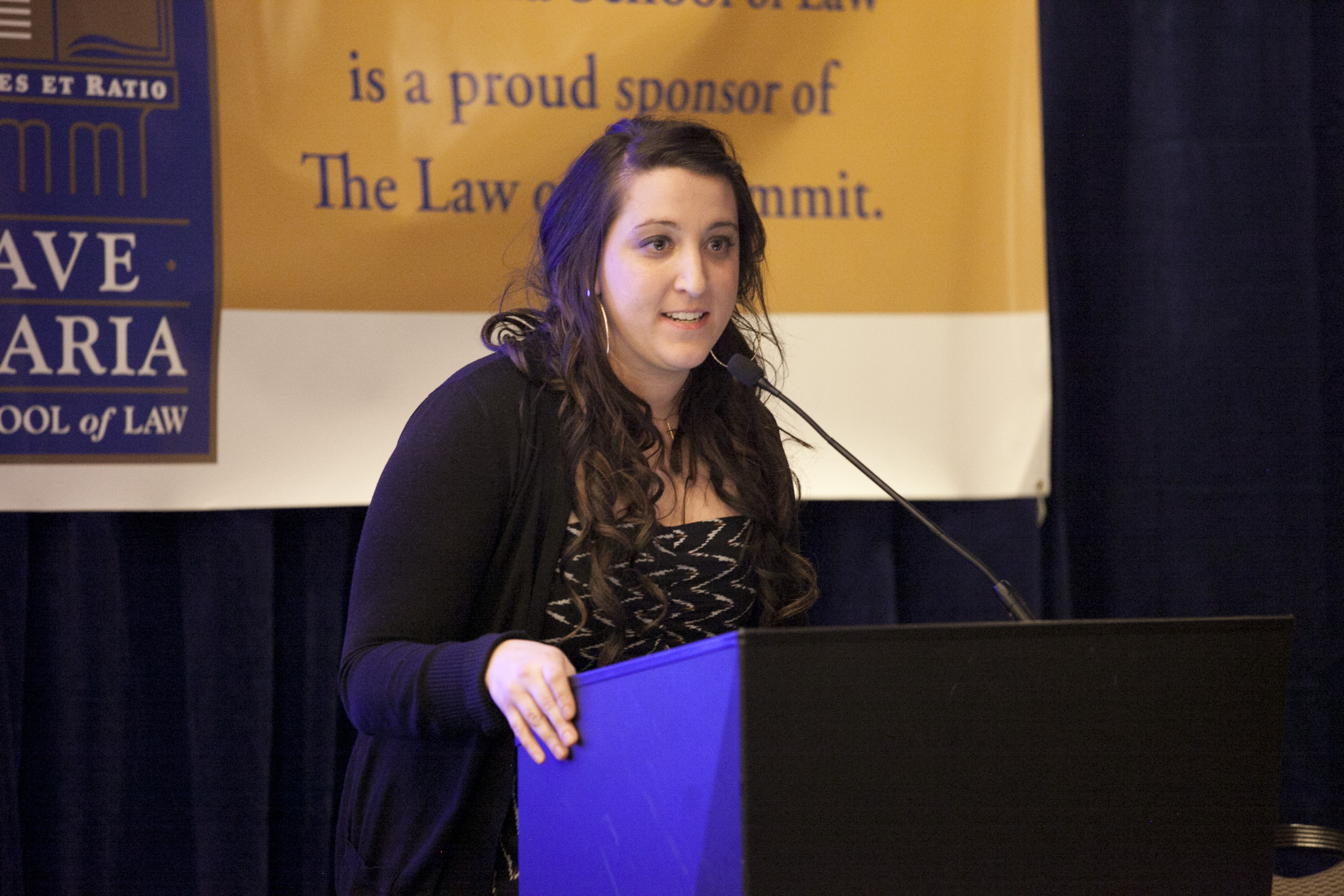
Alissa Golob at the 2014 Law of Life Summit.

Alissa Golob is a Canadian pro-life activist, and co-founder of RightNow, a political group that aids in electing pro-life candidates in local nomination elections.

== Personal life ==
Golob was born and raised in Sarnia, Ontario, the oldest of nine children.

Golob's mother was pregnant with her as a teenager, and nearly chose to have an abortion, but changed her mind against her doctor's advice.

As a young teenager, Golob saw a photograph of an aborted fetus, and was determined to participate in the Canadian anti-abortion movement. In addition to her activism, she volunteers with Big Brothers Big Sisters and Out of the Cold.

In 2009, she graduated from Redeemer University College with a bachelor's degree in General Studies and Humanities.

Golob married her husband in 2020, and has three children.

== Professional career ==
From 2010 to 2016, Golob worked as Youth Coordinator and Elections Team Member at Campaign Life Coalition.

She was an organizer for the Canadian March for Life, and Campaign Life Coalition's Defund Abortion campaign; which sought to remove abortion services from provincial funding.

In 2015, she led the #No2Trudeau campaign, a joint effort of Campaign Life Coalition and the Canadian Centre for Bio-Ethical Reform, which criticized then-politician Justin Trudeau's abortion stance. The campaign attracted significant attention during the 2015 Canadian federal election.

She has been interviewed by the CBC, CTV, The Huffington Post, Toronto Star, MTV and other outlets.

She has received "violent hate mail" as a result of her activism, but noted that she is sympathetic to the authors because "they are often reaching out from the pain they have internalized following an abortion."

In 2013, she appeared at the United Nations for the 57th Commission on the Status of Women with an anti-abortion delegation.

In 2016, Golob publicly left Campaign Life Coalition, citing that "a void in the pro-life movement needed to be filled" and "I was stuck in a self-perpetuating organization with no political successes under their belt in the last two decades."

Later that year, she co-founded the political organization RightNow with her business partner Scott Hayward.

Golob took an active role in the 2017 Conservative Party of Canada leadership race, endorsing Andrew Scheer, Brad Trost and Pierre Lemieux.

She also took part in the 2020 Conservative Party of Canada leadership race, endorsing Leslyn Lewis and Derek Sloan.

Golob's organization endorsed Leslyn Lewis in the 2022 Conservative Party of Canada leadership election.
