= The Magic Behind the Voices =

Book by Tim Lawson and Alisa Persons

The Magic Behind the Voices: A Who's Who of Cartoon Voice Actors
- Author: Tim Lawson, Alisa Persons
- Language: English
- Genre: Non-fiction
- Publisher: University Press of Mississippi
- Publication date: December 2004
- Publication place: United States
- Pages: 367
- ISBN: 1-578-06696-4

The Magic Behind the Voices: A Who's Who of Cartoon Voice Actors (ISBN 1-578-06696-4) is a 367-page book by Tim Lawson and Alisa Persons, chronicling the artistic achievements and history of cartoon voice actors from the past and the present.

It was published by the University Press of Mississippi in December 2004.

== Summary ==
Drawn from dozens of personal interviews, the book features various biographies, anecdotes, credit listings, and photographs pertaining to thirty-nine of the hidden artists of show business. The featured biographies span many animation studios and production companies, and discuss many details about well-known and distinguished voice actors, such as Beavis and Butt-Head and King of the Hill creator and lead voice artist Mike Judge, who got his start as an engineer for a weapons contractor); Bart Simpson's voice actress Nancy Cartwright, an Ohio native who became the star protégé of Daws Butler (voice artist for Yogi Bear, Huckleberry Hound, and Quick Draw McGraw); and Wayne Allwine and Russi Taylor, the real-life husband-and-wife duo who, at the time of this book's publication, were the current voice actors for Mickey and Minnie Mouse, respectively.

== List of voice actors discussed in this book ==
- Charlie Adler (voice of Buster Bunny on Tiny Toons and Cow and Chicken)
- Dayton Allen (original voice of Heckle and Jeckle)
- Wayne Allwine (one of Mickey Mouse's many voice actors)
- Jackson Beck (the original voice of Popeye's Bluto)
- Mary Kay Bergman (a Snow White voice actor who also voiced lots of South Park characters)
- Mel Blanc (the original voice of the Looney Tunes characters, and various Hanna-Barbera characters as well)
- Daws Butler (the original voice of Yogi Bear, Huckleberry Hound, Quick Draw McGraw, Captain Crunch, and more)
- Nancy Cartwright (the voice of Bart Simpson and various other Simpsons characters)
- Adriana Caselotti (the original voice of Snow White)
- Dan Castellaneta (the voice of Homer Simpson, Megavolt, and Earthworm Jim)
- Art Clokey (the creator of Gumby who voiced the horse Pokey)
- Townsend Coleman (the voice of The Tick and the animated Gobo Fraggle)
- Wally Cox (the voice of Underdog)
- Jim Cummings (the current voice for Winnie the Pooh, Tigger, and Taz, and the voice of Darkwing Duck)
- E.G. Daily (the voice of Buttercup from the Powerpuff Girls, and Tommy from the Rugrats)
- Nicole David (the original voice of Scooby-Doo's Velma)
- June Foray (the voice of Rocky the Squirrel, Jokey Smurf, and the main female voice for the classic Looney Tunes cartoons)
- Paul Frees (the original voice of Boris Badenov, Ludwig von Drake, and Toucan Sam)
- Sterling Holloway (the original voice of many similar sounding Disney characters like Winnie the Pooh)
- Mike Judge (the voice and creator of Beavis and Butt-Head)
- Tom Kenny (the voice of SpongeBob SquarePants and various other Cartoon Network and Nickelodeon characters)
- John Kricfalusi (the creator of Ren and Stimpy, and the original voice of Ren)
- Maurice LaMarche (the voice of the Brain from Animaniacs)
- Norma Macmillan (the original voice of Casper the Friendly Ghost)
- Bob McFadden (the voice of lots of Frankenstein monsters, like Milton the Monster and Frankenberry)
- Jack Mercer (the original voice of Popeye and Felix the Cat)
- Don Messick (the original voice of Scooby-Doo, Boo-Boo Bear, Papa Smurf, Astro Jetson, and many more for Hanna-Barbera]
- George O'Hanlon (the original voice of George Jetson)
- Rob Paulsen (the voice of Yakko Warner and Pinky on Animaniacs)
- Mae Questel (the original voice of Betty Boop and Popeye's Olive Oyl)
- Alan Reed (the original voice of Fred Flintstone)
- Chris Sarandon (the voice of Jack Skellington from The Nightmare Before Christmas)
- Bill Scott (the original voice of Bullwinkle the Moose and a writer for Rocky and Bullwinkle as well)
- Kath Soucie (the voice of Fifi Le Fume from Tiny Toons and various Rugrats characters)
- Jean Vander Pyl (the original voice of Wilma Flintstone)
- Janet Waldo (the voice of Judy Jetson and various other Hanna-Barbera ladies)
- Frank Welker (the voice of various Hanna-Barbera, Animaniacs, Tiny Toons, Muppet Babies, Garfield and Friends, and animal sound characters)
- Billy West (the voice of Ren and Stimpy, various Futurama characters, and a new Bugs Bunny voice as well)
- Paul Winchell (a puppeteer who was the original voice of Tigger and Gargamel)

== Background ==
In the earliest days of cartoons, voice actors were seldom credited for their work, and prior to 1990, voice actors' potential as real actors was overlooked even by the Screen Actors Guild, with Mel Blanc, the so-named "Man of 1,000 Voices", being the only voice actor known to the general public.

Oscar-winning celebrities clamor to guest star on animated television shows and features (often to the displeasure of dedicated voice actors such as Billy West); however, despite the crushing turnouts at signings for such television series as Animaniacs, The Simpsons, and SpongeBob SquarePants, most voice actors, even in 21st-century animation, continue to work in relative anonymity.

== See also ==
- I Know That Voice, the 2013 documentary about famous voice actors
