= Alyssa (disambiguation) =

Alyssa is a female given name.

Alyssa may also refer to:

- Alyssa (album), a 1989 album by Alyssa Milano
- Dido, Queen of Carthage in Greco-Roman stories, also referred to as Elissa or Alyssa
- Alyssa Lloyd, protagonists of The Demolitionist
- Alissa White-Gluz, Canadian heavy metal vocalist
- Alyssa, cantata by Raoul Laparra for which in 1903 he was awarded the Premier Grand Prix de Rome

== See also ==
- Alisa (disambiguation)
- Alissa (given name)
