= Arisa (disambiguation) =

Arisa (born 1982) is an Italian singer.

Arisa may also refer to:

- Arisa (given name), a feminine given name
- Arisa (manga), a Japanese manga series
- Arisa (album), a 1991 album by Arisa Mizuki
- Arisa Station, a railway station in Yatsushiro, Kumamoto, Japan
- Arisa River, a river of Venezuela
- ARISA, a molecular biology technique

== See also ==
- Alisa (disambiguation)
