= Ailsa (name) =

Ailsa is a feminine given name, not to be confused with Alisa. Notable people with the name include:

- Ailsa Berk, British actress
- Ailsa Mellon Bruce (1901–1969), American art collector
- Ailsa Carmichael, Lady Carmichael (born 1969), Scottish advocate and judge
- Ailsa Chang (born 1976), American journalist
- Ailsa McGown Clark (1926–2014), British zoologist
- Ailsa Craig (journalist) (1917–2012), Australian journalist
- Ailsa Garland (1917–1982), British journalist
- Ailsa Hughes (born 1991), Irish rugby player
- Ailsa Keating, British mathematician
- Ailsa Land (1927–2021), English professor
- Ailsa Lister (born 2004), Scottish cricketer
- Ailsa Magnus (born 1967), Scottish sculptor
- Ailsa Mainman, British archaeologist and ceramics specialist
- Ailsa Maxwell (1922–2020), British code breaker and historian
- Ailsa McGilvary, New Zealand bird conservationist and photographer
- Ailsa McKay (1963–2014), Scottish economist
- Ailsa O'Connor (1921–1980), Australian artist and sculptor
- Ailsa Piper (born 1959), Australian actress, director and performer
- Ailsa A. Welch (born 1956), British scientist

== Fictional characters ==
- Ailsa Paige, fictional character from the novel Ailsa Paige by Robert W. Chambers
- Ailsa Stewart, fictional character from Home and Away

== See also ==
- Marquess of Ailsa, title in the Peerage of the United Kingdom created in 1831
