= Abort67 =

UK anti-abortion organisation

Abort67 is an anti-abortion educational organisation in the UK known for using methods such as demonstrating in public places, speaking to people who stop to engage and displaying graphic images of aborted fetuses. The group was founded by Kathryn Attwood and Andrew Stephenson in January 2012, both former directors of the Centre for Bio-Ethical Reform UK.

== Beliefs ==
Kathryn Attwood, director of Abort67, said that she 'disagrees with all abortions' when speaking on a BBC Newsnight debate on the issue. Abort67 is not a religious organisation, it is a project of Centre for Bio-Ethical Reform UK which in the early days shared some administration with CCFON which is the company name of Christian Concern. The Abort67 demonstrations are also often fronted by Aisling Hubert, full-time head of training for anti-abortion organisation the Centre for Bio-Ethical Reform UK (the parent company of Abort67), who has been frequently linked with Evangelical pressure group Christian Concern.

== Methods ==
Abort67 are known for holding educational displays using graphic images of living and aborted fetuses in public spaces and in the vicinity of but not at the entrance of abortion clinics, speaking to people who choose to stop and engage and offering help to any women looking for an alternative to abortion. It has been reported that they have filmed clinic users and followed women down the street. CBR UK state "As Abort67 have always recorded themselves at every public education display, in the public square or in the vicinity of an abortion clinic (never held at the clinic entrance) such libelous claims are easily refuted with evidence that counters such claims."

== Opposition ==
There is frequent opposition to the graphic demonstrations of Abort67.

Students at University of Sussex staged a 'Cover Up Project' in opposition to an Abort67 demonstration at the university campus in December 2012. Students gathered in front of the protesters in an attempt to shield other members of the public from the images. This followed students reporting that they had been left "distressed and intimidated" by images displayed in the demonstration. CBR UK stated "Note that it is the images, not the conduct of Abort67 volunteers that garner these complaints. Images cannot 'intimidate', though indeed, abortion when seen is distressing as were the images of tortured slaves used by the Abolitionists that led to the outlawing of the Transatlantic Slave Trade in the past. CBR UK state that until an injustice is exposed graphically, nothing will change. This is the lesson that Abort67 learned from studying how so many injustices of the past were ended."

In December 2014 a video of a young pregnant woman arguing with Abort67 demonstrators, saying that they are wrong to protest outside a health center, caught the attention of many Twitter users including high-profile personalities such as Caitlin Moran, who called the woman 'Hero of the year'. The health centre had recently rented rooms out to the British Pregnancy Advisory Service.

In response to Abort67 displaying graphic posters outside Tynwald parliament in the Isle of Man in 2017, a petition was launched to stop anti-abortion campaigners displaying images of unborn fetuses outside public buildings. Many residents also voiced their anger and distress at seeing the images via Facebook.

An Abort67 display in Canterbury in June 2017 was met by a counter-protest against it. The graphic anti-abortion demonstration was reported to police and provoked comments from residents such as "I'm disgusted by this. It's intimidating and it's vulgar. Young kids are going to walk past - it's not right," and "It's a complete misrepresentation of motherhood. It's saying you're a bad person for having an abortion. It's disengaging people from society."

It was reported that an Abort67 display outside the Parkinson Building of University of Leeds in December 2017 had more opposition than support following the creation of a Facebook event inviting people to a counter protest at the scene.

In January 2018 the group were told to move their protest so it could not be seen from the children's ward at Noble's Hospital in Douglas on the Isle of Man. The demonstration was targeting healthcare staff on a training course at the adjacent Keyll Darree facility. Concerns were raised on social media over the protest's proximity to patients and the nearby children's ward.

== Funding ==
Critics of Abort67 claimed without any evidence that they received funding from abroad.

CBR UK state that while they are affiliated with CBR in the United States, they are in no way funded by them. Funds are raised through individuals who believe in the aims of their work, which is to make abortion unthinkable, to offer support to those facing a crisis pregnancy and to help anyone affected by a past abortion to find healing. They say that a number of their volunteers and supporters are themselves people who have had an abortion or have someone close to them who lost a child in an abortion.

Abort67, a project of CBR UK, were wound up in 2019 to integrate all their work under the banner of CBR UK. Info on their work can be found on their website.

It has been reported in the media that Abort67 has links to American organisations.
