= Skattaboe Block =

- U.S. National Register of Historic Places
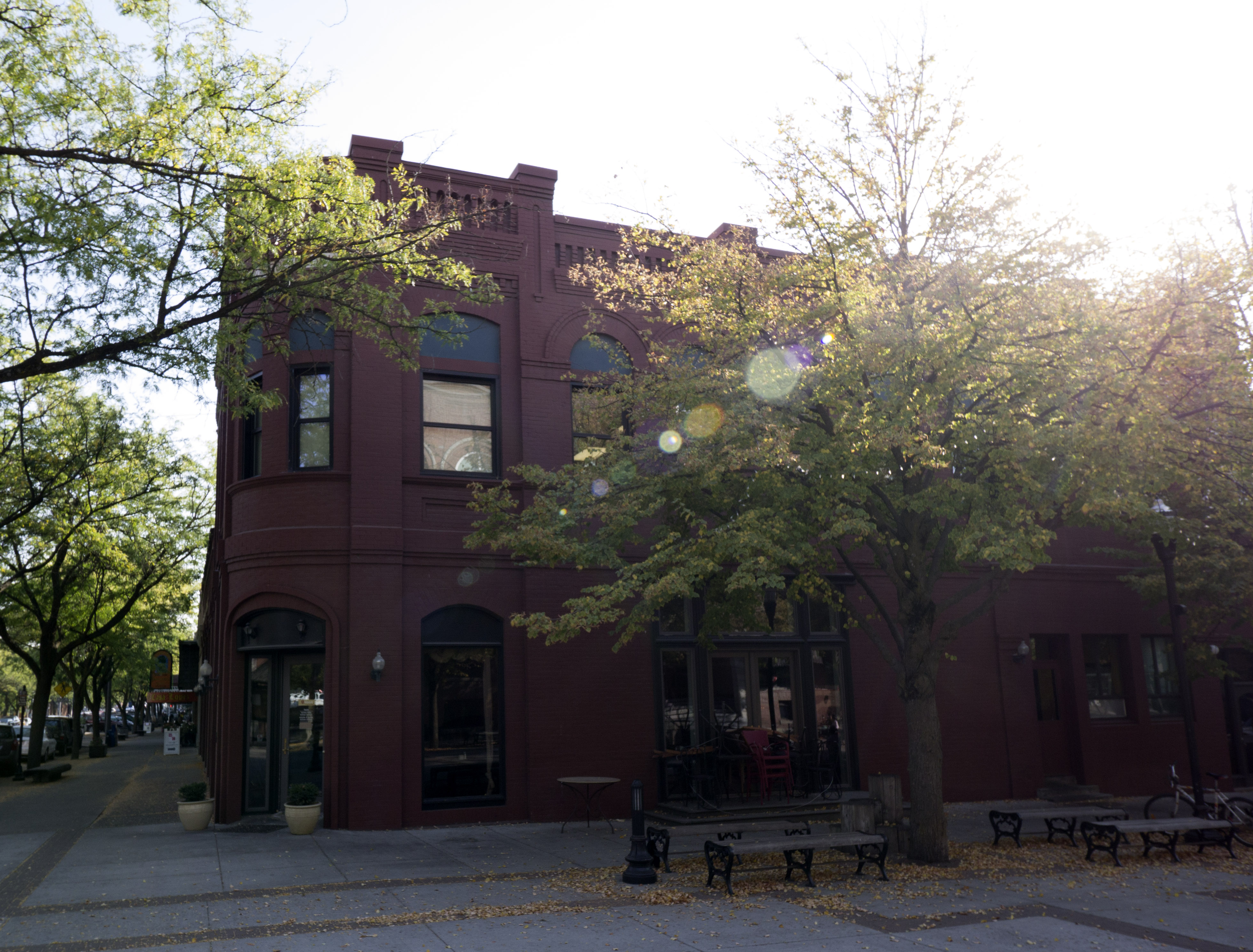
- The building in 2012

- Location within Idaho Location within the United States
- Location: Main and 4th Streets, Moscow, Idaho
- Coordinates: 46°43′53″N 117°00′03″W
- Area: less than one acre
- Built: 1892
- Built by: Taylor & Lauder
- Architectural style: Romanesque
- NRHP reference No.: 78001077
- Added to NRHP: May 22, 1978

The Skattaboe Block is a historic building in Moscow, Idaho. It was built by Taylor & Lauder for the Moscow Telephone and Telegraph Company in 1892. It was owned by the Inland Telephone Company from 1925 to 1952, when it was purchased by the General Telephone Company. It currently houses New Saint Andrews College.

The building was designed in the Romanesque Revival architectural style. Due to a fire in 1966 the building was renovated in 1978, but the original design of the building has been preserved. It has been listed on the National Register of Historic Places since May 22, 1978.
