= Center for Bio-Ethical Reform =

US non-profit organization

The Center for Bio-Ethical Reform (CBR) is an American anti-abortion organization. The Executive Director of the CBR is Gregg Cunningham, a former Republican member of the Pennsylvania House of Representatives who has also held a number of other government positions. He was a member of the Reagan administration.

== Activities ==
CBR projects include the Reproductive "Choice" Campaign, the Genocide Awareness Project, Matthew 28:20, and the AbortionNO web site.

The CBR has compared Nazi genocide and lynching victims to aborted fetuses, in the context of its Genocide Awareness Project. Shopping mall owners in California attempted to prohibit their "grisly or gruesome displays", but the California Supreme Court upheld the Center's constitutional right to free speech and political activities in such public places.

The Guardian describes a group called Abort67, "whose parent organisation is the Center for Bio-Ethical Reform, which is run by an ex-Republican politician who has come over to train their activists".

In 2019 the UK affiliate of CBR targeted Labour MP and women's rights campaigner Stella Creasy, who was pregnant, by advertising on billboards and leafleting in her constituency. The material depicted a fetus, and prompted hundreds of complaints. The advertising agency responsible for the billboards apologised, conceding that they should have monitored the content more closely, and they removed the posters Campaigning in the UK has been done under the banner of Abort67, a project of the Centre for Bio-Ethical Reform UK, which was founded as a company in 2010. The Centre claimed at least £29,000 in gift aid, according to its accounts, prompting the BBC and the Charity Commission to investigate their charity status.

The group's Irish branch campaigned against the legalization of abortion in Ireland.

== Graphic images ==
The CBR advocates displaying graphic pictures of aborted fetuses, as well as the dead bodies of Holocaust and lynching victims. During their protest at Liberty University and The College of William and Mary, the group was condemned by anti-abortion organizations on campus, who consider the group's tactics and messages to be neither helpful nor appropriate.

== Genocide Awareness Project ==
The Genocide Awareness Project is a movable display which has been temporarily installed on multiple university campuses in the United States and Canada since 1997. The display includes pictures which they say depict aborted fetuses or represent what an aborted fetus would look like, juxtaposed with images of genocide victims. In 2001, the display was mounted on trucks and driven around San Francisco Bay Area. This approach was also used earlier in Florida, Michigan, Ohio, Indiana, Kentucky, and the Los Angeles area.

At the University of Maryland, over 500 students signed the petition "I Am Insulted by the Exploitation of the Holocaust for Political Gain".

== Leadership ==
According to Charity Navigator, 6.76%, or $66,440, of the group's expenses goes to compensating secretary Gregg Cunningham.

== See also ==
- Abortion
- Abortion rights movement
- Anti-abortion movement
- Canadian Centre for Bio-Ethical Reform
