= Alissa Chavez =

American inventor and entrepreneur

Alissa Marie Chavez is an American inventor and entrepreneur. She is known for her invention "Hot Seat", an alarm for child car seats being left occupied, which she invented as a teenager. She is the founder and CEO of the company Assila.

== Early life ==
Chavez was born in 1997 and raised in Albuquerque, New Mexico, by her single mother, a childcare owner. She has always had a passion for working with children. The children she has worked with have been her inspiration behind her children's products.

== Invention ==
At age 14, Chavez conceived the Hot Seat alarm as a science fair project, after hearing that many babies died from being left in cars. She later refined the idea and patented it, helping people with newborn care. The invention by Alissa Chavez aims to reduce the chance that a child will die in an overheated car.

Alissa worked with engineers to perfect the hot seat and raised money on a site named "Indiegogo" to develop a prototype so it could be manufactured. The hot seat consists of a pad that can sense if a child is in the car and communicates wirelessly with a fob attached to a parent's key chain. If the parent walks more than 10 meters away without the child, it will trigger the fob, the parent's smartphone through the app, and the car itself. Alissa raised enough money on "Indiegogo" to build a prototype that manufacturers can use to mass produce the product. The reason Chavez wanted to create this product to help kids is because her mother runs a home daycare, so she was affected by stories about children dying in hot vehicles after being forgotten by accident. Alissa released her second product in the spring of 2019. In 2019 she announced a new invention, a baby bottle that stores water and dried formula separately, for mixing when needed.

Alissa started her own company called Assila LLC. Assila is her name backward, which was inspired by Oprah's "Harpo." She started her company at age 14 after hearing the many tragic stories of children dying from being accidentally left in hot vehicles.

== Accomplishments ==
Following the invention of the hot seat, Alissa gained a lot of media attention appearing on national and international TV and radio shows including, the Today Show, Ryan Seacrest Radio Show, NBC News, ABC News, Fox and Friends, Huffington Post, Washington Post, and USA Today. She was also named one of Glamour Magazine's "Woman of the Year: Hometown Heroes." She has also spoken at TEDx events, Microsoft digital camp, school events, and fundraisers. Alissa Chavez has multiple other accomplishments such as being featured in the book Girls Think of Everything by Catherine Thimmesh. She's also won many awards: Future Founders U. Pitch 3rd Place Winner, Future Founders U. Pitch Semifinalist, Univision Premios Juventud, 40 Under 40 Albuquerque Business First, University of New Mexico Rainforest Pitch Competition Winner, Gold American Business Award, Tech Startup of the Year, Silver American Business Award, Tech Startup of the Year, Hardware, Bronze American Business Award, Tech Startup of the Year, Software, New Mexico Small Business Success Story presented by Sandia National Labs, Innovation New Mexico Honoree, Glamour Magazine Women of the Year Tech Heroes, Glamour Magazine Women of the Year Hometown Heroes, Good Samaritan Award from Mayor Richard Berry of Albuquerque, New Mexico, Excellence Award” Albuquerque Public School District.

== Education ==
Alissa Chavez also attended The University of New Mexico. She graduated with a bachelor's degree of Arts - BA, Communication receiving this degree in May 2020. She also received a master's degree in Public Administration in the year 2022. With these years of education, Alissa was also able to get 21 endorsements under Management and another 21 endorsements under Project Management to help get her inventions into mass production to produce as many as possible. She was also able to gain skills in strategic planning, Microsoft Office, social media, photoshop, marketing, customer service, patents, television, radio, advertising, and lastly, graphic design.
