= Arisa (given name) =

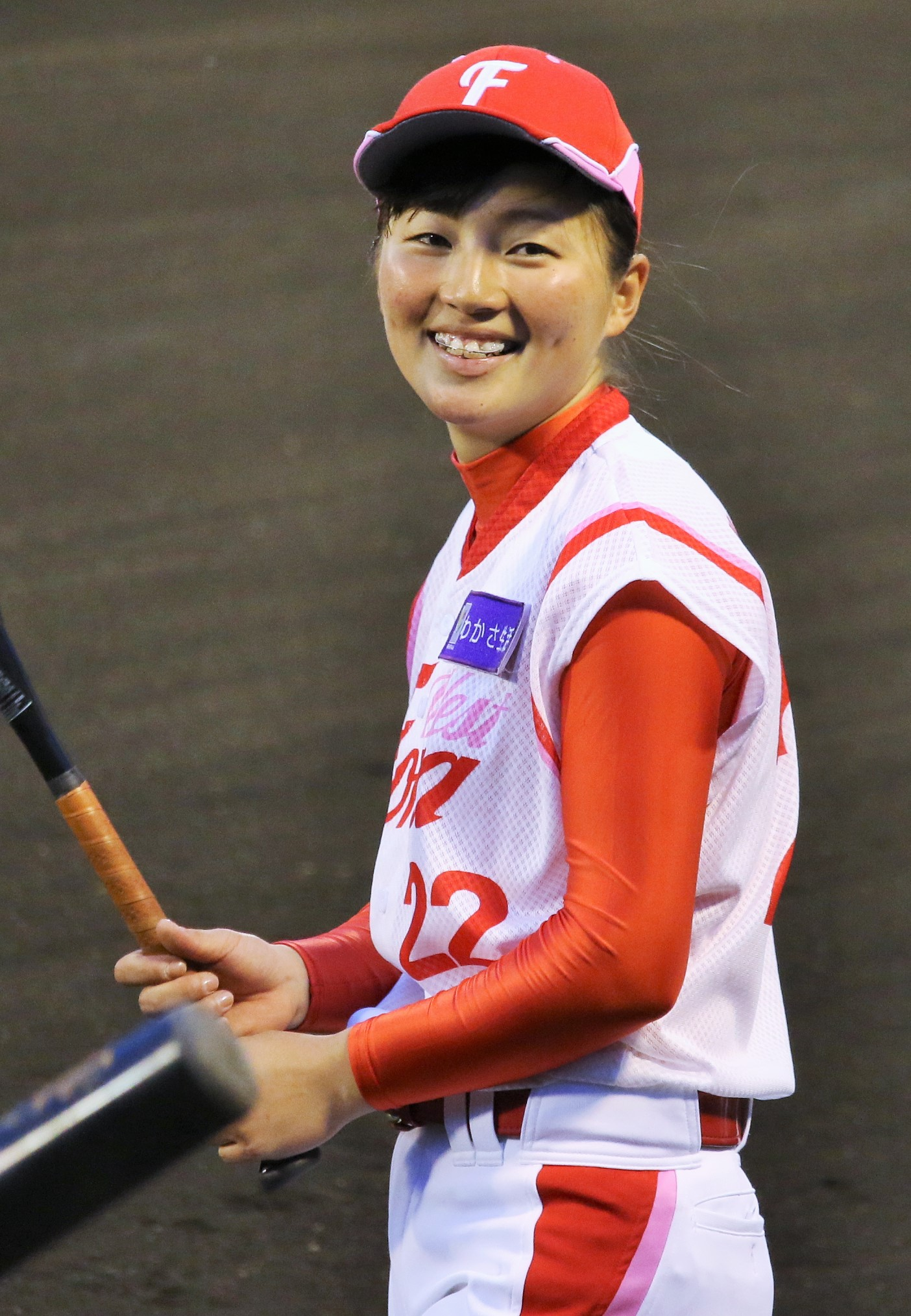
- Arisa Kanayama, Japanese women's baseball player
- Pronunciation: aɾisa (IPA)
- Gender: Female

Origin
- Origin: Japanese
- Meaning: Different meanings depending on the kanji used

Arisa is a feminine Japanese given name.

== Written forms ==
Arisa can be written using many different combinations of kanji characters. Here are some examples:

- 有紗, "have, thin silk"
- 有沙, "have, sand"
- 愛里沙, "love, village, sand"
- 愛里咲, "love, village, bloom"
- 愛理沙, "love, logic, sand"
- 亜里砂, "Asia, village, sand"
- 亜莉茶, "Asia, jasmine, tea"
- 亜璃瑳, "Asia, glassy, lustrous"
- 安里紗, "tranquil, village, sand"

The name can also be written in hiragana ありさ or katakana アリサ.

== Japanese people with the name ==
- Arisa Andō (安藤 ありさ; born 1961), Japanese voice actress
- Arisa Date (伊達 朱里紗; born 1991), Japanese voice actress
- Arisa Go (郷 亜里砂; born 1987), Japanese Olympian speed skater
- Arisa Hayashi (林 有沙; born 2010), Japanese rock climber
- Arisa Hoshiki (星輝 ありさ; born 1995), Japanese professional wrestler
- Arisa Igarashi (五十嵐 有紗; born 1996), Japanese badminton player
- Arisa Inoue (井上 愛里沙; born 1995), Japanese volleyball player
- Arisa Kimishima (君嶋 愛梨沙; born 1995), Japanese bobsledder and sprinter
- Arisa Komiya (小宮 有紗; born 1994), Japanese actress
- Arisa Kanayama (金山 亜莉紗; born 1994), Japanese women's baseball player
- Arisa Kotani (小谷 有理沙; born 2000), Japanese curler
- Arisa Matsubara (松原 有沙; born 1995), Japanese women's footballer
- Arisa Minamino (南野 亜里沙; born 1991), Japanese footballer
- Arisa Mochizuki (望月 ありさ; born 1994), Japanese professional footballer
- Arisa Murata (村田 愛里咲; born 1990), Japanese freestyle skier
- Arisa Nakagawa (中川 愛理沙), Japanese beauty pageant winner
- Arisa Nakajima (中島 安里紗; born 1989), Japanese professional wrestler
- Arisa Nishi (born 2004), Japanese rugby union and sevens player
- Arisa Noto (能登 有沙; born 1988), Japanese voice actress and singer
- Arisa Ogasawara (小笠原 亜里沙; born 1980), Japanese actress and voice actress
- Arisa Ōwaki (大脇 有紗; born 1999), Japanese former member of the SKE48
- Arisa Sakurai (桜井 愛莉咲; born 2003), Japanese member of the SKE48
- Arisa Sato (model) (佐藤 ありさ; born 1988), Japanese model and weathercaster
- Arisa Satō (佐藤 あり紗; born 1989), Japanese volleyball player
- Arisa Shinose (しのせ 愛梨紗; born 2005), Japanese professional wrestler
- Arisa Sugi (杉 ありさ; born 1989), Japanese actress
- Arisa Takada (高田 ありさ; born 1987), Japanese volleyball player
- Arisa Tsubata (津端 ありさ; born 1993), Japanese boxer

== Other people including people of Japanese descent ==
- Arisa Cox (born 1978), Canadian television and radio personality
- Arisa Trew (born 2010) Australian skateboarder
- Arisa White, American poet

== Fictional characters ==
- Arisa Ichigaya (市ヶ谷 有咲), keyboardist of the band Poppin'Party from the multimedia franchise BanG Dream!
- Arisa Matsuda (松田 亜利沙), a character in The Idolmaster Million Live!
- Arisa Randīru (アリサ・ランディール), protagonist of the first Phantasy Star role-playing video game
- Arisa Uotani (魚谷 ありさ), a character in Fruits Basket
- Arisa Ayase, a character in Love Live! School Idol Project

== See also ==
- Alisa (disambiguation)
