= Tim Lawson (writer) =

American writer and musician (born 1961)

Tim Lawson (born December 13, 1961, in Sterling, Illinois) is an American writer and musician.

== Bibliography ==
- Tim Lawson & Alisa Persons, The Magic Behind The Voices: A Who's Who of Cartoon Voice Actors, University Press of Mississippi 2004, ISBN 978-1-57806-696-4.

== Sources ==
- University Press of Mississippi: http://www.upress.state.ms.us/books/461
