= Makvala Kasrashvili =

Georgian opera singer (born 1942)

Makvala Kasrashvili მაყვალა ქასრაშვილი
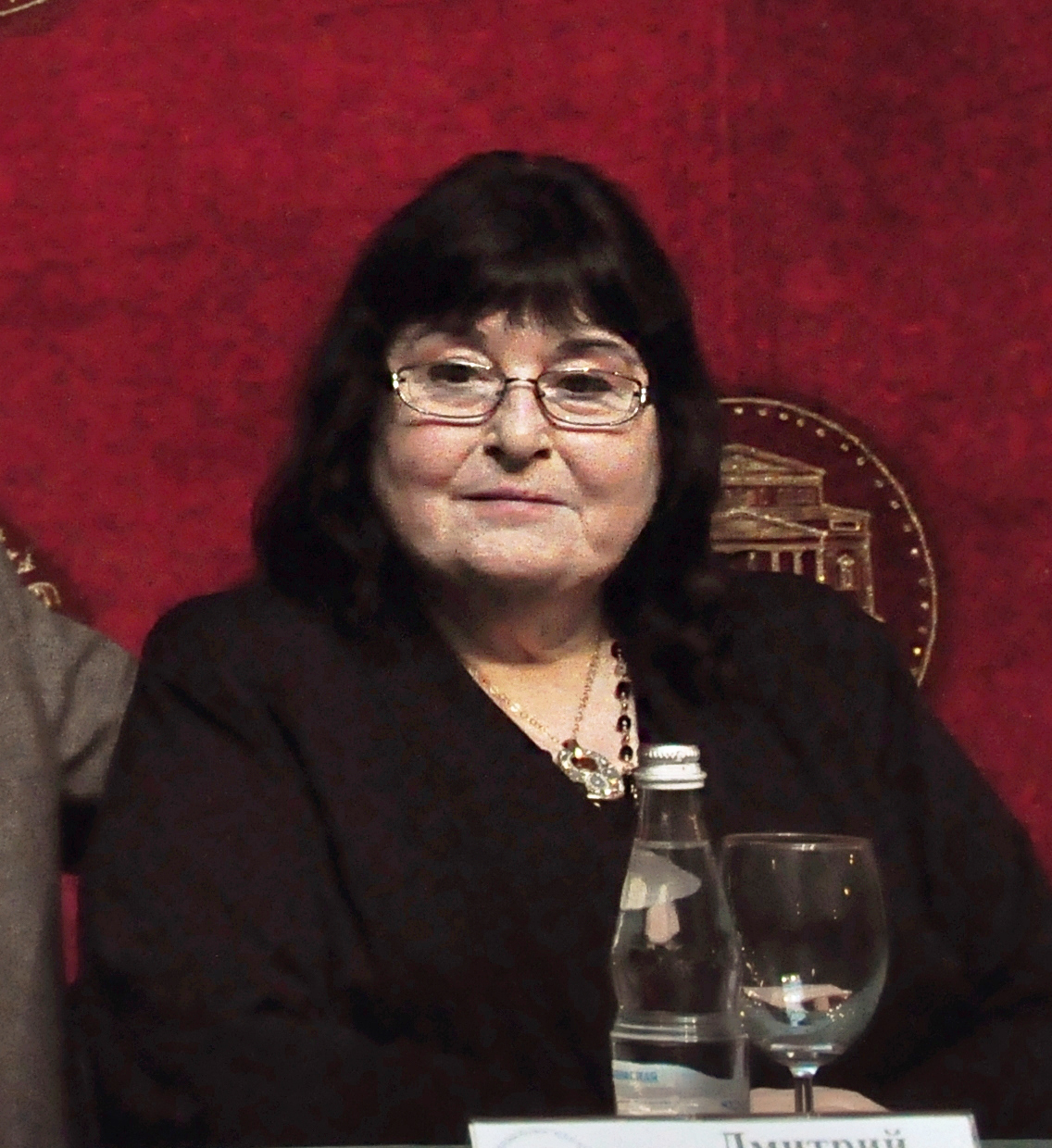
- Kasrashvili in 2013

Background information
- Born: 13 March 1942 (age 84); Kutaisi, Georgian SSR, Soviet Union
- Genres: Classical
- Occupation: Opera singer
- Instrument: Singing

Makvala Kasrashvili (Note: Georgian: მაყვალა ქასრაშვილი, romanized: Maq’vala Kasrashvili; Russian: Маквала Филимоновна Касрашвили, romanized: Makvala Filimonovna Kasrashvili) (born 13 March 1942) is a Georgian opera singer (soprano).

Born 13 March 1942 (not 15 March 1948, as some sources incorrectly state) in Kutaisi, Georgian SSR, she graduated from Tbilisi State Conservatory in 1966. Since 1968, she has been a soloist with Bolshoi Theatre, Moscow. Beginning with her international debut at Metropolitan Opera, New York City, in 1979, she has also performed at Royal Opera House and Covent Garden, London. She was awarded State Prizes of Georgia in 1983 and of Russia in 1998, and the title of People's Artist of the USSR in 1986. Since 2000, she has been the Director of Opera at the Bolshoi Theatre.
