= Alisa M. Goldstein =

American genetic epidemiologist

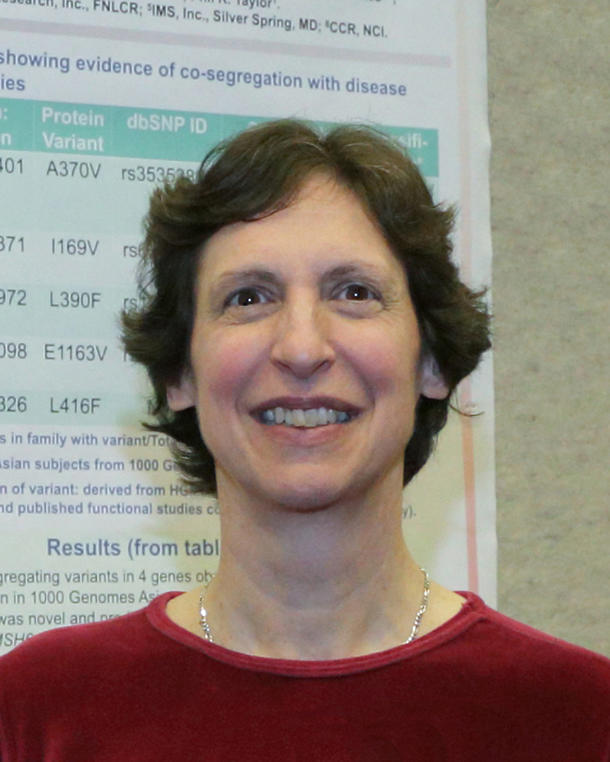
- Goldstein in 2012
- Born: Alisa Miriam Goldstein
- Education: University of California, Los Angeles
- Scientific career
- Fields: Genetic epidemiology
- Workplaces: National Cancer Institute
- Doctoral advisor: Robert Haile

Alisa Miriam Goldstein is an American genetic epidemiologist who researches the genetic and environmental causes of cancer. She is a senior investigator at the National Cancer Institute.

== Life ==
Goldstein received a Ph.D. in genetic epidemiology from the University of California, Los Angeles in 1988. Her dissertation was titled, A genetic epidemiologic investigation of breast cancer in families with bilateral breast cancer. Robert Haile was her doctoral advisor. Goldstein completed a fellowship in the National Institutes of Health (NIH) InterInstitute Medical Genetics Program, and is board certified in medical genetics.

Goldstein joined the National Cancer Institute's division of cancer epidemiology and genetics (DCEG). She received NIH scientific tenure in 1997. She is a senior investigator in the clinical genetics branch. Her research focuses on genetic epidemiologic studies of several cancers, including melanoma and upper gastrointestinal (UGI) cancer. The main goal of Goldstein's studies is to understand the role of genetic and environmental factors in the etiology of these cancers. Her studies combine epidemiologic, genetic, clinical, and molecular methodologies.

== See also ==
- List of University of California, Los Angeles people
