= Alisa Chumachenko =

Lithuanian entrepreneur

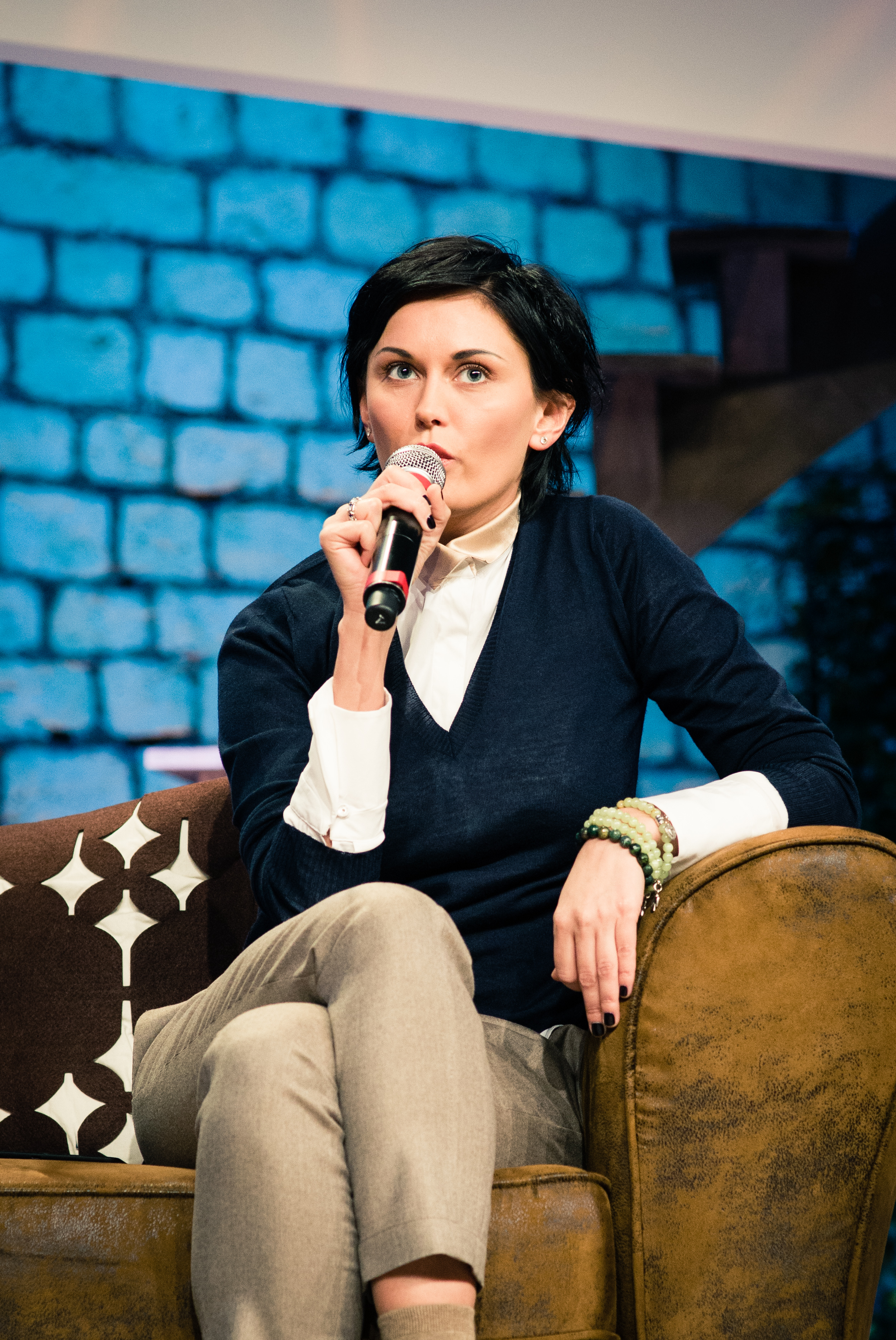
Alisa Chumachenko talking at LeWeb, Paris, 2012

Alisa Chumachenko is a Russian entrepreneur.

== Education ==
Chumachenko graduated from the Russian Academy of Theatre Art in 2004 with a degree in Art Direction.

== Career ==
In 2010, she founded "Game Insight", a company building online games. In 2015, she stepped down as CEO of Game Insight. In 2017, she founded GOSU Data Lab, a company using machine learning to provide data to gamers and games companies. By 2018, GOSU Data Lab had raised $2.3 million.

== Awards ==
- In 2012, Erns & Young named her “Entrepreneur of the Year 2012”.
- In 2012, Forbes named her “Manager of the Year 2012.”
- In 2018, Forbes named her one of Europe's Top 50 Women in Technology.

== Quotes ==
"The hardest thing to overcome is yourself. The next game always has to be bigger than the previous one. That’s what I think about every day"
