= Ailsa Craig (journalist) =

Australian journalist and writer

- Born: 27 February 1917; Sydney, New South Wales, Australia
- Died: 9 December 2012 (aged 95)
- Education: University of Sydney
- Writing career
- Notable work: Life with the Middletons
- Notable awards: Walkley Award (1966)

Ailsa Craig (27 February 1917 – 9 December 2012) was an Australian journalist and writer.

== Biography ==
Craig was born in Sydney on 27 February 1917. Her publican father died when she was two. She was educated at the University of Sydney, graduating with first-class honours which led to her employment at the university as a demonstrator in zoology.

The rights to her novel, If Blood Should Stain the Wattle, were bought for £150 by The Sydney Morning Herald. Described as "told with quiet, but compelling power in the manner of Daphne du Maurier", it was serialised by that paper in April 1947. Following its publication as a book in 1947, it was later serialised on ABC Radio. She then wrote a radio serial, The Intruder, for 2UW.

She became a cadet journalist with The Australian Women's Weekly, then moved to The Sydney Morning Herald and was their London correspondent from 1954 to 1957 and is "believed to be the first woman to hold the position".

Back in Australia, in 1957, she joined Woman's Day where she worked until 1976, in a number of roles including news editor and feature writer. In the latter role, she won a Walkley Award for Best Magazine Feature Story (Non-Fiction) in 1966.

Her 1974 book, Australia Album, was published as a tribute to Lillian Roxon. She edited the compilation of photographs and wrote stories associated with them.

== Works ==
- If Blood Should Stain the Wattle, 1947 novel
- Australia Album: The Past in Pictures, 1974

== Death ==
Craig died on 9 December 2012, survived by her daughter and two sons and their families.
