= Alisa Wells =

American photographer (1927–1988)

- Born: Alice Wells; November 26, 1927; Erie, Pennsylvania, U.S.
- Died: January 5, 1988 (aged 60); Galisteo, New Mexico, U.S.
- Other names: Alisa Andrews, Alice Wells, Alice Wells-Witteman
- Known for: Photography

Alisa Wells (November 26, 1927 – January 5, 1988), born Alice Wells, and also known as Alisa Andrews, Alice Wells-Witteman and Alisa Attenberger, was an American photographer who created multi-layered images and worked with found glass-plate negatives. She was most active as a photographer from 1962 to 1975, during which she was included in over thirty-five group exhibitions and six one-person exhibitions. Her work is in the permanent collection of The Museum of Fine Arts, Houston, the Los Angeles County Museum of Art, New Mexico State University, and the Eastman house.

== Life and work ==
Wells studied at Pennsylvania State University. She married and moved to Rochester, New York. While there she started working at the Eastman Kodak Company and in the summer of 1959 began to be interested in photography.

In 1961 to 1962 Wells enrolled in a photography workshop with Nathan Lyons, who became Well's mentor for the next 11 years. In 1962 she quit her job at Kodak and joined the Eastman House. Also in 1962 she assumed the last name of Daniel Andrews, the name of the man she was living with at the time, out of concern for her professional status.

By the mid-1960s Wells was experimenting with creating multiple layers in an image by running exposed film back through the camera. It was also around this time that she started photographing with fellow photographer Robert W. Fichter. In 1967 she was promoted to Associate Curator of Extension Activities at Eastman House. In 1968 she created the series "The Glass Menagerie" and left Rochester to teach at the University of California in Los Angeles. After moving to California she began to practice Zen Buddhism.

In 1969, Wells created the series "Found Moments Transformed" which used and transformed found glass-plate negatives. She altered the originals through staining, solarization, and experimenting with other technical processes. She also manipulated the subjects in the images – destroying women's faces, but leaving men's untouched. The Eastman house bought 30 of these images and created a traveling exhibition. Around this time Wells became suspicious of another Eastman House employee of wanting to destroy her work. Because of these suspicions, both were fired and Lyons resigned. After this, Lyons founded the Visual Studies Workshop, and Wells became his assistant until January 1972.

In the summer of 1970 she worked at the Penland School in North Carolina as a photographer instructor and she led a zazen meditation group there.

She moved to the mountains of New Mexico after her time in North Carolina and lived without electricity, running water, or a telephone. During this time she started working with Polaroid film and color slides. She was featured in a traveling exhibition, "Women in Photography: An Historical Survey" in 1975. Around this time, Wells worked at the University of New Mexico and exhibited at the Santa Fe Gallery of Photography.
