= Alisa Kolosova =

Russian mezzo-soprano (born 1987)

Alisa Kolosova Алиса Владимировна Колосова
- Born: 29 July 1987 (age 39); Moscow
- Genres: Opera
- Occupation: Musician
- Instrument: Singing

Alisa Vladimirovna Kolosova (Russian: Алиса Владимировна Колосова; born 29 July 1987 in Moscow) is a Russian mezzo-soprano.

Kolosova studied music from age five, focusing on piano and choral singing, then enrolled in the Russian Academy of Theatre Arts in 2004, where she studied under Yevgeny Zhuravkin. In 2005, she began studies at the Academic Music College of the Moscow State Conservatory, where she notably took masterclasses with Makvala Kasrashvili, Sergei Leiferkus, Thomas Quasthoff, and Christa Ludwig.

She was a semi-finalist at the International Hans Gabor Belvedere Singing Competition in Vienna in 2007, and a finalist in the Competizione dell' Opera, held in Dresden, Germany, in 2008. She was awarded the special jury prize at the Francisco Viñas Competition in Barcelona, and at the Tibor Varga Competition in Switzerland in 2009. In October 2009, she joined the Paris Opera's Atelier Lyrique, and subsequently performed with the Paris Opera many times.

Kolosova's breakthrough occurred in 2010 at the Salzburg Whitsun Festival, where she performed Mozart's La Betulia liberata, directed by Riccardo Muti. She has since performed with major orchestras and opera companies around the world, and was a member of the ensemble of the Vienna State Opera from 2011 to 2014. In 2015, she was nominated for the Warner Music Prize.
