= Out of the Cold =

Canadian volunteer program

Out of the Cold is a volunteer driven program run in many Canadian cities during the cold winter months serving homeless and poor community members. While initially a Catholic program started by Sister Susan Moran at St. Michael's College School, it has grown into a multi-faith initiative, with community organizations such as churches, synagogues and mosques in a city taking turns providing food, hospitality and medical services. The program runs from about mid November to early April. Some programs may be open every night, while others are only open certain nights. The availability of volunteers may also dictate how often a certain program is open.

Those receiving the services are called guests. Guests are treated with care, respect and without judgment. Unlike other shelter programs, Out of the Cold does not generally require detailed registration.

== Typical Services ==
Following are list of services that may be offered by an organization participating in the Out of the Cold program. An organization may choose to provide one or more services depending on their capacity.

- Hot, Cooked Food
- Clothing
- Overnight Bed
- Nurses / Medical Care
- Showers
- Personal Hygiene Services such as Haircut
- Transportation to/from
