= Alissa Thomas-Newborn =

First female American Orthodox Jewish rabbinical leader in Los Angeles, California

Rabbanit Alissa Thomas-Newborn
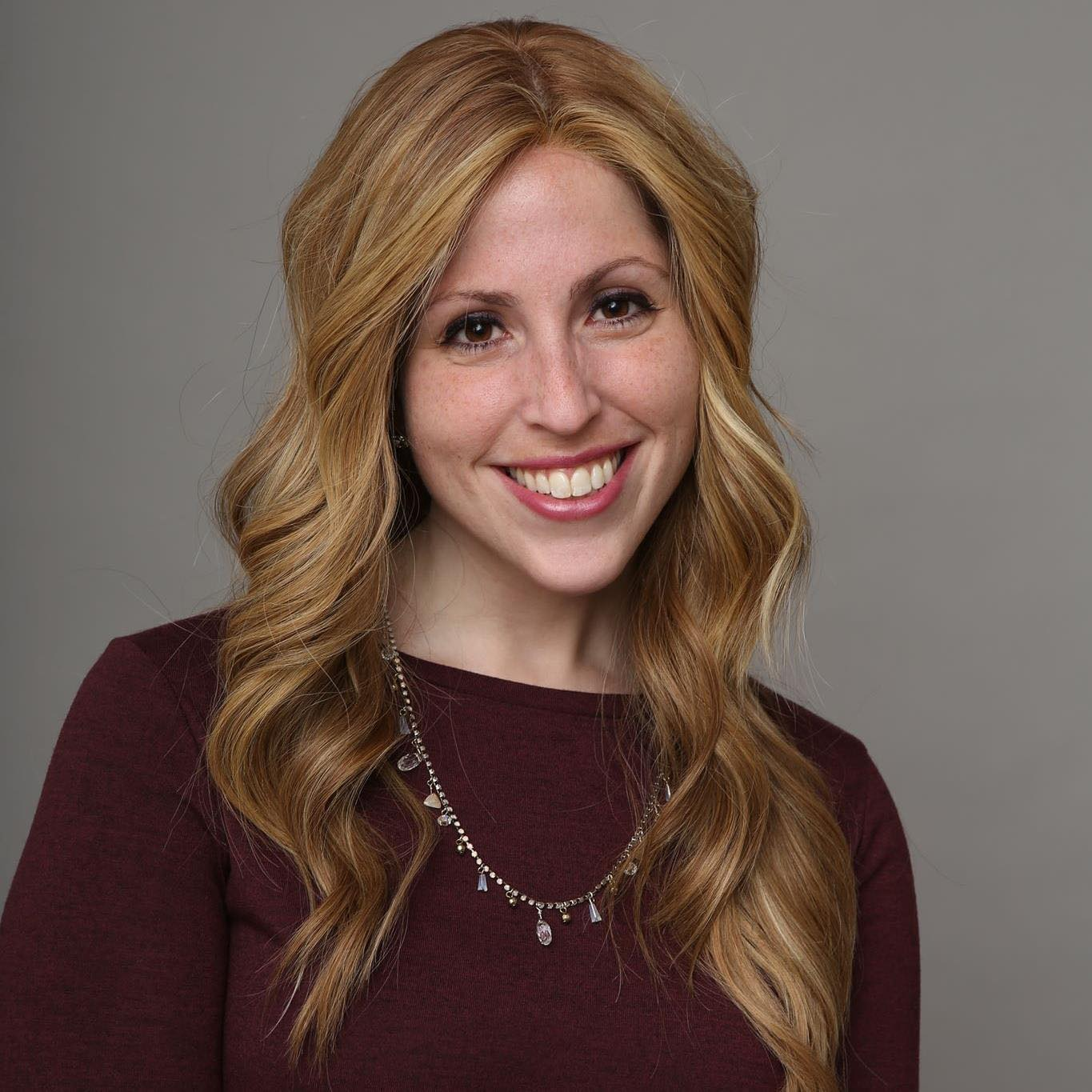

Personal life
- Spouse: Akiva Newborn
- Children: Ella
- Education: Brandeis University
- Occupation: Jewish clergy member and spiritual leader

Religious life
- Religion: Judaism
- Denomination: Orthodox Judaism
- Profession: Chaplain
- Synagogue: Congregation Netivot Shalom
- Yeshiva: Yeshivat Maharat
- Residence: Teaneck, New Jersey
- Semikhah: Avi Weiss

Alissa Thomas-Newborn is an Orthodox Jewish spiritual leader who, in August 2015, became the first female rabbinical member appointed by a Los Angeles Orthodox Jewish synagogue, assuming a spiritual leadership role with the B'nai David-Judea Congregation. The announcement of her appointment came on May 2, 2015, from the synagogue's bimah by its principal rabbinical leader, Rabbi Yosef Kanefsky.

== Life and career ==
Thomas-Newborn was raised in Redondo Beach, California. Her mother, Rabbi Didi Thomas, is a Reform rabbi and spiritual leader of Temple Emet, a Reform synagogue that meets in Rancho Palos Verdes. Thomas-Newborn lives in Teaneck, NJ with her husband Akiva Newborn and their daughter, Ella.

=== Education ===
Thomas-Newborn graduated magna cum laude from Brandeis University with a degree in Near Eastern and Judaic Studies and Classical Studies Archaeology and Ancient History. She also spent time studying at a number of other institutions, including the Pardes Institute of Jewish Studies, Neve Yerushalayim and The Jewish Theological Seminary of America.

Thomas-Newborn trained at Yeshivat Maharat, the female rabbinical training program run by Rabbi Avi Weiss in Bronx, New York, and took her ordination exam in May 2015. Like all Yeshivat Maharat graduates, Thomas-Newborn received the title of maharat at ordination, which is an acronym for manhiga hilchatit ruchanit toranit, translating into English as a "female leader of Jewish law, spirit and Torah."

In addition to her rabbinical training, Thomas-Newborn is a board certified chaplain (BCC) through Neshama: Association of Jewish Chaplains and has trained at a number of hospital-based programs such as New York-Presbyterian Hospital/Columbia University Medical Center and Cedars-Sinai Medical Center.

From 2015 until 2020, Thomas-Newborn served on the spiritual leadership team at B'nai David-Judea Congregation in Los Angeles, California. She was the first Orthodox Jewish female clergy member in the Los Angeles area. In May 2022, she moved to Teaneck, New Jersey with her family and assumed the role of rabbanit at Congregation Netivot Shalom. She is also a full time chaplain at Columbia University Irving Medical Center, specializing in palliative, ICU and psychiatric emergency care.

Thomas-Newborn has served as a writer for The Center for Jewish End of Life Care at Metropolitan Jewish Health System, as a fellow at Clal: The National Center for Jewish Learning and Leadership, and a fellow at the UJA-Federation of New York Wiener Educational Center. She has also served as a scholar-in-residence at many synagogues and colleges across the country.

=== Rabbinical status ===
Because of communal politics and controversy about the formal appointment of females as members of the clergy in Orthodoxy, caution was in place when it comes to assigning a title for Thomas-Newborn. After much consideration, the B'nai David-Judea board came up with the title morateinu, which means "our teacher" (in feminine gender) in Hebrew, for her to assume upon formal appointment.

Almost two years after the decision to use morateinu as Thomas-Newborn's title, in December 2016, the B'nai David Judea board came to consensus to change her title to rabbanit. Reasons for the change included morateinu being grammatically awkward and rabbanit having more prestige. Also, Thomas-Newborn preferred the title, especially because Yeshivat Maharat supports it. She said, "Yeshivat Maharat is an institution that gives s'micha, but does not give titles. They fully support a variety of titles, rabbanit being one of them, so we were in consultation with them and I am extraordinarily grateful to Yeshivat Maharat's involvement."

=== Position in Orthodox Judaism ===
A collaborative effort between four Los Angeles-based Orthodox institutions—Young Israel of Century City, Shalhevet High School, BDJ, and Beth Jacob—was almost derailed when the latter found out that Thomas-Newborn was one of the seven scheduled speakers. Because the event was being held entirely at Beth Jacob and they intended to pull out of the event, it was almost canceled. Eventually, a plan was brokered in which the event would be split into two partial events held at different locations, with Thomas-Newborn scheduled to speak at BDJ, where she served as an intern. Beth Jacob had no issue with Ruthie Skaist, another female Judaic studies teacher, being included on the list of speakers because there "was no controversy surrounding her," whereas the perception was that some thought that Thomas-Newborn "was becoming a rabbi," according to Marc Rohatiner, past president of Beth Jacob and an alumni parent at Shalhevet, another of the four institutions involved.

In February 2017, the Orthodox Union announced a new policy that it would not allow women to serve as clergy at its member shuls. Their rabbinic panel decided that women serving as clergy contradicts halakhic values and conflicts with gender roles of traditional Judaism. Rabbi Yosef Kanefsky, BDJ's head rabbi, wrote an opinion piece for the Jewish Journal in response to the OU's decision, stating his support for Thomas-Newborn as a clergy member and refusal to accept this ruling. He criticized the panel's broad interpretation of specific texts and failure to acknowledge other paramount texts in making this decision. Kanefsky concluded his article with: "Our Orthodox synagogue, along with the several others who proudly have women on their clergy staff, will obviously not be accepting the new OU policy. I do not know what action the Orthodox Union will take against us. But I do know that we will be strong, and that we will be resolute, because that’s what you do when you are right. That’s what you do when your driving value is the service of God and of the Jewish people."

== See also ==
- Sara Hurwitz
- Dina Brawer
- Shira Marili Mirvis
- Rachel Kohl Finegold
