= Redhead Express =

American country music band

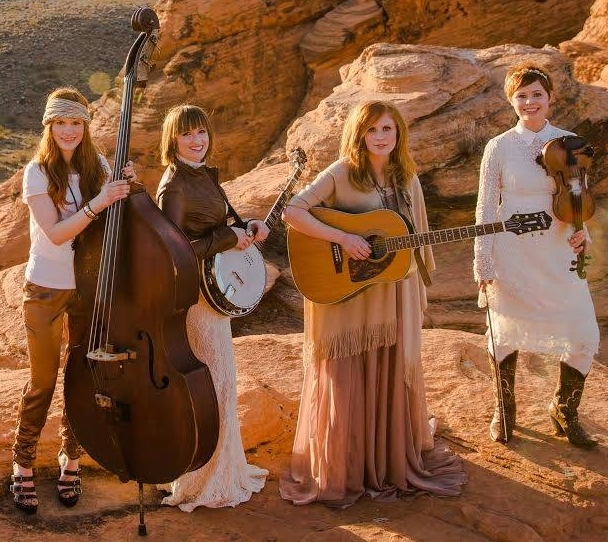

Background information
- Origin: Palmer, Alaska, United States
- Genres: Country music
- Years active: 2007–present
- Members: Alisa Walker; Kendra Walker; LaRae Walker; Meghan Walker
- Website: redheadexpress.com

The Redhead Express is an American country music band consisting of four sisters: Kendra (lead singer, guitar. songwriting), Alisa (second lead and alto singer, fiddle, mandolin), LaRae (alto and tenor harmony singer, banjo, dobro, guitar), and Meghan Walker (tenor harmony singer, bass).

== History ==
The Walker sisters are from Palmer, Alaska, where they formed a family band with their three brothers and their parents, which they voted to call "Redhead Express" because most of them are redheads. In 2007, motivated by their love of music, the Walkers decided to sell their belongings, purchase an RV, a trailer, and travel across the contiguous United States to perform. Since then, the Walker family has done hundreds of shows during their tours, including at state and county fairs, and festivals. Gradually, the four sisters became the stars of the group, with their parents taking managerial positions, and their brothers formed a band called the Walker Brothers.

== Career ==
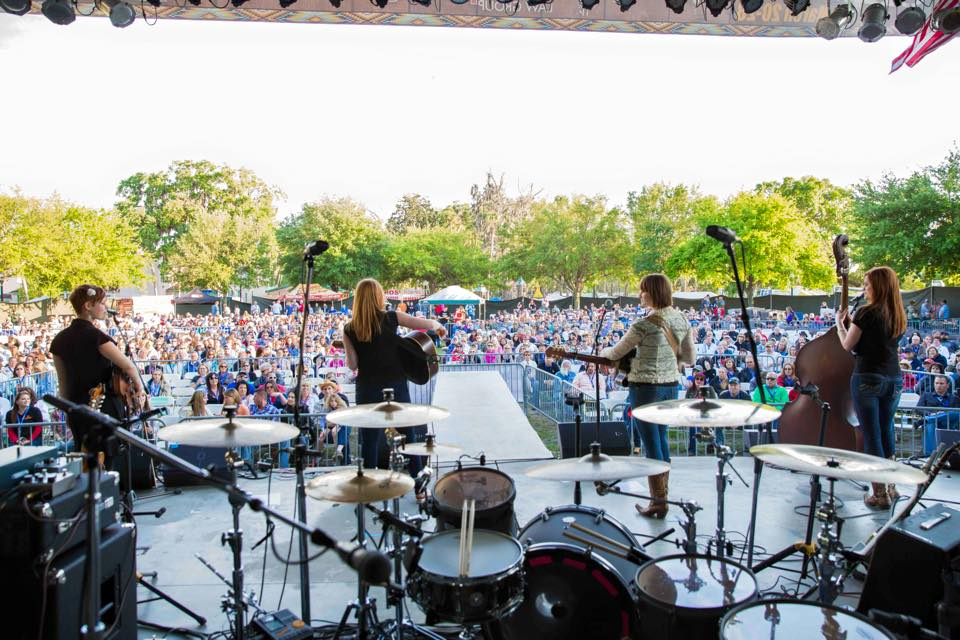
The Redhead Express performing at Chasco Fiesta in March 2015

In 2010, the Redhead Express sought out Grammy-winning record producer Paul Worley, who agreed to work with them, spending four years supervising their artistic development, and is now producing their first country album.

In June 2014, the Redhead Express appeared live on a WCYB-TV newscast, as well as on WSMV-TV, to play one of their songs. Other TV channels that have featured the band include Iowa Public Television and a live interview on KCWI-TV's Great Day morning news show.

In February 2015, the quartet performed at the Lincoln Theatre in Marion, Virginia, for the Song of the Mountains concert series, which is broadcast on over 190 public television channels in the United States; it was their third appearance on that show. The feature-length film Moose - The Movie, released in 2015, includes some of the Redhead Express' songs in the soundtrack.

== Discography ==
=== Albums ===
- Alaska Grass (2007)
- Remember Your Roots (2014)
- Covers (2014)
- Covers 2 (2016)
