= Alisa Jakobi =

Estonian artist, actress and graphic designer

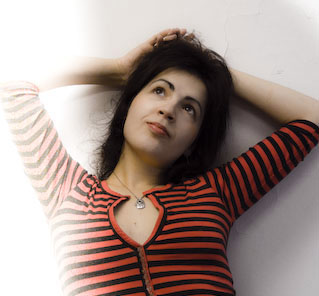
Jakobi in 2007

Alisa Jakobi is an Estonian artist, actress and graphic designer.

== Life and education ==
Alisa Jakobi is an Estonian artist. She studied in the Estonian Academy of Arts, where she completed a BA in Graphic Design in 2005. Later on, she left Estonia for three years to get new inspiration and experience in New York. In 2010, she finished her MA in Art studies in the Tallinn University. Alisa studied in the School of Visual Arts in New York City for a year, worked for Rockaway Graphics as a graphic designer, also worked as an assistant to photographer Ilay Honovich, in NYC. In 2011 she founded her own company Art Jakobi Ltd, where she started working independently.

- 2005 Estonian Academy of Arts, Faculty of Graphic Design
- 2005–06 SVA (School of Visual Arts, NYC), arts management
- 2007–10 University of Tallinn "Fine Art"

== Painting ==
Alisa is working in a minimalist expressionism style, with elements of fauvism. Her recurring topics are the reconciliation of humans with nature and about the relationship between the conscious and unconscious mind. She also developed a concept called "Time to Dance", where she is talking about the depth of the human mind and the changing roles in life of men and women.

=== Works in private collections ===
Her works are in private collections in Estonia, Latvia, France, Israel, the US, the UK, Macedonia, Russia, Australia.

==== Solo exhibitions (selection) ====
- 2016 OR – LIGHT – Valgus - СВЕТ , Tallinn Lennart Meri Airport Gallery
- 2016 Emotional Landscapes vol 5, Võru city gallery, Võru, Estonia
- 2015 IT IS TIME TO DANCE vol 2, Fahle gallery, Tallinn, Estonia
- 2015 Emotional Landscapes vol4, Rakvere city gallery, Rakvere, Estonia
- 2015 Emotional Landscapes vol3, Kuressaare muuseum, Kuressaare, Saaremaa, Estonia
- 2015 Emotional Landscapes vol2.5, Ministry of Agriculture, Tallinn, Estonia
- 2015 Emotional Landscapes vol.2, Toompea Castle Art Gallery, Tallinn, Estonia, Estonia
- 2014 Emotional Landscapes vol.2, Tallinn Lennart Meri Airport Gallery, Estonia
- 2014 Emotional Landscapes, Aedvilja Tänava Gallery, Tallinn, Estonia
- 2014 IT IS TIME TO DANCE, Aedvilja Tänava Gallery, Tallinn, Estonia
- 2002 Light and Colour, Showing room of JCC, at Karu 16 A, Tallinn, Estonia

==== Group exhibitions (selection) ====
- 2016 – Futu Muhu 2016, curatored by Karl-Kristjan Nagel and Tiiu Rebane. Kuressaare, Estonia
- 2016 – “Peace“ exhibition against terrorism, group exhibition of Estonian artists in GALERIE DE LA VERRIERE, Paris, France
- 2016 –“Peace“ group exhibition of Estonian artists in 12 AVENUE DES ARTS gallery, Paris, France
- 2015 – “ 5th PLainair in Juodkrante", LIUDVIKO RĖZOS cultural cente, Neringa municipality, Curonian Spit, Lithuania
- 2015 – “NIDOS EKSPRESIJA-2015“ Agila culture centre, Nida, Curonian Spit, Lithuania. Curator: S. Kruopis
- 2015 – “Symphony of colours“ Tallinna Idakeskus gallery. Curator T.Kuusik
- 2015 – AmCham charity auction, Tallinn, Estonia. (amcham.ee)
- 2015 – BECC charity Burns supper auction, Tallinn, Estonia (charity.becc.ee)
- 2014 – International group exhibition at Monastir Joakim Osogovski, Kriva Palanka, Macedonia
- 2014 – Performing art "Music+painting" experimental music session, Tallinn, Estonia, Gustav Adolf Grammar

School courtyard https://www.facebook.com/events/259752777557060/

- 2013 – TALLINNA KUNSTI TUULED, Art Fair in Tammsaare park, Tallinn, Estonia.
- 2012 – Strike – exhibition of Art Teachers in Estonian parliament, Riigikogu, Tallinn, Estonia.
- 2010 – Ahne 2010, Suvilahti, Finland
- 2008 – Ahne 2008 Video "Time to Dance", Suvilahti, Finland
- 2008 – Kunst@tlu, Draakoni gallery, Tallinn, Estonia.
- 2008 – Art Kitchen Happening@Fantast Festival, Muhu, Saaremaa island, Muhu, Estonia.
- 2005 – Exhibition of posters, Gallery of Estonian Academy of Arts, Tallinn, Estonia.
- 2003 – Group exhibition of emerging artists in NYC, Broadway gallery, New York City
- 2002 – Madonna of 21 Century, Jaama Gallery, Tallinn, Estonia.
