= Alisa Bokulich =

American philosopher

Education
- Education: University of Notre Dame; Washington State University

Philosophical work
- Era: Contemporary philosophy
- Region: Western philosophy
- School: Analytic philosophy
- Institutions: Boston University; Harvard University
- Main interests: philosophy of science, physical sciences, classical mechanics, quantum mechanics and geosciences

Alisa Bokulich is an American philosopher of science and Professor of Philosophy at Boston University. Since 2010 she has been the Director of the Center for Philosophy and History of Science at Boston University, where she organizes the Boston Colloquium for Philosophy of Science, and serves as a Series Editor for Boston Studies in Philosophy and History of Science. She was the first woman ever to be tenured in the Philosophy Department at Boston University and the first woman to become a director of a center for history and philosophy of science in North America.

== Education ==
Bokulich attended high school at Forest Ridge School in Bellevue, Washington, got her Bachelor's in Philosophy, with a minor in Physics, from Washington State University, and received her Ph.D. from the Program in History and Philosophy of Science at the University of Notre Dame, under the direction of the physicist James T. Cushing. Her academic genealogy, traced through Ph.D. dissertation advisors, is Cushing—Max Dresden—George Uhlenbeck--Paul Ehrenfest--Ludwig Boltzmann.

== Research ==
Her research focuses on the history and philosophy of the physical sciences, especially classical and quantum mechanics, and more recently philosophy of the Earth sciences. She has published widely on topics such as models, explanation, natural kinds, thought experiments, fictions in science, supertasks, and the history of quantum theory. She is the author of the book Reexamining the Quantum-Classical Relation: Beyond Reductionism and Pluralism (Cambridge University Press 2008), which has been well received by physicists and philosophers alike, and co-editor of four other books.
