= Newborn care and safety =

Precautions taken for newborns

Newborn care and safety are activities and precautions recommended for new parents or caregivers. It is an educational goal of many hospitals and birthing centers to promote newborn care and safety as parents take their infant home.

== Newborn care ==
Taking a newborn care class during pregnancy can prepare caregivers for their future responsibilities. During the stay in a hospital or a birthing center, clinicians and nurses help with basic baby care and demonstrate how to perform it. Newborn care basics include:

- Handling a newborn, including supporting the baby's neck
- Bathing
- Dressing
- Swaddling
- Soothing
- Feeding and burping
- Cleaning the umbilical cord
- Using a bulb syringe to clear the baby's nasal passages
- Checking a newborn's temperature
- Immunization
- Change the baby's diaper on time to prevent diaper rash.

Many new parents appreciate somebody checking in with them and their baby a few days after coming home, and can ask about home visits by a nurse or health care worker. If breastfeeding, the mother can ask whether a lactation consultant can visit her and the baby at home to provide follow-up support and help with finding other resources in the community, such as peer support groups.

Many first-time parents also welcome the help of an experienced family member or friend. Having a support person stay with the newborn for a few days can give the mother the confidence to go at it alone in the weeks ahead. This can be arranged before delivery.

The baby's first doctor's visit is another good time to ask any infant care questions. Parents can ask about the various reasons to call the doctor and inquire about the vaccines their baby needs. Young children need vaccines because the diseases they protect against can strike at an early age and can be very dangerous in childhood. This includes both rare diseases and more common ones, such as the flu.

Caring for a newborn also includes health screening of the newborn. Most of the time this occurs in the hospital or pediatrician's office shortly after birth. Every state screens babies for more than two dozen disorders. Early detection of a disorder can prevent future complications.

== Safe nutrition ==
Handwashing is the first step in maintaining the safety of infant food. Handwashing helps to prevent the spread of foodborne illnesses to children. Pathogenic microorganisms can be transmitted from other children and their diapers, and from uncooked meat, seafood, eggs, dogs, cats, turtles, snakes, birds, lizards, and soil.

== Sudden infant death syndrome ==
Since 1992, the American Academy of Pediatrics has recommended that infants be placed to sleep on their backs to reduce the risk of sudden infant death syndrome (SIDS), also called crib death. SIDS is the sudden and unexplained death of a baby under 1 year of age. Even though there is no way to know which babies might die of SIDS, recommendations include:

- Always place the baby on his or her back to sleep, even for naps. This is the safest sleep position for a healthy baby to reduce the risk of SIDS.
- Place the baby on a firm mattress, such as in a safety-approved crib. Research has shown that placing a baby to sleep on soft mattresses, sofas, sofa cushions, waterbeds, sheepskins, or other soft surfaces raises the risk of SIDS.
- Remove soft, fluffy, and loose bedding and stuffed toys from the baby's sleep area. Make sure all pillows, quilts, stuffed toys, and other soft items are kept away from the baby's sleep area.
- Do not use infant sleep positioners. Using a positioner to hold an infant on his or her back or side for sleep is dangerous and not needed.
- Use infant sleep sacks that are designed to be used with zippers, snaps, or velcro for infants to wear during sleep in place of loose bedding and swaddle blankets which pose a greater risk.
- Make sure everyone who cares for the baby knows to place the baby on his or her back to sleep and about the dangers of soft bedding. Talk to child care providers, grandparents, babysitters, and all caregivers about SIDS risk. Remember, every sleep time counts.
- Make sure the baby's face and head stay uncovered during sleep. Keep blankets and other coverings away from the baby's mouth and nose. The best way to do this is to dress the baby in sleep clothing so they will not have to use any other covering over the baby. If using a blanket or another covering, make sure that the baby's feet are at the bottom of the crib, the blanket is no higher than the baby's chest, and the blanket is tucked in around the bottom of the crib mattress.
- Do not allow smoking around the baby. Don't smoke before or after the birth of the baby and make sure no one smokes around the baby.
- Don't let the baby get too warm during sleep. Keep the baby warm during sleep, but not too warm. The baby's room should be at a temperature that is comfortable for an adult. Too many layers of clothing or blankets can overheat the baby.

Some parents worry that the baby can roll over during the night. However, by the time the baby is able to roll over by itself, the risk for SIDS is much lower. During the time of greatest risk, 2 to 4 months of age, most babies are not able to turn over from their backs to their stomachs.

== Car seats ==
Newborns and older infants are to use rear-facing car seats. These are required until age 2 or when they reach the upper weight or height limit of that seat. After this, a forward-facing car seat is used. Motor vehicle crashes are a leading cause of death for children in the US. Buckling up is the best way to save lives and reduce injuries. Child passenger restraint laws result in more children being buckled up. Only 2 out of every 100 children live in states that require car seat or booster seat use for newborns and infants. A third of children who died in crashes in 2011 were not buckled up. Caregivers promote the safety their newborns by: knowing how to use car seats, booster seats, and seat belts and using them on every trip, no matter how short.

== See also ==
- Infant bathing
- Infant nutrition
