= Alissa M. Weaver =

American cell biologist

Academic background
- Education: BA, Political Science, BS, Biology, Stanford University; MD, PhD, Biochemistry, 1997, University of Virginia School of Medicine
- Thesis: [Alpha]_{2}-Macroglobulin and LRP in the regulation of vascular smooth muscle cell physiology (1997)

Academic work
- Institutions: Vanderbilt University
- Main interests: cancer invasion

Alissa Margaret Weaver is an American scientist. In 2017, she was promoted to the Cornelius Vanderbilt Endowed Chair of Cell and Developmental Biology and Pathology, Microbiology and Immunology at the Vanderbilt University School of Medicine.

== Early life and education ==
Weaver completed her Bachelor of Arts degree in political science and Bachelor of Science degree in biology from Stanford University. She then enrolled in medical school at the University of Virginia School of Medicine but also wanted to have the formal training of getting a PhD so she completed her doctoral degree at the same institution, joining the Medical Scientist Training Program in her second year of medical school. In 1998, she joined the Laboratory Medicine Residency Program at Washington University School of Medicine. In 2000, Weaver received a postdoctoral research fellowship from the Howard Hughes Medical Institute to pursue her studies in John Cooper's laboratory at Washington University in St. Louis on dynamic regulation of the actin cytoskeleton.

== Career ==
In 2003, Weaver accepted a faculty position at the Vanderbilt University School of Medicine and focused her research on how branched actin assembly drives cancer cell migration and invasion. As an associate professor of Cancer Biology, Weaver and her colleagues in the Vanderbilt-Ingram Cancer Center and the Department of Biomedical Informatics used computational modeling and experimental studies to identify how proteins PI3-kinase and PKC-alpha worked together to promote formation of invadopodia, actin-based protrusiona that are hotspots for secretion of matrix-degrading proteinases. In 2013, she found that invadopodia and exosomes, two features of invasive cancer cells, were linked together and that invadopodia act as docking sites for multivesicular bodies, leading to in situ secretion of exosomes, which are small extracellular vesicles secreted from cells. As a result of her academic research, Weaver was elected to serve on the Association of American Medical Colleges Council of Faculty and Academic Societies and Vanderbilt's Basic Science Research Advisory Committee.

In 2016, Weaver was one of nine Vanderbilt faculty members elected fellows of the American Association for the Advancement of Science. She was recognized for her "distinguished contributions to the field of cancer cell biology, particularly the role of the actin cytoskeleton and membrane trafficking machineries in promoting cancer invasion." The following year, she was promoted to the Cornelius Vanderbilt Endowed Chair at the Vanderbilt University School of Medicine. In 2022, Weaver was elected as a fellow of the American Society for Cell Biology.

During the COVID-19 pandemic, Weaver was the co-recipient of a $9 million five-year program project grant to study extracellular RNA in colorectal cancer from the National Cancer Institute. The grant would "support multiple projects that aim to define fundamental biological principles about extracellular RNA signaling and the development and aggressiveness of colorectal cancer, the second leading cause of cancer death in the United States." Later that year, she received another grant to support biomanufacturing of new extracellular vesicle-based drug delivery technologies. In 2021, she became Director of the Vanderbilt Center for Extracellular Vesicle Research, whose mission is to catalyze innovative and transformative research in the rapidly evolving extracellular vesicle field.
