= Ailsa Craig Engines =

It was a manufacturer of marine and specialist made-to-order engines from 1891 to 1972

Ailsa Craig Engines was a manufacturer of marine and specialist made-to-order engines from 1891 to 1972. Named after the island off the coast of Ayr, Scotland, Ailsa Craig, the company began as a bicycle manufacturer in Glasgow in 1891, later moving to Putney, London, where the then owner went into partnership and set about building early vehicles, going on in 1904 to produce the world's first V12 engine intended for a Russian airship and even a petrol engined vacuum cleaner for Hubert Cecil Booth in 1904.

== Car production ==
Trading as the Putney Motor Company around 12 cars were made between 1902 and 1912. Each was individually designed to order. The smallest was a single cylinder engined light car made in 1902. At the other extreme was a 50 hp four-cylinder fitted with a luxury body and supplied to the Earl of Norbury.

Between 1906 and 1907 they also sold the Mayfair car which was imported from an unknown source probably French.

== Overview ==
A little later, Ellis Kisch took over and the company moved to 46/47 Strand-on-the-Green, Chiswick in West London. There was a concentration on reliable marine engineering with a Royal Appointment being granted in 1926. Following successful work for the Ministry of Munitions and the Admiralty during the First World War, there was a massive war commitment in 1939 when 5000 engines were to be supplied from an additional factory site in Twickenham. Harold Linford, who was the chief designer and general manager, was killed when an aerial bomb exploded over the Factory at Strand-on-the-Green in 1941. John Watson took over the running of the factory until the move to Ashford in 1949/1950 and there produced further quality diesel engines, with the help of Ricardo Engineering, under the direction of Robert Kisch – son of Ellis, between 1958 and 1963/4 when he was taken ill and moved ultimately to Jersey. This ultimately resulted in the company being sold to the Warsop's Fram Group in 1964.

== Closure ==
In 1972, Ailsa Craig ceased trading, although Dr Kisch and his son Christopher Kisch, continue to offer advice where appropriate.
