= Alisa (gravure idol) =

Japanese former gravure idol and actress (born 1989)

- 亜里沙
- Born: 2 March 1989 (age 37); Fukuoka Prefecture, Japan
- Education: Aoyama Gakuin University Faculty of Letters English and American Literature Department
- Occupations: Gravure idol; actress
- Years active: 2012 – 2015
- Height: 1.56 m (5 ft 1 in) (2013)

Alisa (亜里沙, Arisa; born 2 March 1989, in Fukuoka Prefecture, Japan) is a Japanese former gravure idol and actress. She was represented with Suns Entertainment.

== Biography ==
After graduating from Aoyama Gakuin University English and American Literature Department, she once worked as an office lady for IT Kigyō in March 2011. After working for six months, she was later scouted by Suns Entertainment president Yoshiharu Noda and made her debut as a gravure idol in 2012. She announced her photobook Alisa and the DVD Milky Glamour later in the year. In 2015 she retired from the entertainment industry.

== Publications ==
=== Photobooks ===
Year	Title
2012	Alisa

=== DVD ===
Year	Title	Notes
2012	Milky Glamour	
2012	Aiwokomete	
2013	Watashini Arumono	
2013	Hazukashi sugite	
2013	Fuwatoro	
2014	Himitsu no Alisa	
2014	Dakishimetai	Final DVD

== Filmography ==
=== Internet series ===
Year	Title	Website	Notes
2012	Moshidoya	Nico Jockey	
2013	Alisa to Ichibu o Migurushī Ten ga Gozaimasu	Nico Jockey	Every other Friday

=== Stage ===
Year	Title	Role
2012	Katatsumuri	
2014	K	Neko

=== Radio ===
Year	Title	Network
2012	Madamada Gocha maze! Atsumare Yan Yan	MBS Radio
2012	Hitori Gekidan no Gekidan Samba Festival	FM Fuji

=== Variety ===
Year	Title	Network	Notes
2012	Shimura Gekijō	Fuji TV	(Note: Alisa had the opportunity to join the Shimura Family.)
2013	TakaToshi–Onsui ga Iku Shinise ni Drama no aru Machi: Nishisugamo	Fuji TV	
2013	Takajin no soko made Itte Iinkai	YTV	
2013	Sunday Japon	TBS	
2013	Kenmin Show	YTV	
2013	Yoshimoto Midnight Comedy: 3-nen 2-kumi Ponkotsu no Uta	YTV	
2014	Dr' GO! Gunma Hitō-meguri Drive	TV Tokyo	

=== TV drama ===
Year	Title	Role	Network	Notes
2014	Dai Tokyo Toy Box	Evanzerin	TV Tokyo	
2014	White Labo: Keishichō Tokubetsu Kagaku Sōsahan	Waitress Yoshiko	TBS	Episode 8

=== Advertisements ===
Year	Title	Notes
2012	Heiwa Corporation	
2013	Glico Dairy Dororich	As a member of Dororich Girls
2013	Otsuka Pharmaceutical UL OS	

=== Internet radio ===
Year	Title	Website
2012	Alisa no All Night Nippon	All Night Nippon Mobile

== See also ==
- Gravure idol
