= Alisa Persons =

American writer and video filmmaker

Alisa Persons is an American writer and video filmmaker.

Persons co-wrote The Magic Behind the Voices: A Who's Who of Cartoon Voice Actors. Her photojournalism includes work on a regional Emmy Award winning morning show for an ABC television affiliate. She was the recipient of a 2008 regional Edward R. Murrow Award for New Body, New Life, a piece about a breast cancer survivor.
