= Alisa LaGamma =

American art historian

Alisa LaGamma is the Ceil and Michael E. Pulitzer Curator of the Department of the Arts of Africa, Oceania, and the Americas at the Metropolitan Museum of Art.

She received her PhD from Columbia University in 1995 for a dissertation titled "The Art of the Punu Mukudj Masquerade: Portrait of an Equatorial Society", for which she carried out a year of fieldwork in southern Gabon.

In 1998, she was a guest editor for "African Arts" journal.

In 2012, she received the Iris Award for Outstanding Scholarship of the Bard Graduate Center in recognition of her contribution to rethinking the history of sub-Saharan African art and culture.

She curated the exhibition "Kongo: Power and Majesty".

== Selected publications ==
- Genesis: Ideas of Origin in African Sculpture. Metropolitan Museum of Art, New York, 2002. ISBN 9780300096873
- Eternal Ancestors: The Art of the Central African Reliquary. Metropolitan Museum of Art, New York, 2007.
- Heroic Africans: Legendary Leaders, Iconic Sculptures. New York: Metropolitan Museum of Art, New York, 2011.
- "Silenced Mbembe Muses", Metropolitan Museum Journal, 48 (2013): 143–160.
- Kongo: Power and Majesty. Metropolitan Museum of Art, New York, 2015. ISBN 9781588395757
