= Alisa Margolis =

Ukrainian artist (born 1975)

Alisa Margolis (born 1975 in Kiev, Ukraine) is a Ukrainian-born visual artist, based in Berlin.

== Biography ==
Margolis graduated at the Columbia University in New York in 1997, and her MFA fellowship at de Ateliers in Amsterdam in 2003.

Her work has been shown internationally in many exhibitions, including Expander at the Royal Academy of Arts, London (2004), the 2nd Prague Biennale (2005), The Triumph of Painting at the Saatchi Gallery (2005), Walker Evans and the Barn at the Stedelijk Museum in Amsterdam (2009) and the first Prinzessinnengarten Outdoor Sculpture Triennial in Berlin (2013).

== Literature ==
- Hans Ulrich Gumbrecht, Michele Robecchi, Alisa Margolis: Theory of Everything, Merz & Solitude, Berlin, 2011. ISBN 978-3-9371-5862-4
