= Canadian Centre for Bio-Ethical Reform =

Anti-abortion group based in Canada

- Abbreviation: CCBR
- Formation: 2001; 25 years ago
- Founders: Stephanie Gray; Jojo Ruba
- Type: Nonprofit organization
- Headquarters: Calgary, Alberta
- President: Nick Rosendal
- Staff: 19 (2016)
- Website: www.endthekilling.ca

The Canadian Centre for Bio-Ethical Reform (stylized as CCBR) is an anti-abortion group based in Calgary, Alberta, Canada.

CCBR engages in a wide range of activities, including apologetics training, leafletting, interviews, debates and public demonstrations in campuses, schools, churches and streets throughout North America, and occasionally in Europe.

== History ==
Stephanie Gray and Jojo Ruba co-founded CCBR in 2001. The organization modeled itself after the Center for Bio-Ethical Reform (CBR), founded in 1993 in Lake Forest, California. The president of CCBR is Nick Rosendal.

== Activities ==
=== Abortion Awareness Project ===
The CCBR organizes the Genocide Awareness Project on college campuses, using graphic images to target MPs who support abortion rights. Describing the campaign in 2013, Gray said "We have put together an 18-year plan called 'End the Killing,' and we aim to saturate the Canadian culture with the facts about who the baby is and what abortion does to the baby...so that we can eradicate abortion from our culture." The display contains graphic images of abortion, mass graves, and public lynchings while comparing abortion to the Holocaust and other forms of genocide.

=== "Choice" Chain ===
The CCBR's "Choice" Chain project involves display handheld signs which depict the violence of abortion and aborted fetuses on city streets, college campuses, or outside high schools. The group has also hung banners with similar graphic images from highway overpasses in Hamilton, Ontario.

Writing in Maclean's, Robyn Urback said the group's decision to hold demonstrations outside high schools "pushes the ethics of public pandering" and that "holding up a poster of a bloody fetus provides none of the context, and little of the tact required when dealing with sensitive teens."

In 2013, the National Post reported that Gray said her group's position may be labeled as "extreme" from a mainstream perspective but that "If rejecting a culture of killing children is extreme, I'm OK with that", comparing her view to that of Martin Luther King Jr. in his "Letter from Birmingham Jail", where he responded to criticisms of his tactics as "extreme". She defended the group's tactic of using graphic images as being essential to the anti-abortion movement in exposing the nature of abortion.

=== Face the Children ===
In 2012, a motion in the Parliament of Canada to review the legality of abortion in Canada, failed 203-91. In a campaign called "Face the Children", the Centre is targeting several opponents of the motion, specifically the Calgary ridings of MP Michelle Rempel and Prime Minister Stephen Harper, by distributing tens of thousands of pamphlets containing what the National Post called "gruesome images" of abortion.

=== Calgary Airport protest case ===
Several members of the group were arrested for trespassing at Calgary International Airport during a protest in 2011, but were acquitted in a 2013 bench trial, as the judge said their actions were protected by the Canadian Charter of Rights and Freedoms.

== The Trudeau Flyer Campaign ==
In late Q1 of 2015 the Canadian Centre for Bio-Ethical Reform distributed a graphic flyer campaign which paired photos of aborted fetuses with leader of the Liberal Party of Canada, Justin Trudeau. The aim was explained to graphically show images of a bloodied aborted fetus killed by abortion next to Justin Trudeau to a million homes nationwide in a bid to sway the fall election. The mail campaign started in late March in Vancouver and reached Toronto by May 2015. Thereafter the greater Toronto area was targeted - including areas of Mississauga and Etobicoke South. The campaign failed in their attempt to sway the election, as Trudeau and the Liberal Party of Canada won, and went on to form a Majority Government.

In response to outrage to the campaign, Jonathon Van Maren, spokesperson for the group said: "Frankly, I hope (people) are shocked. I hope they are horrified. What our pictures do is show that while choice is obviously a precious liberty, some choices are wrong."
