= Cape Kolosov =

Cape Kolosov (66°29′S 50°16′E) is a point along the west side of the ice-covered peninsula that forms the east side of the entrance to Amundsen Bay, Antarctica. It was photographed in 1956 from Australian National Antarctic Research Expeditions aircraft, and rephotographed in 1958 by a Soviet expedition. The cape was named after the polar aviation navigator V. Kolosov, who died in the Arctic.
