= International Association for the Promotion of Christian Higher Education =

Christian educational organization

The International Association for the Promotion of Christian Higher Education (IAPCHE) is an international organization of individuals and institutions, seeking to serve Jesus as Lord by fostering worldwide the development of integral Christian higher education through networking and related academic activity. It was founded in 1975. The Association headquarters is in Grand Rapids, Michigan.

== IAPCHE's Regions ==
As of 2000, the worldwide organization consisted of five regional bodies: one each for Africa, Asia/Oceania, Europe, Latin America, and North America:

Africa: Centre for the Promotion of Christian Higher Education in Africa Centre for the Promotion of Christian Higher Education in Africa is the African regional expression of IAPCHE. The regional director is Rev. Isaac Mutua.

Asia/Oceania: Dr. J. Dinakarlal is the regional director and editor of Asia/Oceania Contact.

Europe: The first worldwide conference in Europe was held in 1984 in Breukelen, the Netherlands.

Latin America: Asociación Internacional para la Promoción de Educación Superior Cristiana (AIPESC) ALC Noticias is the regional expression of IAPCHE in Latin America.

North America: International office located on the Calvin University campus (USA).

== IAPCHE's Services ==
Informing IAPCHE prints a quarterly newsletter, Contact, which contains current information about Christian higher education around the world. Online issues can be found at Contact Newsletter.

The first-ever global survey of the expansion of Christian higher education is in progress.

Connecting Research partners can connect with each other through the online interactive membership directory (Member Directory). IAPCHE organizes regional and international conferences.

Equipping Younger professors can participate in week-long Faculty Enrichment Programs that connect faith and learning, improve teaching, and provide strategies for student outreach. IAPCHE works with the Faith and Learning Network, an exclusive bibliography of faith and learning resources. Faith & Learning Network, Institute for Christian Studies Proceedings of IAPCHE conferences are available from the IAPCHE office.
