= Alisa (disambiguation) =

Alisa is a given name.

Alisa may also refer to:

- Alisa (gravure idol) (born 1989), Japanese gravure idol and actress
- Alisa (moth), a synonym for moths of the genus Agriphila
- Alisa (Russian band), a Russian hard rock band
- Alisa (Serbian band), a Serbian and former Yugoslav pop rock band
- Alisa (TV series), an Indonesian soap opera television series
- Alisa (virtual assistant), a virtual assistant developed by Yandex
