= Jason Grote (bishop) =

American Anglican bishop (born 1973)

The Right Reverend Jason Grote
- Bishop of the Central States
- Church: Anglican Church in North America; Reformed Episcopal Church
- Diocese: Central States
- Other posts: Canon missioner, Reformed Episcopal Church

Orders
- Ordination: 1998 (diaconate); 2000 (priesthood) by Royal U. Grote Jr.
- Consecration: June 4, 2025 by Ray Sutton

Personal details
- Born: 1973 (age 52–53)
- Parents: Royal U. Grote Jr. (father)
- Spouse: Liz Grote
- Children: 2
- Education: Reformed Episcopal Seminary; University of Houston

Jason Robert Grote (born 1973) is an American Anglican bishop. He was consecrated in 2025 as coadjutor bishop of the Diocese of the Central States in the Reformed Episcopal Church and the Anglican Church in North America.

== Biography ==
Grote was born in 1973 to Royal and Ellen Grote. His father was a Reformed Episcopal priest who later became bishop of the Diocese of Mid-America and eventually presiding bishop of the REC. Grote was raised in Pennsylvania and New Jersey. He began his career as a bank teller and in bookkeeping, including in the Houston, Texas, area, where his father had moved to plant REC churches. In the mid-1990s, he experienced a call to ordained ministry and received his theological education at Reformed Episcopal Seminary. Ordained to the diaconate in 1998 and the priesthood in 2000, Grote was called as rector of St. Matthias Anglican Church in Katy in 2000, where he will continue to serve until he relocates to the Diocese of the Central States in 2026.

Grote married in 2004; he and his wife have two young adult children. He completed his undergraduate degree at the University of Houston Downtown in 2007, graduating with a Bachelor of Business Administration with a concentration in Computer Information Systems. In addition to serving as rector of St. Matthias, Grote has held several roles with the Diocese of Mid-America and the REC, including as treasurer of the diocese, Cranmer Theological House and the REC Board of Foreign Missions; and national canon missioner responsible for the REC's church planting initiative.

Grote was a candidate for suffragan bishop of the Diocese of Mid-America in 2023; ultimately, Charlie Camlin was elected. He was elected coadjutor bishop of the Diocese of the Central States in 2024 and consecrated by Ray Sutton at the Cathedral Church of the Holy Communion on June 4, 2025. On June 10, 2026, Grote succeeded Peter Manto as bishop of the Central States during the REC's General Council in Richmond, Virginia.

Religious titles
Preceded by Peter Manto	Bishop of the Central States; 2026–present	Incumbent
