= Daniel Morse =

American Anglican bishop (1944–2026)

The Right Reverend Daniel R. Morse
- Bishop Ordinary of the Central States
- Church: Anglican Church in North America; Reformed Episcopal Church
- Diocese: REC Central States
- In office: 2008–2019
- Successor: Peter Manto
- Previous posts: Suffragan Bishop, Diocese of Mid-America

Orders
- Consecration: August 23, 1996 by Leonard W. Riches

Personal details
- Born: 1944
- Died: June 27, 2026

Daniel Rogan Morse (1944 – June 27, 2026) was an American Anglican bishop. He was the first bishop ordinary of the Reformed Episcopal Church's Diocese of the Central States.

== Biography ==
Morse was married for 48 years to Marianne Porcher McCravey (1944–2015). They had four children. Morse was rector of Immanuel Church in Germantown, Tennessee. He also served as a convocation dean, standing committee member and dean of the external studies program at Cummins Theological Seminary.

In 1996, Morse was elected assistant bishop in the newly formed Diocese of Mid-America, which combined the Synod of Chicago and the eastern part of the Special Jurisdiction for North America. He was consecrated by Leonard W. Riches in Memphis, Tennessee, in August 1996.

After 12 years in the Diocese of Mid-America, Morse was elected the first bishop of the Missionary Diocese of the Central States. He took office in January 2008. In 2013, the DCS was given full status as a Reformed Episcopal and Anglican Church in North America diocese.

In 2016, Morse called for the election of a bishop coadjutor to succeed him upon retirement, and suffragan bishop Peter Manto was elected. At the end of 2019, Morse formally retired and was succeeded as bishop ordinary by Manto.

Anglican Communion titles
New title	I REC Bishop of the Central States; 2008–2019	Succeeded by Peter Manto
