= Synod of Chicago =

Synod of Chicago may refer to:

- The Metropolitan Chicago Synod of the Evangelical Lutheran Church in America
- The Synod of Chicago of the Reformed Episcopal Church, which merged into the Diocese of Mid-America
