= Peter Manto =

American Anglican bishop

The Right Reverend Peter F. Manto
- Bishop of the Central States
- Church: Anglican Church in North America; Reformed Episcopal Church
- Diocese: REC Central States
- In office: 2020–present
- Predecessor: Daniel Morse
- Successor: Jason Grote

Orders
- Consecration: December 6, 2013 by Robert Duncan

Personal details
- Born: 1950 (age 75–76)

Peter F. Manto (born 1950) is an American Anglican bishop. He was the second bishop ordinary of the Reformed Episcopal Church's Diocese of the Central States from 2020 to 2026.

== Early life, education, and career ==
Manto grew up in an Italian-American Catholic family and attended Catholic schools. He began his higher education at St. Bonaventure University and completed his degree in 1972 at Bowling Green State University in Ohio. While at BGSU, he converted to evangelical Protestantism and participated in the Jesus People movement. He became part of a nondenominational student prayer meeting on the BGSU campus, engaging in street evangelism, Bible study and prayer. This group in time organized as an independent church originally called Charis Community and by 1984 renamed Bowling Green Covenant Church.

Manto married his wife, Janice, in August 1974. They have four adult children and several grandchildren. He also remained involved with the church. Manto was working at an Ace Hardware warehouse when in 1977 he was asked to become a pastor at the church. Manto served as an associate pastor at the church until 1989, helping it to grow to 300 people in attendance and launch several church plants, as well as serving as the founding headmaster of Bowling Green Covenant Academy, the church's affiliated private school, from 1985 to 1989.

== Move into Anglicanism ==
In 1990, he became the founding pastor of a new Bowling Green Covenant Church plant: Trinity Church in Mason, Ohio, near Cincinnati. In 1995, he completed his seminary degree at Cincinnati Christian Seminary. Manto and his parishioners began to be attracted to the Anglican tradition for its liturgy, sacraments, episcopacy and Reformed theology. In 2001, Trinity Church and a fellow BGCC plant (Christ the King in Dayton, Ohio), began the process of reception into the Reformed Episcopal Church. Trinity Church was received as a full member of the REC Diocese of Mid-America in 2002.

In 2008, Trinity joined the newly formed REC Diocese of the Central States under Bishop Daniel Morse. Manto was elected bishop suffragan of the diocese and consecrated by Anglican Church in North America Archbishop Robert Duncan at Trinity Church in December 2013.

== Episcopacy ==
In 2017, Manto was elected bishop coadjutor, and on January 1, 2020, he succeeded as the second bishop ordinary following Morse's retirement. In 2021, he stepped down as rector of Trinity Reformed Episcopal Church and was replaced by the Rev. Matthew Joyner. Manto remains resident at Trinity REC when not traveling for episcopal duties, and Trinity REC is currently evaluating whether to apply for cathedral status in the Diocese of the Central States.

In 2023, Manto served as vice president of the REC's 150th anniversary General Council held in Charleston, South Carolina. In October 2023, he called for the election of a bishop coadjutor in 2024. Manto retired during the REC's General Council in Richmond, Virginia, in 2026 and was succeeded by Jason Grote.

Religious titles
Preceded by Daniel Morse	II REC Bishop of the Central States; 2020–2026	Succeeded by Jason Grote
