= Diocese of the Central States =

Anglican diocese in the United States

Location
- Ecclesiastical province: Anglican Church in North America

Statistics
- Parishes: 22 (2025)
- Members: 1,571 (2025)

Information
- Rite: Anglican

Current leadership
- Bishop: Jason Grote

Website
- The Diocese of the Central States Official Website

The Diocese of the Central States is a Reformed Episcopal Church and an Anglican Church in North America diocese. The diocese has 20 congregations in the American states of Alabama, Northwest Florida, Indiana, Kentucky, Ohio, North Carolina, Tennessee, Virginia and West Virginia. Daniel Morse became missionary bishop at the creation of the diocese in 2008, and he served as bishop ordinary until 2019. On January 1, 2020, Peter Manto became bishop ordinary of the diocese, with Daniel Morse retiring to become bishop emeritus.

== History ==
The diocese was launched on 1 January 2008 as the Missionary Diocese of the Central States, joining the Anglican Church in North America upon its creation in June 2009. When the diocese reached full diocesan status in the REC and the ACNA in 2011, the name was changed to Diocese of the Central States, after experiencing considerable growth in the previous three years. The first Synod took place 25 and 26 October 2011, at the Resurrection Anglican Church, in Shalimar, Florida.

== Bishops ==
Since 2008, the diocese has had three bishops ordinary:

1. Daniel Morse (2008–2019)
2. Peter Manto (2020–2026)
3. Jason Grote (2026–present)

== Parishes ==
In 2025, the diocese reported 22 congregations (up 10% from 2022), 1,571 members (up 33% from 2022) and an average Sunday attendance of 1,140 (up 59% from 2022). Notable parishes in the Diocese of the Central States include:

Church	Image	City	Year founded	Year completed	Notes
Church of Our Saviour, Oatlands		Leesburg, Virginia	1871	2016	Largest parish in the diocese by Sunday attendance
St. James Church		Memphis, Tennessee	2002	1941	National Register of Historic Places historic district contributing property
Trinity Anglican Church		Connersville, Indiana	2021	1859	Listed on the National Register of Historic Places
