= Calvin N. Otis =

American architect

- Born: Calvin Nicholas Otis; June 23, 1814; Onondaga County, New York, U.S.
- Died: January 22, 1883 (aged 68); Cuba, New York, U.S.
- Occupation: Architect

Calvin Nicholas Otis (June 23, 1814 – January 22, 1883) was an American architect from Buffalo, New York.

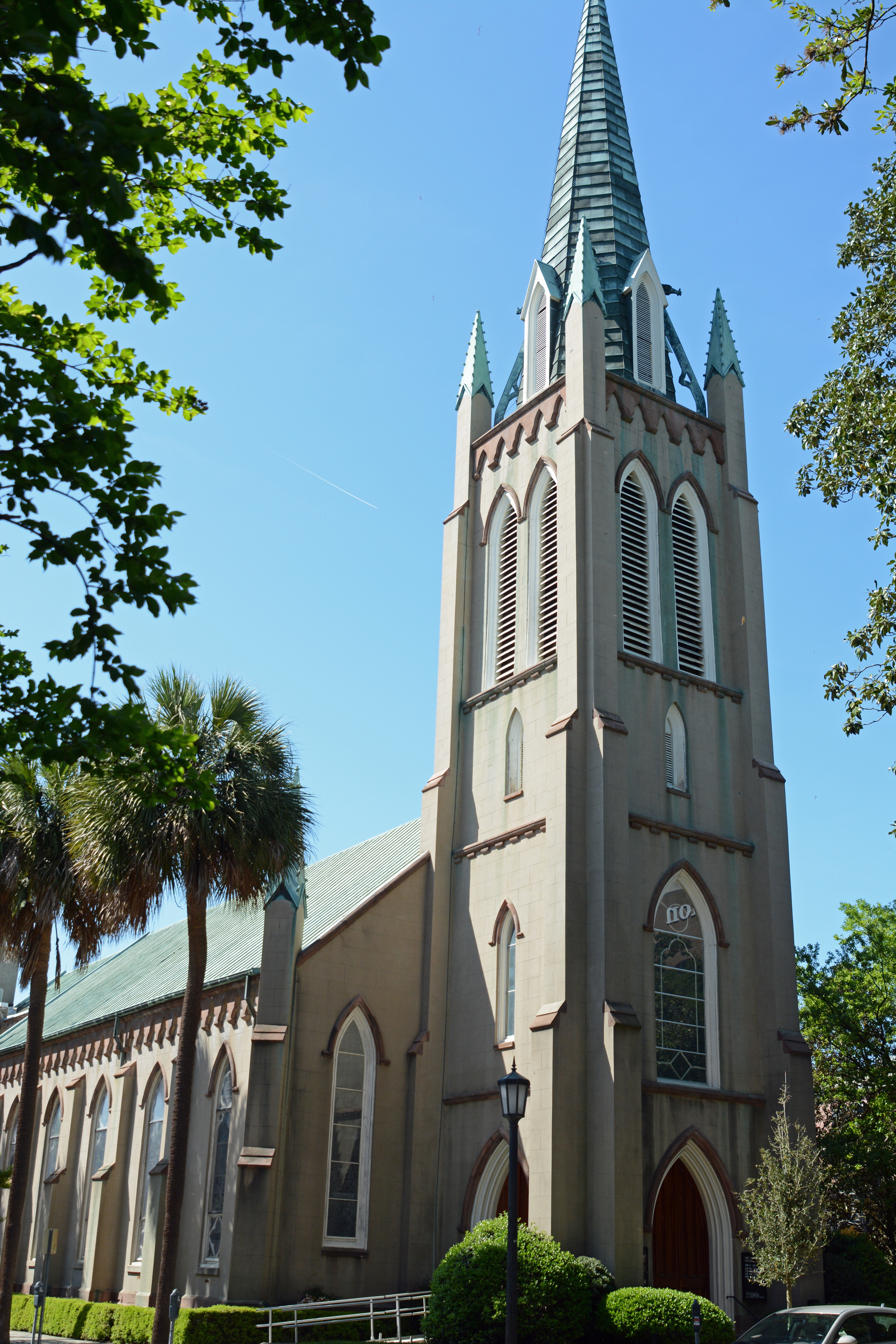
St. John's Episcopal Church, Savannah, Georgia

Otis was born on June 23, 1814, in Onondaga County. He designed St. John's Episcopal Church on Madison Square in Savannah, Georgia, in 1851, for which he received $500, the former New York State Arsenal in the Ellicott District of Buffalo, New York, the back wall of which still stands within the Broadway Auditorium, the Buffalo Medical College, and the Mariners' Church of Detroit.

In February 1862, during the American Civil War, he volunteered for the Union Army. He was commissioned as a major in the 100th New York Infantry Regiment, and in October 1862 he was promoted to lieutenant colonel. He commanded the unit in the taking of Folly Island and was brevetted brigadier general for his meritorious service. He was discharged in June 1863. Otis died in Cuba, New York, where he was living at the time, on January 22, 1883.

== See also ==
- List of American Civil War brevet generals (Union)
