= Peace Bridge Arena =

Indoor sports arena

Coordinates: 42.9078°N 78.9196°W

Peace Bridge Arena was the main sports arena located in Fort Erie, Ontario, Canada. Built in 1928, it held 5,000 people. It was located near the Peace Bridge connecting Fort Erie with Buffalo, New York. Both the Chicago Black Hawks and Pittsburgh Pirates made the arena a temporary home for the first few games of the 1928–29 National Hockey League (NHL) season.

The arena was also the home of the Buffalo Bisons ice hockey team; for a brief period in 1931, it also served as the backup arena for their crosstown rivals, the Buffalo Majors, who normally played at Broadway Auditorium. On March 17, 1936, the roof collapsed after thirteen inches of heavy snowfall, and the original hockey Bisons folded early in their 1936–37 season.

In 1940, Buffalo Memorial Auditorium (The Aud), located in Buffalo, replaced Broadway Auditorium; with it, a new Bisons team was established, operating in American Hockey League until the NHL expansion Buffalo Sabres moved into The Aud for the team's inaugural 1970–71 season.
