= Mariners' Church =

Historic church in Michigan, United States

Mariners' Church of Detroit
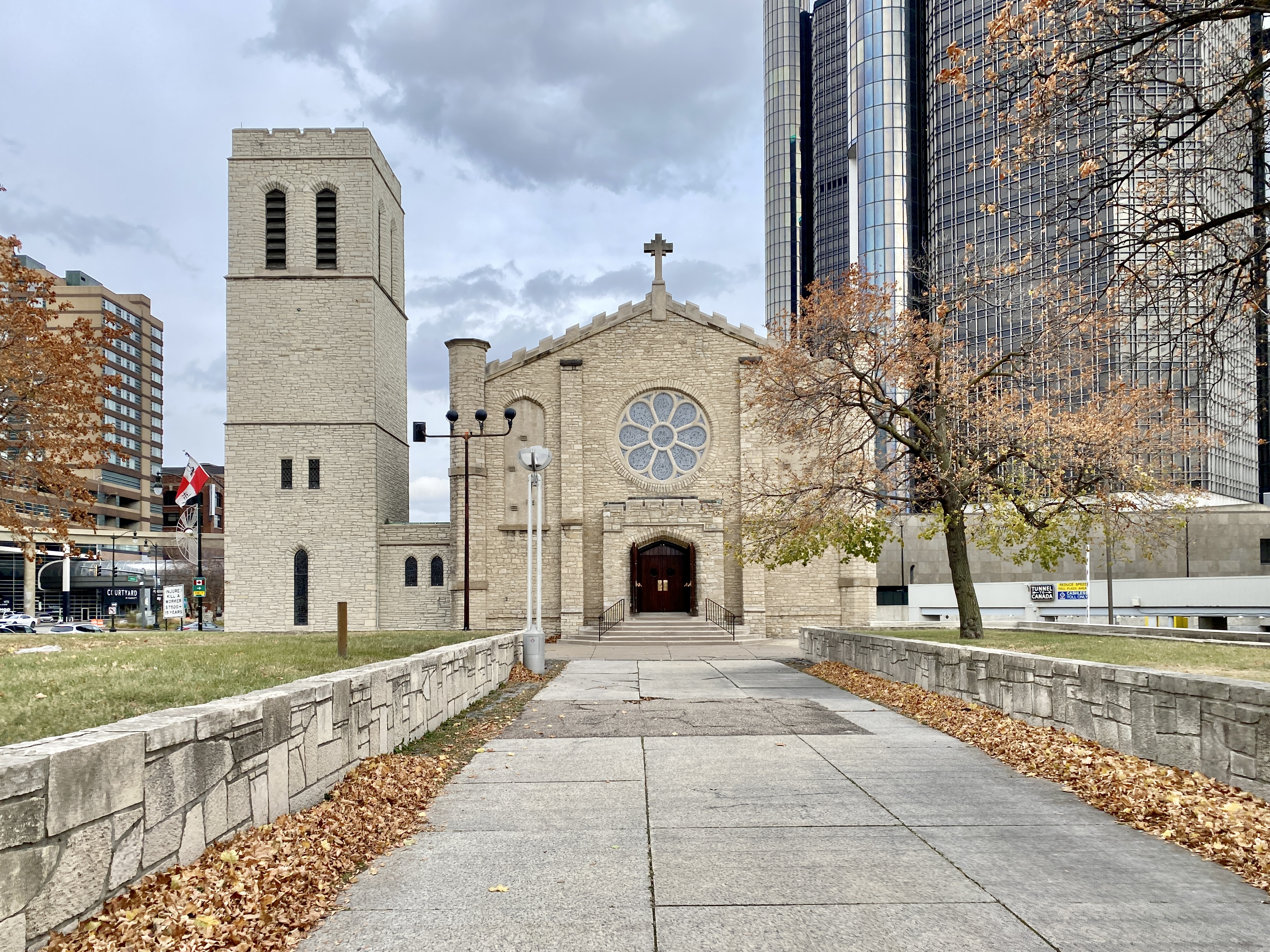
- Mariners' Church of Detroit
- Location: Detroit, Michigan
- Country: United States
- Denomination: Anglican Church in North America; Reformed Episcopal Church
- Website: marinerschurchofdetroit.org

History
- Founded: 1842
- Founder: Julia Anderson

Administration
- Diocese: Mid-America

Clergy
- Rector: Rev. Todd Meyer
- Mariners' Church
- U.S. National Register of Historic Places
- Michigan State Historic Site
- Location: 170 East Jefferson Avenue; Detroit, Michigan
- Coordinates: 42°19′45″N 83°2′31.5″W
- Built: 1849
- Architects: Calvin N. Otis; Hugh Moffat
- Architectural style: Gothic Revival
- NRHP reference No.: 71000428
- Added to NRHP: March 11, 1971

Mariners' Church of Detroit is a church with worship services adhering to Anglican liturgical traditions located at 170 East Jefferson Avenue in Downtown Detroit. It was founded in 1842 as a special mission to the maritime travelers of the Great Lakes and functioned as a parish of the Episcopal Diocese of Michigan until 1992, when the Michigan Court of Appeals ruled it was incorporated as an independent congregation. The church was listed on the National Register of Historic Places in 1971. The church has a non-exclusive, limited association with the REC Diocese of Mid-America which itself is a founding member of the Anglican Church in North America.

The church grounds contain a bronze sculpture of George Washington wearing the apron of a master mason by Donald De Lue. The sculpture is a copy of the wax original created in 1959 and was installed in 1966. The statue belongs to the City of Detroit, not the church; the site was chosen because it is the location of the first Council House in Detroit.

== History ==
=== 19th century ===
The church was founded as a result of Julia Anderson's bequest of the lot on which her own mansion stood, at the corner of Woodbridge and Woodward streets. The completion of the Erie Canal increased shipping traffic in the area, and Anderson felt that the seamen were in need of spiritual support and care. Mariners' was established in 1842 and incorporated in the state of Michigan in 1848; the present structure was consecrated the following year.

The original wood-frame church was sold to the congregation of Historic Trinity Lutheran Church for $200 when the current structure was completed. The Trinity congregation moved the building to Larned and Rivard streets.

Prior to the Civil War, the church was a stop on the Underground Railroad which black slaves followed North to Canada and freedom. In 1925, the church established Mariners' Inn, a shelter that now offers rehabilitation, counseling and vocational services for homeless substance abusers.

=== 20th century ===
The church was slated for demolition along with many neighboring structures in 1955 to make room for the new civic center. Trustee and The Detroit News columnist George Stark urged his readers to help save the historic building and asked for small contributions of $5 or $10 to move the 60,000 pounds (27,000 kg) limestone edifice 880 feet (270 m) east. The undertaking was detailed in the April 25, 1955, issue of Life magazine. Stark's appeal raised enough money to cover moving costs with money left to add stained glass windows, a west entry and a tower and to redecorate the interior of the church. During the move, workers discovered a tunnel under the building from its days as a stop on the Underground Railroad. It now sits atop part of the Detroit–Windsor Tunnel.

The new site for the church on Jefferson Avenue was where the Indian Council House was constructed after the 1805 fire. The house was used for meetings with local tribes and the first Protestant worship services in Detroit. It later was the site of the Army Corps of Engineers Topographical Corps offices. The office was established by Col. John Anderson, husband of Julia Anderson, Mariners' benefactress.

=== Affiliation ===
In August 1990, the Episcopal Diocese of Michigan filed a lawsuit claiming jurisdiction over Mariners' Church as a parish within the Episcopal Church. Mariners' Church held that it is an independent congregation free of denominational ties, while the Episcopal Church held that it had always considered the church an Episcopal congregation. The courts ruled in favor of Mariners' Church in the initial case in 1990 and an appeal in 1992.

The Church uses the 1662 and American 1928 editions of the Book of Common Prayer. For many years from the 1950s through the 1980s, services were broadcast on radio station WWJ (AM).

== Architecture ==
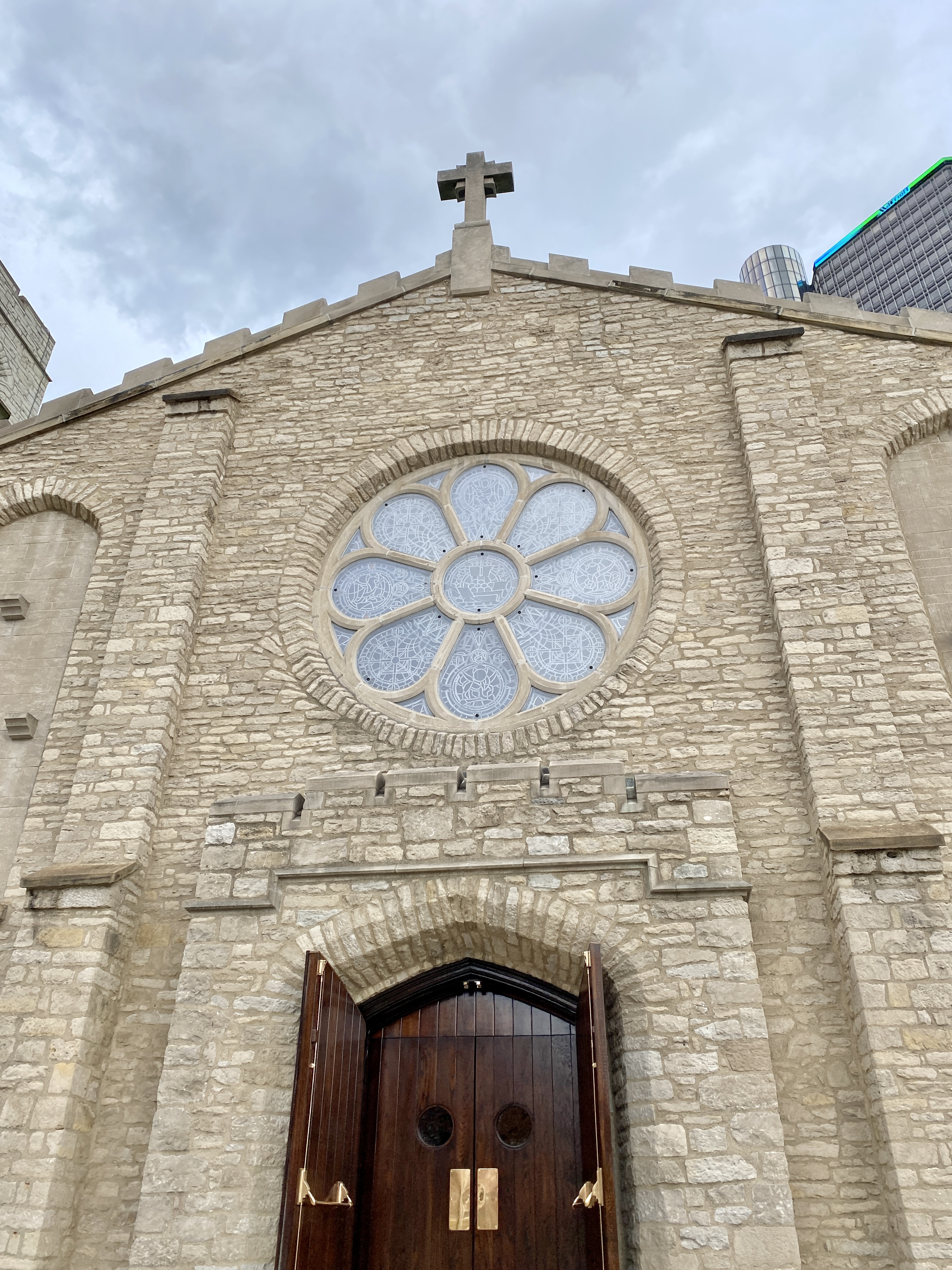
Detail of the facade

The Mariners' Church building is constructed of Lannon stone from Wisconsin, in the perpendicular gothic style of Gothic Revival architecture. It replaced an earlier wood structure on the same site. It measures 49 ft (15 m) by 94 ft (29 m).

The east and west walls are divided into three bays by flat buttresses and the south wall into seven. The east wall contains a large window with gothic tracery above the chancel, measuring 15 ft (4.6 m) wide by 25 ft (7.6 m) high, and is flanked by a smaller window on each side. At each corner of the structure is an octagonal buttress. The buttresses on the east wall were originally capped by small stone spires and a cross capped the peak of the gable above the chancel window. The west wall contains a 12 ft (3.7 m) diameter rose window, above which was a small bell tower.

In its original location, the north and west sides of the building abutted other structures and were not visible until the 1955 move. As part of the renovations in the new location, a new bell tower was added and the north wall, which now fronts Jefferson Avenue, was reconstructed to resemble the south wall and windows added.

=== Interiors ===
The ground floor which currently holds church offices and meeting rooms originally housed commercial tenants to provide income. The first tenants were the Post Office and bank and later occupants include a grocery, barber and laundry. Prior to its relocation, the main entrance to the church was also on the ground floor under the vestibule.

=== Sanctuary ===
The sanctuary is 43 ft (13 m) by 75 ft (23 m) with an organ gallery at the rear. The ceiling is wood with exposed beams artificially grained to resemble oak. The walls are covered by a fabric-backed vinyl.

The 1849 pipe organ was installed by the Garret House Organ Company of Buffalo. This was replaced in 1966 by an organ given by architect Ralph Calder in memory of his wife, Helen. In 2007, D. F. Pilzecker & Company installed an organ with 78 ranks of pipes to replace the 1966 instrument.

The stained glass windows were created by the J&R Lamb Studios of New York City in 1955. The rose window on the west facade was a gift of the Browning family, in memory of their mother Bertie Ann Browning. Replicating a ship's compass, the window is an appropriate tribute inasmuch as the Browning family was associated with shipping on the Great Lakes through the Browning Steamship Co. and owned the Bob-Lo Boats and Bob-Lo Island. The windows on the side walls contain scenes from the history of Detroit and the Bible.

=== 1971 renovations ===
In 1971, a second phase of renovations expanded the Chancel area; restored and refinished the Altar, Reredos, pews and floor; upgraded lighting, sound and electrical systems; covered sanctuary walls with vinyl; replaced the wooden tracery of the rose window with stone; installed an air conditioning system; and painted exterior woodwork.

== Commemorating those lost on the Lakes ==
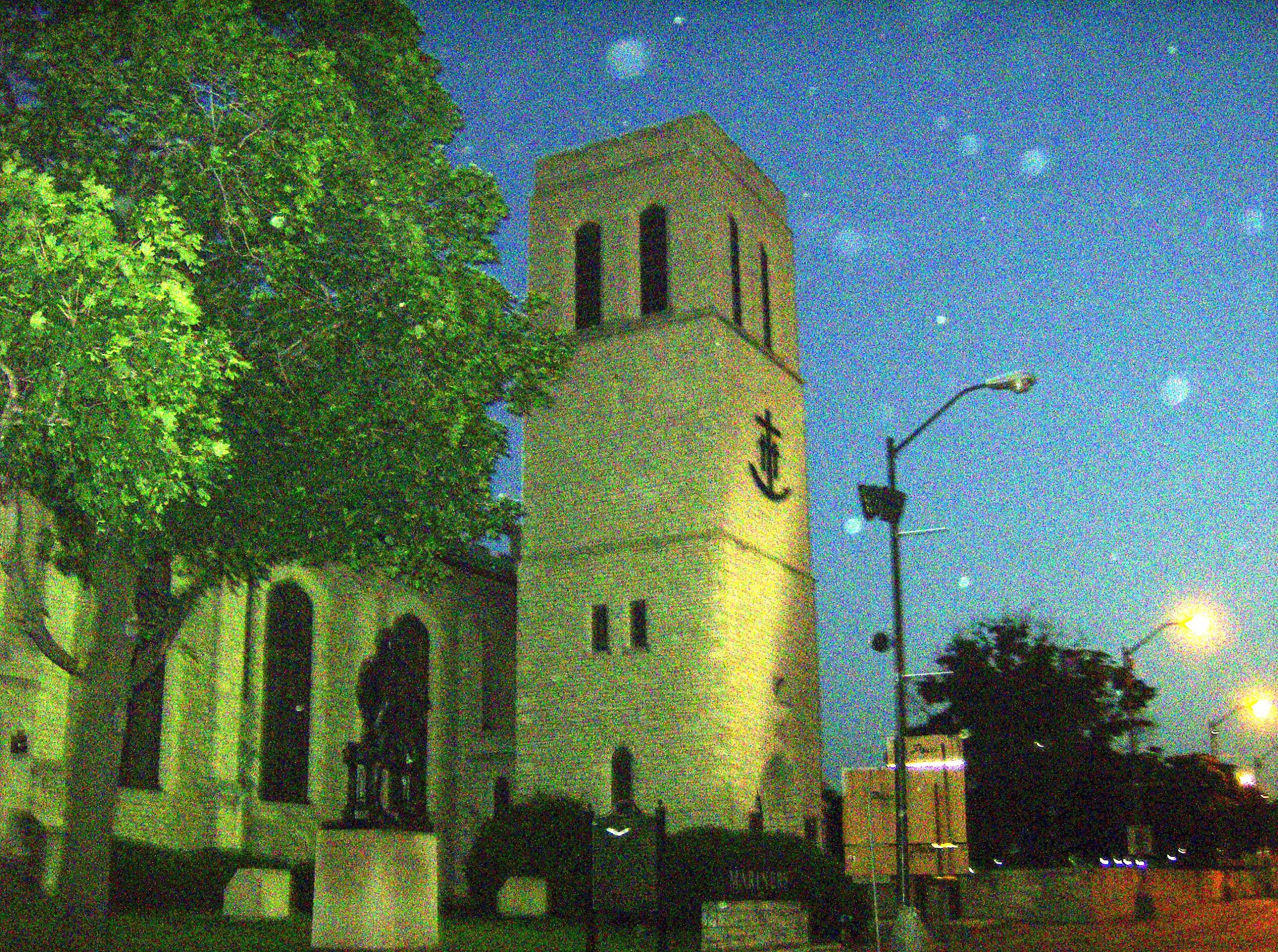
Jefferson Avenue façade of Mariners' Church, on a rainy night

Established to serve mariners, the church holds a Blessing of the Fleet every March for those going out on the Great Lakes, and a Great Lakes Memorial Service every November for those who have lost their lives on the Great Lakes.

The church's bell tolled 29 times in November 1975 to mourn the loss of the freighter Edmund Fitzgerald; once for each of her 29 crew members. The church continued to hold an annual memorial, reading the names of the crewmen and ringing the church bell until 2006. In 2006, the bell was tolled eight times, instead: "five times for the Great Lakes, a sixth time for the St. Clair and Detroit rivers, a seventh for the St. Lawrence Seaway and an eighth time for military personnel whose lives were lost."

The church is mentioned in Gordon Lightfoot's song "The Wreck of the Edmund Fitzgerald": "In a musty old hall in Detroit, they prayed in the Maritime Sailors' Cathedral. The church bell chimed 'til it rang, 29 times, for each man on the Edmund Fitzgerald." In 1985, Lightfoot performed the ballad at the tenth memorial service for the Edmund Fitzgerald. After viewing the sanctuary, Lightfoot proclaimed to the congregation that he wrote the song under a false impression and would in future performances refer to the church as a "...rustic old hall..." On May 2, 2023, the day after Gordon Lightfoot's death, the church's bell tolled 30 times, once for each of the Edmund Fitzgerald's 29 crew members and once in memory of Lightfoot.

On November 12, 2006, two days after the 31st anniversary of the sinking of the Edmund Fitzgerald, the church broadened its memorial ceremony to include the more than 1,000 lives lost on the Great Lakes. In 2006, the bell at Mariners' Church tolled eight times, not the usual 29: five times for the five Great Lakes, a sixth time for the St. Clair and Detroit rivers, a seventh for the St. Lawrence Seaway, and an eighth time for military personnel who died.

== Rectors ==
- Horace Hills 1849–?
- Rufus Murray 1856–?
- Alfred Lee Brewer 1859–?
- A. M. Lewis 1865–?
- E. W. Flower 1872–?
- William Charles 1877–?
- Paul Ziegler 1855–1915
- Hubert W. Wells 1915–1917
- Harry C. Robinson 1917–1921
- John H. Lever 1921–1925
- Harry I. Pearson 1925–1929
- George Backhurst 1929–1942
- David R. Covell 1942–1946
- G. Paul Musselman 1946–1953
- Elmer B. Usher 1956–1964
- Richard W. Ingalls Sr. 1965–2006
- Richard W. Ingalls Jr. 2006–2012
- William Fleming 2013–2018
- Jeff Hubbard 2018–2022
- Todd Meyer 2023–present

From 1925 to 1957, Mariners' Church did not have regular services; instead, the Rector served as Superintendent of Mariners' Inn.

== Gallery ==
Historical images of Mariners Church in original location on Woodward Avenue and Woodbridge.
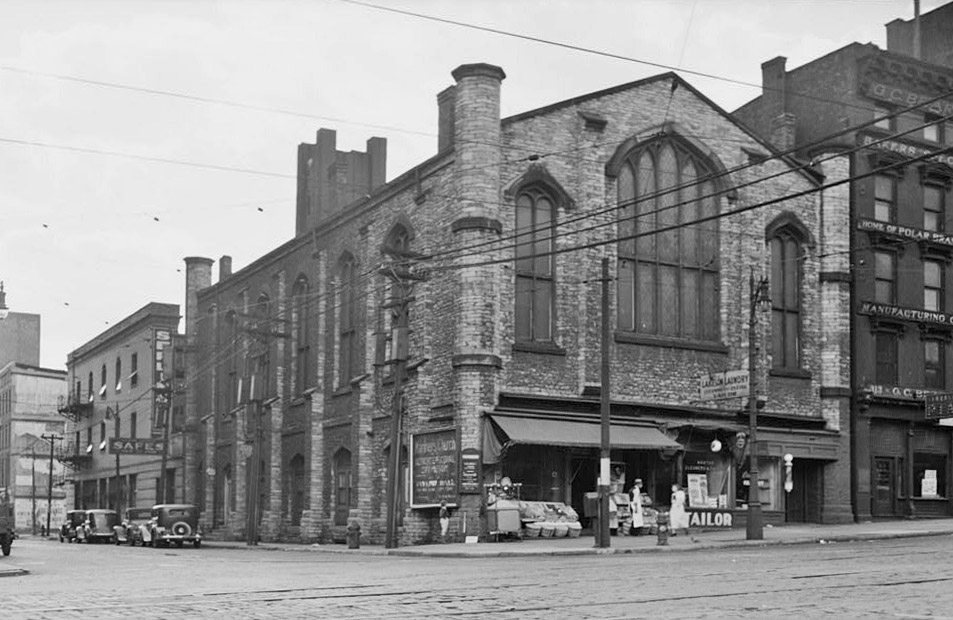
Looking northwest from Woodbridge and Woodward Avenue

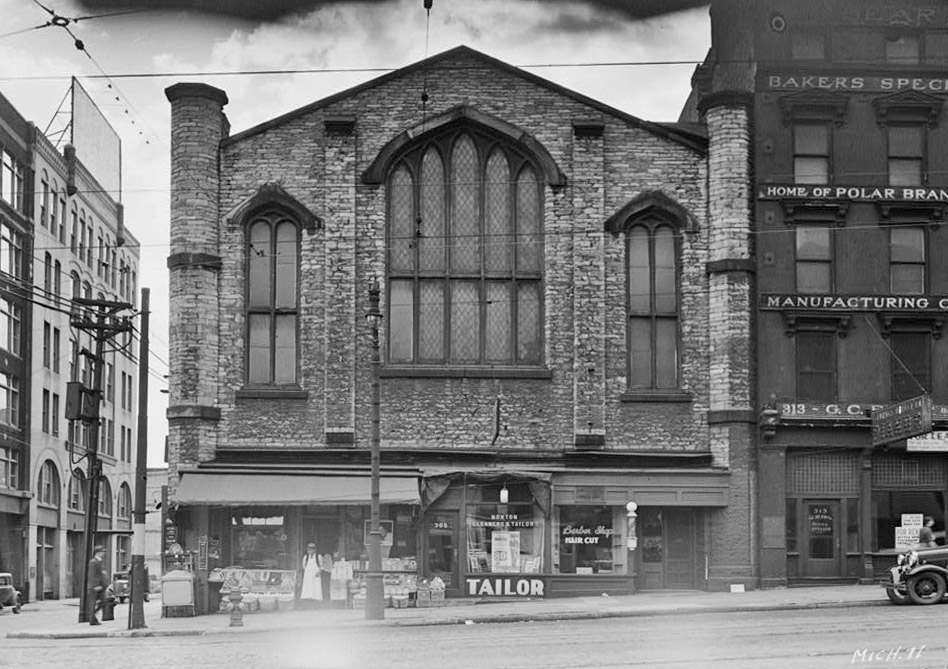
Woodward Avenue (east) facade

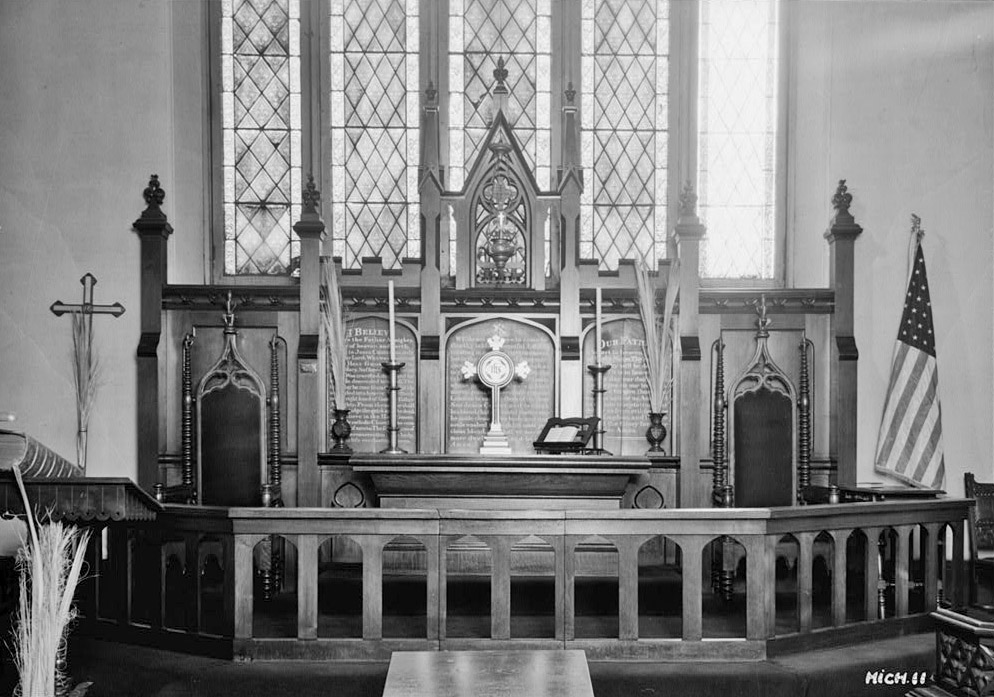
Church Altar prior to 1955 move, and installation of new stained glass windows
