= Charles E. Cheney =

American clergyman (1836–1916)

- Presiding Bishop of the Reformed Episcopal Church
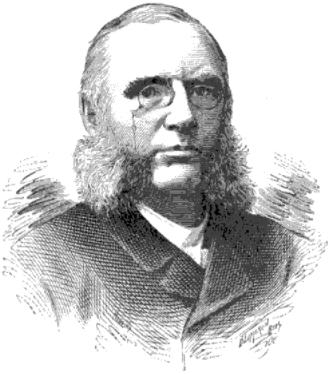
- Church: Reformed Episcopal Church
- In office: 1876–1877 and 1887–1889

Orders
- Ordination: 1858 (diaconate); 1859 (priesthood) by William Heathcote DeLancey

Personal details
- Born: February 12, 1836 Canandaigua, New York, US
- Died: November 15, 1916 (aged 80) Chicago, Illinois, US
- Education: Hobart College

Charles Edward Cheney (February 12, 1836 – November 15, 1916) was an American clergyman and second bishop of the Reformed Episcopal Church (REC).

== Life ==
Charles E. Cheney was born in Canandaigua, New York, on February 12, 1836. A graduate of Hobart College in Geneva, New York, he studied at Virginia Theological Seminary before ordination to the diaconate and priesthood by William Heathcote DeLancey in 1858 and 1859 respectively. Soon after his ordination he became rector of Christ Church, Chicago, where he served from 1860 until his death in 1916.

Cheney's opposition to the baptismal regeneration of infants resulted in ecclesiastical censure by Bishop Henry J. Whitehouse of Chicago. Cheney was consecrated bishop by George David Cummins at Christ Church, Chicago, Illinois, on December 14, 1873. He succeeded Cummins as Presiding Bishop of the Reformed Episcopal Church, serving in this capacity from 1876–1877 and 1887–1889. As an REC bishop, he also founded St. Paul's Reformed Episcopal Church in 1875.

== See also ==
- List of bishops of the Reformed Episcopal Church

Religious titles
New title	Bishop Ordinary of the Synod of Chicago; 1875–1916	Succeeded by Samuel Fallows
Preceded by George David Cummins	Presiding Bishop of the Reformed Episcopal Church; 1876–1877	Succeeded by Samuel Fallows
Preceded by James A. Latane	Presiding Bishop of the Reformed Episcopal Church; 1887–1889	Succeeded by Samuel Fallows
