= St. Paul's Reformed Episcopal Church =

Former Reformed Episcopal congregation in Chicago

- Bishop Fallows Memorial Church
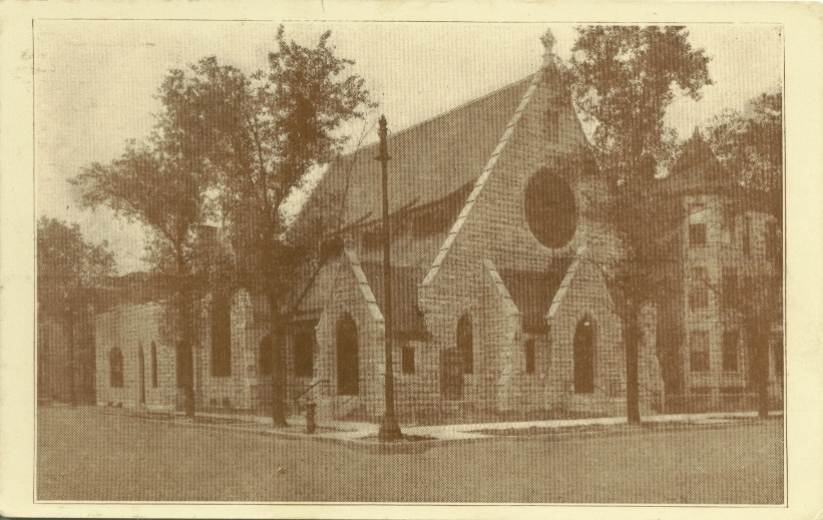
- St. Paul's c. 1927
- St. Paul's Reformed Episcopal Church
- 41°52′43″N 87°40′32″W
- Location: Chicago, Illinois
- Country: United States
- Denomination: Reformed Episcopal Church

History
- Founded: 1875
- Founder: Charles E. Cheney
- Dedicated: 1886

Architecture
- Style: Gothic Revival
- Years built: 1885–1886
- Construction cost: $38,000 ($1.36 million in 2025)
- Closed: 1973

Specifications
- Capacity: 500
- Materials: Limestone

Clergy
- Rector: Samuel Fallows (1875–1922)

St. Paul's Reformed Episcopal Church was a prominent congregation of the Reformed Episcopal Church (REC) on the West Side of Chicago, Illinois, United States.

Established by Bishop Charles E. Cheney in 1875, only two years after the REC's founding, the congregation was led by Samuel Fallows, a Union Army brevet brigadier general, educator and Methodist minister who had joined the REC, from 1875 until his death in 1922. Starting in 1932, St. Paul's was also known as the Bishop Fallows Memorial Church. The congregation built a Gothic Revival stone church on the West Side in 1886, where it housed a day school in addition to its services.

Amid white flight to Chicago's suburbs in the 1940s, the congregation's membership declined rapidly, although the remaining members were sharply divided about whether to stay in the neighborhood or sell their building. In 1950, after the church leaders and a majority of members sold the building to West Side Community Church, a predominantly black church, several members physically obstructed the new owners from entering, resulting in police response and litigation. St. Paul's moved to a suburban location, eventually combining with another Reformed Episcopal church until formally dissolving in 1973. West Side Community Church continues to hold services in the former St. Paul's building.

== History ==
=== Rectorate of Samuel Fallows ===
St. Paul's history is traced to January 1875, when Cheney, then pastor of Christ Reformed Episcopal Church, began holding services on the West Side. The congregation formally organized after Easter 1875 with at least 40 families taking part. The church initially met in rented space on the West Side and that summer called Samuel Fallows as its first rector. By 1876, the church had 180 families, 300 communicant members and a Sunday school with 250 students. Fallows would remain as rector for 47 years while also serving as presiding bishop of the Reformed Episcopal Church on multiple occasions.

St. Paul's purchased the Third Presbyterian Church at West Washington and North Carpenter and met there until the congregation completed a new stone Gothic Revival building at West Adams and South Winchester in October 1886. Shortly after its opening, the church was damaged in a fire that started in the basement. Damages to the organ totaled $6,000 ($215,000 in 2025). Sunday school was in session at the time of the fire, but there were no injuries.

In the early 20th century, Fallows and the church gained prominence for their role in the Emmanuel Movement, which promoted clergy participation in providing therapy for mental illness. Fallows died on September 5, 1922, after 47 years as rector.

=== Later history ===
St. Paul's Church was dedicated as a memorial to Fallows in 1932. Around this time, the church was remodeled through a series of bequests. As part of that remodeling, in 1933, rector Martineau Darnell set up two pulpits in the church, one dedicated to preaching and the other to talks from "distinguished leaders in the realm of science," according to The New York Times, which said that "[t]he rector and vestry of St. Paul's are inviting science and scientists into the church as a distinct adjunct to the worship of deity. . . . Although never departing from the teachings and principles of Christ, this new church movement will seek an interpretation of life to the end that man may realize his innate divinity and enjoy the fullness of life, according to the rector." Darnell's time as rector was short, spanning from his REC ordination in 1933 until 1935, when it was discovered that he had been ordained under a false name. Under his birth name, James Morrison Darnell, he had been defrocked as a Unitarian minister in 1915 for having three wives and spent three years in Leavenworth Penitentiary after a conviction under the Mann Act. The discovery scandalized St. Paul's, and Darnell resigned as rector.

The church opened a day school in 1937. In 1948, another fire in the basement that caused $3,000 ($40,201 in 2025) in damage was attributed to overheated furnace pipes.

During the 1940s, membership at St. Paul's dropped from over 500 to just 60 as white flight took place in inner-city Chicago. The church saw disputes within its membership about how to respond to the changing neighborhood, with some wishing to stay in the building while others sought to sell the building and relocate. In 1946, several church members sued the vestry over allegations of misappropriated funds and sought an injunction to prevent the vestry from selling the building to a predominantly black church.

In 1950, with the support of Bishop Frank V. C. Cloak and rector Emanuel Emanuel, a majority of the church members voted to sell the church to a black congregation, but attempts by the buyers to move in were legally and physically obstructed by several members who opposed the sale. The rector had four members arrested for a sit-down strike in which they refused to leave the building. In turn, members who objected to the sale obtained an arrest warrant for the rector on charges of disorderly conduct for refusing to surrender the keys to their faction in the congregation. Emanuel said the majority of the church supported the sale.

On August 6, 1950, Chicago police were called to the church to calm a fight that broke out when members of St. Paul's blocked Pastor Horace Hayden and members of the West Side Community Church from holding services in the building. Police refused to let either group worship there. The transaction closed on August 8. Later that week, Emanuel was summoned for contempt of court for failing to provide information to the judge. The following Sunday, members of St. Paul's again blocked the entrances so that Hayden and his parishioners could not enter the building they had closed on the Tuesday before. The two factions worshiped separately for a time while the litigation proceeded. West Side Community Church's ownership of the building was eventually recognized.

The St. Paul's faction that remained affiliated with the Reformed Episcopal Church moved to the suburban village of Niles, where it met until 1967. In 1967, the congregation sold its property in Niles as a private residence and began holding services jointly with St. John's REC in the Austin neighborhood. Its final minister stepped down in 1968. In 1973, the congregation formally dissolved.

== Architecture ==
The building was designed in Gothic Revival style and faced with random-coursed limestone. The interior of the church, which seated 500, featured wood trim in natural colors.

The cornerstone was laid in February 1886 and it was completed later that year. An attached chapel of 1,400 square feet (130 m^{2}) was completed in January 1886.

As of 2024, the building was extant and operating as West Side Community Church. It is located near the United Center and operations of the church are affected by events that take place there.
