= St. James Church (Memphis, Tennessee) =

Anglican church in Memphis, Tennessee, US

Coordinates: 35.1191°N 89.9488°W

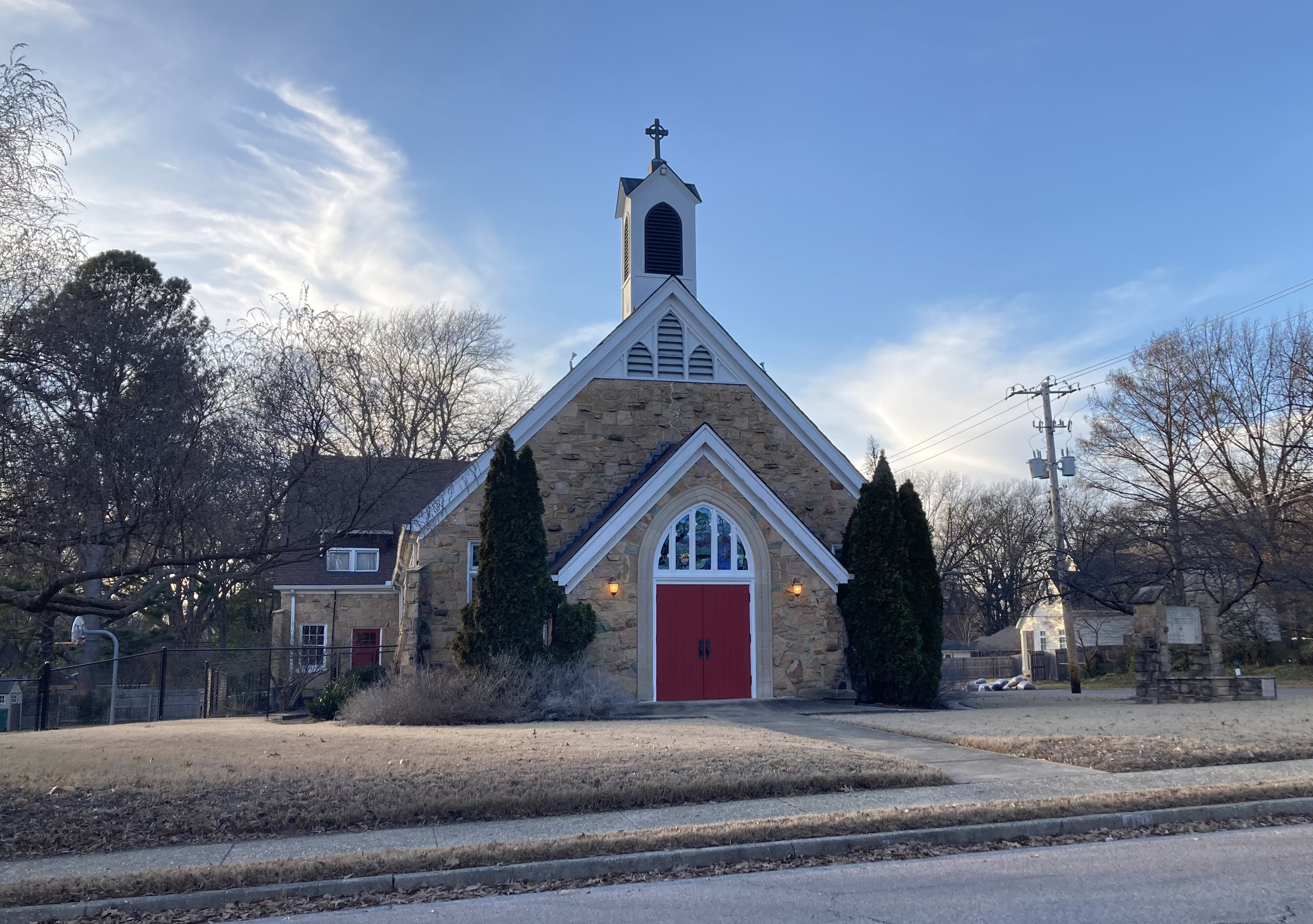
- St. James Church in 2025
- Location: Memphis, Tennessee
- Country: United States
- Denomination: Anglican Church in North America; Reformed Episcopal Church
- Website: stjamesmem.org

History
- Founded: c. 2002

Specifications
- Length: 76 feet (23 m)
- Width: 34 feet (10 m)

Administration
- Diocese: Central States

Clergy
- Rector: The Rev. Keith Boettner
- East Side Cumberland Presbyterian Church
- U.S. Historic district – Contributing property
- Built: 1941
- Part of: East Buntyn Historic District (ID95001332)
- Added to NRHP: November 22, 1995

St. James Church is a Reformed Episcopal parish in Memphis, Tennessee. Founded c. 2002, since 2005 it has been located in the former East Side Cumberland Presbyterian Church, which is a contributing property to the East Buntyn Historic District.

== History ==
The East Side Cumberland Presbyterian Church was organized as a tent meeting in the East Buntyn area of Memphis in 1926 and erected a building at Midland Avenue and South Prescott Street. The congregation dedicated the current sanctuary in 1941, at which point its previous building became a Sunday school wing.

The East Side congregation split in 1972 when its pastor of eight years, Bobby Scobey, began speaking in tongues during Saturday night prayer meetings in the church's manse. The session of the church objected to glossolalia and dismissed Scobey, who formed an independent church with several East Side members. The local presbytery of the Cumberland Presbyterian Church admonished Scobey for starting an independent church and he later withdrew from the church.

St. James was organized as a Reformed Episcopal congregation and began meeting c. 2002, holding services in a wedding chapel on Park Avenue in Memphis. St. James purchased and moved into the former Presbyterian church at Prescott and Midland in 2005.

== Architecture ==
The church was designed in the English Gothic parish church style and faced with Tishomingo stone in an uncoursed pattern. The church is laid out in a cruciform plan with a cross-gable roof. The church's front door is in the Tudor style with an arched stone surround and a stained glass transom.
