= Broadway Auditorium =

Former multipurpose arena in Buffalo, New York

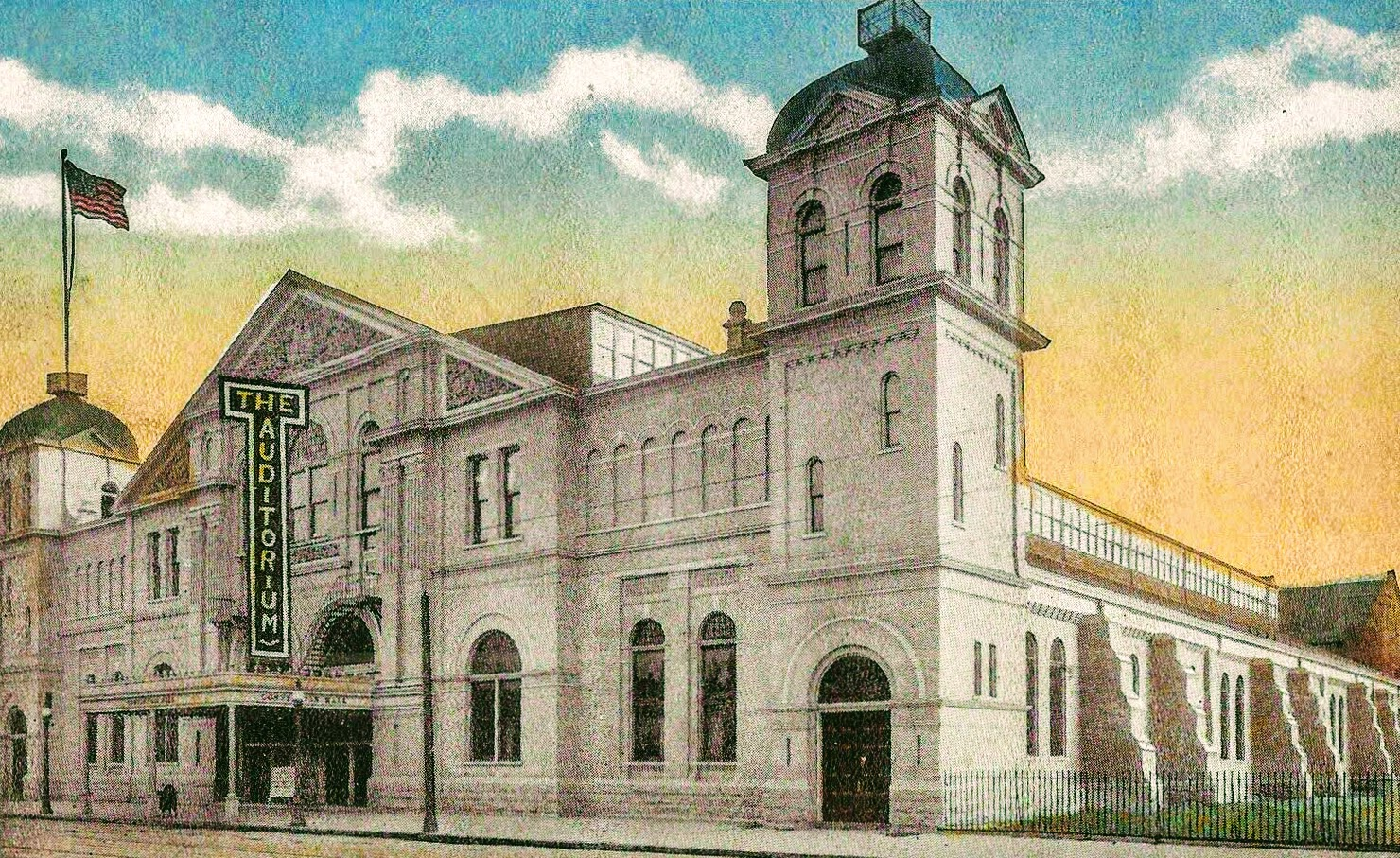
- Exterior of the venue, circa 1914
- Interactive map of Broadway Auditorium
- Former names: Broadway Arsenal (1858–1883, 1908–1912); Sixty-Fifth Regiment Armory (1884–1907); Broadway Auditorium (1913–1940)
- Address: 201 Broadway
- Location: Buffalo, New York
- Coordinates: 42°53′12.6″N 78°51′57.9″W
- Owner: City of Buffalo
- Capacity: 12,000
- Field size: 47,000 sq ft (4,400 m^{2})
- Acreage: 5.3 acres (2.1 ha)
- Public transit: Lafayette Square

Construction
- Groundbreaking: May 5, 1858
- Opened: May 19, 1913
- Renovated: 1912, 1936, 1948
- Expanded: 1884
- Closed: June 28, 1940
- Cost: US$45,000 (1858) ($1.67 million in 2025 dollars); US$25,025 (1884) ($896,729 in 2025 dollars); US$64,000 (1912) ($2.14 million in 2025 dollars); US$115,000 (1936) ($2.67 million in 2025 dollars); US$1,400,000 (1948) ($18.8 million in 2025 dollars)
- Architects: Calvin N. Otis (1858); George J. Metzker (1884); Robert J. Reidpath (1912)
- Main contractors: William F. Felton (1912); WPA (1936); W.F. Hendrich Company (1948)

Tenants
- Buffalo Majors (AHA) 1931; Buffalo Bowmans (IPLL) 1932; Canisius Golden Griffins (NCAA) 1936–1939; Buffalo Bisons (NBL) 1937–1938

Broadway Auditorium is a former multipurpose arena in Buffalo, New York. It was part of a complex that first opened as Broadway Arsenal in 1858 to accommodate the 65th and 74th Regiments of the New York National Guard. The facility was expanded in 1884 with the addition of a drill hall and administration building to become the Sixty-Fifth Regiment Armory. The armory was decommissioned in 1907, and the City of Buffalo opened the vacant drill hall as Broadway Auditorium in 1913.

Broadway Auditorium was home to the Buffalo Majors (AHA), Buffalo Bowmans (IPLL), Canisius Golden Griffins (NCAA) and Buffalo Bisons (NBL). It hosted notable events including the Six Days of Buffalo (1910–1940), NBA Tournament (1911), ABC National Tournament (1914, 1921, 1925 and 1931), NYSPHSAA Basketball Championship (1927), and the World Championship Series (1931–1939). Jimmy Slattery fought at the venue 73 times in his Hall of Fame boxing career, highlighted by his 1930 win over Lou Scozza to become NYSAC Light Heavyweight Champion.

After closing in 1940, the complex was used as barracks for the 712th Military Police Battalion during World War II. The former auditorium began serving as public works storage facility Broadway Garage (known colloquially as Broadway Barns) after the arsenal was demolished in 1948. Following renovations slated to begin in 2024, the building will reopen as a sports complex.

== History ==
=== Planning and construction ===
Broadway Arsenal was designed by architect Calvin N. Otis and constructed in 1858. The $45,000 facility was funded by New York State to accommodate the 65th and 74th Regiments of the New York National Guard. The Niagaras of Buffalo, a baseball team playing in the National Association of Base Ball Players, began using the arsenal grounds as a practice field in 1865. The 74th Regiment moved to Virginia Street Armory in 1868.

New York State funded the facility's conversion to the Sixty-Fifth Regiment Armory in 1884, adding a drill hall and administration building at a cost of $25,025.75. Major George J. Metzker of the 65th Regiment designed and oversaw construction of both the drill hall and administration building. President-elect Grover Cleveland dedicated the new drill hall during a ceremony on January 13, 1885.

The armory was decommissioned on February 1, 1907, when the 65th Regiment moved to newly built Masten Avenue Armory.

=== Opening and reception ===
The City of Buffalo acquired the former armory in 1908 and began using the drill hall for public gatherings. Buffalo Common Council had rejected a proposal to reopen the facility as Technical High School in favor of using it as a convention hall. The city formally opened the drill hall portion of the complex as Broadway Auditorium on May 19, 1913. Dedication festivities lasted several days, and included a speech by New York Governor William Sulzer and concert performance by tenor Charles Morati.

A soft opening had commenced in 1912 while the building underwent $64,000 in renovations, which included the addition of a lighted marquee, bleacher seating, and a stage that could accommodate big band orchestras. Robert J. Reidpath designed the building's new roof, which added clerestory windows for lighting and ventilation. William F. Felton, who had constructed many of the buildings for the Pan-American Exposition, completed the masonry work.

=== Alterations ===
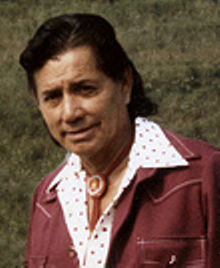
Harry Smith

The venue was host to the Six Days of Buffalo series of six-day racing events between 1910 and 1940. Champions of the event included future United States Bicycling Hall of Fame members Reggie McNamara (1915) and Cecil Yates (1939 and 1940). Future Canada's Sports Hall of Fame members Doug Peden and William Peden teamed to win the event in 1937.

The building was home to the Buffalo Majors of the American Hockey Association in 1931. The team featured future Hockey Hall of Fame member Moose Goheen, and would move to Peace Bridge Arena the following season.

The venue was home to the Buffalo Bowmans of the Indoor Professional Lacrosse League in 1932. The Bowmans were the first box lacrosse team in the United States, and featured future Canadian Lacrosse Hall of Fame member Harry Smith. Smith would later find fame as an actor, using the stage name Jay Silverheels.

Canadian Lacrosse Hall of Fame inductee Ross Powless recounted during a speech how Smith acquired the nickname "Silverheels" while playing for the Buffalo Bowmans:

Judy "Punch" Garlow told me how Harry got the name Silverheels. One time the boys won new white lacrosse shoes for playing good and Harry ran so fast in them new white shoes, all you could see was flashes of white at his heels. I guess they couldn't very well call him Whiteheels, him being Mohawk and all, so they called him Silverheels.

Renovations were carried out by the Works Progress Administration in 1936 to make the venue more suitable as a convention hall. The $115,000 project included the installation of gallery seating, and a wooden floor that could accommodate basketball.

The Canisius Golden Griffins men's basketball team of the NCAA called the venue home from 1936 to 1939.

The venue was home to the Buffalo Bisons of the National Basketball League for the 1937–1938 season. The team featured future Naismith Memorial Basketball Hall of Fame member Al Cervi.

=== Closing ===
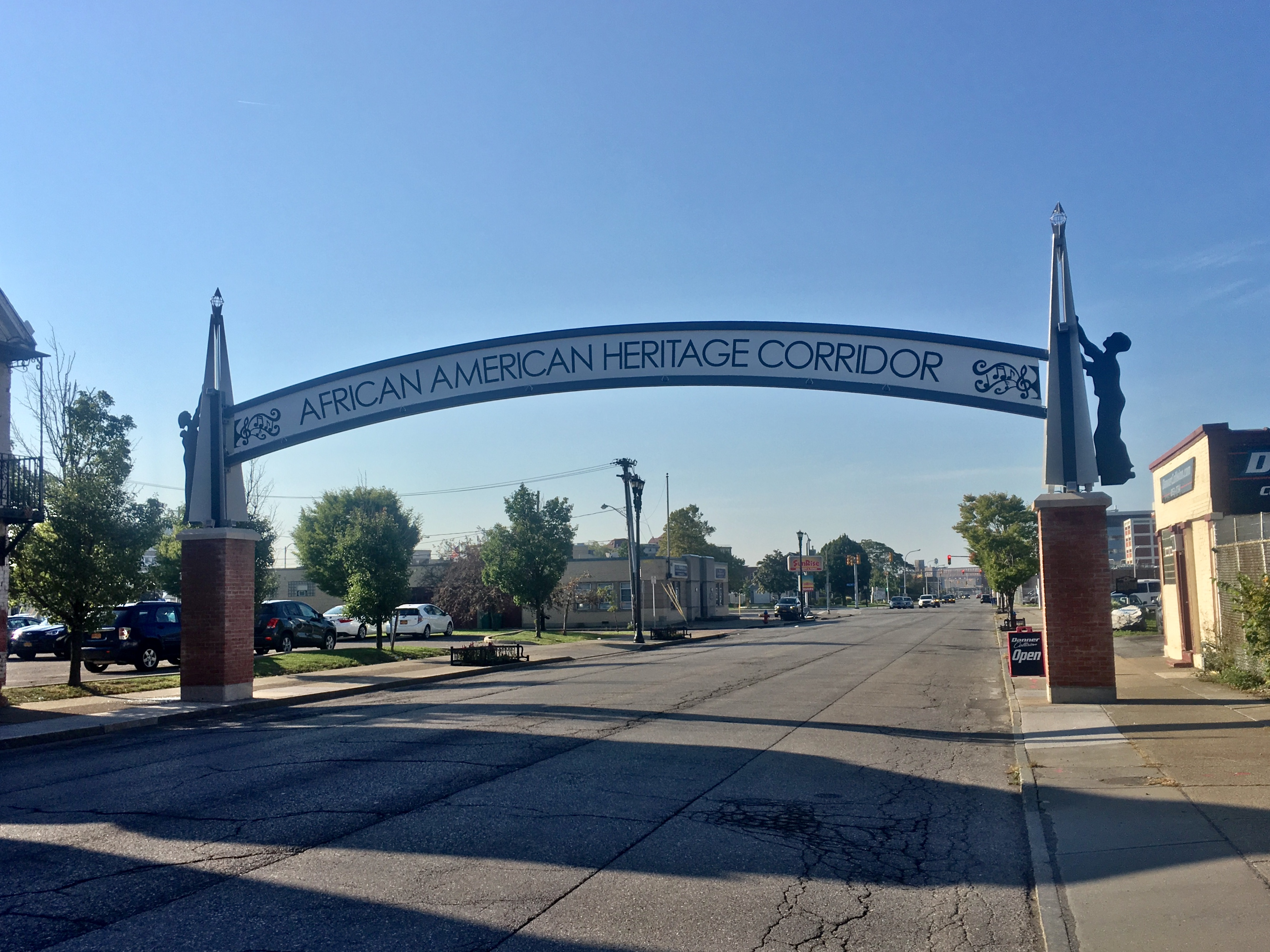
Michigan Street African American Heritage Corridor

In 1940, the venue was rendered obsolete by the newly built Buffalo Memorial Auditorium.

The vacant complex was recommissioned in support of World War II as barracks for the 712th Military Police Battalion. This came after a 1941 proposal for converting the auditorium to Defense Homes Corporation housing for Semet-Solvay Company workers was rejected by Republican politicians and local business leaders, as the housing would not have maintained racial segregation.

An accidental fire heavily damaged the original arsenal building on August 30, 1948, while it was undergoing renovations. The arsenal was then demolished so that garage doors could be added to the auditorium for accommodation of public works vehicles. The only surviving feature of the arsenal remains its original concrete portal that connected it to the rear of the auditorium. Architecture that made up the exterior of the auditorium, including its original façade, was encapsulated behind yellow colored brick as part of the $1,400,000 project. The building was renamed Broadway Garage in 1948 when the City of Buffalo began using it for public works storage.

=== Reopening ===
Competing interests often discussed either demolishing or restoring the facility. The building was nearly condemned by the New York State Department of Labor in 2001. In 2022, the City of Buffalo placed the 5.3 acre property out to bid for private redevelopment.

It was announced in 2023 that the former auditorium would be renovated into a year-round sports complex, with a cultural center and affordable housing constructed on the former arsenal grounds.

The former auditorium is recognized as the world's oldest surviving structure that has hosted professional ice hockey, and has been targeted for historic preservation. Preservation Buffalo Niagara has a pending application with the City of Buffalo for the site to be declared a local landmark within the Michigan Street African American Heritage Corridor. Nearby landmarks in the Willert Park neighborhood including the Colored Musicians Club, Michigan Street Baptist Church and Rev. J. Edward Nash Sr. House are listed on the National Register of Historic Places.

== Notable events ==
=== Bowling ===
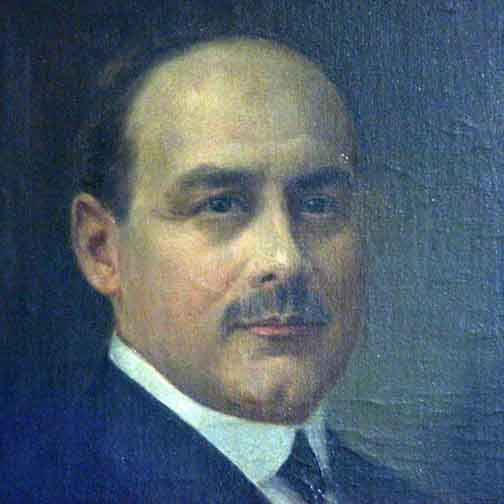
Louis P. Fuhrmann

The venue hosted the 5th Annual National Bowling Association Tournament in March 1911, which was won by Joseph West who defeated 1,451 other competitors. Mayor Louis P. Fuhrmann rolled the Ceremonial First Ball to open the event.

The venue hosted the 14th Annual American Bowling Congress National Tournament in March 1914, which was won by Larry Sutton who defeated 450 other competitors.

The venue hosted the 21st Annual American Bowling Congress National Tournament in March 1921, which was won by Fred Smith who defeated 940 other competitors.

The venue hosted the 25th Annual American Bowling Congress National Tournament in March 1925, which was won by Al Green who defeated 2,200 other competitors.

The venue hosted the 31st Annual American Bowling Congress National Tournament in March 1931, which was won by Walter Lachowski who defeated 2.639 other competitors.

=== Boxing ===
Jimmy Slattery

WBA World Heavyweight Champion Jack Dempsey defeated Jimmy Darcy in a 4-round boxing exhibition at the venue on July 24, 1922, to win the inaugural NYSAC Heavyweight Title.

Rocky Kansas defeated Jimmy Goodrich at the venue on December 7, 1925, lasting 15 rounds to become World Lightweight Champion by unanimous decision before a crowd of 12,000.

George Godfrey defeated Larry Gains by corner stoppage at the venue on November 8, 1926, to win the vacant World Colored Heavyweight Championship.

Jimmy Slattery defeated Lou Scozza by majority decision during a February 10, 1930 boxing card at the venue, lasting 15 rounds to win the vacant NYSAC Light Heavyweight Title. The contest drew 11,000 fans and is considered Buffalo's Greatest Fight of the 20th Century.

Future World Heavyweight Champion Joe Louis defeated Young Stanley Ketchel by knockout in a boxing exhibition at the venue on January 11, 1937.

Bob Pastor defeated Charley Eagle by unanimous decision in the venue's final event on June 28, 1940. The bout had been scheduled for Civic Stadium, but was moved to the auditorium due to cold weather.

=== Concerts ===
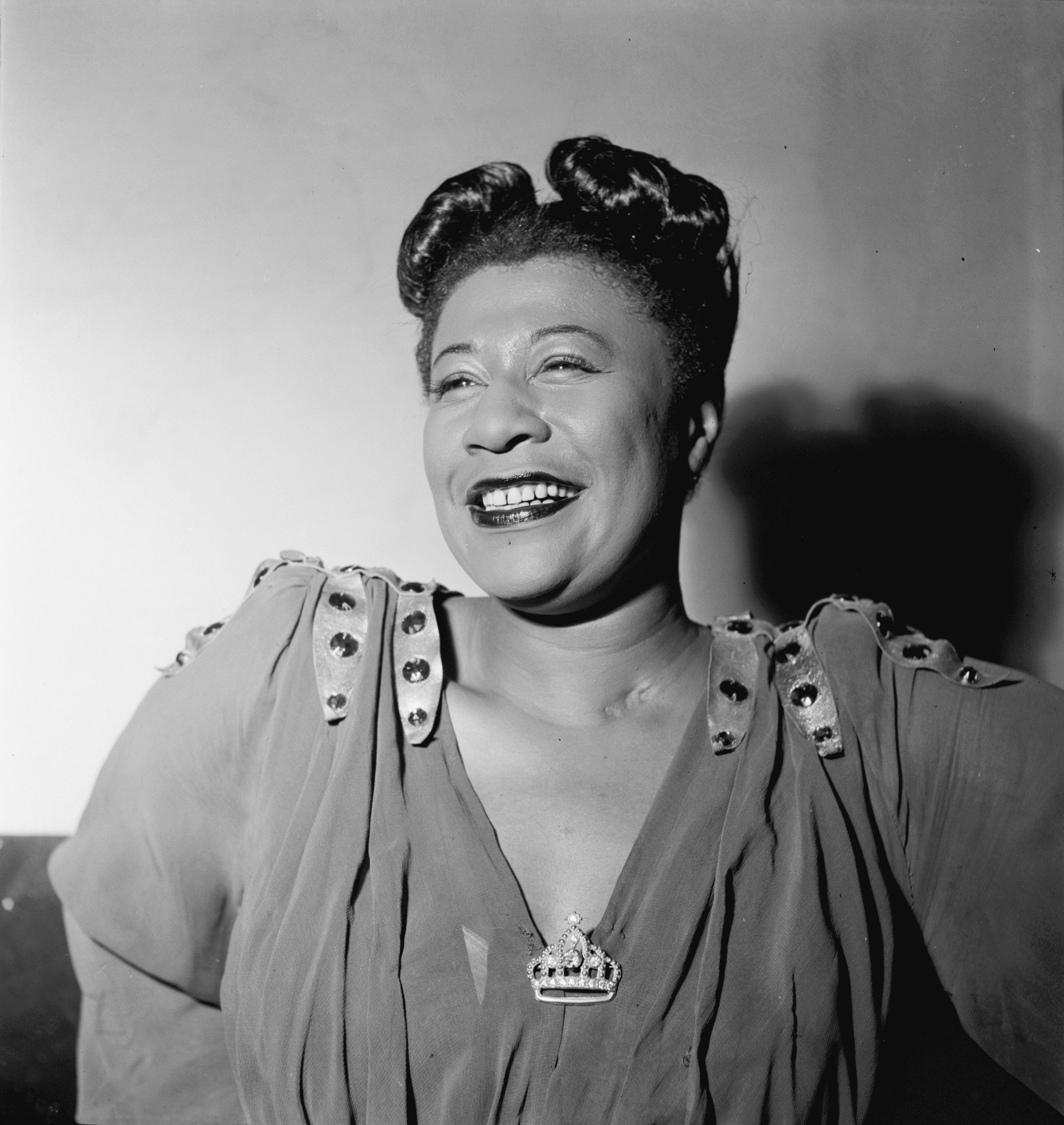
Ella Fitzgerald

The venue featured concerts by acts including Artie Shaw, Cab Calloway, Count Basie, Ella Fitzgerald, Enrico Caruso, Jimmie Lunceford, John Philip Sousa, Mamie Smith, Nina Morgana, Paul Whiteman and Sistine Chapel Choir.

Free concerts featuring local acts such as the Buffalo Philharmonic Orchestra were regularly held on Sundays.

The venue was host to the annual Lew Horschel Barn Dance, a themed gala to benefit local charities that transformed the auditorium into a rural village. Horschel was the resident concessionaire for Broadway Auditorium and other local entities including Erie County Fair.

=== High school ===
The inaugural Interscholastic Indoor Championship, a multisport competition between local high schools, was staged at the venue on March 28, 1919. Buffalo Enquirer sponsored the event, and Hutchinson High School was awarded the Enquirer Cup for their victory.

The venue was host to the NYSPHSAA Basketball Championship on March 26, 1927, that saw Yonkers Middle High School defeat Elmira Free Academy 26–24 to win the state title.

=== Hockey ===
The Buffalo Majors won their inaugural game at the venue on January 25, 1931, by defeating the Duluth Hornets 3–2 in overtime before 7,000 fans. It was the first professional hockey game played in the city, and Mayor Charles E. Roesch dropped the ceremonial first puck.

=== Political ===
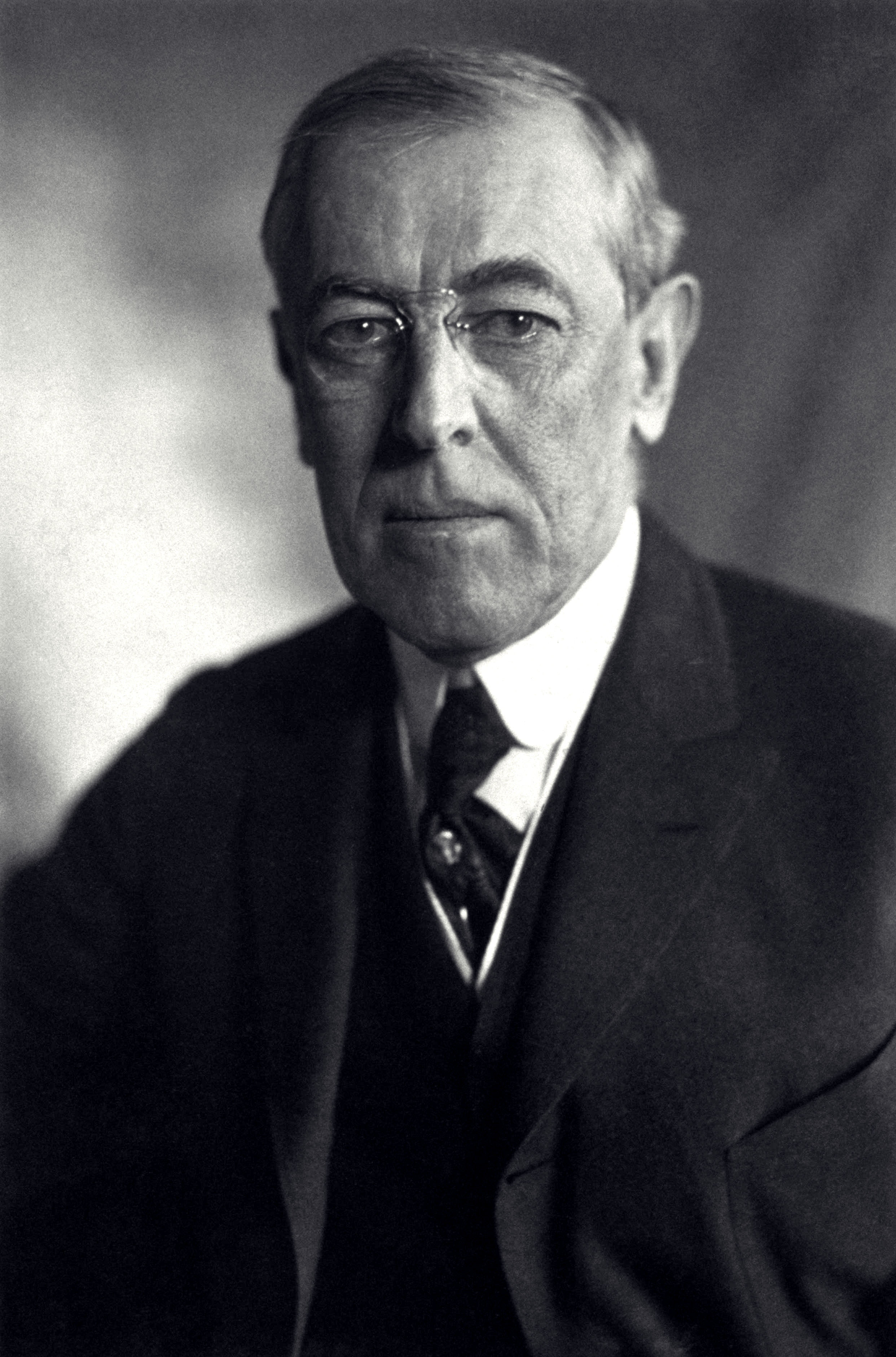
Woodrow Wilson

Adolph von Steinwehr lay in state within the arsenal after he died while visiting Buffalo in 1877.

Governor Charles Evans Hughes spoke before a crowd of 13,000 at the venue on October 22, 1908, as part of his reelection campaign for the 1908 New York state election.

William Howard Taft spoke at the venue on October 30, 1908, as part of his campaign for the 1908 United States presidential election.

Theodore Roosevelt spoke before a crowd of 7,000 at the venue on November 1, 1910, in support of the gubernatorial candidacy of Henry L. Stimson for the 1910 New York state election.

Woodrow Wilson spoke at the venue on September 2, 1912, as part of his campaign for the 1912 United States presidential election.

Eugene V. Debs spoke before a crowd of 6,000 at the venue on October 22, 1912, as part of his campaign for the 1912 United States presidential election.

Charles Seymour Whitman spoke at the venue on October 24, 1914, as part of his gubernatorial campaign for the 1914 New York state election.

Governor Martin H. Glynn spoke before a crowd of 7,000 at the venue on October 27, 1914, as part of his reelection campaign for the 1914 New York state election.

Governor Charles Seymour Whitman spoke at the venue as an invited guest of the Buffalo Industrial Show on September 22, 1915.

Charles Evans Hughes spoke before a crowd of 10,000 at the venue on September 30, 1916, as part of his campaign for the 1916 United States presidential election.

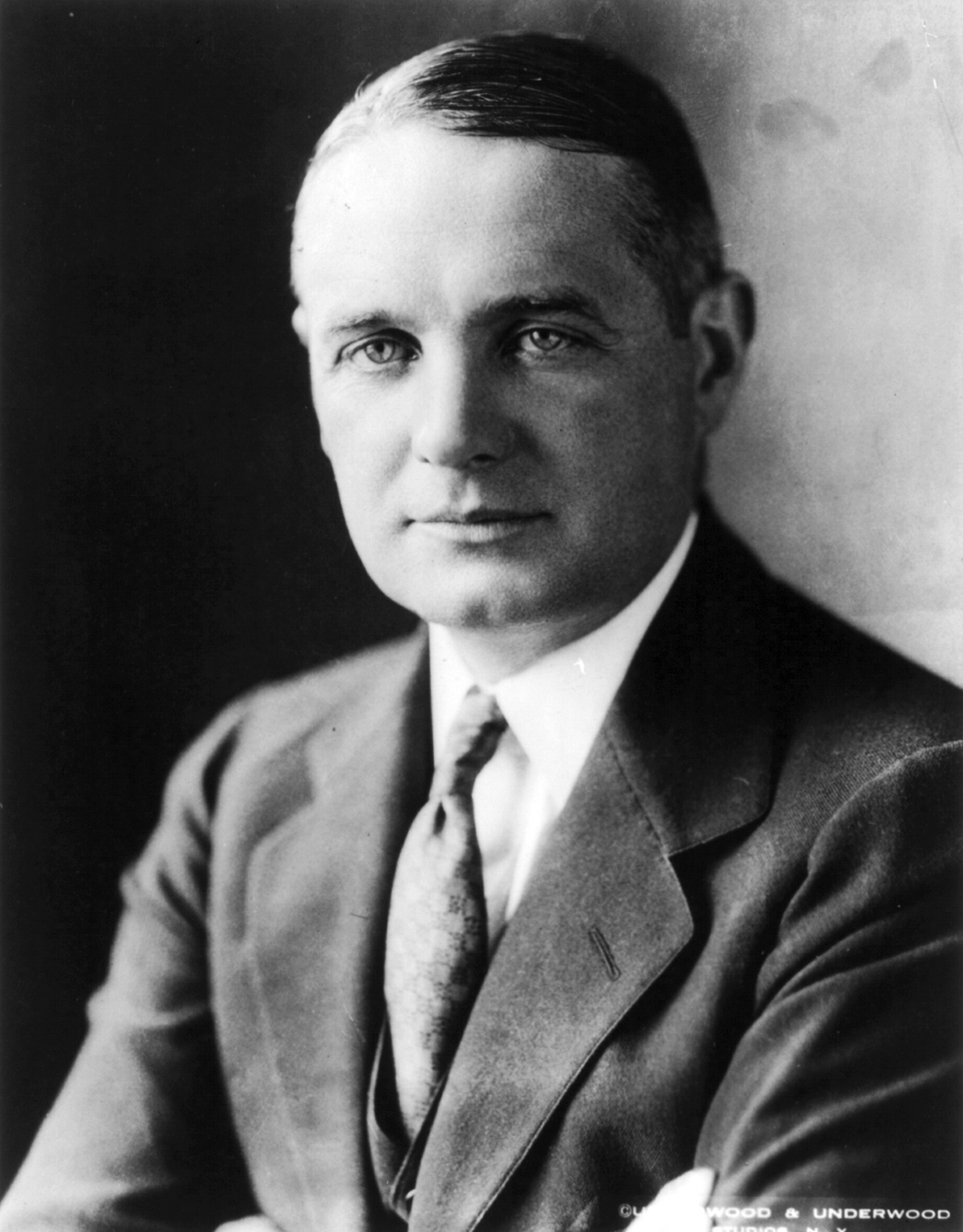
William J. Donovan

President Woodrow Wilson spoke before a crowd of 13,000 at the venue on November 1, 1916, as part of his reelection campaign for the 1916 United States presidential election.

President Woodrow Wilson spoke at the venue as an invited guest of the 37th-annual American Federation of Labor convention on November 12, 1917.

James M. Cox spoke before a crowd of 12,000 at the venue on October 18, 1920, as part of his campaign for the 1920 United States presidential election.

Warren G. Harding spoke at the venue on October 21, 1920, as part of his campaign for the 1920 United States presidential election.

Governor Al Smith spoke before a crowd of 8,000 at the venue on October 23, 1920, as part of his reelection campaign for the 1920 New York state election.

Éamon de Valera spoke before a crowd of 8,000 at the venue on December 22, 1920, as part of his tour of America.

John W. Davis spoke before a crowd of 7,500 at the venue on October 8, 1924, as part of his campaign for the 1924 United States presidential election.

Theodore Roosevelt Jr. spoke at the venue on October 15, 1924, as part of his gubernatorial campaign for the 1924 New York state election.

William J. Donovan accepted the Republican nomination for governor at the venue on May 9, 1932, to launch his campaign for the 1932 New York state election.

=== Professional wrestling ===
Tom Jenkins defeated Dan McLeod at the venue on April 3, 1903, to capture the American Heavyweight Championship.

Steve Casey defeated Ed Don George at the venue on November 3, 1939, to capture the AWA World Heavyweight Championship before a crowd of 4,906.

=== Tennis ===
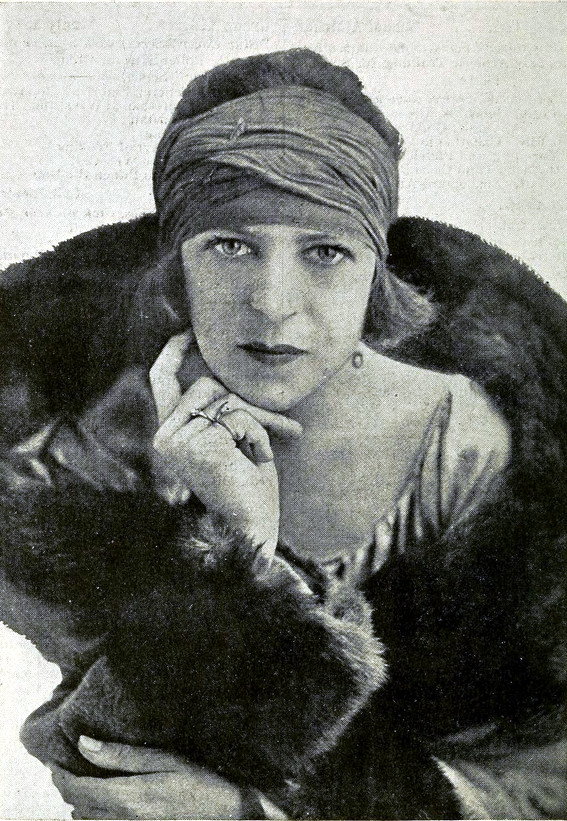
Suzanne Lenglen

Suzanne Lenglen defeated Mary Browne by scores of 6–2, 6–2 and Vincent Richards defeated Paul Féret by scores of 6–4, 6–4 at the venue on October 26, 1926, as part of the Suzanne Lenglen North American Tour.

Bill Tilden defeated Karel Koželuh at the venue in 1931 as part of their World Championship Series tennis tour by scores of 8–6, 6–3, 6–4.

Bill Tilden defeated Hans Nüsslein at the venue on February 26, 1932, as part of their World Championship Series tennis tour by scores of 6–4, 6–4.

Ellsworth Vines defeated Bill Tilden at the venue on April 1, 1934, as part of their World Championship Series tennis tour by scores of 8–10, 6–3, 11–9.

Ellsworth Vines defeated Lester Stoefen by scores of 8–6, 8–6 and Bill Tilden tied George Lott with scores of 7–9, 6–3 at the venue on January 23, 1935, as part of their World Championship Series tennis tour. The match between Tilden and Lott was ended prematurely so both competitors could catch their train.

Fred Perry defeated Ellsworth Vines at the venue on January 20, 1937, before a crowd of 8,167 as part of their World Championship Series tennis tour by scores of 6–4, 6–8, 6–2. Perry led the series 4 matches to 3 at the end of the night.

Fred Perry defeated Ellsworth Vines at the venue on April 27, 1938, as part of their World Championship Series tennis tour by scores of 6–2, 1–6, 8–6. Vines led the series 35 matches to 27 at the end of the night.

Don Budge defeated Ellsworth Vines at the venue on January 20, 1939, as part of their World Championship Series tennis tour by scores of 8–6, 1–6, 6–4. Budge led the series 9 matches to 4 at the end of the night.

Don Budge defeated Fred Perry at the venue on May 1, 1939, as part of their World Championship Series tennis tour by scores of 6–1, 2–6, 6–2. Budge led the series 21 matches to 8 at the end of the night.

Events and tenants
Preceded by Inaugural	Host of the Six Days of Buffalo; 1910 – 1940	Succeeded by Buffalo Memorial Auditorium
Preceded by Garage Building	Host of the NBA Tournament; 1911	Succeeded by Paterson Auditorium
Preceded by Terminal Auditorium; Peoria Coliseum; Second Regiment Armory; Public Hall	Host of the ABC National Tournament; 1914; 1921; 1925; 1931	Succeeded by Peoria Coliseum; Terminal Auditorium; Armory; State Fair Coliseum
Preceded by Syracuse University	Host of the NYSPHSAA Basketball Championship; 1927	Succeeded by Rensselaer Polytechnic Institute
Preceded by Inaugural	Host of the World Championship Series; 1931 – 1939	Succeeded by Buffalo Memorial Auditorium
Preceded by Inaugural	Home of the Buffalo Majors; 1931	Succeeded by Peace Bridge Arena
Preceded by Inaugural	Home of the Buffalo Bowmans; 1932	Succeeded by –
Preceded by Elmwood Music Hall	Home of the Canisius Golden Griffins; 1936 – 1939	Succeeded by Buffalo Memorial Auditorium
Preceded by Inaugural	Home of the Buffalo Bisons; 1937 – 1938	Succeeded by –
