= Henry Harris (ice hockey) =

Canadian ice hockey player

- Born: April 28, 1905 Kenora, Ontario, Canada
- Died: December 31, 1975 (aged 70) Winnipeg, Manitoba, Canada
- Height: 5 ft 11 in (180 cm)
- Weight: 175 lb (79 kg; 12 st 7 lb)
- Position: Left wing
- Shot: Left
- Played for: Boston Bruins
- Playing career: 1928–1934

Henry Hiram "Smoky" Harris (April 28, 1905 – December 31, 1975) was a Canadian professional ice hockey player. Harris played in the Prairie Hockey League (PHL), Pacific Coast Hockey League (PCHL) and the National Hockey League (NHL). Harris played 32 games for the Boston Bruins during the 1930–31 season, which had several years earlier employed his older brother Wilfred. He was born in Kenora, Ontario.

== Playing career ==
Harris first played senior-level hockey in 1927–28 for the Regina Capitals of the Prairie Hockey League. After one season, Harris transferred to the Seattle Eskimos of the Pacific Coast Hockey League. Harris played two seasons for the Eskimos before being traded to the Boston Bruins of the NHL. However, he did not join Boston right away as Boston loaned him back to Seattle for the rest of the 1929–30 season. The following season, Harris travelled to Boston, and played 32 games for the Bruins and twelve games for the Bruins' affiliate Boston Tigers. That was the only season in the NHL for him as he was not re-signed. He caught on with the Buffalo Majors for one season before returning west to play with the Calgary Tigers of the North West Hockey League. Harris played three seasons for the Tigers.

He died in Winnipeg in 1975 and was interred in Elmwood Cemetery.

== Career statistics ==
=== Regular season and playoffs ===
			Regular season					Playoffs
Season	Team	League	GP	G	A	Pts	PIM	GP	G	A	Pts	PIM
1927–28	Regina Capitals	PHL	23	2	2	4	12	—	—	—	—	—
1928–29	Seattle Eskimos	PCHL	36	8	3	11	138	5	1	0	1	10
1929–30	Seattle Eskimos	PCHL	34	11	3	14	128	—	—	—	—	—
1930–31	Boston Bruins	NHL	32	2	4	6	20	—	—	—	—	—
1930–31	Boston Tigers	Can-Am	12	2	3	5	32	9	1	2	3	30
1931–32	Buffalo Majors	AHA	15	0	4	4	32	—	—	—	—	—
1932–33	Calgary Tigers	WCHL	30	6	6	12	65	6	0	2	2	9
1933–34	Calgary Tigers	NWHL	34	9	10	19	46	5	3	0	3	2
1934–35	Calgary Tigers	NWHL	22	5	5	10	22	—	—	—	—	—
PCHL totals			70	19	6	25	266	5	1	0	1	10
NHL totals			32	2	4	6	20	—	—	—	—	—
