= East Buntyn Historic District =

Residential historic district in Memphis, Tennessee, US

- U.S. National Register of Historic Places
- U.S. Historic district
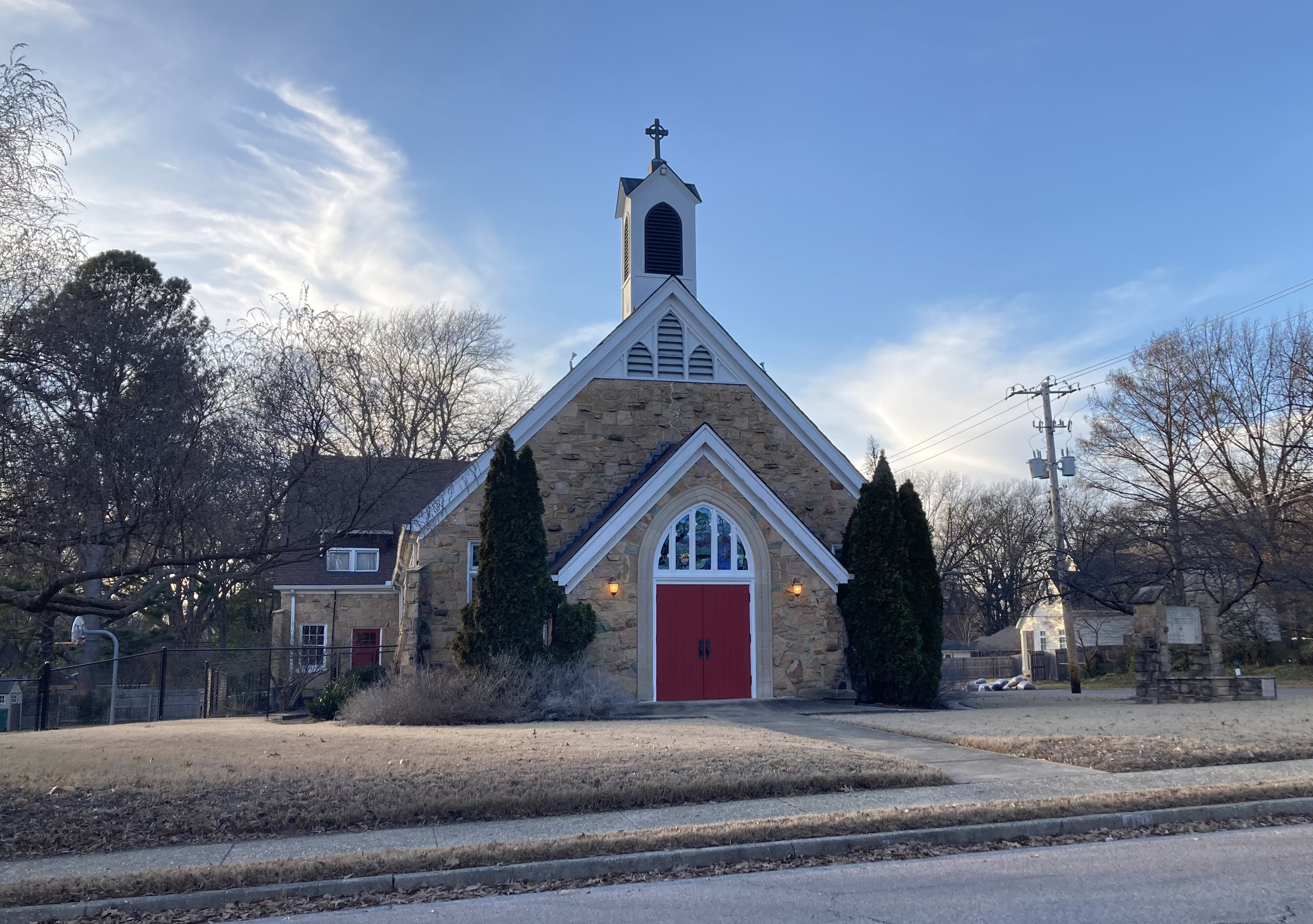
- St. James Church (formerly the East Side Cumberland Presbyterian Church), a contributing property to the historic district

- Location within Tennessee Location within the United States
- Location: Roughly bounded by Central Avenue, Southern Avenue, South Ellsworth Street and South Greer Street
- Coordinates: 35.1194°N 89.9499°W
- Area: 166.5 acres (67.4 ha)
- Architectural style: Bungalow/Craftsman, Colonial Revival, Tudor Revival
- NRHP reference No.: 95001332
- Added to NRHP: November 22, 1995

The East Buntyn Historic District is a historic district comprising the East Buntyn residential neighborhood of Memphis, Tennessee, United States. The East Memphis neighborhood located 6 miles (9.7 km) east of Downtown Memphis consists of 683 buildings, 599 of which contribute to its historic character. Contributing properties include houses, duplexes, a church and other structures. The neighborhood was developed as a suburb between 1925 and 1945 and retains the styles and character of its era of construction, with most buildings representing the Craftsman bungalow, Colonial Revival, and Tudor Revival styles. The neighborhood has been listed on the National Register of Historic Places since 1995.
