= Royal U. Grote Jr. =

American Reformed Episcopalian bishop

The Most Reverend Royal U. Grote Jr.
- Presiding Bishop, Reformed Episcopal Church, and Bishop Ordinary of the Diocese of Mid-America
- Church: Reformed Episcopal Church
- Diocese: Diocese of Mid-America
- In office: 1996–2016
- Predecessor: Franklin Sellers (as bishop ordinary); Leonard W. Riches (as presiding bishop)
- Successor: Ray Sutton
- Previous post: Missionary Bishop of the Special Jurisdiction of North America

Orders
- Ordination: 1976
- Consecration: 6 June 1984

Personal details
- Born: 16 August 1946
- Died: 24 November 2016 (aged 70)
- Spouse: Ellen Grote
- Children: 4 (including Jason)

Royal Upton Grote Jr. (16 August 1946 – 24 November 2016) was an American Anglican bishop. He served as the Presiding Bishop of the Reformed Episcopal Church (REC), from 2014 to 2016, which was a founding member of the Anglican Church in North America in June 2009. He also served as bishop ordinary of the REC Diocese of Mid-America.

Grote spent most of his youth in Hatboro/Horsham, Pennsylvania, where his father was the founding pastor of Horsham Bible Church. He entered the Reformed Episcopal Seminary in Philadelphia in 1972. He was ordained a presbyter in 1976 and then became the rector of St. Philip's Reformed Episcopal Church in Warminster, Pennsylvania, in 1976. Grote was called to be rector of St. Luke's Reformed Episcopal Church in New Providence, New Jersey, in 1978.

In 1984, Grote was elected and consecrated assistant bishop of the Diocese of the Northeast and Mid-Atlantic by Leonard W. Riches, being in office from June 6, 1984, to August 1, 1991. In 1990, with the creation of the Special Jurisdiction of North America by the General Council of the REC, Grote was called to be their missionary bishop, charged with the planting of new parishes in the central and western parts of the United States. He moved to Houston, Texas, in July 1991 to start his ministry. The merging of the Special Jurisdiction of North America with the Synod of Chicago in 1996 gave origin to the new Diocese of Mid-America. Grote was bishop ordinary from that time until his death. The Diocese of Mid-America would later be divided twice, forming the Diocese of Central States and the Diocese of the West.

Having served as lecturer at the Reformed Episcopal Seminary in Philadelphia, Grote also served as the Chancellor of Cranmer Theological House in Houston, Texas, where he was a lecturer in dogmatic theology. He was elected to be vice-president of the General Council of the Reformed Episcopal Church in 1999, 2002, 2005, 2008 and 2011. In June 2014, he was elected Presiding Bishop of the REC. He was also President of the REC Board of Foreign Missions and the President of the Board of Pensions and Relief for the Reformed Episcopal Church. He died unexpectedly in his sleep on 24 November 2016 and was replaced provisionally by Ray Sutton.

Anglican Communion titles
Preceded by Franklin Sellers	REC Bishop of Mid-America; 1996–2016	Succeeded by Ray Sutton
Preceded by Leonard Riches	Presiding Bishop of the Reformed Episcopal Church; 2014–2016	Succeeded by Ray Sutton
