= Charlie Camlin =

American Anglican bishop (born 1964)

The Right Reverend Charles F. Camlin
- Suffragan Bishop of Mid-America
- Church: Anglican Church in North America; Reformed Episcopal Church
- Diocese: Mid-America
- In office: 2024–present
- Other posts: Dean, Cathedral Church of the Holy Communion

Orders
- Ordination: 2003 (diaconate)
- Consecration: March 21, 2024 by Foley Beach

Personal details
- Born: 1964 (age 61–62)
- Spouse: Brett Altman Camlin
- Education: Southeastern Baptist Theological College, Dallas Theological Seminary, Middlesex University

Charles F. Camlin (born 1964) is an American Anglican bishop. He was consecrated in 2024 as bishop suffragan of the Diocese of Mid-America in the Reformed Episcopal Church and the Anglican Church in North America. He is also dean of Cranmer Theological House, the diocesan seminary, and dean of the diocesan cathedral, the Church of the Holy Communion in Dallas.

== Biography ==
Camlin was born in 1964 in Georgetown, South Carolina. He grew up in a Baptist family. Camlin worked as a real estate broker in his 20s and early 30s, when he married the former Brett Altman. In the mid-1990s, after the birth of the first of their three children, he sensed a call to ordained ministry and obtained his B.A. at Southeastern Baptist Theological College and his Th.M. from Dallas Theological Seminary.

After the move to Dallas, Camlin also began teaching in K-12 schools and began to be drawn toward Anglicanism at the Church of the Holy Communion under then-rector Ray Sutton. His Baptist ordination was regularized by Sutton in 2003. Camlin was youth director at Church of the Holy Communion before being called to Holy Trinity Church in Fairfax, Virginia, where he was vicar and then rector from 2005 to 2014. At that time, he returned to Dallas as assistant rector of Holy Communion, being appointed rector and dean in 2017.

Camlin also held academic posts in K-12 schools and Reformed Episcopal Church seminaries. He was assistant professor of New Testament at Reformed Episcopal Seminary, and when he returned to Dallas, he was a lecturer at Cranmer House before his appointment as dean in 2022, the year he completed his Ph.D. in theology at Middlesex University.

In 2023, Sutton called for the election of a second bishop suffragan in the Diocese of Mid-America, and Camlin was elected. His election was granted consent by the Anglican Church in North America college of bishops in January 2024, and Foley Beach and Ray Sutton consecrated him a bishop on March 21, 2024, at the Church of the Holy Communion.
