= Buffalo Majors =

- City: Buffalo, New York
- League: American Hockey Association
- Operated: 1930–1932
- Home arena: Broadway Auditorium (primary); Peace Bridge Arena (final 12 games)
- Owner: Lawrence F. Welch
- Head coach: George Sears

The Buffalo Majors were a professional ice hockey team in the city of Buffalo, New York. The team played two seasons in the American Hockey Association.

The team was organized in 1930 by Lawrence F. Welch, owner of the Buffalo Amusement Company. He put together a team of Canadian hockey players and arranged for an artificial ice rink to be built in the Broadway Auditorium. The original name of the team was Buffalo Buffaloes but was changed before the start of the first season. The team changed its name again, from Americans to Majors, sometime in January 1931. The team's first coach was George Sears, a 25-year veteran of ice hockey. The Majors marketed themselves largely as a rougher, tougher alternative to their ostensibly crosstown rivals, the International Hockey League's Buffalo Bisons, who played across the border at Peace Bridge Arena in Fort Erie, Ontario.

The first season was plagued by problems. Financial backing for the artificial ice plant was withdrawn but Welch found other backers. The first game in Chicago had to be delayed due to immigration problems for some of his players. The team started its season on the road, in a 3–2 loss in Tulsa to the Tulsa Oilers. The team had to vacate the Auditorium for an American Bowling Congress tournament. From the time of their first game at the Auditorium, until their last at the Auditorium, the team went undefeated at home. The team played its final twelve home games in the Bisons' arena, Peace Bridge Arena. Despite the difficulties of their first season, the team nearly qualified for a playoff spot, losing out in the final game of the season.

The second season saw the Majors struggle to escape the basement of the league standings. The team fell behind in payroll and its payments to the league, a likely byproduct of the extremely poor economy of the time. The AHA decided to disband the team on February 2, 1932, citing the financial difficulties of the team and efforts to reduce travel costs. (Not only were the Majors losing money, but the team was also the easternmost team in a league primarily centered in the Great Plains, and having to travel to and from Buffalo added significant expense to all of the teams' budgets.)

== Notable players ==
- Moose Goheen
- Henry Harris
- Eddie Oatman
- Edmond Bouchard
- Fred Lowrey
- Amby Moran
