= Church of the Holy Communion (Dallas) =

Reformed Episcopal Church cathedral in Dallas, Texas, U.S.

Coordinates: 32°59′23″N 96°49′21″W

Cathedral Church of the Holy Communion
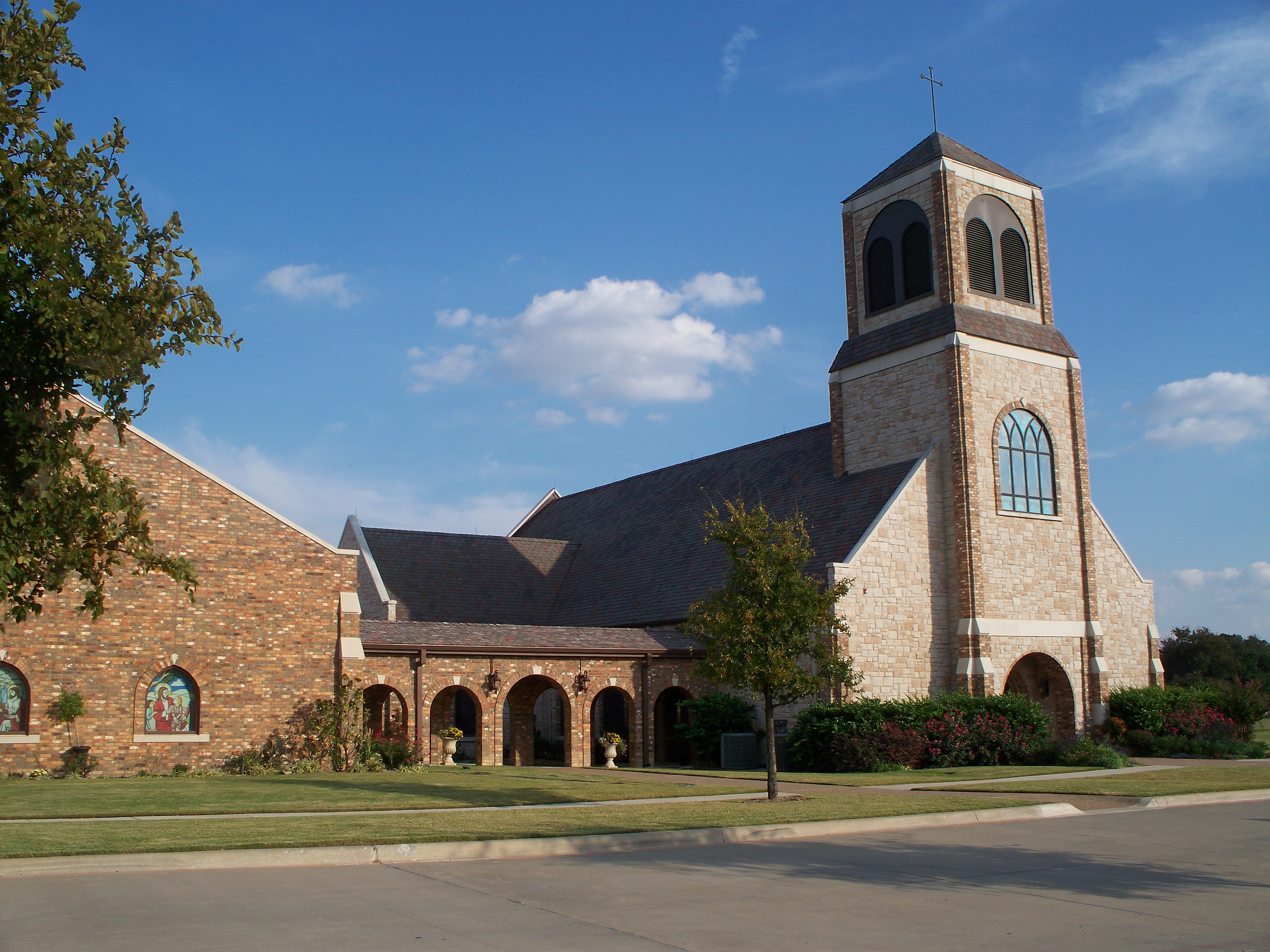
- Location: Dallas, Texas
- Country: United States
- Denomination: Anglican Church in North America
- Website: www.holycommuniondallas.org

History
- Founded: 1963
- Dedicated: 2006

Administration
- Diocese: Mid-America

Clergy
- Bishop: The Most Rev. Ray Sutton
- Dean: The Rt. Rev. Charlie Camlin

The Cathedral Church of the Holy Communion is an Anglican church in Dallas, Texas. It is the cathedral of the Reformed Episcopal Church Diocese of Mid-America, which is led by Holy Communion's former longtime rector, Bishop Ray Sutton. Holy Communion is a traditional Anglican parish using the 1928 Book of Common Prayer in its worship services.

== History ==
The first church on the site of Holy Communion dates to the mid-19th century. The site on Hall's Branch of White Rock Creek was a popular grazing and watering spot on the Shawnee Trail for cattle drivers and migrants. In 1852, William C. McKamy and his family arrived from Tennessee and began accumulating an estate of roughly 3,000 acres on the site. McKamy sold firewood and water to westbound settlers and provided camping space for them in the wagon yard. Eventually, a community of about 80 grew up around the site, and in 1872, a Masonic lodge was built there. The hall was used for services from multiple denominations. A cemetery was established on the site as early as 1862.

The community at Frankford went into decline after the Southern Railway bypassed the village for a stop to the south in present-day Addison. Most of the buildings (including the Masonic lodge) were torn down. In 1899, McKamy built a white wooden church on the site of the lodge. The church held services for circuit riders of multiple denominations, but the primary worshipers in the church were Methodists, but there was no single congregation that occupied the church building. Eventually, the Frankford Cemetery Association took possession of the site, including the cemetery and church.

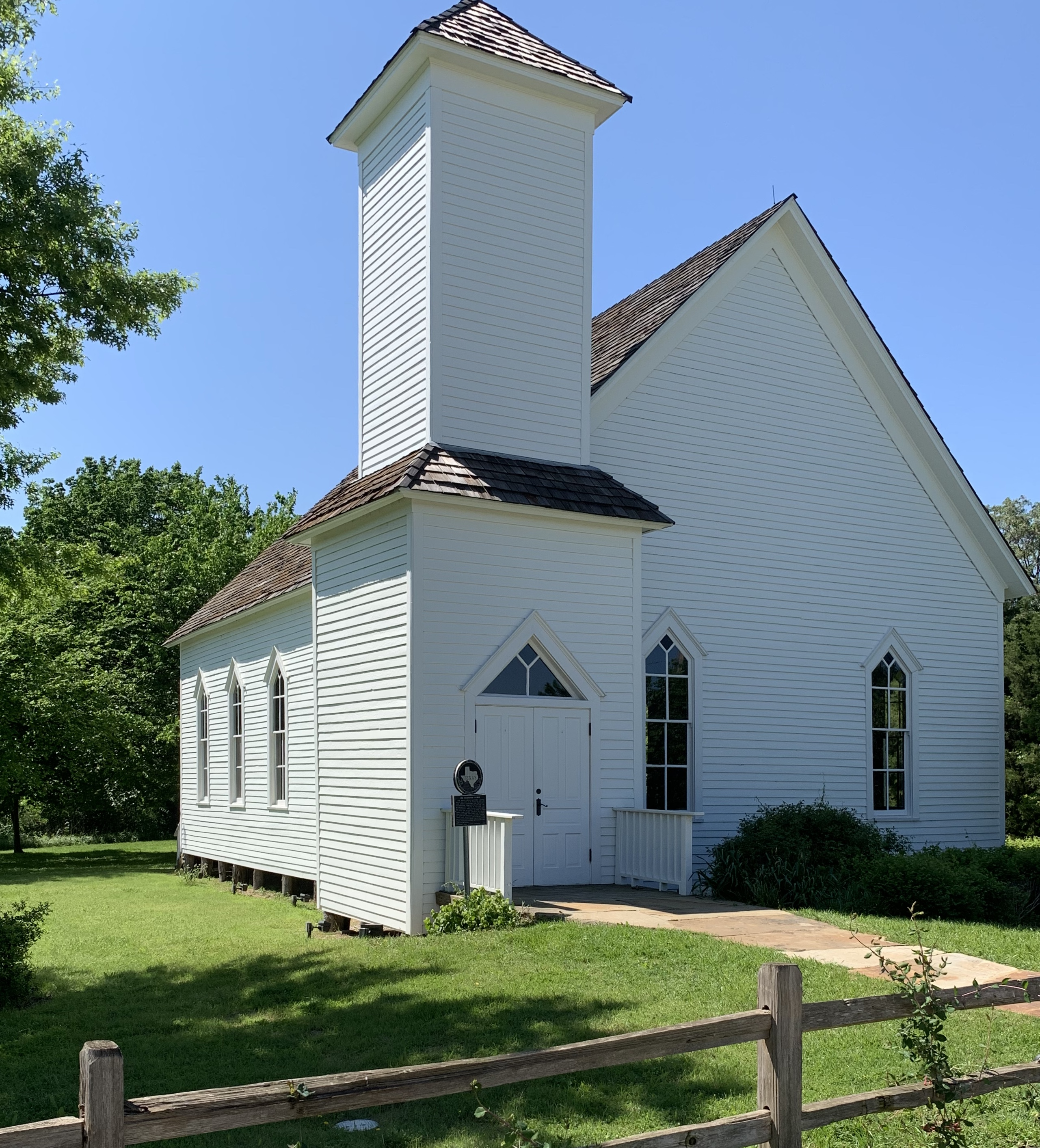
The historic Frankford Church where Holy Communion met for its first several decades

Amid the growth of the North Dallas suburbs, John W. McKamy―great-grandson of William McKamy―and his wife Ann Leftwich McKamy began to hold Episcopal Church services in the old church. The Church of the Holy Communion was founded in 1963 as a mission of the Episcopal Diocese of Dallas. For more than 40 years, Holy Communion held services in the historic Frankford Church.

In 1986, after the use of the 1979 Book of Common Prayer was mandated in Episcopal churches, Holy Communion petitioned to separate from the Diocese of Dallas. The congregation remained independent, using the 1928 BCP, for 16 years. In 2001, the church called Ray Sutton as its rector. Sutton was a bishop suffragan in the Reformed Episcopal Church, which resulted in Holy Communion joining the REC in 2002. In 2006, Holy Communion dedicated its new church building adjacent to the historic Frankford church and cemetery. (The now-vacant Frankford Church is managed by the Frankford Preservation Foundation; both the cemetery and the church are recognized as historic sites by the Texas Historical Commission.) Holy Communion was designated a pro-cathedral of the Diocese of Mid-America in 2012. In 2017, Sutton was succeeded as rector by Charles Camlin; that same year, Sutton was installed as bishop ordinary of the diocese and presiding bishop of the REC.

== Ministries ==
Holy Communion is home to a campus of Cranmer Theological House, one of the recognized seminaries of the REC and the Anglican Church in North America. It also hosts the Anglican Way Institute; past speakers at Institute events have included Gerald Bray, Peter Kreeft, and Eric Metaxas.

In Sutton's capacity as dean for ecumenical relations in the ACNA College of Bishops, Holy Communion hosted ecumenical dialogues between ACNA, Lutheran Church–Missouri Synod, Lutheran Church–Canada, and North American Lutheran Church leaders in 2013; between ACNA and Orthodox Church in America leaders in 2015; and between ACNA and Evangelical Lutheran Church of Latvia leaders in 2022.

The church hosts services in Spanish as well as English.
