= Ray Sutton =

American Anglican bishop

The Most Reverend Ray Sutton
- Presiding Bishop of the Reformed Episcopal Church
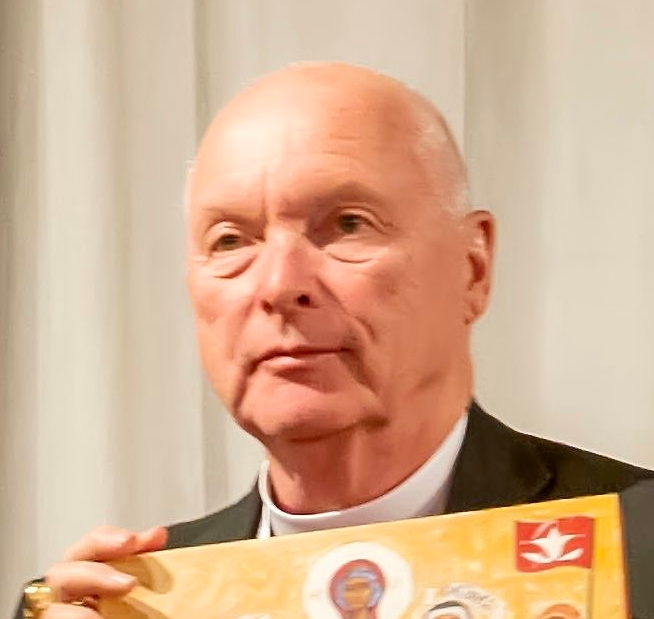
- Sutton presents an icon to the Anglican Deaconesses Association.
- Church: Reformed Episcopal Church, Anglican Church in North America
- Diocese: Mid-America
- In office: 2016–present
- Predecessor: Royal U. Grote Jr.

Orders
- Consecration: July 29, 1999 by Leonard W. Riches

Personal details
- Born: Raymond Ronny Sutton; August 28, 1950 (age 76) Louisville, Kentucky
- Spouse: Susan Jean Schaerdel
- Children: 7
- Education: Southern Methodist University; Dallas Theological Seminary; Wycliffe Hall, Oxford

Ordination history
History
Priestly ordination
- Ordained by: William Jerdan Jr.
Episcopal consecration
- Consecrated by: Leonard W. Riches
Episcopal succession
Bishops consecrated by Ray Sutton as principal consecrator
- John Boonzaaijer: February 15, 2024
- Jason Grote: June 4, 2025

Raymond Ronny Sutton (born 1950) is an American Anglican bishop. He was bishop coadjutor in the Diocese of Mid-America of the Reformed Episcopal Church, a founding member church of the Anglican Church in North America in 2009. He is the former rector of the Church of the Holy Communion in Dallas, Texas, president and Professor of Scripture and Theology at Cranmer Theological House in Houston, Texas, and headmaster of Holy Communion Christian Academy (formerly Bent Tree Episcopal School). Sutton was born in Louisville, Kentucky, and moved to Dallas at age thirteen.

He is currently head of the ecumenical relations committee of the Anglican Church of North America.

He took over the leadership of the Reformed Episcopal Church and the Diocese of Mid-America on November 24, 2016, upon the death of Royal U. Grote Jr., on a provisional level, with his installation taking place on June 15, 2017.

== Personal life ==
Sutton is married to Susan Jean Schaerdel of Dallas. They have seven children and eight grandchildren.

== Education ==
- Bachelor of Fine Arts [B.F.A.] – Southern Methodist University in (1972)
- Master of Theology [Th.M.] – Dallas Theological Seminary (1976)
- Doctor of Philosophy [Ph.D.] – Wycliffe Hall, Oxford University, in association with Coventry University (1998)
- Doctor of Theology (hon.) – Central School of Religion
- Doctor of Divinity (hon.) – Cummins Theological Seminary

== Career ==
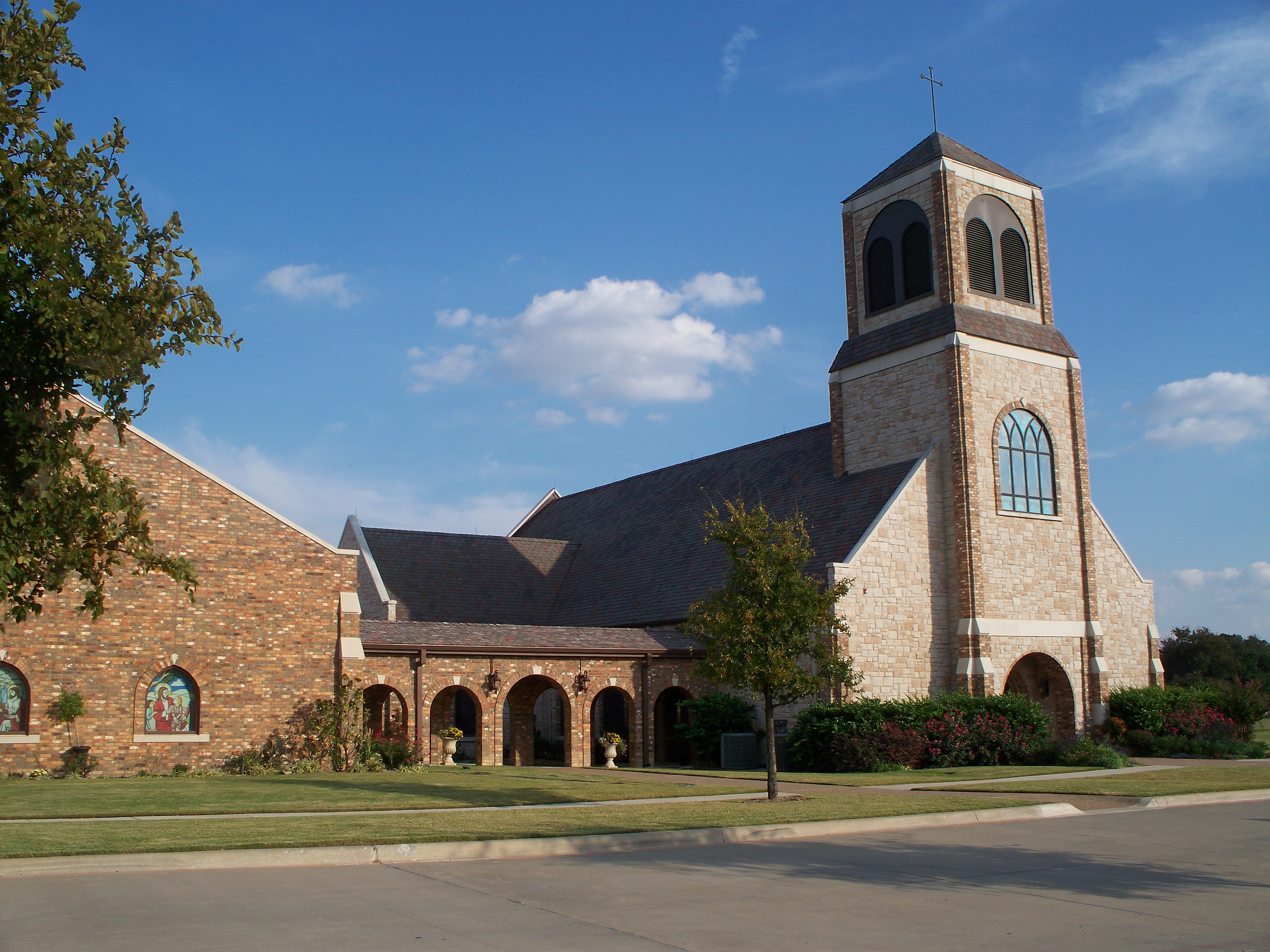
Church of the Holy Communion in North Dallas, Texas

Sutton was in parish ministry from 1976 to 1991. He was a co-pastor with James B. Jordan of Westminster Presbyterian Church in Tyler, Texas, which was a prominent church in the Christian Reconstructionist movement. Other members included Gary North and David Chilton. The church belonged to the Westminster Presbyterian Church of the Association of Reformation Churches in America. North praised Sutton for uncovering that Meredith G. Kline's five-point covenant model applied to the whole Bible, and that it applies to three covenant institutions of family, state and church.

Sutton was the dean and the Associate Professor of New Testament at the Reformed Episcopal Seminary in Philadelphia from 1991 to 1995; and the dean and Professor of Theology at Cranmer Theological House in Shreveport, Louisiana, from 1995 to 2001. Since the synod of the Reformed Episcopal Diocese of Mid America in February 2013, he is again the president of Cranmer Theological House based in the Houston area. Cranmer House also supports a satellite campus in Dallas at Sutton's parish, the Church of the Holy Communion (the diocese's pro-cathedral).

Sutton was ordained a bishop coadjutor of the Reformed Episcopal Church in 1999 and arrived at the Church of the Holy Communion in 2001.

== Works ==
Sutton has authored several theology works:

- The Sacramental Theology of Daniel Waterland (Doctoral Thesis—Coventry University), 1998.
- Signed, Sealed and Delivered: A Study of Holy Baptism, Classical Anglican Press, Houston, TX (2001). ISBN 1-893293-54-8
- Captains and Courts, a Biblical Defense of Episcopal Government.
- Second Chance: Biblical Principals of Divorce and Remarriage, Biblical Hope for the Divorced, Biblical Blueprint Series Vol. #10, The Institute for Christian Economics, (1988).
- That You May Prosper : Dominion by Covenant, The Institute for Christian Economics, (1987).
- Who Owns the Family? : God or the State? Biblical Blueprint Series Vol. #03, Dominion Press, Ft. Worth, TX, (1986).
- Ray Sutton, David Chilton, Gary DeMar, Victoria T. deVries, Michael Gilstrap, Power for Living, Arthur S. DeMoss Foundation, (1983).

=== Articles ===
- Sutton, Ray R. "Covenantal Evil", Covenant Renewal 2 (1988) 4.
- Sutton, Ray R. "Oath and Symbol." Covenant Renewal 3 (1989) 4: 1–4.
- Sutton, Ray R. "Clothing and Calling." in The Reconstruction of the Church. Christianity and Civilization Vol 4. ed. James B. Jordan. Tyler, Texas: Geneva Ministries, (1985).
- Sutton, Ray R. "The Saturday Night Church and the Liturgical Nature of Man." in The Reconstruction of the Church. Christianity and Civilization Vol 4. ed. James B. Jordan. Tyler, Texas: Geneva Ministries, (1985).
- Ray R. Sutton, "The Church as a Shadow Government," Christianity and Civilization III: Tactics of Christian Resistance, Geneva Divinity School, (1983).
- Ray Sutton, "The Baptist Failure", Christianity & Civilization, James B. Jordan, ed., Geneva Divinity School, (1982).

=== Editor ===
- What is Anglicanism?, Latimer Press (2004), by Mark F. M. Clavier, co-edited by Ray Sutton and Peter C. Moore.

Religious titles
Preceded by Don Harvey	Dean of the Anglican Church in North America; 2014–2025	Succeeded by Julian Dobbs
Preceded by Royal U. Grote Jr.	II REC Bishop of Mid-America; 2016–present	Incumbent
Preceded by Royal U. Grote Jr.	Presiding Bishop of the Reformed Episcopal Church; 2017–present	Incumbent
