= Christ Reformed Episcopal Church (Chicago) =

Demolished Reformed Episcopal church in Chicago

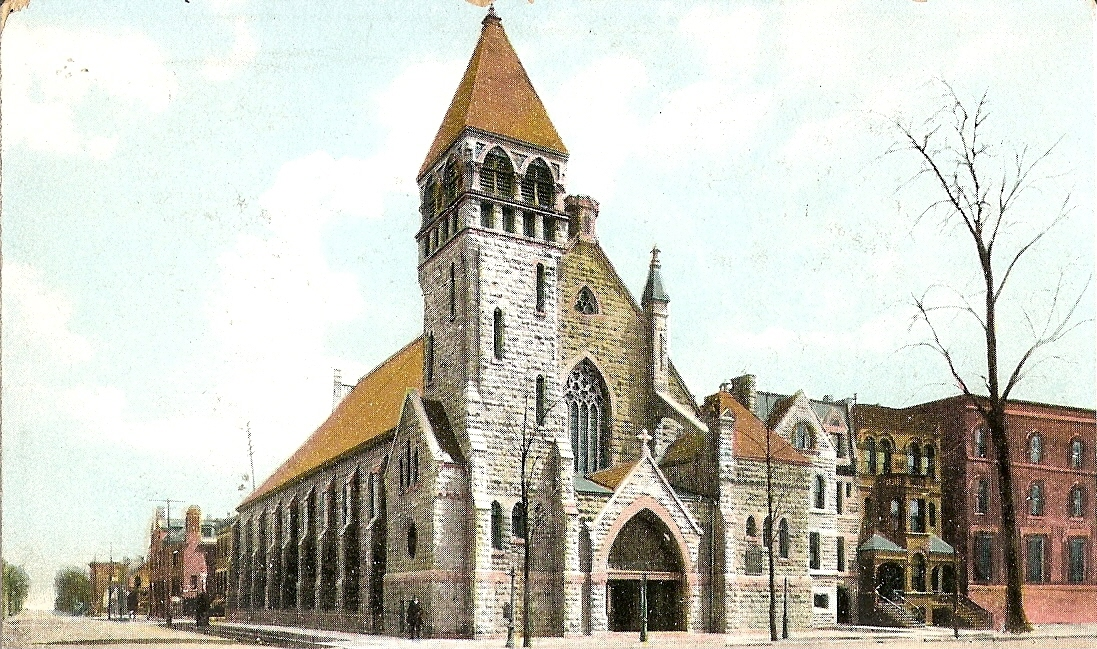
- Christ REC pictured in a postcard c. 1908
- Christ Reformed Episcopal Church
- 41°50′57″N 87°37′24″W
- Country: United States
- Denomination: Reformed Episcopal Church

History
- Founded: 1855
- Dedicated: c. 1860

Architecture
- Style: Victorian Gothic
- Demolished: 1920

Christ Reformed Episcopal Church was a church in Chicago that became a founding member of the Reformed Episcopal Church (REC) in 1873. From around 1860 until its demolition in 1920, the church occupied a Victorian Gothic building on South Michigan Avenue. In addition to its role in REC history, the church was also noted for its Tiffany stained glass windows, many of which survived in different locations.

== History ==
Christ Church was founded as an Episcopal congregation in the then-fast-growing frontier city of Chicago around 1855. According to news sources in the 1890s, its building at South Michigan Avenue and 24th Street was built about 1860. Also in 1860, a newly ordained Episcopal priest named Charles E. Cheney was called as rector.

Cheney was part of the low-church evangelical party in the Episcopal Church and objected to the then-ascendant Anglo-Catholic movement. In a disagreement over baptismal regeneration, Cheney omitted the word "regenerate" as part of the baptismal liturgy and was subjected to an ecclesiastical trial in 1869. Bishop Henry J. Whitehouse deposed him in 1871, and in 1873, Cheney participated in the founding of the Reformed Episcopal Church, which separated from the Episcopal Church. He was elected to serve as a missionary bishop for the northwest area—soon to become the REC Synod of Chicago—and he served in this capacity until his death. George D. Cummins consecrated Cheney a bishop on December 14, 1873, and Christ Church joined the REC early in 1874.

Notable members of Christ Church during Cheney's rectorate included Charles Fargo, younger brother of William Fargo and J. C. Fargo, and George Bangs. Funeral services for Bangs were held at Christ Church in 1877.

Cheney died in 1916 after 56 years in continuous service as rector of Christ Church. In 1920, due to the widening of roads surrounding the building―what the Reformed Episcopal Church called the "imperious demands of the automobile industry which have been made upon Michigan Avenue, once marked by the most beautiful and costly homes of Chicago"―the congregation was forced by "stern necessity" to sell the building. Members of Christ Church joined other REC churches across Chicago.

== Tiffany windows ==
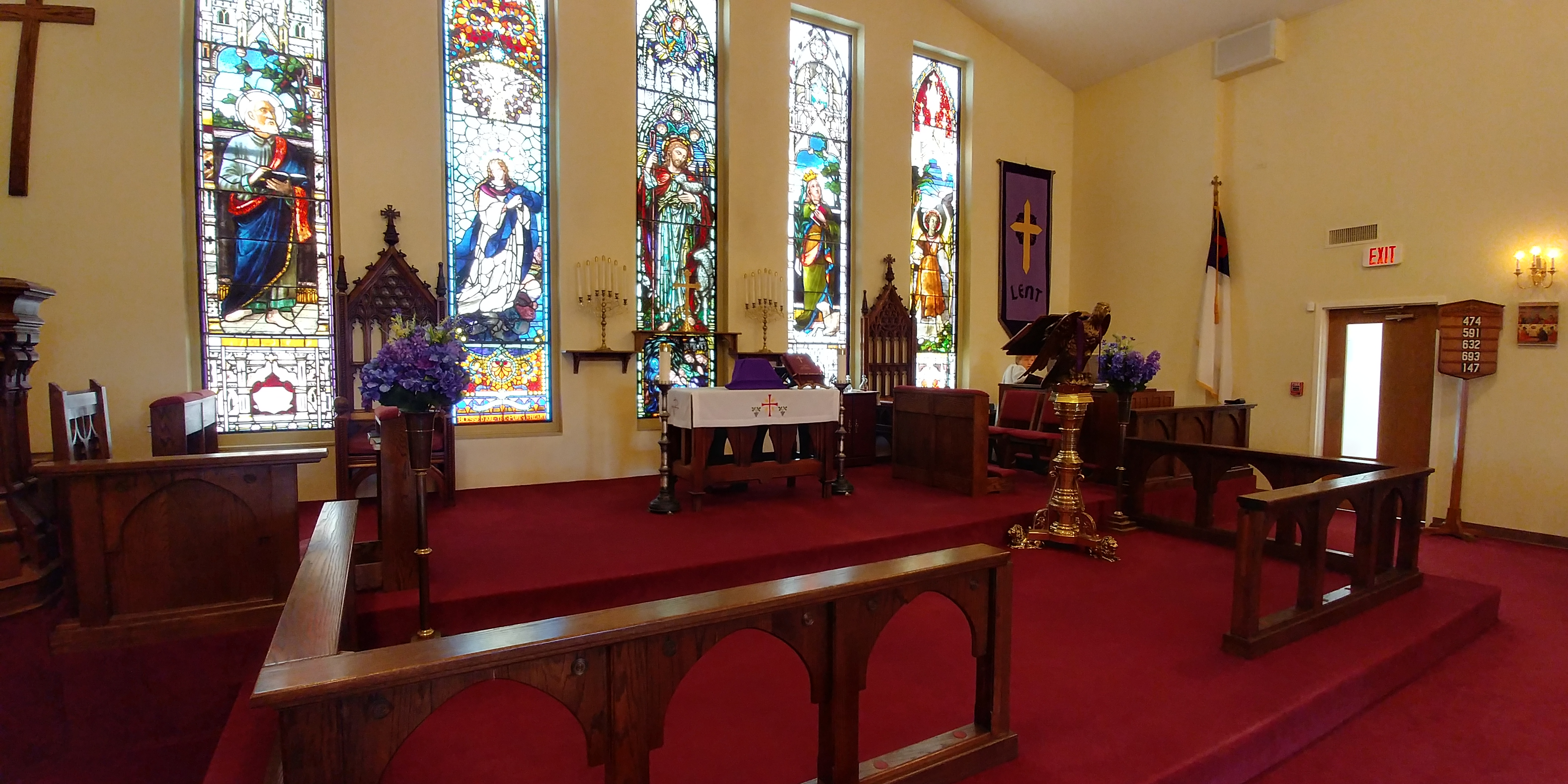
Christ REC's Tiffany windows in the chancel of St. Andrew's Anglican Church

Christ Church included six memorial windows designed in the 1890s by Louis Comfort Tiffany as well as other ornamental windows. After Christ REC was demolished, its windows featuring the Virgin Mary, St. Luke, St. Agnes and an angel announcing the Resurrection were given to Trinity Reformed Episcopal Church at 70th and South Yale in Chicago. These windows moved with this congregation two more times and are now placed in the chancel of its successor, St. Andrew's Anglican Church, a Reformed Episcopal congregation in Tinley Park, Illinois. An additional ornamental window was moved to Tinley Park but not installed and was donated to St. Matthias Anglican Church, then the cathedral of the REC Diocese of Mid-America, in 2006.

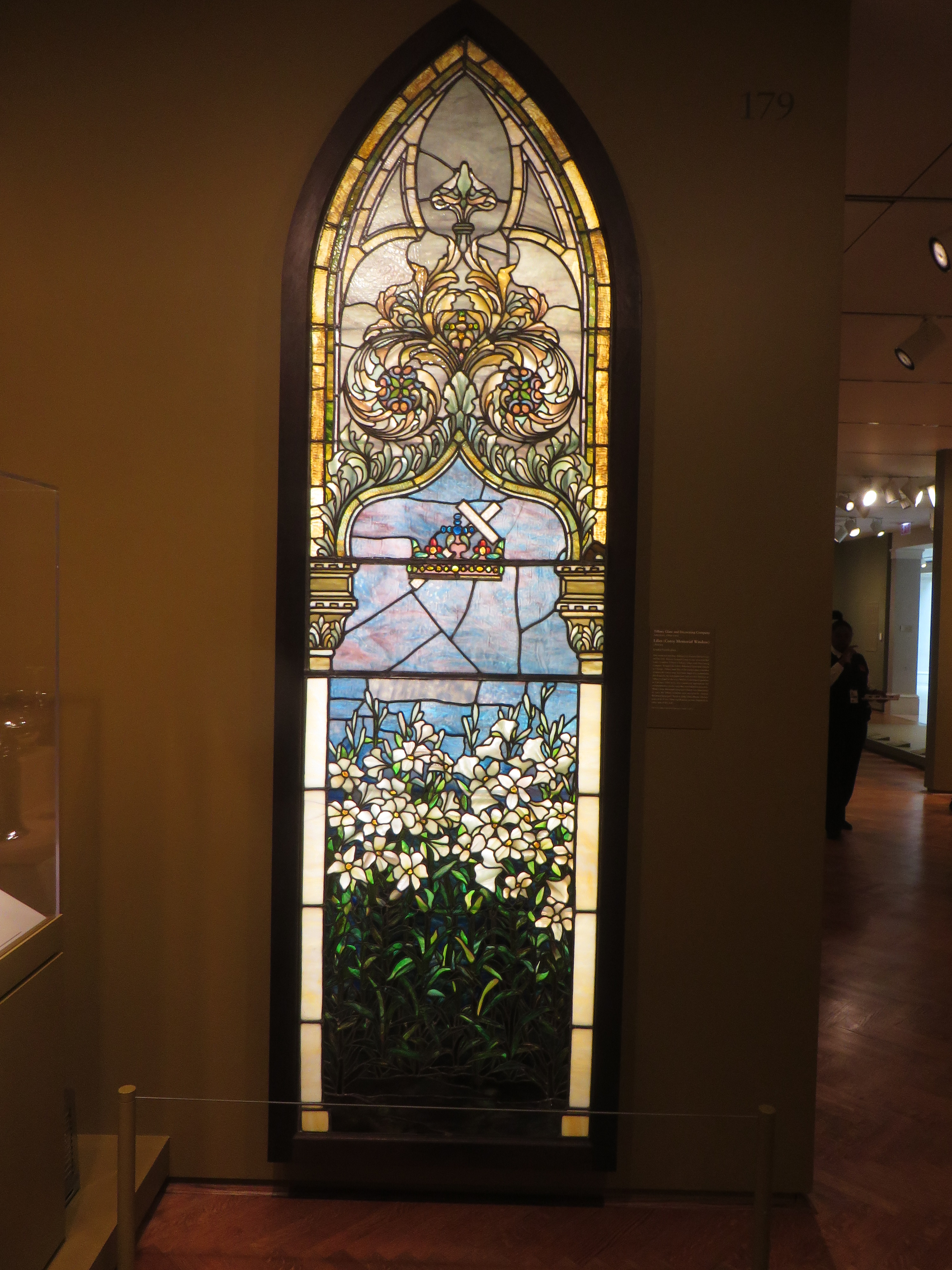
The Corey Memorial Window on display in the Art Institute of Chicago.

One window dedicated to Francis Edwin Corey and his wife, Vernera Leonard Corey, was donated to the Art Institute of Chicago and is on display in its permanent exhibition "Arts of the Americas." The Corey window features lilies as a symbol of the resurrection.
