= Diocese of Mid-America =

Reformed Episcopal church in the United States

REC Diocese of Mid-America

Location
- Ecclesiastical province: Anglican Church in North America

Statistics
- Parishes: 42 (2025)
- Members: 2,814 (2025)

Information
- Rite: Anglican
- Cathedral: Church of the Holy Communion, Dallas, Texas

Current leadership
- Bishop ordinary: Ray Sutton
- Suffragans: Walter Banek, Charlie Camlin

Website
- recdma.org

The REC Diocese of Mid-America, with the Convocation of the West and Western Canada, is a Reformed Episcopal Church and an Anglican Church in North America diocese, since its foundation in 2009. It has 34 congregations, 32 in 12 American states, which are Arkansas, California, Colorado, Illinois, Louisiana, Michigan, Missouri, Mississippi, North Dakota, Nebraska, Oklahoma, Texas and Wisconsin, and 2 congregations in the Canadian province of British Columbia. Its headquarters are located in Dallas, Texas. The Bishop Ordinary was the late Royal U. Grote, Jr., replaced upon his death by the Bishop Coadjutor, Ray R. Sutton.

== History ==
The origin of the Diocese of Mid-America goes back to 1990, when the Reformed Episcopal Church at its General Council decided to create the Special Jurisdiction of North America (SJNA) to cover parishes located west of the Mississippi River. The original territory covered 27 states. Their first Missionary Bishop elected was Royal U. Grote Jr, who moved to Houston, Texas, in July 1991. In 1996, the merger of the Special Jurisdiction of North America with the Synod of Chicago, the oldest of the Reformed Episcopal Church, led to the creation of the Diocese of Mid-America. A portion of the Diocese of Mid-America was combined with portions of the Diocese of the Northeast and Mid-Atlantic and the Diocese of the Southeast to form the Missionary Diocese of the Central States. Another portion of the Diocese of Mid-America was also split off to help form the Diocese of the West.

The Reformed Episcopal Church took part in the Anglican realignment movement that led to the birth of the Anglican Church of North America, of which it was a founding member. The then six jurisdictions, including the Diocese of Mid-America, were in their original founding dioceses.

On 2 December 2012, the Church of the Holy Communion, in Dallas, was declared a Pro-Cathedral by Royal U. Grote, Jr.

The Diocese of Western Canada and Alaska, created in 1996, had two parishes in British Columbia, led by the Rt. Rev. Charles Dorrington, and also included the Missionary District of Cuba. Due to its small size, the diocese was extinct and incorporated in the Diocese of Mid-America, of which is now a part as the Convocation of the West and Western Canada, with Charles Dorrington as Assisting Bishop for Canada and Cuba.

== List of bishops ordinary ==
Bishops from 1873 to 1995 were bishops of the Chicago synod; bishops from 1996 to the present were bishops of the Diocese of Mid-America.

1. Charles E. Cheney (1875–1916)
2. Samuel Fallows (1916–1922)
  Willard Brewing (acting bishop in charge under the REC presiding bishop, 1922–1929)
  Robert Livingston Rudolph (as REC presiding bishop, 1922–1930)
  Robert Westly Peach (as REC presiding bishop, 1930–1931)
3. Frank V. C. Cloak (1931–1953)
  Joseph E. Kearny (as REC presiding bishop, 1953–1957)
  Howard D. Higgins (as REC presiding bishop, 1957–1974)
4. Franklin Sellers (1974–1996)
5. Royal U. Grote, Jr. (1996–2016; ordinary of the Special Jurisdiction of North America, 1990–1996)
6. Ray Sutton (2016–present)

== Parishes ==
In 2025, the Diocese of Mid-America had 2,814 members (up 8% from 2022) with an average Sunday attendance of 2,041 (up 22% from 2022) in 42 congregations (one more than 2022). Notable parishes in the diocese include:

Church	Image	City	Year founded	Year completed	Notes
Mariners' Church		Detroit, Michigan	1842	1849	Listed on the National Register of Historic Places
Living Word Reformed Episcopal Church		Courtenay, British Columbia	1877	2001	Canadian Register of Historic Places
Church of the Holy Communion		Dallas, Texas	1963	2006	Diocesan cathedral

Notable defunct parishes associated with the Synod of Chicago included Christ Reformed Episcopal Church and St. Paul's Reformed Episcopal Church.

== Cranmer Theological House ==
Cranmer Theological House
- Type: Seminary
- Established: 1994
- Parent institution: Diocese of Mid-America
- Religious affiliation: Reformed Episcopal Church
- Chancellor: Ray Sutton
- President and dean: Charlie Camlin
- Location: Dallas, Texas; 32.9897°N 96.8225°W
- Website: cranmerhouse.org

Cranmer Theological House is the diocesan seminary and one of three seminaries of the Reformed Episcopal Church. As of 2025, the seminary had pursued accreditation with the Association of Theological Schools but remained unaccredited. According to The Living Church, Cranmer House played an important role in the early Anglican realignment movement by bringing together evangelical Episcopalians and Anglo-Catholics and laying the groundwork for cross-jurisdictional transfers and relicensing of clergy outside of Episcopal Church structures.

=== History ===
Cranmer House was founded in Shreveport, Louisiana, in 1994. It initially operated in a chapel built by pharmaceutical company owner and Episcopal priest M. Allen Dickson adjacent to his company's warehouse. Students would attend classes in the mornings, then work afternoons and evenings at the warehouse. REC priest Louis Tarsitano was the first dean but left the post after a year; Ray Sutton, the former dean of Reformed Episcopal Seminary in Philadelphia, became dean and Cranmer House graduated its first class in 1996.

During its early years, the seminary focused on recruiting theologically conservative Episcopalians. The seminary hosted an ordination in 1999 in which Bishop Terence Kelshaw of the Episcopal Diocese of the Rio Grande ordained two deacons on behalf of a bishop in the Church of Uganda for service in the El Paso-based American diocese. Bishop John-David Schofield of the Episcopal Diocese of San Joaquin called Cranmer House "one of only three" acceptable seminaries for his ordinands.

The seminary moved from Shreveport to the Houston area in 2001, with programs offered in Dallas and other locations. As of 2025, it was headquartered at Sutton's Church of the Holy Communion in Dallas.

=== Programs ===
Cranmer House provides in-person programs at its Dallas campus and an Atlanta-area extension site as well as online education and independent study. Degree programs include Master of Divinity, Master of Theology, Master of Theological Studies, Master of Arts in religion and deaconess studies, as well as certificate programs.

Cranmer House publishes the open-access, peer-reviewed, biennial Cranmer Theological Journal, edited by Charlie Camlin and Charles Erlandson.
