= Chalcedon Foundation =

American Christian Reconstructionist organization

- Founded: 1965
- Founder: Rousas John Rushdoony
- Type: Nonprofit 501(c)(3)
- Tax ID no.: 95-6121940 (EIN)
- Location: Vallecito, California
- Members: 3
- Owner: Chalcedon, Inc.
- Key people: Mark R. Rushdoony, President; Martin G. Selbrede, Vice President
- Revenue: $961,294 (2010)
- Employees: 10
- Volunteers: 10
- Website: chalcedon.edu

The Chalcedon Foundation is an American Christian Reconstructionist organization, founded by Rousas John Rushdoony in 1965. Named for the Council of Chalcedon, it has also included theologians such as Gary North, who later founded his own organization, the Institute for Christian Economics.

The Chalcedon Foundation provides educational material, in the form of books, newsletter reports and various electronic media, toward advancing the theological teachings of Rushdoony's Christian Reconstructionism movement. It is notable for its role in the influence of Christianity on politics in the U.S. and has been described as "a think tank of the Religious Right." Rushdoony's son Mark now heads the foundation.

The Chalcedon Foundation has been listed as an anti-gay hate group by the Southern Poverty Law Center.

== History ==
The Chalcedon Foundation, which is named after a 451 A.D. council that proclaimed the state's subservience to God, was officially founded by Rousas John Rushdoony in summer 1965. In 1971, Gary North was hired part-time, and two years later North was hired full-time while Greg Bahnsen was also hired. Rushdoony founded Ross House Books in 1976, the same year in which North and Bahnsen left the Foundation to pursue careers elsewhere. In 1977, the Foundation's first office building was built. A decade later, the organization's Newsletter became a magazine, the Chalcedon Report.

In the 1970s multimillionaire Howard Ahmanson became a Calvinist and joined Rushdoony's Christian Reconstructionist movement. Ahmanson served as a board member of Rushdoony's Chalcedon Foundation for approximately 15 years before resigning in 1996. Ahmanson said he had left the Chalcedon board and "does not embrace all of Rushdoony's teachings." Time magazine covered the Ahmansons in their 2005 profiles of the 25 Most Influential Evangelicals in America, classifying them as "the financiers." Former American oil billionaire Nelson Bunker Hunt also made heavy contributions to the Chalcedon Foundation.

Key members of the Chalcedon Foundation over the years have included Gary North, Greg Bahnsen, David Chilton, Gary DeMar, Kenneth Gentry, and Andrew Sandlin. North has defined his politics as Neo-Puritanism.

Rushdoony died on February 8, 2001, and was succeeded by his son Mark Rushdoony, who continues to run the organization. In 2004, Ross House Books merged with Chalcedon, and in 2005, the Chalcedon Report was renamed Faith for All of Life.

In 2005, the Chalcedon Foundation was designated an anti-gay hate group by the Southern Poverty Law Center (SPLC). The Chalcedon Foundation promotes Christian Reconstruction and calls for the "imposition of Old Testament law on America and the world." According to the SPLC, this "embraces the most draconian of religious views", being "opposed to modern notions of equality, democracy or tolerance." The SPLC also stated that Rushdoony supported the death penalty for homosexuals, opposed interracial marriage, denied the Holocaust, and included "incorrigible children" as a group of people deserving of the death penalty.

== Beliefs ==
The Chalcedon Foundation describes itself as a Christian educational organization oriented toward promoting Christian reconstruction, emphasizing the Cultural or Dominion Mandate. The Foundation's founder, Rousas John Rushdoony, who is known as “father of Christian Reconstruction” theology, advocated the imposition of Old Testament laws. Newsweek magazine described the Chalcedon Foundation as "a think tank of the Religious Right, including the Moral Majority." Rushdoony himself claimed that his movement had 20 million followers, although not all of them are members of an organization.

Chalcedon Foundation roots in the late 1960s evolved from Rushdoony's career as an Orthodox Presbyterian pastor. Rushdoony, and a handful of Ph.D.s and ex-seminarians wrote books and articles that were not especially popular at the time. Forty years later, however, secular journalists characterize Rushdoony's movement as "the spark plug behind much of the battle over religion in politics today". Rushdoony's work via the Chalcedon Foundation challenged conservative Christians to "take the whole Bible seriously—including inconvenient verses in the Old Testament that most Christians, even biblical literalists, politely ignore."

=== Reconstructionism ===
The Chalcedon Foundation advocates the Christian Reconstructionism movement which "believes Christians must take control of society for 1,000 years before the Second Coming of Christ can be achieved." Rushdoony believed the Bible should be adopted as law, including Scriptures advocating the death penalty for homosexuality, striking or cursing a parent, adultery, and lying. Rushdoony developed and articulated Christian Reconstructionism in his book The Institutes of Biblical Law (1973), which is promoted by the Chalcedon Foundation. The book is a commentary on the Ten Commandments, and provides an outline of a program for establishing a Christian theocracy.

According to American journalist Frederick Clarkson, reconstructionism has played an important role in shaping the contemporary Christian Right citing that Reconstructionists who have already moved into positions of significant power and influence are two directors of Chalcedon Foundation, philanthropist Howard Ahmanson and political consultant Wayne C. Johnson, epitomizing the political strategy of the new Christian Right.

=== Dominionism ===
Dominionism or Dominion Theology is a grouping of theological systems with the common belief that the law of God, as codified in the Bible, should exclusively govern society, to the exclusion of secular law, a view also known as theonomy. Reconstructionists themselves use the word dominionism to refer to their belief that Christians alone should control civil government, conducting it according to Biblical law.

The central biblical text for Dominionists is Genesis 1:26–28, in which God declares that man shall have dominion over all the earth. This is seen as a mandate for believers to create both a Christian government and a Christian culture. It has been primarily associated with Rushdoony's Reconstructionism movement, as espoused by the Chalcedon Foundation. Rushdoony himself supported the John Birch Society, while North wrote the epilogue to a conspiracist text by the John Birch Society author, Larry Abraham. North went as far as declaring that the enemies of the United States were “a conspiracy of super-rich and super-powerful insiders.”

=== Homeschooling ===
The Chalcedon Foundation advocates homeschooling, believing "that the right place for a child's education is his home, and the right teachers are his parents".

Rushdoony, a staunch advocate of homeschooling, viewed it as a way to combat the intentionally secular nature of the U.S. public school system. He vigorously attacked progressive school reformers such as Horace Mann and John Dewey and argued for the dismantling of the state's influence in education in three works: Intellectual Schizophrenia (a general and concise study of education), The Messianic Character of American Education (a history and castigation of public education in the U.S.), and The Philosophy of the Christian Curriculum (a parent-oriented pedagogical statement), each of which are still promoted by the Chalcedon Foundation.

In Harsh Truth About Public Schools published by the Chalcedon Foundation, writer and attorney Bruce N. Shortt, who homeschooled his own children, writes of the "dishonorable conduct, degenerating academic standards, and defensive bureaucracy that are jeopardizing America's future, courtesy of teacher unions' self-interest and increasingly derelict parents".

== See also ==
- American Vision – related organization
- Christian fundamentalism
- Christian libertarianism
- List of organizations designated by the Southern Poverty Law Center as anti-gay hate groups
- Radical right (United States)
- Separation of church and state
- TheocracyWatch
