= David Chilton =

American pastor and author (1951–1997)

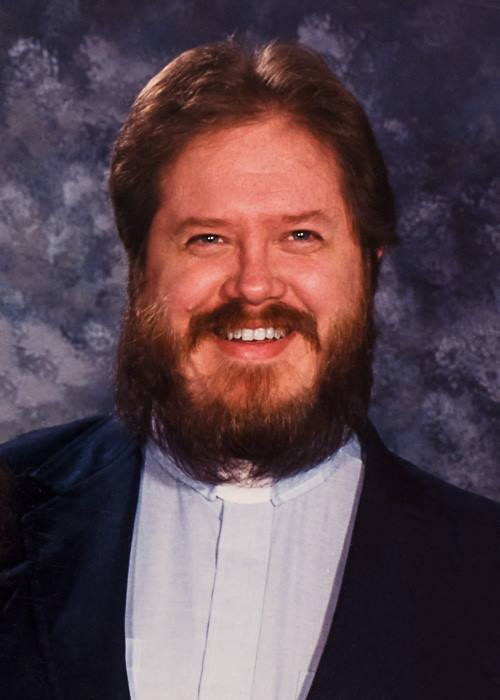
- Chilton, c. 1988
- Born: David Harold Chilton; 1951; Philadelphia, Pennsylvania, U.S.
- Died: 1997 (aged 45–46); United States
- Occupations: Pastor; speaker; author

David Harold Chilton (1951–1997) was an American pastor, Reconstructionist, speaker and author of several books on economics, eschatology and Christian Worldview from Placerville, California. He contributed three books on eschatology: Paradise Restored (1985), The Days of Vengeance (1987), and The Great Tribulation (1987).

His book Productive Christians in an Age of Guilt-Manipulators: A Biblical Response to Ronald J. Sider (1981) was a response to Ronald J. Sider's best-selling book, Rich Christians in an Age of Hunger: A Biblical Study (1977), which promoted various programs of wealth redistribution by the government. Chilton argued that the Bible either does not authorize such programs or explicitly teaches against them.

His book Power in the Blood: A Christian Response to AIDS (1987) was primarily dealing with the Church's relationship with the world.

Julie Ingersoll notes that Chilton was the Reconstructionist specialist on postmillennialism, and that while Rousas Rushdoony was the "architect of the theological and philosophical system", Chilton was the "general contractor in charge of developing and popularizing postmillennialism."

== Early years ==
David Chilton was born in Philadelphia, Pennsylvania in 1951. At the age of one, he moved with his Christian missionary parents to the Philippines. At the age of 8, the family returned to the United States where his father became a pastor in Southern California. Growing up in California in the 1970s youth movement and hippie culture, he experienced a conversion to Christianity while listening to a missionary speak at his father's church. He began reading the Bible and teaching Bible studies. The young Chilton consequently became deeply involved in the nascent Jesus People movement and started a singing group with his sister Jayn and some friends called The Children of Light. He frequently spoke, performed music, and taught Bible studies at Christian coffeehouses in Los Angeles, California region. He was ordained in the Jesus People Movement by Pat Boone.

Chilton came to prominence as a writer for the Chalcedon Report edited by R.J. Rushdoony after a Christian friend recommended one of Rushdoony's books. At the same time, Chilton discovered the writings of the Puritans. and was exposed for the first time to Reformed theology as a result of reading these books, and to the doctrines of predestination, election, and perseverance of the saints. After meeting Rushdoony, Chilton was asked to write a monthly column for Chalcedon Report while alternating speaking for Dr. Rushdoony at his church in Hollywood (which was affiliated with the Orthodox Presbyterian Church) while pastoring a church in Anaheim, California. At this time Chilton was also influenced by fellow Christian Reconstructionist Greg Bahnsen and James B. Jordan. He married his wife, Darlene, and had 3 children, Nathan, Jacob, and Abigail.

In 1981, after several years of pastoring in Anaheim, Chilton wrote his first book, Productive Christians in an Age of Guilt-Manipulators: A Biblical Response to Ronald J. Sider over the course of a month with a pencil and paper at a coffeehouse. Not long after the completion of the book, he moved to Placerville, CA to pastor a church for a year, during which he wrote a newsletter for Christian teachers and homeschoolers called The Biblical Educator. Chilton also used his influence to help launch World Magazine with Joel Belz and wrote a monthly column for the publication for years, which was very popular.

Chilton accepted a job offer from prominent Reconstructionist (and Rushdoony son-in-law) Gary North as a research assistant at The Institute for Christian Economics in Tyler, Texas. It was during his three-year stay in Texas that North commissioned Chilton to write his two books for North's imprint Dominion Press: Paradise Restored and Days of Vengeance.

== Later life and death ==
In 1986, Chilton accepted an offer to return to Placerville to pastor the church there. He continued to work in pastoral ministry, speak at conferences, write a weekly column for The Sacramento Union newspaper, was counsel for The Field stead Co. at an economic conference in Switzerland and wrote his last two books, The Great Tribulation and Power in the Blood.

Whitefield Theological Seminary awarded him with 2 degrees: The Master of Divinity in the field of Pastoral Theology in 1990 and the degree of Doctor of Philosophy in the field of Christian Thought in 1992, primarily for his work on Days of Vengeance.

In 1994, Chilton suffered a major heart attack and went into a six-week coma. He slowly began to recover, though he had difficulty speaking. During this time, he wrote a monthly column on the family for Ligonier Ministries. He took his second speaking trip to Australia for a month of engagements and also spoke at a church in the Bahamas. He also became a proponent of the Christian eschatological view known as full preterism.

In 1997, Chilton suffered his second heart attack and died at the age of 45 years.

== Books ==
- Chilton, David. 1982, 1986. Productive Christians In An Age Of Guilt Manipulators. Tyler, TX: The Institute for Christian Economics. ISBN 0-930464-38-9.
- Chilton, David. 1985, 1994. Paradise Restored: A Biblical Theology of Dominion. Ft. Worth, TX: Dominion Press. ISBN 0-930462-52-1.
- Chilton, David. 1987, 1990. Days of Vengeance: An Exposition of the Book of Revelation. Ft. Worth, TX: Dominion Press. ISBN 0-930462-09-2.
- Chilton, David. 1987. The Great Tribulation. Ft. Worth, TX: Dominion Press. ISBN 0-930462-55-6.
- Chilton, David. 1987. Power in the Blood. Brentwood, TN: Wolgemuth & Hyatt Publishers, Inc. ISBN 0-943497-22-1
