= Power for Living =

Christian evangelistic book

Power for Living is a Christian evangelistic book distributed free of charge by the Arthur S. DeMoss Foundation in various countries around the world. It was heavily advertised in the US and UK in the mid-1990s as a seemingly secular self-help book.

== Overview ==
Power for Living was originally commissioned by the Arthur S. DeMoss Foundation to celebrate "The Year of the Bible". The first printing was produced by American Vision, Atlanta, Georgia in October 1983 under copyright to the Arthur S. DeMoss Foundation. The writers were the noted Christian authors David Chilton, Gary DeMar, Victoria T. deVries, Michael Gilstrap and Ray Sutton. This version was revised in November 1983 by non-denominational pastor and writer Jamie Buckingham. Both versions of Power for Living contain testimonials from celebrities who became Christians and other content aimed at arguing for the Christian faith.

The revised edition was released because the DeMoss Foundation wanted the book to be less about practical issues of Christian living and to focus more on a Christian evangelistic message. As such, the original edition contained chapters on "God's Perspective" detailing the reformed "Biblical world and life view". The revised edition was decidedly more Arminian in its theology, omitting much of the text coming from a reformed Christian perspective.

The Arthur S. DeMoss Foundation is an American evangelical foundation. Power for Living is credited for having introduced thousands of so-called "seekers" to Christ, with the added aim of having them then begin attending a local Christian church of their choice to further their relationship with Jesus.

=== Arthur S. DeMoss Foundation ===
The Foundation has used its abundant financial resources to promote Power for Living in the United States, Germany, Mexico (Fuerza para Vivir) and, most recently, Japan.

In Japan, television advertisements related to religion are generally considered to be taboo, although Buddhist temples, Shintō shrines, Souka Gakkai, etc., have all produced advertisements for television. The Foundation's advertisements were declared "religious propaganda" by Germany's Federal Broadcasting Council in January, 2002, and as such their broadcast is prohibited in Germany.

=== David Chilton ===
David Chilton (1951–1997) was a pastor, Christian Reconstructionist, and author of several books on eschatology and preterism. He contributed three books on eschatology: Paradise Restored (1985), Days of Vengeance (1987), and The Great Tribulation (1987).

=== Gary DeMar ===
Gary DeMar is an American writer, lecturer and the president of American Vision, an American Christian nonprofit organization. The think-tank has a vision of "an America that recognizes the sovereignty of God over all of life and where Christians are engaged in every facet of society."

=== Jamie Buckingham ===
Jamie Buckingham (1932–1992) was the founder of the Tabernacle Church in Melbourne, Florida. He was the author of Run, Baby, Run (with Nickey Cruz), Shout it From the Housetops (with Pat Robertson), Ben Israel (with Arthur Katz) and 34 other books. Buckingham was editor for Charisma Magazine until his death in 1992. More about Jamie can be found at JamieBuckinghamMinistries.com.

== Controversies ==
=== In Japan ===
Advertisements for a free copy of the book have appeared in Japan on TV Asahi, TV Tokyo, Tokyo Broadcasting System and Nippon Television, but Fuji Television refused to broadcast the ads because of the controversy surrounding them. The advertisements have generated suspicion about the Foundation's origins, activities and purposes, perhaps by the Foundation's failure to declare them to the public precisely.

=== In Germany ===
In Germany, TV advertisings for the book were banned because they were considered as "advertising a worldview or religion", which is forbidden by § 7 section 8 of the German state treaty on broadcasting (Rundfunkstaatsvertrag) and European laws on media. For its posters, newspaper adverts and leaflets, however, there was no such problem.

== History ==
- 1955 - The National Liberty Foundation is established by Arthur S. DeMoss.
- 1979 - DeMoss dies at age 53.
- His wife, Nancy S. DeMoss, inherits 200 million dollars and changes the Foundation's name to the Arthur S. DeMoss Foundation.
- 1983 - Power for living first distributed in the United States.
- 1999 - Television advertisements for the book are aired in the United States.
- 2001 - Distribution begins in Germany.
- 2004 - Distribution begins in Thailand.
- 2007 - Distribution begins in Japan.

== Celebrity endorsements ==
Japanese

- Saki Kubota, singer
- VERBAL, member of the pop group M-Flo
- Chu Kosaka, rock singer

American

- Michelle Akers (women's soccer player)
- Trey Hillman, manager of the Kansas City Royals
- Bernhard Langer (professional golfer)
- Janet Lynn, former figure skater
- Jennifer O'Neill (actress)
- Andy Pettitte (pitcher for the New York Yankees)
- Reggie White (former NFL player and pastor)
- Heather Whitestone (1994 Miss America winner)

German

- Bernhard Langer (golf player)

All are known evangelical Christians.

== See also ==
- Status of religious freedom in Germany
