= David Bahnsen =

American portfolio manager and economist

David Lyle Bahnsen
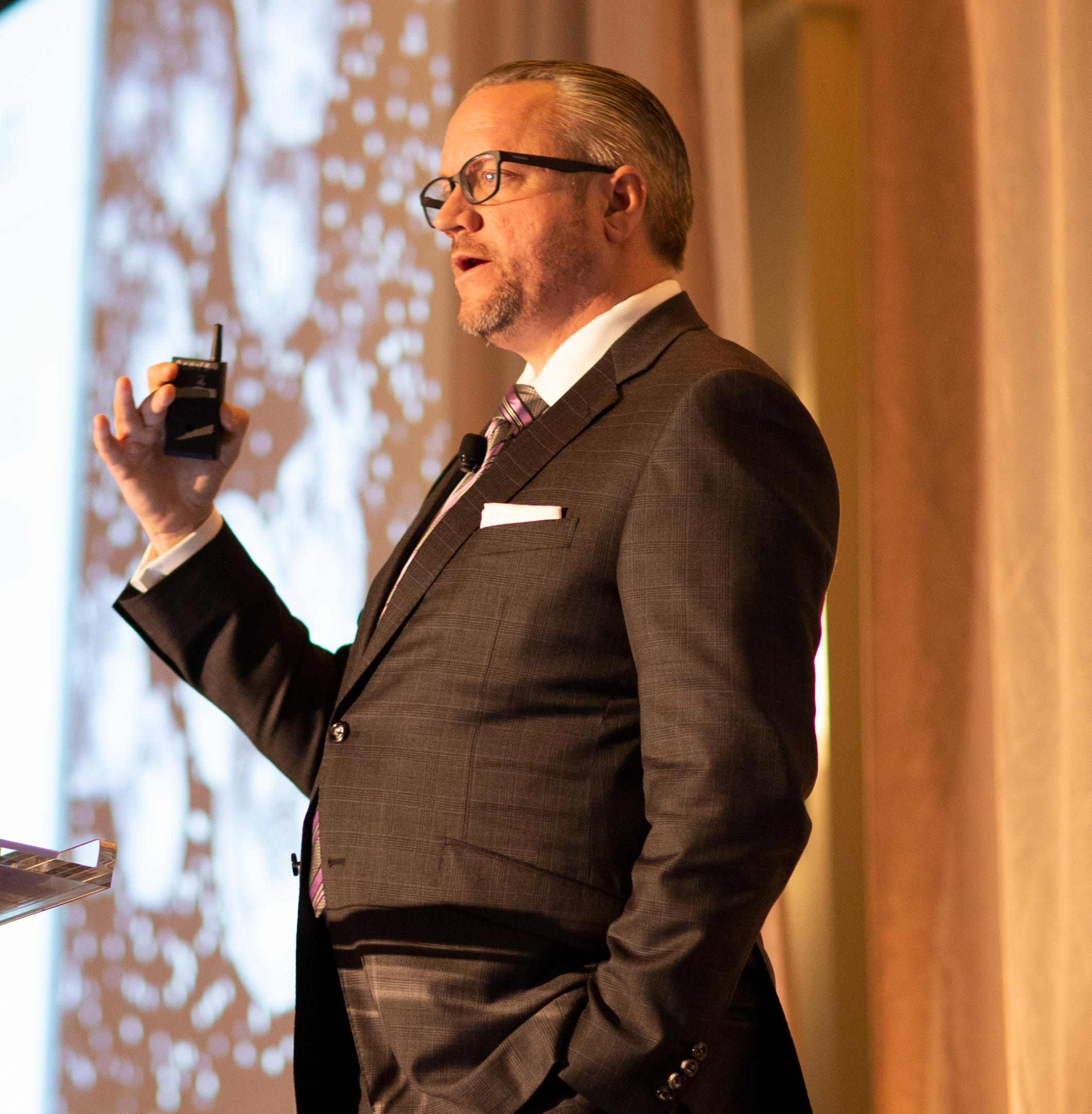
- Born: 1974; Torrance, California, U.S.
- Education: Newport Christian High School
- Occupation: Portfolio manager
- Title: Chief Investment Officer of The Bahnsen Group (since 2015)
- Board member of: National Review Institute; The King's College; Pacifica Christian High School
- Father: Greg Bahnsen
- Website: www.bahnsen.com

David Bahnsen (/ˈbɑːnsən/; born 1974) is an American portfolio manager, economist, author, and television commentator. He is the founder and Chief Investment Officer of The Bahnsen Group and a senior fellow at the National Review Institute. He is a contributor to Forbes, National Review, and Commentary.

Bahnsen has conservative political and classic liberalist economic views. He is a Christian and his father was Greg Bahnsen, a Christian apologist. He advocates that work has inherent dignity and purpose, a view he grounds in his Christian understanding of vocation, beyond economic utility. He supports free market policies, including lower corporate tax rates and reduced regulation. He is critical of the tariffs in the second Trump administration.

Before Bahnsen entered the finance industry, in the 1990s, he managed artists in the Christian music industry, including signing the Christian ska band The O.C. Supertones to Tooth & Nail Records, a successful Seattle-based record label responsible for launching MxPx and Underoath. After training as a financial advisor, he worked at Morgan Stanley for eight years, becoming a top 1200 advisor in the United States in 2014 before leaving to start his own firm. In 2025, he was ranked the top financial advisor in California by Forbes and a top 100 advisor in the United States by Barron's.

In 2023, he accused JPMorgan Chase of discriminatory debanking based on religious or conservative political views. He engaged in a multi-year campaign of shareholder activism with Jerry Bowyer and Alliance Defending Freedom (ADF), with whom he has an advisory role. Bahnsen was criticized by the Southern Poverty Law Center for failing to disclose his role with ADF in shareholder proposals. Chase denied engaging in any discriminatory bank closures, blaming instead federal regulations. More than 30 Republican state officials wrote letters to Chase's leadership with similar accusations, ultimately resulting in the bank explicitly adding religion and political views to their anti-discrimination policies in 2025. In August, President Donald Trump signed an executive order instructing regulators to investigate Chase and other banks over their debanking policies.

== Early life and education ==
Bahnsen was born in Torrance, California, and is the son of Greg Bahnsen, an American theologian and Calvinist philosopher. He attended Newport Christian High School (NCHS) where his father was a teacher.

He was interested in politics and the economy from a young age. He received a subscription to the National Review for his birthday while he was in elementary school and idolized Alex P. Keaton, a conservative, religious television character who wanted to work on Wall Street.

After a stint in the music industry, in the summer of 2001, Bahnsen entered the financial adviser training program at Paine Webber.

== Career and philanthropy ==
In the 1990s, Bahnsen ran a music artist management business, during which time he was the band manager for The O.C. Supertones, a Christian band that played ska. He helped the band achieve commercial success by modeling the secular music industry and seeking crossover potential with the market. As their manager, he secured a record deal with the Seattle label Tooth & Nail Records, alongside bands such as MxPx, Underoath, and Thousand Foot Krutch. At the time, it was the only Christian ska band with a recording contract. In 1998, he was appointed record label manager of KMG Records and signed The Straw Theory as one of its flagship artists. Bahnsen sold his artist management business when he was 27 and left the industry to work in finance.

While training as a financial advisor, Bahnsen worked at UBS Financial Services for five years. He then joined Morgan Stanley in 2007, where he was a managing director and wealth management executive for eight years. While at Morgan Stanley, Bahnsen founded Pacifica Christian High School in 2010 to fill the "geographical disparity" in faith-based high schools in the area after NCHS, his alma mater, closed in 1988. He has been on the school's board since 2013.

By 2015, Bahnsen was managing a portfolio with approximately US$750,000,000 in assets. He then founded The Bahnsen Group in Newport Beach, left Morgan Stanley because he said it had become "gigantic," and joined Hightower Advisors. In 2021, his firm was managing a US$2,100,000,000 portfolio. By 2023, the portfolio had doubled. In June 2024, the firm opened its 8th office in West Palm Beach, Florida. As of June 2025, the firm manages US$7,600,000,000 in assets among a team of 86 advisors.

Bahnsen joined the board of the National Review Institute in 2016, where he hosts the podcast Capital Record and he is a senior fellow as of November 2025. He was appointed to the board of trustees at The King's College in New York City in October 2017. Bahnsen is also a faculty member of the Acton Institute, the senior fellow of economics at the Center for Cultural Leadership, and faculty at the Blackstone Fellowship of the Alliance Defending Freedom.

== Views and commentary ==
Bahnsen writes on the intersection of markets and politics. He is a contributor for Forbes, the National Review, and Commentary. He is also the co-host of National Review's Radio Free California podcast and the host of the podcast Capital Record.

In August 2017, Bahnsen sent a letter to President Donald Trump asking him to pardon Michael Milken. He argued that Milken's prosecution was driven by prosecutorial overreach and public misunderstanding, asserting that Milken neither committed insider trading nor harmed capital markets. Instead, Bahnsen said Milken be celebrated for developing the high-yield debt market, which he described as innovation that enabled business growth by increasing access to capital. He maintained that Milken's innovations in high-yield finance were economically beneficial and that a presidential pardon would correct a historical injustice. Bahnsen himself did not recommend the use of high-yield bonds.

Bahnsen advocates for a classic liberal understanding of economics and society grounded in freedom based principles and what he calls "transcendent truths." He admires Milton Friedman and Ronald Reagan and seeks to preserve their intellectual legacy. He argued that Brexit in 2019 was good for the global economy, and thus good for the United Kingdom (UK) in an interview on CNBC. Bahnsen argued that the UK's departure from the European Union (EU) could create economic opportunities rather than solely financial risk. He contended that market volatility surrounding the vote obscured the potential for renewed competitiveness and investment outside EU regulatory structures. Bahnsen framed Brexit as a disruptive event that might yield long-term prosperity if accompanied by sound economic policy.

He argued in a 2024 podcast for the National Review that contemporary culture holds distorted attitudes toward work. He advocates for a renewed understanding of labor as a meaningful vocation rather than solely a means of income. He maintains that work possesses intrinsic dignity and value in both sacred and secular contexts.

=== Taxes and tariffs ===
During the First presidency of Donald Trump, Bahnsen characterized his proposed tax reforms, including consolidating income tax brackets and sharply reducing the corporate tax rate, as highly positive in principle, for the potential economic growth. However, he argued that the sweeping nature of the reforms made it unlikely they would survive intact, predicting that Congress would significantly scale back the measures during the legislative process. As his presidency progressed, Bahnsen expressed concern that the tax reform effort was being undermined by political mismanagement. In November 2017, Bahnsen hosted a round table on the Tax Cuts and Jobs Act and said that discussions with Ivanka Trump and Steven Mnuchin illustrated a lack of clarity and seriousness within the administration about the policy's economic objectives. He argued that lower corporate rates and simplified taxation would promote investment and economic growth, but that the administration had a lack of policy focus. He argues that lowering corporate tax rates expands investment, productivity, and wage growth by increasing free cash flow and improving capital allocation across the entire economy, while taxing accumulated wealth or capital undermines investment and economic growth by penalizing the resources that drive innovation and long-term prosperity.

Bahnsen has expressed support for free trade policies and has been critical of broad protectionist tariffs, arguing that they function as indirect taxes on consumers and introduce unnecessary uncertainty into financial markets. He maintains that tariffs are ineffective tools for restoring domestic manufacturing competitiveness and contends that market-driven exchange, rather than government intervention, is the most effective foundation for economic growth. On the podcast The Bulletin for Christianity Today, he argued that adding tariffs as a penance for slavery and child labor was fallacious and does nothing to address the immorality of the practice and stop it. He said that the tariffs in the second Trump administration purposefully misled consumers to believe that they would result in products like Nike shoes being made in America.

=== Debanking and JPMorgan Chase shareholder activism ===
In 2023, Bahnsen engaged in shareholder activism. He introduced a shareholder resolution to JPMorgan Chase calling for the bank to evaluate whether its policies and practices posed risks of discrimination against clients or employees on the basis of religion or political viewpoint. He criticized diversity, equity, and inclusion (DEI) and environmental, social, and governance (ESG) policies as enabling discrimination. He argued that major financial institutions had insufficient safeguards against viewpoint based debanking. He asserted that several high-profile account closures reflected a broader problem of ideological bias in the financial sector. After Chase sought to exclude his proposal, the Securities and Exchange Commission required the bank to allow it to proceed to a shareholder vote, a development Bahnsen described as a significant victory for transparency and accountability. Chase urged shareholders to vote against the proposal. 14 state treasurers and 19 state attorney generals from Republican-majority states wrote letters to Chase's leadership accusing the bank of closing accounts and discriminating against customers on the basis of political and religious beliefs, citing the closure of the National Committee for Religious Freedom who was screened with a religious and political questionnaire before reinstatement. Chase denied engaging in account closures on the basis of religious or political beliefs.

The following year, after the proposal earned only 2.3% approval, Bahnsen hired a fund consultant, Jerry Bowyer, to re-introduce the proposal. A second group, Alliance Defending Freedom (ADF), noticed a change to Chase's WePay terms, which prompted Bahnsen and Bowyer to withdraw the proposal. The terms of the language prohibited payments that met the "social risk" criteria, defined as "subject to allegation and impacts related to hate groups, systemic racism, sexual harassment and corporate culture." Chase said that the language was from 2017 when it purchased WePay. ADF worked with Tennessee legislators to enact a law prohibiting viewpoint-based debanking, the first statute of its kind in the United States. The law took effect on July 1, 2024.

In early 2025, after Bahnsen and Bowyer introduced a third shareholder proposal regarding the alleged practices, Chase argued that anti-money laundering laws were to blame for debanking, not discrimination. That March, Chase agreed to add explicit language to its policies to say it does "not tolerate discrimination ... based on ... religion, religious affiliation, or religious views ... political opinions, speech, or affiliations," by July of that year. The shareholder proposal was again withdrawn. In August, President Donald Trump signed an executive order directing federal regulators to investigate and punish banks for alleged discrimination of conservatives based on their religious or political affiliation. As of November 2025, Chase was under investigation for its debanking policies, with which they said they were fully cooperating.

The Southern Poverty Law Center (SLPC) criticized the debanking narrative, arguing that it constitutes a conspiracy theory advanced by Christian dominionist networks led by Bahnsen, who they characterized as a Christian supremacist with ties to hate groups. According to SPLC, claims of systematic banking discrimination against conservative Christians rely on anecdotal cases and ignore banks' denials and existing anti-discrimination laws. SPLC specifically criticized Bahnsen for not disclosing his advisory role with ADF’s Viewpoint Diversity Score program when filing proposals that cite the same program. The New York Times wrote that critics view the debanking narrative as a politically motivated and unsubstantiated claim of ideological persecution and that examples often reflect routine compliance decisions rather than targeted discrimination. A 2025 analysis in The National Law Review said that Trump's executive order prompted potential enforcement actions, but that regulators may face significant legal hurdles because existing statutes do not cover politically motivated account closures.

== Selected publications ==
- Bahnsen, David L. (2024). Full-time: work and the meaning of life. New York: Post Hill Press. ISBN 979-8-88845-073-4.
- Bahnsen, David (April 16, 2023). "My Bid to Make JPMorgan Less Woke". The Wall Street Journal.
- Bahnsen, David L. (2022–2023). "Woke Corporations: Cowardice and Crusaders for the Worst". Texas Review of Law and Politics. 27: 699.
- Bahnsen, David L. (April 1, 2021). "The Great California Exodus". National Review.
- Bahnsen, David L. (January 17, 2020). "The Wealth-Tax Horror". Commentary Magazine.
- Bahnsen, David L. (2019). The case for dividend growth: investing in a post-crisis world. New York: Post Hill Press. ISBN 978-1-64293-045-0.
- Bahnsen, David L.; French, David (2018). Crisis of responsibility: our cultural addiction to blame and how you can cure it. New York: Post Hill Press. ISBN 978-1-68261-625-3.

== Recognition ==
- Top 300 Advisors in America, Financial Times, 2017
- Top 250 Advisors, National, Forbes, 2025
- Top Advisor, California, Forbes, 2025
- America's Top 1200 Advisors, by state, Barron's, 2014–2025
- America's Top 100 Advisors, Barron's, 2025 (83)
