= Gary DeMar =

American writer and lecturer

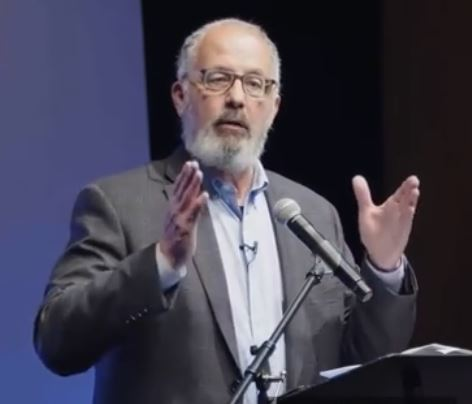
- Born: 1950 (age 75–76); Pennsylvania, US
- Education: Western Michigan University (1973); Reformed Theological Seminary Master of Divinity (1979); Whitefield Theological Seminary Doctor of Philosophy (2007)
- Occupations: author, speaker, radio presenter
- Title: President American Vision (Note: DeMar served as president twice: 1986–2015 and 2019–present); Senior Fellow American Vision (Note: DeMar served as Senior Fellow 2015–2019)
- Spouse: Carol
- Children: 2
- Website: garydemar.com

Gary DeMar is an American writer and lecturer. A former student of Greg Bahnsen, and protégé of Gary North, he has written several books on Christian reconstructionism, apologetics, and eschatology, as well as books targeting the homeschool movement.

DeMar is currently the president of The American Vision, a biblical worldview ministry. He hosts "The Gary DeMar Podcast."

DeMar is a graduate of Western Michigan University (B.S., 1973) and Reformed Theological Seminary (M.Div., 1979).

== Family life and education ==
DeMar graduated from Western Michigan University in 1973. In 1979, he earned a Master of Divinity degree from Reformed Theological Seminary, where he had been a student of Greg Bahnsen. He earned a Ph.D. in Christian Intellectual History from Whitefield Theological Seminary in 2007.

== Career ==
In the early years of the Christian reconstruction movement, DeMar collaborated with Gary North on several books. He has authored more than 35 books. After beginning his career at the height of reconstructionist publishing, DeMar has taken the more extreme reconstructionist view and tempered it for a more broad appeal.

DeMar began working at American Vision in 1981 as a research analyst. In 1986 he became the president of the organization. DeMar stepped aside as president of American Vision in 2015, while continuing in the role of Senior Fellow. He returned to the role of president in March 2019 when Joel McDurmon resigned.

DeMar is the host of "The Gary DeMar Podcast," which began in 2006 as a radio program and continued as a podcast.

== Views ==
=== Government ===
John W. Whitehead notes DeMar's book Ruler of the Nations "presents a clear and well-substantiated description of the three types of government established by God — the family, the church, and the civil government — each given its own specific and limited jurisdiction". Gary North states that Ruler of the Nations "has made the meaning of theocracy clear;" that it is not "a civil government that is run by the institutional church," but rather "the rule of God in every area of life". In the chapter titled Reconstructing Civil Government, DeMar writes:

All government requires a reference point. If God is to be pleased by men, the Bible must become the foundation of all their governments, including civil government. This means that Biblical law must be made the foundation of all righteous judgment in every government: personal (self government), ecclesiastical, familial, and civil.

DeMar states in an article on the American Vision web site, "Darwinism has secularized everything in America, including our understanding of the Constitution".

=== Eschatology ===
DeMar is a proponent of preterism, interpreting the Olivet Discourse as specific to the generation to whom Jesus was speaking in Matthew 24.

== Criticism ==
The Southern Poverty Law Center describes DeMar as "an outspoken anti-gay activist who regularly hosts and speaks at Christian-right events," and American Vision as an extremist group and an organization advocating "a complete theocracy governed by Old Testament law."

== Selected works ==
- — (1982). God and Government.
- — (1987). Ruler of the Nations. Dominion Press. ISBN 9780930462192.
- — (1988). The Reduction of Christianity. Dominion Press. ISBN 9780915815067.
- — (1988). Surviving College Successfully.
- — (1988). Something Greater Is Here.
- — (1991). Christian Reconstruction.
- — (1991). You've Heard It Said. Wolgemuth & Hyatt. ISBN 9781561210497.
- — (1993). America's Christian History: The Untold Story.
- — (1994). War of the Worldviews. Powder Springs, Georgia: American Vision. ISBN 9780915815128.
- — (1999). Last Days Madness. Powder Springs, Georgia: American Vision. ISBN 9780915815357.
- — (1999). Is Jesus Coming Soon?. Powder Springs, Georgia: American Vision, Inc. ISBN 9780915815364.
- — (2001). Thinking Straight in a Crooked World.
- — (2001). End Times Fiction: A Biblical Consideration of the Left Behind Theology. Thomas Nelson Publishers. ISBN 9780785266426.
- — (2002). The Changing Face of Islam in History and Prophecy.
- — (2002). America's Christian Heritage.
- — (2004). Myths, Lies, & Half Truths. Powder Springs, Georgia: American Vision. ISBN 9780915815456.
- — (2005). The Early Church and the End of the World. Powder Springs, Georgia: American Vision. ISBN 9780915815586.
- — (2007). Whoever Controls the Schools Rules the World. Powder Springs, Georgia: American Vision. ISBN 9780915815647.
- — (2008). Memory Mechanics.
- — (2009). America's 200-Year War with Islamic Terrorism.
- — (2009). Movies with Worldviews in Mind.
- — (2009). Doomsday Deja Vu.
- — (2009). Meaty Tales!.
- — (2009). Why the End of the World Is Not in Your Future. Powder Springs, Georgia: American Vision Press. ISBN 9780915815944.
- — (2009). Left Behind: Separating Fact from Fiction. Powder Springs, Georgia: American Vision Press. ISBN 9780915815388.
- — (2010). 10 Popular Prophecy Myths Exposed. Powder Springs, Georgia: American Vision Press. ISBN 9780982610558.

== See also ==
- American Vision
