= Postmillennialism =

Christian concept

In Christian eschatology (end-times theology), postmillennialism, or postmillenarianism, is an interpretation of chapter 20 of the Book of Revelation which sees Christ's second coming as occurring after (Latin post-) the "Millennium", a messianic age in which Christian ethics prosper. The term subsumes several similar views of the end times, and it stands in contrast to premillennialism and, to a lesser extent, amillennialism (see Summary of Christian eschatological differences).

Postmillennialism holds that Jesus Christ established his kingdom on Earth through his preaching and redemptive work in the first century and that he equips his church with the gospel, empowers the church by the Spirit, and charges the church with the Great Commission (Matthew 28:19) to be disciples to all nations. Postmillennialism expects that eventually the vast majority of people living will be saved. Increasing gospel success will gradually produce a time in history prior to Christ's return in which faith, righteousness, peace, and prosperity will prevail in the affairs of men and of nations. After an extensive era of such conditions Jesus Christ will return visibly, bodily, and gloriously, to end history with the general resurrection and the final judgment after which the eternal order follows.

Postmillennialism was a dominant theological belief among American Protestants who promoted reform movements in the 19th and 20th centuries such as abolitionism and the Social Gospel. Postmillennialism has become one of the key tenets of a movement known as Christian reconstructionism. It was criticized in the 20th century by theological conservatives as an attempt to immanentize the eschaton (create heaven on Earth).

== Background ==
The Savoy Declaration of 1658 contains one of the earliest creedal statements of a postmillennial eschatology:

As the Lord in his care and love towards his Church, hath in his infinite wise providence exercised it with great variety in all ages, for the good of them that love him, and his own glory; so according to his promise, we expect that in the latter days, antichrist being destroyed, the Jews called, and the adversaries of the kingdom of his dear Son broken, the churches of Christ being enlarged, and edified through a free and plentiful communication of light and grace, shall enjoy in this world a more quiet, peaceable and glorious condition than they have enjoyed.

John Jefferson Davis notes that the postmillennial outlook was articulated by men like John Owen in the 17th century, Jonathan Edwards in the 18th century, and Charles Hodge in the 19th century. Davis argues that it was the dominant view in the nineteenth century, but was eclipsed by the other millennial positions by the end of World War I due to the "pessimism and disillusionment engendered by wartime conditions".

== Reforms ==
George M. Fredrickson argues, "The belief that a religious revival and the resulting improvement in human faith and morals would eventually usher in a thousand years of peace and justice antecedent to the Second Coming of Christ was an impetus to the promotion of Progressive reforms, as historians have frequently pointed out." During the Second Great Awakening of the 1830s, some divines expected the millennium to arrive in a few years. By the 1840s, however, the great day had receded to the distant future, and post-millennialism became the religious dimension of the broader American middle-class ideology of steady moral and material progress.

== Key ideas ==
Although some postmillennialists hold to a literal millennium of 1,000 years, other postmillennialists see the thousand years more as a figurative term for a long period of time (similar in that respect to amillennialism). Among those holding to a non-literal "millennium" it is usually understood to have already begun, which implies a less obvious and less dramatic kind of millennium than that typically envisioned by premillennialists, as well as a more unexpected return of Christ.

Postmillennialism also teaches that the forces of Satan will gradually be defeated by the expansion of the Kingdom of God throughout history up until the second coming of Christ. This belief that good will gradually triumph over evil has led proponents of postmillennialism to label themselves "optimillennialists" in contrast to "pessimillennial" premillennialists and amillennialists.

Many postmillennialists also adopt some form of preterism, which holds that many of the end times prophecies in the Bible have already been fulfilled. Several key postmillennialists, however, did not adopt full preterism, but rather a partial preterism with respect to the Book of Revelation, among them B. B. Warfield and Francis Nigel Lee.

Other postmillennialists hold to the idealist position of Revelation. The book titled An A-to-Z Guide to Biblical Prophecy and the End Times defines Idealism as "A symbolic description of the on going battle between God and evil." Those who hold to this view include: R. J. Rushdoony and P. Andrew Sandlin.

== Types ==
=== Difference in extent ===
Comparison of Christian millennial interpretations

Postmillennialists diverge on the extent of the gospel's conquest. The majority of postmillennialists do believe in an apostasy, and like B. B. Warfield, believe the apostasy refers to the Jewish people's rejection of Christianity either during the first century or possibly until the return of Christ at the end of the millennium. This postmillennial perspective essentially dovetails with the thinking of amillennial and premillennial schools of eschatology.

There is a minority of postmillennial scholars, however, who discount the idea of a final apostasy, regarding the gospel conquest ignited by the Great Commission to be total and absolute, such that no unsaved individuals will remain after the Spirit has been fully poured out on all flesh. This minority school, promoted by B. B. Warfield and supported by exegetical work of H. A. W. Meyer, has started to gain more ground, even altering the thinking of some postmillennialists previously in the majority camp, such as Loraine Boettner and R. J. Rushdoony.

The appeal of the minority position, apart from its obvious gambit of taking key scriptures literally (John 12:32; Romans 11:25–26; Hebrews 10:13; Isaiah 2:4; 9:7; etc.), was voiced by Boettner himself after his shift in position: the majority-form of postmillennialism lacks a capstone, which Warfield's version does not fail to provide. Warfield also linked his views to an unusual understanding of Matthew 5:18, premised on Meyer's exegesis of the same passage, which presupposed a global conquest of the gospel in order for the supposed prophecy in that verse to be realized, which inexorably leads to a literal fulfillment of the third petition of the Lord's Prayer: "Thy will be done on Earth, as it is in Heaven."

John Calvin's exposition of that part of the Lord's Prayer all but adopts the minority postmillennial position but Calvin, and later Charles Spurgeon, were remarkably inconsistent on eschatological matters. Spurgeon delivered a sermon on Psalm 72 explicitly defending the form of absolute postmillennialism held by the minority camp today, but on other occasions he defended premillennialism. Moreover, given the nature of Warfield's views, Warfield disdained the millennial labels, preferring the term "eschatological universalism" for the brand of postmillennialism now associated with his thinking.

Warfield, like those who follow in his footsteps, did not seek to support his doctrine of cosmic eschatology from Revelation 20, treating that passage (following Kliefoth, Duesterdieck, and Milligan) as descriptive of the intermediate state and the contrast between church militant and triumphant. This tactic represented an abandonment of the Augustinian approach to the passage, ostensibly justified by a perceived advance in taking the Book of Revelation's parallel passages to the little season of Satan more seriously (cf. Revelation 6:11 and 12:12).

=== Difference in means ===
Postmillennialists also diverge on the means of the gospel's conquest. Revivalist postmillennialism is a form of the doctrine held by the Puritans and some today that teaches that the millennium will come about not from Christians changing society from the top down (that is, through its political and legal institutions) but from the bottom up at the grass roots level (that is, through changing people's hearts and minds).

Reconstructionist postmillennialism, on the other hand, sees that along with grass roots preaching of the Gospel and explicitly Christian education, Christians should also set about changing society's legal and political institutions in accordance with biblical, and also sometimes theonomic, ethics (see dominion theology). The revivalists deny that the same legal and political rules which applied to theocratic state of Ancient Israel should apply directly to modern societies which are no longer directly ruled by Israel's prophets, priests, and kings. In the United States, the most prominent and organized forms of postmillennialism are based on Christian reconstructionism and hold to a reconstructionist form of postmillennialism advanced by R. J. Rushdoony, Gary North, Kenneth Gentry, and Greg Bahnsen.

== See also ==
- Calvinism and Neo-Calvinism
- Adventist Church of Promise
- Christian eschatology
- Disciples of Christ (Campbell Movement)
- Progressive Christianity
- Summary of Christian eschatological differences

== Bibliography ==
- Bahnsen, Greg L. Victory in Jesus: The Bright Hope of Postmillennialism. Texarkana, AR: Covenant Media Press, 1999. (ISBN 0-9678317-1-7)
- Bass, Ralph E., Jr. Back to the Future: A Study in the Book of Revelation. Greenville, SC: Living Hope Press, 2004. (ISBN 0-9759547-0-9)
- Bock, Darrell. Three Views of the Millennium and Beyond. Grand Rapids, MI: Zondervan, 1999.
- Boettner, Loraine. The Millennium. Philipsburg, NJ: Presbyterian & Reformed, 1984. (ISBN 0-87552-113-4)
- Davis, John Jefferson. The Victory of Christ's Kingdom: An Introduction to Postmillennialism. Moscow, ID: Canon Press, 1996.
- DeMar, Gary. Last Days Madness: Obsession of the Modern Church. Power Springs, GA: American Vision, 1999. (ISBN 0-915815-35-4)
- Fredrickson, George M. "The Coming of the Lord: The Northern Protestant Clergy and the Civil War Crisis." Religion and the American Civil War. Edited by Randall M. Miller, Harry S. Stout, and Charles Reagan Wilson. New York, NY: Oxford University Press, 1998.
- Gentry, Kenneth L. He Shall Have Dominion: A Postmillennial Eschatology. Tyler, TX: Institute For Christian Economics, 1992.
- Gentry, Kenneth L. Thine is the Kingdom: A Study of the Postmillennial Hope. Vallecito, CA: Chalcedon Foundation, 2003.
- Kik, J. Marcellus. An Eschatology of Victory. Philipsburg, NJ: Presbyterian & Reformed, 1971.
- Mathison, Keith A. Postmillennialism. An Eschatology of Hope. Philipsburg, NJ: P&R Publishing, 1999. (ISBN 0-87552-389-7) – Good one-volume overview of Postmillennialism. Written by a proponent.
- Murray, Iain. The Puritan Hope: A Study in Revival and the Interpretation of Prophecy. London, UK: Banner of Truth Trust, 1971.
- North, Gary. Millennialism and Social Theory. Tyler, TX: Institute For Christian Economics, 1990.
- Sexton, Jeremy. "Postmillennialism: A Biblical Critique," Themelios 48.3 (2023): 552-72
- Sproul, R. C. The Last Days According to Jesus. Grand Rapids, MI: Baker Books, 1998. (ISBN 0-8010-1171-X)
