= American Vision =

US nonprofit organization

- Founded: 1978
- Founder: Steve Schiffman
- Type: Nonprofit 501(c)(3)
- Tax ID no.: 58-1374143 (EIN)
- Location(s): 3150-A Florence Road; Suite 2 Powder Springs, GA 30127
- Members: 5
- Key people: Gary DeMar, President
- Revenue: $1,315,150 (2010)
- Employees: 12
- Website: americanvision.org

American Vision is a United States nonprofit organization founded in 1978 by Steve Schiffman. It operates as a Christian ministry, and calls for "equipping and empowering Christians to restore America’s biblical foundation." The organization promotes Christian reconstructionism and postmillennialism, and opposes dispensationalism. Gary DeMar was the organization's president from 1986 to 2015. From 2015 to March 2019 Joel McDurmon was president, during which time DeMar was Senior Fellow. Gary DeMar returned as president in March 2019 when McDurmon resigned.

== Activities ==
American Vision publishes books "primarily for use in Christian schools and for home schoolers." The group is active in the creation science movement.

American Vision trains parents, teachers, pastors and activists "in developing family-oriented biblical worldviews." It hosts an annual "Worldview Conference", which has featured speakers such as Herbert Titus.

== Beliefs ==
American Vision is opposed to abortion. The group maintains that the First Amendment's demand that "Congress shall make no law respecting an establishment of religion, or prohibiting the free exercise thereof" means that Congress may not establish a state religion. The group maintains that the First Amendment does not prohibit members of Congress from making laws that are in submission to the Bible. DeMar has said that not all homosexuals would be executed under a "reconstructed government" but that he did believe that the occasional execution of "sodomites" would serve society well because "the law that requires the death penalty for homosexual acts effectively drives the perversion of homosexuality underground, back into the closet"

DeMar also wrote a "long-term goal" should be "the execution of abortionists and parents who hire them". Islam is another enemy; in August 2010 he said that "the long-term goal of Islam is the abolition of our constitutional freedoms."

In 2010, the Southern Poverty Law Center designated American Vision as an anti-gay hate group because of its purported support of the "death penalty for practicing homosexuals." However, Joel McDurmon, the former president of American Vision, moved the organization away from this position, stating that "Biblical law has transferred First Table punishments from earthly civil governments to the throne of heaven", and that right now only the moral principles are still binding.

== See also ==
- Chalcedon Foundation - Related organization
- Christian nationalism
- Christian reconstructionism
- Dominion theology
- Evangelicalism in the United States
- Neo-Calvinism
- Protestant fundamentalism
- Religious right
- Theoconservatism
