= Religious right in the United States =

The Religious Right in the United States, have been studied and analyzed. The words theoconservatism and theocon are portmanteaus of "theocracy" and "conservatism"/"conservative" coined as variants of "neoconservatism" and "neocon". They have been used as labels, sometimes pejorative, referring to members of the Christian right, particularly those whose ideology represents a synthesis of elements of American conservatism, conservative Christianity, and social conservatism, expressed through political means. The term theocon first appeared in 1996 in an article in The New Republic entitled "Neocon v. Theocon" by Jacob Heilbrunn, where he wrote:

[T]he neoconservatives believe that America is special because it was founded on an idea—a commitment to the rights of man embodied in the Declaration of Independence—not in ethnic or religious affiliations. The theocons, too, argue that America is rooted in an idea, but they believe that idea is Christianity.

Mainstream media have used the terms to identify religious conservatives. Journalist Andrew Sullivan has commonly used the concept, as have political cartoonists Cox & Forkum in reference to former Florida Secretary of State Katherine Harris.

== Notable people ==
- Hadley Arkes
- Stephen Barr
- Mary Eberstadt
- Robert P. George
- Mary Ann Glendon
- Mike Johnson
- Michael Novak
- Kate O'Beirne
- Ramesh Ponnuru
- Robert Royal
- George Weigel

== See also ==
- Christian nationalism
- Christian Patriot movement
- Christian reconstructionism
- Dominion theology
- Traditionalist conservatism
