= Andrew Sandlin =

American pastor and theologian

P. Andrew Sandlin is an American Christian minister, cultural theologian, and author. He is the founder and president of the Center for Cultural Leadership in Coulterville, California; De Yong Distinguished Visiting Professor of Culture and Theology at Edinburg Theological Seminary in Pharr, Texas; and core faculty at Evan Runner International Academy for Cultural Leadership of the Ezra Institute for Contemporary Christianity in Grimsby, Ontario. He was formerly president of the National Reform Association and executive vice president of the Chalcedon Foundation.

== Education ==
Sandlin holds a B.A. in liberal studies concentrating in English, history, and political science from the University of the State of New York (1991), an M.A. in English literature from the University of South Africa (1993), and an S.T.D. in Theology and Ecclesiastical History from Edinburg Theological Seminary (2007), United States extension of Universidad Juan Calvino of Mexico City. He also did Ph.D. studies in English at Kent State University in 1994.

== Ministries ==
He is a minister in the Fellowship of Mere Christianity and was pastor at Church of the Word, Painesville, Ohio (1984-1995) and Cornerstone Bible Church, Scotts Valley, California (2004-2014).

== Theology ==
An Evangelical Protestant committed to the neo-Reformational paradigm of Abraham Kuyper, Herman Bavinck, Herman Dooyeweerd, and Cornelius Van Til, Sandlin is a critic of both conservative and progressive theological trends. He is considered an extreme Christian Reconstructionist by Americans United for Separation of Church and State. He was targeted by Right Wing Watch, a program of People for the American Way, for arguing that “Christians Must Be Conservative, And Conservatives Must Be Christian." He advocates a unity of Law and Gospel, traditionally distinguished among Protestant Christians, and he was an early critic of "Biblical Patriarchy."

== Bibliography ==
He has written and edited several books:

- New Flesh, New Earth: The Life-Changing Power of the Resurrection (Oakdown, 2003)
- Backbone of the Bible: The Covenant in Contemporary Perspective (ed., Covenant Media, 2004)
- Un-Inventing the Church: Toward a Modest Ecclesiology (Center for Cultural Leadership, 2007)
- A Faith That Is Never Alone: A Response to Westminster Seminary California (ed., Kerygma, 2007)
- Christian Culture: An Introduction (Center for Cultural Leadership, 2013).

In addition, he has published numerous essays and articles, both scholarly and popular, in publications such as Free Inquiry, Christian Statesman, The New Rambler, The Modern Age, and the Reformation and Revival Journal. His article on a neo-Reformational defense of environmental stewardship in Free Inquiry, published by The Council for Secular Humanism, was the first avowedly Christian article in that magazine's history.
