= TheocracyWatch =

TheocracyWatch is a project run by the Center for Religion, Ethics and Social Policy (CRESP) at Cornell University. It was founded by Joan Bokaer, an environmental activist because, she says, "After the 2000 election she realized that few people understood that the religious right had taken working control of the Republican Party..."

TheocracyWatch's major area of interest is what it considers to be the influence of dominionism in the U.S. government. TheocracyWatch has a "mission to spread the word about the complete restructuring of our government. We want to get the word out to as many people as possible because the agenda of the Christian right is to replace the Constitution with biblical law," said Kathleen Damiani, president of TheocracyWatch.

TheocracyWatch's method for gauging the influence of dominionism is studying the voting patterns of members of Congress. Legislators whose voting pattern matches such organizations as the Christian Coalition, the Family Research Council, the Eagle Forum, and The Heritage Foundation are said to "illustrate the strength of dominionists in Congress" even though none of these groups identifies themselves with the dominionist movement and two of them are specifically secular.

TheocracyWatch makes free videos available to the general public so they can be distributed through public-access television stations.

The Center for Religion, Ethics and Social Policy is an independent not-for-profit agency and an affiliate of Cornell University with administrative offices in Cornell's Anabel Taylor Hall. TheocracyWatch is one of sixteen projects sponsored by CRESP.

== See also ==
- Theocracy
- Right Wing Watch
