= Theonomy =

Christian form of government ruled by divine law

Overview
- Type: Form of government / Theological concept
- Focus: Rule by divine law (specifically Old Testament judicial laws)
- Associated movement: Christian reconstructionism
- Chief architects: R. J. Rushdoony; Greg Bahnsen; Gary North
- Theological tradition: Reformed theology / Calvinism
- Related concepts: Dominion theology; Christian right; Postmillennialism

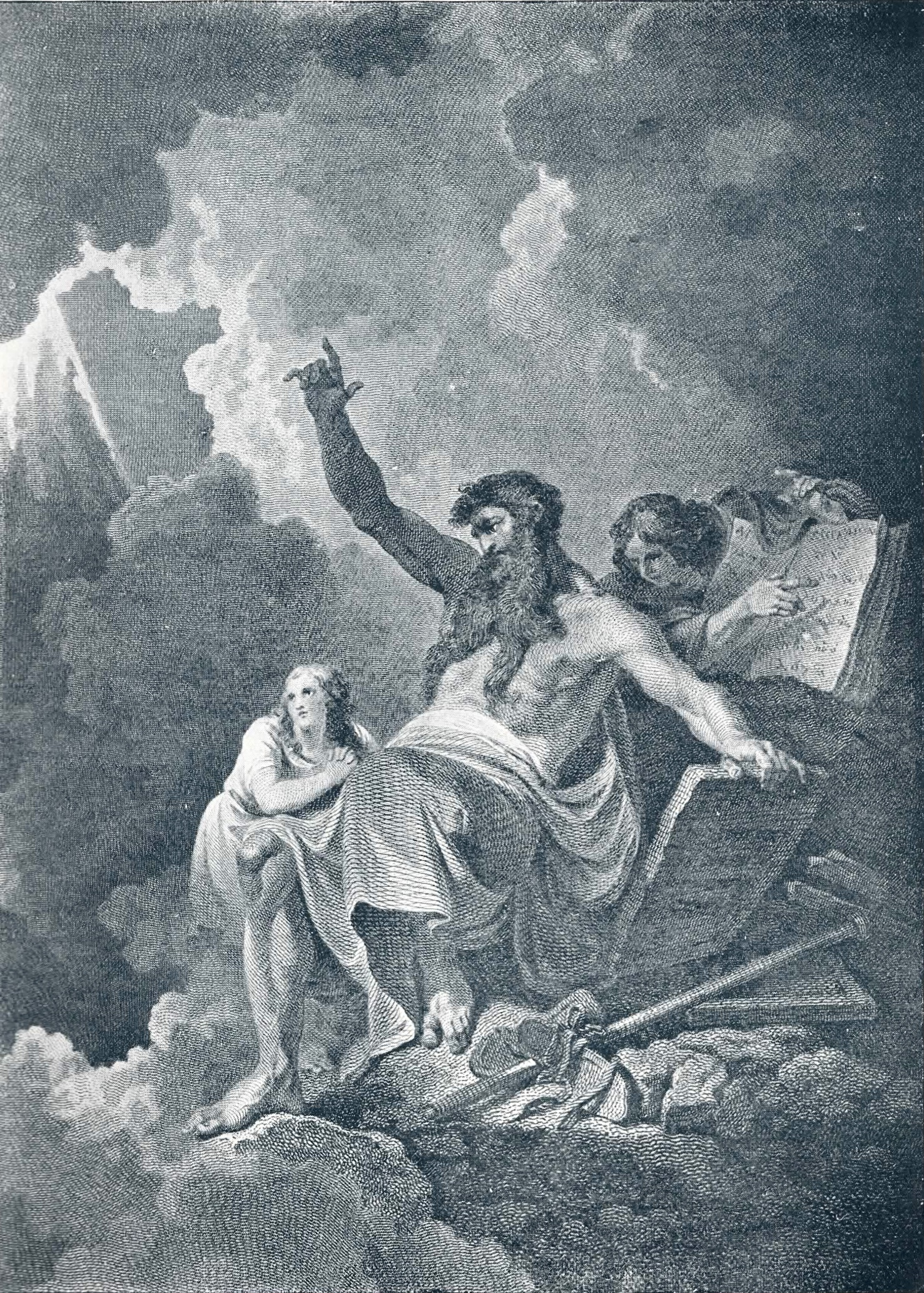
1896 illustration depicting Moses receiving the Ten Commandments

Theonomy (from Ancient Greek θεός (theós) 'god' and νόμος (nómos) 'law') is a hypothetical Christian form of government in which divine law governs societies. Theonomists hold that societies should observe divine law, particularly the Old Testament’s judicial laws. The movement’s chief architects were Gary North, Greg Bahnsen, and R.J. Rushdoony.

Theonomy presumes biblical Israel's Old Covenant judicial laws have not been abrogated, and therefore all civil governments must enforce them (including the specific penalties). Theonomy holds that all civil governments must refrain from coercion if Scripture has not prescribed their intervention (the "regulative principle of the state").

Theonomy is distinct from the "theonomous ethics" proposed by Paul Tillich.

== Origin ==
Thomas Aquinas held, "if a sovereign were to order these judicial precepts to be observed in his kingdom, he would not sin." Some have mistakenly referred to that as "General Equity Theonomy" but it is in fact distinct from theonomy insofar as Aquinas believed the specifics of the Old Testament judicial laws were no longer binding. He instead taught that the judicial precepts contained varying degrees of universal principles of justice that reflected natural law.

In Christian reconstructionism, theonomy is the idea that God provides the basis of both personal and social ethics in the Bible. Theonomic ethics asserts that the Bible has been given as the abiding standard for all human authority (individual, family, church, and civil) and that biblical law must be incorporated into a Christian theory of biblical ethics.

Theonomic ethics, to put it simply, represents a commitment to the necessity, sufficiency, and unity of Scripture. For an adequate and genuinely Christian ethic, we must have God's word, only God's word, and all of God's word. Nearly every critic of theonomic ethics will be found denying, in some way, one or more of these premises.

— The Theonomic Antithesis to Other Law-Attitudes

Theonomy posits that the biblical law is applicable to civil law, and theonomists propose biblical law as the standard by which laws may be measured and to which they ought to be conformed.

== Goals ==
Various theonomic authors have stated such goals as "the universal development of Biblical theocratic republics," exclusion of non-Christians from voting and citizenship, and the application of Biblical law by the state. Under such a system of biblical law, homosexual acts, adultery, witchcraft, and blasphemy would be punishable by death. Propagation of idolatry or "false religions" would be illegal and could also be punished by the death penalty.

More recent theonomic writers such as Joel McDurmon, former President of American Vision, have moved away from this position, stating that these death penalties are no longer binding in the new covenant. Former pastor and theonomy critic, J.D. Hall, who debated McDurmon in 2015, has argued that abandoning Mosaic penologies such as the death penalty means that McDurmon and others who hold similar positions cannot be said to hold to theonomy in any meaningful way.

According to the theonomist Greg Bahnsen, the laws of God are the standard which Christian voters and officials ought to pursue. The civil law given to the nation of Israel, it is stated, is continuously binding, although apart from what he considers to be surrounding cultural connotations specific to this nation itself.

== Relation to Reformed theology ==
Some in modern Reformed churches criticize any relationship between the historical Reformed faith and theonomy, but other Calvinists affirm that theonomy is consistent with the historic Reformed confessions.

== See also ==
Related topics in Christianity:

- Canon law of the Catholic Church
- Divine command theory
- Christian reconstructionism
- Biblical law in Christianity
- Neo-Calvinism
- Law and Gospel
- Christian anarchism
- Theodemocracy
- Christian views on the Old Covenant
- The Handmaid's Tale
- Postmillennialism

Related topics in philosophy and other religions:

- Blasphemy law
- Macroethics and microethics
- Halachic state
- Halakha
- Islamism
- Religious censorship
- Religious law
- Sharia
