= Julie Ingersoll =

American religious studies scholar

Julie J. Ingersoll is an American religious studies scholar. She is Professor of Religious Studies at the University of North Florida.

Ingersoll is from Maine, and studied at Rutgers College and George Washington University before obtaining a Ph.D in Religious Studies from the University of California, Santa Barbara. She previously taught at Millsaps College, Rhodes College, and Southwest Missouri State University.

Ingersoll specializes in Christianity and gender and Christian Reconstructionism. She wrote Evangelical Christian Women: War Stories in the Gender Battles (New York University Press) in 2003, in which she suggested that "an unequivocal commitment to complementarian gender roles currently ranks for this generation of evangelicals as a paramount priority, as significant as the debate on biblical inerrancy was in the previous generation." In 2015 she wrote Building God's Kingdom: Inside the World of Christian Reconstruction (Oxford University Press). There she argued that "core Reconstructionist ideas have exerted an outsized influence on political, cultural, and legal life" in the United States. Ingersoll has also contributed articles to the Huffington Post and Religion Dispatches.
