= Greg Bahnsen =

American theologian and philosopher (1948–1995)

Gregory Lyle Bahnsen
- Born: September 17, 1948; Auburn, Washington, U.S.
- Died: December 11, 1995 (aged 47)
- Children: David Bahnsen

Education
- Education: Westmont College (BA); Westminster Theological Seminary (MDiv, ThM); University of Southern California (PhD)
- Thesis: A conditional resolution of the apparent paradox of self-deception (1978)
- Doctoral advisor: Dallas Willard

Philosophical work
- Era: 20th-century philosophy
- Region: Western philosophy
- School: Presuppositionalism, Christian philosophy
- Notable ideas: Presuppositional apologetics, postmillennialism, theonomy

Greg Bahnsen (/ˈbɑːnsən/; September 17, 1948 – December 11, 1995) was an American Calvinist philosopher and Christian apologist. He was a minister in the Orthodox Presbyterian Church and a full-time Scholar in Residence for the Southern California Center for Christian Studies (SCCCS). He is also considered a contributor to the field of Christian apologetics, as he popularized the presuppositional method of Cornelius Van Til. He is the father of David Bahnsen, an American portfolio manager, author, and television commentator.

== Early life and education ==
He was the first born of two sons of Robert and Virginia Bahnsen in Auburn, Washington, and grew up in Pico Rivera, California. In youth he was beset by a number of medical difficulties, the most serious of which was a lifelong platelet problem that made it difficult for him to stop bleeding, a condition similar to hæmophilia. He also had heart trouble which came to light only during his first college admissions medical exam.

Raised in the Orthodox Presbyterian Church, he actively participated in religious activities. He first began reading the apologetics of Cornelius Van Til when in high school. While attending Westmont College he began writing for the Chalcedon Foundation of Rousas J. Rushdoony and soon came to admire the latter's strong Calvinistic convictions.

In 1970 Bahnsen graduated magna cum laude from Westmont College, receiving his B.A. in philosophy as well as the John Bunyan Smith Award for his overall grade point average. From there he went on to Westminster Theological Seminary in Philadelphia, where he studied under Cornelius Van Til. The two became close friends. When he graduated in May 1973, he simultaneously received two degrees, Master of Divinity and Master of Theology, as well as the William Benton Greene Prize in apologetics and a Richard Weaver Fellowship from the Intercollegiate Studies Institute. His next academic stop was the University of Southern California (USC), where he studied philosophy, specializing in the theory of knowledge. In 1975, after receiving ordination in the Orthodox Presbyterian Church, he became an associate professor of Apologetics and Ethics at Reformed Theological Seminary (RTS) in Jackson, Mississippi. While there, he completed his studies at USC, receiving his Ph.D. in 1978. Bahnsen's four years at RTS were fraught with contention, centered around his particular version of theonomic postmillennialism.

== Later life ==
Bahnsen taught at Newport Christian High School where his son was also a student.

One of the original pillars of Christian Reconstruction, Bahnsen was a leading proponent of theonomy, postmillennialism, and presuppositional apologetics. He lectured to a broad range of evangelical Christian groups at many colleges and conferences, not only throughout the United States, but also in Scotland and Russia. He published over 1700 audio tapes, videos, articles, and books.

Greg Bahnsen's vocal advocacy of Christian Reconstructionism and theonomy was highly controversial during his lifetime, and a public disputation pertaining to theonomy led to his dismissal from the Reformed Theological Seminary in Jackson, Mississippi. In addition, he was known for his public debates on apologetics, theonomy, religion (such as Roman Catholicism, Islam, and Judaism), and a variety of socio-political issues (such as abortion, gun control, and homosexuality).

Bahnsen had a number of public debates with atheists including George H. Smith, Gordon Stein, and Edward Tabash. The debate with Stein marked one of the earliest uses of a transcendental argument for the existence of God (TAG).

In 1994 a controversy emerged after atheist philosopher Michael Martin was informed three weeks before a scheduled debate with Bahnsen "that Bahnsen would not debate unless Martin gave written permission to SCCCS to tape the debate" for resale to support SCCCS. Martin refused because "he did not want SCCCS to profit from his participation", while SCCCS refused to let Bahnsen debate without the debate being taped. The debate was canceled. Since that time Martin has responded to Bahnsen's use of TAG, doing so in his own debates with Michael Butler, John Frame, and Douglas Jones, and has published his "Transcendental Argument for the Non-Existence of God" in the journal of the New Zealand Association of Rationalists and Humanists, as well as in essays posted on the Secular Web.

== Death ==
Due to his lifelong medical problems, Bahnsen had to undergo a third aortic valve implant surgery on December 5, 1995. After the completion of the operation, serious complications developed within twenty-four hours. He then became comatose for several days and died on December 11, 1995, at the age of 47.

== Works ==
- Always Ready: Directions for Defending the Faith (ISBN 0692124187)
- Van Til's Apologetic: Readings and Analysis (ISBN 0-87552-098-7)
- Theonomy in Christian Ethics (ISBN 0-9678317-3-3)
- By This Standard: The Authority Of God's Law Today ISBN 0-930464-06-0
- No Other Standard: Theonomy and Its Critics ISBN 0-930464-56-7
- House Divided: The Breakup of Dispensational Theology with Kenneth Gentry. ISBN 0-930464-27-3
- Homosexuality: A Biblical View (ISBN 0-8010-0744-5)
- Five Views on Law and Gospel (Chapter contribution) (ISBN 0-310-21271-5)
- Foundations of Christian Scholarship (2 Chapter Contributions) (ISBN 1-879998-25-4)
- God and Politics: Four Views on the Reformation of Civil Government (Chapter contribution) (ISBN 0-87552-448-6)
- Theonomy: An Informed Response (2 Chapter contributions) (ISBN 0-930464-59-1)
- Victory in Jesus: The Bright Hope of Postmillennialism (ISBN 0-9678317-1-7)
- Presuppositional Apologetics: Stated and Defended (Edited by Joel McDurmon.) (ISBN 0-915815-55-9)
