= The Institutes of Biblical Law =

1973 book by Rousas John Rushdoony

- Cover
- Author: Rousas John Rushdoony
- Language: English
- Subject: Theonomy
- Publisher: The Craig Press
- Publication date: 1973
- Publication place: United States
- Media type: Print (Hardcover)
- Pages: 890
- ISBN: 978-0875524108

The Institutes of Biblical Law is a 1973 book by the philosopher and theologian Rousas John Rushdoony. It is the first volume of a three-volume work, also referred to by the same title, which is modeled after John Calvin's Institutes of the Christian Religion (1536).

== Summary ==
Rushdoony expounds on the Ten Commandments which is central to his work. He interprets these commandments, as found in the Old Testament of the Bible, as the foundation of moral and ethical principles for both individual behavior and the governance of societies. He advocates for a theonomic perspective, which means that he believes God's law, as revealed in the Bible, should be the standard and authority for civil law and government. Rushdoony provides an outline of a program for establishing a Christian theocracy. He envisions a society in which civil governance is directly guided by biblical principles and underpinned by a Christian worldview. In this theocratic model, religious and political authority would be closely intertwined, with civil laws derived explicitly from biblical teachings.

== Reception ==
Christianity Today listed The Institutes of Biblical Law among its "Significant Books for 1973", calling it "the most impressive theological work of 1973", and "a monumental work that should give invaluable help for constructive thinking and practical conduct".

Joe Bageant suggests that if the United States experiences a fourth "Great Awakening", historians may one day "document it as beginning in 1973 with the publication of R. J. Rushdoony's seminal The Institutes of Biblical Law."
