= R. J. Rushdoony =

American philosopher and theologian (1916–2001)

- Rushdoony during an interview
- Born: Rousas John Rushdoony; April 25, 1916; New York City, U.S.
- Died: February 8, 2001 (aged 84); Vallecito, California, U.S.
- Occupations: Author; Minister; missionary; founder of the Chalcedon Foundation; Rutherford Institute board member
- Notable work: The Institutes of Biblical Law, Chalcedon Report, Journal of Christian Reconstruction
- Spouse(s): Arda Gent Rushdoony (m. 1943, div. 1959, d. 1977); Dorothy Barbara Ross Kirkwood Rushdoony (m. 1962, d. 2003)
- Children: 6
- Theological work
- Language: English
- Tradition or movement: Christian philosophy
- Main interests: Calvinism, cognitive metaphysics, epistemology, philosophy of education, philosophy of politics, psychology of religion, predestination, presuppositionalism
- Notable ideas: Christian Reconstructionism, Christian homeschool

Rousas John Rushdoony (April 25, 1916 – February 8, 2001) was an American Calvinist philosopher, historian, and theologian. He is credited as being the father of Christian Reconstructionism and an inspiration for the modern Christian homeschool movement. His followers and critics have argued that his thought exerts considerable influence on the evangelical Christian right.

Rushdoony was born in 1916 in New York City to Armenian immigrants who fled the Armenian genocide. His father was a Presbyterian minister, and Rushdoony said that his family had produced a priest or minister in every generation since the fourth century. The family belonged to the Armenian Apostolic Church before converting to Presbyterianism. He learned English at school while Armenian was spoken at home. He earned a B.A. in English and an M.A. in education from UC Berkeley, attended the Pacific School of Religion, and was ordained in 1944.

Rushdoony and his first wife Arda served as missionaries to the Shoshone and Paiute on the Duck Valley Indian Reservation, during which time he began writing extensively. After returning to California, he became involved in the Christian libertarian movement, contributing to publications critical of centralized government and public welfare programs. His ministry continued in Santa Cruz, where he helped form a new Orthodox Presbyterian congregation, and later he founded the Chalcedon Foundation in Los Angeles in 1965. Through Chalcedon and his collaborations with figures like Gary North, he promoted Christian Reconstructionism, emphasizing the application of biblical law to society and education while critiquing secularism and modern democratic principles.

Rushdoony's theological and philosophical work extended across education, history, and politics, promoting a Calvinist worldview that emphasized human dependence on God and the application of Old Testament law to modern society. He was a major advocate for homeschooling and argued that American history and governance were rooted in Christian principles. His ideas have been highly controversial, drawing criticism for his support of harsh penal sanctions, his views on race and slavery, and his Holocaust-related claims.

== Biography ==
Rousas John Rushdoony was born in New York City, the son of recently arrived Ottoman Armenian immigrants Vartanoush (née Gazarian) and Yegheazar Khachig Rushdoony. Before his parents fled the Armenian genocide of 1915, his ancestors had lived in a remote area near Mount Ararat in what is now Turkey. According to Rushdoony, every generation of his family since the early fourth century had produced a Christian priest or minister, a line dated in some accounts to the year 320 AD. He described the practice as a hereditary priesthood, saying that his ancestors "would perpetually give a member of their family to be a priest to perform a kind of Aaronic priesthood as in the Old Testament, an hereditary priesthood. Whoever in the family felt called would become the priest. And our family did so. So from the early 300's until now there has always been someone in the ministry in the family."

Within weeks of arriving in America, his parents moved to the small farming community of Kingsburg, California, in Fresno County, where a number of other Armenian families had relocated. They then converted from the Armenian Apostolic Church to Presbyterianism. In Kingsburg, his father Yegheazar founded a church, Armenian Martyrs Presbyterian. Rousas later recalled: "By the time I reached my teens I had read the Bible through from cover to cover, over and over and over again."

The family moved in 1925 for a short time to Detroit, Michigan, where his father pastored another Armenian church. They returned to Kingsburg in 1931, and Rousas completed school in California. His father was the pastor of Bethel Armenian Presbyterian Church in San Francisco in 1942. Rousas had a younger sister, Rose (named after their mother), and a brother, Haig. His father died in Fresno in 1961.

=== Education ===
Rushdoony attended public schools, where he learned English, but Armenian was the language spoken at home. He continued his education at the University of California, Berkeley, where he earned a B.A. in English in 1938, a teaching credential in 1939, and an M.A. in Education in 1940. Rushdoony and Arda Gent married in San Francisco the week before Christmas 1943.

Rushdoony attended the Pacific School of Religion, a Congregationalist and Methodist seminary in Berkeley, California, from which he graduated in 1944. He corresponded for many years with his mentor at the school, the theology professor George Huntston Williams. In 1944, he was ordained by the Presbyterian Church in the United States of America.

He was later awarded an honorary Ph.D. from Valley Christian University for his book, The Philosophy of the Christian Curriculum. Gary North stated that Rushdoony read at least one book a day, six days a week, for fifty years of his life, underlining sentences and making an index of its main ideas in the rear.

=== Ministry ===
Rushdoony and his wife Arda served for eight and a half years as missionaries to the Shoshone and Paiute Indians on the remote Duck Valley Indian Reservation in northern Nevada. They lived in the reservation's primary town, Owyhee. It was during their mission to the Native Americans that Rushdoony began writing.

Arda taught at the reservation school and Sunday school, led a Girl Scout troop, coached the girls' basketball team, and visited with families. In 1945, they adopted Ronald, an orphaned baby from the reservation. Between 1947 and 1952 in Owyhee, four daughters were born to them. In late 1952, Rushdoony took an American Presbyterian Church pastorate at Trinity Presbyterian Church in Santa Cruz, California, and the family left Duck Valley in January 1953. Their son Mark was born the next month in Santa Cruz.

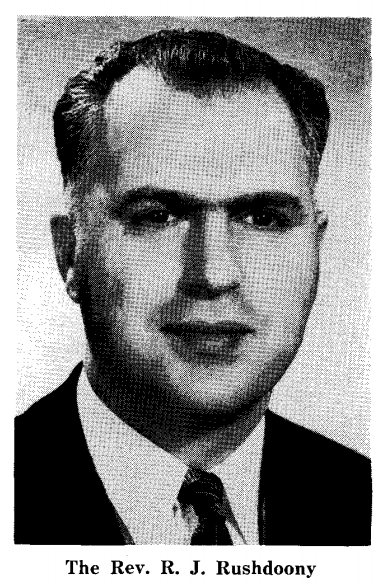
Rushdoony, c. 1958

In Santa Cruz, Rushdoony became a reader of the Christian libertarian magazine Faith and Freedom, which advocated an "anti-tax, non-interventionist, anti-statist economic model" in opposition to Franklin D. Roosevelt's New Deal. Faith and Freedom's views on government aligned with Rushdoony's fears of centralized government power, given the Rushdoony family's memories of the Armenian Genocide. Rushdoony contributed articles to Faith and Freedom, including one describing his observations of the Duck Valley Indian Reservation, arguing that government support had reduced residents to "social and personal irresponsibility".

The Rushdoonys separated in 1957 and later divorced. About this time, Rushdoony transferred his church membership from the American Presbyterian Church to the Orthodox Presbyterian denomination. The Orthodox Presbyterian Church's newsletter, The Presbyterian Guardian, reported in July 1958 that "the Rev. Rousas J. Rushdoony… was received and a new Orthodox Presbyterian Church organized, consisting of [sixty-six charter members] who had separated from the Presbyterian Church in the U.S.A. in Santa Cruz." In their petition, the group asked that Rushdoony be ordained as their pastor and stated, "[W]e cannot abide in any church which seeks to define righteousness or sin, salvation or sanctification, except in terms of the Word of God. We have witnessed, here in Santa Cruz, against modernism, man-made perfectionism, and church bureaucracy". The newsletter article goes on to report, "The Presbytery in receiving the church also examined Mr. Thomas Kirkwood and Mr. Kenneth Webb as prospective elders, and they with Mr. Rushdoony were constituted the session of the church," and announced the publication of Rushdoony's By What Standard? later that year.

=== Later life ===
The May 1962 edition of The Presbyterian Guardian reported Rushdoony's resignation, noted as "reportedly to devote his time for his writing and lecturing." Rushdoony married his second wife, Dorothy Barbara Ross Kirkwood, in 1962. She died in 2003.

Rushdoony moved to Los Angeles in 1965 and founded the Chalcedon Foundation; the monthly Chalcedon Report, which Rushdoony edited, began appearing that October. His daughter Sharon later married Gary North, a Christian Reconstructionist writer and economic historian. North and Rushdoony became collaborators, and their partnership lasted until 1981 when it ended due to a dispute over the content of one of North's articles. Following the dispute, North and Chalcedon continued to promote each other's views independently, but they did not reach a "truce" until 1995.

Under Rushdoony, the Chalcedon Foundation grew to twelve staff members with 25,000–40,000 people on their mailing lists during the 1980s. Chalcedon and Reconstructionism obtained the support of major Christian book publishers and endorsements from influential evangelical leaders, including Pat Robertson, Jerry Falwell, and Frank Schaeffer (who later repudiated the movement).

Rushdoony died in 2001 with his children at his side. Rushdoony's son, Mark R. Rushdoony, became and remains the president of the Chalcedon Foundation and editor of the Chalcedon Report.

== Philosophical and theological contributions ==
Michael J. McVicar summarized Rushdoony's theology and philosophy as follows:

As a theologian Rushdoony saw human beings as primarily religious creatures bound to God, not as rational autonomous thinkers. While this may seem an esoteric theological point, it isn't. All of Rushdoony's influence on the Christian Right stems from this single, essential fact. Many critics of Christian Reconstructionism assume that Rushdoony's unique contribution to the Christian Right was his focus on theocracy. In fact, Rushdoony's primary innovation was his single-minded effort to popularize a pre-Enlightenment, medieval view of a God-centered world. By de-emphasizing humanity's ability to reason independently of God, Rushdoony attacked the assumptions most of us uncritically accept.

Rushdoony developed his philosophy as an extension of the work of Calvinist philosopher Cornelius Van Til. Van Til critiqued human knowledge in light of the Calvinist doctrine of total depravity. He argued that sin affected a person's ability to reason. In order to be rational, Van Til claimed, one must presuppose the existence of God and the inerrant, divine inspiration of the (Protestant) Bible. Rushdoony attended to the implications – where Van Til held true knowledge came from God, Rushdoony asserted that "all non-Christian knowledge is sinful, invalid nonsense. The only valid knowledge that non-Christians possess is 'stolen' from 'Christian-theistic' sources." In effect, Rushdoony extended Van Til's thinking from philosophy to "all of life and thought."

=== Early writings ===
Rushdoony began to promote the works of Calvinist philosophers Cornelius Van Til and Herman Dooyeweerd into a short survey of contemporary humanism called By What Standard?. Arguing for a Calvinist system of thought, Rushdoony dealt with subjects as broad as epistemology and cognitive metaphysics and as narrow as the psychology of religion and predestination. He wrote a book, The One And The Many: Studies in the Philosophy of Order and Ultimacy, using Van Tillian presuppositional philosophy to critique various aspects of secular humanism. He also wrote many essays and book reviews, published in such venues as the Westminster Theological Journal.

=== Homeschooling ===
Rushdoony also wrote extensively on education, and advocated homeschooling as a way to combat what he described as the intentionally secular nature of the U.S. public school system. By the early 1980s, he was active in the homeschooling movement, appearing as an expert witness in support of homeschooling parents in legal cases. He criticized progressive school reformers such as Horace Mann and John Dewey and argued for the dismantling of the state's influence on education in three works: Intellectual Schizophrenia (a general and concise study of education), The Messianic Character of American Education (a history and castigation of public education in the U.S.), and The Philosophy of the Christian Curriculum (a parent-oriented pedagogical statement).

=== History ===
Rushdoony then pursued history – of the world, of the United States, and of the church. He maintained that Calvinistic Christianity provided the intellectual roots for the American Revolution and thus had always had an influential impact in American history. The American Revolution, according to Rushdoony, was a "conservative counterrevolution" to preserve American liberties from British usurpation and it owed nothing to the Enlightenment. He further argued that the United States Constitution was a secular document in appearance only and did not need to establish Christianity as an official religion since the states were already Christian establishments. Drawing on the work of theologian Robert Lewis Dabney, Rushdoony argued that the American Civil War "destroyed the early American Republic, which he envisioned as a decentralized Protestant feudal system and an orthodox Christian nation." Rushdoony saw the North's victory as a "defeat for Christian orthodoxy." Some historians have argued that this aspect of Rushdoony's thought influenced some activists in the Neo-Confederate movement and Southern conservatives such as J. Steven Wilkins. He would further this study in his works on American ideology and historiography, This Independent Republic: Studies in the Nature and Meaning of American History and The Nature of the American System.

On the matter of Israel's place in history, he believed that the prophet Daniel "makes clear that God by-passed His chosen people in favor of four great monarchies...and then called forth a Fifth Monarchy which is by no means identified with Israel".

=== Christian Reconstruction ===
Rushdoony wrote at length on law and politics, in his small book of popular essays Law & Liberty and in much greater detail in his three-volume, 1,894-page The Institutes of Biblical Law. Its title was modeled after Calvin's Institutes of the Christian Religion. In the book, he proposed that Old Testament law should be applied to modern society and that there should be a Christian theonomy, a concept developed in his colleague Greg Bahnsen's controversial book Theonomy in Christian Ethics, which Rushdoony endorsed. In the Institutes, Rushdoony supported the reinstatement of the Mosaic law's penal sanctions. Under such a system, the list of civil crimes which carried a death sentence would include homosexuality, adultery, incest, lying about one's virginity, bestiality, witchcraft, idolatry or apostasy, public blasphemy, false prophesying, kidnapping, rape, and bearing false witness in a capital case. Although he supported the separation of church and state at the national level, Rushdoony also believed that both institutions were under the rule of God, and he argued that secularism posed false dichotomies between them. He called for the reconstruction of society on Christian principles. The book was critical of democracy. He wrote that "the heresy of democracy has since then worked havoc in church and state ... Christianity and democracy are inevitably enemies" because democracy asserts the will of man over the will of God. According to Frank Schaeffer, who knew Rushdoony, Rushdoony supported the re-institution of the slave trade, corporal punishment for children, burning people at the stake and public executions.

Rushdoony believed that a republic is a better form of civil government than a democracy. According to Rushdoony, a republic avoided mob rule and the rule of the "51%" of society; in other words "might does not make right" in a republic. Rushdoony wrote that America's separation of powers between three branches of government is a far more neutral and better method of civil government than a direct democracy, stating "[t]he [American] Constitution was designed to perpetuate a Christian order". Rushdoony argues that the Constitution's purpose was to protect religion from the federal government and to preserve "states' rights."

Rushdoony's work has been used by Dominion theology advocates who attempt to implement a Christian government subject to Biblical law in the United States. Authority, behavioral boundaries, economics, penology and the like would all be governed by biblical principles in Rushdoony's vision. He also advocated extensive economic freedom, cited Ludwig von Mises as an intellectual influence, and described himself as a Christian libertarian.

Rushdoony was the founder in 1965 of the Chalcedon Foundation and the editor of its monthly magazine, the Chalcedon Report. He also published the Journal of Christian Reconstruction and was an early board member of the Rutherford Institute, founded in 1982 by John W. Whitehead.

In 1972, Cornelius Van Til "disclaimed affiliation" with Rushdoony and the Christian Reconstructionist movement, writing "...I am frankly a little concerned about the political views of Mr. Rushdoony and Mr. North and particularly if I am correctly informed about some of the views Gary North has with respect to the application of Old Testament principles to our day. My only point is that I would hope and expect they would not claim such views are inherent in the principles I hold".

== Criticism ==
Rushdoony was, and remains, a controversial figure, as is the Christian Reconstructionist movement in which he was involved. Pointing to Rushdoony's support for the death penalty, the British Centre for Science Education decried his perceived dislike of democracy and tolerance. Furthermore, Rushdoony has been accused of Holocaust denial and racism.

According to Frank Schaeffer, Rushdoony believed that interracial marriage, which he referred to as "unequal yoking", should be made illegal; however, his son Mark R. Rushdoony stated that his father R. J. Rushdoony officiated at weddings between European American and African American couples, teaching that "I cannot forbid what God has not!" What R. J. Rushdoony actually thought was imprudent, according to his son Mark R. Rushdoony, were marriages in which there were significant cultural differences such as those between non-Christian war brides from Japan and American soldiers who, in Rushdoony's view, little understood one another; in his own life, the father of the first woman whom R. J. Rushdoony courted rejected Rushdoony's proposal citing cultural differences between her Swedish background and Rushdoony's Armenian background. Mark R. Rushdoony stated that R. J. Rushdoony's views "did not reflect on any race but on what could potentially create an unequal yoke" and asserted his own father's view that "Man ... cannot treat his fellow-men or any part of creation with contempt."

He also opposed "enforced integration", referred to Southern slavery as "benevolent", and said that "some people are by nature slaves". Kerwin Lee Klein, however, argues that Rushdoony was not a "biological racialist" and that for him "racism founded on modern biology simply represented another pagan revival."

In The Institutes of Biblical Law, he uses the 1967 work Judaism and the Vatican by Léon de Poncins as a source for Paul Rassinier's figure of 1.2 million Jewish deaths during the Holocaust, and the claim that Raul Hilberg calculated the number at 896,292, and further asserts that very many of these died of epidemics. He called the charge of 6 million Jewish deaths "false witness" against Germany. In 2000, Rushdoony stated concerning this passage in his Institutes: "It was not my purpose to enter a debate over numbers, whether millions were killed, or tens of millions, an area which must be left to others with expertise in such matters. My point then and now is that in all such matters what the Ninth Commandment requires is the truth, not exaggeration, irrespective of the cause one seeks to serve." Carl R. Trueman, Professor of Historical Theology and Church History at Westminster Theological Seminary wrote in 2009 regarding the passage and Rushdoony's Holocaust denial:

His sources are atrocious, secondhand, and unverified; that he held this position speaks volumes about his appalling incompetence as a historian, and one can only speculate as to why he held the position from a moral perspective… He deals with the matter under the issue of the ninth commandment and, ironically breaches it himself in his presentation of the matter.

Joe Boot, on the other hand, rejects Trueman's claim, arguing that Rushdoony's "sole point was to say that our society has become so desensitized to violence, brutality, and cruelty that citing murders in small numbers doesn't have the same psychological impact upon people anymore."

Murray Rothbard, a prominent figure in the American libertarian movement, disputed Rushdoony's claim of being a libertarian in a scathing book review of Rushdoony's Intellectual Schizophrenia.

== Selected works ==
- —. The Institutes of Biblical Law.
- — (1959). By What Standard?: An Analysis of the Philosophy of Cornelius Van Til. Presbyterian and Reformed Pub. Co.
- —; Opitz, Edmund A. (1961). Intellectual Schizophrenia: Culture, Crisis, and Education. Philadelphia: Presbyterian and Reformed Pub. Co.
- — (1963). The Messianic Character of American Education. Nutley, NJ: Craig Press. Archived from the original on January 8, 2017.
- — (1964). This Independent Republic: Studies in the Nature and Meaning of American History. Nutley, NJ: Craig Press.
- — (1965). The Nature of the American System. Nutley, NJ: Craig Press.
- — (1967). The Mythology of Science. Nutley, NJ: Craig Press.
- — (1968). The Foundations of Social Order: Studies in the Creeds and Councils of the Early Church. Nutley, NJ: Presbyterian and Reformed Pub. Co.
- — (1969). The Biblical Philosophy of History. Nutley, NJ: Presbyterian and Reformed Pub. Co.
- — (1970). Thy Kingdom Come. Fairfax, VA: Thoburn Press.
- — (1970). Politics of Guilt & Pity. Nutley, NJ: Craig Press.
- — (1971). The One And The Many: Studies in The Philosophy of Order and Ultimacy. Nutley, NJ: Craig Press.
- — (1975). The Word of Flux. Fairfax, VA: Thoburn Press. Archived from the original on December 21, 2016.
- — (1977). God's Plan for Victory. Fairfax, VA: Thoburn Press.
- — (1981). The Philosophy of the Christian Curriculum (reprint ed.). Ross House Books. ISBN 9789991974613.
- — (1984). Law & Liberty. Vallecito, California: Ross House Books.
- — (1986). Christianity and the State. Vallecito, California: Ross House Books.
- — (1991). The Roots of Reconstruction. Vallecito, California: Ross House Books.
