= Gary North (economist) =

American historian and author (1942–2022)

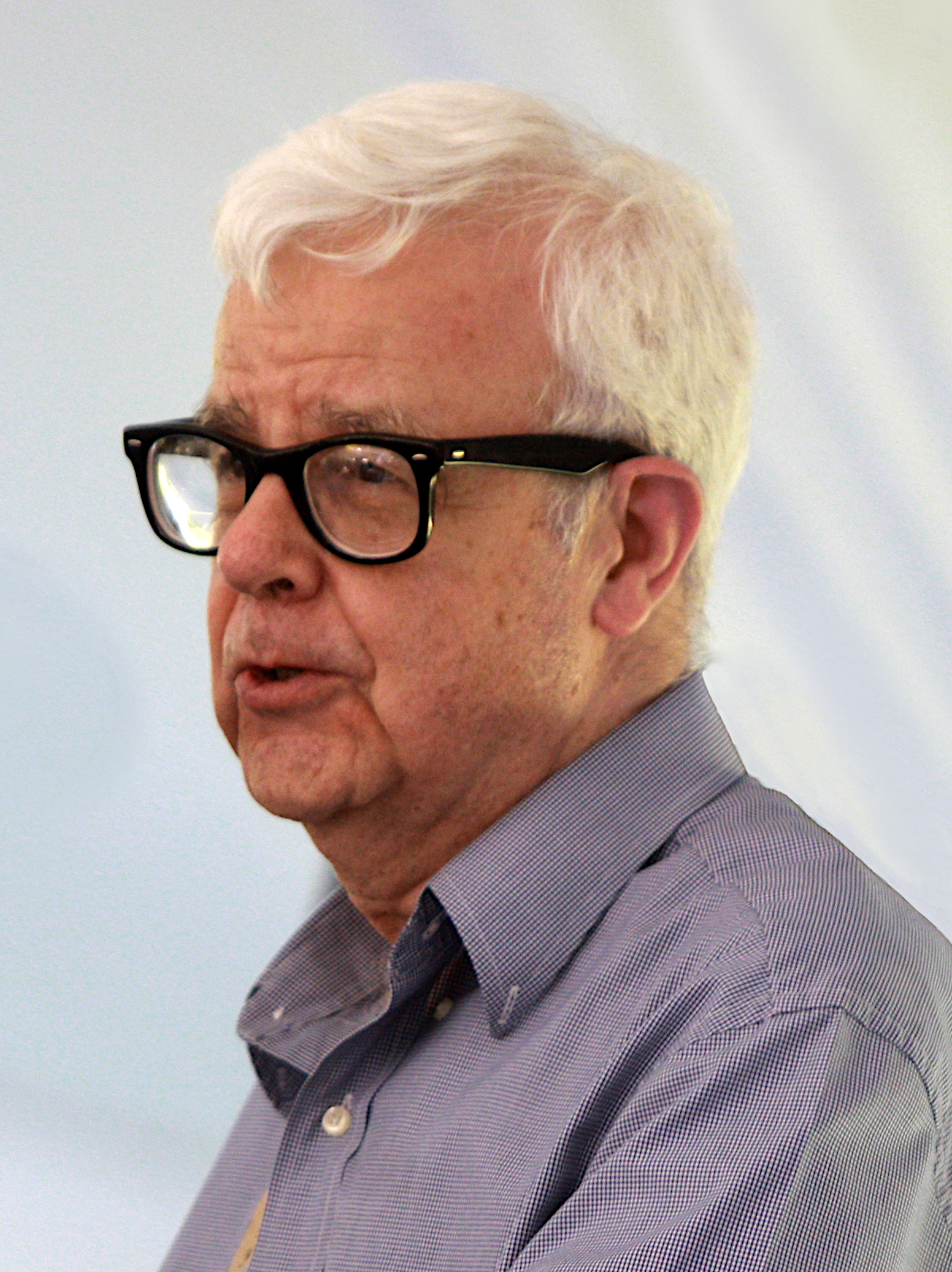
- North speaking in 2013
- Born: Gary Kilgore North; February 11, 1942; Los Angeles, California, U.S.
- Died: February 24, 2022 (aged 80); Dallas, Georgia, U.S.
- Education: University of California, Riverside (PhD)
- Occupations: Christian social theorist, economist, blogger, author
- Known for: Cofounder of Christian reconstructionism
- Spouse: Sharon Rushdoony
- Website: www.garynorth.com

Gary Kilgore North (February 11, 1942 – February 24, 2022) was an American writer, Austrian School economic historian, and leading figure in the Christian reconstructionist movement. North authored or coauthored over fifty books on topics including Reformed Protestant theology, economics, and history. He was an Associated Scholar of the Mises Institute.

He is known for his advocacy of biblical or "radically libertarian" economics and also as a theorist of dominionism and theonomy. North often invoked the Protestant work ethic to advance these views. He supported the establishment and enforcement of Bible-based religious law, a view which put him in conflict with other libertarians. He believed that capital punishment is appropriate punishment for male homosexuality, adultery, blasphemy, abortion, and witchcraft.

== Early life and education ==
North was born in Los Angeles, California, on February 11, 1942, and grew up in Southern California, the son of FBI special agent Samuel W. North Jr. and his wife Peggy. North converted to Christianity in high school and, after attending a rally where anti-communist activist Fred Schwarz spoke, began frequenting conservative book-stores in the Los Angeles area during his college years. Between 1961 and 1963, while an undergraduate student at University of California, Riverside, North became acquainted with the works of Wilhelm Röpke, Rose Wilder Lane, Cornelius Van Til, Austrian School economists Eugen Böhm von Bawerk, Ludwig von Mises, F. A. Hayek and Murray Rothbard, and also read the works of Calvinist philosopher Rousas John Rushdoony. Later he married Rushdoony's daughter, collaborated with him and eulogized Rushdoony in a blog post on LewRockwell.com.

== Career ==
Starting in 1967, North became a contributor to the libertarian journal The Freeman where he had first read the work of Ludwig von Mises and Friedrich Hayek. In the 1970s, he was the director of seminars for the Foundation for Economic Education (FEE). North received a PhD in history from the University of California, Riverside in 1972. His dissertation was The Concept of Property in Puritan New England, 1630–1720.

He served as research assistant for libertarian Republican Congressman Ron Paul in Paul's first term (1976). North was a regular contributor to the LewRockwell.com website, which lists an extensive archive of his articles there. North's own website, Garynorth.com, posts commentary on religious, social, and political issues and offers paid access to investment advice and other premium content. North also published a blog called Deliverance from Debt which provided advice about relief from debt. Another North website, "Free Christian Curriculum", seeks to provide a free Christian homeschooling curriculum for children from age 3 through grade 12.

=== Ron Paul curriculum ===
In addition, North contributed to the Ron Paul Curriculum, a home school online curriculum associated with former U.S. Congressman Ron Paul, which is free for grades K–5 and available to paid members from grades 6–12. As director of curriculum development, North outlined four goals of the educational project: providing a "detailed study" of the "history of liberty"; teaching a "thorough understanding of Austrian economics"; serving as "an academically rigorous curriculum that is tied to primary source" material rather than textbooks; and teaching "the Biblical principle of self-government and personal responsibility", which North called "the foundation of the market economy".

=== Christian, Bible-based economic methodology ===
North wrote that the "starting point for all economic analysis" lies in accepting that "God [has] cursed the earth" in the Book of Genesis 3:17–19; this "made scarcity an inescapable fact of man's existence". In his 1982 Dominion Covenant: Genesis, North wrote that mainstream modern economics, whether libertarian, conservative or liberal, is "in disintegration" because it is "humanist" in its approach and consequently rejects the notion that "biblical revelation" is necessary for sound economic theory. He also wrote that economics "must begin with the [Biblical] story of creation" if it is not to collapse into "total chaos".

=== Proposed "Christian theocratic" political and social order ===
A 2011 article in The New York Times identified North as a central figure in Christian reconstructionism, the philosophy which advocates the institution of "a Christian theocracy under Old Testament law [as] the best form of government, and a radically libertarian one." North wrote: "I certainly believe in biblical theocracy."

The article also described North as "the leading proponent of 'Christian economics,' which applies biblical principles to economic issues and the free market." North supported the abolition of the fractional-reserve banking system and a return to the gold standard. According to the Times, North believed that the Bible forbids inflation, welfare programs, and also writes that "God would prefer gold money to paper".

==== Range of capital offenses ====
North favored capital punishment for a range of offenders, including murderers, blasphemers, children who curse their parents, male homosexuals, and other people who commit some of the acts deemed capital offenses in the Old Testament. (North believed that the death penalty for sabbath breaking and some other crimes no longer applies.) North stated that the biblical admonition to kill homosexuals in the Book of Leviticus is God's "law and its morally appropriate sanction", arguing that "God is indeed a homophobe" who "hates the practice [of homosexuality] and those who practice it" and "hates the sin and hates the sinner."

North said that capital punishment should be carried out by stoning, because it is the biblically approved method of execution and it is cheap due to the plentiful and convenient supply of stones. For non-capital offenses, North eschewed prisons as a punishment, but preferred "whipping, restitution in the form of indentured servitude, or slavery".

==== Religious liberty ====
North said: "We must use the doctrine of religious liberty to gain independence for Christian schools until we train up a generation of people who know that there is no religious neutrality, no neutral law, no neutral education, and no neutral civil government. Then they will get busy in constructing a Bible-based social, political and religious order which finally denies the religious liberty of the enemies of God."

Adam C. English suggests that this quote implies that "religious liberty is a useful tool to Christians in the present, yet is ultimately to be denied to anyone who is not Christian once the Christians are in power". English argues that although this may seem inconsistent (advocating religious liberty but denying the reality of the notion), North and his fellow reconstructionists understand "liberty" in a theological sense. According to the reconstructionists, "anyone outside of the Christian faith is in bondage," and so "government by rigorous theonomy is not oppressive but liberating".

=== Y2K ===
North was also a prominent promoter of exaggerated predictions of computer failure from the Year 2000 problem (Y2K) during the late 1990s, earning him the nickname "Scary Gary." His main website became dominated by links to extremist predictions for Y2K damage, including widespread collapse of governments and financial institutions. North declared on his home page that Y2K "may be the biggest problem that the modern world has ever faced" and labeled 2000 as "The Year the Earth Stands Still".

Critics said the motivation for North's predictions was linked to his Christian reconstructionist aims, which require widespread societal collapse to set the stage for a new theocratic order. North made the connection explicit in communications with fellow reconstructionists: "The Y2K crisis is systemic. It cannot possibly be fixed. I think it will wipe out every national government in the West. Not just modify them—destroy them...That is what I have wanted all my adult life. In my view, Y2K is our deliverance."

== Death ==
North was diagnosed with prostate cancer in 2017, and underwent treatment for about five years. He died in Dallas, Georgia, on February 24, 2022, at the age of 80.

== Publications ==
=== Institute for Christian Economics ===
North was the founder of the Institute for Christian Economics (ICE), which publishes online books and magazines focusing on Christian ethics. ICE, along with Dominion Press in Tyler, Texas, are important sources for reconstructionist publications.

=== Books and newsletters ===
North authored or coauthored more than fifty books, many of which are available for free download. For many years, North was the author and editor of the newsletter The Remnant Review. He also provided Gary North's Reality Check, a free e-newsletter.

=== Documentary and educational film ===
- Unknown History of the 20th Century (DVD) (2006) OCLC 213272975

== See also ==
- Christian libertarianism
- Neo-Calvinism
- Paleolibertarianism
- Right-libertarianism
