= Frederick Clarkson =

American journalist

Frederick Clarkson is an American journalist and public speaker in the fields of politics and religion. He is the author of Eternal Hostility: The Struggle Between Theocracy and Democracy (1997, ISBN 1-56751-088-4); editor of Dispatches from the Religious Left: The Future of Faith and Politics in America (2008, ISBN 978-0-9788431-8-2); and co-author of Challenging the Christian Right: The Activist’s Handbook (1992) for which he and his co-author were named among the "Media Heroes of 1992" by the Institute for Alternative Journalism. They were described as "especially brave at taking on powerful institutions and persistent about getting stories out...journalists and activists who persevere in fighting censorship and protecting the First Amendment," and "understanding the Christian Right's recent strategy of stealth politics early on, and or doggedly tracking its activities across the U.S." He has also published articles with Salon.com, Ms. magazine, The Christian Science Monitor, The Public Eye, and other publications.

He is best known in recent years for breaking the story of, and his follow-up reporting on Project Blitz, a national Christian Right state legislative campaign, in the online magazine Religion Dispatches.

His notable interviews as a journalist have been with former U.S. Secretary of Labor Robert Reich in In These Times, comedy writer Jane Bussmann, Sudanese Anglican Bishop Andudu Adam Elnail, General Minister and President of the United Church of Christ John C. Dorhauer, and historian John Ragosta in Religion Dispatches.

His articles have been anthologized in such scholarly works as Encyclopedia of Millennialism and Millennial Movements, (Routledge, 2000); Harcourt Source Readings for American Government (Harcourt College Publishers, 2000); Eyes Right: Challenging the Right-wing Backlash (South End Press, 1995); Trumping Democracy in the United States: From Ronald Reagan to Alt-Right'' (Routledge, 2019); and "Exposing the Right and Fighting for Democracy Celebrating Chip Berlet as Journalist and Scholar" (Routledge, 2021). He is the editor of A Moment to Decide: The Crisis in Mainstream Presbyterianism (Institute for Democracy Studies, 2000). His work is widely cited in books by others. The progressive journalist and Southern raconteur Joe Bageant, wrote in his book Deer Hunting with Jesus: Dispatches from America's Class War, “Fred Clarkson, a New England Yankee with a streak of liberty a mile wide, has been thinking and writing about this longer than anybody I know.”

He has often been cited by major media, including such major newspapers as The New York Times, The Washington Post, The Christian Science Monitor, Los Angeles Times and The Guardian. His radio appearances include NPR's Fresh Air, Morning Edition, All Things Considered, and Talk of the Nation, Democracy Now, and State of Belief. His television interviews include CNN, Fox News, ABC's 20/20, and the CBS Evening News; as well as the BBC and the CBC. He has been interviewed in a number of films including the short 2008 documentary Renewal or Ruin? The Institute on Religion and Democracy's Attack on the United Methodist Church by independent producer Steven D. Martin; and Lake of Fire, a 2007 documentary film about abortion by Hollywood film director Tony Kaye.

He was Senior Fellow for Religious Liberty at Political Research Associates in Somerville, Massachusetts, beginning in 2012 until he became a Senior Research Analyst in 2017. He was a columnist on religious liberty for LGBTQ Nation in 2014–2015. He is the author of a major report, When Exemption is the Rule: The Religious Freedom Strategy of the Christian Right, from Political Research Associates, 2016.

He is the co-founder of Talk to Action, a group blog which features critical reports about the Religious Right.
