= Cornelius Van Til =

Dutch-American philosopher and theologian (1895–1987)

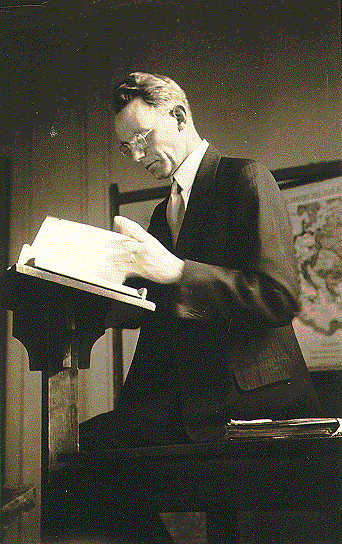
- Portrait of Van Til
- Born: May 3, 1895; Grootegast, Groningen, Netherlands
- Died: April 17, 1987 (aged 91); Philadelphia, Pennsylvania, U.S.

Philosophical work
- Era: Modern philosophy: 20th-century philosophy
- Region: Western philosophy: American philosophy; Dutch philosophy
- School: Presuppositionalism
- Main interests: Epistemology, Christian apologetics, philosophy of religion, systematic theology
- Notable ideas: Transcendental argument

Ecclesiastical career
- Religion: Christianity (Protestant)
- Church: CRCNA (1927–1928); PCUSA (1928–1936); OPC (1936–1987)

Cornelius Van Til (May 3, 1895 – April 17, 1987) was a Dutch-American Reformed theologian, who is credited as being the originator of modern presuppositional apologetics.

Van Til was born in Groningen, Netherlands, and moved to the United States in his youth. He graduated from Calvin College and received his PhD from Princeton University, where he taught before co-founding and teaching at Westminster Theological Seminary until his retirement. Van Til and his work heavily influenced Christian reconstructionist theologians like Greg Bahnsen and R. J. Rushdoony.

== Biography ==
Van Til (born Kornelis van Til in Grootegast, Netherlands) was the sixth son of Ite van Til, a dairy farmer, and his wife Klasina van der Veen. At the age of ten, he moved with his family to Highland, Indiana. He was the first of his family to receive a higher education. In 1914 he attended Calvin Preparatory School, graduated from Calvin College, and attended one year at Calvin Theological Seminary, where he studied under Louis Berkhof. However, he transferred to Princeton Theological Seminary and later graduated with his PhD from Princeton University.

He began teaching at Princeton Seminary, but shortly went with the conservative group that founded Westminster Theological Seminary, where he taught for forty-three years. He taught apologetics and systematic theology there until his retirement in 1972 and continued to teach occasionally until 1979. He was also a minister in the Christian Reformed Church in North America and in the Orthodox Presbyterian Church from the 1930s until his death in 1987, and in that denomination, he was embroiled in a bitter dispute with Gordon Clark over God's incomprehensibility known as the Clark–Van Til Controversy.

== Work ==
Van Til drew upon the works of Dutch Calvinist philosophers such as D. H. Th. Vollenhoven, Herman Dooyeweerd, and Hendrik G. Stoker and theologians such as Herman Bavinck and Abraham Kuyper to devise a novel Reformed approach to Christian apologetics, one that opposed the traditional methodology of reasoning on the supposition that there is a neutral middle-ground, upon which the non-Christian and the Christian can agree. His contribution to the Neo-Calvinist approach of Dooyeweerd, Stoker and others, was to insist that the "ground motive" of a Christian philosophy must be derived from the historical terms of the Christian faith. In particular, he argued that the Trinity is of indispensable and insuperable value to a Christian philosophy.

In Van Til: The Theologian, John Frame, a sympathetic critic of Van Til, stated that Van Til's contributions to Christian thought are comparable in magnitude to those of Immanuel Kant in non-Christian philosophy. He indicates that Van Til identified the disciplines of systematic theology and apologetics, seeing the former as a positive statement of the Christian faith and the latter as a defense of that statement – "a difference in emphasis rather than of subject matter." Frame summarizes Van Til's legacy as one of new applications of traditional doctrines:

Unoriginal as his doctrinal formulations may be, his use of those formulations – his application of them – is often quite remarkable. The sovereignty of God becomes an epistemological, as well as a religious and metaphysical principle. The Trinity becomes the answer to the philosophical problem of the one and the many. Common grace becomes the key to a Christian philosophy of history. These new applications of familiar doctrines inevitably increase [Christians'] understanding of the doctrines themselves, for [they] come thereby to a new appreciation of what these doctrines demand of [them].

Similarly, Van Til's application of the doctrines of total depravity and the ultimate authority of God led to his reforming of the discipline of apologetics. Specifically, he denied neutrality on the basis of the total depravity of man and the invasive effects of sin on man's reasoning ability and he insisted that the Bible, which he viewed as a divinely inspired book, be trusted preeminently because he believed the Christian's ultimate commitment must rest on the ultimate authority of God. As Frame says elsewhere, "the foundation of Van Til's system and its most persuasive principle" is a rejection of autonomy since "Christian thinking, like all of the Christian life, is subject to God's lordship". However, it is this very feature that has caused some Christian apologists to reject Van Til's approach. For instance, D. R. Trethewie describes Van Til's system as nothing more than "a priori dogmatic transcendental irrationalism, which he has attempted to give a Christian name to."

=== Kuyper–Warfield synthesis ===
It is claimed that Fideism describes the view of fellow Dutchman Abraham Kuyper, whom Van Til cited as a major inspiration. Van Til is seen as taking the side of Kuyper against his alma mater, Princeton Seminary, and particularly against Princeton professor B. B. Warfield. But Van Til described his approach to apologetics as a synthesis of these two approaches: "I have tried to use elements both of Kuyper's and of Warfield's thinking." Greg Bahnsen, a student of Van Til and one of his most prominent defenders and expositors, wrote that "A person who can explain the ways in which Van Til agreed and disagreed with both Warfield and Kuyper, is a person who understands presuppositional apologetics."

With Kuyper, Van Til believed that the Christian and the non-Christian have different ultimate standards, presuppositions that color the interpretation of every fact in every area of life. But with Warfield, he believed that a rational proof for Christianity is possible: "Positively Hodge and Warfield were quite right in stressing the fact that Christianity meets every legitimate demand of reason. Surely Christianity is not irrational. To be sure, it must be accepted on faith, but surely it must not be taken on blind faith. Christianity is capable of rational defense." And like Warfield, Van Til believed that the Holy Spirit will use arguments against unbelief as a means to convert non-believers.

Van Til sought a third way from Kuyper and Warfield. His answer to the question "How do you argue with someone who has different presuppositions?" is the transcendental argument, an argument that seeks to prove that certain presuppositions are necessary for the possibility of rationality. The Christian and non-Christian have different presuppositions, but, according to Van Til, only the Christian's presuppositions allow for the possibility of human rationality or intelligible experience. By rejecting an absolutely rational God that determines whatsoever comes to pass and presupposing that some non-rational force ultimately determines the nature of the universe, the non-Christian cannot account for rationality. Van Til claims that non-Christian presuppositions reduce to absurdity and are self-defeating. Thus, non-Christians can reason, but they are being inconsistent with their presuppositions when they do so. The unbeliever's ability to reason is based on the fact that, despite what he believes, he is God's creature living in God's world.

Hence, Van Til arrives at his famous assertion that there is no neutral common ground between Christians and non-Christians because their presuppositions, their ultimate principles of interpretation, are different; but because non-Christians act and think inconsistently with regard to their presuppositions, common ground can be found. The task of the Christian apologist is to point out the difference in ultimate principles, and then show why the non-Christian's reduce to absurdity.

=== Transcendental argument ===
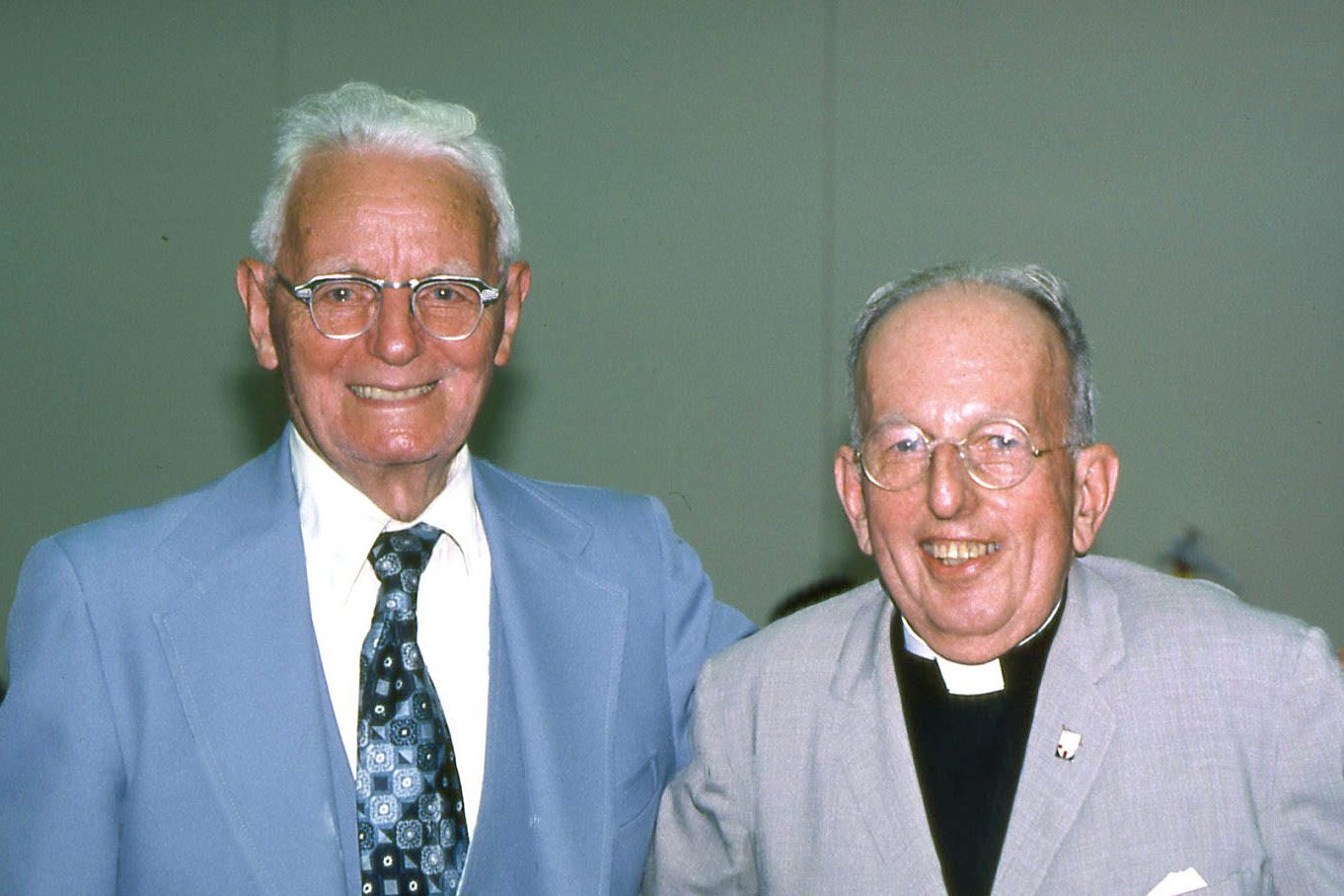
Van Til (left) pictured with Robert Knight Rudolph in 1981.

The substance of Van Til's transcendental argument is that the doctrine of the ontological Trinity, which is concerned with the reciprocal relationships of the persons of the Godhead to each other without reference to God's relationship with creation, is the aspect of God's character that is necessary for the possibility of rationality. R. J. Rushdoony writes, "The whole body of Van Til's writings is given to the development of this concept of the ontological Trinity and its philosophical implications." The ontological Trinity is important to Van Til because he can relate it to the philosophical concept of the "concrete universal" and the problem of the one and the many.

For Van Til, the ontological Trinity means that God's unity and diversity are equally basic. This is in contrast to non-Christian philosophy in which unity and diversity are seen as ultimately separate from each other:

The whole problem of knowledge has constantly been that of bringing the one and the many together. When man looks about him and within him, he sees that there is a great variety of facts. The question that comes up at once is whether there is any unity in this variety, whether there is one principle in accordance with which all these many things appear and occur. All non-Christian thought, if it has utilized the idea of a supra-mundane existence at all, has used this supra-mundane existence as furnishing only the unity or the a priori aspect of knowledge, while it has maintained that the a posteriori aspect of knowledge is something that is furnished by the universe.

Pure unity with no particularity is a blank, and pure particularity with no unity is chaos. Frame says that a blank and chaos are "meaningless in themselves and impossible to relate to one another. As such, unbelieving worldviews always reduce to unintelligible nonsense. This is, essentially, Van Til's critique of secular philosophy (and its influence on Christian philosophy)."

=== Karl Barth ===
Van Til was also a strident opponent of the theology of Karl Barth, and his opposition led to the rejection of Barth's theology by many in the Calvinist community. Despite Barth's assertions that he sought to base his theology solely on the 'Word of God', Van Til believed that Barth's thought was syncretic in nature and fundamentally flawed because, according to Van Til, it assumed a Kantian epistemology, which Van Til argued was necessarily irrational and anti-Biblical.

Van Til lays out his case against Barthianism and Neo-orthodoxy in The New Modernism: An Appraisal of the Theology of Barth and Brunner (1946), Christianity and Barthianism (1962), and Karl Barth and Evangelicalism (1964).

== Influence ==
Many recent theologians have been influenced by Van Til's thought, including John Frame, Greg Bahnsen, Rousas John Rushdoony, Francis Schaeffer, as well as many of the current faculty members of Westminster Theological Seminary, Reformed Theological Seminary, and other Calvinist seminaries. He was also the personal mentor of K. Scott Oliphint late in life.

== Bibliography ==
Some of Van Til's writings (ranked in order of importance by K. Scott Oliphint) include:

- A Survey of Christian Epistemology (In Defense of the Faith, vol. II; available online for free) ISBN 0-87552-495-8
- An Introduction to Systematic Theology (In Defense of the Faith, vol. V) ISBN 0-87552-488-5
- Common Grace and the Gospel ISBN 0-87552-482-6
- A Christian Theory of Knowledge ISBN 0-87552-480-X
- The Defense of the Faith ISBN 0-87552-483-4
- The Reformed Pastor and Modern Thought ISBN 0-87552-497-4
- Christian-Theistic Evidences (In Defense of the Faith, vol. VI), Phillipsburg, N.J.: Presbyterian and Reformed Publishing Co., 1978
- The Doctrine of Scripture (In Defense of the Faith, vol. I), Copyright denDulk Christian Foundation, 1967
- The Sovereignty of Grace: An Appraisal of G.C. Berkouwer's View of Dordt, Nutley, N.J.: Presbyterian and Reformed Publishing Co., 1975
- The New Synthesis Theology of the Netherlands, Nutley, N.J.: Presbyterian and Reformed Publishing Co., 1976
- The Case for Calvinism ISBN 0-87552-476-1
- Essays on Christian Education ISBN 0-87552-485-0
- Psychology of Religion (In Defense of the Faith, vol. IV) ISBN 0-87552-494-X
- The New Hermeneutic ISBN 1-112-86264-1
- The Intellectual Challenge of the Gospel (pamphlet) ISBN 0-87552-487-7
- Why I Believe in God (pamphlet; available online for free), Philadelphia, Pa.: Westminster Theological Seminary, no date
- Paul at Athens (pamphlet), Phillipsburg, N.J.: Presbyterian and Reformed Publishing Co., 1978
- Karl Barth and Evangelicalism (pamphlet), Nutley, N.J.: Presbyterian and Reformed Publishing Co., 1964

Additionally, Eric Sigward has edited The Works of Cornelius Van Til, 1895-1987, CD-ROM (ISBN 0-87552-461-3), a comprehensive collection of Van Til's writings in digital form that also includes images and extensive audio recordings of Van Til. Today this collection is available for the Logos Bible Software.

A final critique of Karl Barth's theology is Van Til's work, Christianity and Barthianism (1962), adding to his previous work, The New Modernism: An Appraisal of the Theology of Barth and Brunner (1946).

== Sources ==
- Bahnsen, Greg (1998). Van Til's Apologetic: Readings and Analysis. P&R Publishing. ISBN 0-87552-098-7.
- Frame, John (1976). Van Til the Theologian. Phillipsburg, NJ: Pilgrim Publishing Co. ISBN 0-916034-02-X. Archived from the original on October 12, 2004.
- Frame, John (1995). Cornelius Van Til: An Analysis of His Thought. P&R Publishing. ISBN 978-0-87552-245-6.
- Geehan, E.R., ed. (1971). Jerusalem & Athens: Critical Discussions on the Philosophy and Apologetics of Cornelius Van Til - a Festschrift. Presbyterian and Reformed. ISBN 0-87552-489-3.
- Halsey, Jim S. (1976). For a Time Such as This: An Introduction to the Reformed Apologetics of Cornelius Van Til. Philadelphia: Presbyterian and Reformed.
- Notaro, Thom (1980). Van Til and the Use of Evidence. Presbyterian and Reformed. ISBN 978-0-87552-353-8.
- Rushdoony, Rousas John (2003) [1959, Philadelphia: Presbyterian and Reformed]. By what standard? An analysis of the philosophy of Cornelius Van Til. Chalcedon. ISBN 1-879998-05-X.
- White, William jr. (1979). Van Til, defender of the faith: An authorized biography. T. Nelson Publishers. ISBN 0-8407-5670-4.
