= Dominion theology =

Ideology seeking Christian rule

Dominion theology, also known as dominionism, is a group of Protestant political ideologies that seek to institute a nation governed by Christians based on their understandings of biblical law. Prominent adherents of those ideologies include Calvinist Christian reconstructionism, Charismatic and Pentecostal Kingdom Now theology, and the New Apostolic Reformation. Extents of rule and ways of acquiring governing authority are varied. For example, dominion theology can include theonomy but does not necessarily involve advocacy of adherence to the Mosaic Law as the basis of government. The label is primarily applied to groups of Christians in the United States.

Most of the contemporary movements that are labeled dominion theology arose in the 1970s from religious movements asserting aspects of Christian nationalism. Integralism is also sometimes considered to fall under the dominionist umbrella, but the Catholic integralist movement is much older and theologically markedly different from Protestant dominionism since it is tied to the doctrine that the Catholic Church is the only true church.

== Etymology ==
Dominion theology is a reference to the King James Bible's rendering of Genesis 1:28 in which God grants humanity "dominion" over the Earth.

And God blessed them, and God said unto them, "Be fruitful, and multiply, and replenish the earth, and subdue it: and have dominion over the fish of the sea, and over the fowl of the air, and over every living thing that moveth upon the earth."

In the late 1980s, several prominent Evangelical authors used the phrase dominion theology and other terms such as dominionism to label a loose grouping of theological movements that made direct appeals to the passage in Genesis. Christians typically interpret the passage as meaning that God gave mankind responsibility over the Earth, but one of the most distinctive aspects of dominion theology is that it is interpreted as a mandate for Christian stewardship in civil affairs, no less than in other human matters.

== Types ==
=== Christian reconstructionism ===
An example of dominionism in Reformed theology is Christian reconstructionism, which originated in the teachings of R. J. Rushdoony in the 1960s and the 1970s. His theology focuses on theonomy, the rule of the Law of God, and his belief that all of society should be ordered according to the laws that governed the Israelites in the Old Testament. His ideas on biblical law in civil government are laid out most comprehensively in The Institutes of Biblical Law, but he wrote many other books dealing with the subject. Rushdoony's proposed system is strongly Calvinistic by emphasizing the sovereignty of God over human freedom and action, and denying the operation of charismatic gifts in the present day (cessationism). Both of those aspects are in direct opposition to Kingdom Now theology.

Full adherents to reconstructionism are few and marginalized among most Christians. Dave Hunt, Albert James Dager, Hal Lindsey, and Thomas Ice specifically criticize Christian reconstructionism from a Christian viewpoint and disagree on theological grounds with its theocratic elements as well as its Calvinism and postmillennialism. J. Ligon Duncan, Sherman Isbell, Vern Poythress, Robert Godfrey, and Sinclair Ferguson analyze reconstructionism as conservative Calvinists, primarily giving a theological critique of its theocratic elements. Michael J. McVicar has noted that many leading Christian reconstructionists are also leading writers in paleolibertarian circles.

Some social scientists have used the word dominionism to refer to adherence to Christian reconstructionism.

=== Kingdom Now theology ===
Kingdom Now theology is a branch of dominion theology that has a following within Pentecostalism and attracted attention in the late 1980s.

Kingdom Now theology states that although Satan has been in control of the world since the Fall of Man, God is looking for people who will help him take back dominion. Those who yield themselves to the authority of God's apostles and prophets will take control of the kingdoms of this world, being defined as all social institutions, the "kingdom" of education, the "kingdom" of science, the "kingdom" of the arts, etc. C. Peter Wagner, the founder of the New Apostolic Reformation, writes: "The practical theology that best builds a foundation under social transformation is dominion theology, sometimes called 'Kingdom Now'. Its history can be traced back through R. J. Rushdoony and Abraham Kuyper to John Calvin."

In 2007 Wagner stated:

Our theological bedrock is what has been known as Dominion Theology. This means that our divine mandate is to do whatever is necessary, by the power of the Holy Spirit, to retake the dominion of God's creation which Adam forfeited to Satan in the Garden of Eden. It is nothing less than seeing God's kingdom coming and His will being done here on earth as it is in heaven.

Kingdom Now theology is influenced by the Latter Rain movement, and critics have connected it to the New Apostolic Reformation, "Spiritual Warfare Christianity," and Fivefold ministry thinking.

Seven Mountains Dominionism, also known as the Seven Mountains Mandate or 7MM, has become a more prevalent manifestation of Kingdom Now theology since the early 2010s. Bill Bright, Loren Cunningham, and Francis Schaeffer are often credited as having been given the same divine vision that revealed the Seven Mountain Mandate in 1975. The mandate proposes that there are seven "mountains" that Christians must control to establish a global Christian theocracy and prepare the world for Jesus' return: government, education, media, arts and entertainment, religion, family, and business. The mandate is based on two biblical passages: Isaiah 2:2–3, which says, "In the last days the mountain of the Lord’s temple will be established as the highest of the mountains," and Revelation 17:1–18, which describes "a scarlet beast... [with] seven heads and ten horns." Prominent Christian leaders who support Seven Mountains Dominionism include David Barton, James Dobson, John Hagee, Bill Johnson, Lance Wallnau, and Paula White. Notable politicians who have embraced it include Michele Bachmann, Sam Brownback, Ted Cruz, Newt Gingrich, Mike Huckabee, Charlie Kirk, Sarah Palin, and Rick Perry.

Kingdom Now theology should not be confused with Kingdom theology, which is related to inaugurated eschatology.

=== Integralism ===
Integralism has been characterized as a form of dominionist theology, but in reality, it is much older and theologically distinct from the dominionism that is espoused by Protestants. Antonio Spadaro and Marcelo Figueroa have said that Catholic integralists have entered into a nontraditional ecumenical alliance with Protestant reconstructionists who share "the same desire for religious influence in the political sphere." Likewise, in the National Catholic Reporter, Joshua J. McElwee wrote that Catholic integralists, along with their Protestant counterparts, wish to establish a "theocratic type of state." But ultimately, the goals of Protestant dominionists and Catholic integralists are divergent, as integralists adhere to the doctrine that the Catholic Church is the "only true church" and that every form of Protestantism is "heretical." That has not prevented cooperation between them, however, when it has been mutually beneficial.

In recent years, a "revived Catholic integralism" has been noted among the younger generation of Catholics writing for websites such as The Josias. Integralism could be said to merely be the modern continuation of the traditional Catholic conception of church–state relations elucidated by Pope Gelasius I and expounded upon throughout the centuries until the Syllabus of Errors, which condemned the idea that the separation of church and state is a moral good. For example, some Catholics have praised the actions of Pius IX in the 1858 Mortara case in which he ordered the abduction of a six-year-old Jewish boy who had been baptized without his parents' consent. A systematic account of Catholic integralism as a coherent political philosophy has been written by the Catholic theologians Thomas Crean and Alan Fimister: Integralism: A Manual of Political Philosophy.

== Political activism ==
In the late 1980s, the sociologist Sara Diamond started to write about the intersection of dominion theology with the political activism of the Christian right. Diamond argued that "the primary importance of the [Christian reconstructionist] ideology is its role as a catalyst for what is loosely called 'dominion theology.'" According to Diamond, "Largely through the impact of Rushdoony's and North's writings, the concept that Christians are Biblically mandated to 'occupy' all secular institutions has become the central unifying ideology for the Christian Right" (emphasis in original) in the United States.

While acknowledging the small number of actual adherents, authors such as Diamond and Frederick Clarkson have argued that postmillennial Christian reconstructionism played a major role in pushing the primarily premillennial Christian right to adopt a more aggressive dominionist stance.

Misztal and Shupe concur with Sara Diamond and Frederick Clarkson by arguing, "Reconstructionists have many more sympathizers who fall somewhere within the dominionist framework, but who are not card-carrying members." According to Diamond, "Reconstructionism is the most intellectually grounded, though esoteric, brand of dominion theology."

The journalist Frederick Clarkson defined dominionism as a movement that includes dominion theology and reconstructionism as subsets but is much broader in scope and extends to much of the Christian right in the United States.

In his 1992 study of dominion theology and its influence on the Christian right, Bruce Barron wrote:

In the context of American evangelical efforts to penetrate and transform public life, the distinguishing mark of a dominionist is a commitment to defining and carrying out an approach to building society that is self-consciously defined as exclusively Christian, and dependent specifically on the work of Christians, rather than based on a broader consensus.

In 1995, Diamond called the influence of dominion theology "prevalent on the Christian Right."

The journalist Chip Berlet added in 1998 that although they represent different theological and political ideas, dominionists assert a Christian duty to take "control of a sinful secular society."

In 2005, Clarkson enumerated the following characteristics shared by all forms of dominionism:

1. Dominionists celebrate Christian nationalism, in that they believe that the United States once was, and should once again be, a Christian nation. In this way, they deny the Enlightenment roots of American democracy.
2. Dominionists promote religious supremacy, insofar as they generally do not respect the equality of other religions, or even other versions of Christianity.
3. Dominionists endorse theocratic visions, insofar as they believe that the Ten Commandments, or "biblical law," should be the foundation of American law, and that the U.S. Constitution should be seen as a vehicle for implementing biblical principles.

The essayist Katherine Yurica began using the term dominionism in her articles in 2004, beginning with "The Despoiling of America". Authors who also use the term dominionism in the broader sense include the journalist Chris Hedges, Marion Maddox, James Rudin, Michelle Goldberg, Kevin Phillips, Sam Harris, Ryan Lizza, Frank Schaeffer, and the group TheocracyWatch. Some authors have applied the term to a broader spectrum of people than have Diamond, Clarkson, and Berlet.

Sarah Posner in Salon argues that there are various "iterations of dominionism that call on Christians to enter... government, law, media and so forth... so that they are controlled by Christians." According to Posner, "Christian right figures promoted dominionism... and the GOP courted... religious leaders for the votes of their followers." She added: "If people really understood dominionism, they’d worry about it between election cycles."

Michelle Goldberg notes that George Grant wrote in his 1987 book The Changing of the Guard: Biblical Principles for Political Action:

Christians have an obligation, a mandate, a commission, a holy responsibility to reclaim the land for Jesus Christ—to have dominion in civil structures, just as in every other aspect of life and godliness.... But it is dominion we are after. Not just a voice.... Christian politics has as its primary intent the conquest of the land—of men, families, institutions, bureaucracies, courts, and governments for the Kingdom of Christ.

=== Spectrum of dominionism ===
Writers including Chip Berlet and Frederick Clarkson distinguish between what they term "hard" and "soft" dominionism. Such commentators define "soft" dominionism as the belief that "America is a Christian nation" and opposition to separation of church and state, but "hard" dominionism refers to dominion theology and Christian reconstructionism.

Michelle Goldberg uses the terms Christian nationalism and dominionism for the former view. According to Goldberg:

In many ways, Dominionism is more a political phenomenon than a theological one. It cuts across Christian denominations, from stern, austere sects to the signs-and-wonders culture of modern megachurches. Think of it like political Islamism, which shapes the activism of a number of antagonistic fundamentalist movements, from Sunni Wahabis in the Arab world to Shiite fundamentalists in Iran.

Berlet and Clarkson have agreed, "Soft Dominionists are Christian nationalists." Unlike dominionism, the phrase Christian nation occurs commonly in the writings of leaders of the Christian right. Proponents of the idea (such as David Barton and D. James Kennedy) argue that the Founding Fathers of the United States were overwhelmingly Christian, that founding documents such as the Declaration of Independence and the Constitution are based on Christian principles, and that a Christian character is fundamental to American culture. They cite, for example, the U.S. Supreme Court's comment in 1892 that "this [the United States] is a Christian nation" after they cite numerous historical and legal arguments in support of that statement.

Kennedy characterized his perspective on Christian political involvement as more akin to participatory democracy than to dominionism. In an interview with NPR's Terry Gross, Kennedy was asked whether he wanted all public office holders to be Christians. Kennedy answered, "We have people who are secular and humanist and unbelievers who are constantly supporting in every way possible other people who share those views. And I don't object to that. That's their privilege. And I think that Christians should be allowed the same privilege to vote for people whom they believe share their views about life and government. And that's all I'm talking about."

== Criticism of usage of term ==
Those labelled dominionists rarely use the terms dominionist and dominionism for self-description, and some people have attacked the use of such words. The journalist and conservative commentator Stanley Kurtz, writing for the National Review, labeled it "conspiratorial nonsense," "political paranoia," and "guilt by association", and decried Hedges' "vague characterizations" that allow him to "paint a highly questionable picture of a virtually faceless and nameless 'Dominionist' Christian mass". Kurtz also complained about a perceived link between average Christian evangelicals and extremism such as Christian reconstructionism:

The notion that conservative Christians want to reinstitute slavery and rule by genocide is not just crazy, it's downright dangerous. The most disturbing part of the Harper's cover story (the one by Chris Hedges) was the attempt to link Christian conservatives with Hitler and fascism. Once we acknowledge the similarity between conservative Christians and fascists, Hedges appears to suggest, we can confront Christian evil by setting aside 'the old polite rules of democracy.' So wild conspiracy theories and visions of genocide are really excuses for the Left to disregard the rules of democracy and defeat conservative Christians—by any means necessary.

Joe Carter of First Things writes:

[T]here is no "school of thought" known as "dominionism." The term was coined in the 1980s by Diamond and is never used outside liberal blogs and websites. No reputable scholars use the term for it is a meaningless neologism that Diamond concocted for her dissertation.

Diamond denies that she coined the broader sense of the term dominionism, which appears in her dissertation and in Roads to Dominion solely to describe dominion theology. Nevertheless, Diamond originated the idea that dominion theology is the "central unifying ideology for the Christian Right."

Jeremy Pierce of First Things coined the word dominionismist to describe those who promote the idea that there is a dominionist conspiracy and wrote:

It strikes me as irresponsible to lump [Rushdoony] together with Francis Schaeffer and those influenced by him, especially given Schaeffer's many recorded instances of resisting exactly the kinds of views Rushdoony developed. Indeed, it strikes me as an error of the magnitude of some of Rushdoony's own historical nonsense to consider there to be such a view called Dominionism [sic] that Rushdoony, Schaeffer, James Dobson, and all the other people in the list somehow share and that it seeks to get Christians and only Christians into all the influential positions in secular society.

Lisa Miller of Newsweek writes that "'dominionism' is the paranoid mot du jour" and that "certain journalists use 'dominionist' the way some folks on Fox News use the word sharia. Its strangeness scares people. Without history or context, the word creates a siege mentality in which 'we' need to guard against 'them'." Ross Douthat of The New York Times noted that "many of the people that writers like Diamond and others describe as 'dominionists' would disavow the label, many definitions of dominionism conflate several very different Christian political theologies, and there's a lively debate about whether the term is even useful at all."

Other criticism has focused on the proper use of the term. Berlet wrote that "just because some critics of the Christian Right have stretched the term dominionism past its breaking point does not mean we should abandon the term," and argued that rather than label conservatives as extremists, it would be better to "talk to these people" and "engage them." Diamond wrote, "Liberals' writing about the Christian Right's take-over plans has generally taken the form of conspiracy theory" and argued that instead, one should "analyze the subtle ways" that ideas like Dominionism "take hold within movements and why." The authors Robert Gagnon and Edith Humphrey argued strongly against the use of the term in reference to the US presidential candidate Ted Cruz in a 2016 op-ed for Christianity Today.

== See also ==
- Christ of Europe
- Christian democracy
- Christian Patriot movement
- Christian state
- Christian supremacy
- Evangelical environmentalism
- Münster rebellion
- National Catholicism
- Pan-Christianity
- Theodemocracy
