= Christian reconstructionism =

Fundamentalist Calvinist theonomic movement

Christian reconstructionism is a fundamentalist Calvinist theonomic movement. It developed primarily under the direction of R. J. Rushdoony, Greg Bahnsen and Gary North and has had an important influence on the Christian right in the United States. Its central theme is that society should be reconstructed under the lordship of Jesus in all aspects of life. In keeping with the biblical cultural mandate, reconstructionists advocate for theonomy and the restoration of certain biblical laws said to have continued applicability. These include the death penalty not only for murder, but also for idolatry, homosexuality, adultery, witchcraft and blasphemy.

Most Calvinists reject Christian reconstructionism and hold to classical covenant theology, which is the traditional Calvinist view of the relationship between the Old Covenant and Christianity.

Christian reconstructionism is closely linked with postmillennial eschatology and the presuppositional apologetics of Cornelius Van Til.

Religious studies scholar Julie Ingersoll traces the movement's origins to Calvinism, "Southern Presbyterianism, and mid-20th century right wing conservatism of the John Birch Society" and argues that the movement has helped shape Christian nationalism in the United States.

== Reconstructionist perspective ==
=== Theonomy ===
Christian reconstructionists advocate a theonomic government and libertarian economic principles. They maintain a distinction of spheres of authority between self, family, church, and state. For example, the enforcement of moral sanctions under theonomy is carried out by the family and church government, and sanctions for moral offenses are outside the authority of civil government (which is limited to criminal matters, courts and national defense). However, some believe these distinctions become blurred, as the application of theonomy implies an increase in the authority of the civil government. Reconstructionists also say that the theonomic government is not an oligarchy or monarchy of man communicating with God, but rather, a national recognition of existing laws. Some of the prominent advocates of Christian reconstructionism have written that according to their understanding, God's law approves of the death penalty not only for murder, but also for propagators of all forms of idolatry, open homosexuality, adulterers, practitioners of witchcraft, blasphemers, and perhaps even recalcitrant youths (see the List of capital crimes in the Bible).

Christian reconstructionism's founder, Rousas Rushdoony, wrote in The Institutes of Biblical Law (the founding document of reconstructionism) that Old Testament law should be applied to modern society, and he advocates the reinstatement of the Mosaic law's penal sanctions such as stoning. Under such a system, the list of civil crimes which carried a death sentence would include murder, homosexuality, adultery, incest, lying about one's virginity, bestiality, witchcraft, idolatry or apostasy, public blasphemy, false prophesying, kidnapping, rape, and bearing false witness in a capital case. However, Greg Bahnsen points out that such a system would only be possible if the culture at large were a Christian culture, and that the force of government could not be used to impose Christianity on a culture that did not want it.

Kayser points out that the Bible advocates justice, and that biblical punishments prescribed for crimes are the maximum allowable to maintain justice and not the only available option, because lesser punishments are authorized as well.

=== Views on pluralism ===
Rousas Rushdoony wrote in The Institutes of Biblical Law: "The heresy of democracy has since [the days of colonial New England] worked havoc in church and state" and: "Christianity and democracy are inevitably enemies", and he said elsewhere that "Christianity is completely and radically anti-democratic; it is committed to spiritual aristocracy," and characterized democracy as "the great love of the failures and cowards of life". He nevertheless repeatedly expressed his opposition to any sort of violent revolution and advocated instead the gradual reformation (often termed "regeneration" in his writings) of society from the bottom up, beginning with the individual and the family and from there gradually reforming other spheres of authority, including the church and the state.

Rushdoony believed that a republic is a better form of civil government than a democracy. According to Rushdoony, a republic avoided mob rule and the rule of the "51%" of society; in other words "might does not make right" in a republic. Rushdoony wrote that America's separation of powers between 3 branches of government is a far more neutral and better method of civil government than a direct democracy, stating "[t]he [American] Constitution was designed to perpetuate a Christian order". Rushdoony argues that the Constitution's purpose was to protect religion from the federal government and to preserve "states' rights."

Douglas W. Kennard, a Professor of Theology and Philosophy at the Houston Graduate School of Theology, wrote with regard to Christian reconstructionism, that Christians of non-Calvinist traditions, such as some "Baptist, Methodist, Catholic, [and] Orthodox", would be "under threat of capital punishment as fostered by the extreme Theonomist." On the other hand, Ligon Duncan has stated that "Roman Catholics to Episcopalians to Presbyterians to Pentecostals", as well as "Arminian and Calvinist, charismatic and non-charismatic, high Church and low Church traditions are all represented in the broader umbrella of Reconstructionism (often in the form of the "Christian America" movement)."

== Influence on the Christian right in general ==
Although it has a relatively small number of self-described adherents, Christian reconstructionism has played a role in promoting the trend toward explicitly Christian politics in the larger American Christian right. Religion scholar Julie Ingersoll argues that this extends to a connection with the more recent Christian nationalism movement. This is the wider trend to which some critics refer, generally, as dominionism. Also, they allegedly have an amount of influence which is disproportionate to their numbers among advocates of the growth of the Christian homeschooling movement and other Christian education movements that seek independence from the direct oversight or support of the civil government. Because their numbers are so small compared to their influence, they are sometimes accused of being secretive and conspiratorial.

In Matthew 28:18, Jesus says, "All power is given unto me in heaven and in earth." This verse is seen as an announcement by Jesus that he has assumed authority over all earthly authority. In that light, some theologians interpret the Great Commission as a command to exercise that authority in his name, bringing all things (including societies and cultures) into subjection under his commands. Rousas Rushdoony, for example, interpreted the Great Commission as a republication of the "creation mandate", referring to Genesis 1:28

Be fruitful, and multiply, and replenish the earth, and subdue it: and have dominion over the fish of the sea, and over the fowl of the air, and over every living thing…

For Rushdoony, the idea of dominion implied a form of Christian theocracy or, more accurately, a theonomy. For example, he wrote that:

The purpose of Christ's coming was in terms of the creation mandate… The redeemed are called to the original purpose of man, to exercise dominion under God, to be covenant-keepers, and to fulfil "the righteousness of the law" (Rom. 8:4)… Man is summoned to create the society God requires.

Elsewhere he wrote:

The man who is being progressively sanctified will inescapably sanctify his home, school, politics, economics, science, and all things else by understanding and interpreting all things in terms of the word of God.

Many evangelical Christians of all types have embraced Christian Reconstructionism in part or in whole. Evangelical leaders who endorsed it explicitly or implicitly include Jerry Falwell Sr., Bill Gothard, Jay Grimstead, D. James Kennedy, Tim LaHaye, Doug Phillips, Howard Phillips, Pat Robertson, Francis Schaeffer, and Wayne Whitehead. Gothard and the two Phillipses, for example, used Christian Reconstructionism to build the evangelical homeschooling community of the 1970s and 1980s. Robertson and Kennedy hosted Rushdoony on their television programs, and Robertson also used dominionist language in his book, The Secret Kingdom, and in his 1988 presidential campaign. Most recently, the pastor Douglas Wilson has been identified by Southern Poverty Law Center as having views influenced by R. J. Rushdoony, concluding, "Wilson's theology is in most ways indistinguishable from basic tenets of [Christian] Reconstruction."

Grimstead, of the Coalition on Revival, summarized the position of many evangelical leaders: "'I don't call myself [a Reconstructionist],' but 'A lot of us are coming to realize that the Bible is God's standard of morality ... in all points of history ... and for all societies, Christian and non-Christian alike... It so happens that Rushdoony, Bahnsen, and North understood that sooner.' He added, 'There are a lot of us floating around in Christian leadership—James Kennedy is one of them—who don't go all the way with the theonomy thing, but who want to rebuild America based on the Bible.'"

Some conservative Christian American politicians also are either reconstructionists or hold close connections to the movement. For instance, Herbert Titus, the lawyer for Roy Moore and former Vice Presidential candidate for the Constitution Party, was a reconstructionist.

== Christian critics ==
Michael Horton of Westminster Seminary California has warned against the seductiveness of power-religion. The Christian rhetoric of the movement is weak, he argues, against the logic of its authoritarian and legalistic program, which will always drive reconstructionism toward sub-Christian ideas about sin, and the perfectibility of human nature (such as to imagine that, if Christians are in power, they will not be inclined to do evil). On the contrary, Horton and others maintain, God's law can, often has been, and will be put to evil uses by Christians and others, in the state, in churches, in the marketplace, and in families; and these crimes are aggravated, because to oppose a wrong committed through abuse of God's law, a critic must bear being labeled an enemy of God's law.

J. Ligon Duncan of the Department of Systematic Theology of Reformed Theological Seminary in Jackson, Mississippi, warns that "Theonomy, in gross violation of biblical patterns and common sense, ignores the context of the giving of the law to the redemptive community of the Old Testament. This constitutes an approach to the nature of the civil law very different from Calvin and the rest of the Reformed tradition, which sees the civil law as God's application of his eternal standards to the particular exigencies of his people." Duncan rejects the reconstructionists' insistence that "the Old Testament civil case law is normative for the civil magistrate and government in the New Covenant era". He views their denial of the threefold distinction between moral, civil, and ceremonial law as representing one of the severe flaws in the reconstructionist hermeneutic.

The late Professor Meredith Kline, whose own theology has influenced the method of several reconstructionist theologians, adamantly maintained that reconstructionism made the mistake of failing to understand the special prophetic role of biblical Israel, including the laws and sanctions, calling it "a delusive and grotesque perversion of the teachings of scripture." Kline's student, Lee Irons, furthers the critique:

According to the Reformed theocrats apparently… the only satisfactory goal is that America become a Christian nation. Ironically… it is the wholesale rejection (not revival) of theocratic principles that is desperately needed today if the church is to be faithful to the task of gospel witness entrusted to her in the present age… It is only as the church… puts aside the lust for worldly influence and power – that she will be a positive presence in society.

Rodney Clapp wrote that reconstructionism is an anti-democratic movement.

In an April 2009 article in Christianity Today about theologian and writer Douglas Wilson, the magazine described reconstructionism as outside the "mainstream" views of evangelical Christians. It also stated that it "borders on a call for outright theocracy".

George M. Marsden, a professor of history at the University of Notre Dame, has remarked in Christianity Today that "Reconstructionism in its pure form is a radical movement". He also wrote, "[t]he positive proposals of Reconstructionists are so far out of line with American evangelical commitments to American republican ideals such as religious freedom that the number of true believers in the movement is small."

Popular religious author, feminist, and former Roman Catholic religious sister Karen Armstrong sees a potential for "fascism" in Christian reconstructionism, and sees the eventual Dominion envisioned by theologians R. J. Rushdoony and Gary North as "totalitarian. There is no room for any other view or policy, no democratic tolerance for rival parties, no individual freedom."

Traditional Calvinist Christians have argued that Christian reconstructionists have "significantly misunderstood the positions of Calvin, other Reformed teachers and the Westminster Confession concerning the relationship between the Sinai covenant's ethical stipulations and the Christian obligation to the Mosaic judicial laws today."

== Relationship to dominionism ==
Some sociologists and critics refer to reconstructionism as a type of dominionism. These critics claim that the frequent use of the word dominion by reconstructionist writers strongly associates the critical term "dominionism" with this movement. As an ideological form of dominionism, reconstructionism is sometimes held up as the most typical form of dominion theology.

The Protestant theologian Francis Schaeffer is linked with the movement by some critics, but some reconstructionist thinkers are highly critical of his positions. Schaeffer himself disavowed any connection or affiliation with reconstructionism, though he did cordially correspond with Rushdoony on occasion. Authors Sara Diamond and Fred Clarkson suggest that Schaeffer shared with reconstructionism the tendency toward dominionism.

Christian reconstructionists object to the "dominionism" and the "dominion theology" labels, which they say misrepresent their views. Some separate Christian cultural and political movements object to being described with the label "dominionism", because in their mind the word implies attachment to reconstructionism. In reconstructionism, the idea of "godly" dominion, subject to God, is contrasted with the "autonomous" dominion of mankind in rebellion against God.

== See also ==
- Afrikaner Calvinism
- Christian democracy
- Christian libertarianism
- Christian state
- Christianity
- New Apostolic Reformation
- Postmillennialism
- Presuppositional apologetics
- Sabbatarianism
- Seven Mountain Mandate
- Summary of Christian eschatological differences
- TheocracyWatch
