= Censorship in Germany =

Censorship has taken on many forms throughout the history of Germany. Various regimes have restricted the press, cinema, literature, and other entertainment venues. In contemporary Germany, the Grundgesetz (Basic Law) generally guarantees freedom of press, speech, and opinion. As of 2024, Germany is ranked 10th on the Press Freedom Index.

Today, censorship is mainly exerted in the form of restriction of access to certain media (examples include motion pictures and video games) to older adolescents or adults.

Furthermore, the publication of works violating the rights of the individual or those considered to be capable of inciting popular hatred (Volksverhetzung) may be prohibited. Possession of such works (including Adolf Hitler's Mein Kampf), however, is generally not punishable.

In recent years, public debate has intensified around political expression concerning the Israeli–Palestinian conflict. Critics argue that Germany’s Staatsräson — the reason of state asserting a special responsibility toward Israel — has been used to justify restrictions on pro-Palestinian speech, activism, and academic expression, including by Jewish individuals critical of Israeli government policies.

== Before 1871 ==
Most of the various smaller German states that later became the modern nation-state of Germany had censorship laws that severely restricted press freedom and made criticism of the government difficult or impossible. In large measure these were a result of the 1819 Carlsbad Decrees which, inter alia, expanded the censorship of the press. Censorship was enforced through the requirement to have a government license to publish books or newspapers, and the mandatory use of an impressum on printed material to identify authors and publishers. However, the city-republics such as Frankfurt and Hamburg tended to have a free press, a rarity in 19th century Germany. The Prussian invasion, occupation and annexation of Frankfurt was in large part motivated by the Prussian government's irritation with the Frankfurt free press; unlike Frankfurt, Prussia had severe censorship laws.

== German Empire (1871–1918) ==
In the German Empire, many forms of media were under imperial control. Before World War I, the government appointed civil administrators and bureaucrats who were in charge of ensuring the public decency of printed material within the Empire.

The Imperial Press Law of 1874 ended the government's right to censor materials before publishing. It also eliminated the need for a government-issued license to publish. However, the government retained the right to be notified of all publications when printing began and could prosecute editors for the content featured in their works. Most often, editors were imprisoned for the publication of material which insulted the monarch. At this point, theatres, cinemas, cabarets, and music halls were still subject to state licensing. Police had direct control over these venues.

Although overall restrictions on film were not codified into law at this time, movies were monitored and regulated. However, this process was subjective and varied case-by-case and locality by locality. The local government cut and banned any material deemed to be against their best interests. Universal state regulation across the entire Empire began in 1906 when several local police forces formed a collective task force to ban films involving Rudolf Hennig Hennig, a German murderer and fugitive, escaped arrest and embarrassed the police force. Officials hoping to contain news of his escape banned the film. In May 1906, government officials passed a police ordinance requiring that every film shown in Berlin must be examined by the police before it could be presented to public audiences. However, as the number of films and productions increased, it became difficult for police to regulate every work. As such, they attended screenings randomly to check for legal and moral compliance.

Although the state censorship authorities deployed officers all over the Empire, some localities set up their own field offices. The first of these field offices were established in 1912 in the cities of Munich and Stuttgart. These offices often created their own additional compliance requirements, but all films remained subject to the standards established by the state.

With the outbreak of World War I, the military took over the censorship office with the aim of mobilizing German support for the war. A police official was appointed in every city for this purpose. Restrictions on materials became much harsher. Materials could be banned because of association with a particular person or country, or simply because the censor felt that the piece was distracting or a waste of time. Newspapers could be suspended for days at a time as punishment for the publication of "inappropriate material".

== Weimar Republic (1918–1933) ==
Article 118 of the Weimar constitution banned censorship, but excepted film, indecent and obscene literature, and measures at public events to protect youth. Article 48 allowed the President to suspend this guarantee in order to restore public safety and order, with veto power over such actions given to the Reichstag.

An exception to this article was film. The film industry was regulated by the Film Assessment Headquarters. The purpose of this organization was to censor films released in Germany for pornography and other indecent content.

The Gesetz zur Bewahrung der Jugend vor Schund- und Schmutzschriften ("Law for the Protection of Youth from Trash and Filth Writings") of 18 December 1926 provided for the partial censorship (restrictions on distribution) of printed materials in the interest of youth welfare, though it was only applied post-publication on a case-by-case basis. Furthermore, it incorporated limits to what could be censored and on what grounds; printed materials could not be added to the index for political, social, religious, ethical, or world-view-related reasons. However, the goal of this regulation was to restrict content that could ruin the youth intellectually, morally, and physically. Such "harmful" content included dime novels, serialized books, and dramatic pamphlets.

The Weimar Republic maintained a number of criminal provisions for hate crimes and anti-Semitic expression. In response to violent political agitators such as the Nazis, authorities censored advocacy of violence; Emergency decrees were issued giving the power to censor newspapers, and Nazi newspapers were forced to suspend publication hundreds of times. Hitler was prevented from speaking in several German states, and leading Nazis such as Goebbels were sentenced to jail time in libel cases.

== Nazi Germany (1933–1945) ==
Shortly after Adolf Hitler rose to power in 1933, he established the Ministry of Propaganda with the goal that this agency would control all forms of mass communication in Germany. At its peak of influence, the Ministry employed 1,500 employees spanning 17 departments. Censorship policy was produced and implemented by the Reich Minister of Propaganda, Joseph Goebbels. As such, Goebbels oversaw the publication of all media that was to be widely distributed — literature, music, newspapers, and public events. Any material that threatened the reputation of Hitler's government or spoke ill of the regime was immediately censored and retracted. Additionally, books that were already in circulation and written by Jewish authors were collected and burned. Nazi bureaucrats saw their work and information control as necessary. It was, in their minds their duty to protect the German public from the harms of "undesirable books".

The control of information among young people was especially vital to the German government. On May 10, 1933, shortly after the Nazis rose to power, the government burned one-third of the total library holdings in Germany. As soldiers burned at least 25,000 books in the center of Berlin, Goebbels spoke of the evils of literature and encouraged massive crowds to say “No to decadence and moral corruption!”. This event began a widespread effort to illustrate government control and align public opinion with party ideology.

The aim of censorship under the Nazi regime was simple: to reinforce Nazi power and to suppress opposing viewpoints and information.

== Divided Germany ==
=== East Germany (1945–1990) ===
According to the Constitution of the German Democratic Republic (GDR), censorship of any kind was forbidden. However, the government of the GDR took measures to ensure that all publications were in line with their ideological grounding.

The Office of Head Administration for Publishing and Book Trade was tasked with regulating all material published within the GDR. The office aimed to produce material that was both politically correct and a reflection of communist values; however, the office was often advertised to the public as "a means for improving the quality of literature". Most division chiefs were literary figures with a history of party loyalty; oftentimes a former head of a publishing house or an author filled the role. In order to have material published and printed, an author or publisher had to submit the work to the Office and acquire a permit. Writers typically experienced a processing time of one to two months. Refusal to publish was not uncommon; a team of six typically rejected 250 manuscripts each year after receiving around 600. Approved books were published and around 10,000 copies of each book entered circulation.

Other types of art were also highly regulated. Permission was required to exhibit or perform any visual art. In addition, journalists without government approval were not hired.

The primary goal of East German censorship – whether it be to regulate books, films, or other forms of art – was to protect the interests of communism and its implementation. Works critical of the East German or Soviet governments were forbidden, as were any works which were alleged to be sympathetic to fascism.

Around 1989, as the people of East Germany grew more and more displeased with the state of the country, the rejection of material that celebrated West Germany heightened. Thousands of East Germans were fleeing west and the demand for West German materials – films, books, and magazines – was on the rise. As a result, the literature market for East German publications suffered. Books sat undistributed in Office warehouses as the demand for material was nearly nonexistent.

=== West Germany (1945–1990) ===
In the immediate aftermath of World War II, the West German media was subject to censorship by the forces of the Allied occupation. Authors, publishers, distributors, and sellers were all subject to prosecution for spreading "poisonous material". The representative of the Allied forces admitted that the order in principle was no different from the Nazi book burnings, although unlike the burnings, the measure was seen as a temporary part of the denazification program.

Another main goal of widespread censorship in West Germany was to protect youths from "poisonous" material. Government officials worked to prevent individuals under the age of eighteen from being exposed to content considered immoral, dangerous, or inappropriate. Tapes, films, books, magazines, and music were restricted and added to the list of "youth-endangering writings" should they showcase improper content. Officials took it upon themselves to rid young West Germans of content which featured expletives, sexual interactions, excessive affection, war, or substance use.

== Re-unified Germany (1990–present) ==
When the official government, the Federal Republic of Germany (Bundesrepublik Deutschland) took over in 1949, the limits on free speech were relaxed. The new German constitution from 1949 guaranteed freedom of press, speech, and opinion; the government continued to fight "anti-constitutional" activities, especially communist subversion during the Cold War. When East Germany ceased to exist and its territory became part of the Federal Republic of Germany in 1990, it became subject to the jurisdiction of the Federal Republic of Germany; the same protections and restrictions in West Germany apply to contemporary Germany. However, continued globalization and the advent of Internet marketing present a new host of complications to German censorship and information laws.

Publications violating laws (e.g., promoting Volksverhetzung or slander and libel) can be censored in today's Germany, with authors and publishers potentially subject to penalties. Strafgesetzbuch section 86a forms a relatively strict prohibition on the public display of "symbols of unconstitutional organizations" outside the context of "art or science, research or teaching". Such symbols include the swastika and the black flag of ISIL, although the legality of some symbols is dependent on the context in which they are displayed—a swastika may be displayed in a Buddhist temple, for example. Materials written or printed by organizations ruled to be anti-constitutional, like the NSDAP or the Red Army Faction (Baader–Meinhof Gang), have also been placed on the index. Public Holocaust denial is also prohibited and may be severely punished with up to five years in prison. A decision of a court that assumes that a publication is violating another person's personal rights may also lead to censoring (a newspaper for example can be forced not to publish private pictures).

An authority that is often accused of censorship is the Bundeszentrale für Kinder- und Jugendmedienschutz (Federal Department for the Protection of Children and Young People in the Media), which checks the media for possible dangers to young people. The body manages a list of works that may be purchased by adults only, and the exhibition (for sale) is usually also prohibited. While this indexing can grant publicity to some works, publishers often try to avoid indexing, to make the media available to a wider audience. Methods to avoid inclusion on the list include the reduction of violent scenes in movies and the removal of Nazi symbols in games in cases of propaganda. Education purposes and the freedom of arts allow the appearance of Nazi symbols in films and games in other cases.

The Unterhaltungssoftware Selbstkontrolle (USK) is a privately organized body that also controls (electronic) media regarding their suitability for minors. The German Jugendschutzgesetz (Youth Protection Act) of 2003 made the former advisory-only label a de facto requirement; only products controlled by such a body may be publicly displayed for sale, with further restrictions applying to such media considered to be "18+".

In the 1990s and 2000s, the struggle against Scientology in Germany has been a major issue, as Scientology is viewed by the German authorities as a predatory commercial organization, not a religion. Scientology remains under government surveillance, and there have been attempts to ban the organization entirely.

The burning of foreign flags is punishable by law in Germany if it involves "a flag of a foreign state that is publicly displayed by virtue of legal provisions or recognized custom". Additionally, publicly burning or damaging foreign flags or any flags that resemble them has also been prohibited since 24 June 2020. This legislation was passed in response to the repeated burning of the Israeli flag during protests and demonstrations.

In 2022, several German states have banned public displays of the "Z symbol", a symbol used for supporters of the Russian invasion of Ukraine. "The Russian attack on Ukraine is a crime and whoever publicly approves of this war can thereby become criminally liable," said Marek Wede, a spokesperson for Germany's Interior Ministry. Critics of this policy note that banning the public display of the letter "Z" does not assist Ukraine and that it may embolden supporters of Russia who already claim to feel victimized.

On November 2, 2023 in response to the 2023 Israel–Hamas war, the German Interior Ministry announced a ban on the slogan "From the River to the Sea" as part of the German government's prohibition of Palestinian terrorist organization Hamas and pro-Palestinian network Samidoun. As a result, the use of the phrase could be punished by a fine and imprisonment for a period of up to three years. However, legal experts and historians dispute whether this slogan can be attributed to Hamas. Courts across Germany have issued contradictory rulings on the use of this slogan and the Federal Court of Justice has yet to take up the case. Flags and symbols of groups classified as being terrorist organisations in Germany, including the Popular Front for the Liberation of Palestine, Palestinian Islamic Jihad and Hezbollah, are also prohibited.

Berlin's Education Senator issued a decree allowing Berlin schools to decide whether to prohibit the wearing of the Palestinian keffiyeh on 16 November 2023, explaining to school administrators that wearing the keffiyeh could be understood as advocating or condoning the attacks against Israel or supporting the terrorist organizations, such as Hamas or Hezbollah, which carry them out, and pose a threat to school peace. However, this policy has been criticized by other politicians as being a blanket ban on legitimate Palestinian symbols and in their view, might not be legal under German constitutional law.

On 14 May and 1 July 2024, Björn Höcke, the leader of the AfD in Thuringia, was fined by a court for using the Nazi slogan "Everything for Germany".

On 16 July 2024, Interior minister Nancy Faeser ordered the banning of the magazine Compact. Criticism was raised that the magazine was classified as an association and banned under association law. The ban was unlawful, as the Federal Administrative Court ruled on 18 July 2024.

=== Restrictions on Pro-Palestinian expression ===
German authorities implemented a series of measures that significantly limited pro-Palestinian expression, citing the reason of state as justification. In Germany, the term Staatsräson (reason of state) is most commonly associated with Germany's perceived obligation to the security of the state of Israel in light of the Holocaust.

Critics argue that this doctrine has come to shape public discourse in ways that constrain dissent. The Global Public Policy Institute (GPPi) describes the effect as producing a “manufactured unquestionability” around Israeli state actions, undermining democratic deliberation. Cultural theorist Bue Rübner Hansen similarly contends that Staatsräson functions as a form of "performative anti-fascism", in which support for Israel is framed as a moral obligation expressed through the policing of language rather than substantive commitments to justice, pluralism, or anti-racism. These dynamics have raised concerns about civil liberties, freedom of expression, and academic freedom, particularly in cases involving criticism of Israeli policy — including by Jewish individuals and groups.

A key precedent was set in 2019, when the German Parliament passed a non-binding resolution declaring the Boycott, Divestment and Sanctions (BDS) movement to be antisemitic. While not legally enforceable, the resolution has been used by public institutions, universities, and cultural organizations as grounds to deny funding, cancel events, or disinvite speakers associated with BDS. These concerns were amplified in November 2024 when the Bundestag further institutionalized the IHRA Working Definition of Antisemitism, which has been criticized for conflating criticism of Israel with antisemitism, therefore restricting legitimate political expression. Educational initiatives, university programs, and civil society activities have been scrutinized or defunded under this framework. Shelly Steinberg from the Jewish–Palestinian Dialogue Group Munich (JPDG) stated that "after the adoption of this resolution, it will look very dark in Germany's cultural spheres. German artists, cultural workers, and scientists will be censored or will self-censor out of fear of losing financial support or being labeled as antisemitic". For example, the Jewish-Israeli art collective The School for Unlearning Zionism had its funding revoked by a Berlin university following media reports linking it to BDS.

German authorities’ restrictions on pro-Palestinian speech and events has also impacted anti-war Jewish activists and vigils organized by Jewish groups on the grounds that they could involve antisemitic expressions. These restrictions have been criticized for relying on the IHRA Working Definition of Antisemitism. On 16 October 2023, Berlin’s Education Senator prohibited the wearing of the Palestinian keffiyeh in schools, citing its alleged association with support for militant groups. In November 2023, the German Interior Ministry classified the slogan "From the River to the Sea" as being associated with Hamas and the pro-Palestinian network Samidoun. Use of the slogan could therefore be prosecuted as giving support to proscribed organisations. German courts have however applied this decision unevenly with some ruling that the slogan is protected free speech.

Numerous artists, intellectuals, and public figures have reported being disinvited from events, exhibitions, and academic platforms due to perceived criticism of Israeli policy. These include Jewish figures such as journalist Masha Gessen, whose award ceremony was canceled by the Heinrich Böll Foundation over remarks comparing Gaza to Jewish ghettos. Other incidents include the withdrawal of invitations for Jewish-Israeli philosopher Omri Boehm and the cancellation of an award ceremony for author Adania Shibli. LMU Munich canceled a public lecture by UN Special Rapporteur Francesca Albanese on colonialism and international law, citing “security concerns” and anticipated public controversy. Following campaigns against Middle East scholar Muriel Asseburg, several universities have canceled events or retracted appointments. In 2024, the University of Cologne withdrew a professorship from Nancy Fraser after she criticized Israeli actions in Gaza. Other cases include the dismissal of anthropologist Ghassan Hage and the attempted defunding of over 1,000 professors by the Federal Minister of Education for signing an open letter condemning police violence against student protesters. In November 2024, photographer Nan Goldin alleged censorship of her Berlin exhibition, claiming the Neue Nationalgalerie refused a slide expressing solidarity with Palestinian, Lebanese, and Israeli conflict victims. Jewish and Palestinian students, artists, and scholars describe a climate of fear and self-censorship.

Several pro-Palestinian advocates have lost employment or had their visas revoked. Civil society organizations and Jewish intellectuals have issued open letters condemning what they describe as disproportionate and politically motivated responses that raise concerns about infringement of basic civil rights.

In 2025, several international residents, including EU and U.S. citizens, received deportation orders after participating in pro-Palestinian protests. Authorities cited the occupation of a university building as justification. Notably, three of the four orders explicitly invoked Staatsräson as a rationale. Legal experts and a Bundestag review questioned the use of this reasoning, noting that Staatsräson holds no legal standing under German immigration law.

=== Criminalization of insults against politicians ===
As per §185 StGB, insulting another person is a crime in Germany, and can be punished by up to 2 years in prison. However, charges related to this law are only pursued following a complaint by the victim. In 2021, §188 StGB, a law criminalizing defamation and malicious statements directed at politicians, was tightened. Thereafter, the law also covered insults directed at politicians, however, in contrast to §185 StGB, the maximum penalty for insult was increased to 3 years in prison and the crime can be pursued by the state prosecutor even without request by the victim. As of 2026, however, §188 came under increased criticism in the Bundestag and at the Justizministerkonferenz.

A widely publicised case involved Hamburg politician Andy Grote who, upon learning about a party taking place in violation of COVID-19 lockdown rules, accused partygoers of ignorance and stupidity in a post on Twitter. Said post was replied to by a user commenting “Du bist so 1 Pimmel” (“You are such a dick”), who was reported by Grote and subsequently had his apartment searched and electronic devices seized by the police. The charges were eventually dropped in 2022 due to triviality, however the case attracted widespread attention and mockery throughout Germany, with prominent politicians calling for Grote to resign and Grote’s reaction being considered an example of the Streisand effect. The case subsequently became known as “Pimmelgate”, referencing the -gate nomenclature used to refer to scandals, with the #pimmelgate hashtag going viral on Twitter in Germany.

The topic drew international attention in February 2025, following a controversial speech held by US Vice President JD Vance at the Munich security conference. In his speech, Vance criticised the German police for searching the homes of Internet users alleged to have posted misogynistic comments online, along with criticism directed at other European countries such as the UK, Sweden and Romania. Vance argued that censorship poses a greater danger to European democracy than external adversaries like Russia or China. The speech was widely condemned by European politicians who accused Vance of attempting to downplay the role of Russia and China in European elections, while many American officials supported Vance, criticising Europe’s alleged reliance on the United States and excessive government overreach.

That same month, TV program 60 Minutes released an episode presenting a team of German police investigators tasked with reporting online hate speech as well as police officers searching alleged perpetrators’ homes and seizing their electronic devices. The content reported included a comic described as racist and a meme advocating for violence against asylum seekers. The episode sparked outrage in the United States, with many prominent figures criticising the laws portrayed within it, including Vice President JD Vance, who posted on X that “insults are not a crime” and described the episode as “Orwellian”. In Germany, reactions were more positive. The episode and the reactions to it were described as highlighting the stark differences in opinion regarding freedom of speech between Germany and the United States.

Several German politicians have reported alleged insults directed against them, for example Robert Habeck and Annalena Baerbock of The Greens, with 805 and 513 reports respectively as of September 2024. Habeck was also the subject of a well-known case in early 2024, in which a retiree from Bavaria reposted an image calling him “Schwachkopf” (“moron”). The retiree subsequently had his house searched and his tablet seized, however it was later confirmed that the search took place because the accused had also posted a Nazi-related image considered to be antisemitic.

In October 2025, the Heilbronn police department made a Facebook post announcing the creation of a no-fly zone around the city as part of a visit by German Chancellor Friedrich Merz, which led to approximately 400 comments being submitted by users discussing the topic. Subsequently, state prosecutors announced that they had launched investigations into a total of 38 separate comments related to the post which were deemed to be in violation of insult laws.

Amongst these comments was a remark reading "Pinocchio kommt nach HN" ("Pinocchio [referring to Merz] is coming to [Heilbronn]"), a statement later traced back to a local retiree and deemed illegal under §188 StGB. The criminal investigation into the case was soon shut down as the state attorney decided that the statement was protected as free speech, but the case was widely publicised and drew criticism from an American diplomat who compared Germany’s insult laws to lèse-majesté laws.

Another case related to said post gained attention in May 2026, in which a man was convicted under §188 StGB and ordered to pay a fine equivalent to 30 days' income due to having referred to Chancellor Friedrich Merz as "Lackaffe" (a derogatory term for an arrogant or vain man) in a comment. On 29 May, it was announced that an appeal had been made allowing the case to be closed upon the payment of a €100 fine.

Shortly after, in early June 2026, a similar case drew widespread attention throughout the country, when a person who had called Merz "Lügenfritz" ("liar") within a separate comment in response to the October 2025 post was also convicted under §188 StGB and ordered to pay a fine equal to 30 days' income. However, contrary to the May 2026 case, the verdict in this case has been confirmed to be final, with the total fine likely to exceed €2000 when considering the average salary. The prosecutors justified their decision by stating that although the content of the comment in question may not have been illegal, the comment had the potential to encourage aggression towards Merz and reduce the public's trust in his integrity.

The verdict led to criticism throughout Germany, with commentators questioning both the proportionality of the fine and the prosecution's decision to act without a complaint from Merz. Volker Boehme-Neßler, Professor of Public Law at Oldenburg, wrote in Cicero that the case exhibits how §188 is dangerous to democracy, using it to argue that the provision should be removed from the criminal code entirely.

=== Movement to repeal criminalization of insults against politicians ===
Since 2025, there has been growing political pressure to reform or repeal §188 StGB, the provision criminalizing defamation and malicious statements directed at politicians. According to police crime statistics, the number of investigations under §188 had ballooned from about 1,400 in 2022 to 4,792 in 2025. In September 2025, the AfD introduced a bill to repeal §188 entirely, which all other parties voted down, 440–133, the following January 29. In June 2026, a second abolition bill, also by the AfD, was both read and referred to committee, with CDU/CSU signaling openness to reform. As CDU deputy faction leader Günter Krings told Der Spiegel, "We don't need special criminal law for politicians. I am therefore open to abolishing §188." SPD legal spokesperson Carmen Wegge opposed abolition.

=== Religious censorship ===
In 2002, there was a legal controversy regarding the Power for Living campaign by the Christian Arthur S. DeMoss Foundation featuring celebrities Cliff Richard and Bernhard Langer. The TV advertisements for their book were banned because they were considered as "advertising a worldview or religion", which is forbidden by § 7 section 8 of the state treaty on broadcasting (Rundfunkstaatsvertrag) and European laws on media. For its posters, newspaper adverts and leaflets, however, there was no such problem.

=== Network Enforcement Act ===
The Network Enforcement Act or NetzDG which was passed in the Bundestag in 2017 has been criticized heavily by politicians, human rights groups, journalists and academics for incentivising social media platforms to pre-emptively censor valid and lawful expression, and making them the arbiter of what constitutes free expression and curtailing freedom of speech in Germany.

== See also ==
- Bans on communist symbols
- Bans on Nazi symbols
- Firewall against the far-right in Germany
- Nazi propaganda
- Strafgesetzbuch section 86a
- Video game censorship in Germany
