= Film Review Office =

Former film censorship office in Germany

- Filmprüfstelle
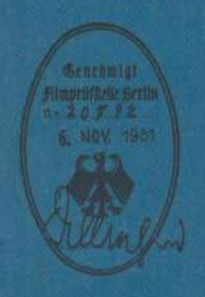

Office overview
- Formed: 1920
- Dissolved: 1945
- Superseding Office: Voluntary Self-Regulation of the Film Industry (Freiwillige Selbstkontrolle der Filmwirtschaft)
- Jurisdiction: Germany
- Headquarters: Berlin and Munich
- Parent department: Propagandaministerium

In the Weimar Republic, and later in Nazi Germany, the Film Review Office (German: Filmprüfstelle) was responsible for censorship of the film industry within Germany. The Office had two locations: one in Berlin and one in Munich.

== Legal basis ==
Article 118 of the Weimar constitution forbade censorship outright, with the text "No censorship will take place." On May 12, 1920, however, the Weimar government passed the "Lichtspielgesetz" (Cinema Act). This law established an ordinance to regulate the exhibition of visual media. The two largest film producers were based out of Berlin and Munich, respectively. As such, the Film Review Office was based out of these two cities.

The Munich Office was given jurisdiction over the states of Bavaria, Württemberg, Baden, and Hessia. The Berlin Office was given jurisdiction over the rest of Germany. In addition, a supervisory headquarters (German: Oberprüfstelle) was established in Berlin.

== Weimar years ==
From 1920 to 1924, the supervisory headquarters was chaired by Dr. Carl Bulcke; in 1924 he was replaced by Ernst Seeger (who later served as Minister of Film in the Propagandaministerium under Joseph Goebbels). Each office had a chair appointed by the Minister of the Interior. That chair chose a panel out of leading figures from film, literature, the arts, education, and social welfare.

The Film Review Office reviewed films along with their titles and advertising material. This included films which were released before the Cinema Act was passed if they were re-released in theaters. Foreign films due for release in Germany also needed to be submitted to the Film Review Office. Review was mandatory; refusal to submit a film carried a monetary fine. The process, however, was not public: reviews were held privately and results were returned directly to the film firms.

Censorship by the Film Review Office served as a security consideration. The only grounds on which a film could be censored were in perceived cases of danger to the interests of the state or in threats to public order and security. Films determined unobjectionable were then submitted to the Parliament (German: Reichsrat) for review of artistic aspects by the Central Institute for Education and Instruction.

== Nazi years ==
The Second Cinema Act was passed on 16 February 1934. This entailed several changes to the Film Review Office, centralizing the censorship of film. The office in Munich was closed; thereafter all film was censored by the Berlin office. The Propagandaministerium took over the job of overseeing the office.

With the new system came new principles; the line between censorship for security and aesthetic censorship disappeared and the Film Review Office began censoring on artistic grounds. The Führerprinzip became the guiding principle of the headquarters. The council was reduced to a purely advisory function and the chair, under supervision of the Propagandaminister, had the final word on all films.

At the end of the war, the film inspection agency had to stop its work and ceased to exist with the fall of Nazi Germany. In the Federal Republic of Germany, the Voluntary Self-Regulation of the Film Industry (German: Freiwillige Selbstkontrolle der Filmwirtschaft, FSK) was created as a democratic alternative.

== See also ==
- Censorship in Germany

== Resources ==
. The German article references the following sources:

- Ursula von Keitz, Filme vor Gericht. Theorie und Praxis der Filmprüfung in Deutschland 1920 bis 1938, Frankfurt/Main 1999
- Klaus-Jürgen Maiwald, Filmzensur im NS-Staat, Dortmund (Nowotny) 1983
