= Network Enforcement Act =

German social media regulation law

The Network Enforcement Act (Netzwerkdurchsetzungsgesetz, NetzDG; German: Gesetz zur Verbesserung der Rechtsdurchsetzung in sozialen Netzwerken), also known colloquially as the Facebook Act (Facebook-Gesetz), is a German law that was passed in the Bundestag in 2017 that officially aims to combat fake news, hate speech and misinformation online.

The Act obliges social media platforms with over 2 million users to remove "clearly illegal" content within 24 hours and all illegal content within 7 days of it being posted, or face a maximum fine of 50 million Euros. The deleted content must be stored for at least 10 weeks afterwards, and platforms must submit transparency reports on dealing with illegal content every six months. It was passed by the Bundestag in June 2017 and took full effect in January 2018.

The law has been criticised both locally and internationally by politicians, human rights groups, journalists and academics for incentivising social media platforms to pre-emptively censor valid and lawful expression, and making them the arbiter of what constitutes free expression and curtailing freedom of speech in Germany.

An evaluation ordered by the German Ministry of Justice and executed by Berkeley and Cambridge scientists came to the conclusion that the law has led to a "significant improvement in complaints management and public accountability of network providers in dealing with designated illegal content" while specifying a range of tasks to be tackled like ascertainments in wording.

== Background ==
In 2015, the Federal Ministry of Justice and Consumer Protection set up a working group on the handling of criminal content in social networks. Some networks made voluntary commitments, but the ministry considered them insufficient.

Justice Minister Heiko Maas combated that an evaluation of legal practice in the deletion of criminal content in social networks by "jugendschutz.net" in early 2017 revealed that deletions of hateful comments were insufficient, and he called for further increased pressure on social networks. To make companies more accountable, he considered that legal regulations were needed. Although 90 percent of the punishable content was deleted on YouTube, it was only 39 percent on Facebook and only 1 percent on Twitter.

== Drafting and enactment ==
On May 16, 2017, the government parties CDU/CSU and SPD introduced the bill to the Bundestag. According to the federal government, social networks would be forced to remove hate speech more consistently. The maximum penalty for a failure to abide by the law would be 50 million Euros.

The draft law referred to commercial social networks on the Internet with at least 2 million members, not to journalistically- and editorially-designed services (§ 1 NetzDG). Providers must establish a transparent procedure for dealing with complaints about illegal content (§ 3 NetzDG) and are subject to a reporting and documentation obligation (§ 2 NetzDG). They must check complaints immediately, delete "obviously illegal" content within 24 hours, delete any illegal content within 7 days it has been checked and block access to it. Complainants and users must be informed immediately of the decisions taken. The deleted content must be stored for at least ten weeks for evidence purposes. Violations are considered administrative offences for which sensitive fines of up to 5 million euros are provided (§ 4 NetzDG). In addition, providers must provide a service agent in Germany both to the authorities and for civil proceedings (§ 5 NetzDG). Social networks are expected to submit a report every six months on the complaints that have been received and how they have been dealt with.

However, the first reading on May 19 showed that the draft was controversial within the CDU/CSU and SPD. Representatives of the CDU/CSU and the SPD parliamentary groups made changes to the draft. The Bundestag passed the amended draft on 30 June 2017 with most votes of the government factions against the votes of the Left and the CSU, with the abstention of Alliance 90/The Greens.

== Criticism ==
According to the Federal government of Germany, the law is necessary to combat an increasing spread of hate speech online, as well as defamation and fake news. Such content may radicalise individuals, and "the internet shapes the culture of debate and the overall social climate" in Germany. Previous attempts to raise awareness and set voluntary commitments for platforms have had limited success. However, various aspects of the law have been criticised by multiple interest groups.

=== Human rights and journalist groups ===
Reporters Without Borders (RSF) stated that the Act could "massively damage the basic rights to freedom of the press and freedom of expression." The Human Rights Watch has called the law "flawed", stating it could lead to unaccountable, overbroad censorship. It added that the law would set a dangerous precedent for other governments that also wish to restrict online speech by forcing companies to censor on their behalf. Indeed, the RSF also noted that Germany's law had also influenced Russia's implementation of its own hate speech law.

The Committee to Protect Journalists' Courtney Radsch warned that the law would risk privatizing censorship. The Oxford Internet Institute warned that the law may heavily restrict freedom of expression and Internet freedom.

IT experts also described the planned regulations as "censorship infrastructure". Journalists that criticized the law include Matthias Spielkamp of RSF, who called the design "shameful". Harald Martenstein of the newspaper Der Tagesspiegel called it "Erdoğanism in pure culture" and explained that the draft law reads as if "it came from the 1984 novel" that it was an "attack on the principle of the separation of powers".

Academics and experts also expect the short and rigid deletion periods and the high threat of fines to lead the networks to prefer to remove contributions in case of doubt, even if the freedom of expression guaranteed by fundamental rights would require a context-related consideration, such as in the differentiation between prohibited insult and permitted satire. In April 2017, an alliance of business associations, network politicians, civil rights activists, scientists and lawyers joined forces to protest against the law. In a manifesto, they warned of "catastrophic consequences for freedom of expression".

=== United Nations ===
In June 2017, the United Nations Special Rapporteur for the Protection of Freedom of Opinion and Expression, David Kaye, criticised the planned regulations in a statement to the federal government. He considered that some parts of the draft law would be incompatible with the International Covenant on Civil and Political Rights. He raised the following concerns:

- Online providers would have to delete information partly on the basis of "vague and ambiguous" criteria.
- The maximum fines would be disproportionate to the offence itself, and "may prompt social networks to remove content that may be lawful." Especially due to the short timeframes for removing content (7 days for illegal content and 24 hours for clearly illegal content), could lead providers to engage in precautionary censorship by deleting legitimate expression.
- The legality of information is often dependent on context, which would be difficult for platforms to accurately evaluate.

Kaye also expressed concerns that "violative content" and its associated user information would have to be stored on private servers and could be accessed by court orders, which may undermine the right to anonymous expression. Furthermore, the Act would burden private companies with protecting the privacy and security of large amounts of private data.

=== Council of Europe ===
Experts argue that the law may violate freedom of expression as enumerated in Article 5 of German Basic Law, as well as in Article 10 of the European Convention on Human Rights, which states the following:

"1. Everyone has the right to freedom of expression. This right shall include freedom to hold opinions and to receive and impart information and ideas without interference by public authority and regardless of frontiers. This Article shall not prevent States from requiring the licensing of broadcasting, television or cinema enterprises. 2. The exercise of these freedoms, since it carries with it duties and responsibilities, may be subject to such formalities, conditions, restrictions or penalties as are prescribed by law and are necessary in a democratic society, in the interests of national security, territorial integrity or public safety, for the prevention of disorder or crime, for the protection of health or morals, for the protection of the reputation or rights of others, for preventing the disclosure of information received in confidence, or for maintaining the authority and impartiality of the judiciary."

The Network Enforcement Act incentivizes over-blocking, because it allows citizens and tech companies to make judgement on questionable speech immediately by blocking it within 24 hours, instead of allowing it to propagate or cause harm while waiting for a court's decision. This necessity of speed in removal makes it difficult for people posting such content to have due process in determining the content's legality. Over-blocking could be a violation of Article 10 because there is potential to block speech that is lawful. Some scholars say that prioritizing Germany's laws over EU regulations while legislating on this subject of increasing importance is a mistake, and that the EU should be the one to legislate in such realms, especially since the internet is such an international place.

=== Counter Extremism Project – CEPS Report ===
In 2018, the advocacy group Counter Extremism Project published a joint report with the think tank Centre for European Policy Studies analysing the effects of the Network Enforcement Act. The authors concluded it "remains uncertain whether NetzDG has achieved significant results in reaching its stated goal of preventing hate speech" as some platforms did not strictly comply with the requirements.

=== European Commission's silence ===
The European Commission has refused to review the documents on the law that examines the compatibility of the law with European Union law with regard to the European Convention on Human Rights (ECHR) and the European legal requirements in the area of "Information Society Services" (e-commerce directive). An inquiry by the German business magazine Wirtschaftswoche was rejected on the grounds that "the publication of the documents... would affect the climate of mutual trust between the member state (Germany) and the Commission".

According to a regulation issued in 2001, the EU Commission must make internal documents available on request. Wirtschaftswoche wrote: "This confirms the suspicion that the law does indeed violate EU law, but Brussels does not want to offend Germany".

== Impacts ==
=== Facebook fine for underreporting complaints ===
In July 2019, Facebook was fined 2 million Euros by Germany's Federal Office of Justice for under-reporting complaints about illegal content. According to Germany's Federal Office of Justice, Facebook did not include user reports that posts violated community standards. However, Facebook claimed that aspects of the law "lacked clarity" and it did comply with mandatory reporting requirements.

Facebook has criticised the draft law. In a statement sent to the German Bundestag at the end of May 2017, the company stated: "The constitutional state must not pass on its own shortcomings and responsibility to private companies. Preventing and combating hate speech and false reports is a public task from which the state must not escape". In its statement, Facebook claimed "The amount of the fines is disproportionate to the sanctioned behaviour".

=== Google lawsuit ===
In 2021, Google filed a lawsuit against the law.

== See also ==
- Censorship in Germany
- Human rights in Germany
