= Impressum =

Legally mandated statement of the ownership and authorship of a document

An Impressum (from Latin impressum, 'the impressed, engraved, pressed in, impression') is a legally mandated statement of the ownership and authorship of a document, which must be included in books, newspapers, magazines, websites, and business correspondence published or otherwise made available to consumers in Germany and certain other German-speaking countries, such as Austria and Switzerland, and also in countries historically influenced by German culture, such as Hungary. The Telemediengesetz (German, meaning 'Telemedia Act') mandates the use of an Impressum.

== In Germany ==
The Telemediengesetz requires that German websites disclose information about the publisher, including their name and address, telephone number or e-mail address, trade registry number, VAT number, and other information depending on the type of company. German websites are defined as being published by individuals or organisations that are based in Germany, so an Impressum is required regardless of whether a site is in the .de domain.

Historically, the German Impressum requirement has its roots in the censorship laws of 19th century and earlier monarchies, and has been criticized as illiberal and contrary to the principle of free speech; most other countries have no comparable requirement.

This law has created privacy concerns for individuals who maintain blogs or personal homepages. The law has also caused lawyers to scrutinise websites for this information and send Abmahnung (cease and desist) letters to their maintainers in the event it is missing.

Facebook offers a way for users to add an Impressum for user-created public pages.

== Internationally ==
There is no equivalent legislation in the United States. The closest English-language terms for Impressum are:

- Masthead: for newspapers and magazines, a list, usually found on the editorial page, of the members of its board.
- Colophon: for books, a note indicating metadata about the book such as the date of publication, printer and publisher.
- "Site notice", "Legal notice", "Legal information" or "Legal disclosure": for websites in English, a page title commonly used to link to legal metadata and terms of use.

None of these terms is an exact equivalent in all contexts. The terms "masthead" and "colophon" apply to printed publications only and are not commonly used on English-language websites, while "site notice" is website-specific and "legal notice" or "legal disclosure" are rarely found in printed works. An "imprint" in publishing may also mean a brand name under which a work is published, and so may not be understood to mean an Impressum.

=== United Kingdom ===
In printed media, an Impressum is identical to the "printer's imprint" as defined under UK law. Under the Printer's Imprint Act 1961, which amended the earlier Newspapers, Printers, and Reading Rooms Repeal Act 1869, any printer must put their name and address on the first or last leaf of every paper or book they print or face a penalty of up to £50 per copy.

The UK's Political Parties, Elections and Referendums Act 2000 extends the use of imprints in the case of election material to include all forms of communication, including websites and social media accounts. All election material is also required to show the name of the promoter of the material and the name and address of the person on whose behalf it is being published.
