= Palestinian key =

Palestinian symbol of homes lost in 1948

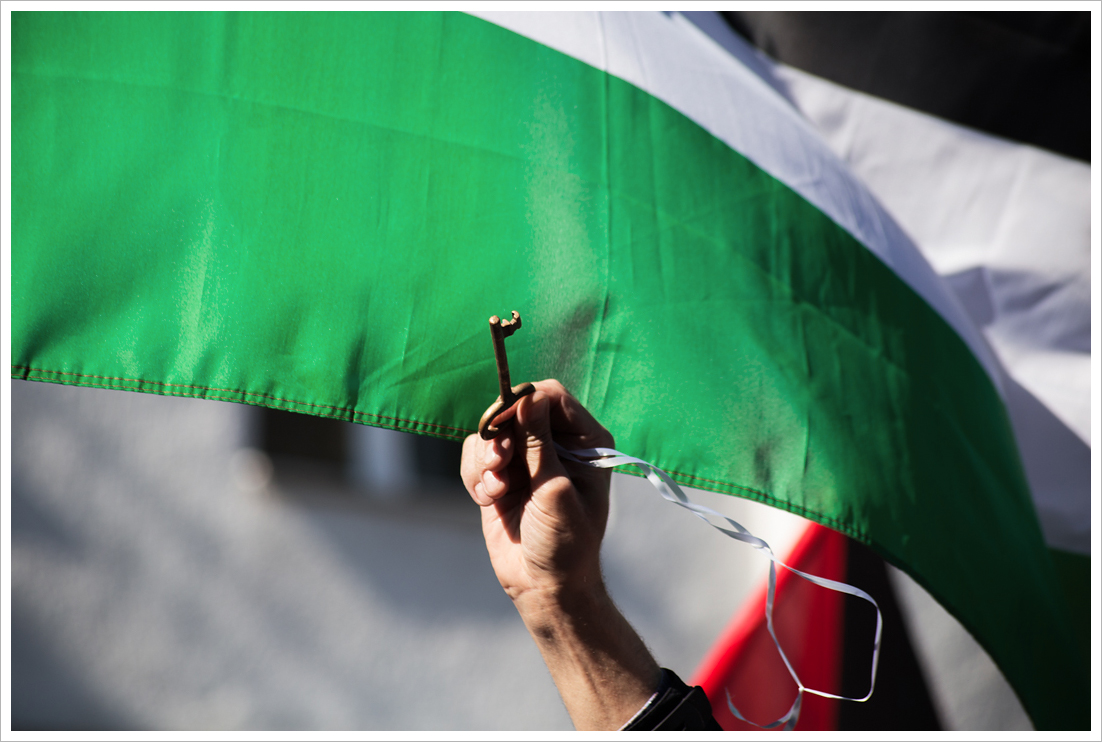
Palestinian key at a Nakba Day demonstration in Berlin, Germany

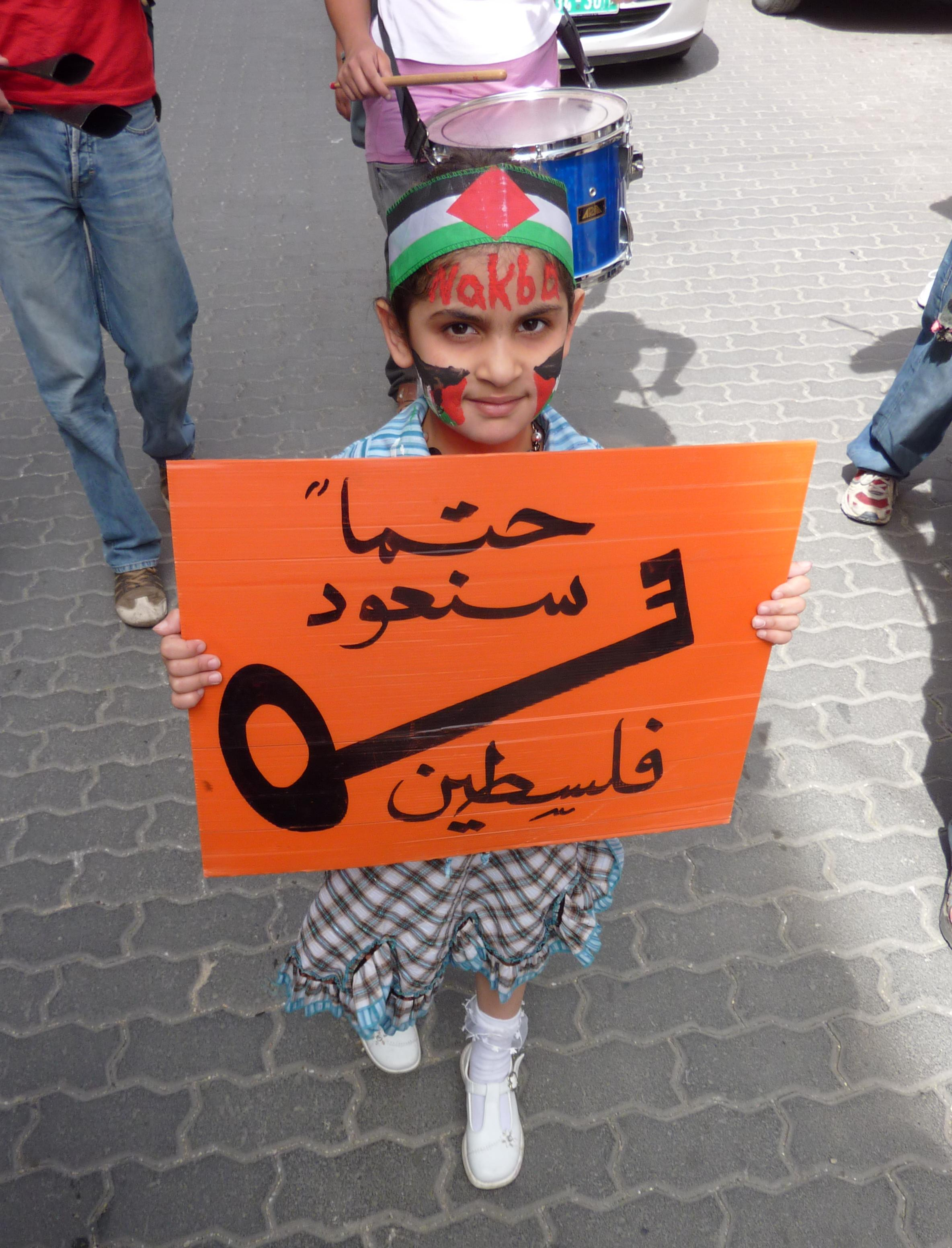
Young girl with a key drawing in Nakba Day, Hebron, 2010. The sign says "We will return to Palestine"

The Palestinian key is the Palestinian symbol of homes lost in the 1948 Nakba, when more than half of the population of Mandatory Palestine were ethnically cleansed by Zionist militias as part of the 1948 Palestinian expulsion and flight, and were subsequently denied the right to return. The key is considered part of a hope for return and a claim to the lost properties.

== Description ==
The keys are large and old-fashioned in style.

Enlarged replicas are often found around Palestinian refugee camps, and used at pro-Palestinian demonstrations around the world as collective symbols.

== Gallery ==
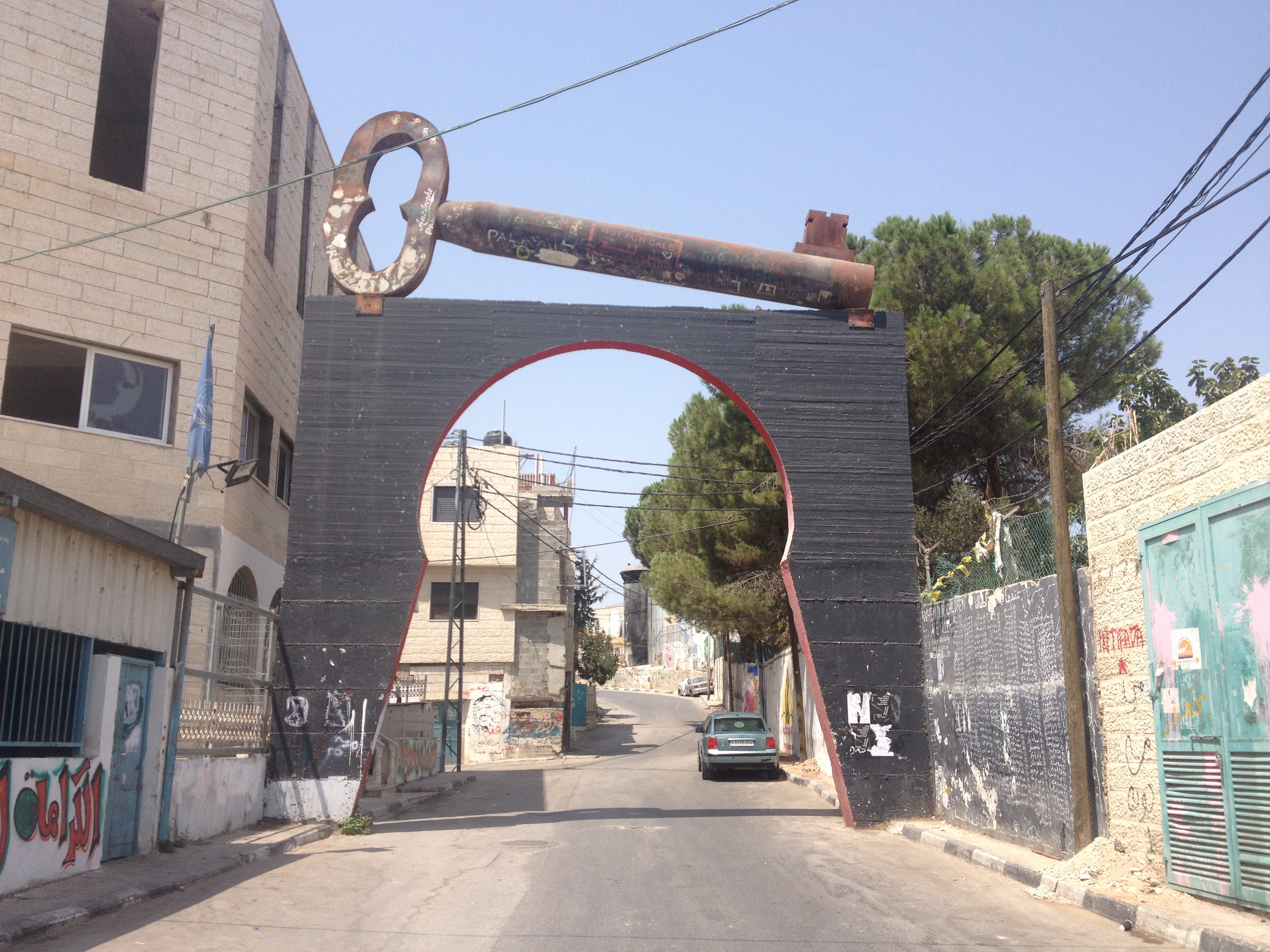
Entrance to the Aida refugee camp, near Bethlehem

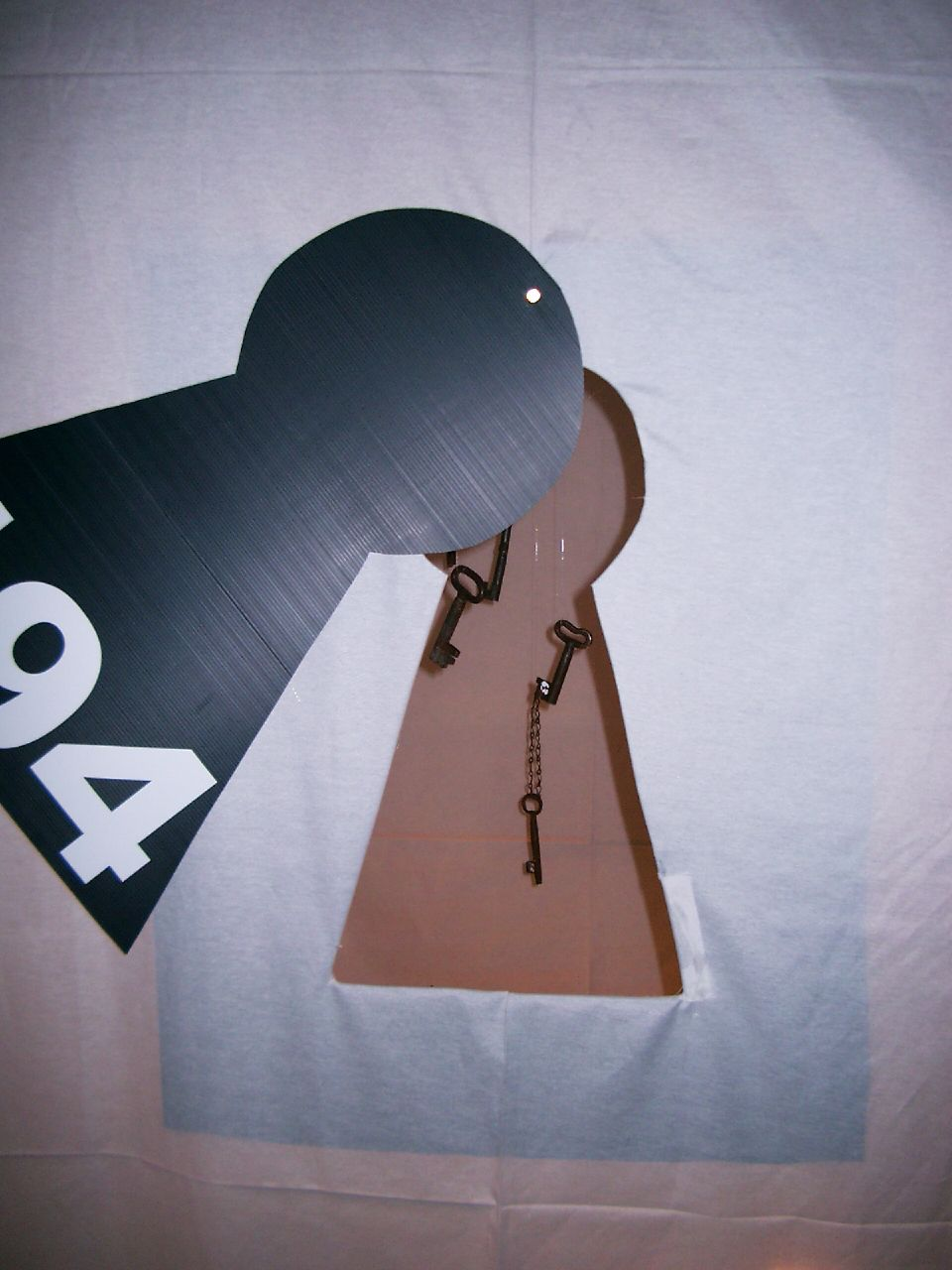
Palestinian art to symbolize United Nations General Assembly Resolution 194

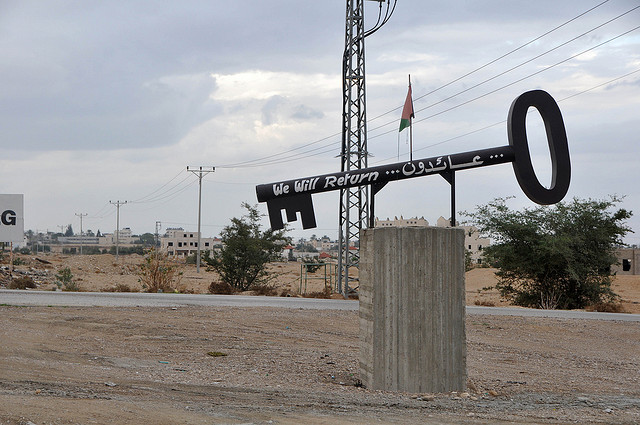
Outside Jericho, with the words "We will return..."

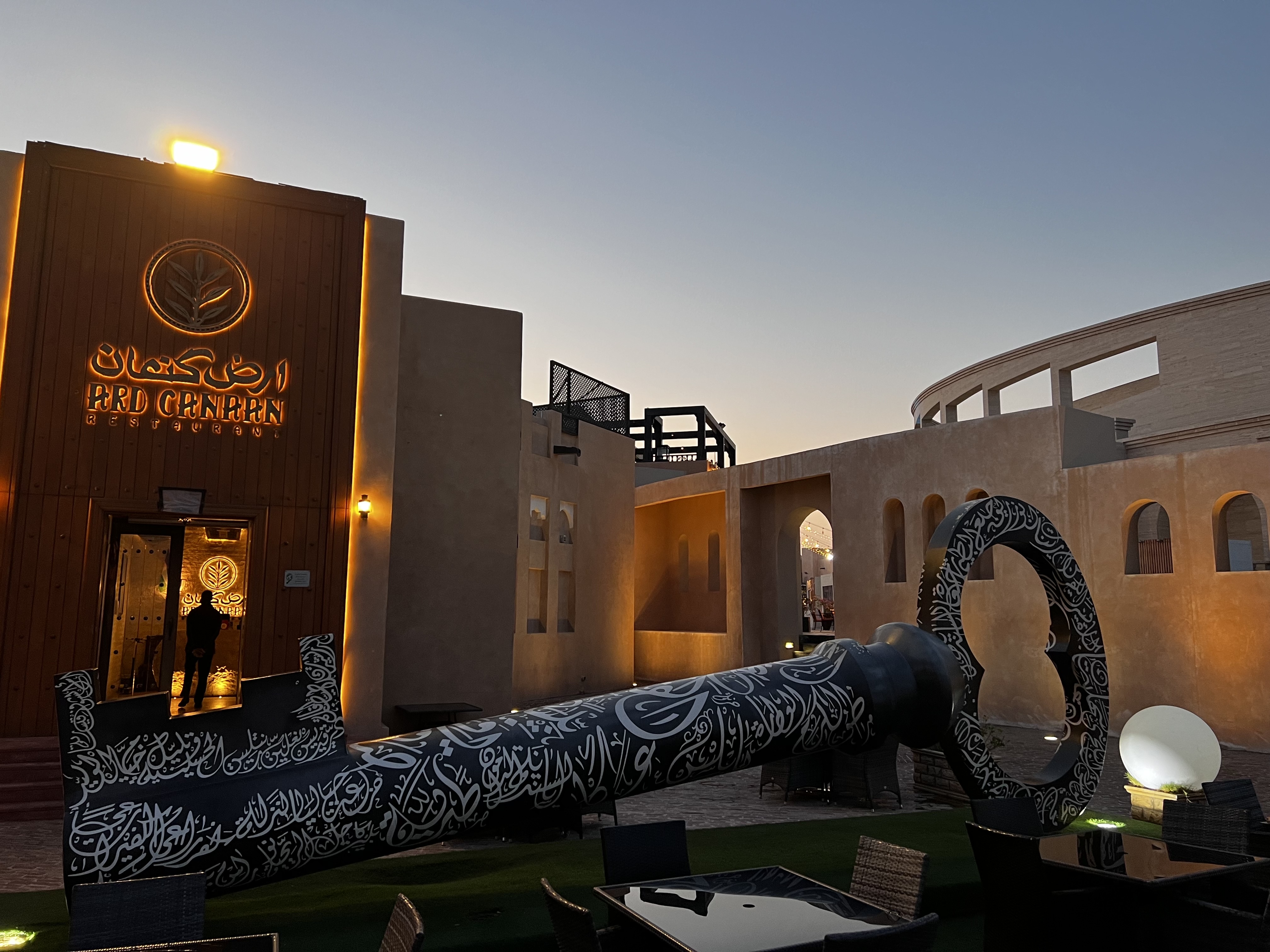
A large Palestinian key representing the Nakba, in Katara, Doha, Qatar

== See also ==
- List of national symbols of Palestine
