= List of national symbols of Palestine =

The flag of Palestine, symbol of Palestinian identity and the Palestinian state

The symbols of Palestine include official and unofficial flags, icons or adopted cultural expressions that may be emblematic, representative or otherwise characteristic of Palestine and of its culture.

The scope of what is included in the symbols of Palestine includes the state flag and its ensign based on the Flag of the Arab Revolt. It also includes Palestinian vexillology and signs used by the Palestinian National Authority. The fida'i is its national anthem. In 2015, the Palestinian Authority adopted the Palestine sunbird as the national bird of the State of Palestine. The Palestinian Authority passport has been described as a 'crucial symbol of nationhood.' Postage stamps and postal history of the Palestinian National Authority also constitute a national symbol. The list of foundational symbols of Palestinian identity include:

- Al Aqsa (compound), particularly the Dome of the Rock
- Handala
- the Palestinian key
- the Palestinian keffiyeh made famous by Yasser Arafat
- the watermelon

Among the additional objects which are considered to be symbols of the Palestinian nation, is the native Palestinian poppy, Anemone coronaria. Even though the national flower of Palestine is the Faqqua Iris, adopted in 2016, the poppy has red petals, a black center with a white ring around it, and green leaves, evoking the colors of the Pan-Arabic and Palestinian flag. Jaffa oranges, lemons, olive trees, Battiri eggplants and the cactus pear (sabr) are also widely used as symbols for the Palestinian nation. Other plants including za'atar (thyme) and handal (colocynth) and traditional Palestinian crafts such as tatreez (Palestinian embroidery) are also considered national symbols. Maqluba is used a national symbol at pro-Palestine protests.

== Gallery ==
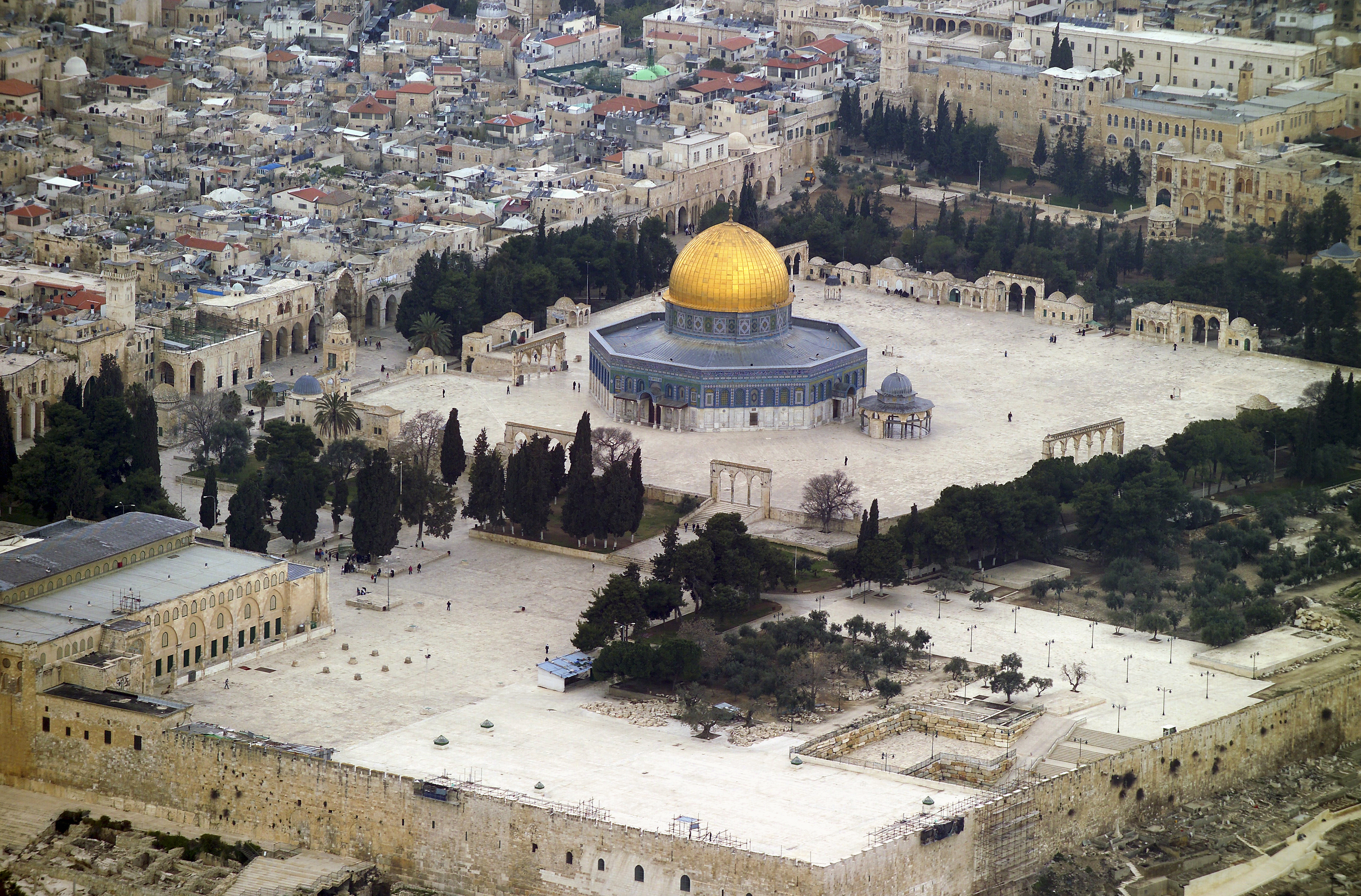
Al Aqsa

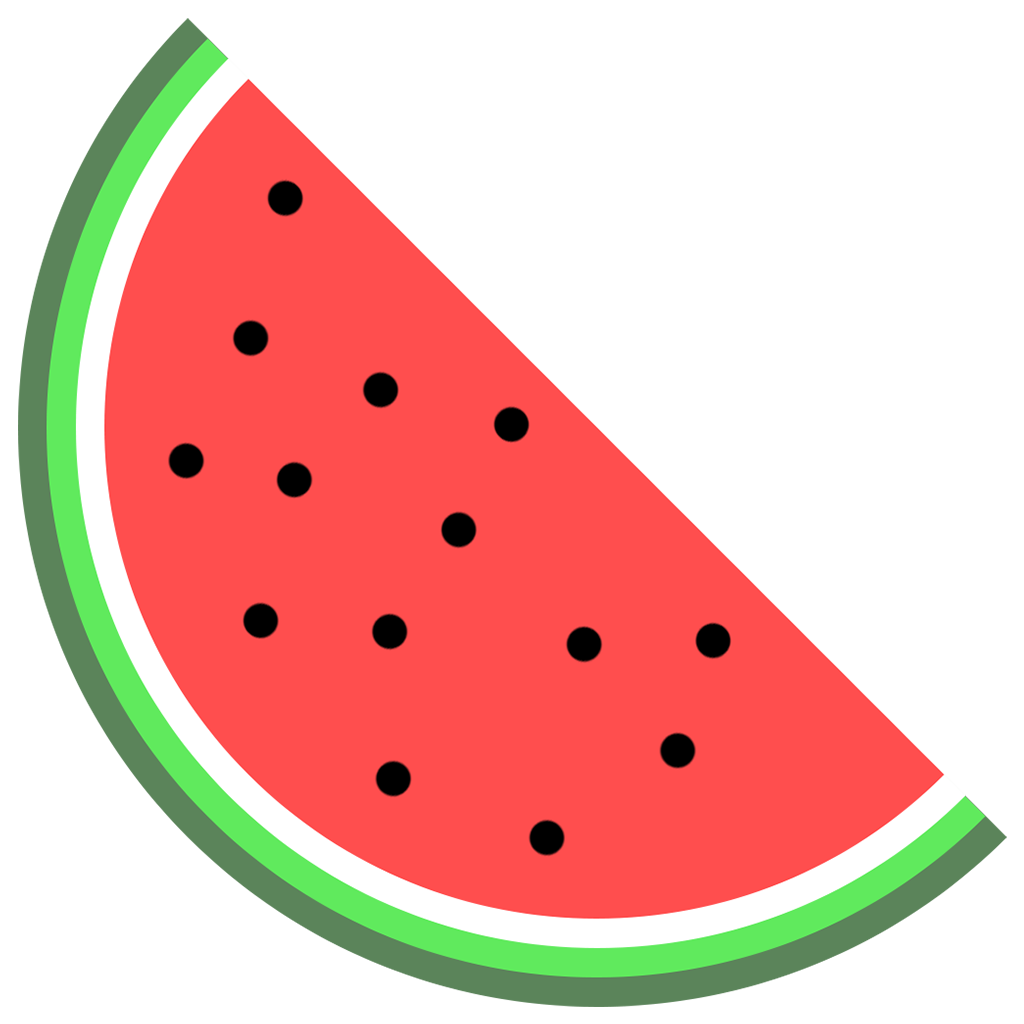
Watermelon

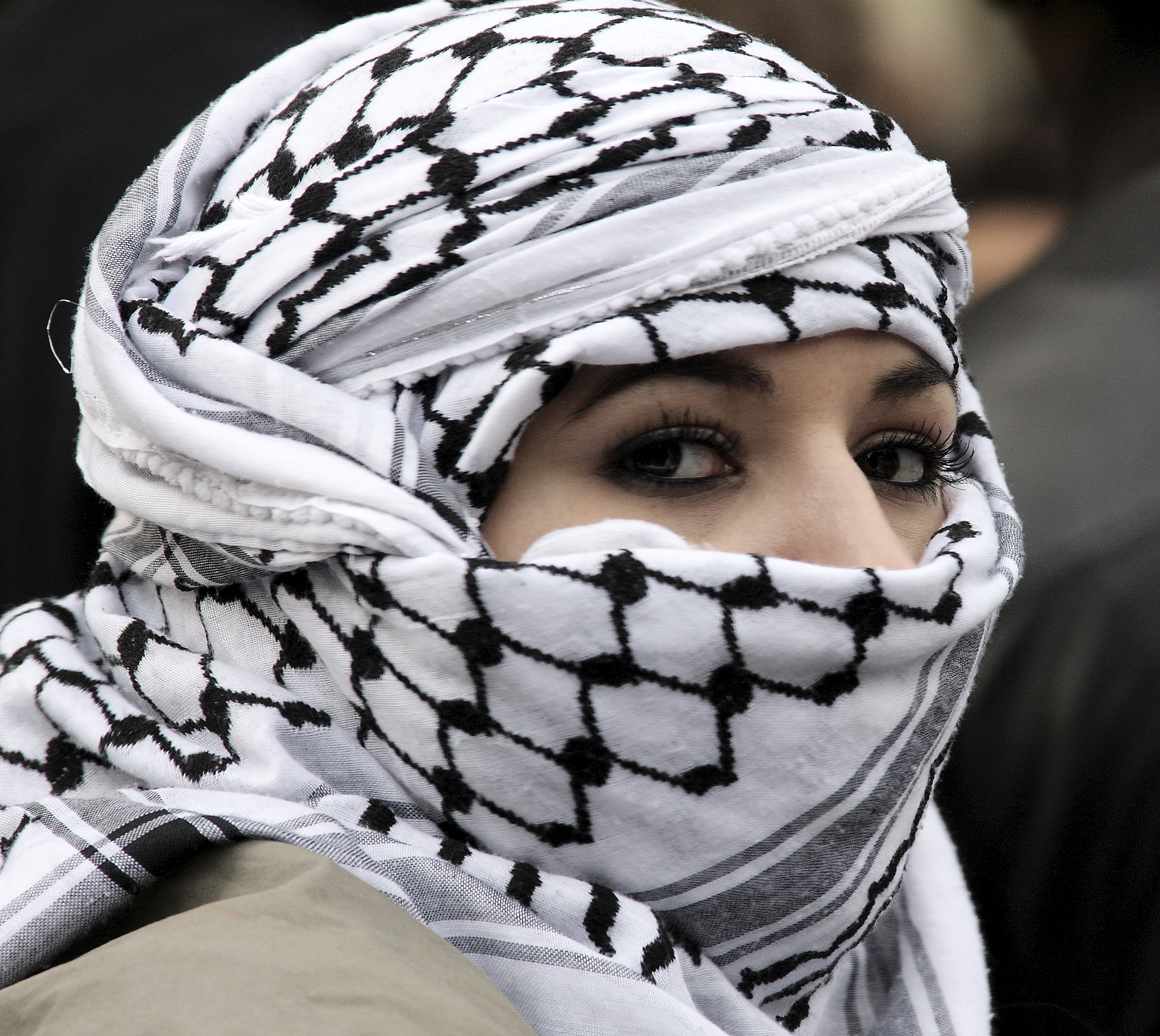
Keffiyeh

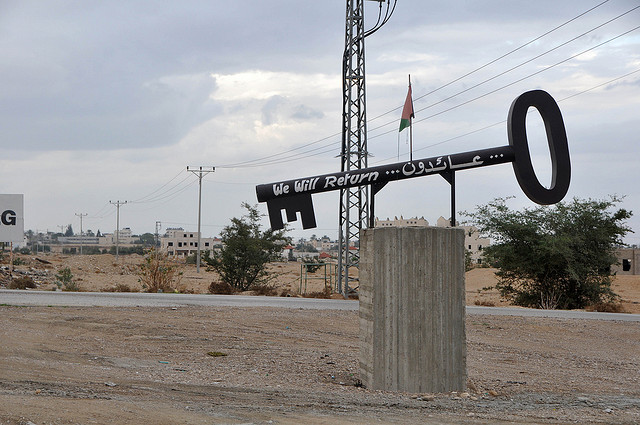
Key

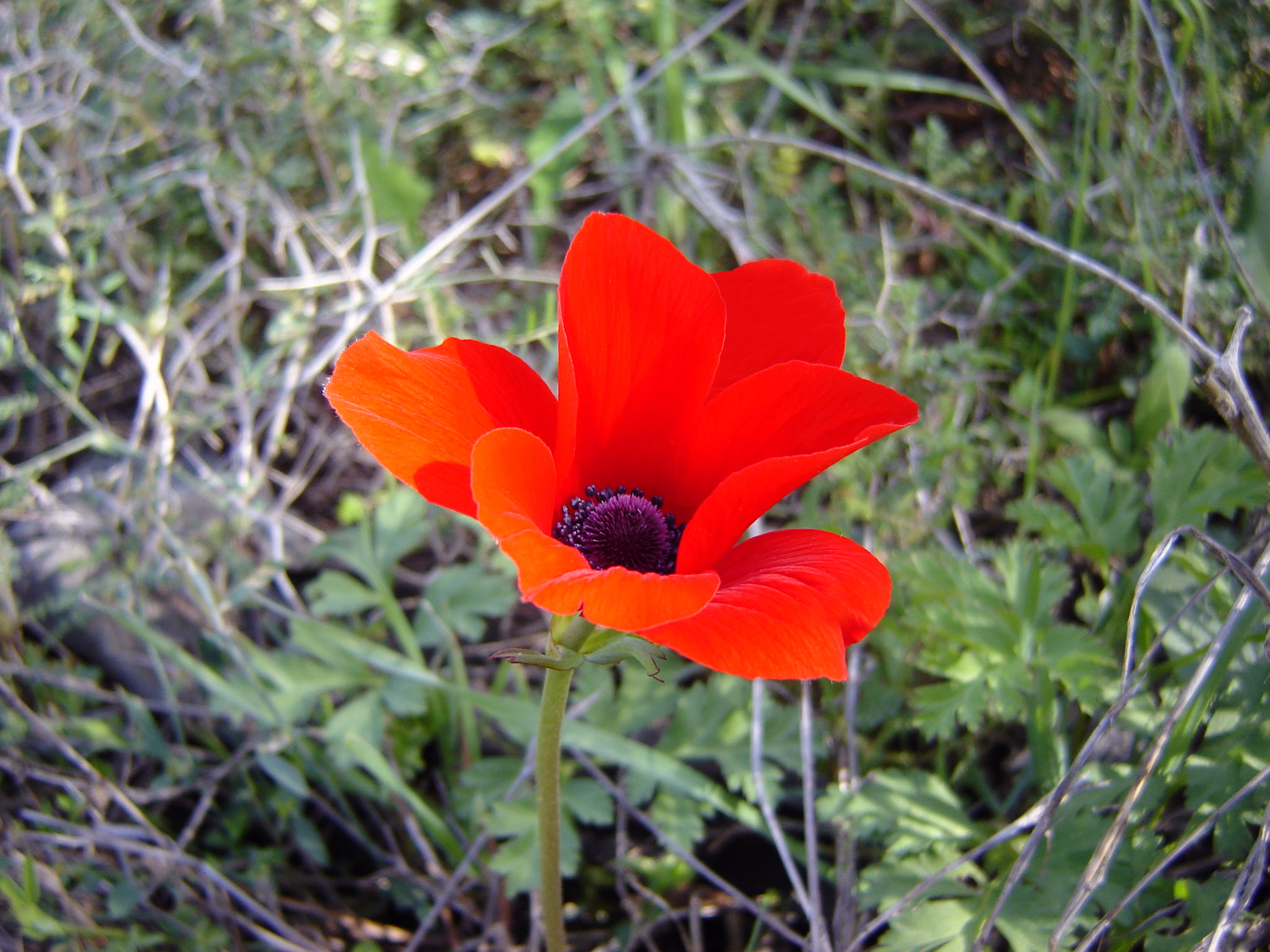
Poppy

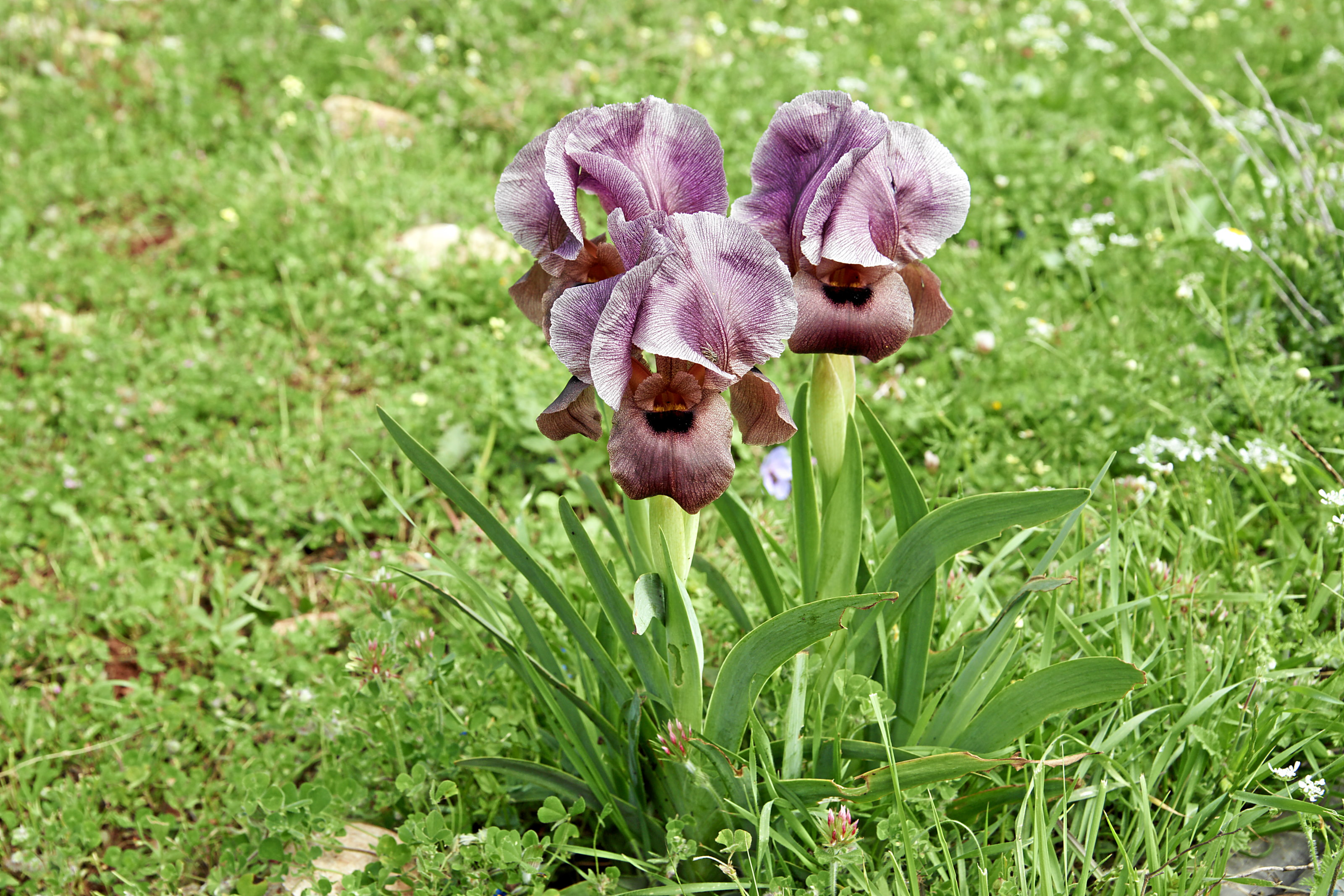
Faqqua Iris

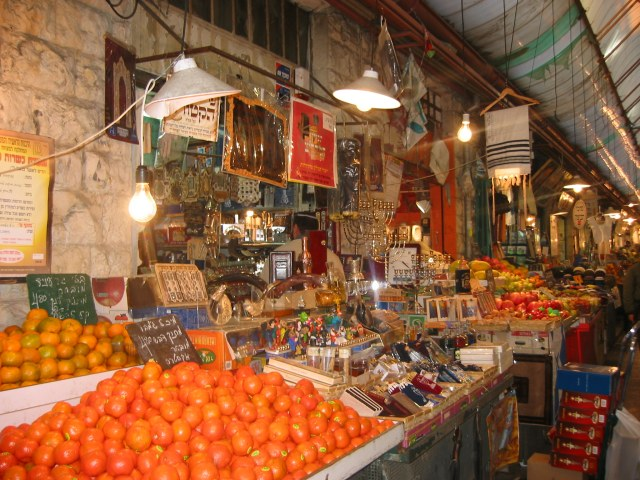
Jaffa oranges

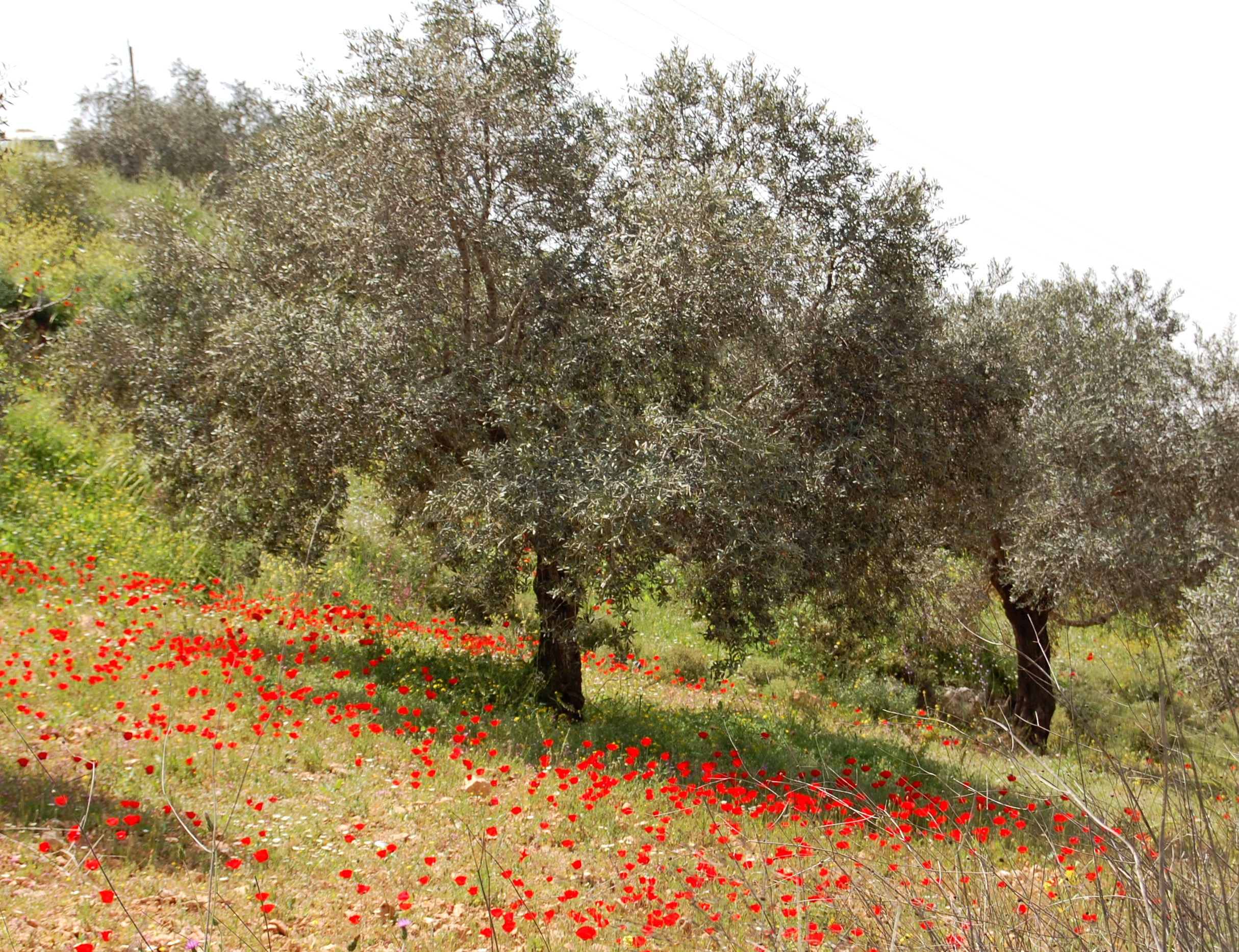
Olive tree

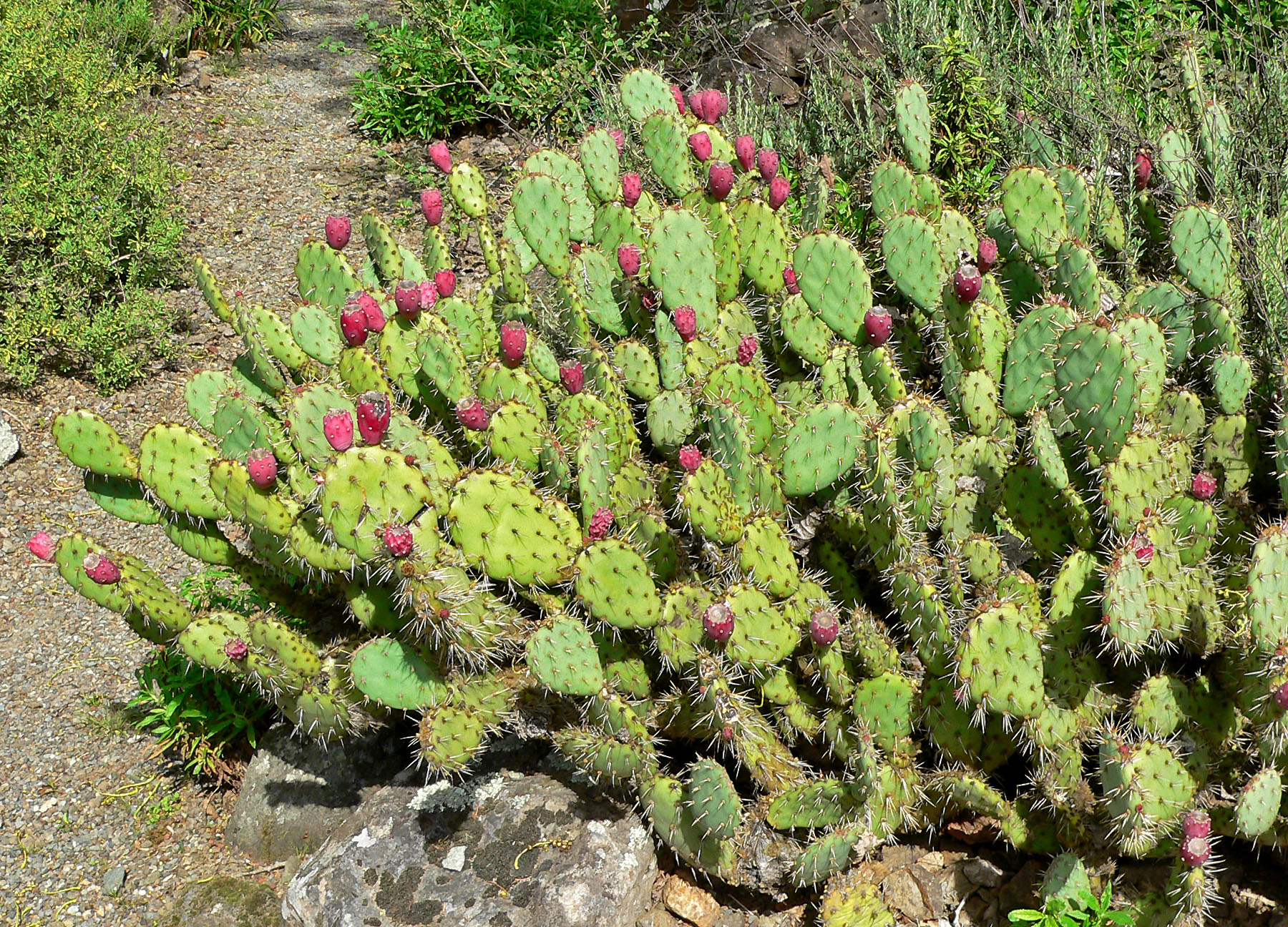
Prickly pear cactus

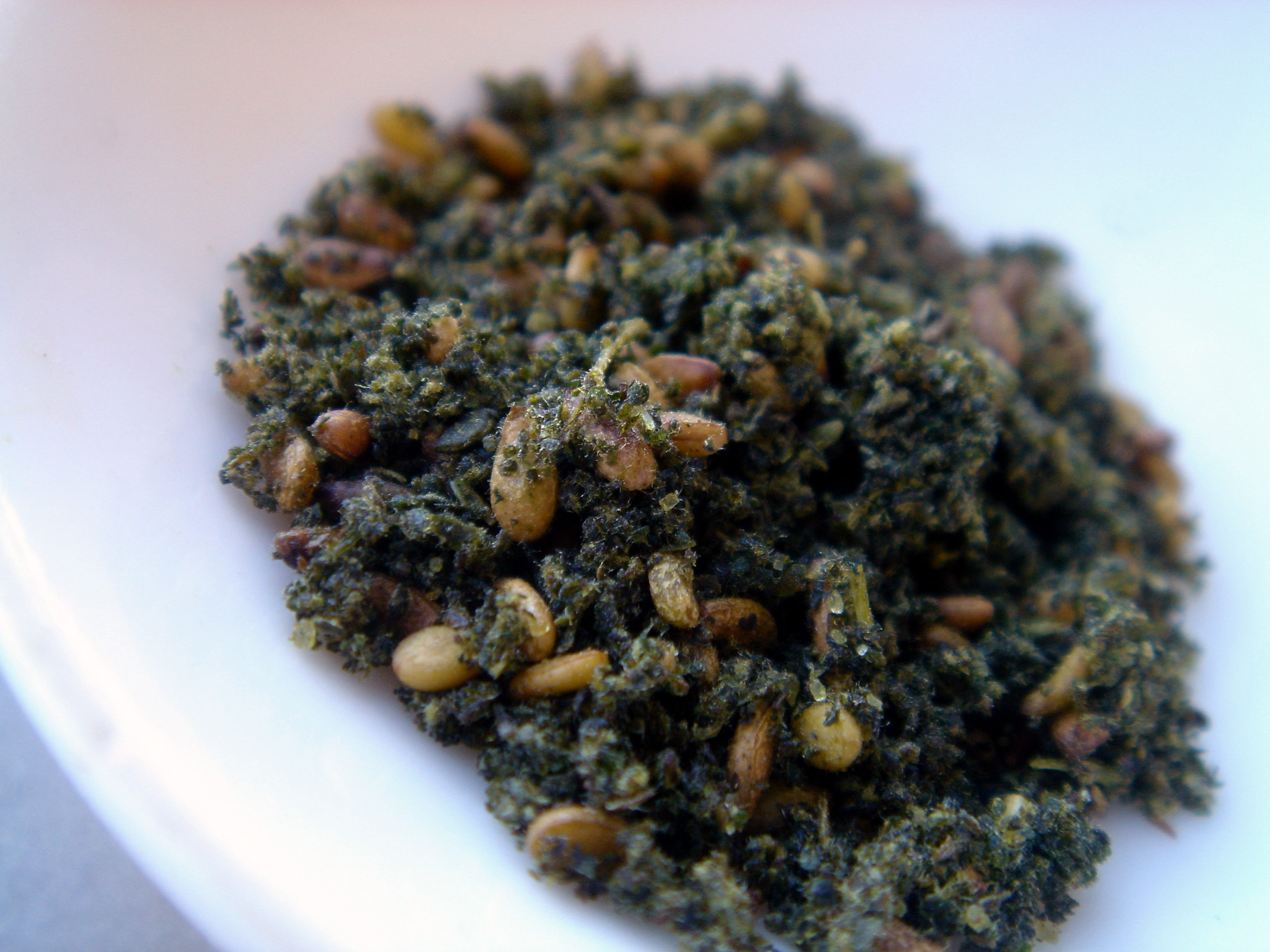
Za’atar

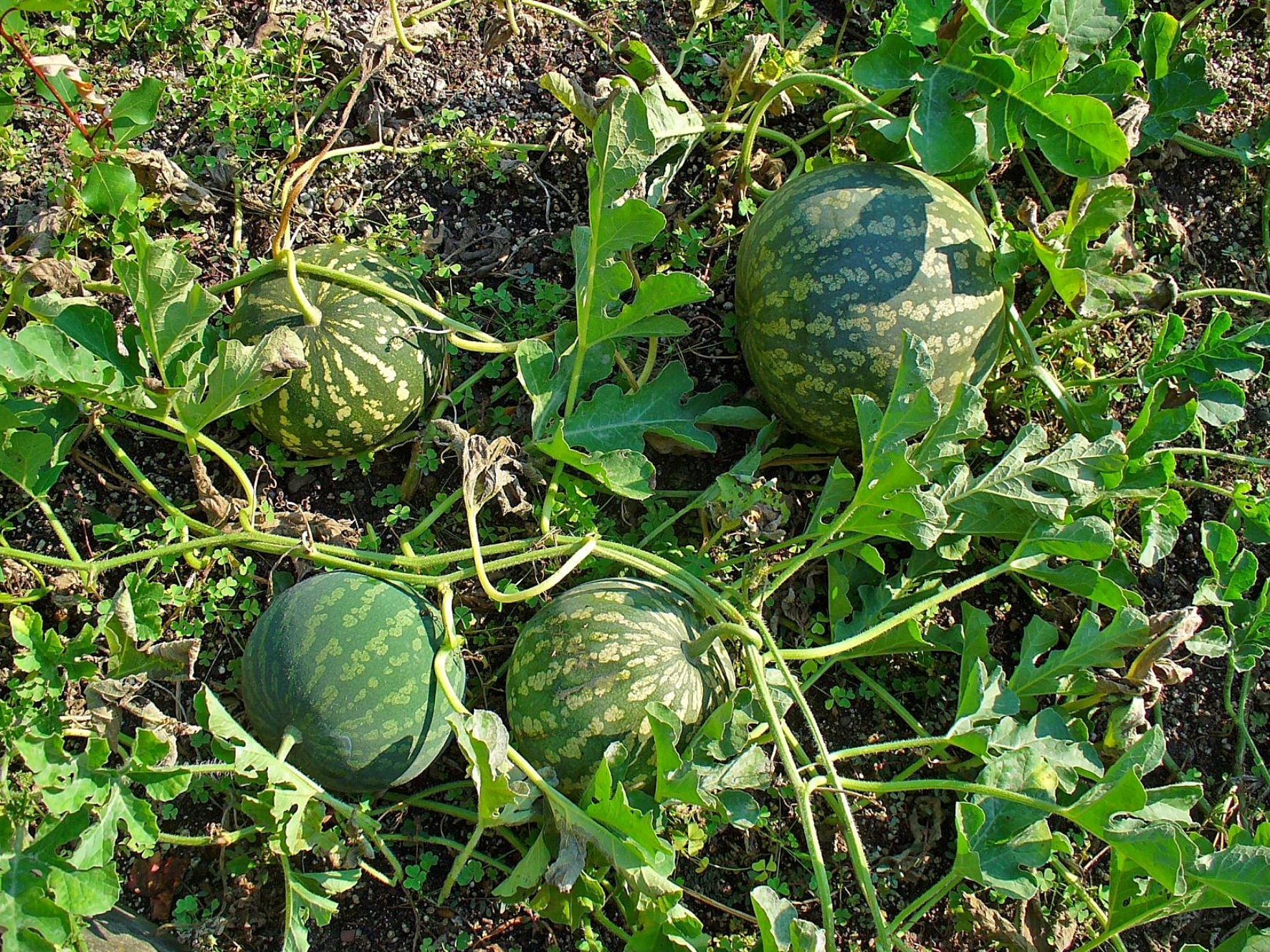
Handal

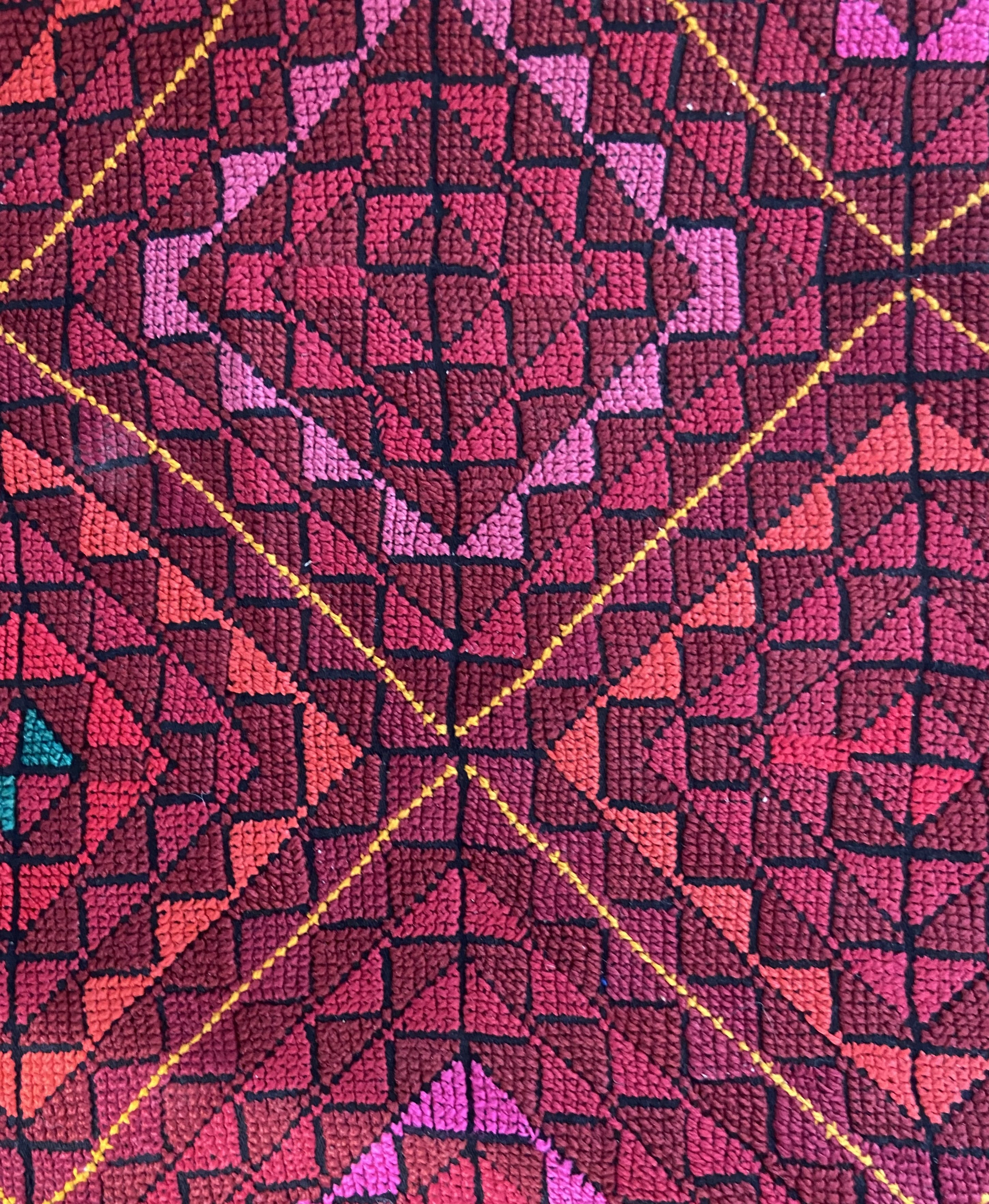
Tatreez

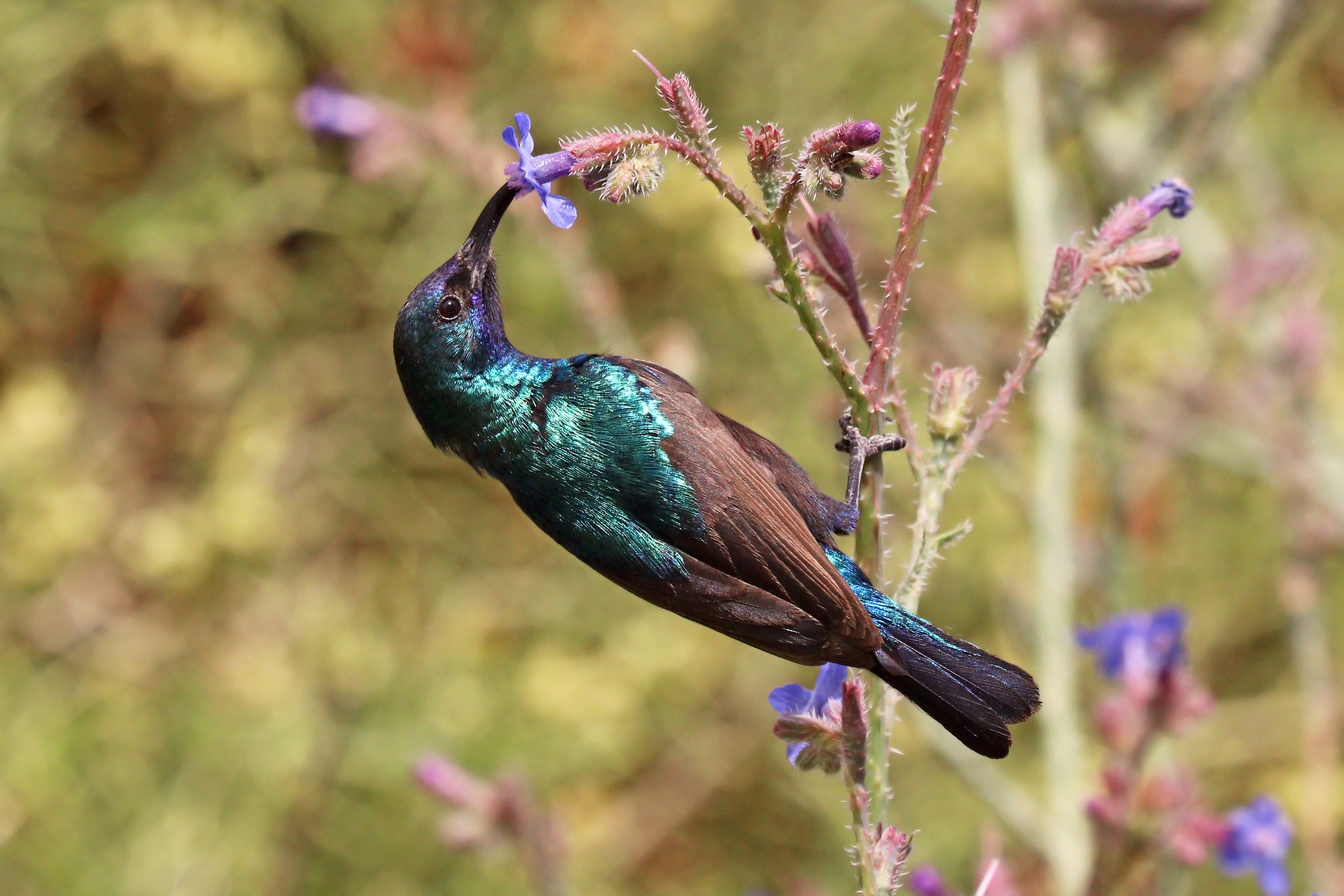
Palestine sunbird

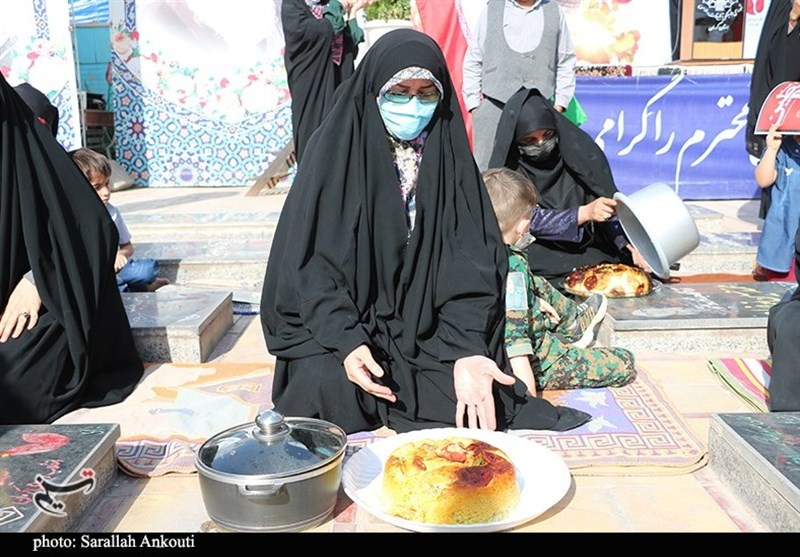
Maqluba
