= Masthead (American publishing) =

List of details on a publication

In American usage, a publication's masthead is a printed list, published in a fixed position in each edition, of its owners, departments, officers, contributors and address details, which in British English usage is known as imprint. Flannel panel is a humorous term for a magazine masthead panel.

In the UK and many other Commonwealth nations, "the masthead" is a publication's designed title as it appears on the front page: what, in American English, is known as the nameplate or "flag".

== See also ==
- Colophon (publishing)
- Impressum
- Indicia (publishing)
