= Palestinian keffiyeh =

Black and white scarf

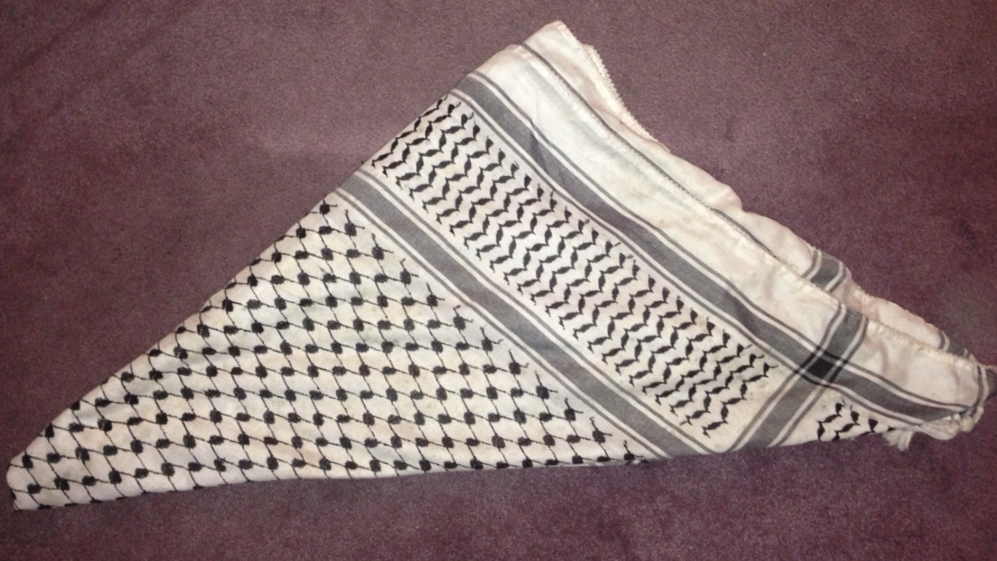
The Palestinian version of the keffiyeh

The Palestinian keffiyeh (Arabic: كوفية, romanized: kūfiyya) is a distinctly patterned black-and-white keffiyeh.

White keffiyehs had been traditionally worn by Palestinian peasants and bedouins to protect from the sun, when Palestine was part of the Ottoman Empire. Its use as a symbol of Palestinian nationalism and resistance dates back to the 1936–1939 Arab revolt in Palestine, which saw its wider use by more sections of Palestinian society.

Outside of the Middle East and North Africa, the keffiyeh first gained popularity among pro-Palestinian activists. It is widely considered to be an icon of solidarity with the Palestinians in the Israeli–Palestinian conflict.

== History ==
=== Ottoman period ===
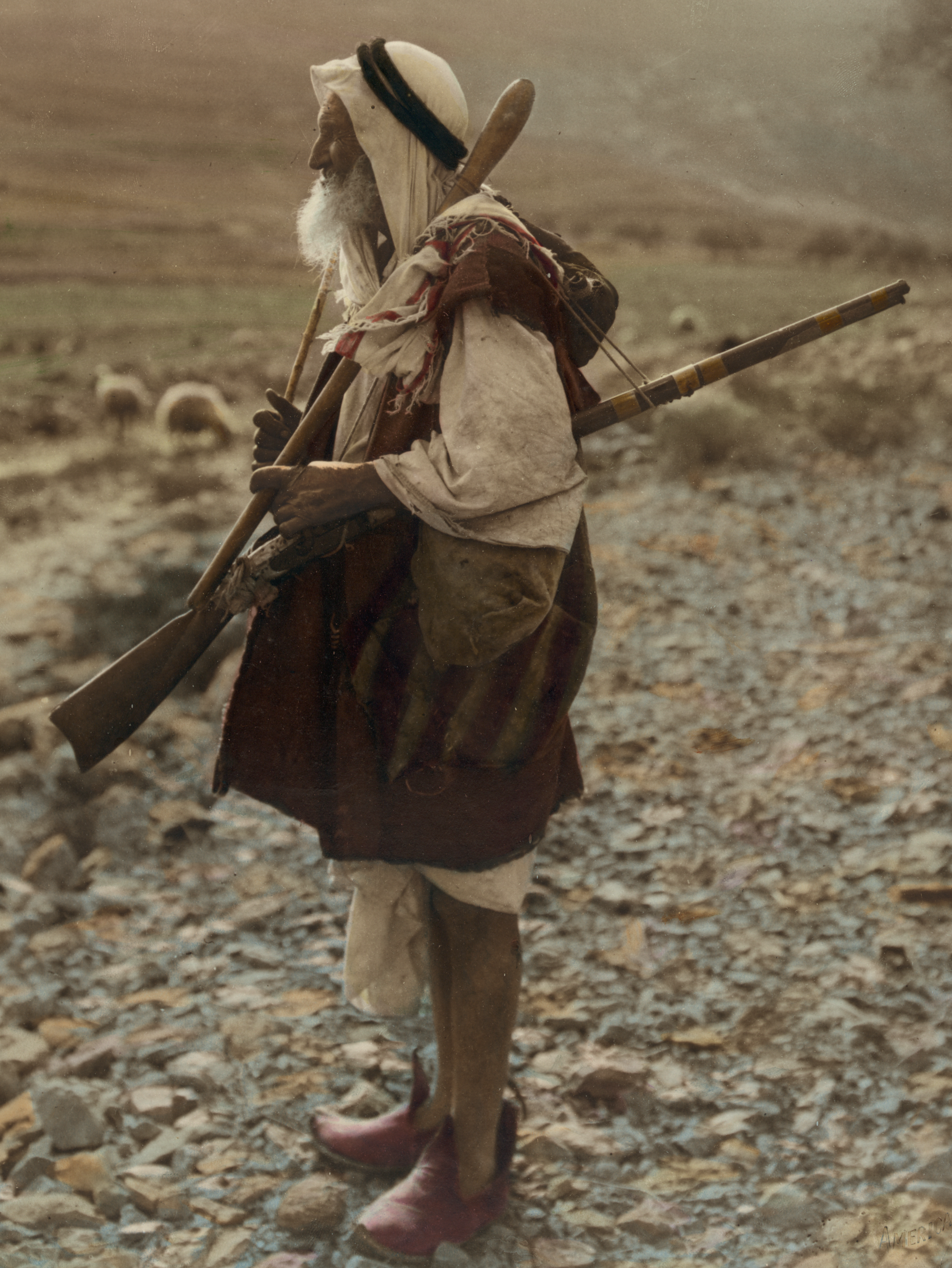
Palestinian shepherd wearing a white keffiyeh near Jerusalem, 1919

Traditionally worn by Palestinian farmers, during the Ottoman period the keffiyeh signalled that the wearer was rural, in contrast to the tarboosh worn by the urban classes.

=== Mandatory Palestine ===
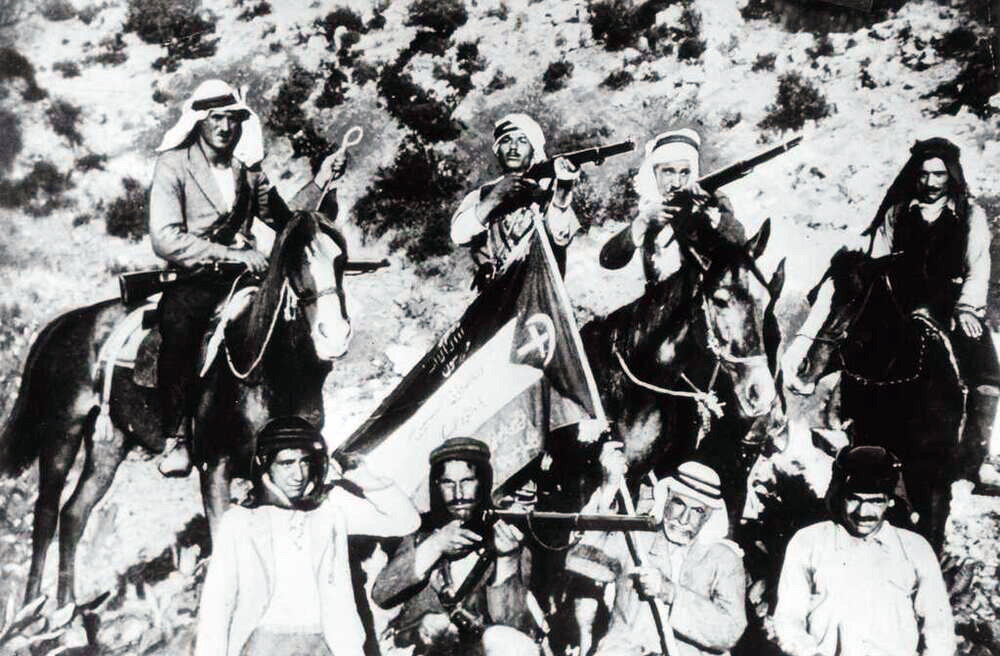
Palestinian rebels wearing white keffitehs, posing with their rifles and a Palestinian Arab flag emblazoned with a cross and crescent, 1937

Early Jewish migrants to Mandatory Palestine adopted the keffiyeh because they saw it as part of the authentic local lifestyle.

The white keffiyeh worn by Palestinian men of any rank, became a symbol of Palestinian nationalism during the Arab Revolt of the 1930s. This reached a peak in 1938, when the leadership of the revolt ordered that the urban classes replace their traditional tarbush hats with the keffiyeh. The move was intended to create unity, as well as allow the rebels to blend in when they entered the cities.

=== Post-1948 ===
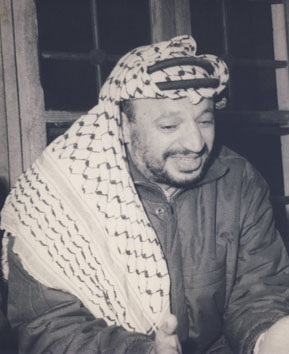
Palestinian political leader Yasser Arafat in his iconic fishnet-style black-and-white keffiyeh, 1974

Its prominence increased during the 1960s with the beginning of the Palestinian resistance movement and its adoption by Palestinian politician Yasser Arafat.

The black-and-white fishnet pattern keffiyeh would later become Arafat's symbol and he would rarely be seen without it; only occasionally would he wear a military cap, or, in colder climates, a Russian-style ushanka hat. Arafat would wear his keffiyeh in a semi-traditional way, wrapped around his head via an agal. He also wore a similarly patterned piece of cloth in the neckline of his military fatigues. Early on, he had made it his personal trademark to drape the scarf over his right shoulder only, arranging it in the rough shape of a triangle, to resemble the outlines of the territory claimed by Palestine. This way of wearing the keffiyeh became a symbol of Arafat as a person and political leader, and it has not been imitated by other Palestinian leaders.

Another Palestinian figure associated with the keffiyeh is Leila Khaled, a member of the armed wing of the Popular Front for the Liberation of Palestine. Several photographs of Khaled circulated in the Western newspapers after the hijacking of TWA Flight 840 and the Dawson's Field hijackings. These photos often included Khaled wearing a keffiyeh in the style of a Muslim woman's hijab, wrapped around the head and shoulders. The most famous of these images is a photograph taken by Pulitzer Prize winner Eddie Adams. The photographs brought publicity to the hijackings and rendered Khaled an iconic status within the broader Palestinian liberation movement as well as within leftist movements globally. This was unusual, as the keffiyeh is associated with Arab masculinity, and many believe this to be something of a fashion statement by Khaled, denoting her equality with men in the Palestinian resistance.

The colors of the stitching in a keffiyeh are also somewhat associated with Palestinians' political sympathies. Traditional black and white keffiyehs became associated with Fatah. In 2021, clashes broke out at Al-Azhar University after Hamas security forces demanded that students and staff members remove their black and white keffiyehs, an action that critics believe was motivated by the keffiyeh′s association with Fatah. This followed a similar incident in 2009 where security forces confiscated the keffiyehs of pro-Fatah student activists. Red and white keffiyehs were adopted by Palestinian Marxist groups, such as the Popular Front for the Liberation of Palestine (PFLP).

== Popularity with pro-Palestinian activists ==
In Europe and North America, keffiyehs are often worn by non-Palestinians as a political expression of solidarity with the Palestinian cause. While Western protesters wear differing styles and shades of keffiyeh, the most prominent is the black-and-white keffiyeh. This is typically worn around the neck like a neckerchief, simply knotted in the front with the fabric allowed to drape over the back. Other popular styles include rectangular-shaped scarves with the basic black-and-white pattern in the body, with the ends knitted in the form of the Palestinian flag. Since the Al-Aqsa Intifada, these rectangular scarves have increasingly appeared with a combination of the Palestinian flag and Al-Aqsa printed on the ends of the fabric.

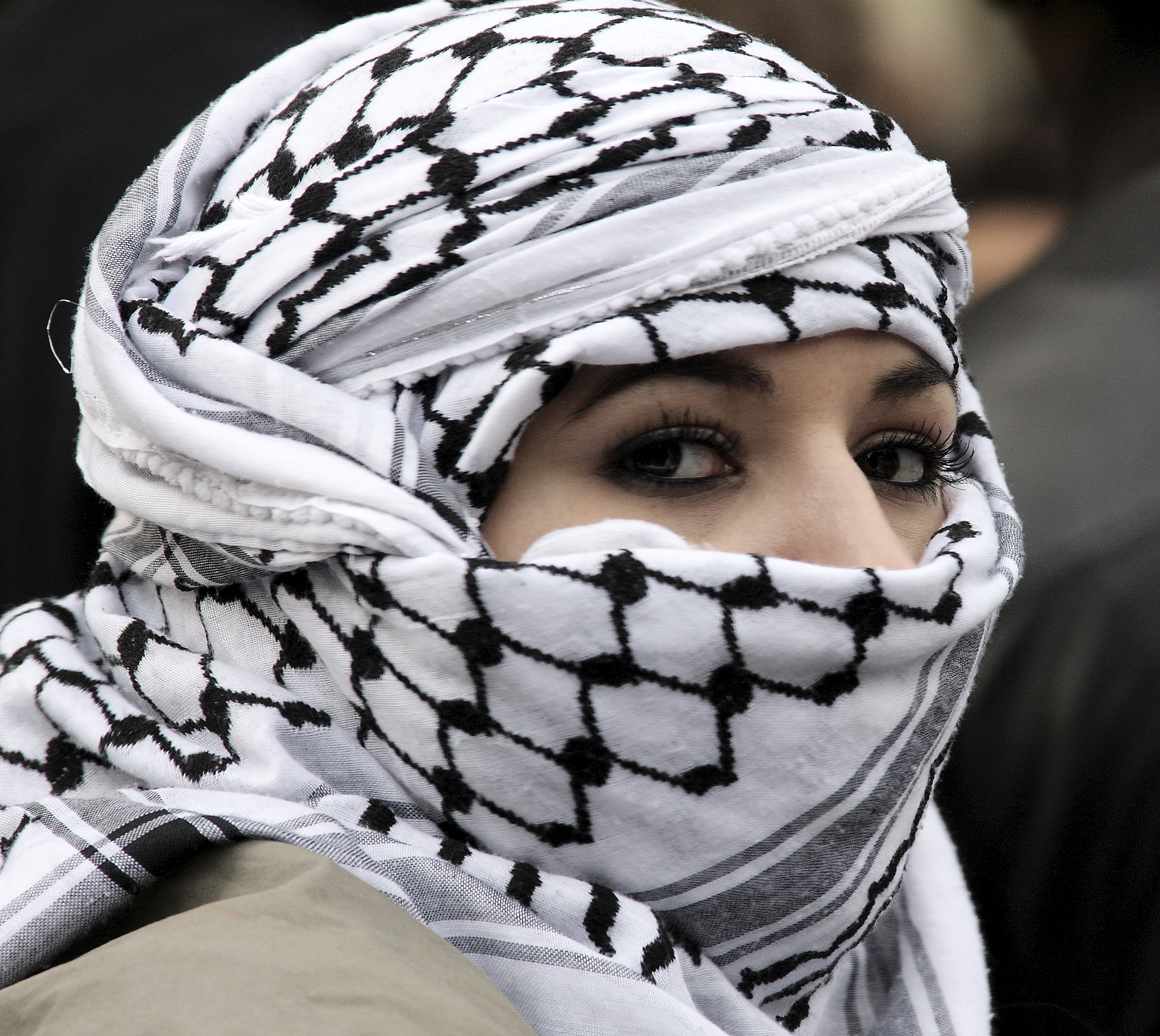
A woman wearing the Palestinian fishnet-style keffiyeh in Paris, France, 2010

In 2006, the prime minister of Spain, José Luis Rodríguez Zapatero, gave a speech in which he criticized Israel harshly, then accepted a keffiyeh from members of the audience and had his photo taken wearing it.

In September 2025, Colombian President Gustavo Petro appeared in New York City's Times Square wearing a Palestinian keffiyeh around his neck in a pro-Palestinian demonstration. The event happened during his visit to attend the United Nations General Assembly. Petro used a megaphone to address the crowd, saying "we need a powerful army of countries who do not accept genocide" and urging U.S. soldiers to disobey the orders of Trump and instead "obey the orders of humanity". The U.S. State Department responded hours later by revoking his visa, citing "reckless and incendiary actions".

The keffiyeh print has been used many times in fashion by brands such as Topshop, ASOS, Cecilie Copenhagen, Boohoo or the Israeli brand Dodo Bar Or, bringing controversy and debates about cultural appropriation.

In 2007, the American clothing store chain Urban Outfitters stopped selling keffiyehs after a user on the Jewish blog Jewschool criticized the retailer for labelling the item as an "anti-war woven scarf". The action led to the retailer withdrawing the product.

=== Appropriation ===
In 2011, British-Palestinian hip-hop rapper Shadia Mansour denounced cultural appropriation of the keffiyeh, defending it as a symbol of Palestinian solidarity, in her first single, "al-Kūfīyah 'Arabīyah" ("The keffiyeh is Arab"). She performs wearing a traditional Palestinian thawb and proclaims in her song: "This is how we wear the keffiyeh/The Arab keffiyeh" and "I'm like the keffiyeh/However you rock me/Wherever you leave me/I stay true to my origins/Palestinian." On-stage in New York, she introduced the song by saying, "You can take my falafel and hummus, but don't fucking touch my keffiyeh."

== Symbolism ==
The patterns on the Palestinian keffiyeh symbolize various themes:

- Olive leaves: Strength, resilience, perseverance.
- Fishnet: Connection between Palestinian sailors and the Mediterranean Sea.
- Bold lines: Trade routes going through Palestine, including the Silk Road.

== Production ==
Palestinian keffiyehs are now largely imported from China. With the scarf's growing popularity in the 2000s, Chinese manufacturers entered the market, driving Palestinians out of the business. For five decades, Yasser Hirbawi had been the only Palestinian manufacturer of keffiyehs, making them across 16 looms at the Hirbawi Textile Factory in Hebron. In 1990, all 16 of the looms were functioning, making around 750 keffiyehs per day. By 2010, only two looms were used, making a 300 keffiyehs per week. Unlike the Chinese-manufactured ones, Hirbawi uses cotton only. Hirbawi's son Izzat stated the importance of creating the Palestinian symbol in Palestine: "the keffiyeh is a tradition of Palestine and it should be made in Palestine. We should be the ones making it." Following the 2023 Gaza war, demand has doubled; it could not be met, because Hirbawi has a monthly production of 5,000.

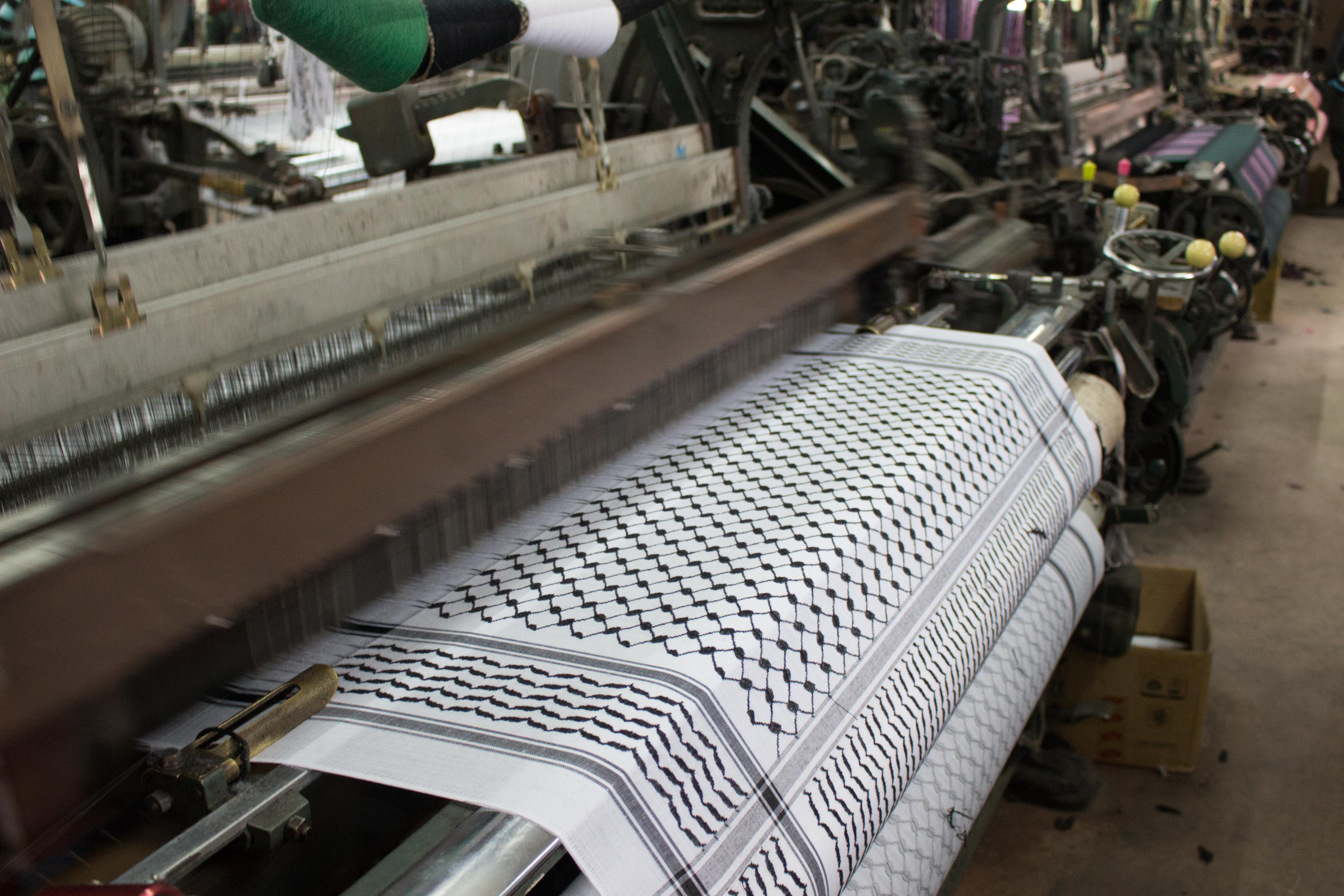
A loom at work making a Palestinian keffiyeh at the Hirbawi factory in Hebron, 2015

== See also ==
- List of Palestinian national symbols
- Palestinian culture
