= Ghassan Hage =

Lebanese-Australian anthropologist

- Born: 1957 (age 68–69); Beirut, Lebanon

Academic background
- Education: Macquarie University, University of Nice
- Influences: Pierre Bourdieu

Academic work
- Discipline: Anthropology
- Main interests: Multiculturalism, nationalism, racism

Ghassan J. Hage (born 1957) is a Lebanese-Australian academic who was a Future Generation Professor of Anthropology at the University of Melbourne until late 2025. He has held a number of visiting professorships, including at the American University of Beirut, University of Nanterre – Paris X, the University of Copenhagen, Manchester and Harvard. He has published several books on immigration, race and refugees in Australia.

== Early life ==
Hage grew up in Beirut, Lebanon, in a Maronite Catholic family. He moved to Sydney in 1976, aged 19. Hage's maternal grandparents are of Lebanese background, but had migrated to Australia from Santo Domingo in the 1930s. His mother, born in Santo Domingo, was an Australian citizen and thirty years old when she moved to Lebanon and married Hage's father, Lt Colonel Hamid Hage. After their marriage they lived in Baabda, near Beirut, where Hage was born.

== Education ==
Hage completed his schooling in Lebanon. He obtained his Baccalaureat 2eme Partie as a student of the International College (section française). Hage had enrolled at the American University of Beirut as a pre-med student when the Lebanese civil war (1975–90) erupted. He left Lebanon in 1976 and joined the maternal side of the family in Australia. He completed a Bachelor of Arts (Hons) at Macquarie University in 1982, a Diplome de 3eme Cycle (University of Nice, 1983) and a PhD in anthropology ("a study of communal identification among Christian Lebanese during the Lebanese civil war" - Macquarie University, 1989).

== Academic career ==
Hage works on the comparative anthropology of racism, nationalism and multiculturalism, particularly in Australia and the Middle East. He has written and conducted fieldwork on the Lebanese transnational diaspora in Australia, the US, Europe, Canada and Venezuela. He also researches and writes in social theory, particularly the work of Pierre Bourdieu.

He has been a contributor to debates on multiculturalism in Australia and has published on the topic. His book, White Nation, draws on theory from Whiteness studies, Jacques Lacan and Pierre Bourdieu to interpret ethnographic work undertaken in Australia. The book has been widely debated in Australia, with many of its themes picked up by anti-racism activists in other countries. The follow-up Against Paranoid Nationalism is an analysis of certain themes in Australian politics that Hage believed were prominent under the government of John Howard.

He has also written on the political dimensions of critical anthropology (which appears in the volume Alter-Politics: Critical Thought and the Radical Imagination (Melbourne University Press 2015)). His writings include: Is Racism an Environmental Threat? which views racism and the domination of nature as originating from the same ideology, which Hage refers to as 'domestication': "a mode of feeling at home in the world by dominating it". Hage's most recent book, The Diasporic Condition: Ethnographic Explorations of the Lebanese in the World, is concerned with affirming the importance of a continuity between classical anthropological questions and the study of diasporic culture.

From 1987 he was a part-time lecturer at the University of Technology Sydney, then until 1994 a lecturer in Social Sciences at the University of Western Sydney. He was at the University of Sydney from 1994 to 2008 before moving to the University of Melbourne. He has also held a post-doctoral research position and a visiting professorship at Pierre Bourdieu's research centre in Paris at the Ecole des Hautes Etudes en Sciences Sociales which has been of particular importance in his intellectual formation.

In 2023-2024 Hage was a visiting professor at the Max Planck Institute of Social Anthropology in Halle (Saale), Germany. On 7 February 2024, Hage was sacked by the Max Planck Society due to his comments on the Gaza war. On 7 October 2023, the day of the Hamas-led attack on Israel, Hage published a poem entitled "Israel-Palestine: The Endless Dead-End That Will Not End." The Max Planck Society published a press release, stating that social media posts made by Hage since the 2023 Hamas-led attack on Israel were incompatible with their core values. It said that "racism, anti-semitism, islamophobia, discrimination, hatred and agitation have no place in the Max Planck Society". Hage said that "What to me is a fair, intellectual critique of Israel, for them is “antisemitism according to the law in Germany".

Following the dismissal, global academic communities, including Israeli scholars, the German Association of Social and Cultural Anthropology, the British Society for Middle Eastern Studies, the European Association of Social Anthropologists, the American Anthropological Association, the Council for Humanities, Arts and Sciences and the Australian Anthropological Society rallied in support of Hage, urging the society to reverse its decision.

== Views on Israel/Palestine ==
Hage supports the Boycott, Divestment and Sanctions campaign against Israel.

Hage said that he would like to see Israel and Palestine exist as a "multi-religious society made from Christians, Muslims and Jews living together on that land". He said he has been critical of the Netanyahu government because it has "work[ed] against such a goal" and that he applies to same standard to Palestinian organisations which reject co-existence.

== Personal life ==
Hage divides his time between Sydney, Beirut and Europe.

Hage is deaf. His hearing declined considerably in the 1980s and 1990s. He has had one cochlear implant fitted in 2004 and another in 2012.

== Memberships and awards ==
- Fellow of the Australian Academy of the Social Sciences
- Fellow of the Australian Academy of the Humanities
- Fellow of the British Academy of the Social Sciences
- Past President of the Australian Anthropological Society
- 2004 winner, Community Relations Commission Award, New South Wales Premier's Literary Awards, for Against Paranoid nationalism.

== Selected publications ==
- Hage, G. (2023), The Racial Politics of Australian Multiculturalism: White Nation, Against Paranoid Nationalism & Later Writings. Sydney: Sweatshop (ISBN 9780645717990)
- Hage, G. (2021), The Diasporic Condition: Ethnographic Explorations of the Lebanese in the World. Chicago: University of Chicago Press (ISBN 9780226547060)
- Hage, G. (ed.) (2021), Decay. New York and London: Duke University Press (ISBN 9781478014737)
- Hage, G. (2021), L'Alterpolitique: anthropologie critique et imaginaire radical. Toulouse: EuroPhilosophie Éditions (ISBN 9791095990239)
- Hage, G. (2017), Is Racism an Environmental Threat? Cambridge: Polity Press (ISBN 978-0-7456-9226-5)
- Hage, G. (2017). Le Loup et le Musulman. Paris: Wildproject. (ISBN 2918490679)
- Hage, G. (2015), Alter-Politics: Critical anthropology and the Radical Imagination. Carlton: Melbourne University Press.
- Hage, G. and R. Eckersley (eds.) 2012. Responsibility. Carlton South, Vic.: Melbourne University Press.
- Hage, G. and E. Kowal (eds.) (2011) Force, Movement, Intensity: The Newtonian Imagination in the Social Sciences, Carlton South, Vic.: Melbourne University Press (ISBN 978-0-522-86081-8)
- Hage, G (2009) Waiting. Carlton South, Vic.: Melbourne University Press (ISBN 978-0-522-85693-4)
- Hage, G., Worpole K, and Scruton R. (2004). What Would You Die For?. The British Council.
- Hage, G (2003) Against Paranoid Nationalism: searching for hope in a shrinking society, Annandale, NSW: Pluto Press (ISBN 1864031964)
- Hage, G (Ed) (2002) Arab-Australians today: citizenship and belonging, Carlton: Melbourne University Press (ISBN 0522849792)
- Hage, G (2000) White Nation: fantasies of White supremacy in a multicultural society, New York: Routledge (ISBN 1-86403-056-9)
- Hage, G and Couch, R (Eds) (1999) The future of Australian multiculturalism: reflections on the twentieth anniversary of Jean Martin's The Migrant Presence, Sydney, N.S.W.: Research Institute for Humanities and Social Sciences, University of Sydney (ISBN 0-9585973-1-6)
- Hage, G, with Grace, H, Johnson, L, Langworth, J, and Symonds, M. (1997) Home/World: Space, community and marginality in Sydney's west, Annandale: Pluto Press.
