= Schirrmacher =

Schirrmacher is a surname. Notable people with the surname include:

- Christine Schirrmacher (born 1962), German Professor for Islamic Studies
- Frank Schirrmacher (1959–2014), German journalist and co-editor of the Frankfurter Allgemeine Zeitung
- Friedrich Wilhelm Schirrmacher (1824–1904), German historian
- Thomas Schirrmacher (born 1960), German theologian
