= Martin Bucer Seminary =

European multinational evangelical theological seminary and research institute

- Motto: For the perfecting of the saints, for the work of the ministry, for the edifying of the body of Christ. (Eph 4:12)
- Type: Private
- Established: 1996
- President: Frank Hinkelmann
- Students: 350 (2017)
- Location: In Germany: Bonn, Berlin, Bielefeld, Munich, Pforzheim, Chemnitz, and Hamburg, in Finland: Helsinki, in Brazil: São Paulo, in Switzerland: Zurich, in the Czech Republic: Prague, in Turkey: Istanbul and İzmir, in Albania: Tirana, in India: Delhi, and in Portugal: Lisbon
- Website: www.bucer.org

The Martin Bucer Seminary is a European multinational evangelical theological seminary and research institute in the Protestant reformed tradition. The seminary is named after the reformer Martin Bucer.

== History and education ==
The Martin Bucer Seminary was founded in 1996 in response to the dominance of higher criticism and liberal theology within German universities and seminaries. It offers students theological training in a network of campuses across German-speaking Europe (Germany and Switzerland, in partnership with the German Evangelical Alliance) as well as in the Czech Republic, in Albania, Brazil, Finland, India, Portugal, and Turkey.

A unique feature of the seminary are the many study centres with up to 20 students, who beside their academic training are interns in local churches. A further unique feature in the world of theological education is a combined curriculum for studies in a number of very different cultural settings of Christianity. The branches in growth oriented Christianity Brazil, minority oriented Christianity Turkey, a secularized Christianity in German speaking Western Europe and Czech Republic are combined into one global curriculum. Students can move around and get their credits at any of the study centers. They are taught by Christian professors and lecturers from other continents and contexts with often different perspectives, which especially challenges Western theology.

With 350 students in 2017 and an additional 450 students attending online courses, it is the largest Evangelical Seminary in Europe outside of the United Kingdom. The offered courses enable to receive a Bachelor of Theology and a Master of Theology, that are bestowed by different schools worldwide, most often by South African Theological Seminary (South Africa) and Whitefield Theological Seminary (USA). The seminary is no branch of such schools, but students earn credits there by proving which courses they have taken or papers they have written. President was until 2018 Thomas Schirrmacher. His successor is Frank Hinkelmann.

== Research ==
Martin Bucer Seminary also has a research arm that has published a wide range of texts and books focused on ethics, islamic studies, missiology, and religious freedom. Close connected to the Martin Bucer Seminary are several institutes of research as the International Institute for Religious Freedom, the Institute of Islamic Studies, the Institut für Lebens- und Familienwissenschaften or Hope.21. These institutes are networks of christian researchers from all over the world.

The seminary is member of the World Reformed Fellowship and connected to the Evangelical Alliance.

== Notable faculty ==
- Frank Hinkelmann, Lecturer for Church History
- Clair Davis, Lecturer for Church History
- Thomas K. Johnson, Lecturer for Philosophy of Religion and Ethics
- John Warwick Montgomery, Lecturer for Apologetics
- Christine Schirrmacher, Lecturer for Islamic Studies
- Thomas Schirrmacher, Lecturer for Systematic Theology, Missiology and Religious studies

== Publications ==
- Bonn Profiles (Press releases)
- MBS-Texte (Texts on Ethics, Philosophy and Theology)
- The WEA-Global-Issues-Series (Resources of the World Evangelical Alliance)
- International Journal for Religious Freedom
- Islam and Christianity
