= Paul Avis =

Anglican theologian

The Reverend Paul Avis
- Born: Paul David Loup Avis; 21 July 1947 (age 79); Walthamstow, England
- Spouse: Susan J. Haywood (m. 1970)

Scholarly background
- Education: University of London

Scholarly work
- Discipline: Theology
- Sub-discipline: Ecclesiology; practical theology; systematic theology
- Main interests: Anglican identity and ecclesiology; ecumenism

Ecclesiastical career
- Religion: Christianity (Anglican)
- Church: Free Church of England; Church of England
- Ordained: ? (Free Church presbyter); 1975 (Church of England deacon); 1976 (Church of England priest)

Paul David Loup Avis (/ˈeɪvɪs/; born 1947) is an English Anglican priest, theologian, and ecumenist. He was General Secretary of the Church of England's Council for Christian Unity from 1998 to 2011, theological consultant to the Anglican Communion Office, London, from 2011 to 2012, and Canon Theologian of Exeter Cathedral from 2008 to 2013. He was honorary professor in the Department of Theology and Religion at Durham University 2017–2021 and is currently Honorary Professor in the School of Divinity, University of Edinburgh (2022-). At the University of Exeter he was visiting professor of theology from 2009 to 2017 and subsequently honorary research fellow until 2021. He is the editor of the series Anglican-Episcopal Theology and History, published by Brill. Avis was also a chaplain to Queen Elizabeth II, 2008–2017.

== Biography ==
Avis was born on 21 July 1947 in Walthamstow. He studied theology at the University of London, where he obtained his Bachelor of Divinity degree in 1970 and his Doctor of Philosophy degree in 1976 with a thesis on the theology of Bishop Charles Gore, which was later published as Gore: Construction and Conflict (1988). On 11 July 1970, he married Susan Janet Haywood; they have three sons and two grandchildren.

After serving briefly as a presbyter in the Free Church of England, he was ordained deacon (1975) and priest (1976) in the Church of England's Diocese of Exeter. Avis served his title as assistant curate in the large team ministry of the South Molton Group of Parishes (1975–80), after which he became the vicar of the semi-rural, multi-parish benefice of Stoke Canon, Poltimore with Huxham, and Rewe with Netherexe, for eighteen years (1980–98). Avis served the wider diocese as Cathedral Prebendary (1993) and Sub-Dean (1997), and in 2008 he became the cathedral's and diocese's first Canon Theologian. He is also an honorary Assistant Priest in the Axminster Group of Parishes in which he lives (in East Devon, UK).

Since his first years as a parish priest, Avis has become a prolific writer of theological books and articles, especially related to the identity and ecclesiology of Anglicanism in historical and ecumenical perspective. In 2004 he founded the international peer-reviewed journal Ecclesiology, of which he is Editor in Chief.

Avis has been affiliated to the University of Exeter since the early 1980s until recently. He became an honorary Research Fellow of the Department of Theology in 1995 and honorary Professor of Theology in 2009. He set up the centre for the Study of the Christian Church, which organises ecumenical consultations and, until 2015, held the annual Richard Hooker Lectures at the Cathedral and at the University of St Mark and St John, Plymouth. The journal Ecclesiology, is published by Brill, in association with the Divinity School, University of Edinburgh, where Avis is an honorary professor.

In 1998 Avis was appointed Mary Tanner's successor in the key ecumenical position of General Secretary of the Council for Christian Unity, the Church of England's ecumenical study and advisory commission. He had already served on the Faith and Order Advisory Group (1990–98) and the Doctrine Commission (1989–95) of the Church of England, and has subsequently been a member of the Inter-Anglican Standing Commission on Ecumenical Relations (2000–08) and the successor body, the Inter-Anglican Standing Commission for Unity Faith and Order. He has also served on a couple of international ecumenical dialogues on behalf of the Anglican Communion.

The late Queen Elizabeth II appointed Avis as a member of the Royal College of Chaplains in 2008. He retired in 2017.

== Theology ==
According to Anglican theologian and former Archbishop of Canterbury Rowan Williams, "[a]mong contemporary theological voices, that of Paul Avis is always wide-ranging, constructive and sane, combining scholarship with a nuanced feel for tradition." Leaving aside his articles, Avis's books can be classified in three areas of theology: systematic, ecclesiological and practical-theological.

=== Systematic theology ===
Avis' first major excursion into systematic theology was The Methods of Modern Theology (1986), which analysed theological methodology in Friedrich Schleiermacher, Albrecht Ritschl, Karl Barth, Wolfhart Pannenberg, Paul Tillich, F.R.Tennant, Bernard Lonergan, and Karl Rahner. Although all his publications contain systematic theology, this is most obviously the case with God and the Creative Imagination. It is an instance of what Williams calls Avis's "wide-ranging" theological approach, that Avis took the burden of stepping back for a while from his theological specialisation to articulate his understanding of the basis of any theological enterprise, namely how we know God and God's revelation. According to Avis, the Christian understanding of God and the world is rooted in the 'creative imagination', by which Avis means a "symbolic realism" with emphasis on both terms. The character of the Christian faith is symbolic in that it does not describe reality unequivocally, but it is realist in that all its metaphors, symbols and myths converge on the reality of God. Based upon a participatory ontology, Avis offers an alternative to both an "objective" or "literal" approach to the truth of the Christian faith and a liberal "mere metaphor" discourse. His study in theological method entitled In Search of Authority: Anglican Theological Method from the Reformation to the Enlightenment (Bloomsbury/T&T Clark, 2014), was intended as the first of three volumes on the validity of Anglican theology, with special reference to the issue of the sources of authority in theological method. The second volume was Theology and the Enlightenment: A Critical Enquiry into Enlightenment Theology and its Reception (Bloomsbury/T&T Clark, 2023) which majors on Anglican writing in the Enlightenment context.

=== Ecclesiology ===
Most of Avis's work can be classified as ecclesiology: the study of the essence and structure of the Christian Church. The emphasis is either on the historical background (as in Anglicanism and the Christian Church), or on the identity of Anglicanism amidst the Christian churches and contemporary society (as in The Anglican Understanding of the Church; Church, State and Establishment; The Identity of Anglicanism and The Vocation of Anglicanism), or on ecumenism and ecumenical consensus theology (as in Ecumenical Theology and the Elusiveness of Doctrine; Christians in Communion; Reshaping Ecumenical Theology and Reconciling Theology). His editor's introduction to The Oxford Handbook of Ecclesiology, which he has edited, summarises his understanding of ecclesiology as a theological discipline. He is currently at work on a multi-volume personal project under the general title Theological Foundations of the Christian Church, the first volume being Jesus and the Church, 2021 (see bibliography below). Avis's view on the identity of the Anglican churches will be treated separately below.

=== Practical theology ===
Where theology, ecclesiology and ecclesial practice meet, Avis's work becomes practical-theological. This is most clearly the case with A Church Drawing Near: Spirituality and Mission in a Post-Christian Culture. Rooted in an analysis of the present Western-European cultural situation (between modernity and post-modernity) and in a pastoral translation of the ecumenically well-received koinonia theology (the "wholeness paradigm"), Avis offers a model for parochial practice which tries to relate the "common religion" of contemporary people to the specific contents of the Christian faith. In trying to do justice to both, without suggesting that they can be too easily integrated, this book shares the insights of Avis's long experience as a parish priest as well as a theologian. His book Becoming a Bishop: Theological Handbook of Episcopal Ministry (Bloomsbury/T&T Clark, 2015), which was written at the request of the Secretary-General of the Anglican Communion, bridges practical theology and the Anglican tradition. His 2026 book Shaping a Church of Ethical Integrity: Groundwork for a Church Rebuilt (SCM Press, 2026) is an essay in applied ecclesiology, speaking to the heart of the Church of England's current problems.

== Anglicanism ==
A theme of special interest throughout Avis's publications is the identity of Anglicanism. This section deals with three aspects which are of particular relevance to Avis's view on Anglicanism in the contemporary ecumenical context.

=== Catholic and Reformed ===
According to Avis, the Anglican churches are both Catholic and Reformed. They are Catholic because they claim to be a manifestation of the Christian Church as the creed confesses it, but also because they are consciously aware of their continuity with the pre-Reformation Church. The Catholicity of Anglicanism is visible through its adherence to scripture, the ancient creeds, the central sacraments of baptism and the eucharist, and the ministry of bishops, priests and deacons in apostolic succession. Simultaneously, the Anglican churches are Reformed because since the Reformation they are aware that scripture is the only ultimate check of any teaching and practice of the church, and because they do not deny the qualification of a "true church" to Protestant churches without bishops. Avis roots the "Catholic and Reformed" character of Anglicanism in historical research (especially in Anglicanism and the Christian Church and Beyond the Reformation?) and applies this insight both internally (reviewing the diverse "schools" of Anglican thought) and externally (in Anglicanism's ecumenical relations).

=== Episcopacy ===
Whether a church should have the episcopal ministry (bishops) to be a "true church" is a highly important question in ecumenical dialogue. It has to with "academic" reflection about the essence and structure of the church, but also with the very practical question whether churches without bishops can be affiliated to Anglican churches at several levels of "communion" (mutual recognition and participation). Avis's view on episcopacy is nuanced. On the one hand, he affirms the episcopal character of Anglicanism and does not believe that any future uniting church, involving Anglican churches, can do without bishops. On the other hand, he does not "unchurch" non-episcopal churches; that is, he does not deny that non-episcopal churches are true churches with true sacraments. Avis deduces this position from the theological and practical history of the Church of England, in which other churches were not denied their ecclesiality, but episcopacy was always seen as necessary for full visible unity.

=== Baptism and the Eucharist ===
Avis's theology is deeply sacramental without becoming partisan or restrictive. Based upon the theology of "symbolic realism" (see above), Avis's thought is neither individualist nor spiritualist. His "wholeness paradigm" for church and society is rooted in the notion of koinonia (communion, fellowship). The church expresses this symbolic realism and this communal understanding of humanity in its sacraments. Baptism incorporates people into the body of Christ and the eucharist reconstitutes this body time and again. For Avis, these sacraments (together with the proclamation of the Word) are the core of an ecclesial life that opens up towards a pastoral and missionary presence in society.

== Works (selected) ==
=== Published books ===
- The Church in the Theology of the Reformers (London: Marshall, Morgan and Scott, 1982; reprinted Eugene, Oregon: Wipf and Stock, 1982)
- Ecumenical Theology and the Elusiveness of Doctrine (London: SPCK, 1986) ISBN 9780281041855
- The Methods of Modern Theology (Basingstoke, Hants: Marshall Pickering, 1986) ISBN 9780551013476
- Foundations of Modern Historical Thought: From Machiavelli to Vico (Beckenham, Kent: Croom Helm, 1986) ISBN 9780709905813
- Gore: Construction and Conflict (Worthing, Sussex: Churchman, 1988) ISBN 9781850930846
- Eros and the Sacred (London: SPCK, 1989) ISBN 9780819215284
- Christians in Communion (London: Geoffrey Chapman Mowbray, 1990)
- Authority, Leadership and Conflict in the Church (London: Mowbray, 1992) ISBN 0264672194
- Faith in the Fires of Criticism: Christianity in Modern Thought (London; Darton, Longman and Todd, 1995; reprinted Eugene, Oregon: Wipf and Stock, 2006) ISBN 9780232521313
- God and the Creative Imagination: Metaphor, Symbol and Myth in Religion and Theology (London: Routledge, 1999) ISBN 9780415215039
- The Anglican Understanding of the Church (London: SPCK, 2000)
- Church, State and Establishment (London: SPCK, 2001)
- Anglicanism and the Christian Church: Theological Resources in Historical Perspective ([1989] 2nd edn, London and New York: T&T Clark, 2002)
- A Church Drawing Near: Spirituality and Mission in a Post-Christian Culture (London and New York: T&T Clark, 2003)
- A Ministry Shaped by Mission (London and New York: T&T Clark, 2005) ISBN 9780567083685
- Beyond the Reformation? Authority, Primacy and Unity in the Conciliar Tradition (London and New York: T&T Clark, 2006)
- The Identity of Anglicanism: Essentials of Anglican Ecclesiology (London and New York: T&T Clark, 2008) ISBN 9780567032041
- Reshaping Ecumenical Theology (London and New York: T&T Clark, 2010)
- Becoming a Bishop: Theological Handbook of Episcopal Ministry (Bloomsbury/T&T Clark, 2015) ISBN 9780567657275
- In Search of Authority: Anglican Theological Method from the Reformation to the Enlightenment (Bloomsbury/T&T Clark, 2014). ISBN 9780567328465
- Jesus and the Church: The Foundation of the Church in the New Testament and Modern Theology (Bloomsbury/T&T Clark, 2020). ISBN 9780567697493
- Reconciling Theology (SCM Press, 2022). ISBN 9780334061380
- Theology and the Enlightenment: A Critical Enquiry into Enlightenment Theology and its Reception (Bloomsbury/T&T Clark, 2022) ISBN 9780567705655
- Revelation and the World of God (Bloomsbury/T&T Clark, 2024) ISBN 978-0-567-70419-1
- Shaping a Church of Ethical Integrity: Groundwork for a Church Rebuilt (SCM Press, 2026). ISBN 978-0-334-06661-3

=== Collections edited ===
- The Threshold of Theology (Basingstoke, Hampshire: Marshall Pickering, 1988)
- The Resurrection of Jesus Christ (London: Darton, Longman & Todd, 1993)
- Divine Revelation (London: Darton, Longman & Todd; Grand Rapids: Eerdmans, 1997)
- The Christian Church: An Introduction to the Major Traditions (London: SPCK, 2002) ISBN 9780281052462
- Public Faith? The State of Religious Belief and Practice in Britain (London: SPCK, 2003)
- Seeking the Truth of Change in the Church: Reception, Communion and the Ordination of Women (London and New York: T&T Clark, 2004)
- Paths to Unity (London: Church House Publishing, 2004)
- The Journey of Christian Initiation: Theological and Pastoral Perspectives (London: Church House Publishing, 2011)
- The Lambeth Conference: Theology, History, Polity and Purpose, ed. Paul Avis and Benjamin Guyer (November 2017). ISBN 9780567662316
- Oxford Handbook of Ecclesiology (Oxford: Oxford University Press, 2018). ISBN 9780198837466
- Neville Figgs, CR: His Life, Thought and Significance (Brill, 2022). ISBN 9789004503113
