= Before Jerusalem Fell =

1989 book by Kenneth Gentry

Before Jerusalem Fell: Dating The Book of Revelation
- Author: Kenneth Gentry
- Language: English
- Publisher: American Vision
- Publication date: 1989

Before Jerusalem Fell: Dating The Book of Revelation is a 1989 book written by Kenneth Gentry based on his PhD dissertation from Whitefield Theological Seminary. The book is currently in its third edition and is published by American Vision in Atlanta, Georgia.

== Content ==
The book presents a sustained argument from biblical hermeneutics, ancient history, textual criticism, archaeology, and Christian theology for why the Book of Revelation must have been written before the destruction of Jerusalem in AD 70, during the reign of Roman emperor Nero. Gentry argues that Nero Caesar is the "sixth king" presently ruling (Revelation 17:10) who functions in Revelation as the Beast.

Gentry focuses on the foundation of most external evidence for the late-date hypothesis of the Book of Revelation, which is a statement by Irenaeus that 'the Apocalyptic vision was seen during Domitian's reign'. The original statement is ambiguous, and Gentry proposes that it could also be translated to mean 'apostle John, who wrote the vision, was seen during Domitian's reign,' hence it is not relevant to the late date argument. Iraneaus is also considered prone to historical error as, for example, he wrote that Jesus lived until almost fifty years of age, after fifteen years of earthly ministry. These build reasons for Gentry to claim that Irenaeus' statement cannot be conclusive.

== Controversy ==
The book is controversial, because it goes against majority evangelical and Dispensational opinion that Revelation was written in the reign of Domitian in AD 95, though the pre-AD 70 date for Revelation was the dominant view of scholars in the 19th century and first two decades of the 20th century.

== See also ==
- Preterism
