= Henry Oldfield =

Henry Oldfield may refer to:

- Henry Ambrose Oldfield (1822–1871), British painter
- Henry George Oldfield (fl. 1785–1805), English architect, antiquary, and artist
