= Church of St Peter, St Albans =

Church in Hertfordshire, England

Coordinates: 51.7554°N 0.3350°W

St Peter's Church, St Albans
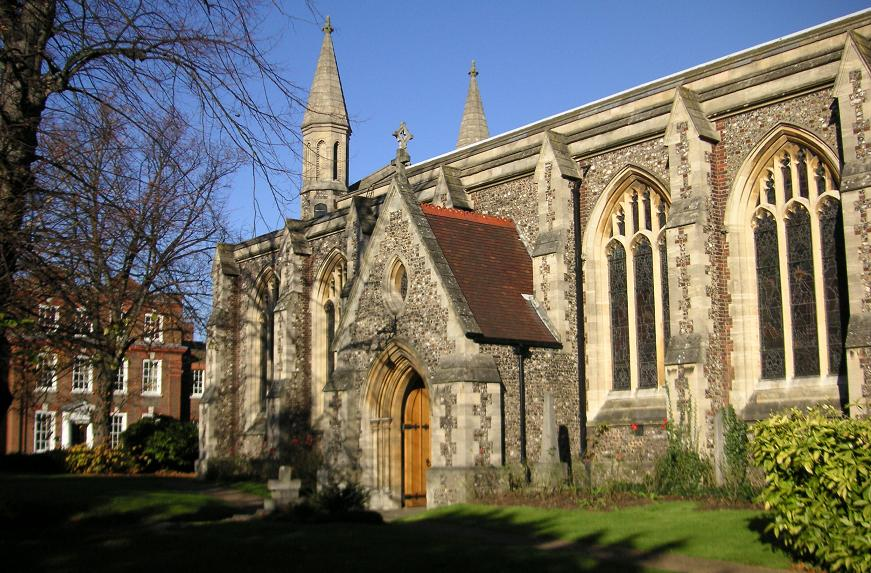
- St Peter's Church, St Albans
- St Peter's Church, St Albans
- Denomination: Church of England
- Churchmanship: Broad Church
- Website: www.stpeterschurch.uk.com

History
- Dedication: St. Peter

Administration
- Province: Canterbury
- Diocese: St Albans
- Parish: St Albans

Clergy
- Vicar: The Revd Canon Mark Dearnley

St Peter's Church is a Church of England parish church. It is located in St Albans, England, at the northern end of the town centre.

== Background ==
It is believed, based upon the writing of Matthew Paris, to have been founded in AD 948 by Abbot Ulsinus of St Albans. There is some uncertainty about the dates other details in the writings of Paris, but there is little doubt that the church, together with St Stephen's and St Michael's churches, was built at about that time to receive pilgrims and to prepare them for their visit to the shrine of St Alban within St Albans Abbey. The three churches, all of which still exist as active places of Christian worship, stand on the three main roads into St Albans.

== History ==
In the mid-12th century it was one of the 15 churches which, with St Albans Abbey, became exempt from the jurisdiction of the Bishop of Lincoln. It was then ruled by the Abbot of St Albans until the Dissolution of the Monasteries. After the Dissolution in 1539, the churches of St Albans became part of the Diocese of London until 1845 when Hertfordshire was transferred to the Diocese of Rochester. The original St. Peter's Schools were in Old London Road where the foundation stone can still be seen. In 1877 the Diocese of St Albans was created and the old abbey church became the new cathedral.

== Architecture ==
The original Anglo-Saxon structure would have been made of wood but nothing now remains of this. No records exist of St Peter's for nearly 200 years after its foundation. During the 13th century the church assumed the form which it retained until the early 19th century - a cruciform building with a central tower. Thomas Baskerfield's drawings of 1787 give an impression of what the church was like in its essentials for many centuries.

The nave arcades and the greater part of the aisle walls were rebuilt in the 15th century but the 13th century west and south doorways were preserved. In 1756 the tower arches were removed and loftier ones inserted, as it appears that the floor of the original belfry was so low as to obstruct the perspective view of the church, but these alterations weakened the whole structure and 30 years later the tower became dangerous. In 1785, after a protracted wrangle between the rector and members of the vestry, who were not prepared to embark on what they considered extravagant repairs, the tower was underpinned with timber. However, in 1799 the tower had become so dangerous that it was taken down to the level of the crossing arches and finally in 1801 the belfry floor fell in. The new tower, which was erected in brick, was essentially as is seen today in size and shape. At the same time the transepts were demolished and the chancel shortened almost out of existence.

In 1893, after he had completed his restoration of the Cathedral and Abbey Church, Lord Grimthorpe took it upon himself to restore St Peter's at his own expense. Reportedly only an hour-and-a-half's examination of the church enabled him to decide "what is necessary and desirable to do in the way of restoring it to a safe and creditable condition as far as the modern alterations leave it possible". He lengthened the chancel and the nave by one bay each. He also widened the church by demolishing the north wall of the nave and building a new north wall outside the line of the old one. The west end is similar in design to that of the north transept in the abbey with a rose window flanked by turrets. Lord Grimthorpe also raised the roof with a steeper pitch and evidence of the previous flatter pitched nave roof can be seen on the western face of the chancel arch. The angel corbels which held the beams of that roof have been left in their original position.

== Present ==
Each Sunday there is a traditional 8am service, a 10am Communion Service and a 6.30pm Evensong sung by a robed choir. The three-manual organ, by Mander Organs, was installed in 2005–6.

In the popular BBC soap opera EastEnders, Ricky and Bianca's second wedding was filmed inside and outside the church.

Anne Hollinghurst served as St Peter's vicar (the first woman to so serve) from 2010 to 2015 when she became one of the first women to be a Church of England bishop, after being appointed the Bishop of Aston in the Diocese of Birmingham.

The current vicar is the Revd Canon Mark Dearnley, and the Revd Liz Guest is Associate Priest with special responsibility for children and families.

== See also ==
- Saint Peter
- St Peter, Hertfordshire
