= Siegfried II (archbishop of Mainz) =

German archbishop

- Archbishop of Mainz
- Church: Catholic Church
- Diocese: Electorate of Mainz
- In office: 1200–1230

Personal details
- Died: 9 September 1230 Erfurt

Siegfried II von Eppstein (died 9 September 1230) was archbishop of Mainz from 1200 to 1230.

Siegfried was born the second son Gerhard I of Eppstein and hit an ecclesiastical career. Already in 1189 he was the owner of the parish of St. Gangolph in Mainz. He was the provost of St. Martin in Worms 1194 and of St. Peter in Mainz 1196.

== Sources ==
- Friedrich Wilhelm Schirrmacher: Siegfried II. In: Allgemeine Deutsche Biographie (ADB). Vol. 34, Duncker & Humblot, Leipzig 1892, p. 259ff.

Preceded by Conrad of Wittelsbach	Archbishop of Mainz; 1200–1230	Succeeded by Siegfried III
