= Anne Hollinghurst =

British bishop

The Right Reverend Anne Hollinghurst
- Principal of The Queen's Foundation, Edgbaston
- Church: Church of England
- In office: 2024–present
- Other posts: Honorary assistant bishop (Lichfield, 2024–present)
- Previous posts: Bishop of Aston (2015–2024); Vicar of St Peter's Church, St Albans (2010–2015)

Orders
- Ordination: 1996 (deacon); 1997 (priest)
- Consecration: 29 September 2015 by Justin Welby

Personal details
- Born: Anne Elizabeth Bailey; 4 March 1964 (age 62)
- Denomination: Anglican
- Spouse: Steve Hollinghurst (m. 1984)
- Education: Trinity College, Bristol; University of Bristol; Hughes Hall, Cambridge

Anne Elizabeth Hollinghurst (born 4 March 1964) is a Church of England bishop currently serving as Principal of The Queen's Foundation, Edgbaston. She previously served as Bishop of Aston, the suffragan bishop in the Diocese of Birmingham, from September 2015 until September 2024.

== Early life ==
Hollinghurst was born on 4 March 1964 to William and Audrey Bailey. She was educated at Range High School, a coeducational secondary school and sixth form in Formby, Merseyside.

Her childhood faith was nurtured in the Church of England in the Anglo-Catholic tradition, at St Peter's Church, Formby. Her early ministry was as a youth worker in suburban Sussex at Holy Trinity Cuckfield and then in inner-city Nottingham at St Stephen's Hyson Green with St Leodegarius Basford. She entered Trinity College, Bristol, an Open Evangelical Anglican theological college, to train for ordained ministry and graduated from the University of Bristol with a Bachelor of Arts (BA) Theology degree in 1996.

== Ordained ministry ==
Hollinghurst was ordained in the Church of England: she was made a deacon at Petertide 1996 (30 June) by Patrick Harris, Bishop of Southwell, at Southwell Minster and ordained a priest the Petertide following (28 June 1997), by Alan Morgan, Bishop of Sherwood, at Christ Church, Chilwell. From 1996 to 1999, she served her curacy at St Saviours in the Meadows, Nottingham. She shared this curacy with her husband, Steve Hollinghurst, who is also a Church of England priest. From 1999 to 2005, she was jointly the Anglican chaplain for the University of Derby and a chaplain of Derby Cathedral. During this time, she also lectured on religion and gender in the Religious Studies Department of the University of Derby.

In 2005, she moved to Manchester. She was appointed domestic chaplain to the Bishop of Manchester, Nigel McCulloch, and a residentiary canon of Manchester Cathedral. She completed a Master of Studies (MSt) degree in Jewish Christian Relations at Hughes Hall, Cambridge in 2010. Her dissertation was titled "The soul's longing for God: allegorical and symbolic readings of the Song of Songs in 12th and 13th century western Europe, and the relationship between evolving forms of Christian and Jewish mystical piety". On 12 January 2010, she became Vicar of St Peter's Church, St Albans in the Diocese of St Albans. In 2011, she was elected a member of the House of Clergy of the General Synod.

=== Episcopal ministry ===
On 2 July 2015, Hollinghurst was announced as the Bishop of Aston, a suffragan bishopric in the Diocese of Birmingham. On 29 September 2015, she was consecrated a bishop by Justin Welby, the Archbishop of Canterbury, during a service at St Paul's Cathedral, London; she became the tenth Bishop of Aston. She holds a particular brief for mission, ministry and vocations in the diocese.

As bishop, she has served on the Faith and Order Commission of the Church of England. She is a member of the Birmingham Faith Leaders Group supporting interfaith relations across the city. Since 2020, she has been Bishop Visitor to the Anglican Religious Community of men and women at Mucknell Abbey.

She was Acting Bishop of Birmingham between October 2022 and March 2024.

On 10 April 2024, her appointment was announced as Principal of the Queen’s Foundation, Birmingham – a diverse, ecumenical theological training and research institution serving the Church of England, Methodist Church, Black Majority / Black Pentecostal churches, and many independent students. She took up the role in September 2024, resigning her See around that same time. On 20 September 2024, she was additionally commissioned an honorary assistant bishop of the neighbouring Diocese of Lichfield (and a member of the diocesan House of Bishops).

=== Views and Interests ===
Hollinghurst has spoken on areas relating to the church's mission including a recorded series on the Five Marks of Mission and at various conferences.

Other past and present research interests include feminist theology, gender and the language of God, Environmental Theology and Christian Spirituality. Hollinghurst has contributed a chapter on Franciscan spirituality and nature to the book Earthed.

In the public square Hollinghurst has spoken out on a number of issues. She was one of the 31 Church of England bishops who called on the Government to sign the United Nations' Treaty on the Prohibition of Nuclear Weapons.

She has campaigned on environmental issues, taking part in the Big One Climate Protest April 2023 as part of Christian Climate Action, stating "it's time to act on what we know about the effects of burning of fossil fuels and how this continues to accelerate rapidly rising global warming and the environmental disaster that follows, impacting especially the poorest communities across our world." Other interests include education, housing and modern slavery.

As Acting Bishop of Birmingham she led the Diocese from October 2022 through key stages of the Church of England’s Living in Love and Faith process supporting the proposals for the Prayers of Love and Faith, which include enabling prayers for God’s blessing to be prayed for same-sex couples. She was one of 44 bishops who signed an open letter in November 2023 which recognised "the complexities of Pastoral Guidance in relation to ministry, and also the need for a swift end to the current uncertainty for LGBTQIA+ clergy and ordinands", calling for "the removal of restrictions on clergy entering same-sex civil marriages, and on bishops ordaining and licensing such clergy, as well as granting permissions to officiate". It expressed a longing that "we will find a way that will recognise and honour our different perspectives and the gift we are to each other within the life of the Church of England, such that no one is expected to act against their conscience or theological conviction".

A letter signed by more than 85 church leaders across the Diocese of Birmingham was published in December 2023 expressing their gratitude to Hollinghurst for her leadership and modelling of the Pastoral Principles.

== Personal life ==
In 1984, she married Steve Hollinghurst. He is a priest in the Church of England who worked with the Church Army from 2003 to 2019. He is currently Diocesan Mission Enabler, Environment, at the Diocese of Hereford.

Church of England titles
Preceded by Andrew Watson	Bishop of Aston; 2015–2024	TBA
