= Faith and Order Commission (Church of England) =

In 2010, the Faith and Order Commission of the General Synod of the Church of England was created out of the Faith and Order Advisory Group, which had been in existence since at least 1985. In the process of transformation from an 'Advisory Group' to a 'Commission of the General Synod' the organisation took over responsibility for investigating questions regarding the doctrine of the Church of England previously discharged on an occasional basis by a Doctrine Commission of the General Synod. The new commission also absorbed the House of Bishops Theological Group. As the successor to the Faith and Order Advisory Group the Commission maintains close links with the Council for Christian Unity.

The Faith and Order Commission comprises sixteen members (six bishops, one of whom is the Chair, and ten lay or ordained persons). The six bishops together comprise the House of Bishops Theological Group and are able to meet separately as required. The Commission meets four times per year.

== Members ==
=== Episcopal ===
- Christopher Cocksworth, Anglican Bishop of Coventry (Chair)
- Jonathan Baker, Anglican Bishop of Fulham
- Anne Hollinghurst, Anglican Bishop of Aston
- Michael Ipgrave, Anglican Bishop of Lichfield
- Martin Warner, Anglican Bishop of Chichester

=== Non-episcopal ===
- Nicholas Adams
- Loveday Alexander
- Andrew Atherstone
- Mike Higton
- Joshua Hordern
- Rachel Mann
- Sharon Prentis
- Sarah Schofield
- Thomas Seville
- Jenn Strawbridge
- Jeremy Worthen

== Publications ==
=== Faith and Order Advisory Group (1985-2010) ===
- Women in the Episcopate? An Anglican - Roman Catholic Dialogue Church House Publishing, 2008. [With the House of Bishops Advisory Group]
- The Mission and Ministry of the Whole Church Church House Publishing, 2007.
- Paths to Unity: explorations in ecumenical method Church House Publishing, 2004.
- Unpacking the Gift: Anglican Resources for theological reflection on The Gift of Authority (2001). [Essay collection]
- For Such a Time as This: A Renewed Diaconate in the Church of England Church House Publishing, 2001.
- The Eucharist: Sacrament of Unity (2001). [With the House of Bishops Advisory Group]

=== Faith and Order Commission (2010-present) ===
- Men and Women in Marriage (2013)
- God's Unfailing Word: Theological and Practical Perspectives on Christian-Jewish Relations (2019)

== See also ==
- Anglican–Roman Catholic International Commission
- Faith and Order Commission (World Council of Churches)
- International Theological Commission (Roman Catholic)
- World Evangelical Alliance Theological Commission
