= Thomas Schirrmacher =

German Christian moral philosopher

Thomas Paul Schirrmacher
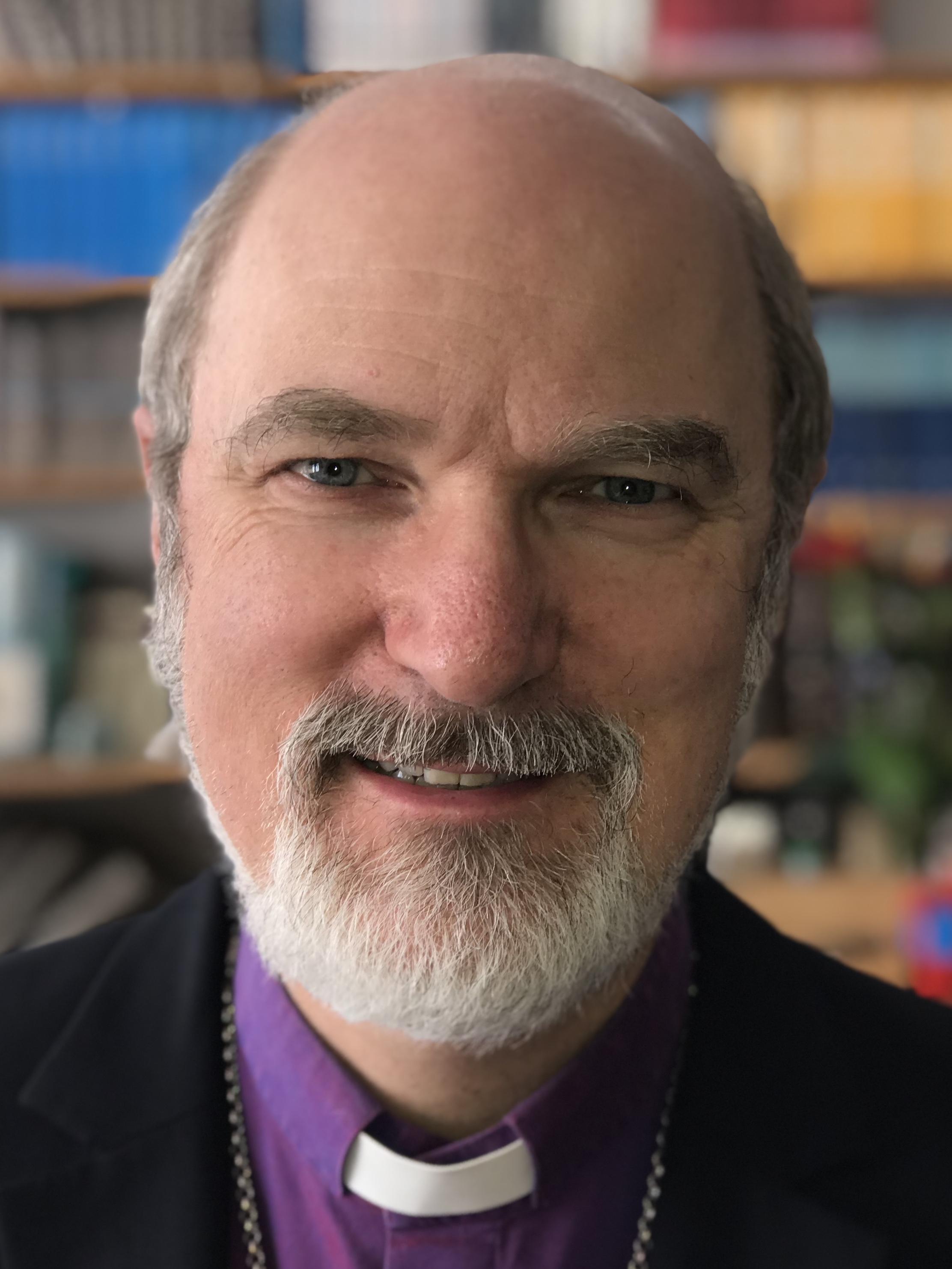
- Official office photo of the WEA
- Born: 25 June 1960 (age 66); Schwelm, West Germany
- Citizenship: German
- Employer(s): World Evangelical Alliance, Martin Bucer Seminary
- Known for: Christian moral philosophy, human rights, religious freedom
- Spouse: Christine Schirrmacher

Thomas Paul Schirrmacher (born 25 June 1960) is a German Christian moral philosopher and a specialist in the Sociology of Religion and religious freedom. He is known as a global human rights activist and holds a chair in Theology (Ethics, Missiology, World Religions).

Schirrmacher served the World Evangelical Alliance as secretary general from 2021–2024 and as chair of the Theological Commission. He is also an Anglican realignment bishop of Communio Christiana.

Since 2014 he is president of the International Council of the International Society for Human Rights and of the International Institute for Religious Freedom.

== Biography ==
=== Family ===
Thomas Schirrmacher was born on June 25, 1960 to the German professor of Telecommunications engineering Bernd Schirrmacher and his wife Ingeborg. His grandfather is the history professor Friedrich Wilhelm Schirrmacher while his great-grandfather is Carl Friedrich Schirrmacher, Director of the Danzig St. Petri School. The Schirrmacher family are Huguenots who were exiled from Salzburg in the 18th century and subsequently settled in Danzig, Prussia.

Thomas Schirrmacher is married to Christine Schirrmacher who is a professor of Islamic Studies in Bonn, Germany.

=== Education ===
Thomas Schirrmacher studied theology from 1978 to 1982 at STH Basel (Switzerland) and since 1983 Cultural Anthropology and Comparative Religion at University of Bonn. He earned a Drs. theol. in Missiology and Ecumenism at Theological University (Kampen/Netherlands) in 1984, and a Dr. theol. in Missiology and Ecumenics at Theological University of the Reformed Churches (Kampen/Netherlands) in 1985, a Ph.D. in Cultural Anthropology at Pacific Western University (today: California Miramar University) in Los Angeles (CA) in 1989, a Th.D. in Ethics at Whitefield Theological Seminary in Lakeland (FL) in 1996, and a Dr. phil. in Comparative Religion and Sociology of Religion at University of Bonn in 2007. In 1997 he got honorary doctorates (D.D.) from Cranmer Theological House and in 2006 from ACTS Academy of Higher Education in Bangalore.

=== Career ===
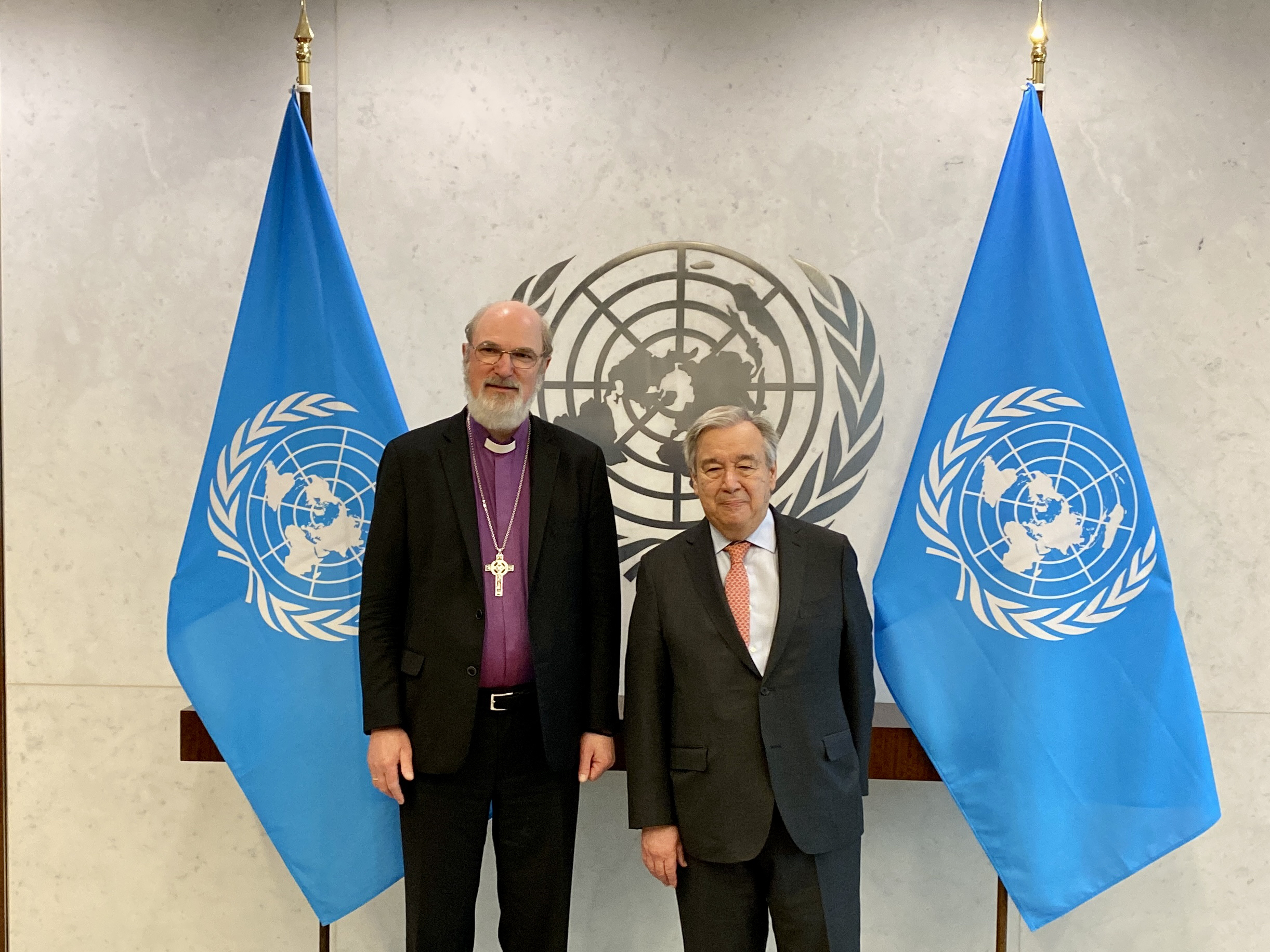
Thomas Schirrmacher and António Guterres, the secretary-general of the United Nations (2022)

Between 1982 and 1986 Schirrmacher was pastor of several church communities in Bonn. From 1996 to 2018, Thomas Schirrmacher was rector of the private Martin Bucer Seminary, a theological seminary seated in Bonn (Germany) with campuses in several countries which he founded, and where he continues to teach systematic theology (especially ethics) as well as comparative religion studies and is vice president for International Affairs. From 1994 to 1998 Schirrmacher was professor of missions at the Philadelphia Theological Seminary, known today as Reformed Episcopal Seminary, and since 1995 he is professor for systematic theology at the Whitefield Theological Seminary. He is also a professor for the sociology of religion at the West University of Timişoara and lecturer in the Advanced Programme “Human Rights and Religious Freedom” at Oxford University (Regent's Park College, Oxford).

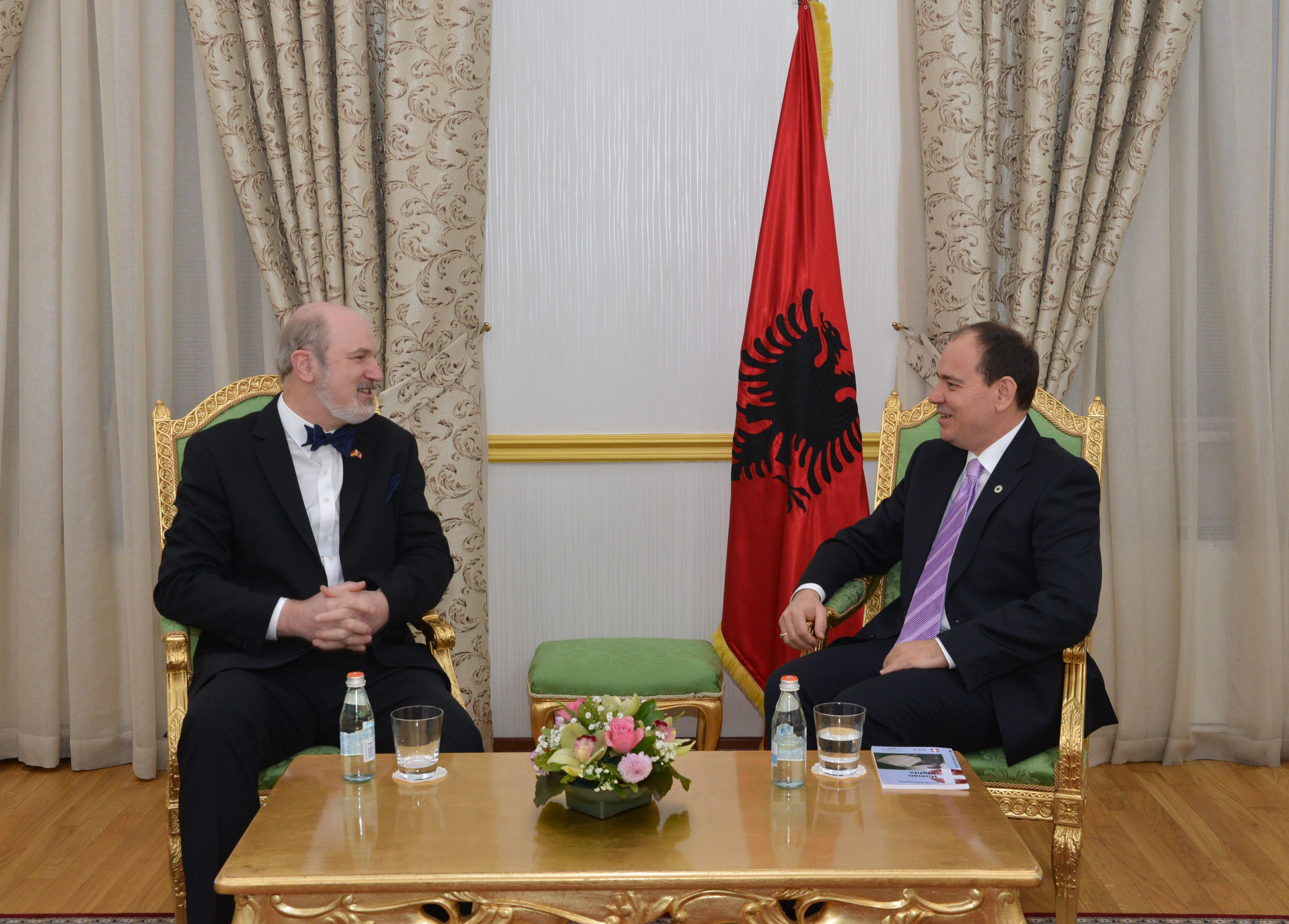
Schirrmacher at the President of Albania 2015

Schirrmacher was chairman of the Board of Trustees of the Gebende Hände gGmbH (German: Giving Hands charitable Gesellschaft mit beschränkter Haftung), an internationally active relief organisation, and now is its senior advisor. He is member of the commission for religious freedom of the World Evangelical Alliance. He also is their speaker for human rights. According to media he is one of the leading experts on the topic of persecution of Christians. Several times he was speaking as expert on human rights in the German Parliament. In October 2015 he was the only evangelical member of the Catholic synod on family led by Pope Francis. He is president of the International Society for Human Rights, manager of the Religious Liberty Commission of the German and the Swiss Evangelical Alliance, and president of the International Institute for Religious Freedom (IIRF) with regional offices for most continents: Brasilia (Latin America), Brussels/Bonn (Europe), Cape Town (Africa), Colombo and Delhi (Asia), which cooperates with the UN Special Rapporteur for Freedom of Religion or Belief. Schirrmacher serves on the Global Advisory Board of Timothy Two Project International.

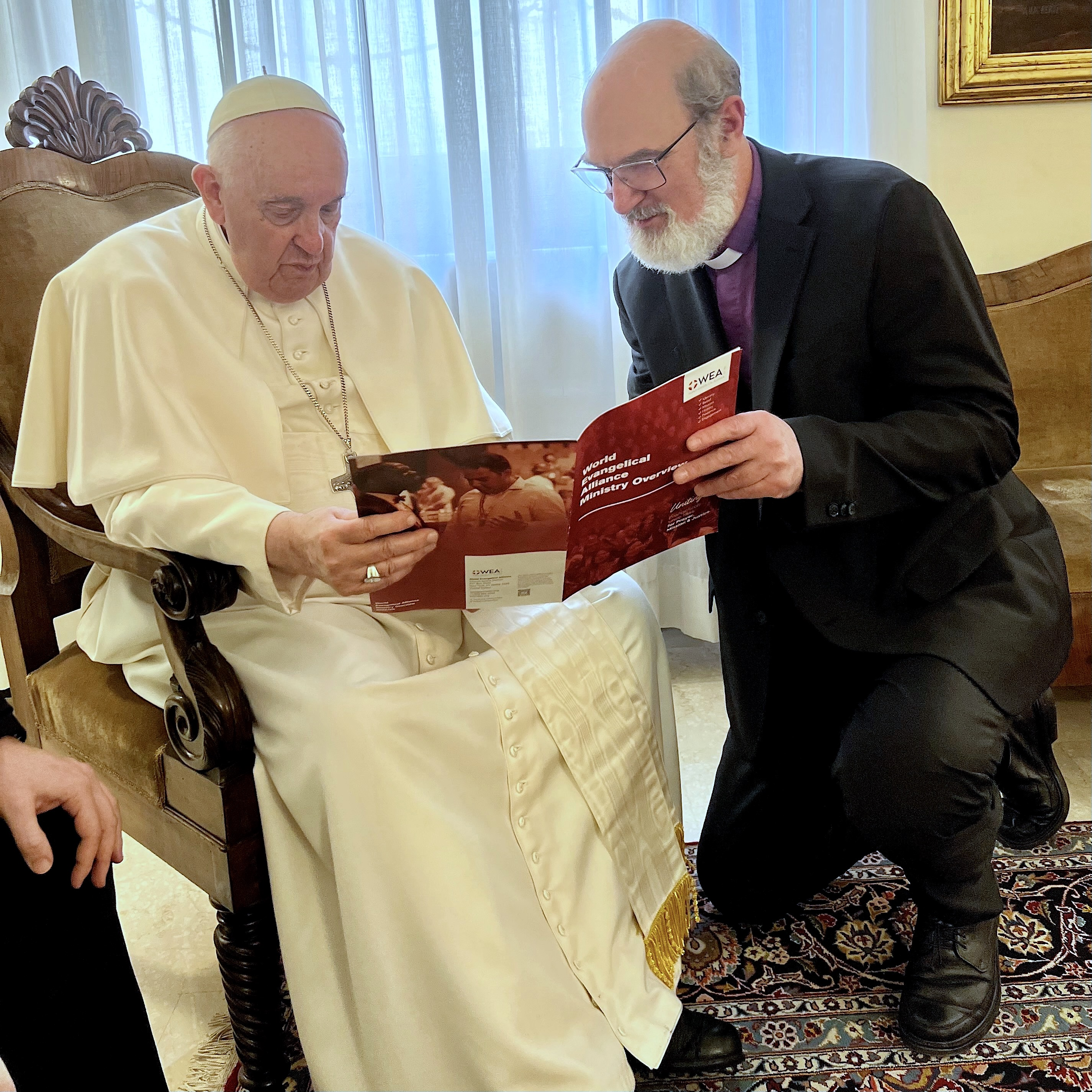
Thomas Schirrmacher discussing the new WEA brochure with Pope Francis when visiting the Pope when he fulfilled a decade in office. (March 2023)

In 2016 he was ordained as bishop of the Communio Christiana (a church in the Anglican realignment). On October 27, 2020, Schirrmacher was elected the next General Secretary of the World Evangelical Alliance. His term of office began in March 2021. In March 2024, Schirrmacher resigned from his position due to health problems resulting from a long Covid disease. As of October 2024, Schirrmacher belonged to the Continuing Evangelical Episcopal Communion.

Another main focus of the work of Schirrmacher besides religious freedom in the area of human rights is the fight against human trafficking.

He speaks with church leaders like Pope Benedict XVI, Pope Francis, and the Ecumenical Patriarch Bartholomew I and gives lectures all around the world. He is considered one of the architects of the so-called “Christian witness in a multi-religious world”. He is also consultant of the Faith and Order Commission, the Theological Commission of the World Council of Churches, chair of the Board of Advisors of the Central Council of Oriental Christians in Germany (ZOCD), and Member of the International Committee of the Global Christian Forum. Schirrmacher is also a member of the World Council of Religions for Peace and of the Institute for the Freedom of Faith & Security in Europe (IFFSE) founded by Jewish rabbis.

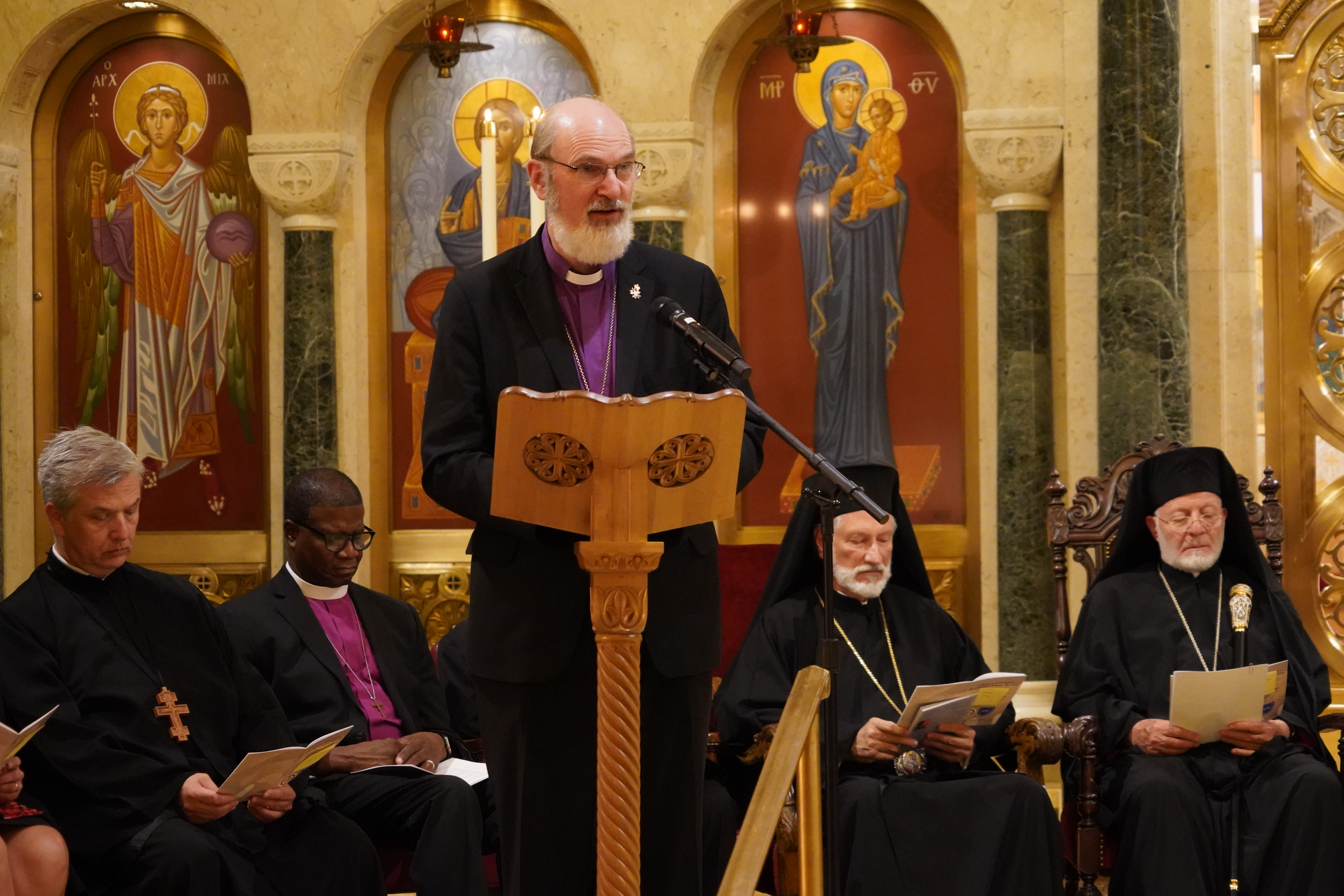
Thomas Schirrmacher speaking in the orthodox Saint Sophia Cathedral (Washington, D.C.) in 2021

He has authored and edited more than 100 books, which have been translated into 18 languages.

=== Honours ===
Schirrmacher received the following honours:

- 1996: Honorary doctorate for his “Ethics” from Whitefield Theological Seminary (Lakeland/Florida)
- 1997: Honorary doctorate from the Anglican Cranmer Theological House
- 2002: ‘Man of Achievement’ in ethics of international development, International Biographical Center Oxford
- 2006: Honorary doctorate at the ACTS Academy of Higher Education in Bangalore, India
- 2007: Dr. phil. University of Bonn, Franz-Delitzsch-Förderpreis for his dissertation on ‘Hitlers Kriegsreligion’
- 2008: Human Rights Award Pro Fide
- 2017: ‘Stephanus-Sonderpreis’ for religious freedom by the Stephanus-Stiftung (Frankfurt)
- 2021: Honorary doctorate for its commitment to Christian ethics, human rights, and oppressed and persecuted Christians from the Johann Heinrich Pestalozzi Christian University
- 2022: Health Media Award (London) for his global commitment to basic health services

== Works ==
=== Books (selection) ===
- Schirrmacher, Thomas, Human Rights Threatened in Europe (PDF), Contra mundum.
- ——— (1985), Theodor Christlieb und seine Missionstheologie (Dissertation) (in German), Verlag und Schriftenmission der Evangelischen Gesellschaft für Deutschland, ISBN 3-87857209-3.
- ——— (2002), Anwalt der Liebe: Martin Bucer als Theologe und Seelsorger : Beiträge zum 450. Todestag des Reformators (in German), VKW, ISBN 978-3-93282933-8.
- ——— (2007), Hitlers Kriegsreligion: die Verankerung der Weltanschauung Hitlers in seiner religiösen Begrifflichkeit und seinem Gottesbild (3 volumes) (in German), VKW, ISBN 978-3-938116-31-9.
- ——— (2008), World mission: Heart of Christianity (PDF), Hamburg: RVB, ISBN 978-3-928936-37-8.
- ——— (2008), The Persecution of Christians Concerns Us All: Towards a Theology of Martyrdom (PDF), Bonn: Culture and Science Publishing (VKW), ISBN 978-3-938116-65-4.
- ——— (2008), May a Christian Go to Court? (PDF), Bonn: Culture and Science Publishing (VKW), ISBN 978-3-938116-63-0.
- ——— (2002), Hope for Europe: 66 propositions, Nürnberg: VTR (in 14 languages)
- ——— (2013), Human Trafficking: The Return to Slavery (PDF), Bonn: Culture and Science Publishing (VKW), ISBN 978-3-86269-070-1.
- ——— (2013), Culture of Shame / Culture of Guilt (PDF), Bonn: Culture and Science Publishing (VKW), ISBN 978-3-86269-044-2.
- ——— (2013), Advocate of Love – Martin Bucer as Theologian and Pastor (PDF), Bonn: Culture and Science Publishing (VKW), ISBN 978-3-86269-058-9.
- ——— (2013), Leadership and Ethical Responsibility: The Three Aspects of Every Decision, Bonn: Culture and Science Publishing (VKW), ISBN 978-3-86269-072-5.
- ——— (2013), The Koran and the Bible (PDF), Bonn: Culture and Science Publishing (VKW), ISBN 978-3-86269-069-5.
- ——— (2016), Creation Care and Loving our Neighbors: Studies in Environmental Ethics (PDF), Bonn: Culture and Science Publishing (VKW), ISBN 978-3-86269-116-6.
- Schirrmacher, Thomas, ed. (2009), Calvin and World Mission: Essays, Culture and Science Publishing (VKW), ISBN 978-3-93811684-5.
- Schirrmacher, Thomas (2016), Kaffeepausen mit dem Papst: Meine Begegnungen mit Franziskus, Bonn: SCM Hänssler-Verlag, ISBN 978-3-7751-5763-6.
- ——— (2017), Missio Dei: God's Missional Nature (PDF), Bonn: Culture and Science Publishing (VKW), ISBN 978-3-86269-143-2.
- ——— (2017), Biblical Foundations for 21st Century World Mission: 69 Theses Toward an Ongoing Global Reformation (PDF), Bonn: Culture and Science Publishing (VKW), ISBN 978-3-86269-151-7.
- ——— (2018), The Persecution of Christians Concerns Us All, Bonn: Culture and Science Publishing (VKW), ISBN 978-3-86269-156-2.
- ——— (2018), Modern Fathers: Neither Wimps nor Tyrants (PDF), Bonn: Culture and Science Publishing (VKW), ISBN 978-3-86269-175-3.
- Schirrmacher, Thomas; Schirrmacher, David (2019), Corruption: When Self-Interest Comes before the Common Good (PDF), Bonn: Culture and Science Publishing (VKW), ISBN 978-3-86269-175-3.
- ———; Schirrmacher, Christine (2020), The Oppression of Women: Violence – Exploitation – Poverty (PDF), Bonn: Culture and Science Publishing (VKW), ISBN 978-3-86269-192-0.

=== Articles (selection) ===
- Schirrmacher, Thomas (1992), "National Socialism as Religion" (PDF), Chalcedon Report (referenced on p. 395 of Dawkins' The God Delusion).
- ——— (1995), "The Biblical Prohibition From Eating Blood" (PDF), Chalcedon Report.
- ——— (2000), "The Galileo affair: history or heroic hagiography?" (PDF), CEN Technical Journal, 14 (1): 99–100.
- ——— (2003), "Medical Killing – An Evangelical Perspective", Christ Bioeth, 9 (2–3): 227–44, doi:10.1093/chbi.9.2.227.30287, PMID 15254992
- ———, The German Creationist Movement, ICR (referenced on p. 544 of Ronald Numbers' The Creationists).
- Partial list of Publications by Drs. Cristine and Thomas Schirrmacher, Contra mundum.
- Schirrmacher, Thomas (2015), "Reflections on World Christianity and Challenges to Christian Unity from the Experience of the World Evangelical Alliance", 2015 Jeju Forum: A Gathering of Global Christian Leaders. Global Forum for the Future of World Christianity: 107–131.
- Schirrmacher, Thomas (2015), "Mission and Ethics of Mission 2014", Freedom of Belief and Christian Mission. Regnum Edinburgh Centenary Series, 28: 149–163.
- ——— (2016), "The member States of the Organisation of the Islamic Cooperation (OIC) have 300 million Christian citizens" (PDF), IIRF Reports (3).
- Schirrmacher, Thomas (2017), "The Reformation and the Challenge of Islam", Pierre Berthoud, Pieter J. Lalleman (Publ.). The Reformation: Its Roots and Its Legacy: 158–175.
- ——— (2017), "Taking the Chance to Get Closer" (PDF), EMW and Partners: A 40 Year's Journey in Ecumenical Mission: 285–288.
- Schirrmacher, Thomas (2017), "European religious freedom and the EU", Jonathan Chaplin, Gary Wilton (Publ.). God and the EU: Faith in the European Project: 151–174.
