= Doctrine Commission (Church of England) =

During the twentieth century, the Church of England periodically established a doctrine commission to report on an important theological question. The first commission "was appointed in 1922 and reported in 1938". In early years the commissions appear to have been appointed solely by the archbishops of Canterbury and York. In recent years the doctrine commission was constituted as a sub-commission of the General Synod. However, the members of the doctrine commission continued to be nominated by the Archbishops. In the early 1980s the House of Bishops took a greater interest in the work of the doctrine commission and the report We Believe in God (1987) was published "under its authority". This practice continued for the next three reports. After the completion of Being Human (2002) no further doctrine commission was nominated. In 2010 General Synod established a new permanent Faith and Order Commission of the General Synod which took over responsibility for producing theological reports for the House of Bishops.

== Doctrine Commission Reports ==
- Being Human (2002)
- The Mystery of Salvation (1995)
- We Believe in the Holy Spirit (1989)
- We Believe in God (1985)
- Christian Believing (1976)
- Prayer and the Departed (1971)
- Subscription and Assent to the Thirty-Nine Articles (1968)
- Doctrine in the Church of England (1938)

== Chairpersons ==
- Stephen Sykes (1996–2002)
- Alec Graham (1987–1995)
- John A. Baker (1986–1987)
- John V. Taylor (1981–1985)
- Maurice Wiles (?–1976)
- William Temple (?–1938)

== Doctrine Commission Publications ==
- Contemporary Doctrine Classics. Church House Publishing, 2005.

above reprints We Believe in God (1987), We Believe in the Holy Spirit (1991) and The Mystery of Salvation (1995)

- Being Human: A Christian understanding of personhood illustrated with reference to power, money, sex and time. Church House Publishing, 2003.
- The Mystery of Salvation. Church House Publishing, 1995.
- We Believe in the Holy Spirit. Church House Publishing, 1991.
- We Believe in God. Church House Publishing, 1987.
- Believing in the Church: The Corporate Nature of Faith. SPCK, 1981. [Essay collection]
- Christian believing: The nature of the Christian faith and its expression in Holy Scripture and creeds. SPCK, 1976. [Report and essays]
- Thinking about the Eucharist. SPCK, 1972. [Essay collection]
- Prayer and the Departed. SPCK, 1971.
- Subscription and Assent to the Thirty-Nine Articles. SPCK, 1968.
- Doctrine in the Church of England. SPCK, 1938. Reprinted by SPCK, 1982.

== Doctrine in the Church today ==
Since 2010 the Faith and Order Commission of the General Synod - which acts as a 'theological resource for the church as a whole' - has taken over the role played previously by the doctrine commission. Following the resignation of Rowan Williams as Archbishop of Canterbury in 2012 the English theologian John Milbank called for the foundation of an international doctrine commission. This body would be designed to serve the entire Anglican communion and would mirror the Catholic International Theological Commission which was founded in 1969.

== See also ==
- Faith and Order Commission (World Council of Churches)
- International Theological Commission (Roman Catholic
- Thirty-Nine Articles
- World Evangelical Alliance Theological Commission
