= International Society for Human Rights =

International human rights NGO

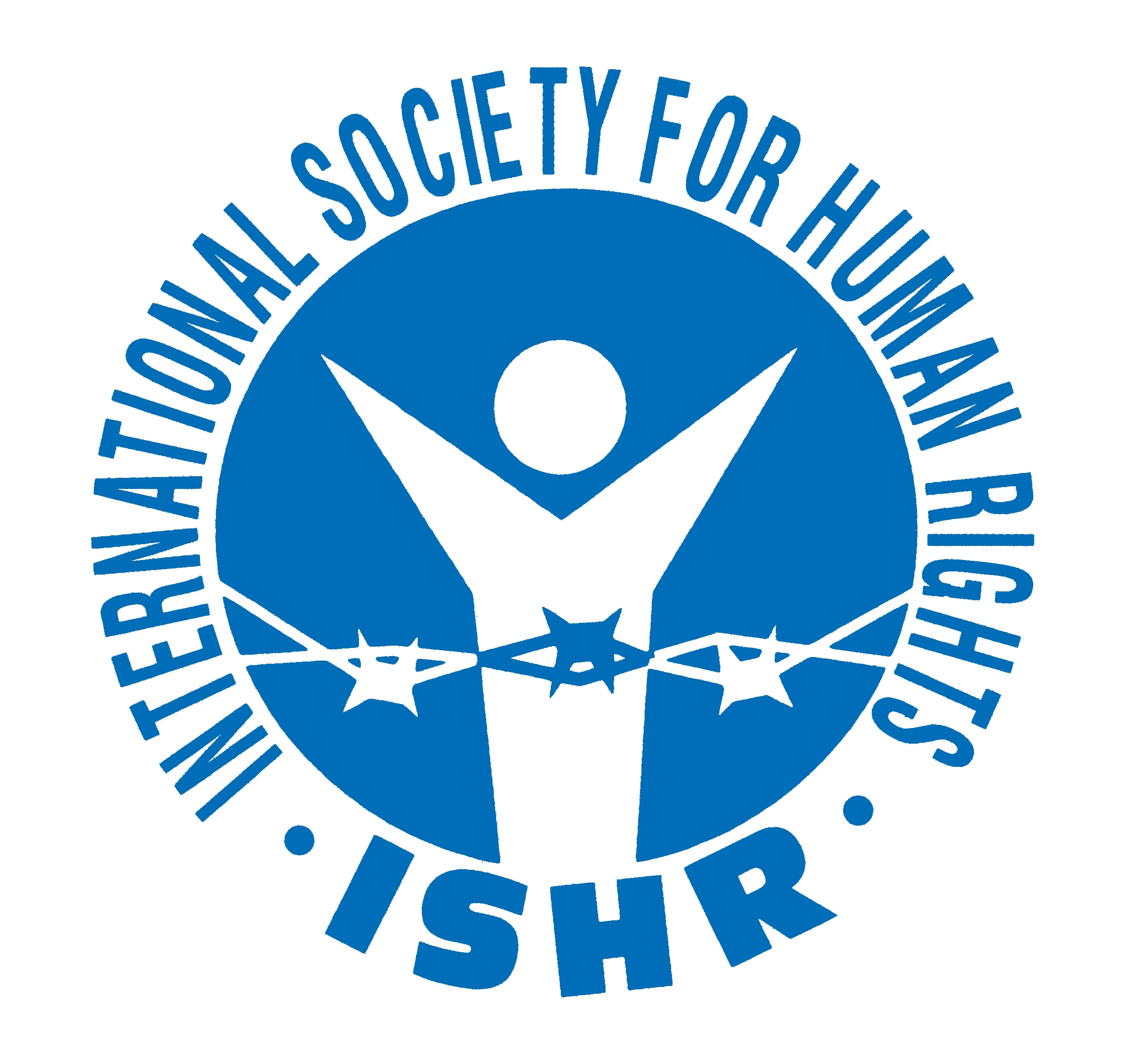
- Abbreviation: ISHR
- Formation: 1972; 54 years ago
- Type: international, non-governmental organization
- Headquarters: Frankfurt, Germany
- Members: 30,000–35,000
- President of the International Council: Thomas Schirrmacher
- Website: ishr.org

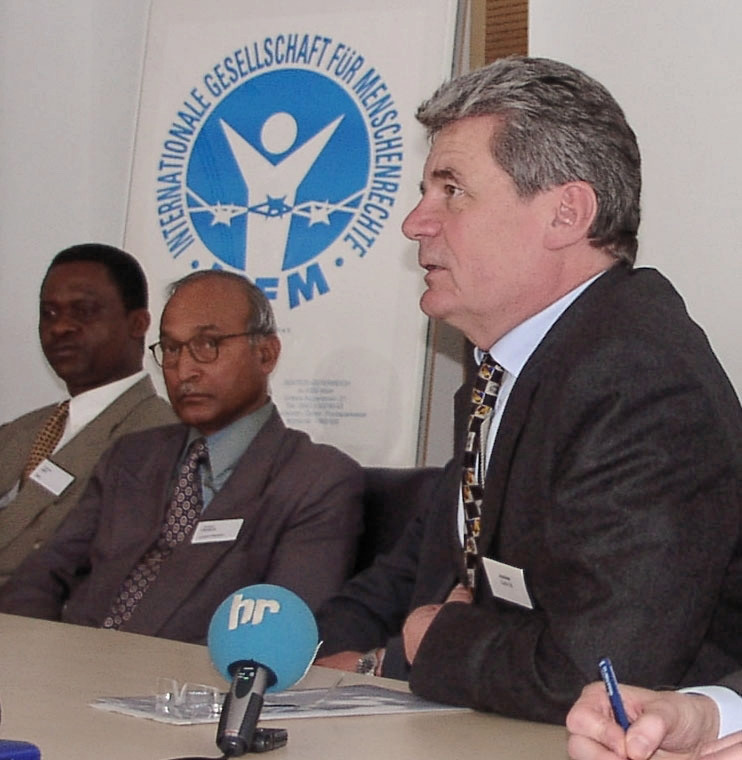
Human rights activist Joachim Gauck attending a press conference of the International Society for Human Rights

The International Society for Human Rights (ISHR) is an international non-governmental, non-profit human rights organization with Participative Status with the Council of Europe and is a member of the Liaison Committee of the Non-Governmental Organisations at the Council of Europe. The ISHR has observer status with the African Commission of Human and Peoples' Rights. It has associate status with the Department of Public Information of the United Nations and Roster Consultative Status with the United Nations Economic and Social Council (ECOSOC).

== History ==
The ISHR is seated in Frankfurt am Main, Germany, and was founded in West Germany on 8 April 1972 as the Gesellschaft für Menschenrechte (GfM). GfM was founded by thirteen people, including Cornelia Gerstenmaier and Gleb Rahr, with the aim of promoting international understanding and tolerance in all areas of culture and society and so was committed from its inception to only support individuals who share this principle and, consequently, strive non-violently for their rights. The initiator was Iwan I. Agrusow, a former Russian forced laborer, who had decided to stay in West Germany after World War II due to the treatment of former forced labourers in the Soviet Union (many of them were sent to Gulag upon returning).

The society became the International Society for Human Rights in 1982, with the founding of branches in Austria, Switzerland, the UK and France. Since then it has grown to include 47 National Sections, National Groups, Regional Committees and Affiliated Organisations worldwide.

During the Cold War, the International Society for Human Rights focused mostly on human rights violations in the states of the Eastern bloc. The German Democratic Republic (East Germany) declared the International Society for Human Rights an "enemy of the state" in 1975, and the Stasi launched a campaign against the human rights organisation, attempting to discredit it.

In 2003, the ISHR has focused on freedom of religion and freedom of press issues in countries such as Cuba, Vietnam and China.

Since 2009, the ISHR has developed a political sponsorship programme in which elected politicians advocate for individual political prisoners by raising their cases with governments and diplomatic missions and by raise public attention to their situation.

In 2017, ISHR coordinated humanitarian aid convoys to northern Iraq and facilitated medical assistance by organising missions of volunteer doctors to provide care for refugees in the region

Since February 2022, the organisation has provided humanitarian aid to Ukraine.

In March 2026, the Horki District Court in Belarus declared the social media pages of the ISHR to be "extremist".

== Activities ==
The Society publishes its own periodical Newsletter (in English) and in German "Menschenrechte". The president of the International Council of the ISHR is Prof Dr Dr Thomas Schirrmacher. Karl Hafen is treasurer, Marie Gerrard, Dr René Gomez, Dr Liubov Nemcinova, Dr Haydee Marin, Simone Schlegel and Prof Dr Andrey Sukhorukov are vice-presidents.
