= Kenneth Gentry =

American theologian (born 1950)

- Born: May 3, 1950 (age 76); Chattanooga, Tennessee, U.S.
- Education: Reformed Theological Seminary, Whitefield Theological Seminary
- Theological work
- Tradition or movement: Calvinism
- Main interests: Christian eschatology, Book of Revelation, theonomic ethics
- Notable ideas: The Book of Revelation is a forensic drama that presents God's divorce decree against Israel as he takes a new bride, the Christian church.

Kenneth L. Gentry Jr. (3 May 1950) is a Reformed theologian, and an ordained minister in the Reformed Presbyterian Church General Assembly. He is particularly known for his support for and publication on the topics of orthodox preterism and postmillennialism in Christian eschatology, as well as for theonomy and Young Earth creationism. He holds that each of these theological distinctives are logical and theological extensions of his foundational theology.

== Biography ==
Gentry was born in Chattanooga, Tennessee. He is married (since July 1971) and has three children and six grandchildren.

He received his B.A. in Biblical Studies from Tennessee Temple University (1973, cum laude). After graduating he enrolled at Grace Theological Seminary in Winona Lake, Indiana. After two years at Grace Seminary (1973–1975) he left dispensationalism, having become convinced of a covenant and Reformed theology. He transferred to Reformed Theological Seminary in Jackson, Mississippi (1975–1977). Upon completing studies at Reformed Theological Seminary he was awarded the M.Div. in 1977. After several years of pastoral ministry, he earned a Th.M. (1986) and a Th.D. (1987, magna cum laude) from Whitefield Theological Seminary, both in the field of New Testament.

While at Reformed Theological Seminary he studied under Greg L. Bahnsen, a leading presuppositional apologist. Though Gentry initially resisted the distinctive ethical and eschatological views of Bahnsen, he was eventually persuaded of both theonomic ethics and postmillennial eschatology and became a staunch co-defender of them with Bahnsen. Over the years he developed a close friendship with Bahnsen, often lecturing with him in conferences, co-writing a book with him (House Divided: The Break-up of Dispensational Theology), eventually joining the staff of Bahnsen's Southern California Center for Christian Studies, and finally contributing to the festschrift in honor of Bahnsen, titled: The Standard Bearer.

Gentry retired from full-time pastoral ministry in 2016 after serving more than thirty-five years in three conservative and Reformed denominations: The Presbyterian Church in America, The Orthodox Presbyterian Church, and The Reformed Presbyterian Church, General Assembly. He is the Director of GoodBirth Ministries, a non-profit religious educational ministry, "committed to sponsoring, subsidizing, and advancing serious Christian scholarship and education".

== Writings ==
Gentry is the leading contemporary theological expositor of the early-date of Revelation (prior to A.D. 70) by the Apostle John. The partial preterist paradigm is a different eschatological approach than that held by most American Dispensationalist Christians, who maintain that the Great Tribulation hasn't yet occurred.

Kenneth Gentry's works The Beast of Revelation and He Shall Have Dominion attempt to explain the identity of the Beast as a first-century historical character (Nero Caesar) and what God's true, hope-filled redemptive plan for humanity is (the postmillennial progress of the gospel). Gentry's work is considered by his followers to be important for soteriological reasons.

Gentry's work enfilades the error of much contemporary Christian pre-trib eschatology, also serving to argue that incorrect interpretation of the Bible is possible even by sincere experts.

Gentry is perhaps best known for his book Before Jerusalem Fell, which argues that the Book of Revelation was written before the destruction of Jerusalem in A.D. 70. He holds that many of the dramatic events in Revelation correspond to the persecution of Christians under the Roman imperium as well as to the Jewish War against Rome which resulted in the destruction of Jewish temple. This book is the published version of his doctoral dissertation in 1986 under the title The Dating of the Book of Revelation: An Exegetical, Theological and Historical Argument for a Pre-A.D. 70 Composition.

=== Revelation commentary ===
In 2024, Tolle Lege Press and Chalcedon Foundation jointly published Gentry's two-volume, 1872-page academic commentary on Revelation. It is titled: The Divorce of Israel: A Redemptive-Historical Interpretation. In this work, which follows an orthodox preterist analysis, Gentry presents evidence that "Babylon" (Rev. 16:19–19:2) is a metaphor for 1st century Jerusalem, and that the book's author John the Apostle is following the pattern of the Old Testament prophets in denouncing Jerusalem's unfaithfulness by such images (see especially Jer. 2–3 and Ez. 16).

Gentry holds that the theme of Revelation is Christ's judgment-coming against those who pierced him (Rev 1:7), and presents him as the "slain Lamb" (Rev 5:8,13; etc.) who wreaks vengeance upon 1st-century Jerusalem. He argues that the seven-sealed scroll is God's divorce decree against his unfaithful Old Testament wife (Israel) so that he might take a new bride, the Church (Rev. 21–22). Thus, Revelation dramatizes the transition from the old covenant, Temple-based, Judaic economy to the New Covenant, spiritual economy that includes all ethnicities, not just Jews.

Gentry sees strong similarities between Revelation and the Epistle to the Hebrews. Both works seek to demonstrate Christianity's superiority to Judaism by showing New Covenant Christianity fulfilling Old Covenant Judaism (Heb. 8:13; Rev. 2:9; 3:9; 11:1-2). He notes that both documents even end up pointing the reader to the New Jerusalem from heaven (Heb.12:22; Rev. 21:2), which represents Christianity. He also draws parallels in thought between the Gospel of Matthew and Revelation. He sees evidence for this in Matthew's strong imagery regarding old covenant Judaism's demise in the rise of Christianity (Matt. 8:10-12; 21:33-46; 22:1-13; 23:29-38).

=== Bibliography ===
- The Christian Case Against Abortion (Footstool, 1982, 1986). ISBN 978-1-877818-05-9 ISBN 1-87781805-4 OCLC 23656588
- The Christian and Alcoholic Beverages (Baker, 1986, 1990). ISBN 0-8010-3807-3
- The Charismatic Gift of Prophecy (Footstool, 1986, 1990 ISBN 1-877818-06-2 ISBN 978-187781806-6; Wipf & Stock, 1999).
- The Beast of Revelation (Institute for Christian Economics, 1989, 1994 ISBN 0-930464-21-4; American Vision, 2002 ISBN 0-915815-41-9).
- Before Jerusalem Fell: Dating the Book of Revelation (I.C.E.: 1989 ISBN 0-930464-20-6; Christian Universities Press: 1997 ISBN 1-57309-154-5 ISBN 978-157309154-1; American Vision: 1999 ISBN 0-915815-43-5).
- House Divided: The Break-up of Dispensational Theology, with Greg L. Bahnsen (I.C.E., 1989; 1997). ISBN 0-930464-27-3
- The Greatness of the Great Commission: The Christian Enterprise in a Fallen World (I.C.E., 1991, 1994). ISBN 0-930464-48-6
- He Shall Have Dominion: A Postmillennial Eschatology (I.C.E., 1992; 1997 ISBN 0-930464-62-1 ISBN 978-0930464-62-2; ApologeticsMedia, 2009 ISBN 0-9778516-7-2).
- Lord of the Saved: Getting to the Heart of the Lordship Debate (Presbyterian and Reformed, 1992). ISBN 0-87552-265-3
- God’s Law in the Modern World: The Continuing Relevance of Old Testament Law (P&R, 1992 ISBN 0-87552-296-3; I.C.E., 1997 ISBN 0-930464-77-X ISBN 978-0930464-77-6).
- The Great Tribulation: Past or Future? with Thomas D. Ice (Kregel, 1999). ISBN 0-8254-2901-3
- Perilous Times: A Study in Eschatological Evil (Covenant Media Foundation, 2000). ISBN 0-9678317-0-9
- God Gave Wine: What the Bible Says About Alcohol (Oak Leaf, 2001) [an expanded edition of the title on alcohol above]. ISBN 0-9700326-6-8
- Yea, Hath God Said? The Framework Hypothesis v. Six Day Creation with Michael R. Butler (Wipf & Stock, 2002). ISBN 1-59244-016-9
- As It Is Written: The Genesis Account: Literal or Literary? (Master, 2016) ISBN 0-890519013
- Have We Missed the Second Coming? A Critique of the Hyper-Preterist Error (Victorious Hope, 2017) ISBN 0-982620683
- Tongues Speaking: Its Meaning, Purpose, and Cessation (Victorious Hope, 2014) ISBN 0-982620675
- Covenantal Theonomy: A Response to T. David Gordon and Klinean Covenantalism (Covenant Media Press, 2006). ISBN 0-9678317-6-8
- Nourishment from the Word: Select Studies in Reformed Doctrine (Nordskog, 2008). ISBN 978-0-9796736-4-1
- A Biblical Defense of Predestination (ApologeticsGroup Media, 2008). ISBN 0-9778516-5-6
- The Book of Revelation Made Easy: You Can Understand Bible Prophecy (American Vision, 2008). ISBN 978-0-915815-91-3
- Navigating the Book of Revelation: Special Studies on Important Issues (GoodBirth Ministries, 2009). ISBN 978-0-9843220-0-8
- Postmillennialism Made Easy (ApologeticsGroup Media, 2009). ISBN 978-0-9825890-1-4
- Predestination Made Easy (ApologeticsGroup Media, 2009). ISBN 0-9825890-2-6
- God's Law Made Easy (ApologeticsGroup Media, 2010). ISBN 0-9825890-1-8
- Olivet Discourse Made Easy (ApologeticsGroup Media, 2010). ISBN 978-0-9825890-5-2
- Reformed Eschatology in the Writings of Geerhardus Vos, co-edited with Bill Boney (Axehead Press, 2024). ISBN 978-1-956329-23-0
- The Divorce of Israel: A Redemptive-Historical Interpretation (Tolle Lege Press and Chalcedon Foundation, 2024). ISBN 979-8-9857901-1-5

==== Contributions ====
- "Private Charity Should Care for the Poor" in The Welfare State (David L. Bender, ed.) (Greenhaven Press, 1982). ISBN 0-89908-313-7
- "Civil Sanctions in the New Testament," "Church Sanctions in the Epistle to the Hebrews," and "Whose Victory in History?" in Gary North, ed., Theonomy: An Informed Response (I.C.E., 1991). ISBN 0-930464-59-1
- "The Preterist View" in Four Views on the Book of Revelation (ed. Marvin Pate) (Zondervan, 1998). ISBN 0-310-21080-1
- "The Postmillennial View" in Three Views of the Millennium and Beyond (ed., Darrell Bock) (Zondervan, 1999). ISBN 0-310-20143-8
- "Reformed Theology and Six Day Creationism" in P. Andrew Sandlin, ed., Creation According to the Scriptures: A Presuppositional Defense of Literal, Six Day Creation (Chalcedon, 2001). ISBN 1-891375-12-1
- "A Revelation of the Revelation" and "Theonomy and Confession" in Robert R. Booth, ed., The Standard Bearer: A Festschrift for Greg L. Bahnsen (Covenant Media Foundation, 2002). ISBN 0-9678317-4-1
- "The Historical Problem with Hyper-Preterism" in Hyper-Preterism: A Reformed Critique, ed. Keith A. Mathison (P & R 2003). ISBN 0-87552-552-0
- "Agony, Irony and the Postmillennialist" and "Victory Belongs to the Lord" in Thine Is the Kingdom: A Summary of the Postmillennial Hope, ed. by Kenneth L. Gentry Jr. (Ross House, 2004). ISBN 1-891375-22-9
- "Pauline Communion v. Paedocommunion" in Joseph A. Pipa Jr. and C. N. Willborn, eds., The Covenant: God’s Voluntary Condescension (Presbyterian Press, 2005). ISBN 1-931639-06-X
- "Defending the Faith" in Bodie Hodge and Roger Patterson, eds., World Religions and Cults: Counterfeits of Christianity (Master, 2015). ISBN 0-89051903X
