= Henry George Oldfield =

English architect, antiquary and artist

Henry George Oldfield (fl. 1785–1805) was an English architect, antiquary, and artist.

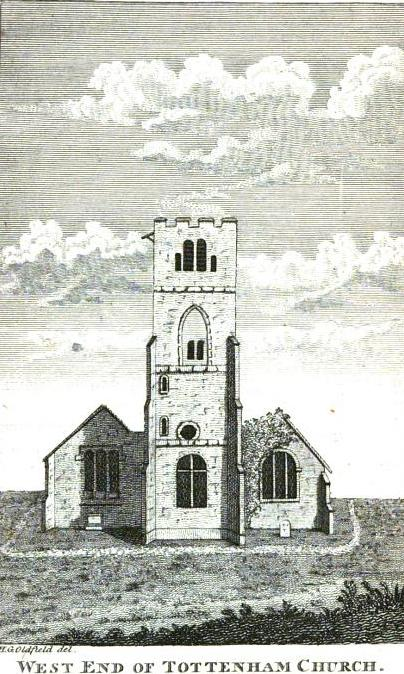
Engraving of the west end of Tottenham church, after a drawing by Oldfield.

== Life ==
In the 1780s he was architect to Princess Amelia, and exhibited architectural designs. In 1790 he was resident at Great Scotland Yard, moving to Finchley Common a few years later.

During the 1790s Oldfield made drawings in Hertfordshire, on commission; after the patron John Meyrick's death in 1805 they were bought by Thomas Dimsdale (Baron Dimsdale, a Russian title that he used in regular fashion by permission from 1813).

Later Oldfield had financial troubles, and was imprisoned for debt. Two other patrons were Richard Gough and Thomas Baskerfield.

== Works ==
He collaborated with Richard Randall Dyson on History and Antiquities of the Parish of Tottenham High Cross, London, 1790 (2nd ed. 1792); and was the author of Anecdotes of Archery, Ancient and Modern, London, 1791. To him also is attributed Camberwell Church, without place or date of publication.
