= Thomas Baskerfield =

English topographical artist and cartographer

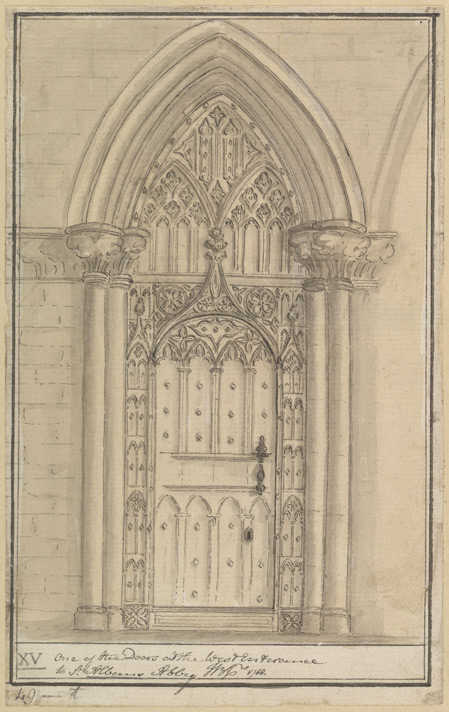
West Entrance, St Albans Abbey, 1788 drawing.

Thomas Baskerfield FSA (died 1816) was an English topographical artist and cartographer from Colchester, Essex, active from 1785 through 1816. There are 235 of his drawings and plans listed in the British Library Catalogue. With Richard Gough he was a patron of the artist Henry George Oldfield.

Following his death, his collection of maps, books and other valuable documents was put up for auction by John Sotheby in 1817.
