= Christine Schirrmacher =

German academic (born 1962)

- Born: May 2, 1962 (age 64); Lörrach, West Germany
- Citizenship: German
- Employer: University of Bonn
- Known for: Islamic studies
- Spouse: Thomas Schirrmacher

Christine Schirrmacher (May 2, 1962) is a German academic who specialises in Islamic studies. She is professor of Islamic studies at the University of Bonn and at the Evangelical Theological Faculty (ETF), Leuven.

== Biography ==
Christine Schirrmacher studied Islamic studies, history and Modern German literature in Gießen from 1982 to 1985 and Islamic studies, history and comparative religion in Bonn from 1985 to 1988. She graduated with an M.A. in 1988. She then completed her doctoral studies in Bonn, where, in 1991, she obtained her PhD with a thesis on the Christian-Islamic controversy in the 19th and 20th centuries and on the history of the impact of the so-called Gospel of Barnabas. In 2012, in the Department of Islamic Studies at the University of Bonn, she gave a presentation of her thesis on the topic of apostasy and human rights: “‘Let there be no Compulsion in Religion’ (Sura 2:256): Apostasy from Islam as Judged by Contemporary Islamic Theologians: Discourses on Apostasy, Religious Freedom, and Human Rights”.

She is professor for Islamic studies at the Institute for Oriental and Asian Studies at the University of Bonn and since 2005 professor of Islamic studies at the Evangelical Theological Faculty (ETF) in Leuven/Belgium. In 2013/2014 she held a professorship at the Institute of Human Geography (focus on political geography and conflict research) at the University of Tübingen. In 2013 and in 2023/2024 she was appointed substitute professor at the chair of Islamic studies at the University of Erfurt. and from 2003 to 2015 she was an associate lecturer in Islamic studies at Giessen School of Theology (FTH) in Gießen.

Schirrmacher is also scientific director of the Institute for Islamic Studies of the German Evangelical Alliance in Germany, Austria and Switzerland. In addition, she is member of the Academic Advisory Board of the “Academic Council of the Federation of German Criminal Investigators” (BDK), Berlin, and member of the steering committee of the “Center for Advanced Security, Strategic and Integration Studies (CASSIS)”, a research center of the University of Bonn.

From 2000 to 2023, she has taught annually at the “Akademie Auswärtiger Dienst” (Foreign Service Academy, formerly: Diplomat’s School) of the Federal Foreign Office in Berlin. She was member of the academic advisory board of the Federal Agency for Civic Education (BpB), Bonn/Berlin, from 2016 to 2024 a member of the board of trustees of the German Institute for Human Rights (DIMR), Berlin, and from 2006 to 2022 member of the board of trustees of the “Evangelische Zentralstelle für Weltanschauungsfragen” (EZW) of the Protestant Church (EKD).

Guest lectures, as well as study and lecture tours, took her to numerous Islamic countries. Schirrmacher is involved in leading dialogue initiatives (as of 2017) such as letters of response to the open letter A Common Word Between Us and You from 138 Muslim theologians to the leaders of Christian churches and at the invitation of the Yale Center for Faith and Culture of Yale University as well as at the follow-up conference “Loving God and Neighbor in Word and Deed: Implications for Muslims and Christians” or the “Berlin Forum for Progressive Muslims” (2011; 2013), a symposium of the Friedrich Ebert Foundation. She has also served as an expert for the Human Rights and Humanitarian Aid Committee of the German Bundestag.

== Selected publications ==
=== Books ===
- Schirrmacher, Christine (2008), Islam – An Introduction (PDF), Bonn: Culture and Science Publishing, ISBN 978-3-86269-025-1
- ——— (2008), Islam and Society: Sharia Law – Jihad – Women in Islam: Essays (PDF), Bonn: Culture and Science Publishing, ISBN 978-3-938116-64-7
- ——— (2008), The Islamic View of Major Christian Teachings: The Role of Jesus Christ, Sin, Faith, and Forgiveness – Essays (PDF), Bonn: Culture and Science Publishing, ISBN 978-3-938116-62-3
- ——— (2013), The Sharia: Law and Order in Islam (PDF), Bonn: Culture and Science Publishing, ISBN 978-3-86269-042-8
- ——— (2016), Political Islam – When Faith Turns out to be Politics, Bonn: Culture and Science Publishsing
- ——— (2016), "Let there be no Compulsion in Religion" (Sura 2:256). Apostasy from Islam as Judged by Contemporary Islamic Theologians. Discourses on Apostasy, Religious Freedom, and Human Rights (Habilitation), Eugene/Oregon: Wipf & Stock
- ——— (2016), Political Islam – When Faith Turns Out to Be Politics (PDF), Bonn: Culture and Science Publishing, ISBN 978-3-86269-113-5
- ——— (2017), Can Freedom Be Unlimited? Examples of Censorship in Middle Eastern Societies in the 19th and 20th Centuries, Berlin: EB-Verlag
- ——— (2020), Islam and Democracy: Can They Be Reconciled? (PDF), Bonn: Culture and Science Publishing (VKW), ISBN 978-3-86269-193-7
- ———; Schirrmacher, Thomas (2020), The Oppression of Women: Violence – Exploitation – Poverty, Bonn: Culture and Science Publishing (VKW), ISBN 978-3-86269-192-0

=== Articles ===
- Schirrmacher, Christine (1999), "The Influence of Higher Bible Criticism on Muslim Apologetics in the Nineteenth Century", Jacques Waardenburg (Ed.). Muslim Perceptions of Other Religions, New York/Oxford: Oxford University Press.
- ——— (2002), "Human Rights and the Persecution of Christians in Islam", Thomas Schirrmacher (Eg.). A Life of Transformation: From Politician to Good Samaritan: A Festschrift for Colonel V. Doner, Hamburg: RVB.
- ——— (2009), "Apostasy and Sharia" (PDF), MBS Texte 121 (Pro Mundis).
- ——— (2009), "Islam in Europe: The Challenges Facing State, Society, Religion, and the Legislator", Art & Thought, 48 (90).
- ——— (2009), "Muslim Immigration to Europe and Its Challenge for European Societes", William Dembski, Thomas Schirrmacher (Ed.). Tough-Minded Christianity: Honoring the Legacy of John Warwick Montgomery, Nashville (TN): B&H Academic Publ.
- ——— (2010), "Defection from Islam: A Disturbing Human Rights Dilemma" (PDF), International Journal for Religious Freedom
- ——— (2011), "Islamic human rights declarations and their critics: Muslim and non-Muslim objections to the universal validity of the Sharia" (PDF), International Journal for Religious Freedom.
- ——— (2013), "Apostasy: What do contemporary Muslims theologians teach about religious freedom" (PDF), International Journal for Religious Freedom.
- ——— (2017), "Freedom or Censorship: Opposites? Discourses on Freedom, Freedom of Religion, and Freedom of Belief in Middle Eastern Societies of the 20th Century", Christine Schirrmacher, Haggag Ali, Stephan Conermann (Ed.). Can Freedom be Unlimited? Examples of Censorship in Middle Eastern Societies in the 19th and 20th Centuries, Berlin: EB-Verlag.
- ——— (2020), "Leaving Islam", Daniel Enstedt, Göran Larsson, Teemu T. Mantsinen (Ed.). Handbook of Leaving Religion. Brill Handbooks on Contemporary Religion, Leiden: E. J. Brill.
- ——— (2020), "Discussing Religious Freedom in the 21st Century: Political or Theological Debate?", Carlos Ramírez, Michael Schulz (Ed.) Aftershocks of an Event, Heidelberg: Universitätsverlag Winter.
- ——— (2021), "Christianity and the Essential Characteristics of Democracy", Thomas K. Johnson, C. Holland Taylor (Ed.). God Needs No Defense. Reimagining Muslim-Christian Relations in the 21st Century, Bonn: Culture and Science Publishing (VKW).
- ——— (2024), "'God Created Them from a Single Soul' (Surah 4:1). The Creation of the World and the Creation of Man: Apologetic Argument for the Equality of Women in Feminist Qur'ānic Exegesis", Marion Gymnich, Julia A. B. Hegewald (Ed.). Images and Stories of the Origins of the World and of Humankind, Tübingen: Mohr Siebeck.
- ——— (2025), "Representatives of Progressive Qur'ān Hermeneutics in the West", Georges Tamer (Ed.). Handbook of Qur'ānic Hermeneutics, Vol. 5: Contemporary Qur'anic Hermeneutics, Berlin: Walter de Gruyter.
