= ACTS Academy of Higher Education =

Educational institution in Bangalore, India

Coordinates: 12.8791°N 77.6905°E

ACTS Academy of Higher Education (AAHE) is an educational institution in Bangalore, India, which provides theological education through regular and distance-education mode. ACTS is an acronym for Arts, Crafts, Trade, and Studies. The Academy was founded by Ken Gnanakan, a well known Christian theologian from India who served as General Secretary of Asia Theological Association for several years. ACTS also founded the William Carey University in Shillong, Meghalaya.

== ACTS Institute ==
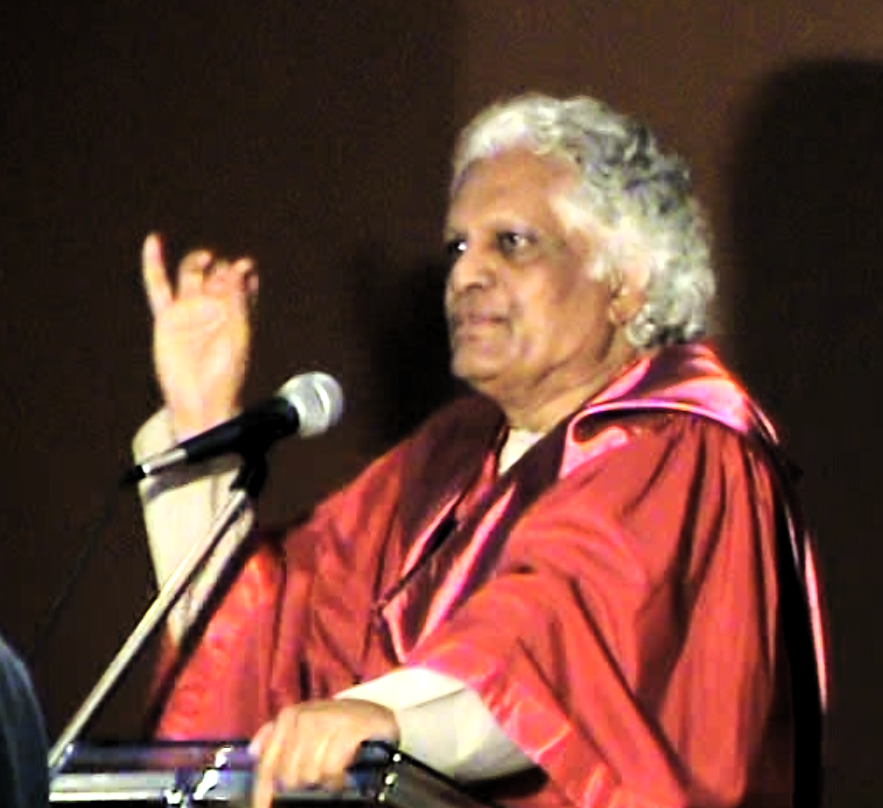
Chancellor Ken Gnanakan giving the keynote address at the AAHE convocation in 2007.

ACTS Institute is one of the several institutes and social projects of ACTS Academy of Higher Education. Starting in a rented house in Koramangala area of Bangalore in July 1970, it integrated vocational and theological training by linking the dignity of labour and Christian mission. By 1980, it had moved into a 4-acre campus on the outskirts of the Hosur Road and "provided facilities to construct workshops for skilled training, accommodation for the staff and students" until 2000. In 2001, it moved to a new campus of 14 acres in Rayasandra, a rural area. The ACTS Institute offered a range of residential academic programs, including the Certificate in Ministry, Diploma of Ministry, Bachelor of Ministry, and Master of Ministry. Its technical training programmes were accredited by the National Open School of the Government of India, State technical board, Pitman of UK and City and Guild of UK. Technical courses offered included Carpentry, Tailoring and Dress-making, Community Health, Secretarial Practice, Computer Application, Electrical, Agriculture, Sheet-metal work, Lathe works, Home Management and Screen and Off set Printing. Currently, ACTS Academy offers the residential programmes of Master of Divinity and Master of Theology

== William Carey University ==
In 2005, the Government of Meghalaya authorized ACTS to establish the William Carey University in Shillong by the Gazette of Meghalaya No.76 William Carey Act 2005.

== Distance Education ==
ACTS Academy of Higher Education offers Master of Theology and Doctoral programs through its Asian Institute of Theology. It is considered to be one of the few, along with TAFTEE (The Association for Theological Education by Extension) that offer accredited higher theological education by distance method.

== Accreditation and Memberships ==
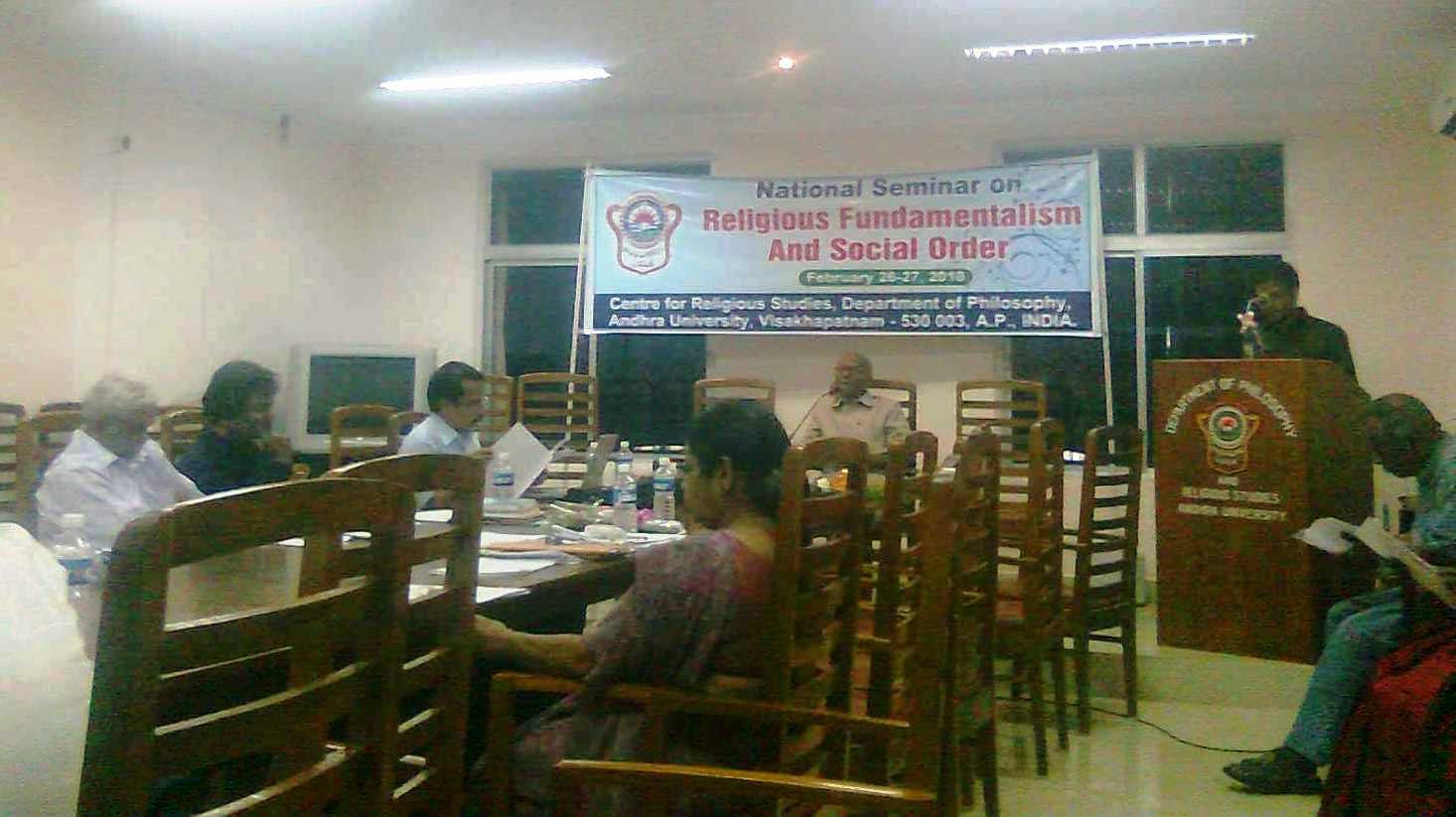
Department of Religious Studies, Andhra University, National Seminar 2010. Seated on left: Richard Gnanakan, Siga Arles, Paul Mohan Raj

The institution offers degrees that are accredited by the Asia Theological Association India. It played a main role in the founding of the International Council for Higher Education (ICHE), Zurich, Switzerland, of which it remains a member. The institution is affiliated with the Department of Religion and Philosophy at Andhra University, where it also holds a national seminar on the theme of religion and philosophy every year.
