= Evangelical Theological Faculty =

Belgian Evangelical institute

Coordinates: 50°52′5″N 4°39′50″E

- Evangelische Theologische Faculteit
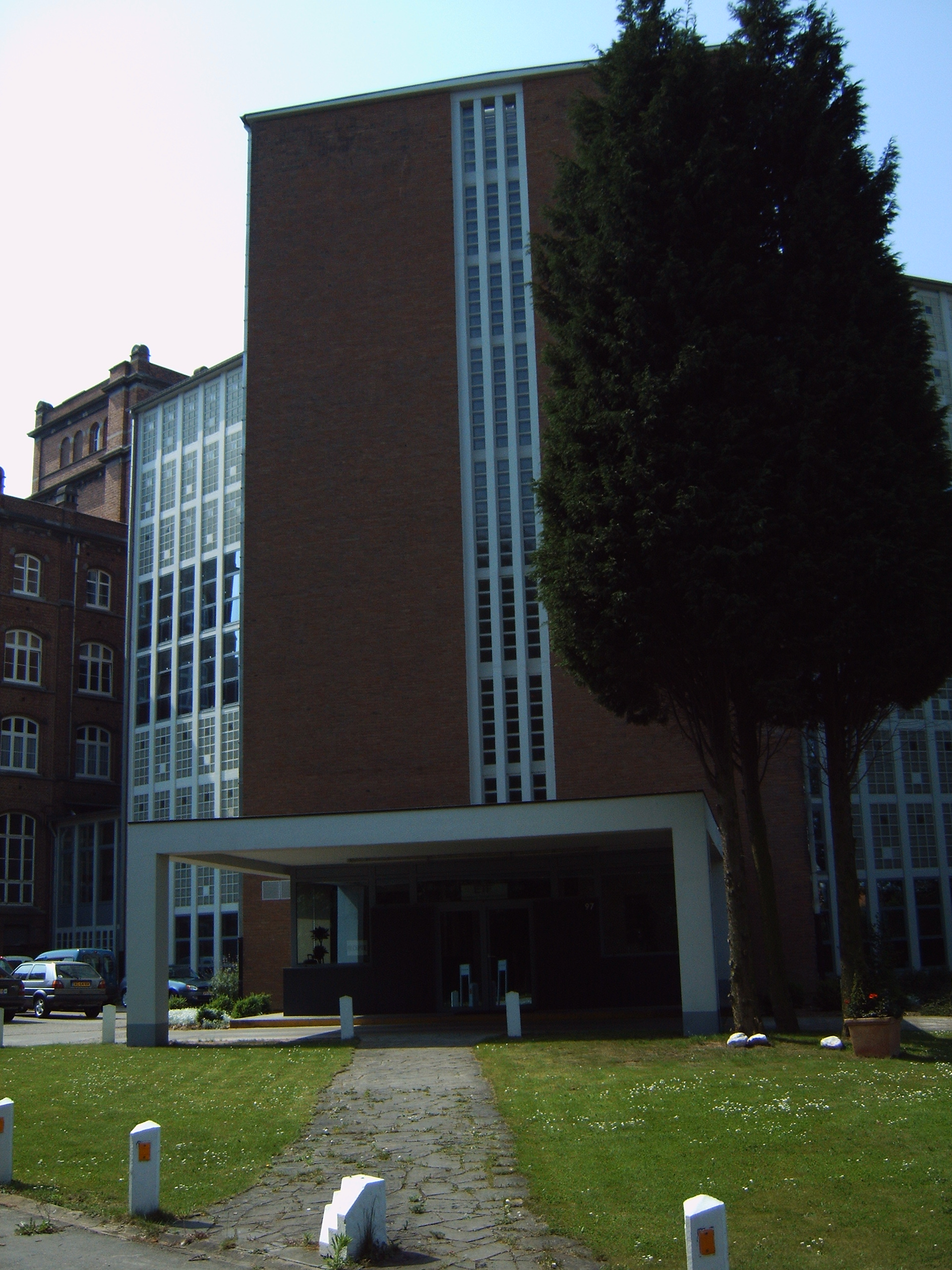
- Motto: Fides Quaerens Intellectum
- Motto in English: Faith Seeking Understanding
- Type: Private
- Established: 1919
- Rector: Jos de Kock
- Dean: Jelle Creemers (2022– )
- Academic staff: 59
- Administrative staff: 13
- Students: 224 (2022)
- Location: Leuven, Belgium
- Language: Dutch and English
- Website: etf.edu
- Data as of 2022

The Evangelical Theological Faculty (Dutch: Evangelische Theologische Faculteit, Leuven, abbreviated as ETF) is a Protestant Evangelical Theological Institute/University in Leuven, Flanders, Belgium and is recognised by the Federal Government of Belgium to award degrees and doctorates. It is an Evangelical faculty which complements the Faculty of Theology and Religious Studies at the Catholic University Leuven. The ETF offers four degree programs: a Dutch-taught Bachelor of Arts in Theology and Religious Studies program, an English-taught Master of Arts in Theology and Religious Studies program, a Dutch-taught Teacher's degree program, and an English PhD program. Moreover, the ETF also offers a Bachelor's and Master's part-time program named ETF Open University.

== History ==
The academic institution originates in the Bible Institute Belgium. The institute was founded in 1919, as an originally-named 'Institut Biblique de la Mission Belge Evangélique' in Brussels. In 1922, the Dutch-speaking department was launched: 'Bijbelinstituut België'.

From 1965, the institution grew rapidly. This rapid growth was thanks to foreign students who came to study because of tri-lingual education, and hence in 1971 the program became recognised by the Belgian government. The institute moved to a former Jesuit college in Heverlee, Leuven in 1975.

In 1981, the 'Evangelische Theologische Faculteit' was founded as an academic program of the Bible Institute, which in 1983 was recognised by the Federal Government of Belgium to award licentiate- and doctoral degrees. A year later, the ETF awarded its first licentiate degree, and after two more years its first doctoral degree. In 1992, the French-speaking department IBB was terminated and relocated. In 1996, the licentiate degree was taught in English entirely.

After the implementation of the BAMA-structure by the Flemish government in 2003, the government reaffirmed ETF's right to award recognised degrees of Bachelor, Master and Doctor in Theology and Religious Studies. Thus the former educational programs were phased out and reshaped into a three-year Bachelor's program and a two-year Master's program. Eventually these two programs were accredited by the Accreditation Organisation of the Netherlands and Flanders (NVAO) in 2007.

In 2008, the Flemish Government awarded the ETF with a partial education subsidy, and by 2012 the Flemish government also approved funding of research. The university is also funded by tuition fees and donations.

=== Reckoning and Accreditation ===
On 19 June 2006, the final report of the educational inspection Theology and Religious Studies (2005) was submitted to the Flemish Interuniversitary Board. The report consists of the bachelor and master programs of three theological faculties in Flanders, ETF being one of them. Hence, based on its positive verdict of the ETF, the faculty was accredited by the Nederlands-Vlaamse Accreditatieorganisatie (NVAO), the organisation involved in accrediting institutions of higher education in the Netherlands and Flanders.

In October 2014, the faculty received an excellent report of the inspection committee of the Board of Flemish Universities and Universities of Applied Sciences (VLUHR). The theology degrees were both awarded the score "good," which means they systematically supersede the basic qualifications of quality. Hence, it is one of the highest ranking theology faculties in Flanders and the Netherlands.

The committee praised the ETF for preserving her Christian identity "and simultaneously having an open outlook to societal developments." In the introductory comments Prof. Dr Em. Henk Witte, president of the inspection committee, that both faculties [ETF and the Faculty of Theology and Religious Studies at the Catholic University Leuven] deal in their own way with the tension between identity and openness, and know how to persevere in such tension, and endeavor to fertilize it. This way, students are prepared for the context in which they will work."

Following this report the Accreditation Organisation of the Netherlands and Flanders (NVAO) renewed the faculty's accreditation until 2023.

== Degree programs ==
The full-time bachelor's degree in Theology and Religious Studies is taught in Dutch and requires three years of study. The course consists of three specialisations: Bible and Theology, Church and Pastoral Ministry, and Religion and Education. The degree is accredited by the Accreditation Organisation of the Netherlands and Flanders (NVAO).

The full-time master's degree program in Theology and Religious Studies is taught in English and requires two years of studying. The course offers three specialisations: Bible and Theology, Church and Pastoral Ministries, and Religion and Education. If a prospective graduate student holds a professional bachelor's degree in theology or religious studies, the applicant will need to complete a so-called "linking program." If the student holds an academic bachelor's degree in any other field, a preparatory program will need to be completed. The degree is accredited by the Accreditation Organisation of the Netherlands and Flanders (NVAO).

The teacher training degree program is linked to the master's degree program. The program can either be taken during or after the master's degree program. After obtaining both the Master's and teacher's degree the graduate can work as a teacher of Protestant and Evangelical religious education.

The PhD program consists in its core of conducting scientific research leading to a dissertation, under guidance of a supervisor.
