= World Evangelical Alliance Theological Commission =

Theological commission

The Theological Commission of the World Evangelical Alliance (WEA) (formerly World Evangelical Fellowship, WEF) was established in 1974 with Bruce Nicholls as director and John Langlois as administrator. It was built upon the Theological Assistance Program (TAP) which had been created following a decision of WEF in May 1968 to support and strengthen theological education in the Third World.

== History ==
TAP had already become a catalyst for developing programs of Theological Education by Extension in several areas, assisting faculty development and publishing materials for theological educators and students. An association to promote its work in Asia (later Asia Theological Association) was also established in 1971. The successful inauguration of these activities meant that the WEF Theological Commission could be established at the 6th General Assembly of WEF in mid-1974, with an eleven-man international executive.

The first full scale consultation was held in London September 1975 with the theme, "The Church and Nation". In subsequent years several consultations were conducted, sometimes in cooperation with other bodies, such as the Lausanne Theology Working Group (LTWG), with the papers usually being published in book form. One of the important functions of the Commission was to encourage the formation of organisations to accredit evangelical theological education, which it 1980 formed their own association, the International Council of Accrediting Associations (ICAA) (International Council for Evangelical Theological Education). Important consultations were held in 1980 with multiple conferences on topics such as development and the simple life style, which was followed in 1982 by the influential Consultation on the Relationship between Evangelism and Social Responsibility (CRESR). Equally important was the 1983 conference on the "Nature and Mission of the Church".

The Executive met annually, with a larger number of people forming the Commission, meeting triennially. Bruce Nicholls continued his role as Executive Director until 1986. During this time he travelled extensively around the world, networking, developing ways of assisting theological education and raising funds.

Another important function of the TC was the establishment of Study Units (Faith and Church, Ethics and Society etc.) headed up by key theologians such as Dr Donald A Carson and Dr Ronald Sider. Their consultations and publications contributed greatly to the development of evangelical thinking and action around the world. It also inaugurated the journal of social ethics, Transformation, which later passed to other auspices. The TC also engaged in a long dialogue with the Roman Catholic Church.

Its publication work developed strongly in the 1977 with the creation of the journal, Evangelical Review of Theology (ERT), which was originally designed as a digest of international evangelical theology in various fields particularly aimed at seminaries and church leaders in the Third World who were unable to access a wide range of journals. Already a quarterly newsletter, Theological News, had been in circulation since the inception of the organisation.

When Dr Bruce Nicholls concluded his leadership of the Theological Commission in 1986 to spend his remaining years before retirement in pastoral work at a parish in New Delhi, he was succeeded by Dr Sunand Sumithra (1986–1989) and later by Dr Bong Rin Ro (1989–1996). Chairmen of the TC Executive were Dr Byang Kato (1975), Dr A. Clemenhaga (1975–1980), and Dr David Gitari (1980–1986). With the appointment of a new Executive Director, Dr Peter Kuzmic (1986–1996) took over as chair, and after a ten-year period of office, he was succeeded by Dr. Rolf Hille in 1996. For most of his term, Hille has served the dual role of Chair and Executive Director, apart from 1998-2001 when Dr James Stamoolis was Executive Director, and then again from 2007 when Dr David Parker took up that role.

At its peak, the TC grew to about fifty members with members drawn from all continents, but in more recent years it has been about twelve in number with an annual paid extended membership scheme in operation which enables individuals, seminaries and national evangelical fellowship to participate directly in its work. Consultations and related publications have focused on "The Unique Christ in our Pluralistic World" (1992), "Faith and Hope for the Future" (1996).

Since about 2000, the WEA Theological Commission has conducted short consultations on topics such as fundamentalism, the church, theological education, the future of evangelical theology, and evangelical political engagement; it has published material on the environment and eschatology, conducted dialogues with other religious groups, and worked with other evangelical bodies to develop theological materials to pursue its mission of promoting "biblical truth by networking theologians to serve the church in obedience to Christ".

As of November 2017, Dr. Thomas Schirrmacher is Chair and Dr. Rosalee Veloso Ewell is Executive Director of the WEA TC.

== Sources ==
- Parker, David; "Discerning the Obedience of Faith" A Short History of the World Evangelical Alliance Theological Commission (An Official History), Theological Commission, 2005
