= Friedrich Wilhelm Schirrmacher =

German historian (1824–1904)

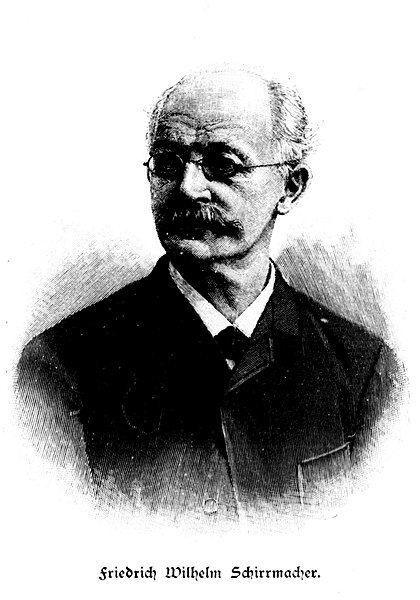
Friedrich Wilhelm Schirrmacher

Friedrich Wilhelm Schirrmacher (28 April 1824, Danzig – 19 June 1904, Rostock) was a German historian. He is best known for the discovery of the original files and protocols of the Marburg Colloquy. The original texts are reprinted until today.

== Biography ==
Schirrmacher was the son of the school principal Carl Friedrich Schirrmacher and his wife Charlotte von Modrach. He assed his matriculation examination in Danzig, Prussia in 1845. From 1845 to 1847, Schirrmacher studied history and philosophy in Berlin and from 1846 to 1847 at the University of Bonn. He thereafter returned to Berlin.

He completed doctoral studies under Leopold von Ranke in 1848 and passed the state teacher's examination in 1849. During the years 1849–54 he was an auxiliary teacher at a Berlin high school and was also employed as a schoolmaster (1854–66). Beginning in 1863 Schirrmacher worked as a history professor at the Royal Liegnitz Ritter Akademie (knight academy) in Silesia. While in Liegnitz he began publishing his multi-volume work on Kaiser Friedrich II, for which he was awarded the Wedekind Foundation prize from the University of Göttingen. This resulted in his being called to teach at the University of Rostock (1866). He taught there for 38 years as a full professor.

In 1866, while he was in Rostock, he brought out the city of Liegnitz registry book covering the time up to 1455. In addition, he turned his attention to areas relating to Spanish research. In 1881 the first volume of his history of Spain was published. It covered the time period beginning with the 12th century. Between the years 1890 and 1902 three additional volumes followed, which continued coverage of Spanish history up to 1516.

Schirrmacher received numerous honors and was conferred diverse orders. Beginning in 1874 he held the position of second librarian, then first and senior university librarian, and from 1869 onward he was a member of the board of examiners for teaching posts at upper-level schools. Beginning in 1871 he was director of the academic numismatic collection, and from 1878/79 onward he held the rectorship of the university and was dean of the university's philosophical faculty in 1871/72 and in 1893/94.

Schirrmacher was particularly well known for his various works on the House of Hohenstaufen. In Reformation research he gained recognition for discovering and publishing the records and minutes of the Religious Colloquium of Marburg.

== Honours ==
For his contribution to science he received several awards:

- 1871 Knight 1. Class of the Order of Saint Michael (Bavaria)
- 1879 Memorial Medal of Frederick Francis III, Grand Duke of Mecklenburg-Schwerin
- 1898 Commander of the House Order of the Wendish Crown

== Books ==
- Kaiser Friderich der Zweite, Göttingen 1859–1865.
- Johann Albrecht I. Herzog von Mecklenburg, Wismar 1885.
- Die Entstehung des Kurfürstenkollegiums. 1876. Nachdruck Bonn 2003, ISBN 3-932829-72-7.
- Allgemeine Staatengeschichte 1902 (several parts)

== See also ==
- Thomas Schirrmacher, philosopher and Schirrmacher's great-grandson
- Thomas Schirrmacher (2001). "Friedrich Wilhelm Schirrmacher". In Bautz, Traugott (ed.). Biographisch-Bibliographisches Kirchenlexikon (BBKL) (in German). Vol. 18. Herzberg: Bautz. cols. 1226–1235. ISBN 3-88309-086-7.
