= Whitefield Theological Seminary =

Theological seminary in Florida

Coordinates: 28.0490°N 81.9322°W

- Type: Seminary
- Established: 1980
- Religious affiliation: Reformed Presbyterian Church General Assembly
- President: Jason L. Bradfield
- Dean: Richard Glau
- Location: Lakeland, Florida, United States
- Campus: Distance Education
- Website: whitefield.edu

Whitefield Theological Seminary is an unaccredited theological seminary in Lakeland, Florida, United States. A conservative confessional institution, it teaches from the Reformed perspective of Protestant Christianity. The seminary holds to the Westminster Standards which includes the Confession of 1647, Larger and Shorter Catechism. Courses of study are offered on-site at the seminary's Lakeland offices but primarily through distance education.

The seminary is affiliated with the Association of Reformed Theological Seminaries. Its website states that "all degree programs are designed for use in conjunction with church-related ministries". The school derives its name from 18th century revivalist George Whitefield. Founder and first president Kenneth Gary Talbot died on August 18, 2022. Jason L. Bradfield has served as interim president since September 5, 2022.

== Notable alumni ==
- Gary DeMar
- Kenneth Gentry
- George Grant
- Francis Nigel Lee
- Stephen Mansfield
- Keith Mathison
- R. C. Sproul, Sr.
- Thomas Schirrmacher
