= List of University of North Carolina at Wilmington alumni =

This is a list of notable alumni who attended the University of North Carolina Wilmington (UNCW).

- Lavonne J. Adams (1986), poet and author
- Claudia Bassols (transferred), actress
- Brandon Beane (1998), Buffalo Bills general manager
- John R. Bell, IV (2001), majority leader of the North Carolina House of Representatives
- Brett Blizzard (2003), professional basketball player
- Mark Byington (1998), college basketball coach
- Devontae Cacok (2019), Israeli Basketball Premier League, and formerly NBA, basketball center
- John Calipari (transferred), basketball coach
- Craig Callahan (2003), professional basketball player; Most Valuable Player of the Czech Republic's National Basketball League
- Kona Carmack (2000), model and actress
- Marc Antonio Carter (2008), professional basketball player
- Martha Cheney (1975), author
- Billy Donlon (1999), college basketball coach
- Matt Fish (1992), professional NBA basketball player
- John Goldsberry (2006), professional basketball player
- Carl Hart (transferred), professor at Columbia University
- Dax Harwood, professional wrestler
- Chris Hatcher (2006), Major League Baseball player
- Bill Haywood (1964), professional baseball player
- Kirsten Holmstedt (2006), author and journalist
- Martin Jarmond, athletic director at UCLA
- Phoebe Jeter, US Army air defense artillery officer
- Greg Jones, Major League Baseball player
- Rick Jones (1975), baseball coach
- Brad Knighton (2007), professional soccer player
- Anna Kooiman (2005), reporter
- Todd Lickliter (transferred), basketball coach
- Matt Lutz (2001), actor
- Jill Mikucki (1996), microbiologist, Antarctic researcher
- Brandon Miller (2012), professional soccer player
- Hekuran Murati (2010), minister of finance, labor and transfers of the Republic of Kosovo
- Derek Nikitas, author
- Evan Phillips (2015), Major League Baseball player
- Bevin Prince (2003), actress
- John Raynor (2006), Major League Baseball player
- Cecil R. Reynolds (1975), psychologist
- Brian Rowsom (1989), professional basketball player
- Bill Saffo, mayor of Wilmington
- Terry Schappert, television host, commentator
- Adam Smith (born 1992), basketball player for Hapoel Holon in the Israel Basketball Premier League
- Cody Stanley (2010), Major League Baseball player
- John M. Tyson (1974), judge on the North Carolina Court of Appeals
- Skeet Ulrich (did not graduate), actor
- Shaun Utterson (2012), professional soccer player
- Jacob VanCompernolle (2014), professional soccer player
- Christopher Warner (1991), Anglican bishop
- Carl Willis (1990), Major League Baseball coach
- Christian Worley (2020), civil rights activist
