= Restoration Anglican Church =

Anglican church in Arlington, Virginia, US

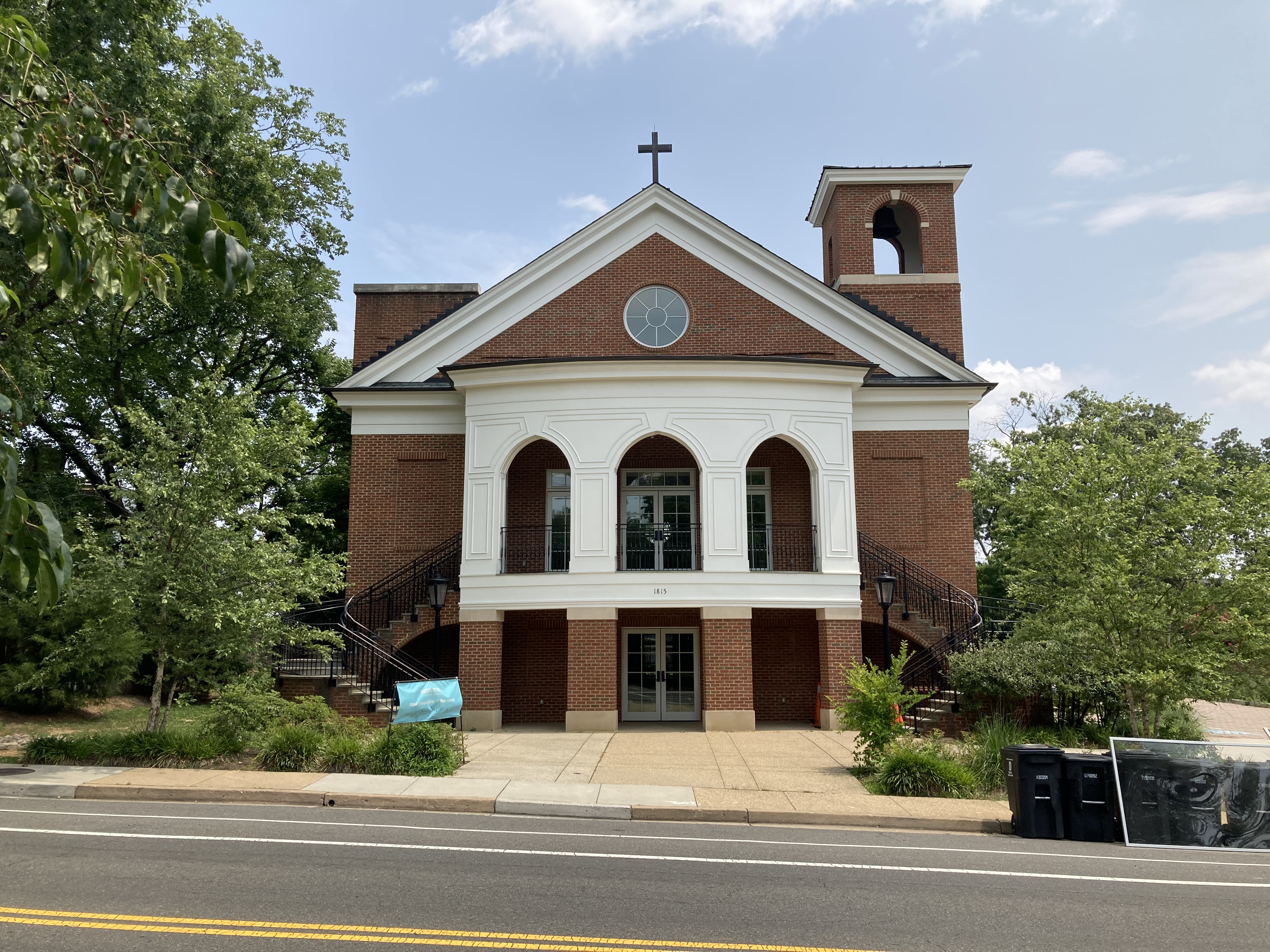
- Restoration Anglican Church
- 38.8934°N 77.1073°W
- Location: Arlington, Virginia
- Country: United States
- Denomination: Anglican Church in North America
- Website: restorationarlington.org

History
- Founded: 2009

Architecture
- Style: Neo-Georgian
- Years built: 2013–14
- Completed: 2014
- Construction cost: $4.3 million ($5.85 million in 2025) (including land acquisition)

Specifications
- Capacity: 375

Administration
- Diocese: Mid-Atlantic

Clergy
- Rector: The Rev. David Hanke

Restoration Anglican Church is an Anglican church in Arlington County, Virginia, United States. It was planted in 2009 by the Falls Church Anglican and by 2024 had become the second-largest church in the Diocese of the Mid-Atlantic and one of the largest congregations in the Anglican Church in North America. The congregation purchased a former Baptist church building and replaced it with a 375-seat sanctuary in the Cherrydale neighborhood that was completed in 2014. In 2015, Restoration launched an immigration legal aid clinic that was spun off as a freestanding nonprofit in 2019 managing up to 1,000 asylum cases.

== History ==
Restoration Anglican Church was planted by the Falls Church Anglican in January 2009. It began renting space from Trinity Baptist Church on Quincy Street in Arlington's Cherrydale neighborhood, and it bought the building in 2010 when Trinity disbanded. Trinity Baptist had been founded in 1930 and built its building in 1941, but its attendance had fallen to just 12 people. In disbanding, it used the $1 million ($1.48 million in 2025) purchase price from Restoration to establish a fund that will be managed by Northern Virginia network of Baptist churches to support Baptist ministry in the region.

By 2012, Restoration had grown to attendance of 450 people across three services, and the church began making plans for a larger building on the site than the 150-seat Trinity building. The next year, Restoration demolished the older building and began erecting a new and larger facility. Restoration's building was opened and dedicated in September 2014.

In 2018, Restoration planted a daughter church, Incarnation Anglican Church, in South Arlington. By 2023, it had become the second-largest church in the Diocese of the Mid-Atlantic (after the Falls Church Anglican). In 2024, it was the 13th-largest church in the ACNA with nearly 700 in average Sunday attendance.

== Architecture ==
Restoration's building seats 375 people in the nave on the main floor with space on the ground floor for children's activities and classrooms. The cost of land acquisition and construction was $4.3 million ($5.85 million in 2025).

Due to the small footprint of the church's property, it has limited onsite parking, and street parking in the surrounding neighborhood is limited as well. For Sunday services, Restoration operates a shuttle service to the parking lot at nearby Washington-Liberty High School.

== Ministries ==
Restoration's churchmanship is low church with "folksy" music and clergy who rarely wear vestments. The church operates cell groups that relaunch on a trimester basis to facilitate a steady flow of newcomers joining.

In 2015, the church started a legal aid clinic that provides pro bono legal services to asylum seekers. The volunteer-driven ministry, Restoration Immigration Legal Aid (RILA), was spun off as a freestanding nonprofit organization in 2019 and stated as of 2026 that it had a staff of 14 and a volunteer base of 100 attorneys managing 1,000 active cases. It continued to hold its clinics at Restoration. In 2026, RILA was a co-plaintiff in a lawsuit challenging cuts by the U.S. Department of Health and Human Services to legal aid for refugee claims. RILA has been awarded grants from the Arlington County Board's Opportunities Grant Program and ACT for Alexandria's Fund for Racial Equity.

Restoration was one of eight churches in an Arlington-based network providing rental assistance during the COVID-19 pandemic.
