= William Corcoran Eustis =

Captain in the United States Army

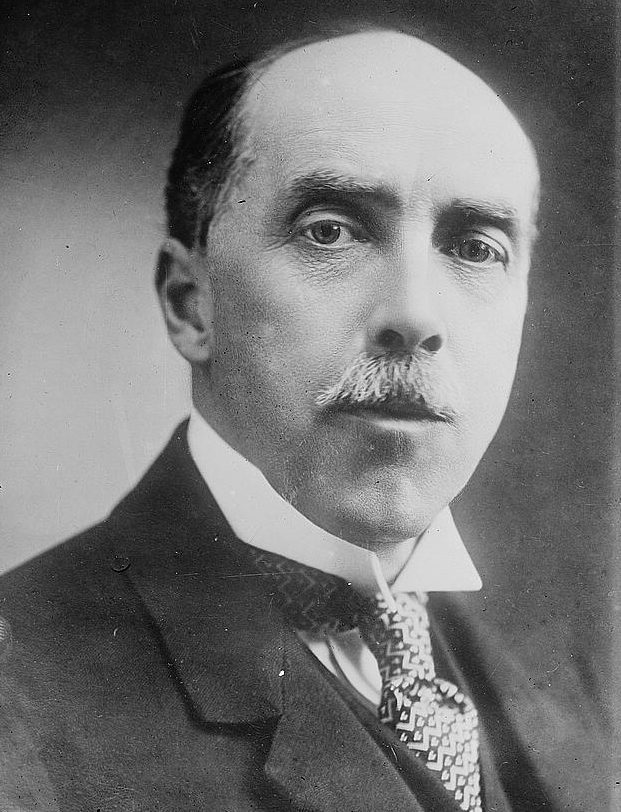
- Born: July 20, 1862; Paris, France
- Died: November 24, 1921 (aged 59); New York City, U.S.
- Resting place: Oak Hill Cemetery; Washington, D.C., U.S.
- Education: University of Virginia; Harvard Law School
- Occupation: Soldier
- Spouse: Edith Livingston Morton (m. 1900)
- Children: 5
- Parent(s): George Eustis Jr. Louis Morris Corcoran Eustis
- Relatives: George Eustis Sr. (grandfather); William Corcoran (grandfather); Wendy Pepper (great-granddaughter)

William Corcoran Eustis (July 20, 1862 – November 24, 1921) was a scion of wealthy families who became a diplomat then captain in the United States Army and the personal assistant to General John J. Pershing during World War I. Eustis chaired the inauguration committee for the first inauguration of Woodrow Wilson in 1913 and started the Loudoun Hunt in 1894.

== Early life ==
He was born on July 20, 1862, in Paris to former U.S. Representative George Eustis Jr. (1828–1872) and Louise Morris "Lulie" (née Corcoran) Eustis (1838–1867), who married in April 1859. His brother was George Peabody Eustis and his younger sister was Louise Marie Eustis, who married polo player Thomas Hitchcock Sr.

His grandfather George Eustis Sr. was Chief Justice of the Louisiana Supreme Court, and his grandmother Clarisse (née Allain) Eustis was the only surviving child of banker and philanthropist William Wilson Corcoran, co-founder of the Riggs Bank, and Louis (née Morris) Corcoran, a daughter of naval officer Charles Morris. His paternal uncle was U.S. Senator and Ambassador to France James Biddle Eustis.

Eustis was educated at Shadwell School in Albemarle County, Virginia, the Hanover Academy in Hanover County, Virginia, before attending the University of Virginia from 1880 to 1882. He then attended Harvard Law School, graduating in 1887.

== Career ==
After graduating from Harvard, "much of his time was taken up with the management of his large estate." While Joseph Hodges Choate was the U.S. Ambassador to the United Kingdom, Eustis served as the Third Secretary of the United States Embassy in London from 1901 to 1902.

During the first World War, William was a personal secretary to General John J. Pershing, achieving the rank of captain.

== Personal life ==
On April 30, 1900, he married Edith Livingston Morton (1874–1964), a descendant of many prominent families, including the Livingston family of New York. Edith, a daughter of Anna Livingston Reade (née Street) Morton and Levi Parsons Morton, the 22nd U.S. Vice President under Benjamin Harrison, served as a member of the memorial commission for the District of Columbia War Memorial. Together Edith and William were the parents of five children, including:

- Helen Louise Corcoran Eustis (1902–1979)
- Margaret Morton Eustis (1903–1977), who married David Edward Finley in 1931. He was the first director of the National Gallery of Art, the founding chairman of the National Trust for Historic Preservation, chairman of the U.S. Commission of Fine Arts, and founding chairman of the White House Historical Association.
- Morton Corcoran Eustis (1905–1944), who was killed in action at Domfront, Normandy during World War II. Before the War, he had been the associate editor of the Theatre Arts Magazine in New York.
- Edith Celestine Eustis (1912–1936), who died, unmarried, aged 23. In 1932, she had been engaged, but not wed, to Lieut. Hubert Winthrop Chanler, son of Winthrop Astor Chanler.
- Anne Livingston Eustis (1915–1989), who married Grenville Temple Emmet Jr. (1909–1989), son of U.S. Minister to the Netherlands Grenville T. Emmet in 1937.

He laid the cornerstone for the Corcoran Gallery of Art on May 10, 1894, which his grandfather funded. He was a member of the Metropolitan Club, the Alibi Club, the Knickerbocker Club, and the Meadowbrook Club on Long Island. Eustis and his wife Edith were dedicated patrons of the Church of Our Saviour, the historic congregation on the Oatlands property

=== Thoroughbred racing ===
William Eustis owned and raced Thoroughbred horses. In addition to riding polo ponies, he was a very capable amateur Thoroughbred rider. As part of the undercard for the May 29, 1897 Belmont Stakes won by Scottish Chieftain at Morris Park Racecourse, William Eustis rode Hawarden in the one mile Amateur Cup. A race for "gentlemen riders," he finished third to winner Diversion ridden by Foxhall Keene. Among the stakes races Eustis won with some of his horses were the Advance Stakes and the Pansy Stakes in 1899.

=== Passing ===
Eustis died at the Hotel Belmont in New York City, en route to the former country home of his father-in-law in Rhinecliff, New York, on November 24, 1921, of pneumonia due to complications related to the Spanish Flu, which he contracted during the war. He was interred at Oak Hill Cemetery in Washington, D.C.

=== Descendants and legacy ===
Eustis purchased and restored Oatlands Plantation in Leesburg, Virginia. Following the death of his widow in 1964, their daughters donated the property to the National Trust for Historic Preservation.

Through his youngest daughter Anne, he was a great-grandfather to Wendy Pepper, a contestant on season 1 of Project Runway.
