= Church of Our Saviour, Oatlands =

Anglican church in Leesburg, Virginia, US

Coordinates: 39.0543°N 77.6157°W

Church of Our Saviour at Oatlands
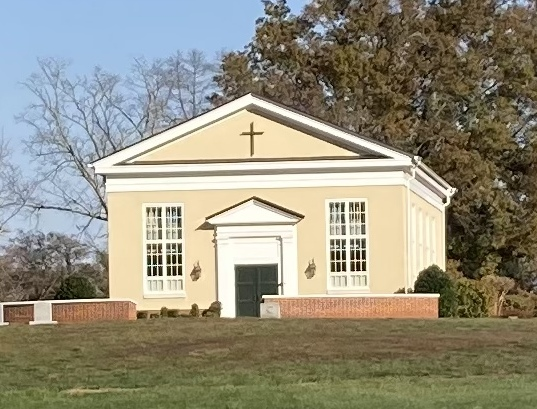
- Church of Our Saviour's 2016 building pictured in November 2023.
- Church of Our Saviour at Oatlands
- Location: Leesburg, Virginia
- Country: United States
- Denomination: Anglican Church in North America; Reformed Episcopal Church
- Website: oursaviouroatlands.org

History
- Founded: c. 1871
- Dedicated: 2016

Administration
- Diocese: Central States

Clergy
- Rector: The Rev. Jonathan Kell
- Church of Our Saviour
- U.S. Historic district – Contributing property
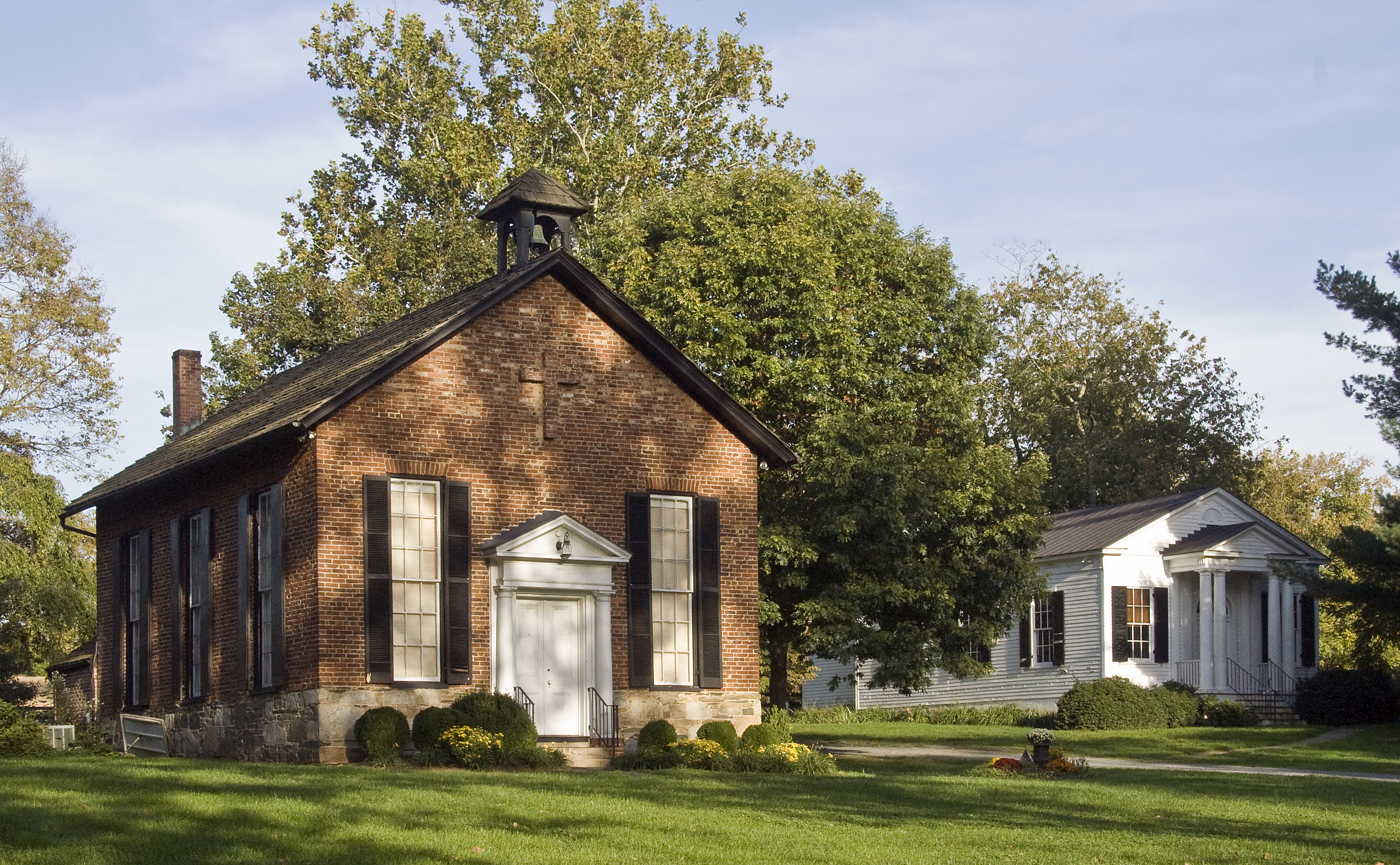
- The historic church and parish hall on the Oatlands plantation site.
- Built: 1878
- Part of: Oatlands Historic District (ID74002327)
- Added to NRHP: May 3, 1974

The Church of Our Saviour at Oatlands is a Reformed Episcopal parish located south of Leesburg, Virginia. Founded in 1871 as a parish of the Episcopal Diocese of Virginia, it met for most of its history in a historic church building on the grounds of the Oatlands plantation. The congregation elected to leave the Episcopal Church during the Anglican realignment and in 2016 relocated to a new building a mile north of the original historic church. It is noted for its use of the 1928 Book of Common Prayer.

== History of the parish ==
While the parish's beginnings are not well documented, services are believed to have begun during the Civil War in a log cabin on the Oatlands plantation that also housed the blacksmith's shop. The congregation would have been the only place of worship within a five-mile radius. The earliest church records date to January 1871, when the Rev. Sewall Hepburn—the future grandfather of Katharine Hepburn—was called to assist the rector of St. James Episcopal Church in Leesburg. Hepburn's ministry area included Christ Church in what is now Lucketts, Catoctin Union Church near Hamilton and the congregation at Oatlands.

By 1875, Hepburn noted that the Oatlands congregation had grown to the point of building its own church and that the then-twice-monthly services would be insufficient. Oatlands' owner, George Carter II, paid $700 in cash and materials to build a simple brick church on the plantation starting in 1876; the church was consecrated by Bishop of Virginia Francis Whittle on August 21, 1878. By this time, Hepburn had left and the Oatlands church remained under the care of the Rev. Richard Terrell Davis, rector of St. James in Leesburg.

The congregation fell on hard times in the 1890s with Davis's death and the sale of Oatlands by the Carter family to Stilson Hutchins in 1897. In 1903, however, Hutchins sold Oatlands to William Corcoran Eustis and Edith Livingston Morton Eustis. The Eustis family became significant benefactors of the church, repairing the building, installing a balcony and adding a chancel with a memorial stained glass window. In 1907, Church of Our Saviour was transferred to the parish of Emmanuel Church in Middleburg alongside the Aldie church. Our Saviour and the Aldie parish built a shared rectory for the use of the incumbent. In 1915, recognizing the role of the Oatlands church as hub of community activity, Edith Eustis built a wooden parish hall that still stands next to the brick church.

In the mid-20th century, the congregation became a battleground in the conflict between theological liberalism and conservatism. The Rev. Spence Dunbar, rector in both Middleburg and Oatlands, was locked out of the Oatlands church after congregants objected to Dunbar's liberal teachings. In 1948, the Oatlands church was transferred back to the St. James parish. By the late 1960s, however, the number of communicants had declined to just eight. The church survived due to support from David E. Finley Jr. and his wife, Margaret Eustis Finley (daughter of William and Edith Eustis), the owners of Oatlands. The Finleys provided funds to replace the church's roof, renovate the parish hall and install a new organ. When the rector of St. James recommended the Oatlands church be closed, and then that services be held only every other week, Finley—as senior warden—asked the dean of Virginia Theological Seminary to provide a seminarian to lead morning prayer services three weeks a month. Starting in 1966, seminarian Elijah White, a native of Leesburg, was assigned to assist. Attendance grew under White's evangelical ministry.

In 1972, due to a change in Episcopal Church canon law, Our Saviour achieved independent parochial status from St. James by virtue of paying for its own clergy to provide “recognizable Episcopal services” regularly. The Our Saviour congregation elected to use the 1928 Book of Common Prayer under the leadership of the Rev. Frederick Hughes Evans, a semi-retired part-time ministry. After Evans' resignation from the Episcopal Church due to the ordination of women, and shortly before Finley's death in 1977, Finley successfully urged the Our Saviour vestry to call the now-ordained Elijah White, back from service as a missionary in Fiji, as rector. White would remain as rector until 2012. He presided over restoration of the buildings (including the addition of running water in 1978), added Sunday school and confirmation classes and introduced the Festival of Nine Lessons and Carols. After the adoption of the 1979 Book of Common Prayer, White received permission from the bishop of Virginia to use the 1928 liturgy alongside offering at least one service according to the now-mandatory 1979 book.

Amid the growing acceptance in the Episcopal Church of theological liberalism and recognition of LGBT clergy during the late 20th and early 21st centuries, Our Saviour became part of the Anglican realignment movement. The congregation voted to disaffiliate from the Diocese of Virginia in 2006, alongside the Falls Church, Truro Church, Church of the Epiphany and five others, and join the Convocation of Anglicans in North America. After years of litigation in which the congregation had spent $400,000 in efforts to retain a property that White estimated as less than that sum, the congregation ended its litigation in 2011. The congregation continued to meet in the historic church while it sought to acquire new premises.

Thanks to bequests and trusts from church members, including White and his widow, Anita Graf White, the congregation purchased 26 acres two miles north of Oatlands. Under the leadership of the Rev. James Basinger, the congregation built a new colonial revival structure there. On August 21, 2016–138 years to the day after the historic church's dedication—the new structure was consecrated by the Rt. Rev. Daniel Morse, marking the church's reception into the Reformed Episcopal Church's Diocese of the Central States. Post-COVID, under the leadership of the Rev. Jonathan Kell, the church became the largest in its diocese by attendance, attracting a number of congregants from nearby Patrick Henry College.

== Architecture ==
=== Historic church ===
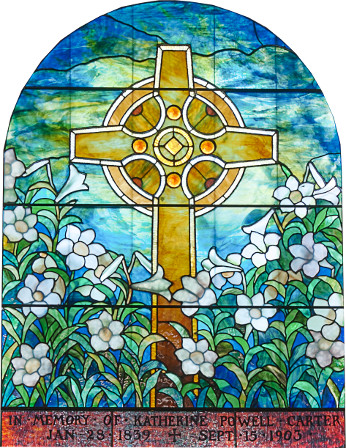
Stained-glass altar window in the historic church in memory of Katherine Powell Carter. A copy of this window sits above the altar in the 2016 church.

The church was originally built as a simple rectangular building. The rubble stones of the foundation are dressed to have a smooth face brought up to the window sill level. A bead of mortar across irregular-sized stones was intended to simulate regular ashlar coursing.

The red brick bearing walls start with a header course atop the foundation wall. Wooden sills are set in this header. As the courses of brick rise, each sixth course is set in common bond. In the west gable wall, a five-foot high brick cross projects from the wall. An externally mounted cross was not used due to objections over its anglo-Catholic connotations in the low-church Diocese of Virginia. Later additions include the small chancel added by the Eustises and a choir dressing room south of the chancel and a furnace room north of the chancel, all added in red brick.

The west door consists of two wood doors, each with recessed panels, framed by a simple, pedimented wood frontispiece attached to the face of the brick wall. Two Tuscan columns on a low plinth support the undecorated entablature. The church's cornice is formed by large-scaled crown moldings, and a scrolled iron bracket is connected to the tympanum. A hipped-roof belfry surmounted by a cross tops the building.

All windows except for the arched stained-glass altar window, are double-hung wooden windows measuring three feet wide and fifteen feet tall. Each double-hung window is flanked by fixed louvered shutters painted green. On the inside of the church is a gallery supported by Tuscan columns at the west end that encloses a narthex.

The chancel is nine feet wide and has a barrel-vaulted ceiling. The arched opening to the chancel is trimmed by flat wood banding and Doric pilasters at either side. The chancel's wooden floor is two steps up from the main wood floor, and an additional stone step leads to the altar rail and altar.

=== The 2016 church ===
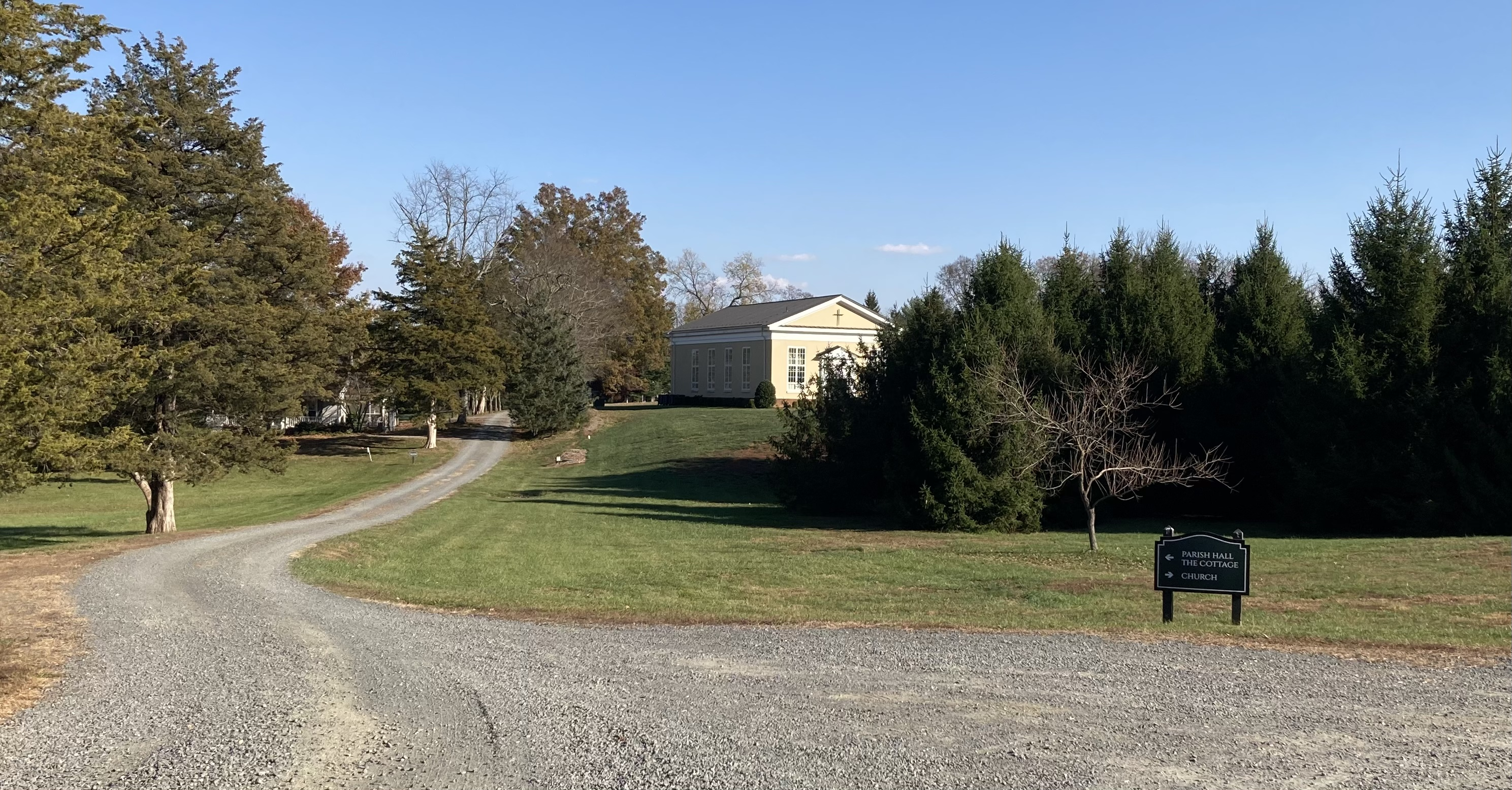
Church of Our Saviour viewed from James Monroe Highway in 2023.

The 2016 church, while considerably larger and of modern construction, duplicates the rectangular shape, colonial revival design and large windows of the historic church. The new church also replicated 15 brass memorial plaques from the historic church as well as the altar window, and added new plaques in memory of Elijah and Anita Graf White, Anton Schefer and Virginia Bowie, whose gifts and bequests had made the new property possible.
