= Christ Church Accokeek =

Historic Anglican church in Maryland, US

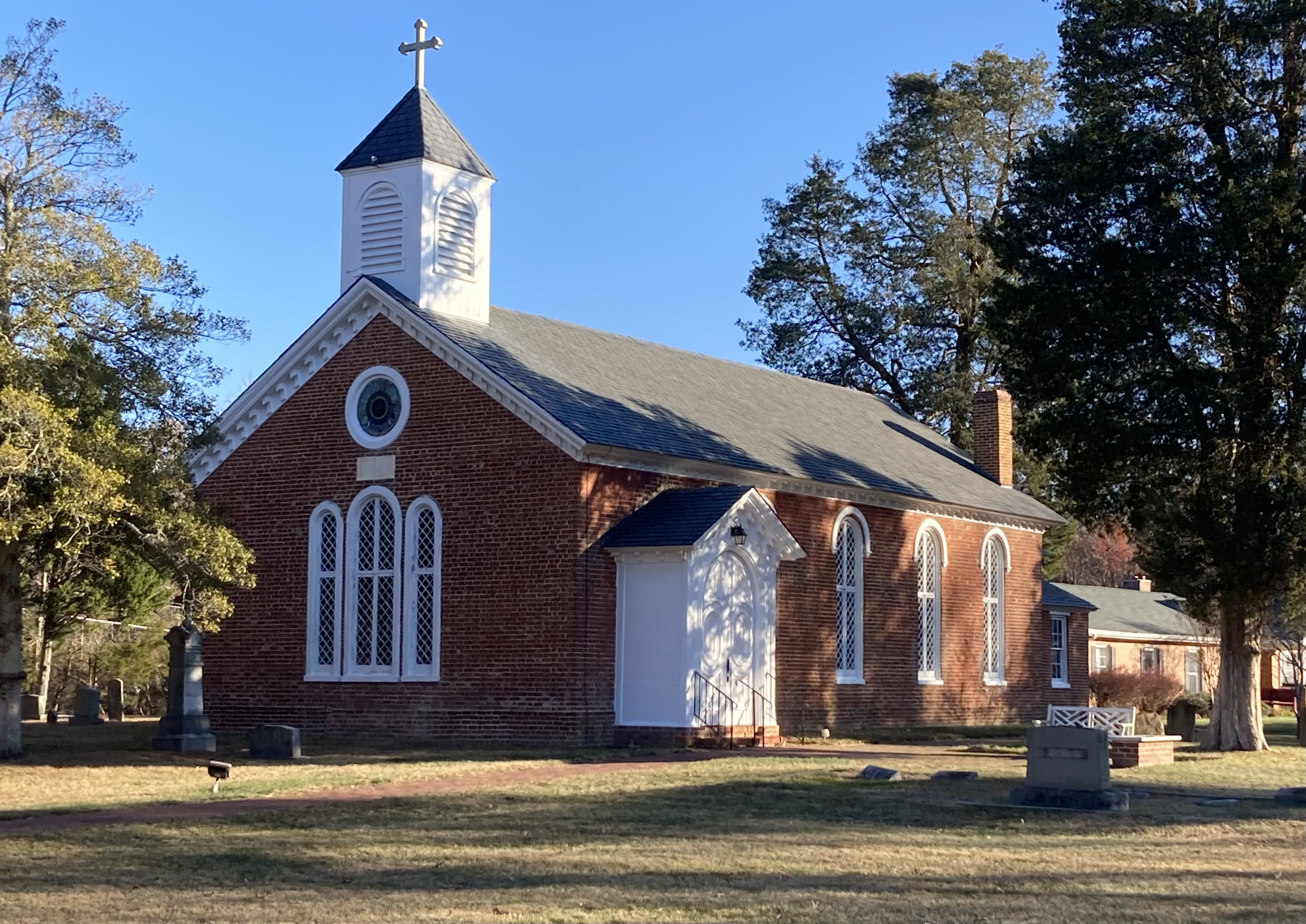
- Christ Church Accokeek
- 38°40′38″N 77°01′12″W
- Location: Accokeek, Maryland
- Country: United States
- Denomination: Anglican Church in North America
- Website: www.accokeekchurch.org

History
- Founded: 1696

Architecture
- Style: Georgian; Italianate
- Years built: 1747

Administration
- Diocese: Mid-Atlantic

Clergy
- Rector: The Rev. Brian Vander Wel

Christ Church Accokeek is an Anglican parish church and cemetery in Accokeek, Maryland. Founded in 1698 as a chapel of ease, the present brick structure dates to 1747 (with substantial reconstruction and addition in the 1850s) and the cemetery to 1775. In 2021, two decades after a well-publicized conflict with the Episcopal Diocese of Washington, the congregation amicably left the Episcopal Church and joined the Anglican Church in North America. The church is listed on the Maryland Historical Trust's Maryland Inventory of Historic Properties.

== History ==
=== Early history ===
The church's origins are in King George's Parish (also known as Piscataway Parish and now known as St. John's Episcopal Church), centered on Broad Creek and one of the original 30 Church of England parishes established in the Maryland colony in 1692, stretching as far north as the Pennsylvania border. Christ Church was founded in 1696 as a chapel of ease for residents of the Accokeek area, located about eight miles south. Congregants met in homes before establishing a frame church.

By 1744, the original frame building had decayed, and the General Assembly funded the construction of a brick chapel on three acres at the present-day site. Construction began in 1747 and the new church was opened in January 1748. The oldest grave in the Christ Church cemetery dates to 1775.

=== Reconstruction and renovation ===
Christ Church was granted parish status in 1823. On Christmas Eve 1856, the 1748 building burned, leaving only the exterior brick shell. The church raised $2,500 for reconstruction and the renovated building was rededicated on June 18, 1857. The renovation added a chancel, a porch, a tower, and hood moldings on the rounded windows, adding certain Italianate features to the original Georgian colonial chapel. The interior renovation and orientation facilitated high church worship associated with the Tractarian movement.

The parish's original rectory was built in 1841, but it burned in 1932, resulting in the destruction of nearly 90 years of parish records. The present rectory was rebuilt after the fire.

=== New growth ===
In 1957, the Rev. Roland Jones—whose mother's ancestors had been part of Christ Church for centuries—was called as the 33rd rector of the parish, which was linked with St. John's Chapel in nearby Pomonkey, Maryland. Christ Church was at that time dependent on the Episcopal Diocese of Washington for funds, and the buildings were deteriorating. Christ Church's parish hall was heated by wood stoves; the bell tower was rotten; the roof was sagging; and the floors were termite-infested. Black snakes and wasps also invaded the church.

Jones began a program of restoration. As the church was repaired, and as Prince George's County suburbanized and grew in population, Christ Church once again grew and became self-supporting. During Jones' tenure, in 1961, Christ Church opened the Canterbury School on the church grounds. Jones also presided over the racial integration of Christ Church.

Toward the end of Jones' rectorate, in the late 1960s, the interior of the church was renovated again, with a center aisle replacing two side aisles in the nave. The renovation added hexagonal brick flooring that duplicated the church's early flooring material.

Canterbury School was closed by the Christ Church vestry in 2000 after a severe decline in tuition-paying attendance and accusations of financial mismanagement on the part of school officials and the school board.

=== Anglican realignment ===
In December 2000, the Christ Church vestry elected the Rev. Samuel Edwards as rector after a three-year vacancy. After the 30-day period under which a diocesan bishop may block an appointment had elapsed, the vestry extended Edwards a contract in January 2001. In February 2001, some in the Diocese of Washington raised concerns about the views held by Edwards—who had previously been executive director of the Anglo-Catholic group Forward in Faith North America—on women's ordination and homosexuality. Bishop of Washington pro tempore Jane Dixon asked Edwards to withdraw and, on March 8, formally objected to Edwards' appointment on the grounds that he would not submit canonically to her as a female bishop. Edwards replied that he would accept her administrative authority but not her sacramental role and that he could not receive Holy Communion from Dixon.

The vestry rejected Dixon's ability to object to its election of Edwards outside the 30-day window and proceeded to install Edwards as rector. In May 2001, Dixon visited Christ Church and was not allowed to enter by the senior warden; she conducted a service outdoors and said that retired Bishop of Washington Ronald Haines would serve as priest-in-charge.

Presaging future disputes in the Anglican realignment about alternative episcopal or primatial oversight, at the same service, retired Bishop of Quincy Edward MacBurney read a letter from Bishop of Fort Worth Jack Iker responding to the Christ Church vestry's request for "episcopal oversight and protection." Iker's letter, read by MacBurney, stated: "After a great deal of prayer and reflection, I have decided to agree to your request, effective immediately. . . . [This arrangement] will continue for as long as the current circumstances make it necessary."

Dixon filed suit in federal court on June 26, 2001, to remove Edwards from Christ Church. The federal district court affirmed Dixon's authority to block Edwards' appointment, and in June 2002, a federal appellate court affirmed the ruling. In August 2002, Christ Church elected the Rev. Stephen Arpee as rector, and the vestry settled its dispute with Dixon and her successor as Bishop of Washington, John Chane. In June 2002, Edwards had left the Episcopal Church for the Anglican Province of Christ the King and later for the Roman Catholic Church.

In 2007, Christ Church elected the Rev. Brian Vander Wel as its 43rd rector. In April 2021, the church reached a confidential settlement with Bishop Mariann Edgar Budde to purchase the property and disaffiliate from the Diocese of Washington. Christ Church subsequently affiliated with the ACNA Diocese of the Mid-Atlantic under Bishop John Guernsey. “After a lengthy process of prayerful discernment, respectful conversation, and engagement with the Presiding Bishop’s Office and the Standing Committee, the leadership of the Diocese of Washington, working together with the leadership of Christ Church Accokeek, has decided to sell the property of Christ Church Accokeek to a new corporate entity that is not in union with the Diocese. We have reached this decision in a spirit of friendship," Budde said.

== Architecture ==
The colonial main block of Christ Church, built starting in 1744, was rectangular and laid in Flemish bond. The south and north facades each have five bays with round-topped windows; the south facade is identical to the north facade with the exception of an entry vestibule replacing one window.

The 1857 reconstruction of the church added several Italianate features to the building, including a wooden cupola, a bracketed cornice, hood moldings for the windows, and the entry vestibule with round-arched entry door. The 1857 renovation also added a chancel to the east end of the church, laid in 7:1 common bond with a cornice identical to the main block and a tripartite round-arched window above the altar. Indoors, the west end of the nave includes a wooden gallery accessed by a spiral staircase.

According to the Maryland Historical Trust, "[t]he building is historically significant for its long history in Accokeek and its place as one of the early Episcopal churches in Southern Maryland."
