= Truro Church =

Truro Church may refer to:

- Truro Church in Fairfax, Virginia, a congregation of the Diocese of the Mid-Atlantic in the Anglican Church in North America.
- Truro Cathedral (formally the Cathedral of the Blessed Virgin Mary) in Truro, Cornwall, United Kingdom, the cathedral of the Diocese of Truro in the Church of England.
