= Band of Sisters =

Band of Sisters may refer to:

- Band of Sisters (film), a 2012 documentary by Mary Fishman
- Band of Sisters (book), a 2007 book by Kirsten Holmstedt
- Band of Sisters (TV series), a 2017 South Korean TV series

== See also ==
- Band of Brothers (disambiguation)
