= Falls Church (disambiguation) =

Falls Church is a city in the U.S. state of Virginia.

Fall Church may also refer to:

- West Falls Church, Virginia, a census-designated place
- The Falls Church, the historic Episcopal church for which Falls Church is named
- The Falls Church (Anglican), an Anglican parish which broke off from the Episcopal Church in 2006
- East Falls Church station, a station in the Washington Metro system
- West Falls Church station, a station in the Washington Metro system
- Falls Church High School, a high school in West Falls Church
