= St. John's Episcopal Church (Fort Washington, Maryland) =

Historic church in Maryland, US

- St. John's Church
- U.S. National Register of Historic Places
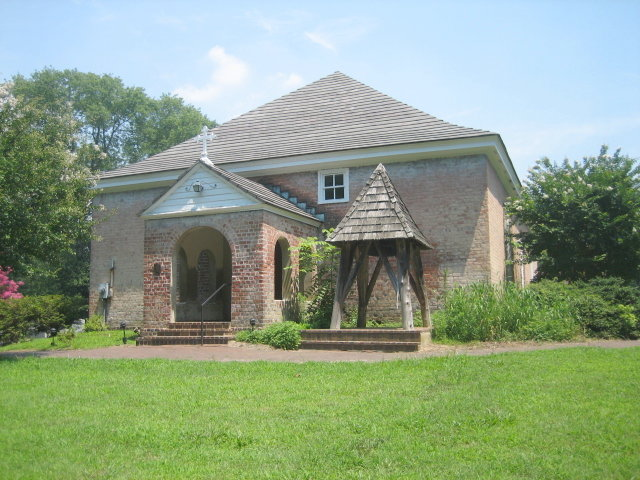
- St John's Church, Fort Washington, MD

- Location within Maryland Location within the United States
- Location: 9801 Livingston Rd., Fort Washington, Maryland
- Coordinates: 38°45′18″N 77°0′4″W
- Area: 3 acres (1.2 ha)
- Built: 1767
- Architectural style: Gothic Revival
- NRHP reference No.: 74002202
- Added to NRHP: April 8, 1974

St. John's Church, St. John's Episcopal Church, or St. John's Episcopal Church, Broad Creek (formerly King George's Parish), is a historic Episcopal church located at 9801 Livingston Road in Fort Washington, Prince George's County, Maryland. It is a rectangular Flemish bond brick structure with a bell hipped roof. The interior features a barrel vaulted ceiling with an intricate support system.

== Parish history ==
This is the oldest church site in Prince George's County, and one of the "Original 30 Parishes". The General Assembly by the Act of June 2, 1692 in the colonial Province of Maryland established King George's Parish (also known as the "Parish of Piscataway") of the Church of England. The Parish name reflects the local Piscataway tribe. The local freeholders at Broad Creek then chose a "select" vestry and completed parish organization on January 20, 1693, authorizing Col. John Addison to purchase 78 acres of ground and obtain a contractor to build a church. The Parish at that time included a considerable portion of the future Episcopal Diocese of Washington, including all of the District of Columbia. It endured until 1726, when "Prince George's Parish" was established. Piscataway then became known as St. John's, although officially its title was "King George's Parish". Its first church at Broad Creek, begun in May 1695 of wood, and which was soon called the "Broad Creek Church". This original church was replaced in 1713 by a second wooden structure, and was in turn replaced by a third structure in 1723, which was enlarged between 1764 and 1768. The present brick building, is the fourth structure built on the same site, was completed in 1767–1768. The congregation still holds their weekly services in this building.

Meanwhile, two other churches or Chapels of Ease were soon built within the parish, to serve communities too far removed from Broad Creek for convenient attendance at worship. "Addison Chapel" at Seat Pleasant, now St. Matthews, Addison Parish, started in 1696 in a log house. A chapel at Accokeek, which was briefly known as St. John's Church and now Christ Church (Accokeek, Maryland), was erected in 1698.

The congregation is considered a "Mother Church" for Episcopal and Anglican parishes in suburban Prince George's County as well as Montgomery County, and Washington and the District of Columbia. In 1719, a Chapel of Ease to Piscataway was erected at "Eastern Branch Hundred", which ultimately evolved into St. Paul's Parish at Rock Creek near Rock Creek which flows south through the National Capital and Georgetown to the Chesapeake and Ohio Canal and ultimately the Potomac River. Rev. Henry T. Addison became Broad Creek's rector in 1743 and served until the Revolution in 1776. However, Frederick County, Maryland and a corresponding parish, part of which became Montgomery County, Maryland split off in 1748, and 1776 respectively. Therefore, his successors, Rev. (then Bishop) Thomas Claggett and Rev. Walter Addison oversaw growth of the new capital city within this parish. Bishop Claggett, who also served as the Parish's rector until 1809, in 1793 became the first bishop consecrated within the newly formed Protestant Episcopal Church in the United States of America (itself organized in 1789), at a ceremony held at Trinity Church in Manhattan, in the then-capital city, New York City. A few months later, Rev. Addison became the first priest (presbyter) ordained in America, by Bishop Claggett, whose assistant he became. Bishop Claggett also oversaw in 1793 the first confirmation of young people in the new Protestant Episcopal Church, a class of forty-four presented by the parish's third rector, the Rev. Joseph Messenger.

Beginning in 1794, one of the priests of St. John's parish held services and preached in Georgetown, as well as in the older chapels in Seat Pleasant and Accokeek. The Federal District services were initially held with a few Episcopalian families at the local Presbyterian Church then on 'M' Street through the hospitality of its minister, the Rev. Stephen B. Balch. "Georgetown Parish" was created in 1809. A second parish St. John's was organized in 1815 across from what was then called the President's House. In 1830, a mission was started in Oxon Hill known as St. Barnabas. In 1875, what is now Christ Chapel, Clinton was begun as a mission of St. John's. Thus, from the old "King George Parish" also came "Prince George Parish" which originally embraced all of what is now the city of Washington and Georgetown as well as suburban Montgomery County.

General of the Continental Army and the First President, George Washington attended services at the Broad Creek church or the Accokeek chapel across the Potomac River from Mount Vernon on numerous occasions, when inclement weather made the roads to Alexandria impassable and boat passage unsafe. He himself, was a vestryman at his home parish of Christ Church in Alexandria, Virginia.

== Structure ==
An unusual outdoor feature of St. John's is the "campanile", consisting of four uprights about forty feet high, with a canopy under which reposes a bell. Slave galleries were common in old colonial churches, but here is found a feature of unique interest - an opening about a foot square in the gallery which was designed to admit the collection bag on the end of a long pole to receive the offering of the colored people in the gallery. The porch was added in the 19th century.

One of the pews in the church bears a silver plate on the door which reads: "In memory of George Washington - - Restored by his Great-Great-Great Grandnephew, George W. Magruder, 1895".

The church is a member of the Episcopal Diocese of Washington, with its offices at the Episcopal Church House at Washington National Cathedral on Mount St Alban in Washington, D.C. and its Bishop of Washington D.C. Also, the Episcopal Church, U.S.A., with its Presiding Bishop and administrative offices in New York City and also the worldwide Anglican Communion, with its titular head being the Archbishop of Canterbury at Lambeth Palace in London, England.

== Gallery ==
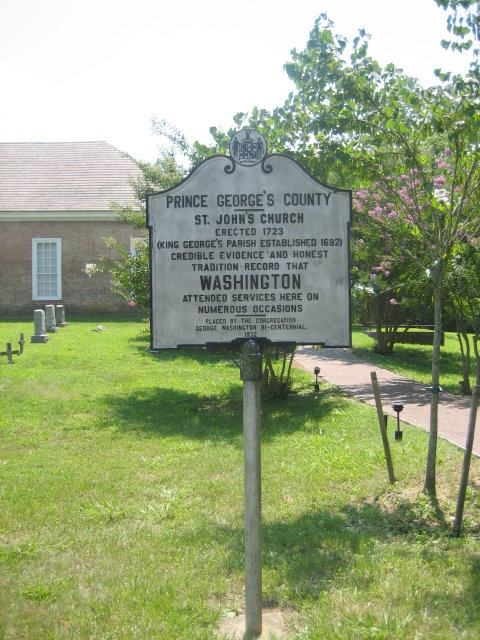
St. John's Episcopal Church - Broad Creek

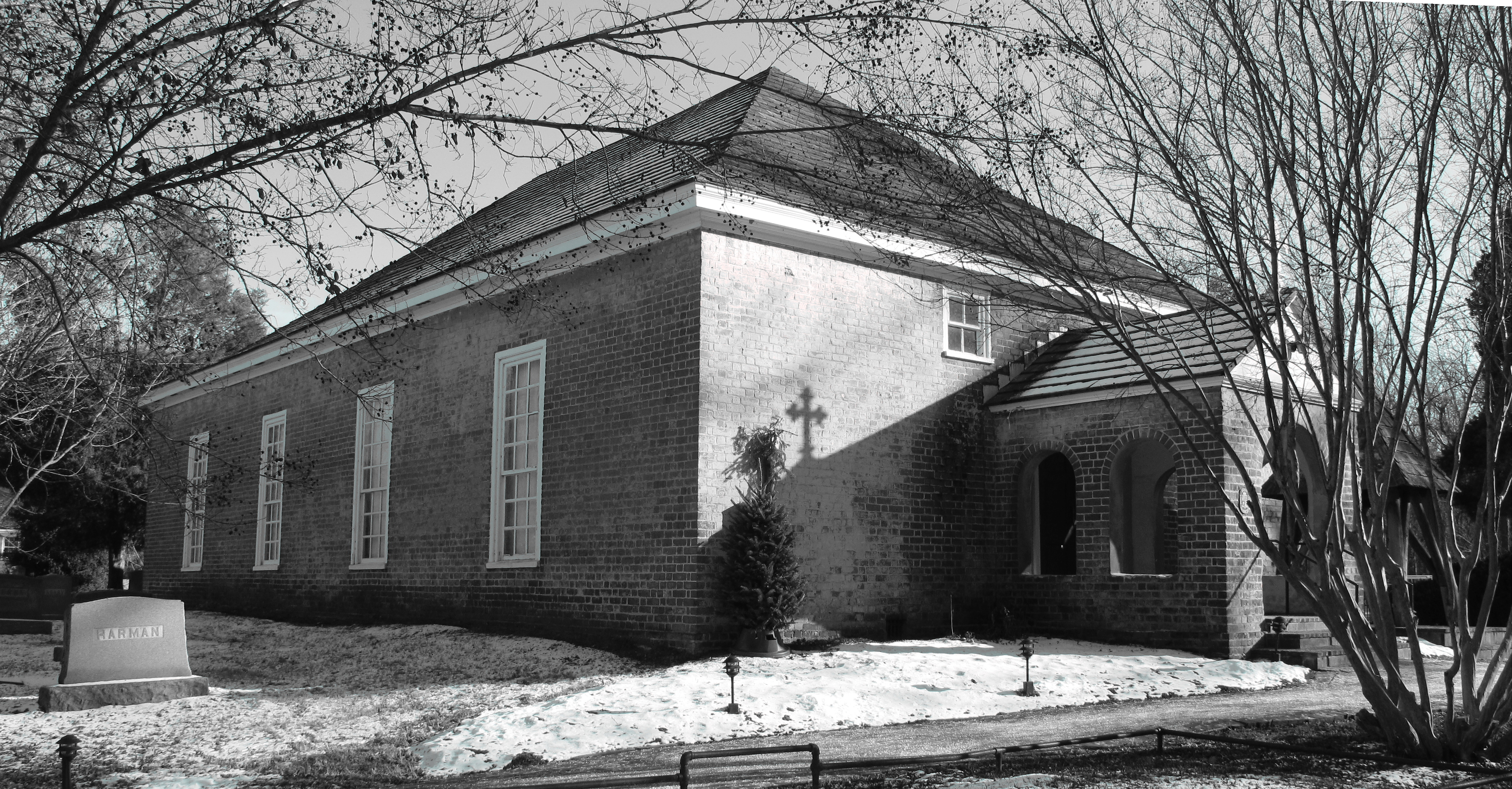

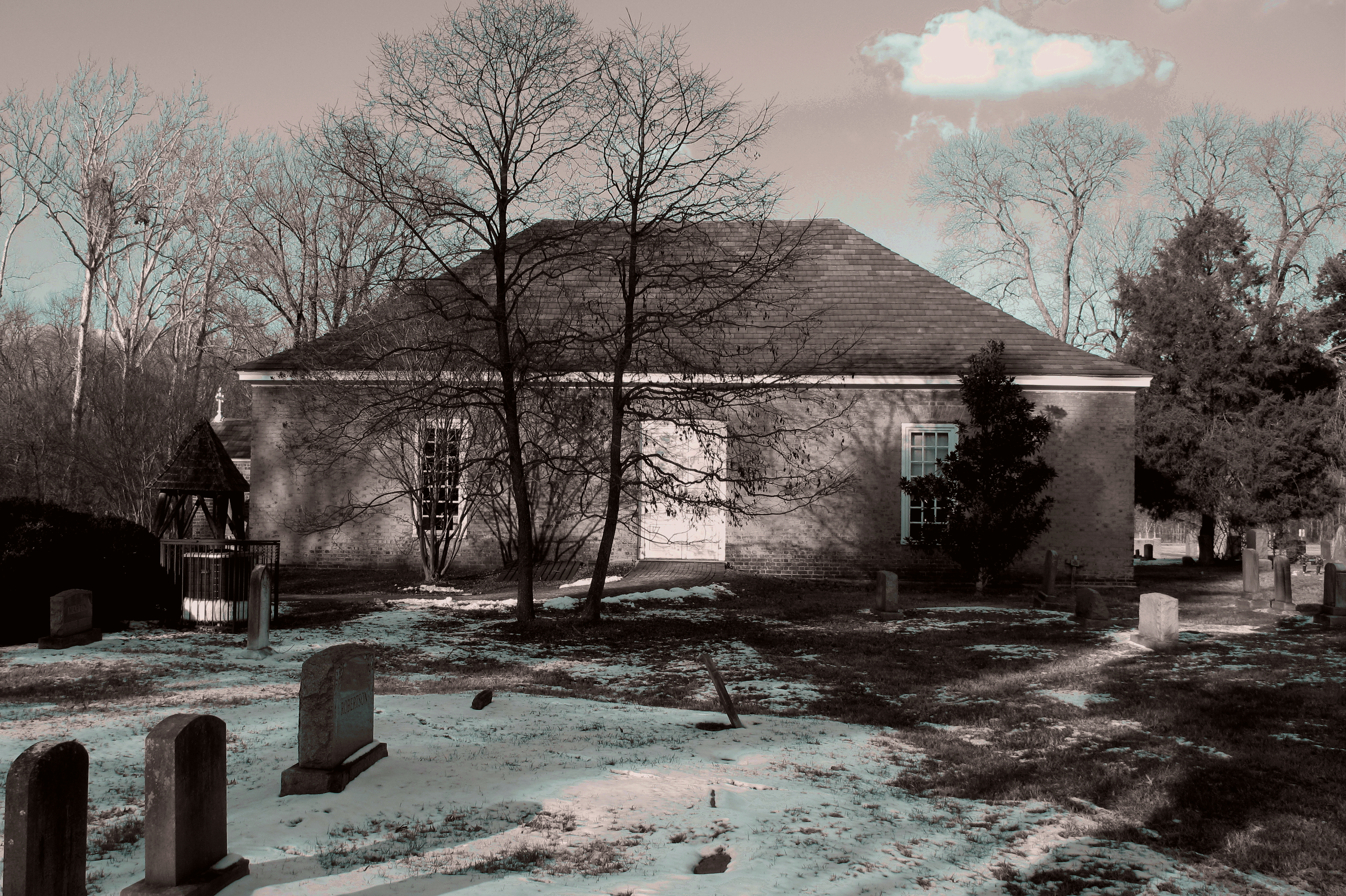

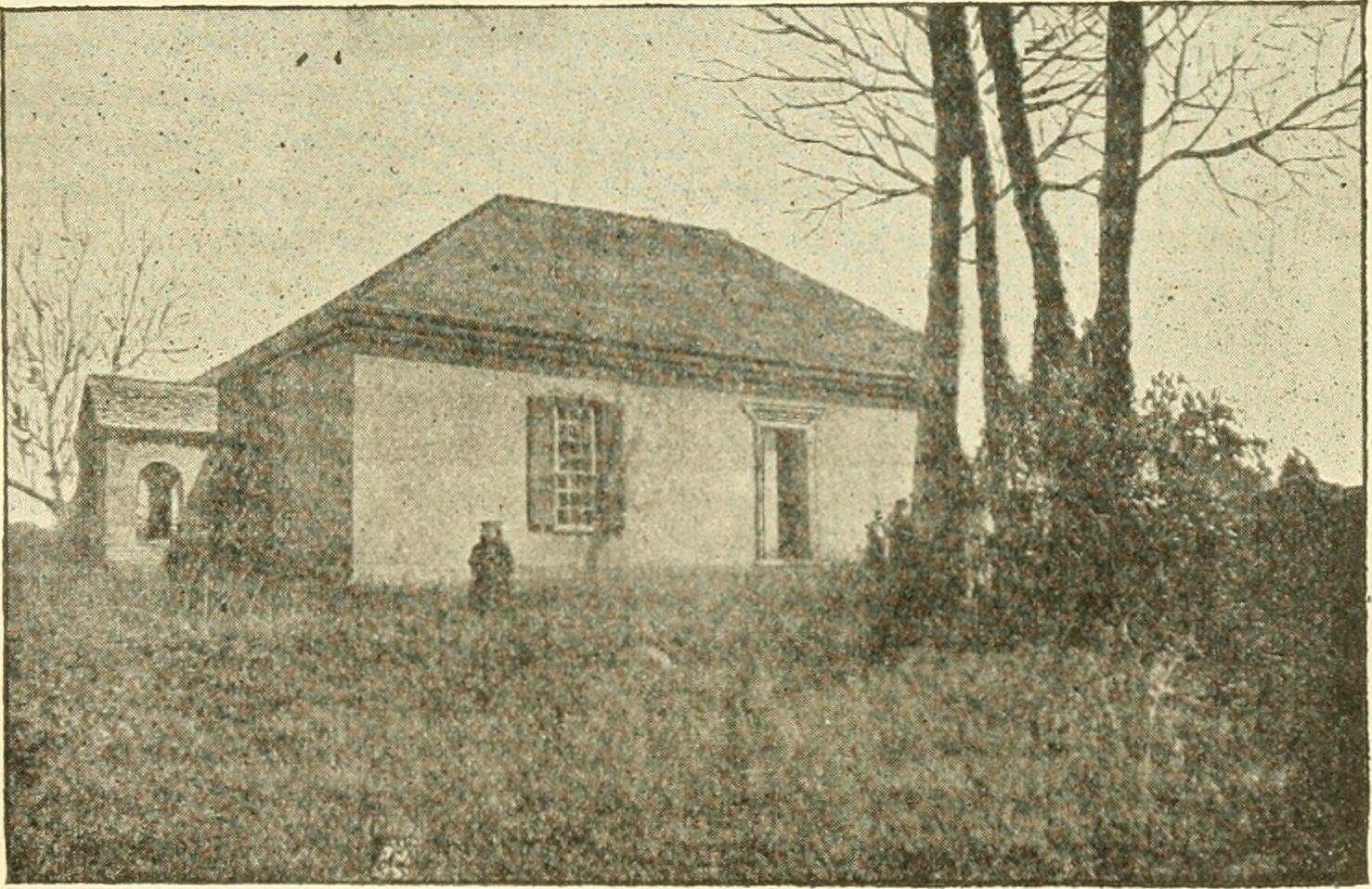

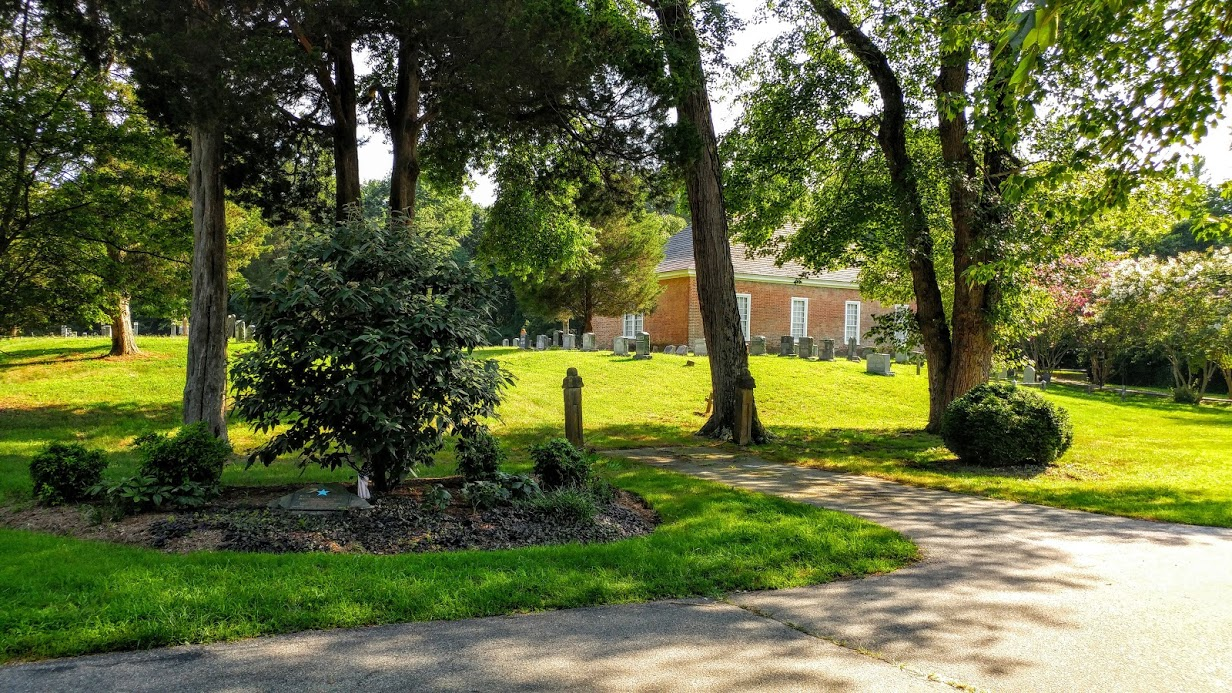
St John's Episcopal Church Blue Star Memorial, Chapel, and Cemetery

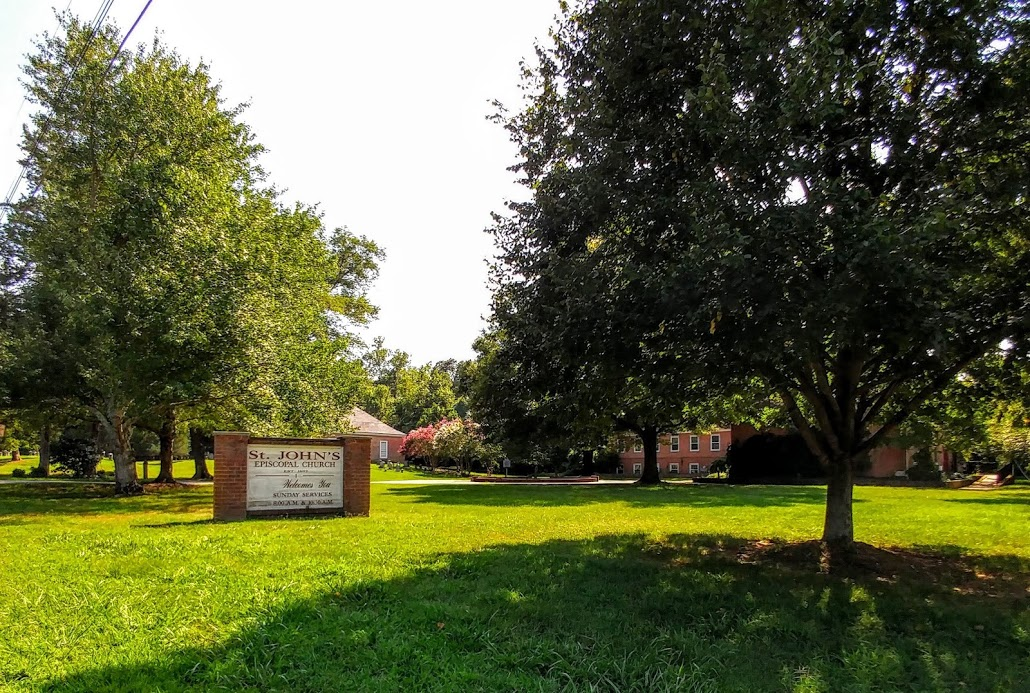
St John's Episcopal Church

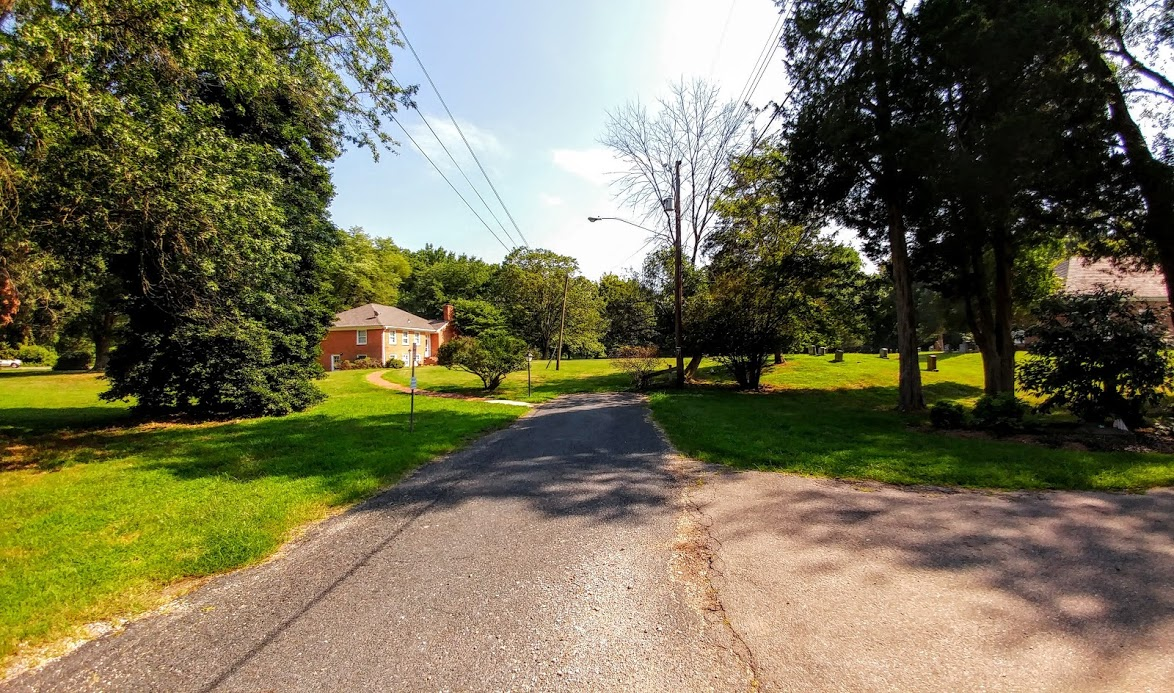
St John's Episcopal Church- Rectory on the left and Chapel to the right

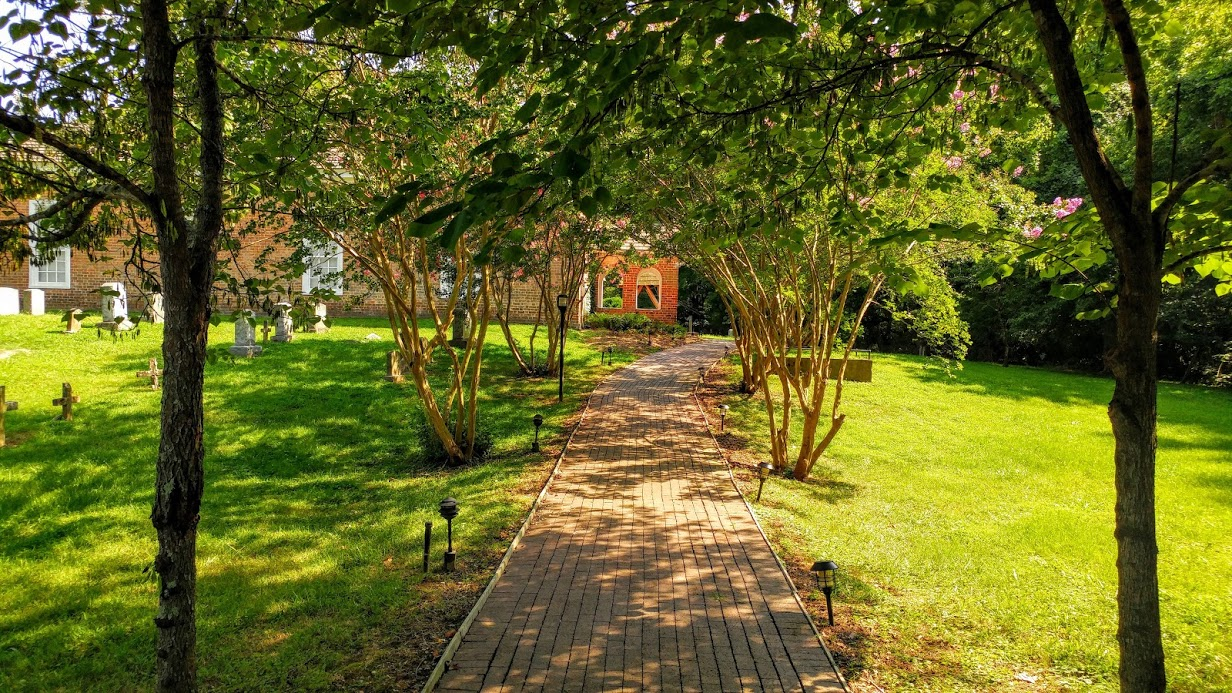
St John's Episcopal Church walkway to the Chapel

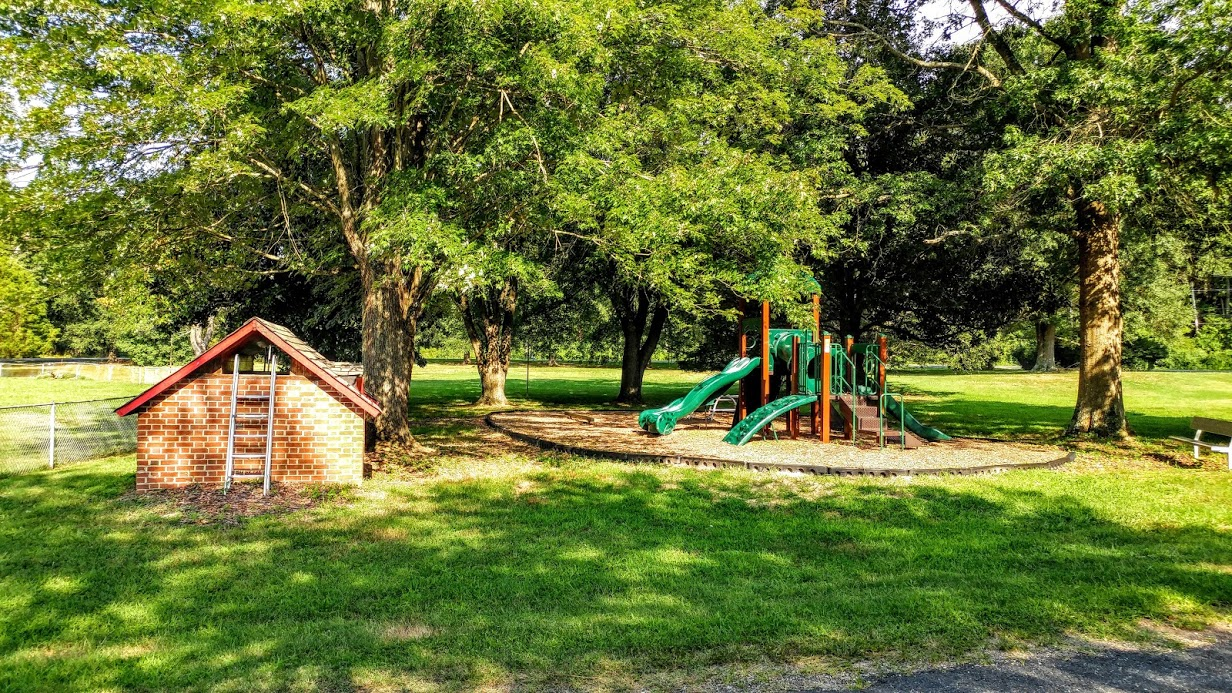
St John's Episcopal Church Youth Services Playground

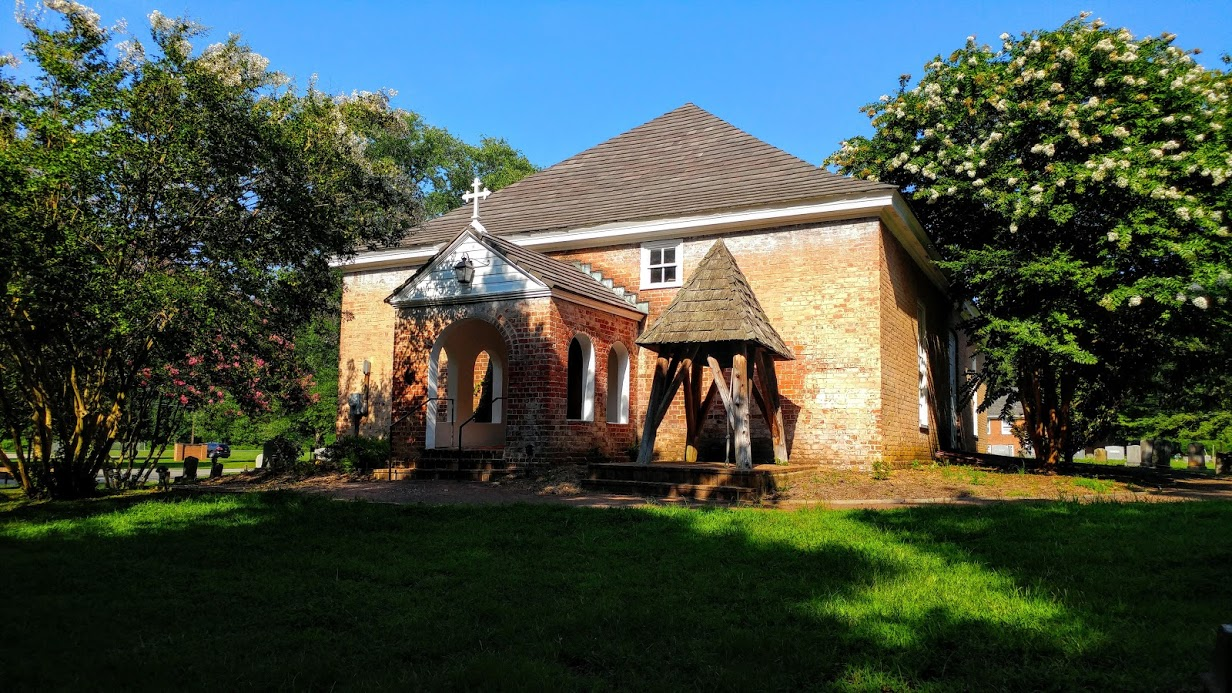
St John's Episcopal Church Chapel Erected in 1767. Weekly Services held here
