= Diocese of the Mid-Atlantic =

Anglican Church in North America diocese

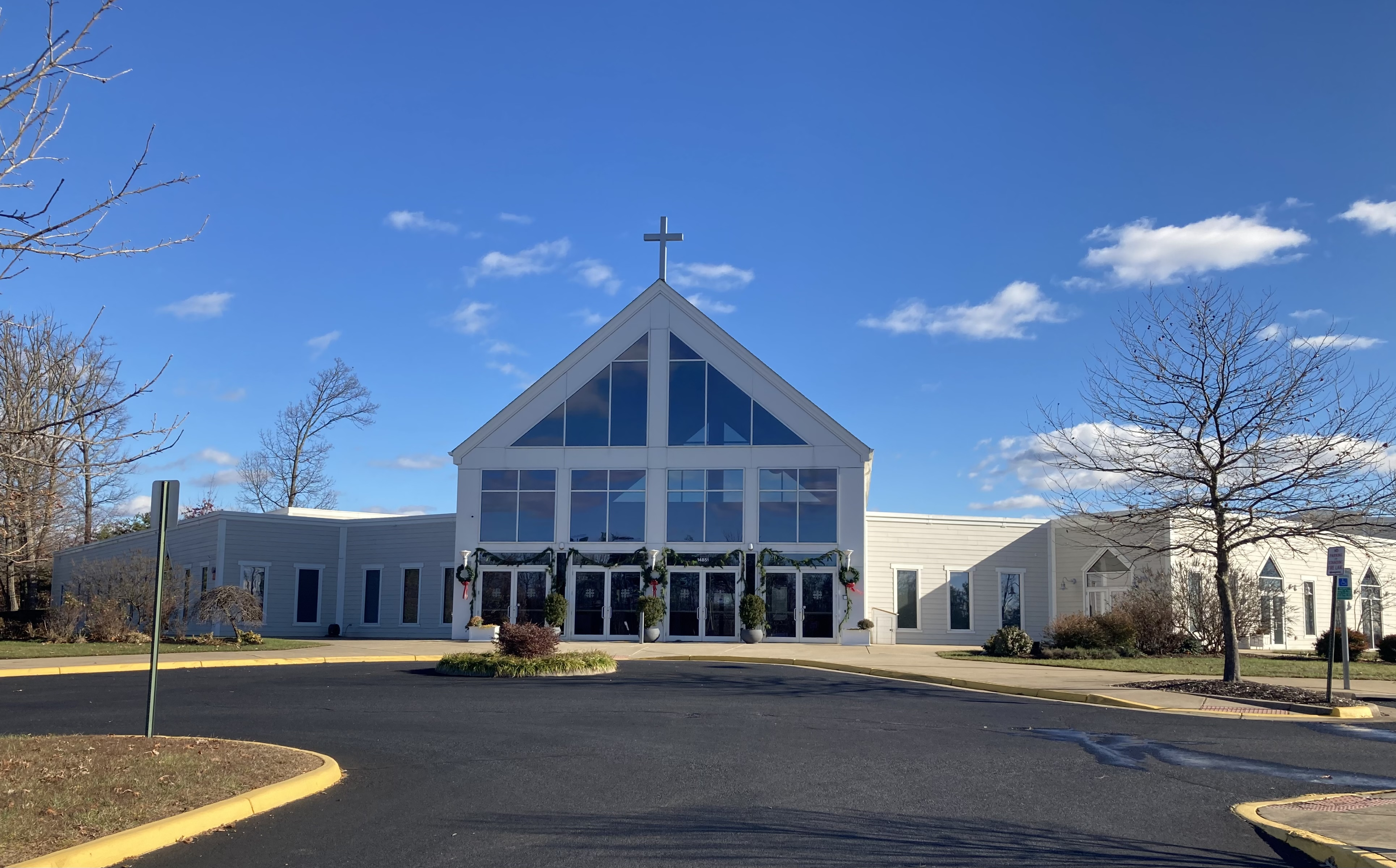
- The Diocese of the Mid-Atlantic headquarters is located at All Saints' Church in Dale City, Virginia.

Location
- Ecclesiastical province: Anglican Church in North America

Statistics
- Parishes: 41 (2025)
- Members: 8,941 (2025)

Information
- Rite: Anglican

Current leadership
- Bishop: Christopher Warner

Website
- anglicandoma.org

The Diocese of the Mid-Atlantic (DOMA) is an Anglican Church in North America diocese, encompassing Virginia, Maryland, Washington, D.C., and northeastern North Carolina, with 38 congregations, including several church plantings. The diocese was originally organized in 2006 as the Anglican District of Virginia when a group of conservative Virginian congregations withdrew from the Episcopal Church in opposition to the election of an openly gay bishop. It achieved diocesan status on June 21, 2011.

In 2025, DOMA became the focus of a Washington Post report revealing that the FBI was investigating a youth minister employed at one of its largest parishes after an independent inquiry concluded that the youth minister groomed and sexually abused children.

== History ==
=== Founding congregations ===
The Anglican District of Virginia was organized on December 17, 2006, by nine congregations that broke away from the Episcopal Diocese of Virginia. These congregations voted overwhelmingly to leave the Episcopal Church and formed the Anglican District of Virginia as part of the Convocation of Anglicans in North America (CANA), a ministry to Nigerian Anglicans living in North America that had also become an agent of Anglican realignment. The district was led by Martyn Minns, the Missionary Bishop of CANA.

The founding congregations were:

1. Church of the Epiphany, Herndon, Virginia
2. Truro Church, Fairfax
3. The Falls Church Anglican, Falls Church
4. Church of Our Saviour, Oatlands, Leesburg
5. St Margaret’s Church, Woodbridge, Virginia
6. Church of the Apostles, Fairfax, Virginia
7. Church of the Word, Gainesville, Virginia
8. St Stephens (Anglican), Heathsville, Virginia
9. Potomac Falls (Anglican), Potomac Falls, Virginia
10. Christ the Redeemer (Anglican), Centreville, Virginia

=== Growth ===
A tenth congregation that had broken from the Episcopal Diocese of Southern Virginia in October 2006, Church of the Messiah in Chesapeake, also later joined the district.

With the creation of the Anglican Church in North America in 2009, the Anglican District became a part of the new province while it continued to maintain its relationship with CANA. In May 2011, the district held a constitutional convention in Herndon, Virginia, where it voted to apply for formal diocesan status within ACNA and elected John Guernsey, USA Bishop of the Ugandan Diocese of North Kigezi and former rector of All Saints Church in Dale City, Virginia, as its first bishop. The Anglican Church's provincial council approved its admission as a diocese on June 21. Guernsey took office on September 10, 2011.

Church of the Word retained its property and rejoined DOMA in April 2016. In July 2021, Church of the Word changed its name to St. Thomas Anglican Church. In 2021, the historic Christ Church in Accokeek, Maryland, disaffiliated from the Episcopal Diocese of Washington and joined DOMA while retaining its property.

On October 15, 2022, Christopher Warner was selected as bishop-elect to succeed Guernsey. He was consecrated and invested in February 2023.

=== Misconduct allegations ===
In September 2023, Warner ordered an investigation into allegations of sexual misconduct against a youth minister who had been employed by The Falls Church Episcopal in the 1990s and early 2000s. The independent inquiry concluded that the youth minister “engaged in sexual abuse of students who participated in the youth program while he was employed.” At the conclusion of the investigation, Warner took the unusual step of publicly announcing that he had issued "Godly Admonitions" against the former and current rectors of The Falls Church Anglican, criticizing them for failing to investigate the allegations when first informed.

In October, Warner issued a statement responding to allegations reported on by The Washington Post that the archbishop of the ACNA, Steve Wood, had forcibly touched and attempted to kiss a female staff member in his office after paying her thousands of dollars in church funds. In the statement, Warner called it "disheartening" that the allegations had been shared with the Post and expressed confidence in the ACNA Provincial Office: "I’m confident that the ACNA is taking this seriously … and does not hesitate to take action when action is warranted."

In November, the Washington Post revealed that Warner had been one of four bishops initially approached about the allegations. According to the Post, Warner had declined to endorse or read the presentment against Wood when first approached in May. At the time, Warner had also been informed that the allegations contained a charge of sexual harassment involving a "potential unwanted advance" by Wood. Warner responded to one of the complainants by advising them to submit the complaint to a reporting channel managed by Wood's staff, because "there are women in that process." Warner also urged the complainants to wait a year before submitting their complaint to the ACNA.

On November 16, Warner sent an email to the clergy of DOMA, offering an apology to the women in his diocese and the women who had made allegations against Wood: "I recognize that women’s experiences are too often overlooked or minimized, particularly in systems led by men." He concluded the email by sharing that he had recently called for an inhibition of Wood.

== Bishops ==
1. John Guernsey (2011–2023)
2. Christopher Warner (since 2023)

== Parishes ==
In 2025, the Diocese of the Mid-Atlantic had 41 congregations, up 8% from 2022, with 8,941 members (up 12% from 2022) and an average Sunday attendance of 6,886 (up 35% from 2022). Notable parishes in the diocese include:

Church	Image	City	Year founded	Year completed	Notes
Christ Church		Accokeek, Maryland	1698	1747	
Truro Church		Fairfax, Virginia	1766	1959	
Church of the Epiphany		Chantilly, Virginia	1986	2018	
The Falls Church (Anglican)		West Falls Church, Virginia	2006	2019	Separated from The Falls Church (Episcopal). Largest church in the diocese (2022)
Restoration Anglican Church		Arlington, Virginia	2009	2014	Second-largest church in the diocese (2022)
Church of the Good Shepherd		Lynchburg, Virginia	2011	1886	Listed on the National Register of Historic Places
