= Oatlands Historic House & Gardens =

Historic estate in Leesburg, Virginia, US

- Oatlands Historic District
- U.S. National Register of Historic Places
- U.S. National Historic Landmark
- Virginia Landmarks Register
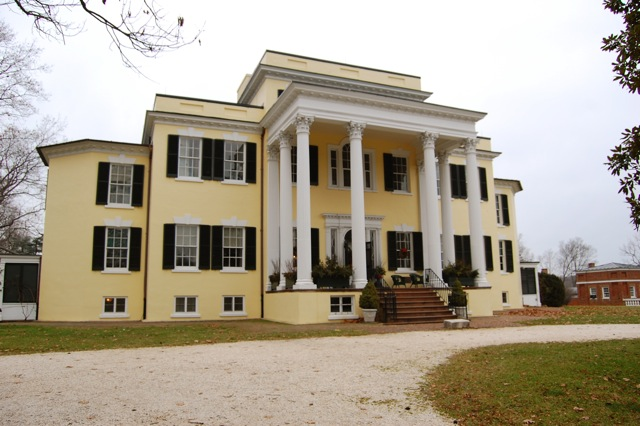
- The Oatlands Mansion

- Location within Northern Virginia Location within Virginia Location within the United States
- Interactive map of Oatlands Historic District
- Location: Loudoun County, Virginia
- Nearest city: Leesburg, Virginia
- Coordinates: 39°2′27″N 77°37′02″W
- Area: 415 acres (168 ha) (landmarked area)
- Built: c. 1804
- Architect: George Carter (original)
- Architectural style: Federal, Greek Revival
- Website: www.oatlands.org
- NRHP reference No.: 69000255 (original); 74002327 (expansion to district)
- VLR No.: 053-0093

Significant dates
- Added to NRHP: November 12, 1969 (original); May 3, 1974 (expansion to district)
- Designated NHL: November 11, 1971
- Designated VLR: September 9, 1969

Oatlands Historic House and Gardens (formerly Oatlands Plantation) is an estate located in Leesburg, Virginia, in the United States. Oatlands is operated by the National Trust for Historic Preservation and is listed on the National Register of Historic Places as a National Historic Landmark. The Oatlands property is composed of the main mansion and 415 acres (168.0 ha) of farmland and gardens. The house is judged one of the finest Federal-period country estate houses in the nation.

In addition to the Mansion, there are a number of outbuildings, including the Carriage House, Bachelor's Cottage, several barns, and farm buildings on the property. The grounds also include a greenhouse, built in 1810, that is said to be the oldest standing greenhouse in the South.

== History ==
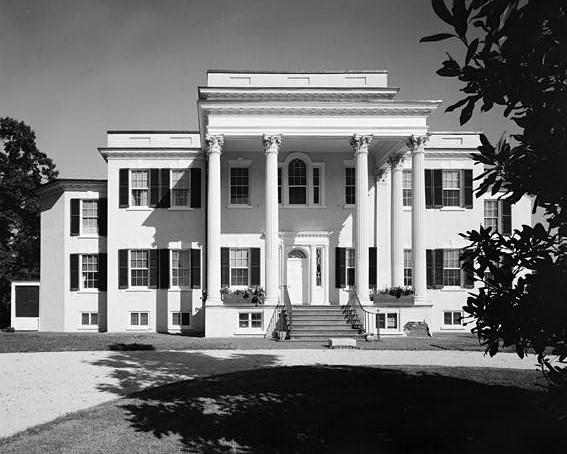
Main House of Oatlands Historic District (1973)

Garden at Oatlands.

Oatlands was established in 1798 by George Carter, a great-grandson of Robert "King" Carter, on 3,408 acres (1,980 ha) of farmland. It started as a wheat farm, but expanded to include other grains, sheep, a gristmill and a saw mill, as well as a vineyard. In 1804, Carter began construction of a Federal-style mansion, which he expanded in the 1820s and 1830s. A terraced garden and numerous outbuildings were added during this time.

Carter's plantation and business ventures were built with, and by, enslaved laborers. When Carter took ownership of the land and the people who worked there, there were 17 enslaved laborers on the land. Through both purchase of more enslaved people, and the system of chattel slavery (their children were also enslaved), the Carter Plantation claimed 133 people as property at the time of the 1860 United States census. Their work included planting and harvesting the fields; caring for farm animals; domestic labor, including cooking, cleaning, caring for children, and sewing; and probably trades, such as blacksmithing and milling.

George Carter's widow, Elizabeth Grayson Lewis Carter, inherited the property after her husband's death in 1846. In 1861, fearing that a battle between Union and Confederate forces was imminent nearby, Elizabeth Carter fled to another of her properties, Bellefield, which was near Upperville, Virginia. The Carters' eldest son, George Carter II, reopened the mansion with his wife, Katherine Powell Carter, in 1863 and inherited the property when his mother died in 1887.

In 1897, the Carter family sold the mansion with 60 acres (24.3 ha) for $10,000 (~$323,402 in 2024) to Stilson Hutchins, founder of The Washington Post newspaper, who never lived on the property.

Hutchins sold Oatlands in 1903 to William Corcoran Eustis and Edith Livingston Morton Eustis. Mrs. Eustis restored the gardens, which had been neglected and added boxwood-lined parterres to the terraces, as well as a statuary, a rose garden, a bowling green, and a reflecting pool. Today, her plantings include mature specimens of Buxus sempervirens `Arborescens’ and `Suffruticosa’, Larix decidua, and Quercus robur. The house was also upgraded and outfitted modern amenities, such as indoor plumbing, heating, and gas lighting. They also added pine floors, which were placed over the original Carter flooring, an elevator, and a custom first-floor bathroom for a childhood friend, Franklin D. Roosevelt.

Due to their prominent political stance in Washington, D.C., the Eustises had many famous friends, including General George C. Marshall, Henry Cabot Lodge, President Harry S. Truman and Franklin and Eleanor Roosevelt.

After Mrs. Eustis' death in 1964, her daughters, Margaret and Anne, donated the mansion, furnishings, and estate grounds to Margaret's husband, David E. Finley, founder of the National Trust for Historic Preservation.

It was declared a National Historic Landmark in 1971. In 1974, a series of scenic easements around the National Historic Landmark area were designated the Oatlands Historic District on the National Register of Historic Places. The district includes Oatland Mills, the Mountain Gap School, and the Church of Our Savior.

== See also ==
- List of botanical gardens in the United States
- List of National Historic Landmarks in Virginia
- National Register of Historic Places listings in Loudoun County, Virginia
