= Christopher Warner (bishop) =

American Anglican bishop

The Right Reverend Christopher Warner
- Bishop of the Mid-Atlantic
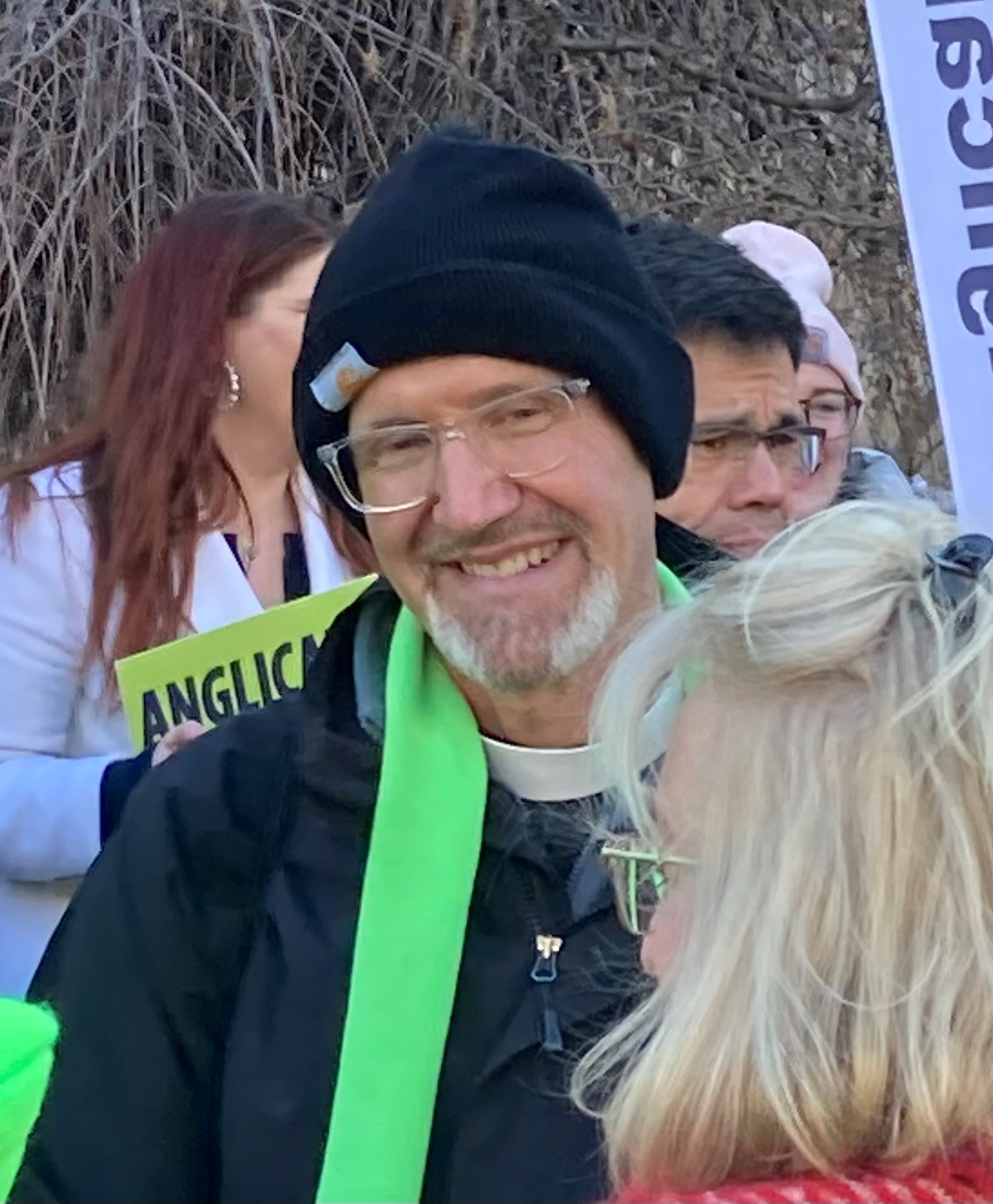
- Warner as bishop-elect of the Diocese of the Mid-Atlantic at the 2023 March for Life in Washington, D.C.
- Church: Anglican Church in North America
- Diocese: Mid-Atlantic
- In office: 2023–present
- Predecessor: John Guernsey

Orders
- Ordination: 2000 (diaconate); 2001 (priesthood)
- Consecration: February 18, 2023 by Foley Beach

Personal details
- Born: 1969 (age 56–57) Pueblo, Colorado

Christopher S. Warner (born 1969) is an American bishop in the Anglican Church in North America. (ACNA) He is the second bishop of the Diocese of the Mid-Atlantic (DOMA). He was previously a priest in the Anglican Diocese of South Carolina.

In November 2025, The Washington Post reported that Warner was one of four bishops in the Anglican Church in North America who had declined to endorse an ecclesiastical presentment against Archbishop Steve Wood after being approached about allegations that Wood engaged in sexual harassment, bullying of church staff, and plagiarism.

== Early life, education, and family ==
Warner was born in 1969 in Pueblo, Colorado. He was baptized in the Catholic Church but did not grow up attending church. In high school and college, Warner became a Deadhead and followed the Grateful Dead on East Coast tours. He has said that he became fearful of demonic presences at Grateful Dead concerts. During a Dead concert at RFK Stadium in Washington, D.C., Warner left the stadium and prayed for conversion.

Warner graduated from the University of North Carolina at Wilmington in 1991. After college, he began discernment for ordained ministry and served as a youth pastor at St. Margaret's Episcopal Church in Charlotte. In 1993, he married his wife, Catherine, and they have three adult children. In 1997, after working in the financial sector at the Bank of America and Broadway and Seymour, Warner enrolled in Trinity School for Ministry.

== Ordained ministry ==
The bishop of the Episcopal Diocese of Pittsburgh, Robert Duncan, ordained Warner to the diaconate in 2000 upon his graduation from Trinity. He was ordained to the priesthood the following year. He served from 2000 to 2002 as curate at Trinity Episcopal Church in Columbus, Georgia. From 2002 to 2007, he was associate rector at the Church of the Holy Cross in Sullivan's Island, South Carolina, where he developed a men's hiking ministry that has expanded throughout the Diocese of South Carolina and assisted with the launch of a second campus in Daniel Island.

In 2007, Warner was appointed rector of St. Christopher Camp and Conference Center on Seabrook Island. The camp is a 300-acre retreat center then owned by the Episcopal Diocese of South Carolina. The role included spiritual oversight of the camp and conference center programs (including summer camps, a barrier island environmental education program and diocesan and church conferences) plus oversight of 60 employees. He chose to leave St. Christopher's in 2011. With the rift between the Diocese of South Carolina and the Episcopal Church portending future litigation over diocesan properties, Warner has said that "[n]ecessarily, St. Christopher would be stewarded through management rather than visionary growth. After much prayer, I realized my gift mix was better suited elsewhere." (In 2022, St. Christopher's was returned to the Episcopal Diocese of South Carolina under a final settlement.)

Warner returned to Holy Cross as an associate priest and in 2015 was appointed rector of the multisite congregation with a ministry staff of 22 plus two preschool programs at its two campuses. During his ministry there, Holy Cross paid down $1.5 million in building debt from prior expansions. He also shifted Holy Cross from a "seeker-sensitive" model to a "relational and discipleship model" for church life.

In the late 2010s, Warner has said, he was encouraged to consider episcopal ministry by the Anglican Network in Canada's suffragan bishop Trevor Walters and Bishop Mark Lawrence. He was a finalist in the election for the 15th bishop of South Carolina in which Chip Edgar was elected. In October 2022, Warner was elected the second bishop of the Diocese of the Mid-Atlantic to succeed John Guernsey. Following consent from the ACNA College of Bishops, Warner was consecrated as a bishop by Foley Beach and 25 other ACNA bishops on February 18, 2023, at the Falls Church Anglican. During the service, he was invested as the diocese's second bishop.

== Bishop of the Diocese of the Mid-Atlantic ==
In September 2023, Warner ordered an investigation into allegations of sexual misconduct against a youth minister who had been employed by The Falls Church Episcopal in the 1990s and early 2000s. The independent inquiry concluded that the youth minister "engaged in sexual abuse of students who participated in the youth program while he was employed". At the conclusion of the investigation in April 2024, Warner ordered a pastoral letter be read aloud in every congregation in DOMA, in which he shared the report's conclusion regarding The Falls Church's role in responding to the allegations:

The report finds that when a credible allegation of sexual abuse was received in 2007, the church did not do enough to determine whether others were harmed. Finally, the report finds that in 2021, when these allegations were raised again, the church failed to take the necessary steps to investigate what happened in the church's past.

In November 2024, Warner took the unusual step of publicly announcing that he had issued "godly admonitions" against the former and current rectors of The Falls Church Anglican, criticizing them for failing to investigate the allegations when first informed. In a pastoral letter, Warner shared why he had decided to issue an admonition against the current rector of The Falls Church Anglican, the Rev. Sam Ferguson, noting Ferguson's expression of public remorse for not actively responding to the allegations:

Unfortunately, when the crisis surfaced during his tenure in 2021, Reverend Ferguson did not actively respond to it through investigation or by seeking Bishop Guernsey's counsel. This resulted in extra years of pain for the reporting family and others. To Reverend Ferguson's credit, during the Listening Sessions he publicly acknowledged his shortcomings in this matter, citing his inexperience as a new Rector in 2021 and acknowledging his desire in that role to be "successful," which overshadowed the imperative for action.

In June 2025, Warner stated that he had recently joined the archbishop of the ACNA, Steve Wood, for a trip to Kenya, during which they together led a three-day retreat for the Anglican Church of Kenya's house of bishops. Warner said about the trip that "It was a powerful time with God's presence among us in word, worship and sacrament and as we prayed for each other and anointed one another with oil."

In October, The Washington Post reported that an ecclesiastical presentment had been issued against Wood, who was being accused of forcibly touching and attempting to kiss a female staff member in his office, of improperly paying her thousands of dollars in church funds, of bullying and disparaging colleagues, and of plagiarism. The misconduct was alleged to have occurred at St. Andrew's Church in Mount Pleasant, South Carolina, where Wood was the longtime rector. On October 23, Warner responded with a statement calling it "disheartening" that the allegations had been shared with the Post and expressing confidence in the ACNA provincial office: "I'm confident that the ACNA is taking this seriously ... and does not hesitate to take action when action is warranted."

However, in November 2025, the Washington Post revealed that Warner had been one of four bishops initially approached about the allegations. Warner acknowledged that the complainants had shared the draft presentment against Wood with him in May, months before speaking to the Post. Warner had also been informed that the allegations contained a charge of sexual harassment involving a "potential unwanted advance" by Wood. At the time, he had declined to endorse or read the presentment, instead referring them to a reporting channel managed by Wood's staff because, in Warner's words, "there are women in that process". Warner also encouraged them to wait a year or more until a new disciplinary process was set to be adopted.

On November 16, Warner sent an email to the clergy of DOMA offering an apology to the women in his diocese and the women who had made allegations against Wood: "I recognize that women's experiences are too often overlooked or minimized, particularly in systems led by men." He concluded the email by stating that he had recently called for an inhibition of Wood.

Anglican Communion titles
Preceded by John Guernsey	II Bishop of the Mid-Atlantic; 2023–present	Succeeded by Incumbent
