= Church of the Epiphany (Chantilly, Virginia) =

Coordinates: 38°53′52″N 77°25′46″W

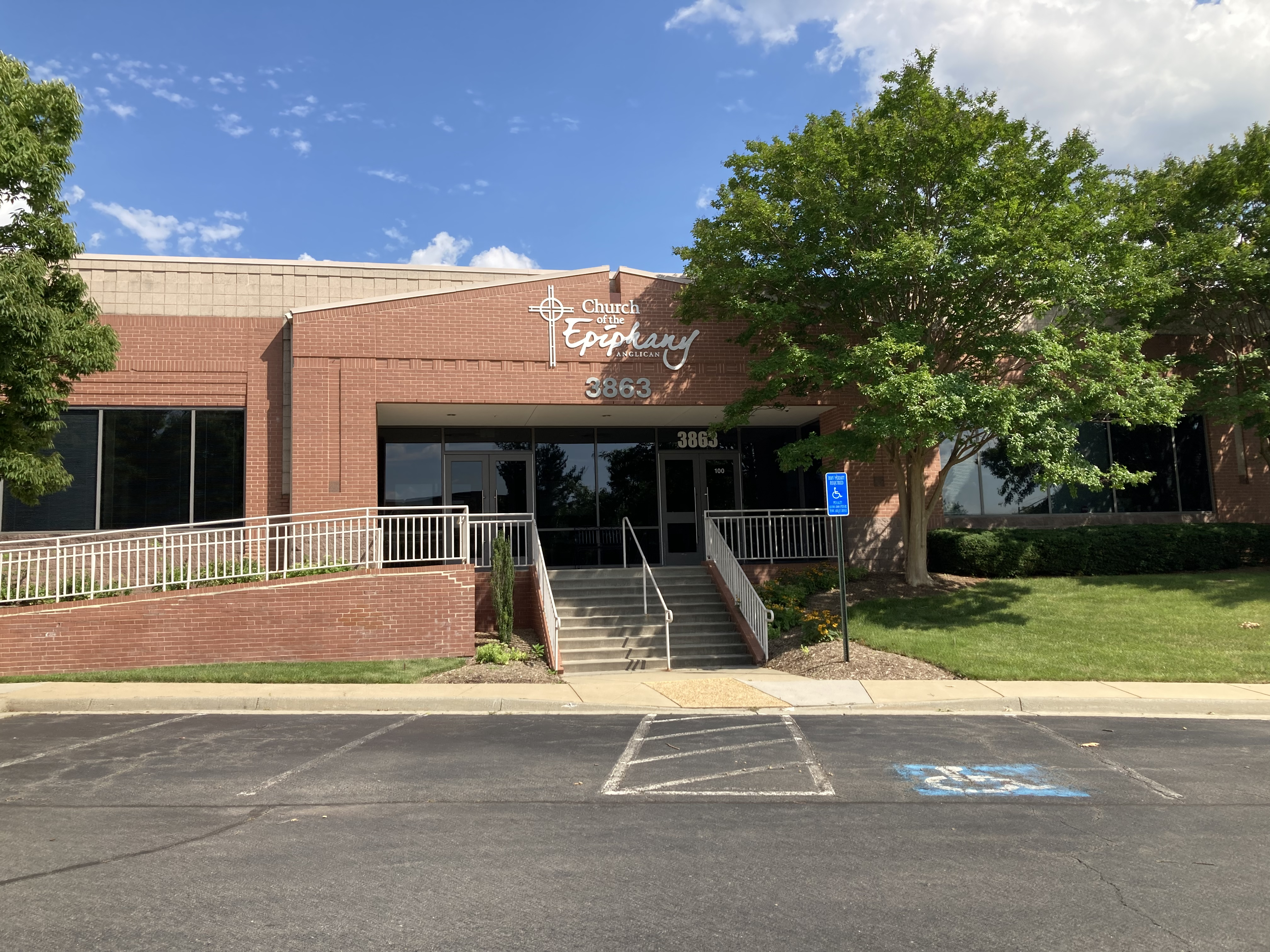
- Church of the Epiphany
- Location: 3863 Centerview Drive, Chantilly, Virginia 20151
- Country: United States
- Denomination: Episcopal Church (1985–2006); Anglican Church in North America (2008–present)
- Website: epiphanyanglican.net

History
- Founded: 1986
- Dedicated: 2018

Administration
- Diocese: Diocese of the Mid-Atlantic

Clergy
- Rector: The Rev. Peter Frank
- Priest: The Rev. Pamela Meeks

The Church of the Epiphany is an Anglican church located in Chantilly, Virginia. It emphasizes "Encountering God through beautiful worship and believing prayer, building a multigenerational congregation that loves children and families and equipping every member to share the good news of Jesus Christ." Notable ministries and activities include a yearly free "Sports Camp" in Herndon for elementary-age students, bi-weekly worship and other ministry activities at the Arbor Terrace memory care home in Chantilly, and monthly donations of food that go home with students in need at Coates Elementary School in Herndon. Each year, Epiphany designates the congregation's Christmas Eve offering to a special project, alternating between supporting mission outside of the United States and meeting local needs in Fairfax County.

Church services on Sunday at are 8:00 and 10:15 am. Average Sunday attendance at Epiphany was 155 in 2018.

Church of the Epiphany is part of the Diocese of the Mid-Atlantic of the Anglican Church in North America. Its current rector is the Rev. Peter Frank. Epiphany's current associate rector is the Rev. Pamela Meeks.

== History ==
The original church was established in 1985 when Truro Church in Fairfax planned to establish a mission church in Western Fairfax County. Groundbreaking for the church's first building on the corner of Franklin Farm Rd. and Fairfax County Parkway, took place in March 1988, and three years later the parish was established.

The congregation voted, with the majority choosing to break from the Episcopal Church in 2006 and affiliate with the Anglican Province of Nigeria and Convocation of Anglicans in North America (CANA). As the Anglican Church in North America (ACNA) was formed, and the Diocese of the Mid-Atlantic came into being in 2011, Epiphany became part of the new local diocese. In 2012, The Episcopal Church prevailed in its legal efforts to claim the Franklin Farm building. Epiphany Anglican temporary relocated to 13515 Dulles Technology Drive between 2012 and 2017. As of March 2018 completed the build-out of its new facility, and has moved into its long term home at 3863 Centerview Drive in Chantilly.
