= Phoebe Jeter =

United States Army soldier

Phoebe Jeter (born 1964 in Chester, South Carolina) is a United States Army retired Major noted for being the only woman and first male or female air defense artillery officer to lead a platoon that destroyed a SCUD missile fired against U.S. military forces during Operation Desert Storm.

Jeter attended the University of North Carolina Wilmington where she was commissioned a 2nd lieutenant. She led a coed platoon of soldiers during Desert Storm while assigned to D Battery, 3-43 (Patriot) ADA.
