= John Guernsey =

American bishop

The Right Reverend John A. M. Guernsey
- Bishop of the Mid-Atlantic
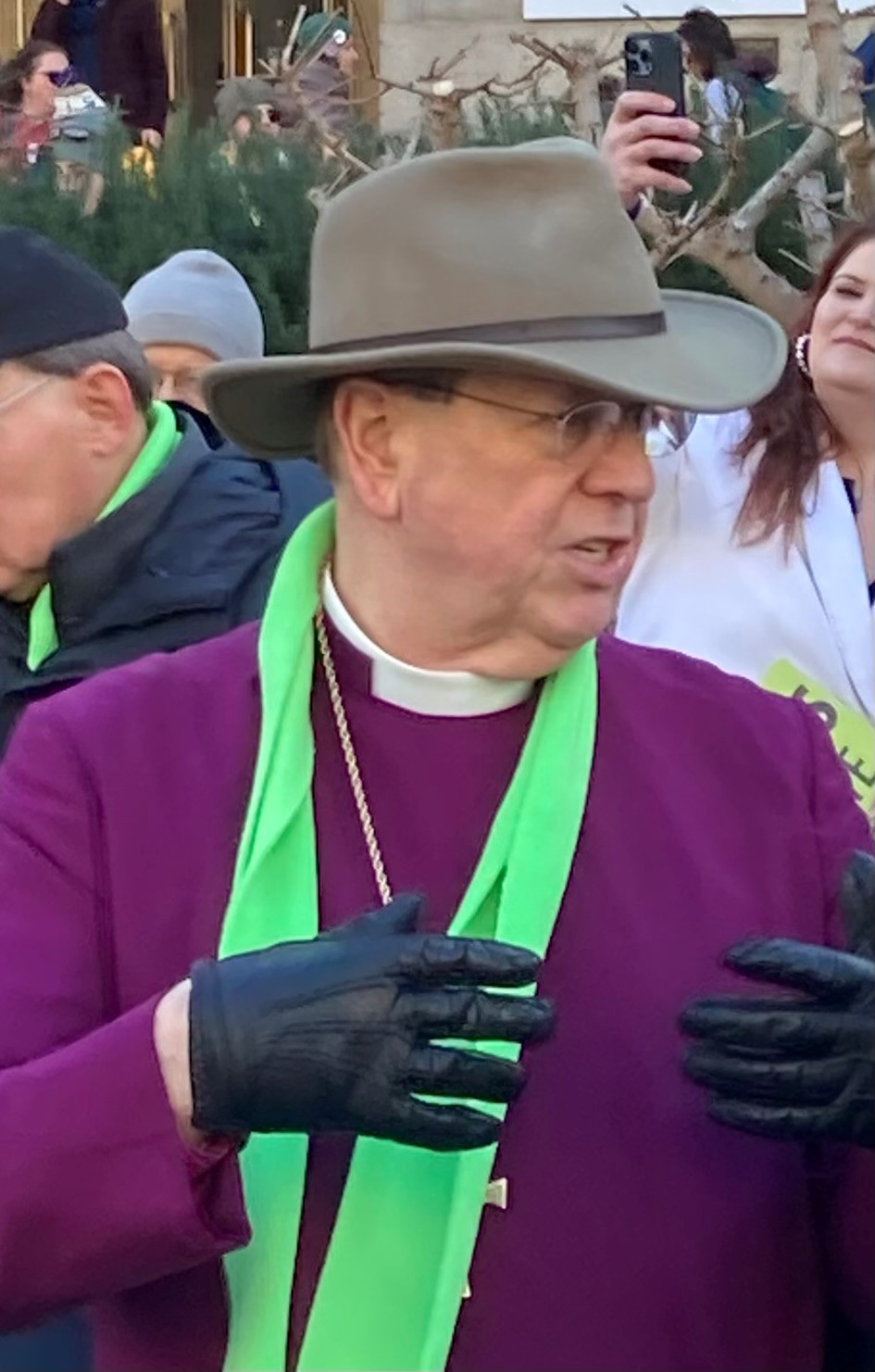
- Guernsey at the 2023 March for Life in Washington, D.C.
- Church: Anglican Church in North America
- Diocese: Diocese of the Mid-Atlantic
- In office: 2011–2023
- Predecessor: See created
- Successor: Christopher Warner
- Other posts: Bishop for Congregations in America, Church of Uganda; Bishop of the Diocese of the Holy Spirit (transitional)

Orders
- Consecration: 2007 by Henry Luke Orombi

Personal details
- Born: 1953 (age 71–72)

John A. M. Guernsey (born 1953) is a retired American bishop in the Anglican Church in North America (ACNA). Previously an Episcopal priest, he was consecrated as a bishop of the Church of Uganda in September 2007 as part of the Anglican realignment, and transferred to the newly formed ACNA in 2009. From 2011 to 2023, Guernsey was the first bishop of ACNA's Diocese of the Mid-Atlantic.

== Education and early career ==
Guernsey was born in St. Louis, Missouri. He received a B.A. from Yale University and an M.Div. from the Episcopal Divinity School. During seminary, he met his wife, Meg Phillips, whom he married in 1979. He and his wife were both ordained to the priesthood in the Episcopal Church. From 1978 to 1981, Guernsey was associate rector of Christ Church in Alexandria, Virginia. In 1981, he was called as rector of All Saints Church in Dale City, Virginia, which he led for 29 years.

Guernsey was nominated, along with Martyn Minns and Robert Duncan, to serve as Bishop of Colorado in 1990. He was not elected, and decided after that to focus on his parish ministry. In 1989, Guernsey went on the first of several mission trips to Uganda. In the aftermath of the consecration of V. Gene Robinson in 2003, Guernsey's parish left the Episcopal Church and became affiliated with the Anglican Church of Uganda. The choice of Uganda was in part because the Anglican church there ordains women to the priesthood, unlike some other African Anglican provinces. As part of its departure, All Saints surrendered its property to the Episcopal Diocese of Virginia and built a new facility in nearby Woodbridge, Virginia.

== Episcopacy ==
In December 2006, the bishops of the Church of Uganda elected Guernsey to serve the 33 Ugandan-affiliated Anglican parishes in the United States. He was notified of the election in June 2007 and consecrated in Mbarara on September 2, 2007, by Ugandan Archbishop Henry Luke Orombi.

In 2009, the Church of Uganda transferred all its North American congregations to the newly formed Anglican Church in North America as the transitional Diocese of the Holy Spirit. By 2011, these congregations had been dismissed to in-formation regional dioceses, and Guernsey was elected to the serve as the first bishop of the newly created Diocese of the Mid-Atlantic. He was invested by Archbishop Robert Duncan on September 10, 2011.

In September 2021, Guernsey announced his intention to retire in the coming years. The Diocese of the Mid-Atlantic launched an episcopal search and election process scheduled to be completed by early 2023 with the consecration of Guernsey's successor, after which point Guernsey would retire. On October 15, 2022, Christopher Warner was selected as bishop to succeed Guernsey. Guernsey's retirement took effect in February 2023, when Warner was consecrated and invested to succeed him.

== Personal life ==
Guernsey lives in Woodbridge, Virginia with his wife, the Rev. Meg Phillips Guernsey. They have two adult children, one of whom, Michael, is an Anglican priest and former dean of Holy Cross Cathedral in Loganville, Georgia.

Anglican Communion titles
Preceded by See created	I Bishop of the Mid-Atlantic; 2011–2023	Succeeded by Christopher Warner
