= Band of Sisters (book) =

2007 non-fiction book about the Iraq War

Band of Sisters: American Women at War in Iraq
- Author: Kirsten Holmstedt
- Language: English
- Subject: Iraq War, Women
- Genre: Nonfiction, Military History
- Publisher: Stackpole Books
- Publication date: July 2007
- Publication place: United States
- Pages: 384
- ISBN: 978-0-8117-0267-6

Band of Sisters: American Women at War in Iraq is a 2007 book by Kirsten Holmstedt about the Iraq War and women in the military with a foreword by Tammy Duckworth. Band of Sisters presents twelve stories of American women on the frontlines including America's first female pilot to be shot down and survive, the U.S. military's first black female combat pilot, a 21-year-old turret gunner defending a convoy, two military policewomen in a firefight, and a nurse struggling to save lives.

Holmstedt claims that women need greater protection from hazing and abuse by fellow soldiers, but that they are as strong as men and should be given full combat roles.

== Author ==
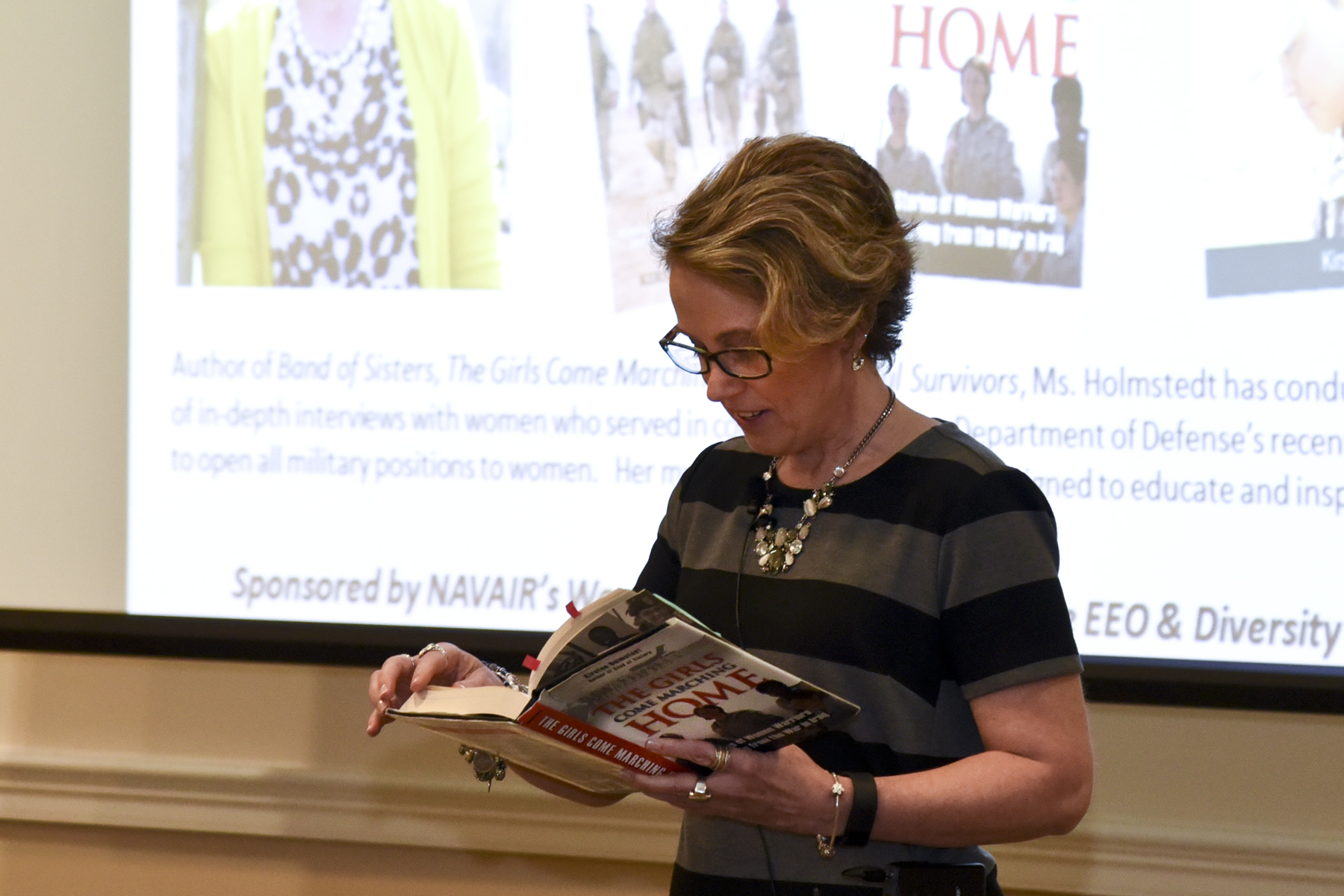
Kirsten Holmstedt reads from The Girls Come Marching Home, at a NAVAIR Women's History Month event in 2016

Kirsten Holmstedt is a journalist who writes about the military. She has published two other books:

- The Girls Come Marching Home: Stories of Women Warriors Returning from the War in Iraq (2009) Stackpole. ISBN 0-811-70846-2 OCLC 313018241
- Soul Survivors: Stories of Wounded Women Warriors and the Battles They Fight Long After They've Left the War Zone (2016) Stackpole. ISBN 0811713792 OCLC 905524529

== Awards and recognition ==
- Winner of the 2007 American Authors Association Quill Award
- Winner of the 2007 Military Writers Society of America Founders Award

== See also ==
- Vernice Armour, featured in Band of Sisters, was the first African-American female naval aviator in the Marine Corps and America's first African American female combat pilot in the United States military
- Tammy Duckworth, wrote the foreword for Band of Sisters. She is a former U.S. Army helicopter pilot whose severe combat wounds cost her both of her legs and damaged her right arm, former director of the Illinois Department of Veterans Affairs, and current United States senator for Illinois
