= The Falls Church Anglican =

Coordinates: 38°52′11″N 77°10′16″W

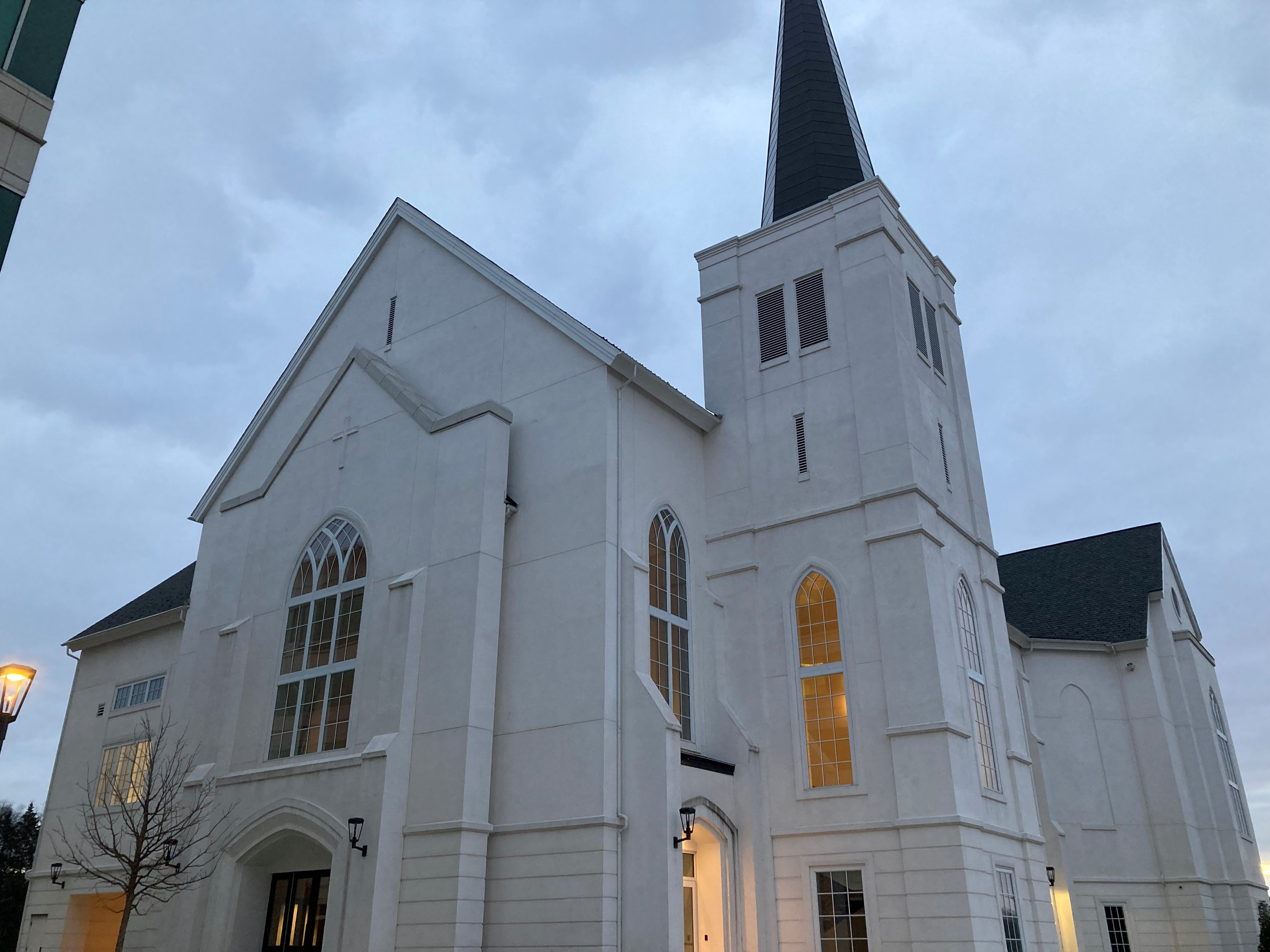
- The Falls Church Anglican
- Location: West Falls Church, Virginia
- Country: United States
- Denomination: Anglican Church in North America
- Website: tfcanglican.org

History
- Dedicated: 2019

Architecture
- Architect: LS3P

Administration
- Diocese: Mid-Atlantic

Clergy
- Rector: Samuel D. Ferguson

The Falls Church Anglican is an Anglican parish church in the United States in the Falls Church section of Fairfax County, Virginia, near Washington, D.C. In 2006, the congregation of the Falls Church divided over the question of whether to leave the Episcopal Church, effectively creating two congregations: the Falls Church Anglican and the Falls Church.

Following years of conflict within the Episcopal Church over issues surrounding Biblical authority and interpretation (including issues such as human sexuality, the role of men and women in ordained ministry, and liturgical reform) a number of congregations within the Episcopal Church concluded that the only way for them to remain faithful to their views was to "walk apart" from the Episcopal Church, yet remain in communion with other Anglican churches. The Falls Church was one of these congregations. In December 2006, a substantial majority of the congregation of the Falls Church voted to disaffiliate from the Episcopal Church in the United States of America and join the Convocation of Anglicans in North America, a missionary effort headed by Martyn Minns, former rector of Truro Church, and sponsored by the Church of Nigeria, a member of Anglican Church in North America. In 2013, the Falls Church Anglican affiliated directly with the Anglican Church in North America.

== History ==
=== Colonial beginnings ===
The forerunner to the Falls Church appears to have been founded by landowner William Gunnell, who had moved from Westmoreland County, Virginia, in 1729. In the spring of 1730, he secured a cleric and convened a congregation, which met in his home until 1733, when the first building was constructed. Until that time, this area was served by a cleric who lived near present-day Quantico, and the nearest church was Pohick Church near Lorton.

Known as "William Gunnell's Church", the new wooden structure was designed and built by Colonel Richard Blackburn, who was directed to construct a weatherboarded building forty feet by twenty-two feet, with a 13:12 pitch roof, and with interior work modeled on that of Pohick Church; the cost was 33,500 pounds of tobacco. Like Pohick Church, the new church served Truro Parish, which had been established by the colonial Virginia Assembly in May 1732 for the land north of the Occoquan River; Truro's first vestry met in November 1732. Michael Reagan allowed the church to be built on his land, but failed to grant the deed. John Trammell later bought the land and, in 1746, sold the two acre lot, including the church, the churchyard, and a spring, to the vestry of Truro Parish. By this point, it was known as the Upper Church.

The Vestry Book first referred to it as the "Falls Church" on 28 November 1757, owing to its location at the intersection of the road to the Little Falls of the Potomac River (upstream of the Chain Bridge) and the Middle Turnpike (leading from Alexandria to Leesburg, now Virginia Route 7 or Leesburg Pike, called West Broad Street in downtown Falls Church City).

George Mason was elected vestryman in 1748, as was George Washington in 1762.

=== New brick church ===
By 1762, the wood building had fallen into decay and the vestry ordered a new brick building to be constructed on the same site. The next year, George Washington and George William Fairfax, as church wardens, assumed responsibility to contract for the new building. After 1765, this church became the seat of the new Fairfax Parish.

The new church was designed by Colonel James Wren, a member of the vestry. Work commenced in 1767 and completed in late fall 1769. The Wren building remains on the site, between S. Washington, E. Broad, and E. Fairfax Streets. The 1769 structure is the oldest remaining church building north of Quantico in Virginia and is one of the oldest church structures in the United States.

=== Revolutionary War and aftermath ===
The Fairfax militia recruited from the church during the Revolutionary War, and it is said that at the war's end, the Declaration of Independence was read to citizens from the steps of the south doors. In 1784, the Commonwealth of Virginia revoked the status of the Anglican Church as state church. In 1789, the Falls Church was abandoned and remained unoccupied for almost 50 years; in 1836, it was reoccupied by an Episcopal congregation. Francis Scott Key was a lay reader of this congregation, as was Henry Fairfax, who used his own funds to restore the building during 1838 and 1839.

=== Civil War disruption and damage ===
During the American Civil War the church was used by Union troops as a hospital and later as a stable. Use of the building for worship services resumed after the war; the sanctuary has now been in continuous use since about 1873. The interior was repaired after the war, with the Federal government paying for damage caused by Union forces. Some of these repairs can be discerned in brickwork below the windows and in the lower part of the brick doorway at the west end of the church.

The church was remodeled in 1908 and extensively renovated in 1959. Galleries in Wren's original design but never constructed were installed, and a new chancel was added. Other than repairs of war damage and the chancel addition, the structure reflects the original 1769 construction.

=== Separation from the Episcopal Church ===
The decision by the Falls Church Anglican to break away from the Episcopal Church stemmed from increasing dissatisfaction within the majority of the congregation over the direction being taken by the Episcopal Church. Several episodes contributed to the widening split, including the consecration of Gene Robinson, a partnered gay man, as Bishop of New Hampshire. In the view of many congregants, the Episcopal Church by these actions had violated its own constitution. These congregants concluded that to stay true to their traditional beliefs, they must separate. A vote was taken and 90 percent of the parishioners decided to leave the Episcopal Church to join the breakaway Convocation of Anglicans in North America, and 96 percent voted to hold on the property currently used. A minority faction, however, voted to remain part of the Episcopal Church. The majority group renamed itself the Falls Church Anglican, while the minority faction kept the name The Falls Church. However, both congregations claim 1732 as their founding date, and the same history through to 2006.

Following a lengthy court dispute around the property, ended in 2012, a minority faction that voted to remain part of the Episcopal Church was awarded ownership of the church property, and the Anglican congregation parish of 3000 people had to move to nearby rented locations.

In 2013, the Falls Church Anglican affiliated directly with the Anglican Church in North America.

In June 2015 the Falls Church Anglican purchased land near the original church, with the intention of building a new church in the next years. The purchase will cost the parishioners $54 million ($31 million for the acquisition and an additional $23 million for new construction). On September 8, 2019, Falls Church Anglican celebrated its first worship service in their new facility.

Since the 2006 split from the Episcopal Church, the Falls Church Anglican has been able to expand, by being able to fund and staff three more independent "daughter" Anglican churches: Christ Church in Vienna, Restoration Anglican, Arlington in Alexandria, and Grace Anglican in Winchester.
