= Gales Ferry Cemetery =

Historic cemetery in Connecticut

Coordinates: 41.428429°N 72.084732°W

The Historic Gales Ferry Cemetery is located at 12-24 Hurlbutt Road, Gales Ferry, Connecticut, United States. It is bordered by Military Highway, Hurlbutt Road, Winthrop Road and the Gales Ferry Library Park. It is administered by The Gales Ferry Cemetery Association (GFCA); contact address PO Box 144, Gales Ferry, CT 06335. The cemetery is listed on the National Register of Historic Places, as a contributing property to the Gales Ferry Historic District #2.

== History ==
=== Early history ===
The earliest gravestones in the cemetery are "Ann" buried November 15, 1772 and Luther Geer died 1776. According to History of the Town of Ledyard: The Geer family had originally settled in New London in 1651 and flourished in the area. The land that is currently the Gales Ferry Cemetery was probably the Luther Geer farm at one time (this can not be confirmed as land records from this period are unavailable). It was eventually purchased by the United Methodist Church of Gales Ferry. The church was established in 1803 and the graves were incorporated into the church burial grounds. In 1815 the congregation moved to a new building (now 6 Hurlbutt Road), on the other side of Military Highway, but burials continued at the original site.

=== Gales Ferry Cemetery Association ===
"In 1834, eighteen enterprising and public minded citizens bought a half acre of land for thirty dollars from the Rev. Ralph Hurlbutt for the purpose of establishing a Burying Ground. This land was "a few rods westerly of the Methodist Meeting House...and enclosed with a stone wall being eight rods adjoining the road and ten rods deep. Each gentleman had one share except for Ralph Hurlbutt and Adam Larrabee who each had two shares. Ralph had the privilege of 'reserving to himself the grass and herbage ... to be fed or taken off in such manner as will not injure the monuments.'

Apparently, the Burying Ground existed in a neighborly and informal way, each lot owner acting independently without regard to formal plans, straight aisles, or driveways. It was managed by a kind of group action by the lot owners, for in 1884, at a legal meeting of the 'proprietors' calling themselves the Gales Ferry Cemetery Association with Charles A. Satterlee as Superintendent and Treasurer, it was voted to enlarge the cemetery by purchasing more land. Later, in that same year it was voted to advertise lots at ten dollars each for a limited time of three weeks after which the 'price shall be advanced.'

Recognizing that the poor will always be with us, these philanthropic citizens in laying out the new section voted that 'one lot in the new part be a free lot', (allowing for eight graves), which has come to be known as the public lot or the pauper's plot. This lot still exists as a grassy plot of unmarked graves. Without substantial and consecutive records, it is difficult to know if all graves have been used. History records the death of a man killed while robbing the Gales Ferry Railroad Station in 1900. He was buried in an unmarked grave in the west driveway, next to the public lot, implying that the pauper's lot was already full.

During 1886, a statement was circulated in the Gales Ferry area suggesting the organization of a formal Gales Ferry Cemetery Association, first, to see to 'all necessary work for the care and best good of the cemetery' secondly that a necessary income 'be carefully and judiciously expended" and thirdly that members of the Association agree 'to pay sums hereby subscribed.' In due course, the Association was incorporated on February 25, 1887, and the first official meeting was held in the vestry of the Methodist Church. Annual meetings were to be held on the second Saturday in May in the church vestry 'unless said day be stormy, in which case the meeting shall be held at the same hour and place the next fair Saturday following.' At one annual meeting of the Association there were no funds to keep the grass mowed so it was 'voted... to accept the proposal of a farmer to lease the cemetery to him for sheep grazing.'

Things seem to have moved smoothly for the Association from 1894 to 1911, because the annual minutes read 'no meeting, no quorum' until 1912 when a glowing testimonial to retiring officer Charles A. Satterlee was read showing appreciation for his '28 years of steady service.'

In 1912, the Association minutes report more land was acquired on the 'west side of the cemetery', and in 1913, the president was authorized to clear the land of rocks and the 'price of lots be advanced to $25.00 if free from stone.'

From 1919 on, there was continued discussion and effort to acquire more land for enlarging the cemetery but it was not until 1949 that the acquisition was made through the gift of adjoining acres by Mr. Tracy Smith. Price per grave was raised to thirty-five dollars, ten dollars of which was to go into the permanent fund for the care of the cemetery. In 1955, the Association 'voted that no lots be sold to anyone outside of the Town of Ledyard.'

The Gales Ferry Cemetery remains the largest cemetery in Ledyard in its original incorporated state.

In 2003 the Gales Ferry Cemetery was listed on the National Register of Historic Places.

"Over the years revenue collected from plot sales, burial fees and bequests was meticulously managed by the assoc. Board of Directors. Sadly, in 2007, it was discovered that these funds, carefully saved and invested for more than 100 years, were misappropriated by a sexton/treasurer." The matter was referred to Connecticut Attorney General Richard Blumenthal. It resulted in a criminal prosecution and conviction.

=== Reorganization ===
"In August, 2007 the Gales Ferry Cemetery Association was reorganized." Membership was open to: "plot owners, immediate family members and "those interested in furthering the purpose of this organization.... The officers are: President, Secretary, Sexton and Treasurer. The abbreviation GFCA was adopted."

The new board has placed an emphasis on; beautification, care, maintenance, and to expand community interest. Extensive fund raising efforts were made to rebuild the perpetual care fund. Additionally, the Board has taken prudent steps to insure fiscal responsibility.

== Notable interments ==
The Gales Ferry Cemetery is the burial site of many prominent Ledyard citizens, veterans from every American war, and their families. Included are:

- A monument to Charles Satterlee, (plot S16.7), USCG, whose ship the USCGC Tampa was torpedoed and sunk during World War I. His body was lost at sea. Two navy ships and a building at the nearby U. S. Coast Guard Academy have been named after him.
- Revolutionary War Veteran Nathan Lester (1742–1813) (S29.4). The Nathan Lester House built in 1793 still stands and is listed on the National Register of Historic Places. It is a public monument administered by the Ledyard Historic District Commission.
- Civil War Veteran Charles H. Comstock, 12th Regiment, Company K, Connecticut Volunteers, 1824 - 1929 (S24.5)
