= Applewood =

Applewood is the wood of an apple tree. It can add flavor to dishes, such as "Applewood smoked bacon". "Applewood" can also refer to any of the following:

== Places ==
- Applewood, Colorado, USA
- Applewood, Swords, Ireland
- Applewood Farm, Connecticut, USA
- Applewood Park, Calgary, Canada
- Applewood (Flint, Michigan), USA

== Other ==
- Applewood cheese
- Applewood Books
