= Perkins-Bill House =

Historic house in Connecticut, United States

- U.S. National Register of Historic Places
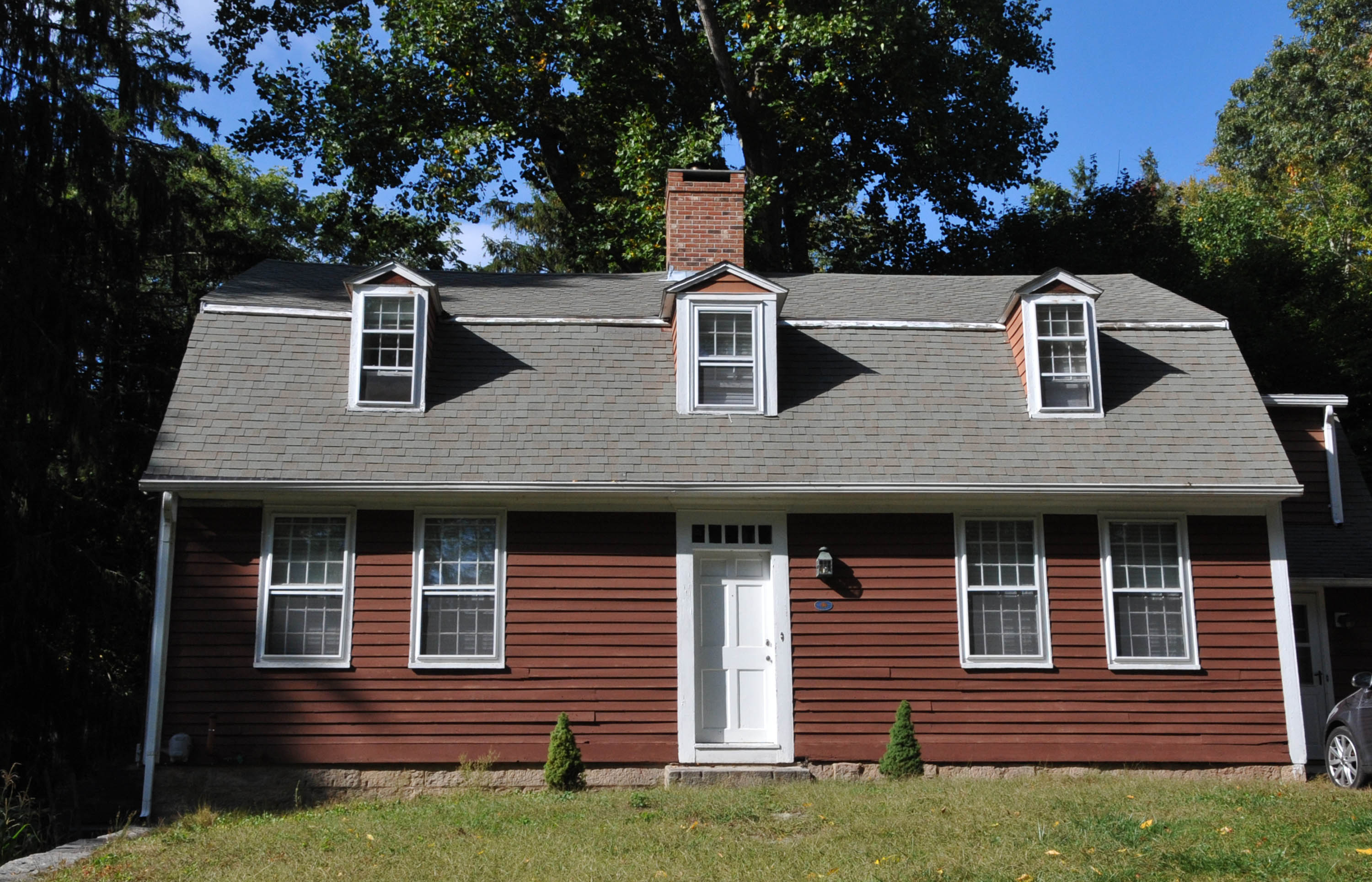

- Location within Connecticut Location within the United States
- Location: 1040 Long Cove Road, Gales Ferry, Connecticut
- Coordinates: 41°24′34″N 72°4′36″W
- Area: 3.6 acres (1.5 ha)
- Built: 1775
- Built by: Solomon Perkins, Sr.
- Architectural style: Colonial
- NRHP reference No.: 00000817
- Added to NRHP: July 20, 2000

The Perkins-Bill House is a historic house at 1040 Long Cove Road in the Gales Ferry section of Ledyard, Connecticut. Built circa 1775 by Solomon Perkins Sr., it is locally significant as a well-preserved gambrel-roofed Cape of the period, and for the role played by Perkins, his son Solomon Jr., and Benjamin Bill Jr., the house's next owner, in the American Revolutionary War. All three were defenders of the fort in Groton that was attacked by British forces under the overall command of Benedict Arnold in the 1781 Battle of Groton Heights. The house was listed on the National Register of Historic Places in 2000.

== Description and history ==
The Perkins-Bill House is located on the north side of a rural stretch of Long Cove Road, west of Connecticut Route 12. It is a 1 1/2-story gambrel-roofed Cape, five bays wide, with a central chimney and three gable-roofed dormers. A recessed ell extends from the northeast end of the main block. The house is oriented with its facade facing roughly southeast, perpendicular to the street, with the foundation of a barn between it and the street. The interior follows a typical central chimney plan, with a narrow entrance vestibule, parlors to either side of the chimney, and the kitchen behind. Interior finishes date from the house's construction to the early 19th century, including modest Federal and Greek Revival elements.

The house was built sometime between 1773 and 1777 by John Jones. The house was built using sawn lumber, and the nearby sawmill was only established in 1773, and the house was sold by Jones to Solomon Perkins Sr. and his son in 1777. The Perkinses operated the mill, but wounds the elder Perkins suffered in the Battle of Groton Heights may have limited his ability to operate it, and it was foreclosed in 1783. It was purchased after the foreclosure by Benjamin Bill, who was, like the Perkinses, part of the militia in the Revolutionary War battle. Subsequent owners, the Stoddards, held the property for many years.

== See also ==
- National Register of Historic Places listings in New London County, Connecticut
