= Gurdon Bill Store =

- U.S. National Register of Historic Places
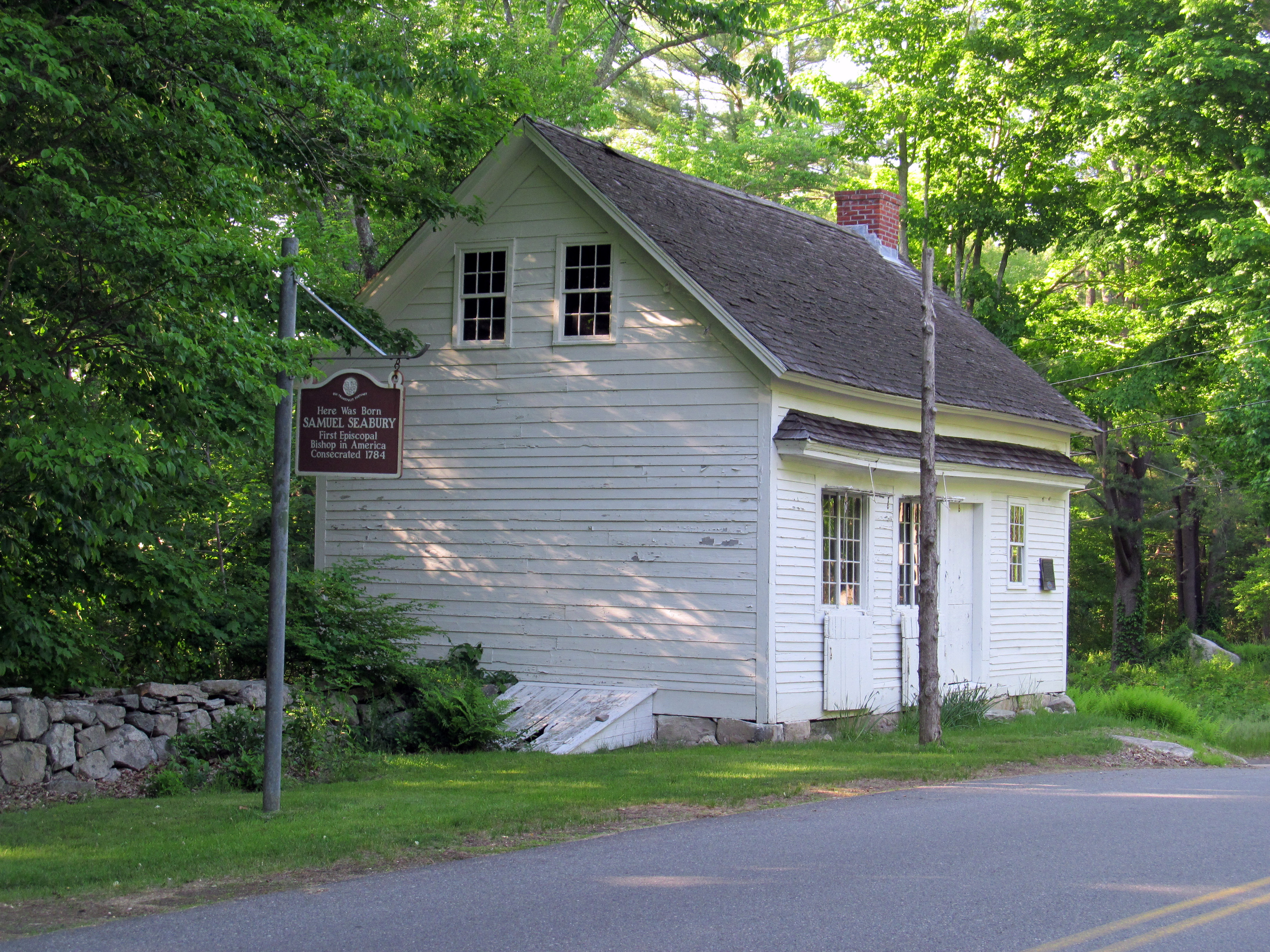
- Gurdon Bill store in 2014

- Location within Connecticut Location within the United States
- Location: 15 Church Hill Road, Ledyard, Connecticut
- Coordinates: 41°27′26″N 72°0′51″W
- Area: 0.3 acres (0.12 ha)
- Built: 1818
- NRHP reference No.: 82004368
- Added to NRHP: April 12, 1982

The Gurdon Bill Store is located in Ledyard, Connecticut. Gurdon Bill and his partner Philip Gray purchased the land for the store in 1818; Gray sold his interest to Bill for $500 in 1819. Bill operated the store until his death in 1856 and the store is believed to have made its final transaction in 1868. It has not been used since it was sold to the Congregational Society in 1875, retaining its historical integrity. The store is an 18-by-30-foot (5.5 by 9.1 m) by 1 1/2-story gable-roofed clapboarded structure built upon fieldstone and stone blocks. It has some unusual architecture in the form of a pent-roof and three-part window shutters. Bruce Clouette, a consultant who prepared the Store's registration to the National Register for Historic Places on behalf of the Connecticut Historical Commission, describes the store as "the best preserved early 19th-century store known in Connecticut." The Gurdon Bill Store was added to the National Register of Historic Places on April 12, 1982.

== History ==
The Gurdon Bill Store is named for Gurdon Bill, who was born in 1784. Bill and his partner Philip Gray bought the land in 1818. Clouette notes that four years later, Bill was the sole owner of the property; a record from 1819 says that Gray sold his interest in the store to Bill for $500. Bill continued to run the store until shortly before his death in 1856. The last date chalked on the wall of the store is 1868, which, at the time of its addition to the National Register of Historic Places in 1982, led local historians to conclude it finally closed for business in that year. The store was sold to the Congregational Society in 1875, an important factor in the preservation of its historical integrity.

Bill went to Plainfield Academy when he was 21. He worked with various merchants before setting up the store in North Groton, later incorporated as Ledyard, Connecticut. The store was eventually boarded up and left essentially unused after 1870.

== Design ==
The Gurdon Bill Store is an 18-foot (5.5 m) by 30-foot (9.1 m), 1 1/2-story clapboarded store built in 1818. The walls extend above the ceiling to an attic. The wood-shingled gable roof also has a smaller pent roof on the front facade that projects about 1 foot (0.30 m) beyond the wall, which is unusual in New England architecture. The foundation is built on fieldstone and has stone blocks above the ground; it has a full cellar. The main facade has two large twelve-by-twelve light sliding sash windows on the left side that can be covered with three-part batten shutters. The main door is a Dutch door with a plain frame and to its right is a smaller six-by-six sash window without a batten shutter. The rear facade is plain and devoid of any windows. The north end has four windows, two for the attic, and the south end has only two windows for the attic, all with six-over-six sash.

The interior consists of one large room on the south end, and two smaller connecting rooms on the north. The walls of the main room have wide-board horizontal panels and a large L-shaped counter running parallel to the south and west walls. Behind the counter are tiers of pine shelving and on the west wall are built-in drawers with simple wooden pulls and open bins on the bottom. The east wall has a plank bench. The two connected rooms on the north are similar, having "plastered walls, a narrow beaded board for pegs or hooks, simple sliding shutters on the windows, beaded post casings, and brick diagonal fireplaces."

== Importance ==
Clouette writes, "The Gurdon Bill Store is the best preserved early 19th-century store known in Connecticut. There are earlier store buildings and more elegant ones, but it would appear that the Bill Store is unique in retaining so many of its original features intact, particularly in the interior." It was submitted to the National Historic Register of Places under criteria A for being a "country store" which supplied items that local farmers needed, but could not produce or manufacture. The building also was submitted for its well-adapted and well-preserved architectural integrity. The store also has an unusual pent-roof and three-part window shutters, the purpose of which is not entirely known.

Locally, the Gurdon Bill Store was rumored to have been a tavern or an inn, although no evidence or record indicates such a use, and it was apparently a waystation for stagecoaches. A historical marker in the immediate vicinity ties the Gurdon Bill store to the birthplace of Samuel Seabury, America's first Episcopal bishop. No conclusive evidence for this claim exists.

== See also ==
- National Register of Historic Places listings in New London County, Connecticut
- Ledyard Bill
