= Harvard–Yale Regatta =

American university rowing race

- The Yale–Harvard Regatta
- Contested by
Harvard	Yale
- Information
First boat race	August 3, 1852
Annual event since	July 26, 1859
Current champion	Harvard
Downstream record	Harvard, 18:22.4 (1980)
Upstream record	Yale, 18:17.5 (2022)
Course	Thames River, New London, Connecticut
Course length	4 miles (6.4 km)
Trophy	The Sexton Cup, The F. Valentine Chappell Trophy, The New London Cup, The James Snider Cup, and The Hoyt C. Pease and Robert Chappell Jr. Trophy
- Number of wins
Harvard	Yale
97	60

The Harvard–Yale Regatta or Yale-Harvard Boat Race (often abbreviated The Race) is an annual rowing race between the men's heavyweight rowing crews of Harvard University and Yale University. First contested in 1852, it has been held annually since 1859 with exceptions during major wars fought by the United States and the COVID-19 pandemic. The Race is America's oldest collegiate athletic competition, pre-dating The Game by 23 years. It is sometimes referred to as the "Yale–Harvard" regatta, though most official regatta programs brand it "Harvard–Yale".

Originally rowed on Lake Winnipesaukee, New Hampshire, it has since moved to the Thames River, near New London, Connecticut. Although other locations for the race have included the Connecticut River at Springfield, Massachusetts, and Lake Quinsigamond at Worcester, Massachusetts, the Thames has hosted The Race on all but five occasions since 1878 and both teams have erected permanent training camps on the Thames at Gales Ferry for Yale and at Red Top for Harvard.

The race has been exclusively between Yale and Harvard except for 1897, when the race was held as part of a three-boat race with Cornell on the Hudson River at Poughkeepsie, New York, where, although it lost to Cornell, Yale was deemed the winner of the Harvard-Yale race. Due to the COVID-19 pandemic, there was no Yale-Harvard Regatta in 2020, the first cancellation since 1945.

== History ==
In the early 1840s, the Oxford-Cambridge Boat Race and Henley Royal Regatta were growing in prominence in Britain. In the New York area, rowing took place at clubs. On May 24, 1843, with the arrival of the shell Whitehall in New Haven, Yale University founded the first collegiate crew in the United States. A year later, Harvard founded their boat club. These boat clubs served primarily a social purpose, until Yale's 1852 issuance of a challenge to Harvard "to test the superiority of the oarsmen of the two colleges". Dr. James M. Whiton (Yale 1853 and one of the first three men to be awarded a PhD in the United States) and Joseph Mansfield Brown (Harvard 1853) were the prime movers in bringing about the race. The idea of a race was suggested by James N. Elkins, the superintendent of the Boston, Concord and Montreal Railroad, during a train journey with Whiton. Modelled after the Oxford–Cambridge Boat Race, which was first contested in 1829, the first Harvard–Yale Boat Race—and the first American intercollegiate sporting event—took place on August 3, 1852. In this two-mile (3.2 km) contest, Harvard's Oneida prevailed over Yale's Shawmut by about two lengths, with Yale's Undine finishing third. The first place prize was a pair of black walnut, silver-inscribed trophy oars. The trophy oars were awarded to Harvard by General Franklin Pierce, who in 1853 became the 14th President of the United States of America. Today, the 1852 trophy oars are the oldest intercollegiate athletic prize in North America.

The race distance was increased to three miles (4.8 km) for the second rendition in 1855 and to the current four miles (6.4 km) in 1876. The Oxford–Cambridge Boat Race is the only longer side-by-side rowing event in the world, though slower stream makes the Yale–Harvard Race one to three minutes longer.

In 1878, the regatta moved to the Thames River in New London, Connecticut, following a campaign by city leaders to promote the city's economic development.

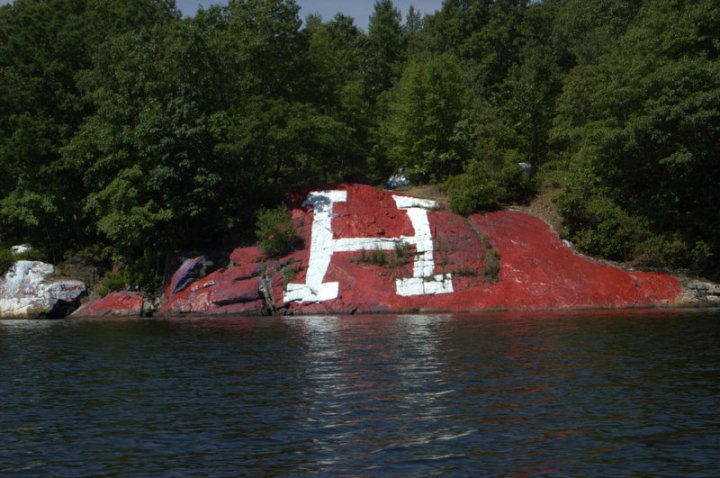
"The Rock" at Bartlett's Cove during the 2010 Harvard–Yale Regatta

Originally the race was just between the varsity crews but there are now three events: the 2-mile (3.2-km) freshman race, the 3-mile (4.8-km) junior varsity race, and the 4-mile (6.4-km) varsity race, modeled on the Oxford-Cambridge race. The varsity crews compete for the Sexton Cup, the junior varsity for the F. Valentine Chappell Trophy, and the freshman for the New London Cup. The Hoyt C. Pease and Robert Chappell Jr. Trophies are awarded to the team that wins the majority of the three races.

Typically the day before the freshman, junior varsity and varsity races, there is a two-mile (3.2 km) race between the spares for both crews. These "combination" boats are made up of second freshman boat and third varsity boat rowers (i.e. the "combi" or "combo" race). The winner of this race gets the James P. Snider Cup, as well as the right to paint its school's colors on the "rock" at Bartlett's Cove for the next day's races. Currently Harvard leads the varsity series at 96–60, the second varsity (JV) at 77–43, and the freshman/third varsity series at 76–42–1. Yale holds the upstream course record with its time of 18:35.8 in 2015. The Crimson set the downstream—and Thames River course—mark of 18:22.4 in 1980.

== Trophies ==
The Sexton Cup is presented to the winner of the varsity heavyweight race. The trophy is actually a combination of two former rowing trophies: The bottom is the original base of the Sexton Cup, with year-by-year results of race winners, while the upper portion retains the Yale and Harvard seals from the trophy which was awarded to the winner of the (now discontinued) graduate eights race.

The F. Valentine Chappell Trophy is presented to the winner of the second varsity heavyweight race. Previously used for a discontinued event in this regatta, it was redesignated in 1983 to be awarded to the victor in the junior varsity contest.

The New London Cup is presented to the winner of the freshman race. The city of New London donated this silver award in celebration of its bicentennial and it is inscribed with the Seal of the City of New London and engraved with a ship bearing "Mare Liberium" (Freedom of the Seas). As of 2014, both schools began boating a 3V lineup for this race, rather than an all-freshmen lineup.

The Hoyt C. Pease and Robert Chappell Jr. Trophy is presented to the crews who win two or more of the varsity, junior varsity, and freshmen races. This sterling silver bowl was donated by George Pew, Yale Class of 1958, in honor of Pease and Chappell with the inscription: "Named in honor of their great contribution over four decades to the spirit and success of The Boat Race."

The James Snider Cup is awarded to the winning crew of the Combination race of the Harvard–Yale Regatta, which is held annually in New London, Connecticut. The Combination crews are typically composed of rowers from the third varsity and second freshman boats of their respective programs. Traditionally the two crews race a 2-mile (3.2-km) course the day before the Regatta, with the winning crew earning both possession of the Cup and the right to paint the large rock surface south of Bartlett's Cove—typically the most popular viewing spot for the Regatta's main events the next day—with their school's colors.

The James P. Snider Cup was dedicated in honor of James P. "Jamie Sniderman" Snider by the Yale Heavyweight Crew Class of 2005 following the Harvard–Yale Regatta held on June 11, 2005. The cup was donated in honor of Jamie's years of dedicated service to both the Yale Heavyweight Crew and the Yale Crew program as a whole. In 1995 and 1996 Jamie served as an assistant coach of the Yale Women's Crew, leading the 1995 Third Varsity to a 10–4 record. After becoming an assistant with the Men's Heavyweight squad, Jamie led the 1997 Third Varsity Crew to an undefeated season, an Eastern Sprints Gold Medal, and a victory in the Combination Race of the Harvard–Yale Regatta. Jamie's 1999 Combination crew earned the right to paint the rock as well. Currently, Jamie serves as the assistant coach of the Women's Program. In 2006 he led his Third Varsity Four to a third-place finish at the Eastern Sprints, and in 2007, 2008, 2009 he coached the Varsity Four to gold medals at Eastern Sprints and a sixth, sixth and third-place finish at NCAAs.

In addition to coaching Yale crews during the season, Jamie has served as caretaker of Gales Ferry, the home and training site for the Yale Men's Heavyweight Crew during preparation for the Harvard–Yale Regatta since 1878. He has also served as Director of the Yale University Community Rowing Program since its inception in the summer of 1999. Originally established as a small pilot program, the program has since grown to include over 100 youth participants annually, providing rowing opportunities for organizations such as the National Youth Sports Program, American School for the Deaf, and the Connecticut Special Olympics.

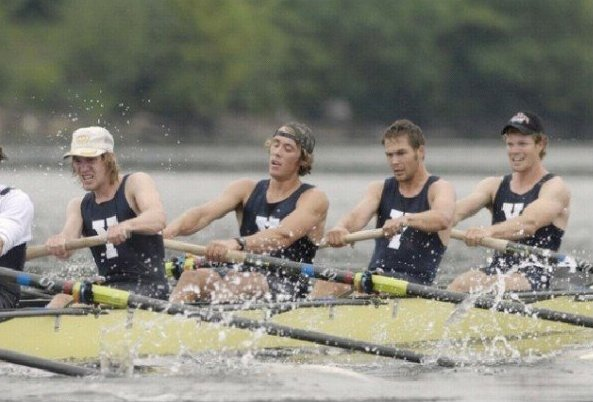
Yale Varsity bow four 2007

== Results ==
=== Varsity race ===
- Number of wins: Harvard, 98; Yale, 60
- Most consecutive victories: Harvard, 18 (1963–1980)
- Course downstream record: Harvard, 1980 – 18 min 22.4 sec; average speed 13.1 miles per hour (21.1 km/h)
- Course upstream record: Yale, 2022 – 18 min 17.5 sec; average speed 12.9 miles per hour (20.8 km/h)
- Narrowest winning margin: 0.2 sec (Yale, 1914)
- Largest winning margin: 1 min 43 sec (Harvard, 1879)

Harvard–Yale Regatta varsity race results
No.	Date	Site	Length (miles)	Direction	Winner	Harvard time	Yale time	Harvard total	Yale total
1	August 3, 1852; 1853–1854 no races	Winnipesaukee	2	—	Harvard		(+2 lengths)	1	—
2	July 21, 1855	Springfield	3	—	Harvard	22:47	24:00	2	—
3	July 26, 1859	Worcester	3	—	Harvard	19:18	20:18	3	—
4	July 24, 1860; 1861–1864 no races	Worcester	3	—	Harvard	18:53	19:05.5	4	—
5	July 29, 1864	Worcester	3	—	Yale	19:43.5	19:01	4	1
6	July 28, 1865	Worcester	3	—	Yale	19:09	18:42.5	4	2
7	July 26, 1866	Worcester	3	—	Harvard	18:43.5	19:10	5	2
8	July 19, 1867	Worcester	3	—	Harvard	18:12.75	19:25.5	6	2
9	July 24, 1868	Worcester	3	—	Harvard	17:48.5	18:38.5	7	2
10	July 23, 1869	Worcester	3	—	Harvard	18:02	18:11	8	2
11	July 22, 1870; 1871 no race (Note: The first regatta of the Rowing Association of American Colleges was held July 21, 1871, at Ingleside, Massachusetts, on the Connecticut River. Massachusetts Agricultural College won the university race with Harvard second and Brown University third. Yale did not participate (nor join the RAAC) but continued to dispute its disqualification in the 1870 race with Harvard. "Record of the College Regattas: From the Winnipeseogee Contest in 1852 to that of Yesterday". The New York Times. July 15, 1875.)	Worcester	3	—	Harvard	20:30	(fouled)^{[a]}	9	2
12	July 24, 1872	Springfield (Note: In the RAAC university race of 1872, Harvard finished second and Yale sixth among six entries. Amherst College won in 16:32.8 or 24.2 seconds ahead of Harvard. The crew generally rowed 40 to 46 strokes per minute. "The College Regatta: A Victory for Amherst. Another Surprise—Amherst the winners in 16:32 4-5, the best time on record ...". New York Tribune. July 25, 1872. p. 1. According to The New York Times, "A very strong current and quite a fresh breeze helped them along".)	3	—	Harvard	16:57	18:13	10	2
13	July 17, 1873	Springfield (Note: In the RAAC university race of 1873, Yale was finally declared the winner and the other places were not declared. "Shortly before midnight the referee announced that he would only decide upon the first position for the time being, and Yale he declared the winner of the race. The decision on other positions are reserved for a future time. Capt. Babcock, the referee, has stated to the Harvard boys that he is compelled technically, to award the University race to Yale, but he stated that the flags were not correctly placed at the finish, and that, consequently, the course on the east shore was much greater than on the west shore. The Harvards claim that the champion flags were awarded to them by the judges, whose judgment, like that of many others, was that Harvard had arrived at the finish in advance of all the crews ..." "Referee's Decision: Yale to take the Championship Colors". Boston Daily Globe. July 18, 1873.)	3	—	Yale	(uncertain)	16:59	10	3
14	July 18, 1874	Saratoga (Note: After two days of postponements a much diminished crowd watched the university race of the RAAC Regatta at Saratoga in 1874. Columbia won the race (unofficial time 16:42) officially followed by Wesleyan, Harvard, and six others, finally Yale. "It was unanimously acknowledged that Yale had the lead and Harvard second.Harvard's boat then ran into the Yale boat, breaking the latters' rudder." San Francisco Chronicle evidently quoting multiple accounts in New York Evening Post)	3	—	Harvard	16:56	(disabled)^{[b]}	11	3
15	July 14, 1875	Saratoga (Note: In the RAAC university race of 1875, Harvard finished third and Yale fifth among thirteen boats. Cornell won the race. Yale had been the betting favorite with Cornell second. "The News in this City: Intense Excitement Throughout New-York". The New York Times. July 15, 1875. p. 2.)	3	—	Harvard	17:05	17:14.5	12	3
16	June 30, 1876	Springfield (Note: The 1876 Harvard–Yale race introduced both the eight-oar crews with coxswain and the 4-mile distance, two features borrowed from the Oxford and Cambridge Boat Race. Peter Mallory. The Sport of Rowing: Two Centuries of Competition. Four volumes. Henley-on-Thames, England: River Rowing Museum. 2011. Selections published online in advance as row2k.com Exclusive Features.: "Bob Cook: Pilgrimage to Britain – The Bob Cook Stroke". Mallory (2011), vol. 2, ch. 27 (pp. 312–18).; "American Collegiate Rowing Takes Shape: Harvard versus Yale – The IRA". Mallory (2011), vol. 2, ch. 28 (pp. 319–29).; Both featured online by row2k.com in (Mallory, chapters 27–35) (pages 312–60). Retrieved 2013-05-11.) (Note: Yale defeated Harvard soundly in a race of eight-oared boats in Springfield on June 30. Harvard continued west to Saratoga for the RAAC Regatta ("the Harvard six", for the Association championship matched "coxless sixes") but Yale did not participate. Harvard did not participate again and the Association disintegrated during the next several years. Regarding the Saratoga and Springfield events: "Yale does not row there, and Harvard will not after this year, but the eight-oared bout between Yale and Harvard, so successfully inaugurated to-day, will undoubtedly become an annual and permanent institution." "College Regatta: Yale and Harvard Eight-Oar Crews Try Conclusions. The Contest Takes Place on the Old Connecticut River Course." Chicago Daily Tribune. July 1, 1876. p. 8.)	4	—	Yale	22:31	22:02	12	4
17	June 30, 1877	Springfield	4	—	Harvard	24:36	24:43	13	4
18	June 28, 1878	New London	4	Downstream	Harvard	20:44.75	21:29	14	4
19	June 27, 1879	New London	4	Downstream	Harvard	22:15	23:58	15	4
20	July 1, 1880	New London	4	Downstream	Yale	25:09	24:27	15	5
21	July 1, 1881	New London	4	Downstream	Yale	22:19	22:13	15	6
22	June 30, 1882	New London	4	Downstream	Harvard	20:47.5	20:50.5	16	6
23	June 28, 1883	New London	4	Downstream	Harvard	25:46.5	25:59	17	6
24	June 26, 1884	New London	4	Downstream	Yale	20:48	20:31	17	7
25	June 26, 1885	New London	4	Downstream	Harvard	25:15.5	26:30	18	7
26	July 2, 1886	New London	4	Upstream	Yale	21:05	20:42	18	8
27	July 1, 1887	New London	4	Downstream	Yale	23:10.5	22:56	18	9
28	June 29, 1888	New London	4	Downstream	Yale	21:24	20:10	18	10
29	June 28, 1889	New London	4	Upstream	Yale	21:55	21:30	18	11
30	June 27, 1890	New London	4	Downstream	Yale	21:40	21:29^{[c]}	18	12
31	June 26, 1891	New London	4	Upstream	Harvard	21:23	21:57	19	12
32	July 1, 1892	New London	4	Downstream	Yale	21:42.5	20:48	19	13
33	June 30, 1893	New London	4	Downstream	Yale	25:15	25:01.5	19	14
34	June 28, 1894	New London	4	Downstream	Yale	24:38	23:45.5	19	15
35	June 28, 1895; 1896 no race	New London	4	Downstream	Yale	22:05	21:30	19	16
36	June 25, 1897	Poughkeepsie	4	—	Yale^{[d]}	21:00	20:44	19	17
37	June 23, 1898	New London	4	Upstream	Yale^{[d]}	24:35	24:02	19	18
38	June 29, 1899	New London	4	Downstream	Harvard	20:52.5	21:13	20	18
39	June 28, 1900	New London	4	Downstream	Yale	21:37.4	21:12.8	20	19
40	June 27, 1901	New London	4	Downstream	Yale	23:45	23:37	20	20
41	June 26, 1902	New London	4	Downstream	Yale	20:33	20:20	20	21
42	June 25, 1903	New London	4	Downstream	Yale	20:29.6 (Note: Two sources report time 20:19.6 for Harvard, different but greater times 20:19.8 and 20:29.8 for Yale, and Yale the winner.)	20:19.8	20	22
43	July 1, 1904	New London	4	Upstream	Yale	22:10	21:40.5	20	23
44	June 29, 1905	New London	4	Upstream	Yale	22:36	22:33.5	20	24
45	June 28, 1906	New London	4	Downstream	Harvard	23:02	23:11	21	24
46	June 27, 1907	New London	4	Upstream	Yale	21:13	21:10	21	25
47	June 25, 1908	New London	4	Upstream	Harvard	24:10	(not taken)	22	25
48	July 11, 1909	New London	4	Upstream	Harvard	21:50	22:10	23	25
49	June 30, 1910	New London	4	Downstream	Harvard	20:46.5	21:04	24	25
50	June 30, 1911	New London	4	Downstream	Harvard	22:44	23:40.5^{[e]}	25	25
51	June 21, 1912	New London	4	Downstream	Harvard	21:43.5	22:04	26	25
52	June 20, 1913	New London	4	Downstream	Harvard	21:42	22:20	27	25
53	June 19, 1914	New London	4	Upstream	Yale	21:16.2	21:16	27	26
54	June 25, 1915	New London	4	Upstream	Yale	21:13.5	20:52	27	27
55	June 23, 1916; 1917 no race	New London	4	Downstream	Harvard	20:02	20:17	28	27
56	June 1, 1918	Derby, CT	2	—	Harvard	10:58	11:04	29	27
57	June 20, 1919	New London	4	Downstream	Yale	21:47.6	21:42.2	29	28
58	June 25, 1920	New London	4	Upstream	Harvard	23:11	23:46	30	28
59	June 24, 1921	New London	4	Downstream	Yale	20:44.2	20:41	30	29
60	June 23, 1922	New London	4	Upstream	Yale	22:06	21:53	30	30
61	June 22, 1923	New London	4	Downstream	Yale	22:35	22:10	30	31
62	June 20, 1924	New London	4	Downstream	Yale	22:11	21:58.4	30	32
63	June 19, 1925	New London	4	Upstream	Yale	20:32.4	20:26	30	33
64	June 25, 1926	New London	4	Upstream	Yale	20:21.6	20:14.4	30	34
65	June 24, 1927	New London	4	Downstream	Harvard	22:35.1	22:39	31	34
66	June 22, 1928	New London	4	Downstream	Yale	20:56	20:21.6	31	35
67	June 21, 1929	New London	4	Upstream	Yale	21:39	21:20	31	36
68	June 20, 1930	New London	4	Downstream	Yale	20:30.8	20:09.4	31	37
69	June 19, 1931	New London	4	Downstream	Harvard	22:21	22:30	32	37
70	June 24, 1932	New London	4	Downstream	Harvard	21:29	21:42	33	37
71	June 16, 1933	New London	4	Downstream	Harvard	22:46.6	22:53.6	34	37
72	June 22, 1934	New London	4	Downstream	Yale	20:01.6	19:51.8	34	38
73	June 22, 1935	New London	4	Upstream	Yale	21:04	20:19	34	39
74	June 19, 1936	New London	4	Upstream	Harvard	20:19	20:40.6	35	39
75	June 25, 1937	New London	4	Upstream	Harvard	20:02	20:06.2	36	39
76	June 24, 1938	New London	4	Upstream	Harvard	20:20	20:23.8	37	39
77	June 23, 1939	New London	4	Downstream	Harvard	20:48.4	20:53	38	39
78	June 21, 1940	New London	4	Upstream	Harvard	21:38	22:09	39	39
79	June 14, 1941	New London	4	Downstream	Harvard	20:40	20:53.4	40	39
80	May 23, 1942; 1943-1945 no race	Derby	2	—	Harvard	10:09.6	10:20.8	41	39
81	June 1, 1946	Cambridge	1.75^{[f]}	—	Harvard	9:18	9:38	42	39
82	June 18, 1947	New London	4	Upstream	Harvard	20:40	20:46	43	39
83	June 25, 1948	New London	4	Downstream	Harvard	19:21.4	19:23	44	39
84	June 24, 1949	New London	4	Upstream	Yale	19:54.2	19:52.8	44	40
85	June 23, 1950	New London	4	Downstream	Harvard	21:36.4	21:37.2	45	40
86	June 22, 1951	New London	4	Downstream	Harvard	21:26	21:48.8	46	40
87	June 20, 1952 (Note: Following the race in New London in June, the schools held an exhibition in August on Lake Winnipesaukee to celebrate the 100th anniversary of the first regatta. The race followed the original script, with Harvard winning by 2.7 seconds. "Harvard, Yale to Race Exhibition in August; Practice Starts Today" and "Harvard–Yale Regatta – 150 Years of Tradition".)	New London	4	Upstream	Yale	22:52.8	22:48.8	46	41
88	June 12, 1953	New London	4	Upstream	Harvard	20:09	20:20	47	41
89	June 19, 1954	New London	4	Downstream	Yale	22:02	21:58.4	47	42
90	June 17, 1955	New London	4	Upstream	Yale	20:10	20:05	47	43
91	June 16, 1956	New London	4	Downstream	Yale	19:47.4	19:26	47	44
92	June 15, 1957	New London	4	Upstream	Yale	21:04	20:35.2	47	45
93	June 14, 1958	New London	4	Upstream	Yale	22:52	22:39	47	46
94	June 13, 1959	New London	4	Downstream	Harvard	19:52	20:02	48	46
95	June 18, 1960	New London	4	Downstream	Harvard	19:41.2	20:08.6	49	46
96	June 17, 1961	New London	4	Downstream	Harvard	22:00	22:29.5	50	46
97	June 16, 1962	New London	4	Upstream	Yale	21:27	21:26	50	47
98	June 16, 1963	New London	4	Downstream	Harvard	19:47	20:15	51	47
99	June 20, 1964	New London	4	Upstream	Harvard	20:48.2	21:06	52	47
100	June 19, 1965	New London	4	Downstream	Harvard	19:41.6	20:21	53	47
101	June 18, 1966	New London	4	Upstream	Harvard	19:44	20:06	54	47
102	June 17, 1967	New London	4	Downstream	Harvard	22:43.4	23:08.2	55	47
103	June 15, 1968	New London	4	Downstream	Harvard	20:21	21:05.4	56	47
104	June 14, 1969	New London	4	Upstream	Harvard	19:37.2	20:09.2	57	47
105	June 13, 1970	New London	4	Downstream	Harvard	22:05	22:34	58	47
106	June 19, 1971	New London	4	Upstream	Harvard	20:06	20:52^{[f]}	59	47
107	June 17, 1972	New London	4	Downstream	Harvard	20:34.8	20:55.3	60	47
108	June 16, 1973	New London	4	Downstream	Harvard	19:52.8	20:39.3	61	47
109	May 18, 1974	Cambridge	3	Upstream	Harvard	16:23	17:34	62	47
110	June 7, 1975	New London	4	Upstream	Harvard	22:07	22:49	63	47
111	May 22, 1976	New London	4	Upstream	Harvard	23:43.9	24:47.9	64	47
112	May 22, 1977	New London	2	Upstream	Harvard	9:42.6	9:57.7	65	47
113	June 10, 1978	New London	4	Upstream	Harvard	23:26	23:39	66	47
114	June 9, 1979	New London	4	Upstream	Harvard	19:22.9	19:25.4	67	47
115	June 7, 1980	New London	4	Downstream	Harvard	18:22.4	18:30.8	68	47
116	May 31, 1981	New London	4	Upstream	Yale	21:39.6	21:28.6	68	48
117	June 12, 1982	New London	4	Downstream	Yale	20:07.8	19:51.8	68	49
118	June 5, 1983	New London	4	Upstream	Yale	21:03	20:45	68	50
119	June 3, 1984	New London	4	Upstream	Yale	21:23.16	21:10	68	51
120	June 8, 1985	New London	4	Upstream	Harvard	19:41.1	19:57.9	69	51
121	June 7, 1986	New London	4	Upstream	Harvard	20:22.4	20:35	70	51
122	June 6, 1987	New London	4	Upstream	Harvard	22:07	22:39.9	71	51
123	June 5, 1988	New London	4	Upstream	Harvard	20:50.4	20:58.9	72	51
124	June 10, 1989	New London	4	Downstream	Harvard	19:15.3	19:53.6	73	51
125	June 9, 1990	New London	4	Upstream	Harvard	19:36.0	20:06.5	74	51
126	June 1, 1991	New London	4	Downstream	Harvard	21:18.5	21:30.5	75	51
127	June 6, 1992	New London	4	Downstream	Harvard	19:08.3	19:45.6	76	51
128	June 5, 1993	New London	4	Upstream	Harvard	19:09.3	19:21.7	77	51
129	June 4, 1994	New London	4	Upstream	Harvard	18:52.4	18:59.9	78	51
130	June 10, 1995	New London	4	Upstream	Harvard	18:41.9	18:45.5	79	51
131	June 8, 1996	New London	4	Downstream	Yale	20:08.5	20:01.9	79	52
132	June 1, 1997	New London	4	Upstream	Harvard	22:06.8	22:10.3	80	52
133	June 6, 1998	New London	4	Upstream	Harvard	21:32.3	21:53.7	81	52
134	June 5, 1999	New London	4	Downstream	Yale	20:51.98	20:45.94	81	53
135	June 10, 2000	New London	4	Upstream	Harvard	19:44.4	19:54.2	82	53
136	June 8, 2001	New London	4	Upstream	Harvard	18:55.6	19:32.7	83	53
137	June 8, 2002	New London	4	Upstream	Harvard	19:02.5	19:43.8	84	53
138	June 7, 2003	New London	4	Upstream	Harvard	18:54.4	19:44.2	85	53
139	June 12, 2004	New London	4	Upstream	Harvard	18:42.1	19:06.8	86	53
140	June 11, 2005	New London	4	Upstream	Harvard	19:20.4	20:00.0	87	53
141	June 11, 2006	New London	4	Upstream	Harvard	23:22.6	23:30.4	88	53
142	June 9, 2007	New London	4	Upstream	Yale	19:58.0	19:57.5	88	54
143	June 14, 2008	New London	4	Upstream	Harvard	18:54.1	19:01.6	89	54
144	June 13, 2009	New London	4	Downstream	Harvard	21:25.6	21:45.1	90	54
145	May 29, 2010	New London	4	Upstream	Harvard	19:40.3	19:46.2	91	54
146	May 28, 2011	New London	4	Upstream	Harvard	19:05.7	19:19.1	92	54
147	May 26, 2012	New London	4	Upstream	Harvard	19:41.3	19:51.2	93	54
148	June 9, 2013	New London	4	Upstream	Harvard	21:17.6	21:41.3	94	54
149	June 7, 2014	New London	4	Upstream	Harvard	19:32.3	19:46.4	95	54
150	June 7, 2015	New London	4	Upstream	Yale	18:52.6	18:35.8	95	55
151	June 12, 2016	New London	4	Upstream	No Official Result^{[h]}	Boat Sunk	30:41	95	55
152	June 10, 2017	New London	4	Upstream	Yale	19:02.1	18:56.1	95	56
153	June 9, 2018	New London	4	Upstream	Yale	18:58.9	18:51.0	95	57
154	June 8, 2019; 2020-21 no races	New London	4	Upstream	Yale	18:35.8	18:30.9	95	58
155	June 11, 2022	New London	4	Upstream	Yale	18:42.1	18:17.5	95	59
156	June 10, 2023	New London	4	Upstream	Yale	19:14.9	19:26.6	95	60
157	June 8, 2024	New London	4	Upstream	Harvard	19:40.2	19:44.8	96	60
158	June 8, 2025	New London	4	Upstream	Harvard	21:23.5	21:37.7	97	60
159	June 6, 2026	New London	4	Upstream	Harvard	18:32.4	18:47.9	98	60

a. Yale ran into Harvard, which was leading at the turning stake.

b. Yale collided with Harvard.

c. Yale stroke broke oar and dove overboard. Yale still won the race.

d. Triangular races included Cornell. Cornell won.

e. Yale stroke ejected from shell near three-mile mark.

f. Shortest race in series history.

g. Yale's seven seat lost oar and dove overboard at two-mile mark.

h. The Harvard boat swamped in rough conditions, and the race was abandoned with Yale ahead. The race was declared to have no official result in January 2017, following an appeal.

=== Second Varsity race ===
- Number of wins: Harvard, 79; Yale, 43
- Most consecutive victories: Harvard, 9 (1967–1975)
- Narrowest winning margin: 0.2 sec (Yale, 1952)
- Largest winning margin: 1 min 20.5 sec (Yale, 1981)

Harvard–Yale Regatta Second Varsity race results
No.	Date	Site	Length	Direction	Winner	Harvard time	Yale time	Harvard total	Yale total
1	1899				Harvard	10:51	(+15 lengths)	1	—
2	1900				Harvard		(+6 lengths)	2	—
3	1901				Harvard		(+6 lengths)	3	—
4	1902				Harvard		(+3 lengths)	4	—
5	1903				Yale	(+3 lengths)	10:59.4	4	1
6	1904				Harvard		(narrowly)	5	1
7	1905				Harvard		(open water)	6	1
8	1906				Yale	(+24 seconds)		6	2
9	1907				Yale			6	3
10	1908				Yale	(+3 lengths)	10:33.5	6	4
11	1909				Harvard		(+9 seconds)	7	4
12	1910				Harvard		(+6 lengths)	8	4
13	1911				Harvard		(+4 lengths)	9	4
14	1912				Harvard		(+10 lengths)	10	4
15	1913				Harvard		(+18 seconds)	11	4
16	1914				Harvard		(+7 lengths)	12	4
17	1915				Yale	(+1/2 length)		12	5
18	1916; 1917 no race				Harvard		(+1/2 length)	13	5
19	1918				Yale	(+3/4 length)		13	6
20	1919				Harvard		(+8 lengths)	14	6
21	1920				Yale			14	7
22	1921				Harvard			15	7
23	1922				Harvard			16	7
24	1923				Yale	10:28.4	10:10	16	8
25	1924				Yale	10:45	10:41	16	9
26	1925				Yale	10:02	9:50	16	10
27	1926				Harvard	10:36.6	10:43.6	17	10
28	1927				Yale	9:29	9:23.4	17	11
29	1928				Yale	11:04.8	10:45.4	17	12
30	1929				Yale	11:12.2	11:00	17	13
31	1930				Harvard	11:07.2	11:10.6	18	13
32	1931				Yale	10:54	10:43	18	14
33	1932				Harvard	8:00.6	8:05.2	19	14
34	1933				Harvard	11:48.2	11:49.2	20	14
35	1934				Yale	9:48.6	9:40.2	20	15
36	1935				Yale	9:56.4	9:56	20	16
37	1936				Yale	11:08.4	10:52.4	20	17
38	1937				Yale	11:59.4	11:56.2	20	18
39	1938				Harvard	10:27	10:30.4	21	18
40	1939				Harvard	9:35	9:39	22	18
41	1940				Harvard	11:33.4	11:41.2	23	18
42	1941				Harvard	10:06.8	10:10.6	24	18
43	1942; 1943-1945 no race				Harvard	10:30.8	10:39.4	25	18
44	1946				Harvard			26	18
45	1947				Harvard	9:42	9:47	27	18
46	1948				Harvard	9:30	9:34.4	28	18
47	1949				Yale	9:42.6	9:36.0	28	19
48	1950				Harvard	10:59.2	11:08.0	29	19
49	1951				Harvard	10:08.0	10:11.6	30	19
50	1952				Yale	11:05.4	11:05.2	30	20
51	1953				Harvard	9:46.0	9:56.4	31	20
52	1954				Harvard	10:44.8	10:52.4	32	20
53	1955				Yale	10:01.0	9:53.4	32	21
54	1956				Yale	9:51.0	9:44.0	32	22
55	1957				Yale	16:15.2	16:04.2	32	23
56	1958				Yale	17:29.6	17:05.6	32	24
57	1959				Harvard	15:50.0	16:00.0	33	24
58	1960				Harvard	15:20.0	15:22.2	34	24
59	1961				Yale	16:28.0	16:22.5	34	25
60	1962				Yale	15:56.6	15:49.0	34	26
61	1963				Harvard	15:45	16:02.4	35	26
62	1964				Harvard	15:33.2	15:41.2	36	26
63	1965				Harvard	15:54.9	16:11.0	37	26
64	1966				Yale	14:23.0	14:12.0	37	27
65	1967				Harvard	18:15.4	18:27.4	38	27
66	1968				Harvard	16:02.0	16:14.0	39	27
67	1969				Harvard	14:43.5	15:07.0	40	27
68	1970				Harvard	17:35.0	18:24.0	41	27
69	1971				Harvard	15:10.8	15:20.6	42	27
70	1972				Harvard	15:32.1	15:43.1	43	27
71	1973				Harvard	15.19.4	16:02.4	44	27
72	1974				Harvard	10:58	11:38	45	27
73	1975				Harvard	16:46	17:09	46	27
74	1976				Yale	17:43.8	17:34	46	28
75	1977				Harvard	10:01.6	10:15.8	47	28
76	1978				Harvard	18:01.0	18:29.4	48	28
77	1979				Yale	14:38	14:28	48	29
78	1980				Yale	14:45.8	14:18.0	48	30
79	1981				Yale	17:04.7	15:44.2	48	31
80	1982				Yale	15:32.0	15:19.0	48	32
81	1983			Upstream	Harvard	15:24.7	15:30.8	49	32
82	1984				Harvard	16:48.5	17:13.11	50	32
83	1985				Harvard	14:23.5	14:47.0	51	32
84	1986				Harvard	15:05.9	15:21.0	52	32
85	1987				Yale	17:05.0	16:53.6	52	33
86	1988				Harvard	15:10.0	15:18.0	53	33
87	1989				Harvard	15:05.2	15:20.7	54	33
88	1990				Harvard	14:57.0	15:09.4	55	33
89	1991				Yale	16:00.8	15:43.5	55	34
90	1992				Harvard	14:40.6	14:55.4	56	34
91	1993				Harvard	14:27.7	14:56.8	57	34
92	1994				Harvard	13:51.7	14:00.6	58	34
93	1995				Harvard	13:54.7	14:11.8	59	34
94	June 8, 1996				Yale	16:42.4	16:37.6	59	35
95	June 1, 1997				Harvard	13:57.2	14:11.6	60	35
96	June 6, 1998				Harvard	16:12.6	16:18.4	61	35
97	June 5, 1999				Harvard	16:17.7	16:26.6	62	35
98	June 10, 2000				Harvard	15:01.2	15:15.7	63	35
99	June 3, 2001				Harvard	14:23.7	14:37.5	64	35
100	June 8, 2002				Harvard	14:19.0	14:45.8	65	35
101	June 7, 2003				Harvard	13:57.0	14:31.2	66	35
102	June 12, 2004				Harvard	13:46.1	14:16.4	67	35
103	June 11, 2005				Yale	14:32.9	14:12.9	67	36
104	June 11, 2006				Harvard	16:22.0	16:30.1	68	36
105	June 9, 2007				Yale	15:45.0	15:27.0	68	37
106	June 14, 2008				Harvard	14:03.2	14:23.4	69	37
107	June 13, 2009				Harvard	16:16.9	16:19.2	70	37
108	May 29, 2010				Harvard	14:46.8	15:02.4	71	37
109	May 28, 2011				Harvard	13:38	14:08	72	37
110	May 26, 2012				Harvard	14:55.5	15:27.2	73	37
111	June 9, 2013				Harvard	16:24.9	16:30.9	74	37
112	June 7, 2014				Harvard	14:15.7	14:33.1	75	37
113	June 7, 2015				Yale	13:47.9	13:43.6	75	38
114	June 12, 2016				Harvard	18:06.9	18:14.5	76	38
115	June 10, 2017	New London	3	Upstream	Yale	14:39.0	14:30.9	76	39
116	June 9, 2018	New London	3	Upstream	Yale	13:58.7	13:53.2	76	40
117	June 8, 2019; 2020-21 no races	New London	3	Upstream	Harvard	14:11.1	14:23.1	77	40
118	June 11, 2022	New London	3	Upstream	Yale	13:44.9	13:25.6	77	41
119	June 10, 2023	New London	3	Upstream	Yale	14:33.3	14:29.4	77	42
120	June 8, 2024	New London	3	Upstream	Yale	15:28.4	15:04.8	77	43
121	June 8, 2025	New London	3	Upstream	Harvard	15:03.5	15:23.4	78	43
122	June 6, 2026	New London	3	Upstream	Harvard	No time^{[i]}	No time^{[i]}	79	43

i. The race was restarted just after the 1.5 mile mark after the referee stopped the race, having judged Yale being impaired by a powerboat wake.

=== Freshman/Third Varsity race ===
- Number of wins: Harvard, 78; Yale, 42 (1 dead heat)
- Most consecutive victories: Harvard, 11 (1965–1976)
- Narrowest winning margin: 0.4 sec (Yale, 1935)
- Largest winning margin: 46 sec (Harvard, 1940)

Harvard–Yale Regatta freshman/third varsity race results
No.	Date	Site	Length	Direction	Winner	Harvard time	Yale time	Harvard total	Yale total
1	1893				Yale	(+6 lengths)		—	1
2	1894				Yale	(+12 lengths)		—	2
3	1895				Yale	(+8 lengths)		—	3
4	1897				Yale	(+2 lengths)		—	4
5	1898				Yale	(canvas)		—	5
6	1899				Harvard	9:33.5	(+2 lengths)	1	5
7	1900				Harvard		(+6 lengths)	2	5
8	1901				Yale	(+5 lengths)	10:24.5	2	6
9	1902				Tie	10:13	10:13	2	6
10	1903				Yale	(+1 length)	9:43	2	7
11	1904				Yale	(canvas)		2	8
12	1905				Harvard		(+1 length)	3	8
13	1906				Yale	(+1/2 length)		3	9
14	1907				Harvard		(+1 length)	4	9
15	1908				Harvard	9:38.5		5	9
16	1909				Harvard		(+37 seconds)	6	9
17	1910				Harvard		(+2 lengths)	7	9
18	1911				Yale	(+1/2 length)		7	10
19	1912				Harvard		(+1/2 length)	8	10
20	1913				Harvard		(+1 length)	9	10
21	1914				Harvard		(+4 lengths)	10	10
22	1915				Yale	(+2 lengths)		10	11
23	1916; 1917 no race				Harvard		(+1/2 length)	11	11
24	1918; 1919-1922 no race				Harvard		(+2 lengths)	12	11
25	1923				Yale	10:46	10:27.6	12	12
26	1924				Yale	10:45	10:33	12	13
27	1925				Yale	10:01	9:57.4	12	14
28	1926				Harvard	11:00	11:12.6	13	14
29	1927				Yale	9:22.4	9:18	13	15
30	1928				Yale	10:43.4	10:33	13	16
31	1929				Yale	11:09.6	11:07	13	17
32	1930				Harvard	11:02.8	11:17.6	14	17
33	1931				Yale	10:35.4	10:25	14	18
34	1932				Yale	8:30.8	8:16.2	14	19
35	1933				Yale	12:26.4	12:06.4	14	20
36	1934				Yale	9:51	9:47.6	14	21
37	1935				Yale	9:46.4	9:46	14	22
38	1936				Harvard	11:01	11:05	15	22
39	1937				Yale	12:23	12:14.2	15	23
40	1938				Harvard	10:05	10:14.4	16	23
41	1939				Harvard	10:20	10:30.8	17	23
42	1940				Harvard	11:53	12:39	18	23
43	1941				Harvard	9:51.4	10:01.8	19	23
44	1942; 1943-1946 no race				Harvard	10:16.6	10:29.4	20	23
45	1947				Yale	9:47	9:43	20	24
46	1948				Harvard	9:34	9:41.4	21	24
47	1949				Harvard	9:32.0	9:34.6	22	24
48	1950				Harvard	11:06.2	11:16.0	23	24
49	1951				Harvard	10:27.4	10:42.3	24	24
50	1952				Harvard	11:33.4	11:40.4	25	24
51	1953				Yale	9:44.5	9:43.0	25	25
52	1954				Harvard	11:06.4	11:25.0	26	25
53	1955				Yale	9:49	9:40	26	26
54	1956				Yale	9:52.1	9:38.2	26	27
55	1957				Yale	10:35.0	10:29.0	26	28
56	1958				Harvard	11:13	11:17	27	28
57	1959				Yale	10:45.9	10:44.4	27	29
58	1960				Harvard	10:12.10	10:17.4	28	29
59	1961				Yale	11:14.0	10:54.8	28	30
60	1962				Harvard	9:43.8	9:48.4	29	30
61	1963				Harvard	9:35.0	9:45.0	30	30
62	1964				Yale	10:05.0	10:01.0	30	31
63	1965				Harvard	10:45.2	10:57.2	31	31
64	1966				Harvard	9:23.4	9:32.4	32	31
65	1967				Harvard	11:51.0	12:14.4	33	31
66	1968				Harvard	10:45.5	11:02.9	34	31
67	1969; 1970 no race				Harvard	9:53.3	10:01.1	35	31
68	1971				Harvard	9:29.4	9:48.4	36	31
69	1972				Harvard	9:58.7	(+7 lengths)	37	31
70	1973				Harvard	10:29.5	10:34.9	38	31
71	1974				Harvard	11:10	11:19	39	31
72	1975				Harvard	11:01	11:05	40	31
73	1976				Harvard	11:13.6	11:27.6	41	31
74	1977				Yale	9:56.8	9:51.6	41	32
75	1978				Harvard	11:56.0	12:13.2	42	32
76	1979				Harvard	9:05.4	9:09.2	43	32
77	1980				Yale	9:48.0	9:42.9	43	33
78	1981				Yale	10:46.5	10:42.0	43	34
79	1982				Harvard	9:59.0	10:13.0	44	34
80	1983				Harvard	10:10.7	10:26.7	45	34
81	1984				Harvard	10:18	10:36.4	46	34
82	1985				Yale	9:23.5	9:19.6	46	35
83	1986				Harvard	10:04.6	10:27.3	47	35
84	1987				Harvard	11:31.0	11:50.6	48	35
85	1988				Harvard	10:01.6	10:12.2	49	35
86	1989				Harvard	10:19.8	10:21.6	50	35
87	1990				Harvard	10:03.3	10:21.8	51	35
88	1991				Harvard	10:34.5	10:43.8	52	35
89	1992				Harvard	10:01.7	10:26.5	53	35
90	1993				Harvard	10:01.7	10:07.6	54	35
91	1994				Harvard	9:22.6	9:41.2	55	35
92	1995				Yale	9:01	8:49	55	36
93	June 8, 1996				Yale	11:06.4	10:43.0	55	37
94	June 1, 1997				Harvard	10:53	10:57	56	37
95	June 6, 1998				Harvard	10:45	10:52	57	37
96	June 5, 1999				Harvard	10:36.97	10:47.14	58	37
97	June 10, 2000				Yale	9:42.6	9:33.3	58	38
98	June 3, 2001				Harvard	9:39.4	9:56.8	59	38
99	June 8, 2002				Harvard	9:23.4	9:38.8	60	38
100	June 7, 2003				Harvard	9:49.4	10:06.8	61	38
101	June 12, 2004				Harvard	8:46.1	8:50.0	62	38
102	June 11, 2005				Harvard	9:06.1	9:13.6	63	38
103	June 10, 2006				Yale	11:05.0	11:04.5	63	39
104	June 9, 2007				Harvard	10:01.13	10:11.69	64	39
105	June 14, 2008				Harvard	8:53.8	9:01.3	65	39
106	June 13, 2009				Harvard	10:43.2	10:50.1	66	39
107	May 29, 2010			Upstream	Harvard	9:32.7	9:47.6	67	39
108	May 28, 2011			Upstream	Harvard	9:03.2	9:24.2	68	39
109	May 26, 2012			Upstream	Harvard	10:25.6	10:34.1	69	39
110	June 9, 2013			Upstream	Harvard	10:29.5^{[a]}	11:00.8^{[b]}	70	39
111	June 7, 2014			Upstream	Harvard	9:19.6	9:22.8	71	39
112	June 7, 2015			Upstream	Harvard	9:23.0	9:27.4	72	39
113	June 12, 2016			Upstream	Harvard	11:39.7	12:23.1	73	39
114	June 10, 2017			Upstream	Yale	9:39.9	9:33.7	73	40
115	June 9, 2018	New London	2	Upstream	Harvard	9:08.42	9:11.32	74	40
116	June 8, 2019; 2020-21 no races	New London	2	Upstream	Harvard	9:49.8	9:55.6	75	40
117	June 11, 2022	New London	2	Upstream	Yale	8:19.5	8:14.3	75	41
118	June 10, 2023	New London	2	Upstream	Harvard	9:55.0	9:57.3	76	41
119	June 8, 2024	New London	2	Upstream	Yale	9:47.4	9:37.8	76	42
120	June 8, 2025	New London	2	Upstream	Harvard	9:17.9	9:25.0	77	42
121	June 6, 2026	New London	2	Upstream	Harvard	8:58.8	9:19.7	78	42

a. Final time an entry was composed entirely of freshmen.

b. Yale's 3V8 competed in this event.

=== 4V | Combination Race ===
Begun in 1920, the combination boat is crewed by rowers from the third varsity and second freshman boats, the strongest substitutes available to the junior varsity and freshman boats.

- Number of wins: Harvard, 19; Yale, 9

No.	Date	Site	Length	Direction	Winner	Harvard time	Yale time	Harvard total	Yale total
1	1938				Harvard			1	—
2	1963				Harvard		(+1/2 length)	2	—
3	June 3, 1994	New London	2		Yale		(+1/2 length)	2	1
4	June 9, 1995	New London	2		Harvard			3	1
5	June 7, 1996	New London	2		Yale	+17 secs		3	2
6	June 5, 1998	New London	2		Harvard			4	2
7	June 4, 1999	New London	2		Yale			4	3
8	June 11, 2004	New London	2		Harvard	10:09.4	10:18.0	5	3
9	June 10, 2005^{[a]}	New London	2		Yale	9:21.9	9:17.4	5	4
10	June 9, 2006	New London	2		Harvard			6	4
11	June 8, 2007	New London	2		Harvard	9:29.36	9:39.79	7	4
12	June 13, 2008	New London	2		Harvard	8:55.3	9:07.4	8	4
13	June 12, 2009	New London	2		Harvard			9	4
14	May 28, 2010	New London	2		Harvard		+4 secs	10	4
15	May 27, 2011	New London	2		Harvard	9:28	9:40	11	4
16	May 25, 2012	New London	2		Harvard	11:22	11:48	12	4
17	June 8, 2013	New London	2		Harvard	11:55.0	11:58.6	13	4
18	June 6, 2014	New London	2		Harvard	12:40.64	13:54.20	14	4
19	June 6, 2015	New London	2		Harvard	9:48	10:16	15	4
20	June 11, 2016	New London	2		Harvard	9:36.67	9:54.86	16	4
21	June 9, 2017	New London	2		Harvard	9:50	10:04	17	4
22	June 8, 2018	New London	2		Yale	9:27.7	9:23.2	17	5
23	June 7, 2019; 2020-21 no races	New London	2		Yale	9:57.2	9:55.0	17	6
24	June 10, 2022	New London	2		Yale	9:44.59	9:38.69	17	7
25	June 9, 2023	New London	2		Yale	10:03.1	9:54.2	17	8
26	June 7, 2024	New London	2		Yale	9:25.9	9:09.2	17	9
27	June 8, 2025	New London	2		Harvard	9:16.5	9:21.5	18	9
28	June 5, 2026	New London	2		Harvard	9:43.4	9:56.5	19	9

a. This was the inaugural contest for the James P. Snider Cup.

== See also ==
- Head of the Charles Regatta
- Intercollegiate Rowing Association
- National Collegiate Rowing Championship
- The Boat Race between Oxford and Cambridge (UK)
- The Great Race between University of Waikato and a prominent university team (or teams) from outside New Zealand (New Zealand)
