= Main Sawmill =

- U.S. National Register of Historic Places
- U.S. Historic district
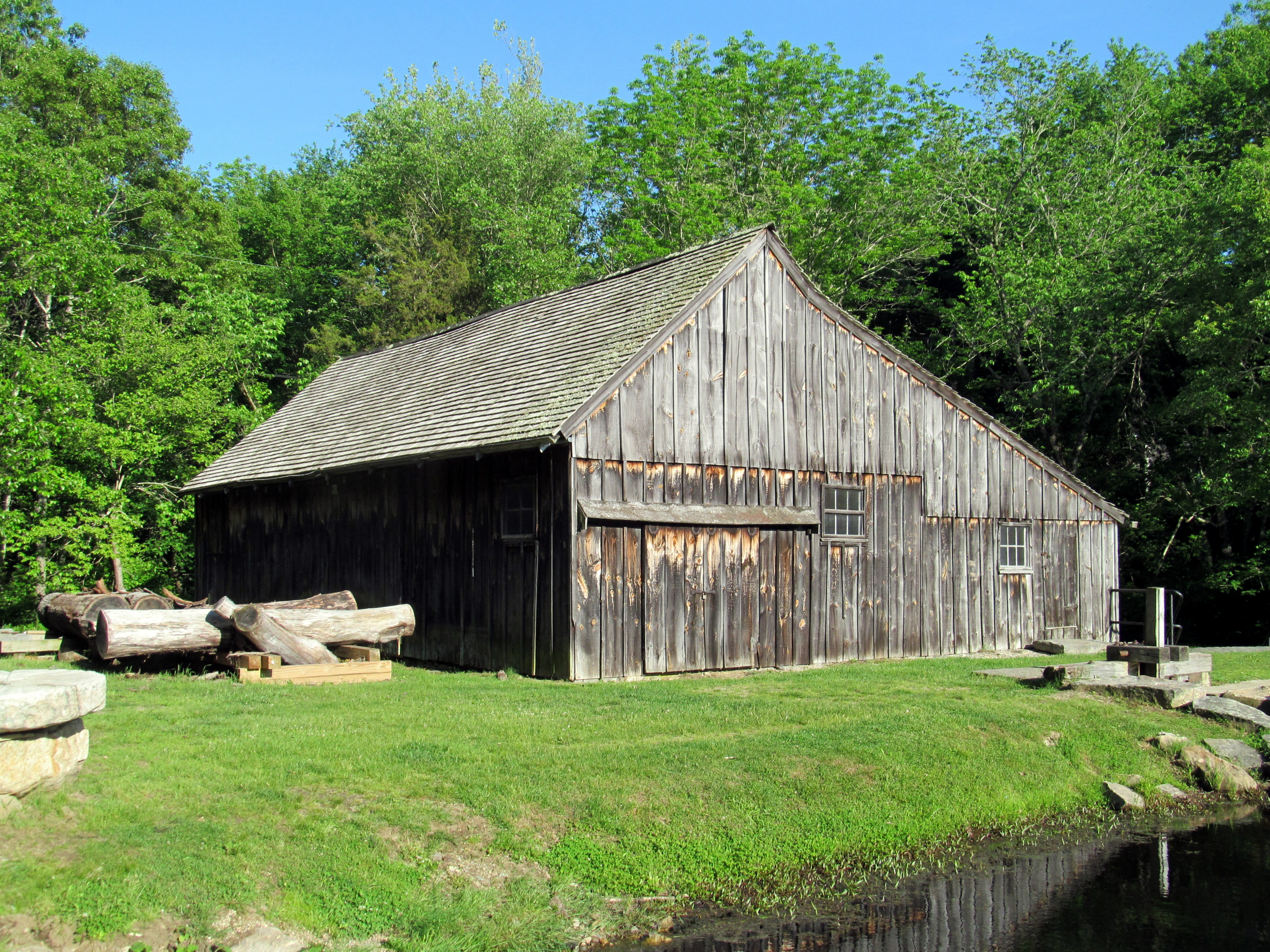
- Main Sawmill in 2014

- Location within Connecticut Location within the United States
- Location: 175 Iron Street, Ledyard, Connecticut
- Coordinates: 41°26′49″N 71°59′14″W
- Area: 11.6 acres (4.7 ha)
- Built: 1869
- Architectural style: vertical sawmill
- NRHP reference No.: 72001332
- Added to NRHP: April 26, 1972

The Main Sawmill, now known as Ledyard Up-Down Sawmill, is a historic 19th-century sawmill at 175 Iron Street in Ledyard, Connecticut. The sawmill was built in 1869 by Israel Brown, and is the only known operational mill of this type in the state. It was listed on the National Register of Historic Places in 1972. It is now owned by the town and administered by the local historical society as a museum.

== Description ==
The Main Sawmill is located in a rural setting east of the center of Ledyard, on the south side of Iron Street between Lee Brook Drive and Saw Mill Drive. It is located at the eastern end of the pond at the center of Sawmill Park. The mill is housed in a wood frame building, finished with vertical board siding and covered by a gabled roof. Logs to be sawn are rolled through a wide opening in the front of the structure, where they are rolled onto carriages that carry the log to the saw, which is oriented vertically. It is powered by an iron water turbine, which is connected via a series of belts and pulleys to a flywheel. Much of this equipment is original to the period of the mill's active commercial use, which began in 1869 and ended in 1935.

== History ==
The first known sawmill was built on the site in the 1790s by Nathaniel Brown II and Increase B. Stoddard. Philip Gray purchased the mill in 1805 and built a dam on an adjacent pond. Gray sold the mill in 1831. The current sawmill uses an up-and-down sash saw and was built in 1869 by Israel Brown. Brown mortgaged the mill and water rights to William Leeds Main in 1887. The mill was in operation until 1935. The Town of Ledyard purchased the mill in 1966 to create Sawmill Park. The buildings and dam were restored by volunteers over a nine-year period. The sawmill was added to the National Register of Historic Places on April 26, 1972. The park and mill were opened to the public on April 19, 1975.

== See also ==
- National Register of Historic Places listings in New London County, Connecticut
