= Ledyard Bill =

American politician, publisher, writer (1836–1907)

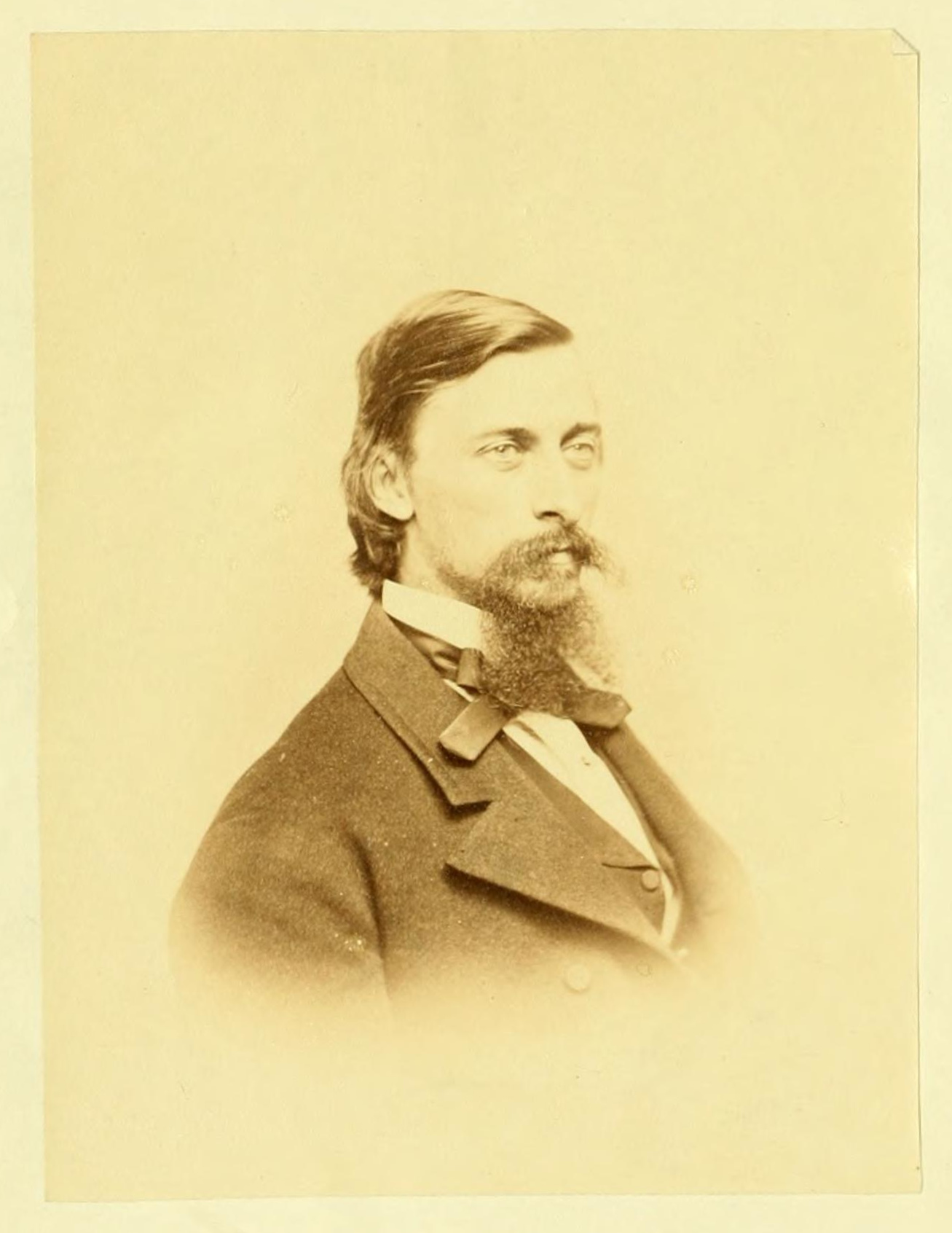
- Ledyard Bill, 1867

Massachusetts House of Representatives for District 4, Worcester County
- In office 1891–1892

Massachusetts Senate for District 3, Worcester County
- In office 1894–1895

Massachusetts Senate for District 3, Worcester County
- In office 1896–1895

Personal details
- Born: May 14, 1836 Ledyard, Connecticut, U.S.
- Died: October 6, 1907 (aged 71) Worcester, Massachusetts, U.S.
- Resting place: Hope Cemetery, Worcester, Massachusetts, U.S.
- Party: Republican
- Spouse: Sophia Rogers Earle (m. 1872–1907)
- Children: 3
- Occupation: Politician, book publisher, author, historian, farmer

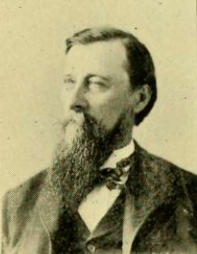
1895

Ledyard Bill (May 14, 1836 – October 6, 1907) was an American politician, book publisher, and author. A successful book publisher in New York City, late in his life he served in the Massachusetts House of Representatives and was a Massachusetts Senator for two terms.

== Early life, education and family ==
Ledyard Bill was born on May 14, 1836, in Ledyard, Connecticut. His parents were Lucy Yerrington and Gurdon Bill. He was part of the prominent Ledyard family in Connecticut and Massachusetts. For one grow season in childhood he worked on a farm, to learn the skills. Bill attended prep schools at Norwich Academy and Suffield Academy.

During the outbreak of the American Civil War, Bill moved to Louisville, Kentucky, and founded the Union League Club of Louisville. He had to flee Louisville around a year later in 1862.

== Career and late life ==
Bill founded the Bill Publishing Company of New York City in 1862, at 75 Fulton Street. He lived in Brooklyn for many years. Bill was a corresponding member of the New England Historic Genealogical Society starting in 1867.

Bill and Sophia Rogers Earle married in 1872, in Brooklyn.

He moved to Paxton, Massachusetts in 1874 due to his declining health. Bill served in the Massachusetts Senate (1894, 1895) and Massachusetts House (1891) for Worcester County, and was the chair of the Republican Congress District Committee.

He and his brothers helped establish in 1867 the Bill Library in Ledyard, Connecticut. It was moved into a new building at 718 Colonel Ledyard Highway that remains in existence. In 1873, Bill donated an obelisk war monument next to the Bill Library. Over the years the library building has been expanded.

The Bill Memorial Library was built in 1890 in Groton, Connecticut, as a dedication to Eliza Bill and Harriet Bill by their sibling Frederic Bill (all relatives of Ledyard Bill). When the Bill Memorial Library opened, Ledyard Bill donated an antique ball clock.

Bill died at age 71 of pneumonia on October 6, 1907, in Worcester, Massachusetts.

== Publications ==
- Bill, Ledyard (1864). Pen-Pictures of the War. Lyrics, Incidents, and Sketches of the Rebellion. New York City, New York.
- Bill, Ledyard, ed. (1867). History of the Bill Family. New York City, New York.
- Bill, Ledyard (1869). A Winter in Florida; or, Observations on the Soil, Climate, and Products of Our Semi-Tropical State (2nd ed.). Wood & Holbrook.
- Bill, Ledyard (1871). Minnesota: Its Character and Climate. Wood & Holbrook.
- Bill, Ledyard (1889). The History of Paxton, Massachusetts. Putnam Davis, and Co.
Books by Ledyard Bill in WikiCommons

A Winter in Florida or, Observations (1869)

Minnesota; Its Character and Climate (1871)

The History of Paxton (1889)

== See also ==
- Gurdon Bill Store (1818–1856) in Ledyard, Connecticut
- List of former districts of the Massachusetts Senate
- 1891 Massachusetts legislature
- 1894 Massachusetts legislature
- 1895 Massachusetts legislature
