= Capt. Mark Stoddard Farmstead =

Historic house in Connecticut, United States

- U.S. National Register of Historic Places
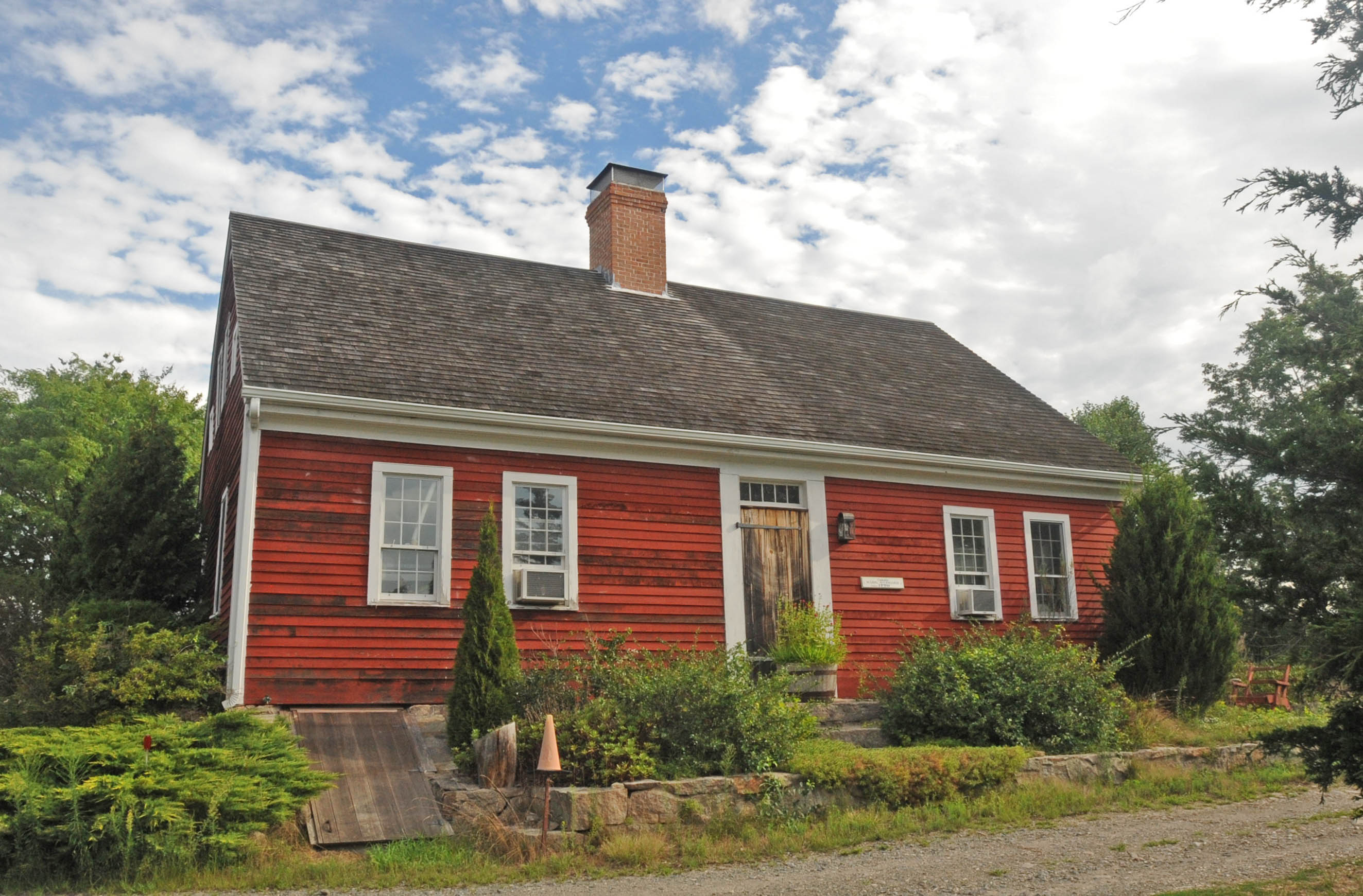
- In 2016

- Location within Connecticut Location within the United States
- Location: 24 Vinegar Hill Road, Gales Ferry, Connecticut
- Coordinates: 41°26′9″N 72°3′22″W
- Area: 130 acres (53 ha)
- Built: c. 1770
- Architectural style: Colonial, Postmedieval English
- MPS: Ledyard MPS
- NRHP reference No.: 92001640
- Added to NRHP: December 14, 1992

The Capt. Mark Stoddard Farmstead is a historic house at 24 Vinegar Hill Road in the Gales Ferry section of Ledyard, Connecticut. Built about 1770, it is a well-preserved example of a rural Cape style farmhouse, whose preservation includes its remote rural setting. The property was listed on the National Register of Historic Places in 1992.

== Description and history ==
Set down a 0.5-mile (0.80 km) drive on the west side of Vinegar Hill Road, the Stoddard farmstead consists of 130 acres (53 ha) of rural land, with a complex of four buildings: a Cape-style farmhouse, two barns, and an old privy. The farmhouse, oriented to face south, is a 1 1/2-story wood frame Cape, five bays wide, with a central chimney. A single-story ell, built at the same time, extends to the rear (north) of its main block. The nearby barn is also believed to be of 18th century construction, and is thus a rare survivor of the period. The interior of the house follows a typical central chimney plan, with the parlor and hall on either side of the chimney, and the kitchen behind it. Many of the wall finishes (plaster and woodwork) are original to its construction.

The house was built c. 1770, on land that probably belonged at one point to the Allyn family. Mark Stoddard, descended from one of Ledyard's early settlers, married into the Allyn family, another prominent local family, in 1768. Stoddard served in the American Revolutionary War, and one of his grandsons served in the American Civil War, as master of the USS Kearsarge during its defeat of the CSS Alabama. The property remained within the Stoddard family until 1919.

== See also ==
- National Register of Historic Places listings in New London County, Connecticut
