= Gales Ferry, Connecticut =

Census-designated place in Connecticut, United States

- Census-designated place
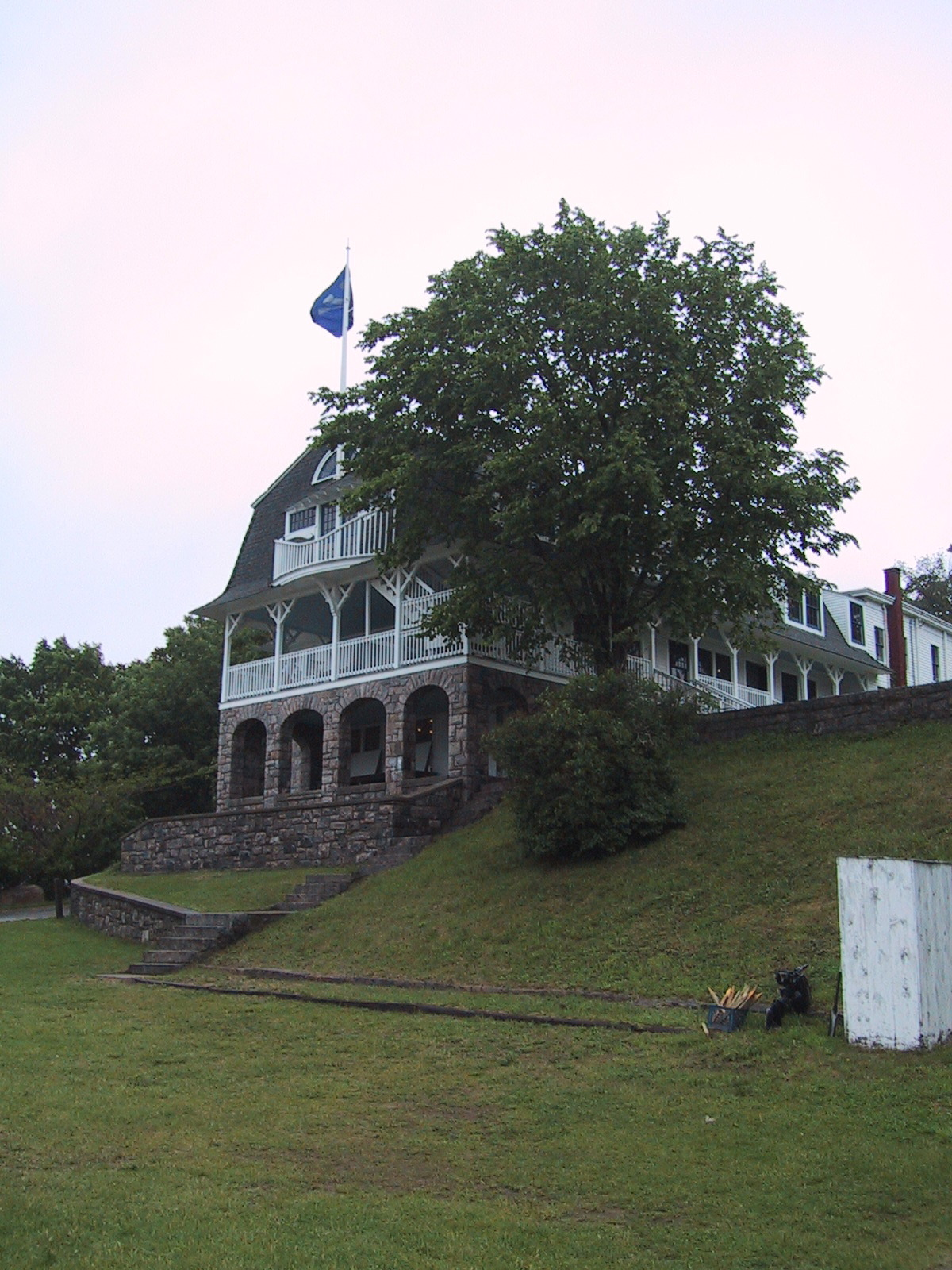
- Yale's varsity crew quarters at the Ferry from the dock

- Location in New London County, Connecticut
- Coordinates: 41°25′48″N 72°5′34″W
- Country: United States
- State: Connecticut
- County: New London
- Town: Ledyard

Area
  - Total: 1.23 sq mi (3.18 km^{2})
  - Land: 0.88 sq mi (2.27 km^{2})
  - Water: 0.35 sq mi (0.91 km^{2})
- Elevation: 26 ft (8 m)

Population (2010)
  - Total: 1,162
  - Density: 1,330/sq mi (512/km^{2})
- Time zone: UTC−5 (Eastern (EST))
  - Summer (DST): UTC−4 (EDT)
- ZIP code: 06335
- Area code: 860
- FIPS code: 09-30190
- GNIS feature ID: 2631563

Gales Ferry is a census-designated place and village in the town of Ledyard, Connecticut, United States. It is located along the eastern bank of the Thames River. The community developed as a result of having a ferry to Uncasville located at this site, and from which the village was named. Gales Ferry was listed as a census-designated place for the 2010 Census. As of the 2020 census, Gales Ferry had a population of 1,159.

Much of the core of the original settlement at the site of the former ferry has been included in two separate historic districts, each with several farmstead buildings from the late colonial and early national periods (late 18th and early 19th century). The two historic districts are irregularly shaped, and are separated by a railroad cut and some non-contributing buildings.

Several farmsteads that are individually listed on the National Register of Historic Places are located close to Gales Ferry. These are the Nathan Lester House on Vinegar Hill Road, the Perkins-Bill House at 1040 Long Cove Road, and the Capt. Mark Stoddard Farmstead at 24 Vinegar Hill Road.

== Village ==
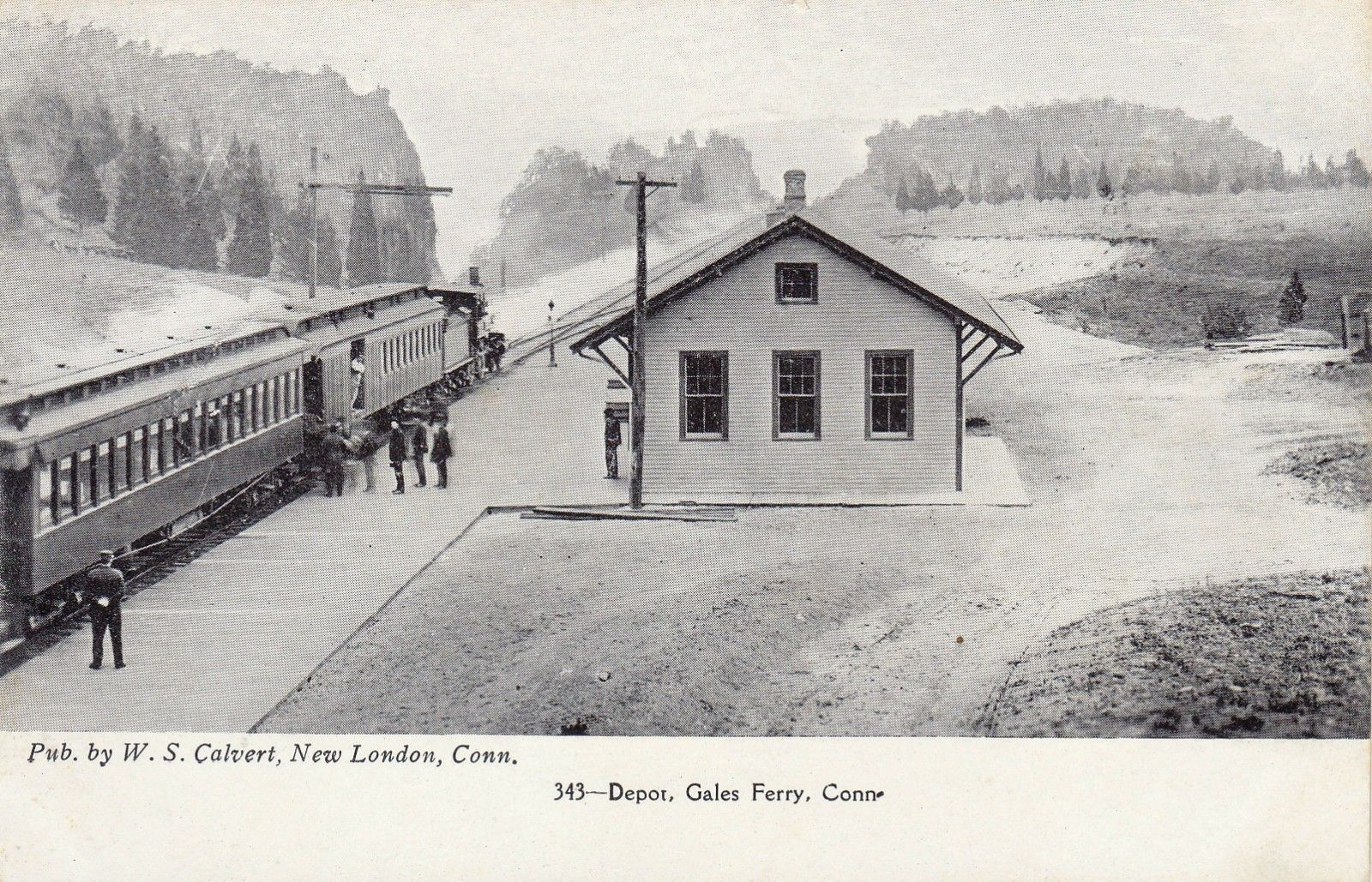
An early-20th-century postcard of Gales Ferry's train station, which opened in 1899 when the Norwich and Worcester Railroad was extended to Groton

The village is named for the ferry operated by Roger Gale at the current site of a Yale University crew training camp. Gales Ferry is part of the town of Ledyard, with its own post office (ZIP code 06335) and the Gales Ferry branch of the Ledyard library. The community has several neighborhoods, including The Village, Birdland, Christy Hills, Sherwood Forest, Glenwoods, and Presidential Estates. Gales Ferry also has its own volunteer fire department and a small marina. Much of the economic activity in the town revolves around Naval Submarine Base New London just to the south in Groton.

The community has three schools: Juliet W. Long, which is Grades 3–6, the newer Gales Ferry school, which is K-2, and Ledyard Middle School, grade 7–8. They are located off the Thames River next door to each other. The former Gales Ferry School, located in Gales Ferry village, closed in 2001. In 2012, the town began using it as an incubator for local small businesses.

According to the U.S. Census Bureau, Gales Ferry has a total area of 1.23 mi^{2} (3.18 km^{2}), of which 0.88 mi^{2} (2.27 km^{2}) is land and 0.35 mi^{2} (0.91 km^{2}), or 28.7%, is water.

== Demographics ==
=== 2020 census ===
As of the 2020 census, Gales Ferry had a population of 1,159. The median age was 41.3 years. 19.9% of residents were under the age of 18 and 17.0% of residents were 65 years of age or older. For every 100 females there were 108.5 males, and for every 100 females age 18 and over there were 109.0 males age 18 and over.

100.0% of residents lived in urban areas, while 0.0% lived in rural areas.

There were 451 households in Gales Ferry, of which 31.3% had children under the age of 18 living in them. Of all households, 52.3% were married-couple households, 18.2% were households with a male householder and no spouse or partner present, and 21.7% were households with a female householder and no spouse or partner present. About 26.2% of all households were made up of individuals and 10.2% had someone living alone who was 65 years of age or older.

There were 496 housing units, of which 9.1% were vacant. The homeowner vacancy rate was 1.0% and the rental vacancy rate was 5.8%.

Racial composition as of the 2020 census
Race	Number	Percent
White	940	81.1%
Black or African American	48	4.1%
American Indian and Alaska Native	4	0.3%
Asian	21	1.8%
Native Hawaiian and Other Pacific Islander	3	0.3%
Some other race	15	1.3%
Two or more races	128	11.0%
Hispanic or Latino (of any race)	84	7.2%

== The Ferry ==
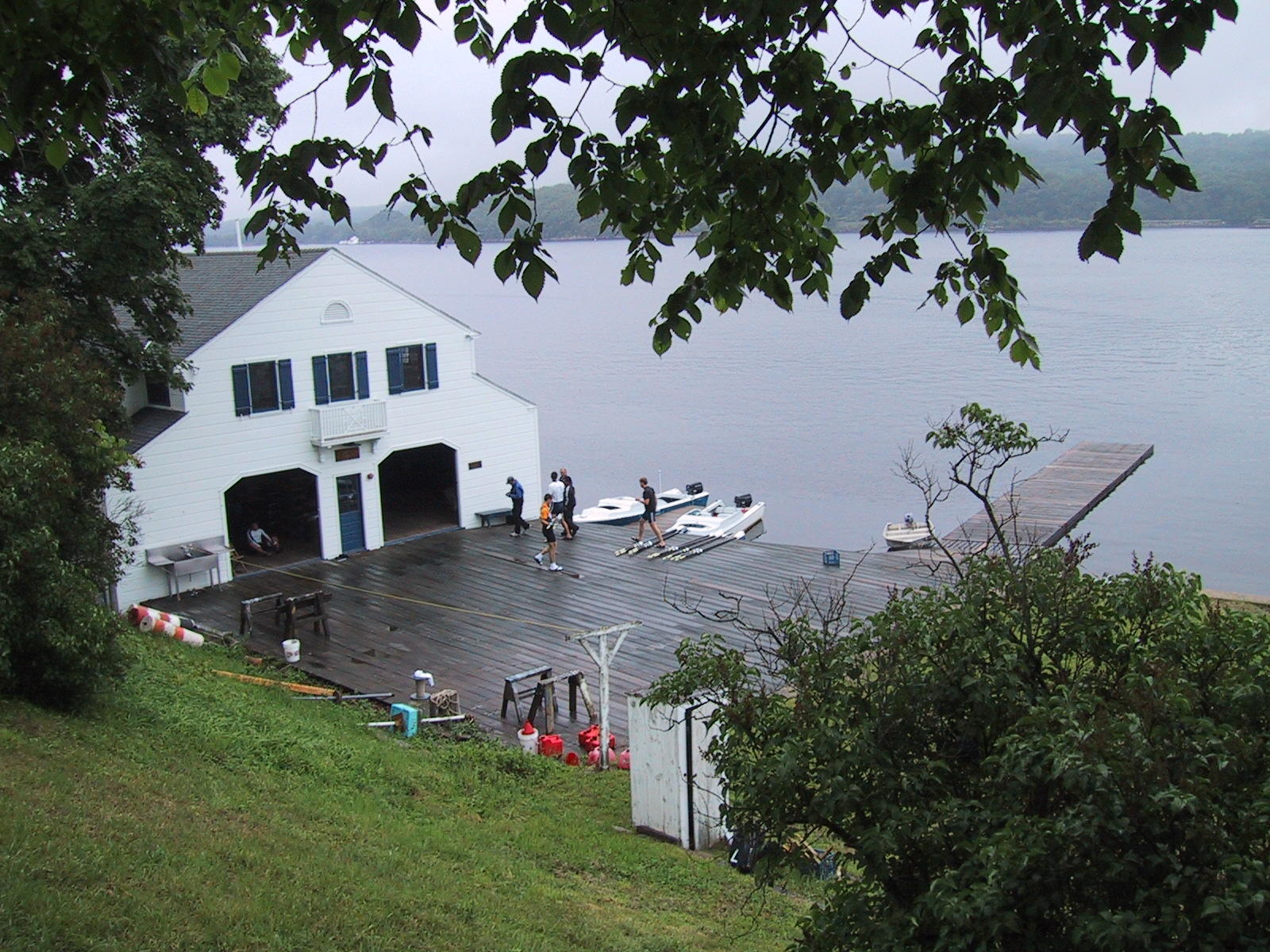
The Yale Boathouse and Dock from the embankment above the old ferry landing

The ferry which gave its name to the surrounding community of Gales Ferry was first established on the Thames in 1740. John Comstock, Ralph Stoddard Jr. and John Hurlbut were the original three ferry men. It became known as Gale's Ferry when it was owned by Roger Gale from 1759 to 1764.

The ferry landing site at Gales Ferry (41°25′50.41″N 72°5′36.06″W at 2 Riverside Place, is now occupied by a complex of buildings owned by Yale University which serve as a training camp for the Yale Heavyweight Men's Crew for the annual Harvard–Yale Regatta. The complex consists of the Varsity House, Manager's House and the Boathouse. The oldest structure on the site is the front portion of the varsity house which was originally constructed in the late eighteenth century as a private home and which has since been considerably expanded by multiple additions. The boathouse was designed by James Gamble Rogers, who was also responsible for much of the Gothic Revival architecture at Yale's New Haven campus.

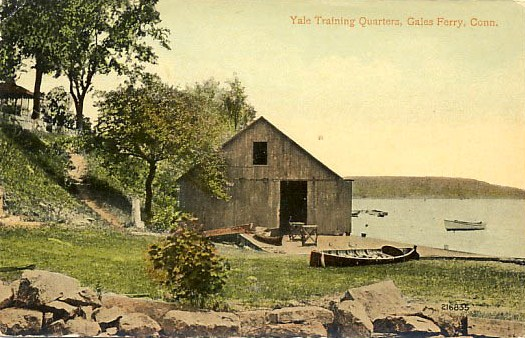
Training quarters from a postcard, c. 1907–1915

The boathouse adjoining the dock serves as a center of activity when the camp is occupied and provides storage and repair space for the boats. Freshman oarsmen are quartered in the second floor of the boathouse. Upperclassmen, including all of the rowers in the varsity and junior varsity boats, are quartered in the top floor of the varsity house. Women on the team, if there are any serving as coxswains, are housed either in the front wing of the varsity quarters or in the manager's house. The varsity house also contains several common spaces including a game room, a central common room and the dining room as well as bathrooms and the kitchen.

The ferry is of considerable historical interest since Yale's crew is the oldest college athletic team in America. The complex's buildings are filled with memorabilia and artifacts from the team's history. This is a living history, however, because of continuing use and occupation that bring the camp to life every year for the race. As the center of Yale Crew's institutional memory and the annual home of the longest-running rivalry in American college sports, the ferry serves as an important site in the history of sports.

== Historic districts ==
Much of the core of the original settlement at the site of the former ferry has been included in two separate historic districts, each with several farmstead buildings from the late colonial and early national periods (late 18th and early 19th century). The two historic districts are irregularly shaped, and are separated by a railroad cut and some non-contributing buildings.

Gales Ferry Historic District No. 1

- Gales Ferry Historic District No. 1
- U.S. National Register of Historic Places
- U.S. Historic district
- Location within Connecticut Location within the United States
- Location: Junction of Hurlbutt Road and Riverside Place, Ledyard Township, Gales Ferry, Connecticut
- Coordinates: 41°25′48″N 72°5′34″W
- Area: 13 acres (5.3 ha)
- Architect: Gray, Stephen
- Architectural style: Greek Revival, Italianate, Federal
- MPS: Ledyard MPS
- NRHP reference No.: 92001639
- Added to NRHP: December 14, 1992

Gales Ferry Historic District No. 1 is an irregularly shaped district in the area of the junction of Hurlbutt Road and Riverside Place. It includes work designed by Stephen Gray and examples of Greek Revival, Italianate, and Federal architecture. The district was listed on the National Register of Historic Places in 1992. In 1992, it included 31 contributing buildings over 13 acres.

Significant buildings within the district include:

- Guy Stoddard House
- Benajah Davis House, 7 Riverside Place, c. 1750, Gambrel
- Daniel Copp House, 64 Hurlbutt Road, c. 1796, Federal
- Sarah Vincent House, 63 Hurlbutt Road, c. 1850, Victorian vernacular
- Thomas Geer House, 2 Riverside Place, 1796, federal, since expanded in late 19th century for Yale University Crew quarters
- John Allyn Jr. House, 54 Hurlbutt Road, 1795, vernacular Cape
- Stephen Gray House, 56 Hurlbutt Road, c. 1842, Greek Revival
- William Browning House, 52 Hurlbutt Road, 1827, Cape
- Capt. Austin Lester House, 1846, Greek Revival, 5 Riverside Place
- Rebecca Bailey House, 8 Riverside Place, 1857, Late Greek Revival
- John Bradford House, 57 Hurlbutt Road, c. 1850, 19th-century vernacular
- William Bracewell House
- Capt. Latham Brown House, 2 Riverside Place, c. 1875, Italianate
- Lucy B. Hempstead House, 53 Hurlbutt Road, c. 1910, Victorian vernacular
- Samuel Brown Store, 55 Hurlbutt Road, 1899
- Yale Boathouse, 2 Riverside Place, c. 1910

Gales Ferry Historic District No. 2

- Gales Ferry Historic District No. 2
- U.S. National Register of Historic Places
- U.S. Historic district
- Location: Roughly along Hurlbutt Road, from Allyn Road to Military Highway, Ledyard, Connecticut
- Area: 25 acres (10 ha)
- Architectural style: Colonial, Federal, et al.
- MPS: Ledyard MPS
- NRHP reference No.: 02000865
- Added to NRHP: August 22, 2002

Gales Ferry Historic District No. 2 is another irregularly shaped historic district that runs roughly along Hurlbutt Road, from Allyn Road to Military Highway. The district was listed on the National Register of Historic Places in 2002. It is an irregularly shaped area, with boundaries drawn to include historic Colonial, Federal and other architecture, and to exclude more modern intrusions. In 2002 it included 44 contributing buildings, 14 non-contributing buildings, two other contributing structures, and two contributing sites over 25 acres (100,000 m^{2}). The Gales Ferry Cemetery and Bishop Seabury Anglican Church are among the contributing sites.

== Education ==
The census-designated place, along with the rest of Ledyard Town, is in the Ledyard School District.

== Notable person ==
- Casey Neistat, YouTube creator and filmmaker

== See also ==
- Harvard–Yale Regatta
- National Register of Historic Places listings in New London County, Connecticut
