= Applewood Farm =

Historic house in Connecticut

- U.S. National Register of Historic Places
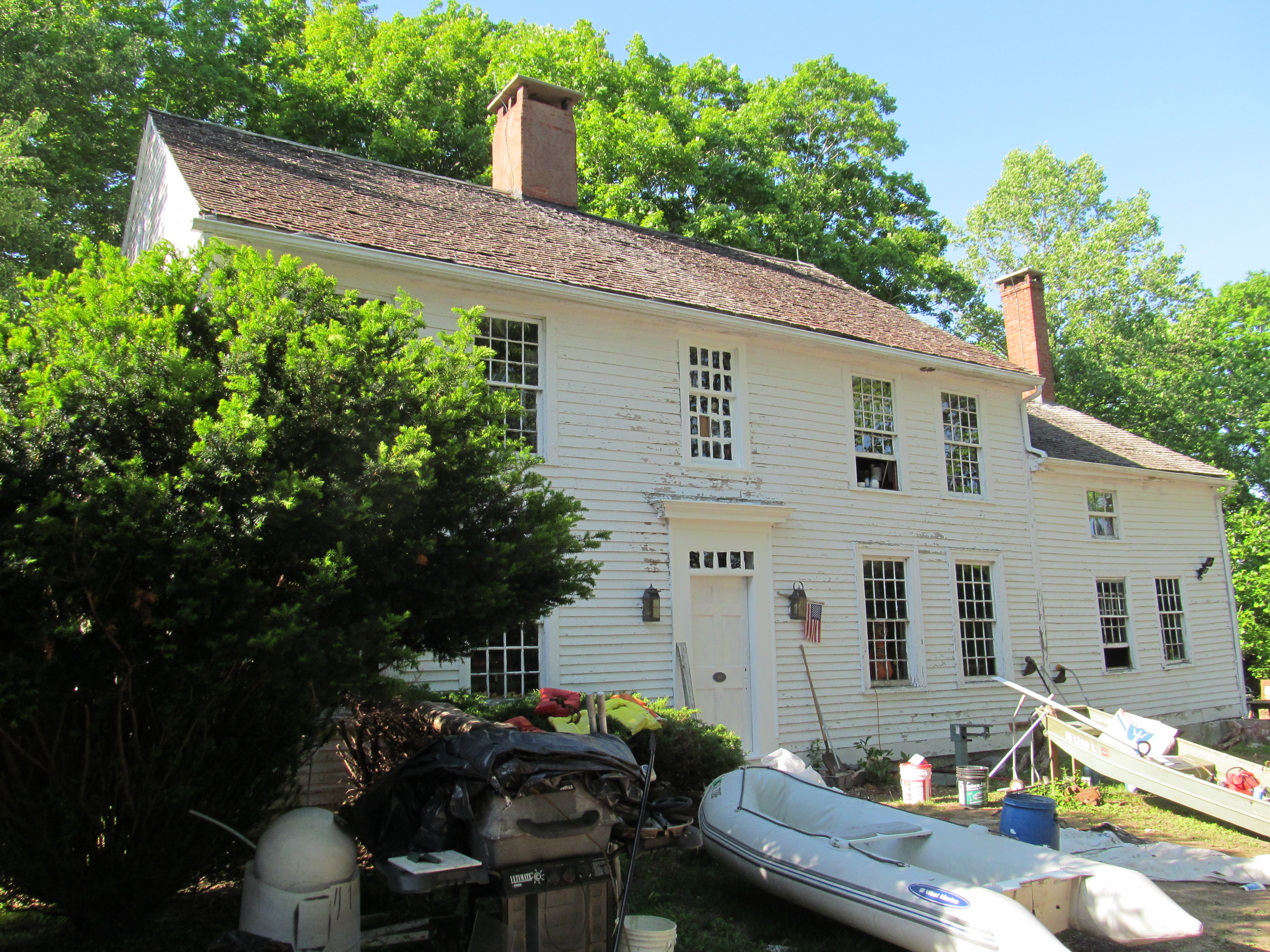
- Farmhouse at Applewood Farm in 2014

- Location within Connecticut Location within the United States
- Location: 528 Colonel Ledyard Highway, Ledyard, Connecticut
- Coordinates: 41°25′27″N 71°59′41″W
- Area: 3.6 acres (1.5 ha)
- Built: 1826
- Architect: Gallup, Russel
- NRHP reference No.: 87001765
- Added to NRHP: October 15, 1987

Applewood Farm is a farmstead in Ledyard, Connecticut constructed in 1826 by Russel Gallup and named after the apple orchards that he planted. The farmhouse was built with a colonial center chimney design with Federal style details. It has been modernized to the early 20th century without significantly changing the floor plan. Everett Gallup was the last member of the family to own the property, and he developed it significantly. The property was later owned by Arlene Meyer Cohen, and a 40-acre parcel was sold off in November 1984. The Betz family next became the owners, and it was added to the National Register of Historic Places and operated as a bed and breakfast through the 1990s. In 1987, the property included five contributory structures: the farmhouse, corn crib, barn, silo, and chicken coop. The property also has a machinery shed from the 1960s.

== History ==
Russel Gallup served as a member of the Connecticut Militia in the War of 1812, and he held the office of deacon for the Ledyard Congregational Church for more than 50 years.

Gallup built the farmhouse in 1826, 10 years before the incorporation of the town of Ledyard. He died in 1869, and his son Rufus Gallup inherited the property. Rufus Gallup split the property with his son Russell Gallup II in 1877.

Russell Gallup II was a teacher and became a Judge of Probate from 1896 until his death in 1911. Everett Gallup took over the farm in the 1920s and was the last member of the Gallup family to own it. The property was later owned by Arlene Meyer Cohen.

A 40-acre parcel of the original property was sold to Sarter in November 1984. The house was acquired by the Betz family, who operated it as a bed and breakfast. Betz owned the farmhouse at the time of its nomination to the National Historic Register in 1987.

Applewood Farm operated as "Applewood Farms Inn", serving as a six-guest room bed and breakfast through the 1990s. The property was sold in 2005.

== Construction ==
Russel Gallup built the main house around 1826. The two-and-a-half-story farmhouse design is similar to the colonial center-chimney design with Federal style details. The National Register of Historic Places nomination form states that the house's construction may have been influenced by an earlier house built on the opposite side of Colonel Ledyard Highway, but there is no evidence for that.

The farmhouse is 36 feet (11 m) feet long and 28 feet (8.5 m). A wing was added to the east side around 1842 that is 20 feet (6.1 m) by 16 feet (4.9 m) and one-and-a-half-story. The rear ell is a one-and-half-story structure measuring 20 feet (6.1 m) by 14 feet (4.3 m), connecting to a 60 feet (18 m) by 15 feet (4.6 m) shed. The house and its additions are all topped with gable roofs and were using wooden shingles at the time of its historic nomination in 1987. The farmhouse has six fireplaces, with those on the first floor made of cut granite blocks with granite hearthstones, and those on the second floor are made of brick with granite lintels and brick hearths. The house has been modernized throughout the years, including the kitchen and bathrooms, but it has not significantly altered the floor plan. The hardware had reproduction colonial hardware and early 20th-century hardware at the time of its nomination. Some changes were made specifically to meet fire code regulations.

Contributing to the property is a 12 feet (3.7 m) by 15 feet (4.6 m) corn crib that has been rebuilt and dated to the 19th century at the time of its nomination. The barn is a post-and-beam construction, 32 feet (9.8 m) long and 20 feet (6.1 m) with large double doors on the east and west sides. The rafters were made with a single planed side and the "rest is left round". Attached to the barn is an early 20th century dairy shed measuring 43 feet (13 m) long by 20 feet (6.1 m) wide. Another contributing asset is a silo that is 31 feet (9.4 m) in circumference, likely built in the early 20th century. A machinery shed dating to the 1960s was listed as a non-contributory asset. In 1987, the listed property had 3.6 acres (1.5 ha) out of the original 144 acres (58 ha) farm.

== Importance ==
Applewood Farm has served as a farm for over a century, with an 1850 census reporting that it produced butter, cheese, rye, Indian corn, oats, wool, Irish potatoes, and hay. Three apple orchards planted by Russell Gallup became an important part of Applewood Farms, as its name suggests. Everett Gallup took over the farm in the 1920s, when it produced fruit, vegetables, poultry, eggs, and dairy products. In 1994, the Applewood Farm reported having 700 trees tapped for maple syrup production, and visitors could watch the process of producing the syrup. Applewood Farms was added to the National Register of Historic Places in 1987 under criterion A for the Gallup family history that played an important role in the local history, and under criterion C as an architecturally important example of a late colonial center-chimney house.

== See also ==
- National Register of Historic Places listings in New London County, Connecticut
