= Ledyard, Connecticut =

- Town
- Town of Ledyard
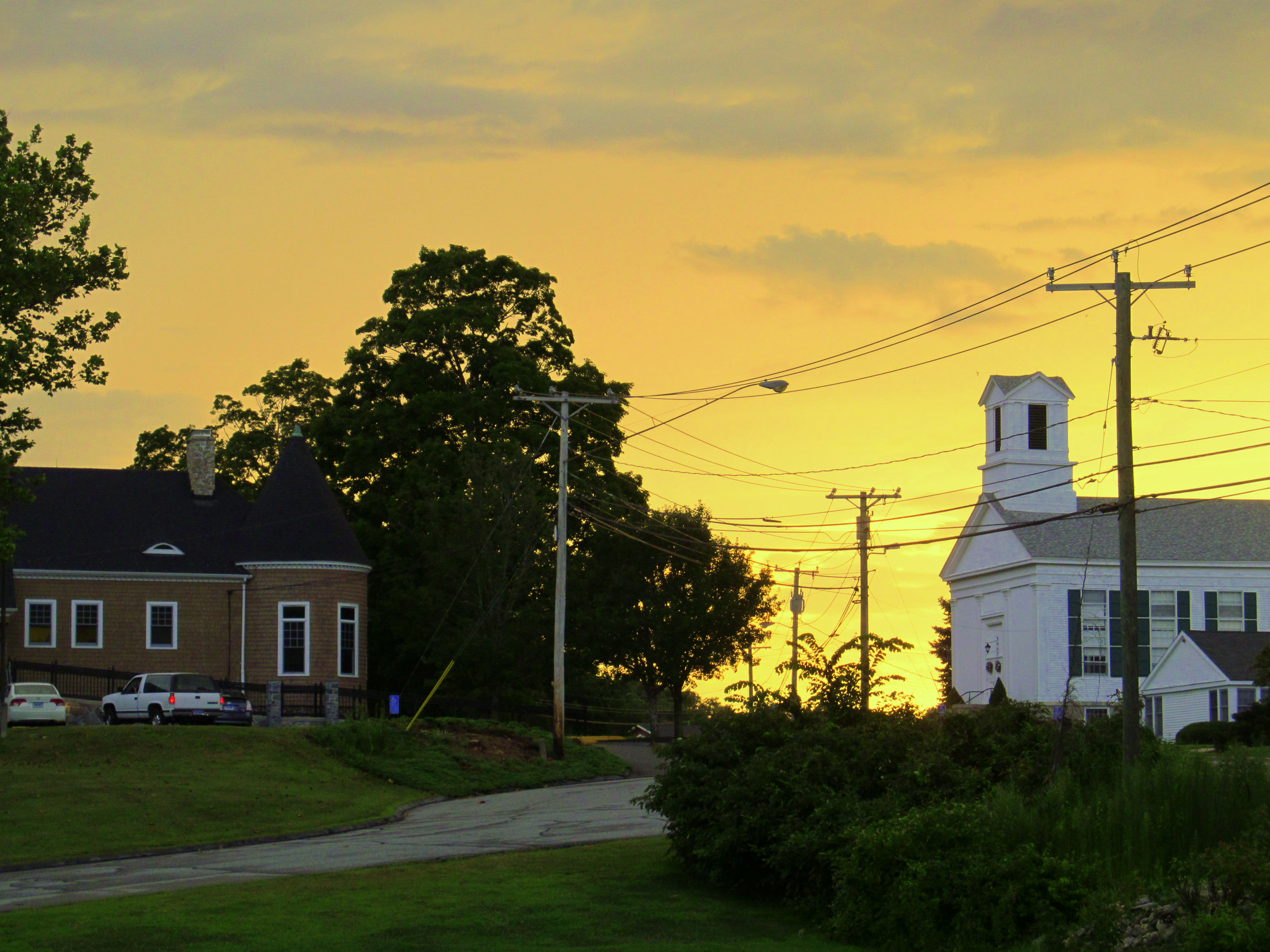
- Bill Library and the Ledyard Congregational Church in Ledyard Center

- Seal

- Coordinates: 41°26′23″N 72°00′54″W
- Country: United States
- U.S. state: Connecticut
- County: New London
- Region: Southeastern CT
- Incorporated: 1836
- Named for: William Ledyard

Government
  - Type: Mayor-council
  - Mayor: Fred Allyn III (R)

Area
  - Total: 40.0 sq mi (103.6 km^{2})
  - Land: 38.1 sq mi (98.8 km^{2})
  - Water: 1.9 sq mi (4.8 km^{2})
- Elevation: 300 ft (90 m)

Population (2020)
  - Total: 15,413
  - Density: 404/sq mi (156/km^{2})
- Time zone: UTC−5 (Eastern)
  - Summer (DST): UTC−4 (Eastern)
- ZIP Codes: 06335, 06338, 06339
- Area codes: 860/959
- FIPS code: 09-42600
- GNIS feature ID: 0213450
- Website: www.ledyardct.gov

Ledyard (/ˈlɛdʒɜːrd/ LEH-jerd) is a town in New London County, Connecticut, United States, located along the Thames River. The town is named after Colonel William Ledyard, a Revolutionary War officer who was killed at the Battle of Groton Heights. The town is part of the Southeastern Connecticut Planning Region. The population was 15,413 at the 2020 census. The Foxwoods Resort Casino, owned and operated by the Mashantucket Pequot Tribe, is located in the northeastern section of Ledyard, on the reservation owned by the tribe.

Ledyard's zip code is 06339. Within the southwestern area of Ledyard is the district known as Gales Ferry, which has the postal code 06335. In the northeast is Mashantucket, with the postal code 06338.

== History ==
Named for Colonel William Ledyard, slain commander of Colonial forces in the Battle of Groton Heights in September 1781, the Town was set off from Groton in 1836 by an act of the Connecticut Legislature. The western section, on the east bank of the Thames River, had been settled in the mid-seventeenth century by Thomas Bayley, John Gager, Robert Allyn, and Robert Stoddard. The settlers were farmers and the river, their transportation.

== Geography ==
According to the United States Census Bureau, the town has a total area of 40.0 square miles (104 km^{2}), of which 38.1 square miles (99 km^{2}) is land and 1.9 square miles (4.9 km^{2}), or 4.62%, is water. Ledyard is situated north of Groton, and borders the east bank of the Thames River in southeastern Connecticut. The northern half of the Naval Submarine Base New London is located in the southwestern corner of the town.

Ledyard is among the areas of the United States that was covered by a continental ice sheet during the last ice age. Therefore, Ledyard has its share of interesting glacial geology. The glaciers that covered Ledyard carried the many large boulders that are scattered around the town. The town has set aside land designated as a "Glacial Park", which consists of a section of end moraine and outwash deposits (containing kettles). This area encompasses a segment of the "Ledyard Moraine"—a clast-supported boulder deposit that is anomalous in nature. Examples of glacial erratics in Ledyard:

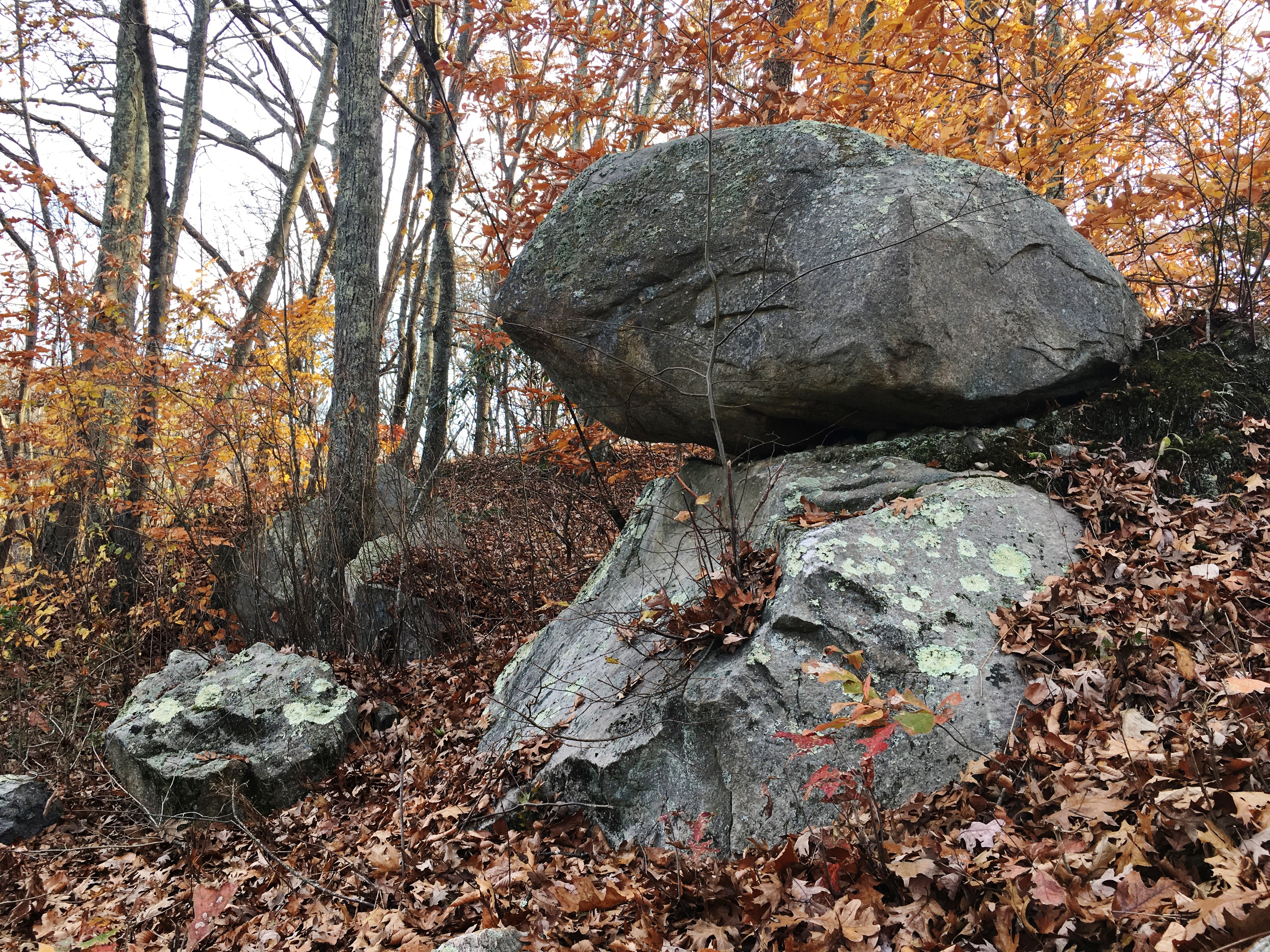

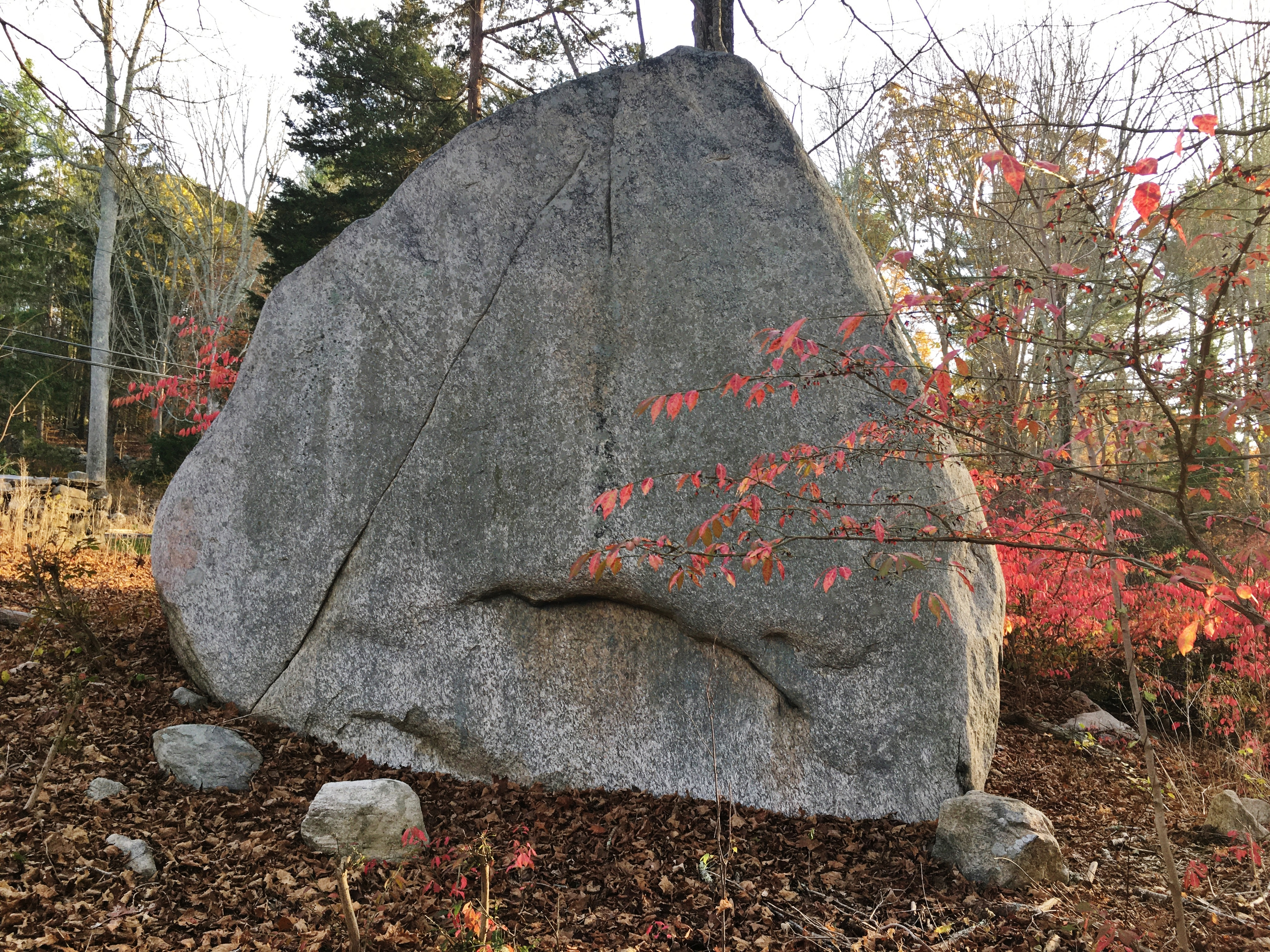

The principal communities of Ledyard are Ledyard Center (also known as Ledyard Village) and the Gales Ferry section (including Christy Hill Estates, Devonshire Estates, Ferry View Heights, Glenwoods, Birdland, Sherwood Forest, and Woodridge Estates). Other minor communities and geographic areas are Aljen Heights, Barrett Park, Colonial Manor, Cranwood Homestead, Highlands, Lakeside, Lantern Hill, Long Pond, Parsonage Hill Manor, Presidential Estates, Quaker Town, and Stonehenge. The town also contains the Mashantucket Pequot Reservation, in the northeastern corner of the town.

== Notable people ==
- Frederick Ayer (1822–1918), industrialist born in Ledyard
- Ledyard Bill (1836–1907), politician, book publisher, and writer
- Dennis Blair (born 1947), Admiral, USN retired; Director National Intelligence Agency; lived in Ledyard
- Andy Dick (born 1965), actor/comedian, grew up in Ledyard
- Doc Hammer (born 1967), painter and co-creator of The Venture Bros., born in Ledyard
- Richard Arthur Hayward (born 1947), Chairman of the Mashantucket Pequot Tribe for twenty-three years, worked in Ledyard
- Ron Jirsa (born 1959), men's college basketball coach born in Ledyard
- Anna Matilda Larrabee (1842-1931), First Lady of Iowa
- Lyn-Z (born 1977), bassist for Mindless Self Indulgence, grew up in Ledyard
- Casey Neistat (born 1981), filmmaker, grew up in Ledyard
- Jackalyne Pfannenstiel (1947–2017), former US Assistant Secretary of the Navy; grew up in Ledyard
- Fuller Potter (1910–1990), abstract expressionist artist, lived most of his life in town
- Samuel Seabury (1729–1796), Second Presiding Bishop of the Protestant Episcopal Church, born in Ledyard
- Gordon Waller (1945–2009), member of Peter & Gordon, lived in Ledyard

== Demographics ==
Historical population
Census	Pop.	Note	%±
1840	1,871		—
1850	1,558		−16.7%
1860	1,615		3.7%
1870	1,392		−13.8%
1880	1,373		−1.4%
1890	1,183		−13.8%
1900	1,236		4.5%
1910	1,079		−12.7%
1920	1,161		7.6%
1930	1,144		−1.5%
1940	1,426		24.7%
1950	1,749		22.7%
1960	5,395		208.5%
1970	14,837		175.0%
1980	13,735		−7.4%
1990	14,913		8.6%
2000	14,687		−1.5%
2010	15,051		2.5%
2020	15,413		2.4%
Population 1840 - 2000; Population 2010

As of the census of 2000, there were 14,687 people, 5,286 households, and 4,101 families residing in the town. The population density was 385.1 inhabitants per square mile (148.7/km^{2}). There were 5,486 housing units at an average density of 143.8 per square mile (55.5/km^{2}). The racial makeup of the town was:

- 88.23% White
- 3.51% Native American
- 2.70% Hispanic or Latino of any race
- 2.50% African American
- 2.19% Asian
- 0.07% Pacific Islander
- 0.84% from other races
- 2.66% from two or more races

There were 5,286 households, out of which 39.6% had children under the age of 18 living with them, 65.2% were married couples living together, 9.4% had a female householder with no husband present, and 22.4% were non-families. 16.4% of all households were made up of individuals, and 5.1% had someone living alone who was 65 years of age or older. The average household size was 2.78 and the average family size was 3.12.

The ages of Ledyard's population were spread out, with:

- 28.3% under 18
- 6.3% from 18 to 24
- 31.0% from 25 to 44
- 25.4% from 45 to 64
- 9.0% from 65 years of age or older.

The median age was 37 years. For every 100 females, there were 97.4 males. For every 100 females age 18 and over, there were 96.6 males.

The median income for a household in the town was $62,647, and the median income for a family was $69,214. Males had a median income of $46,582 versus $32,339 for females. The per capita income for the town was $24,953. About 2.9% of families and 4.0% of the population were below the poverty line, including 4.5% of those under age 18 and 2.7% of those age 65 or over.

Voter Registration and Party Enrollment as of October 25, 2005
Party	Active Voters	Inactive Voters	Total Voters	Percentage
Republican	2,350	104	2,454	27.07%
Democratic	1,879	85	1,964	21.66%
Unaffiliated	4,404	245	4,649	51.27%
Libertarian	0	0	0	0.0%
Total	8,633	434	9,067	100%

== Schools ==
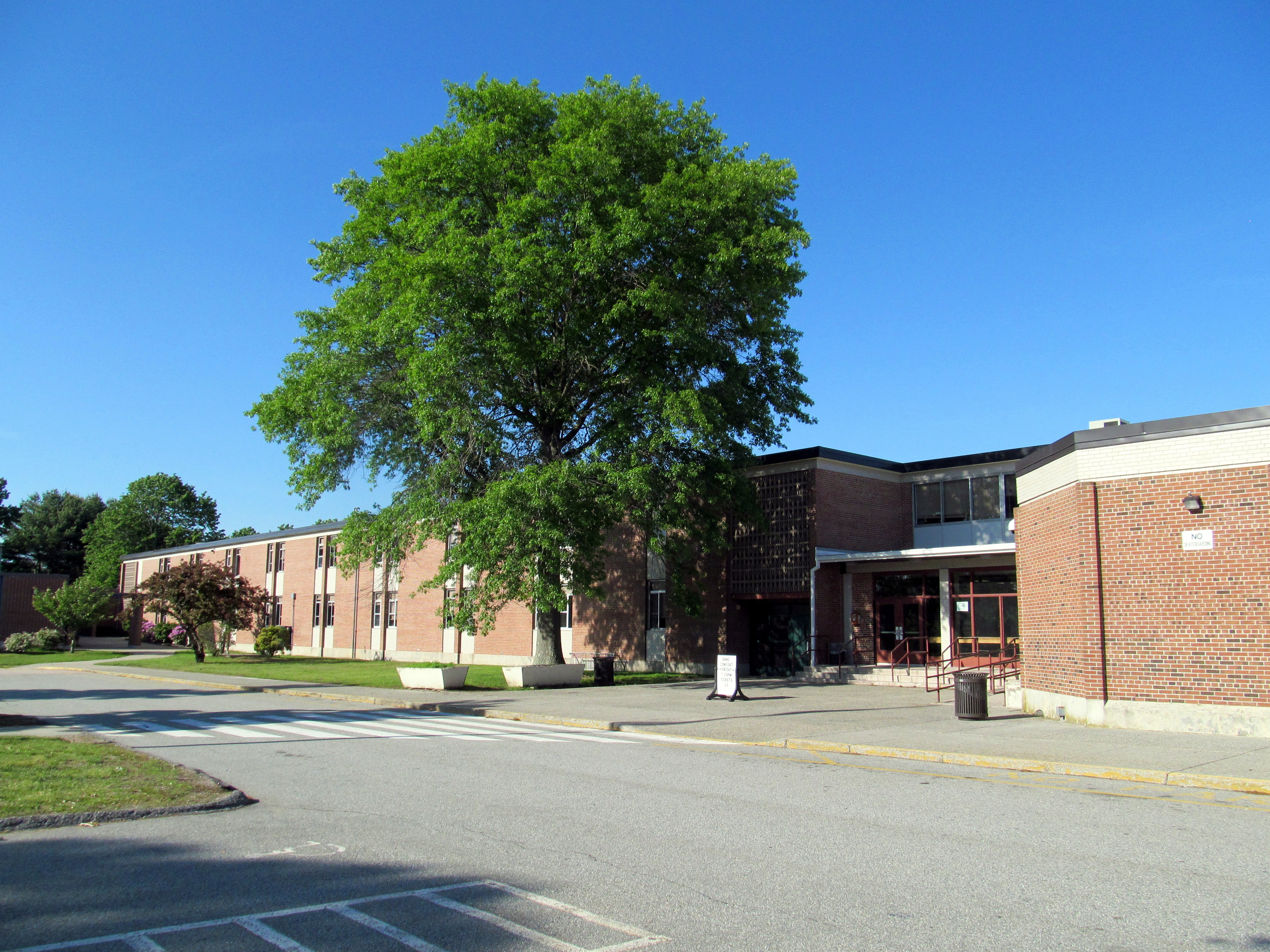
Ledyard High School in 2014

Ledyard has three elementary schools, a middle school and a high school. The superintendent of schools is Jason Hartling. The assistant superintendent of schools is Dr. Jennifer Byars, who previously served as principal and assistant principal of many of the town's schools. The superintendent is appointed by the board of education.

Elementary schools:

- Gales Ferry School (Grades K through 2)
- Gallup Hill School (Grades K through 5)
- Juliet W. Long School (Grades 3 through 5)

Middle school:

- Ledyard Middle School (Grades 6, 7 & 8)

High school:

- Ledyard High School (Grades 9 through 12)

Former schools:

- Ledyard Center School (Closed in 2019)

== Government and emergency services ==
The Town of Ledyard is governed by the mayor–council form of government. The mayor is elected by registered voters and serves as the town's full-time administrator and chief executive; elected mayors serve for a term of 4 years and there are no term-limits. The mayor, with advice from the town council and voters appoints officials to positions such as: Town Clerk, Town Attorney, Director of Finance, Director of Public Works, and many of the other administrative positions. The town council appoints officials to a number of boards and commissions, as well as fire marshals and town treasurer. Registered voters also elect the members of the board of education.

=== Police ===
The Town of Ledyard operates an independent police force, administered by Chief of Police John Rich. The town previously had provided police services through the Resident State Trooper Program. The department employs 22 highly trained personnel, including the chief, captain, lieutenant, an administrative assistant, and one detective.

The Town of Ledyard Police Department is also tasked with operating the Ledyard Animal Control Division and the Ledyard Emergency Communications Center. The LECC has 7 full-time 911 Dispatchers and provides 911 service to both the Town of Ledyard and the Town of Preston.

=== Fire and EMS service ===
There are two fire departments in the Town of Ledyard. They are the Ledyard Fire Company and the Gales Ferry Fire Company. Both departments rely on volunteers for staffing, along with paid firefighters that staff both departments Monday thru Friday. EMS service is the responsibility of American Ambulance Service, Inc. American Ambulance took over EMS service on July 1, 2018, following the disbanding of the Ledyard Volunteer Emergency Squad. American Ambulance houses 1 ambulance within the Town of Ledyard, which is staffed 24 hours a day.

== Employers ==
The Naval Submarine Base New London, located immediately south of Ledyard in Groton, is a significant employer of Ledyard residents. Other major employers include Foxwoods Resort Casino, Electric Boat, and Pfizer.

== Media ==
=== Television ===
Ledyard was featured on an episode of the MTV show MADE, in which Katherine, a shy, book-loving teenager, is made into Miss Congeniality in her town's beauty pageant for Miss Ledyard Fair.

== Points of interest ==
- Allyn's Point on the Thames River

=== National Register of Historic Places ===
- Applewood Farm – founded in 1826, it was listed on the NRHP in 1987.
- Gurdon Bill Store – built in 1818, it was added to the NRHP in 1982.
- Nathan Lester House – built in 1793, it was listed on the National Register of Historic Places in 1972.
- Main Sawmill – built in 1869, it was added to the NRHP in 1972.
- Mashantucket Pequot Reservation Archeological District – added to the NRHP and declared a U.S. National Historic Landmark in 1993.
- Perkins-Bill House – built in 1781, it was listed on the National Register of Historic Places in 2000.
- Capt. Mark Stoddard Farmstead – built in 1770, it was listed on the National Register of Historic Places in 1992.

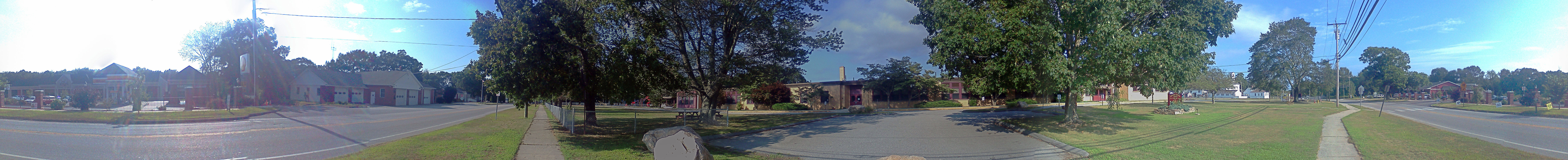
Panorama of Ledyard Center, including the fire department, town hall, Ledyard Center School, and Ledyard Congregational Church plus several businesses

== See also ==
- Connecticut Indian Land Claims Settlement
