= Nathan Lester House =

Historic house in Connecticut, United States

- The Nathan Lester House Museum and Tool Museum
- U.S. National Register of Historic Places
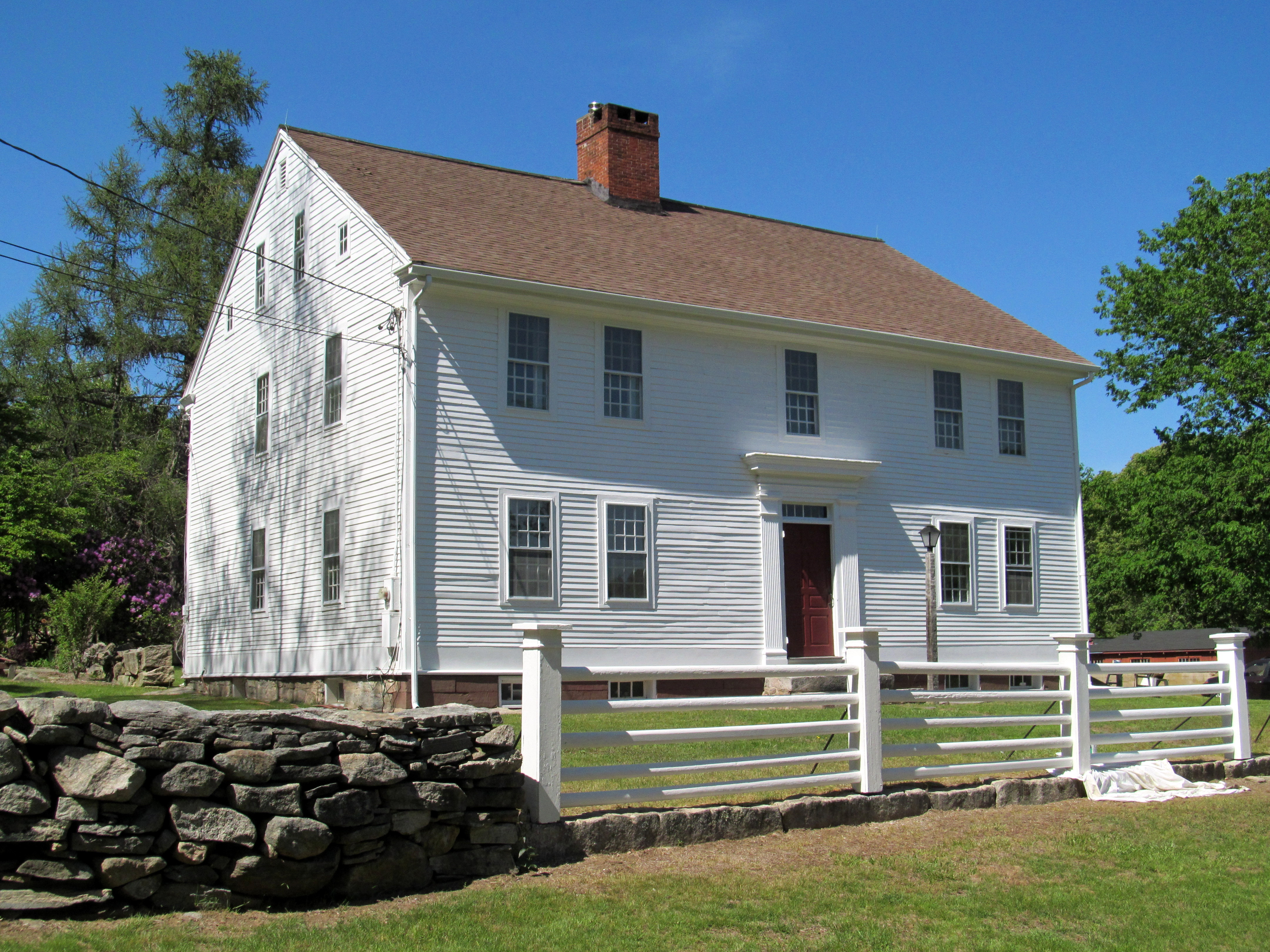
- Nathan Lester House photographed in 2014

- Location within Connecticut Location within the United States
- Location: 153 Vinegar Hill Road, Ledyard, Connecticut
- Coordinates: 41°25′24″N 72°3′8″W
- Area: 156 acres (63 ha)
- Built: 1793
- NRHP reference No.: 72001328
- Added to NRHP: June 30, 1972

The Nathan Lester House is a historic house museum at 153 Vinegar Hill Road in the Gales Ferry section of Ledyard, Connecticut. Built in 1793, it is a well-preserved example of an unpretentious late 18th-century farmhouse, and one of the few houses of that age left in the town. It is located on over 156 acres (63 ha) of land, now owned by the town, which serves as a park and conservation land with trails.

== Description and history ==
The Nathan Lester House is located in a rural setting east of the village of Gales Ferry, on the east side of Vinegar Hill Road at its junction with Long Cove Road. The 156-acre property is mostly wooded, with a long drive providing access to the farmstead. The main house is a 2 1/2-story wood-frame structure, five bays wide, with a side-gable roof, clapboard siding, and a large central chimney. The interior follows a typical central chimney plan, with a narrow entry vestibule that has a winding staircase, and parlors to either side of the chimney. The kitchen extends across much of the rear, with a large fireplace and bake oven. Small chambers at the rear corners may have served as pantry space or bedrooms originally; one now connects to ells extending to the rear of the main block.

The house was built in 1793 by Nathan Lester, on land that had been purchased by his grandfather Peter. It is one of small number of 18th century houses in the town. The property historically included a large oak tree of great antiquity, whose trunk had a diameter in excess of 5 feet (1.5 m); it died in 1970. The property remained in the Lester family until 1908; the area surrounding the farmhouse was given to the town by the Graves family owner in 1970.

The House, outbuildings and barn museum are owned by the Ledyard Historic District Commission. The Ledyard Historical Society owns the Farm tools in the barns and Furniture in the house. The park and field is open to the public sun rise to sun set. The house and barn is open Memorial day through Halloween Saturday and Sunday 1pm to 4:30pm.

== See also ==
- National Register of Historic Places listings in New London County, Connecticut
