= James Wren =

American politician, military officer, and architect (1728–1815)

Sheriff of Fairfax County, Virginia
- In office 1792–1797
- Preceded by: Charles Little
- Succeeded by: John Moss

Personal details
- Born: 1728 King George County, Virginia, British America
- Died: 1815 (aged 86–87) Falls Church, Virginia, US

Military service
- Allegiance: United States
- Branch/service: Continental Army
- Years of service: 1776–1783
- Rank: Colonel
- Battles/wars: American Revolutionary War

James Wren (1728 – 1815) was an American politician, judge, military officer, architect, and merchant. Historians regard Wren as one of colonial Virginia's only architects of record.

== Early life and family ==
Wren was born in King George County, Virginia, in 1728, the son of John and Ann Turner Wren. He was a first cousin of Christopher Wren. From an early age, he learned the skills of carpentry.

In 1755, Wren moved to Truro Parish in Fairfax County. Wren was an active merchant during this period. His early clients included George Washington, who became a personal friend.

== Later life ==
=== Public and military service ===
In 1765, Wren was elected (with 205 votes) as a Vestry chosen for Fairfax Parish, Virginia. During the American Revolutionary War, Wren served in the American Continental Army as a Colonel of the Fairfax County Militia. During the war, he also served as Commissioner of Provisional Law for Fairfax County. Wren later served in various political posts including Fairfax Commissioner of Tax, Justice of the Fairfax County Court, and Fairfax County Sheriff (1792 to 1797). During the period of his public service, he acquired extensive land holdings in Fairfax and Loudoun Counties.

=== Architecture ===
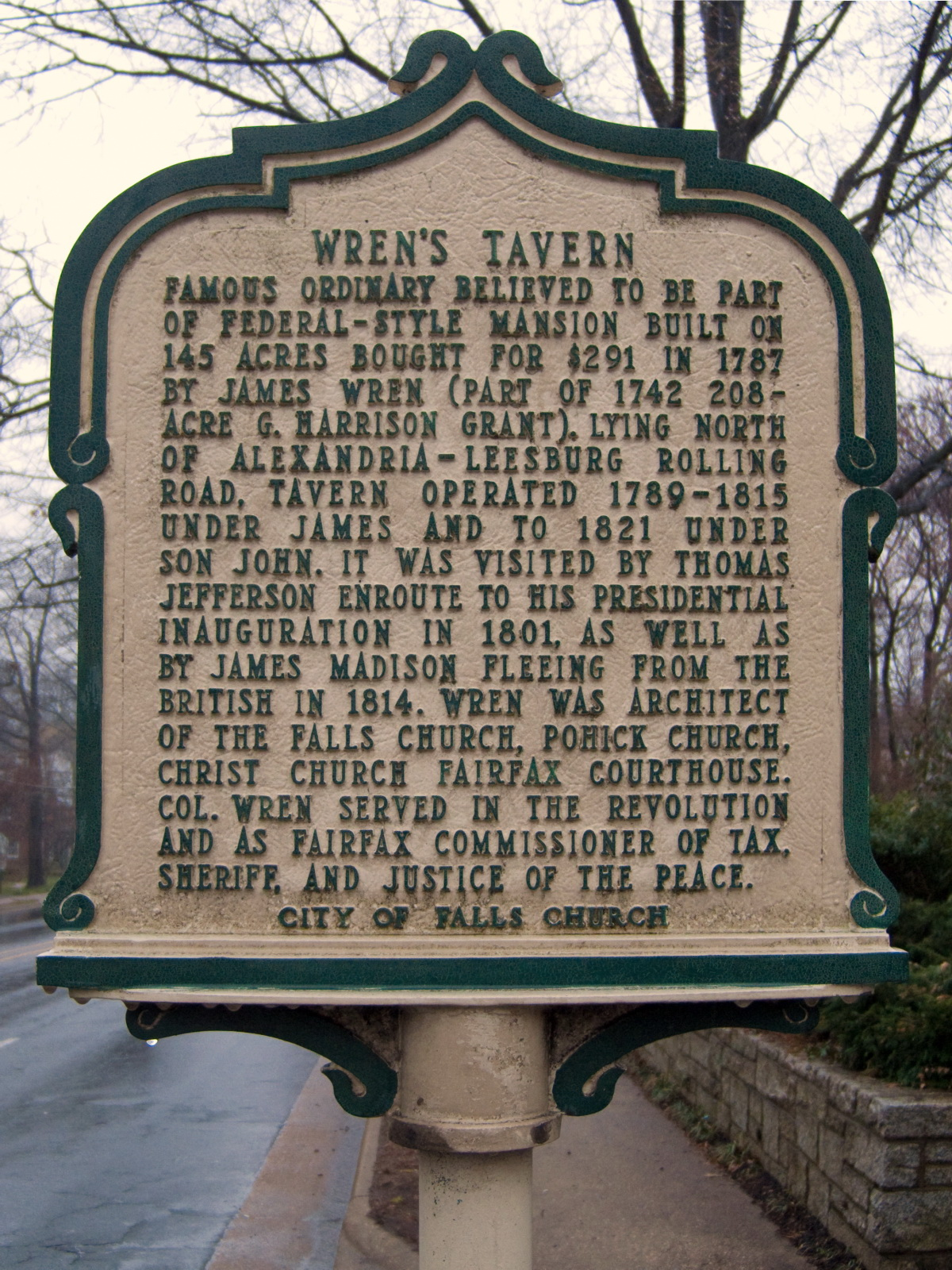
City of Falls Church Historical Marker at the site of Wren's Tavern

By the 1760s, he had earned a reputation as a skilled architect. Historians have suggested than Wren may have been the architect of George Mason's residence, Gunston Hall. Wren was the architect of The Falls Church which was built using the labor of enslaved people in 1767. During the construction, he stayed at Mount Vernon as a guest of George Washington. In 1773, Wren designed Christ Church in Alexandria, Virginia. The chancel is decorated on both sides with hand-lettered plaques displaying the Decalogue, the Lord's Prayer, the Apostles' Creed, and the Golden Rule. These plaques are original to the church, and were hand-painted by Wren. Wren was the architect of the Pohick Church in 1774 and may have received input from George Washington and George Mason in the design. In 1799, Wren was the architect of the Fairfax County Courthouse.

=== Wren's Tavern ===
Beginning in 1789, Wren was the owner and operator of "Wren's Tavern," an inn and tavern in Falls Church. In 1801, the tavern was visited by Thomas Jefferson en route to his presidential inauguration. In the same year, Jefferson wrote Secretary of State James Madison warning him of the perilous nature of the public roads in Northern Virginia, and advised, "You had better start as soon as you can see to drive, breakfast at Colonel Wren's, and come here for dinner." During the Burning of Washington in 1814, President James Madison and Attorney General William Pinkney stayed the night at his tavern.

== Death ==
Wren died in 1815. At the time of his death, Wren owned 20 enslaved persons.
