= William Payne (sheriff) =

American sheriff

William Payne (July 31, 1725 – July 12, 1782) was a Virginia gentleman, vestryman, justice, and Fairfax County sheriff in the late colonial period. He was a supporter of the American Independence movement and a member of the Fairfax County Committee for Safety. In 1755, he had a physical altercation with George Washington over an election issue for the Virginia House of Burgesses which almost resulted in a duel. The two became friends serving together in a number of roles later in life. His eldest son was a pallbearer at Washington's funeral.

== Personal life ==
William Payne was born July 31, 1725, in Westmoreland Country, Virginia, the second son of William Payne (1692–1776) and Alicia (Jones) Payne (Died October 31, 1760). He was married to Susannah Clarke (1721–1771) on February 3, 1748, in a ceremony officiated by the Reverend Charles Green, First Rector of Pohick Church, Truro Parish. It was a second marriage for Susannah (also known as Susan) Clarke, who was the widow of Nathaniel Brown. The couple had seven children:

- Alicia Payne (1749–1837)
- William Payne (Colonel) (1751–1813)
- Mary Payne (1753–1860)
- Benjamin Clark Payne (1755–1789)
- Penelope Payne (1757–1785)
- Anne Payne (1757–1788)
- Devaul (variously spelled Devall and Duval) Payne (1764– )

Susannah Clarke died 22 Feb 1771. William Payne died 12 July 1782 in Fairfax County.

== Community leader ==
William Payne was a vestryman with the Truro Parish from 1756 to 1765 and later the Fairfax Parish when the Truro Parish was split due to growth. He received more votes for one of the 12 vestryman positions in 1765 than Colonel George Washington. Eventually the boundary line between the Truro Parish and the Fairfax Parish had Payne and Washington as vestryman's in different parishes.

William Payne served as Sheriff of Fairfax County, Virginia from 1761 to 1763.

== Altercation with George Washington ==
William Payne famously knocked George Washington to the ground in a dispute of an election issue that almost led to a duel in 1755.

In the fall of 1755, Colonel George Washington's Regiment (i.e., the Virginia Rangers) was encamped at Fort Cumberland following the defeat 3–4 months earlier of General Edward Braddock’s expedition to the Ohio River Valley as part of the Seven Year’s War. Washington returned to Alexandria, Virginia, with several of his officers to support his friend George William Fairfax in his bid for a seat in the Virginia House of Burgesses.

William Payne supported the candidacy of William Ellzey, Fairfax’s opponent. In the public square, there was a dispute between Washington and Payne. Washington said something that was taken as an insult by Payne. Payne struck Washington with his walking stick knocking him to the ground. William Payne is described as being 5’6” and slender while Washington was 6’2” and described as “padded with well-developed muscles, indicating great strength“. Several of Washington's officers who were present drew their swords. Washington stopped them and the soldiers left the public square.

The next day, Washington wrote Payne a note to meet at the Tavern. William Payne expected to be challenged to a duel (a common means of resolving disputes between gentleman at that time) and to see two dueling pistols produced, instead there was a decanter of wine and two glasses on the table. Washington apologized and was alleged to have said “to err is nature; to rectify error is glory. I was wrong yesterday, but I wish to be right today.”

Washington and Payne became friends serving together as vestryman of the Truro Parish, as members of the Masonic Lodge of Alexandria, and as members of the Fairfax Committee on Public Safety.

William Payne had died by the time Washington himself passed away. However, William Payne's oldest son Colonel William Payne (1751–1813) was one of the pallbearers at Washington's funeral.

== Role in the American Revolution ==
William Payne was a signatory to the July 18, 1774 Fairfax Resolves document, believed to have been authored by George Mason, which was approved by a convention of Fairfax County freeholders chaired by George Washington. This set of resolutions rejected the British Parliament’s claim of supreme authority over the American colonies. One of the resolutions established the Fairfax County Committee of Safety to govern and defend the county. Payne was one of the 25 elected members which included his brother Edward Payne (died 1806), George Washington, and George Mason. Thirteen out of the 25 members had served together as vestrymen of Truro or Fairfax Parishes.

In his 50s with no military experience he did not serve directly in the Continental Army. He helped to raise funds to finance the Virginia Regiment.

His eldest son, William Payne (1751–1813), also known as Colonel William Payne, served in the military during the American Revolution. He began his service as a 1st lieutenant in the Marines and later was a captain in the 1st Virginia Regiment of the Continental Army. He was with the regiment at Valley Forge and was wounded during the war.
