= William Payne =

William Payne may refer to:

== Educators ==
- William K. Payne (1903–1963), American university president
- William Morton Payne (1858–1919), American educator and writer
- William Oscar Payne (1879–1944), professor of history at the University of Georgia
- William Payne (mathematician) (died 1779), English mathematician and author
- William H. Payne (1836–1907), American educator and translator

== Politicians ==
- William D. Payne (born 1932), American Democratic Party politician
- William Edward Payne (born 1933), Alberta MLA, 1979–1993
- William Ernest Payne (1878–1943), Alberta MLA, 1931–1935
- William Hector Payne (1914–1989), Canadian member of parliament, 1958–1962
- William Winter Payne (1807–1874), U.S. representative from Alabama
- William Payne (sheriff) (1725–1782), Fairfax County sheriff
- William Payne (New Mexico politician) (born 1951), Republican politician
- William C. Payne (c. 1841–1898), state legislator in Arkansas

== Sportspeople ==
- William Payne (cricketer) (1854–1909), English cricketer
- Bill Payne (athlete) (born 1967), retired American pole vaulter
- Billy Payne (William Porter Payne, born 1947), American former chairman of Augusta National Golf Club
- Billy Payne (footballer) (1881–1967), Australian rules footballer with Carlton
- Bill Payne (footballer, born 1883) (1883–1940), Australian rules footballer with Fitzroy

== Others ==
- William Payne (priest) (1650–1696), English controversialist
- William Payne (painter) (1760–1830), British painter
- William Payne (pantomimist) (1804–1878), actor and pantomimist and father of the Payne Brothers
- William H. F. Payne (1830–1904), general in the American Civil War
- Will Payne (television producer) (born 1974), television producer, writer and director
- Will Payne (actor) (born 1989), English actor
- Bill Payne (born 1949), musician, keyboardist and founder of the band Little Feat
- Bill Payne (oiler), co-founder of Helmerich & Payne

== See also ==
- Bill Payn (1893–1959), South African Springbok rugby player
- William Paine (disambiguation)
- William Payne-Gallwey (disambiguation)
