= Christ Church (Alexandria, Virginia) =

Historic church in Virginia, United States

- U.S. National Register of Historic Places
- U.S. National Historic Landmark
- Virginia Landmarks Register
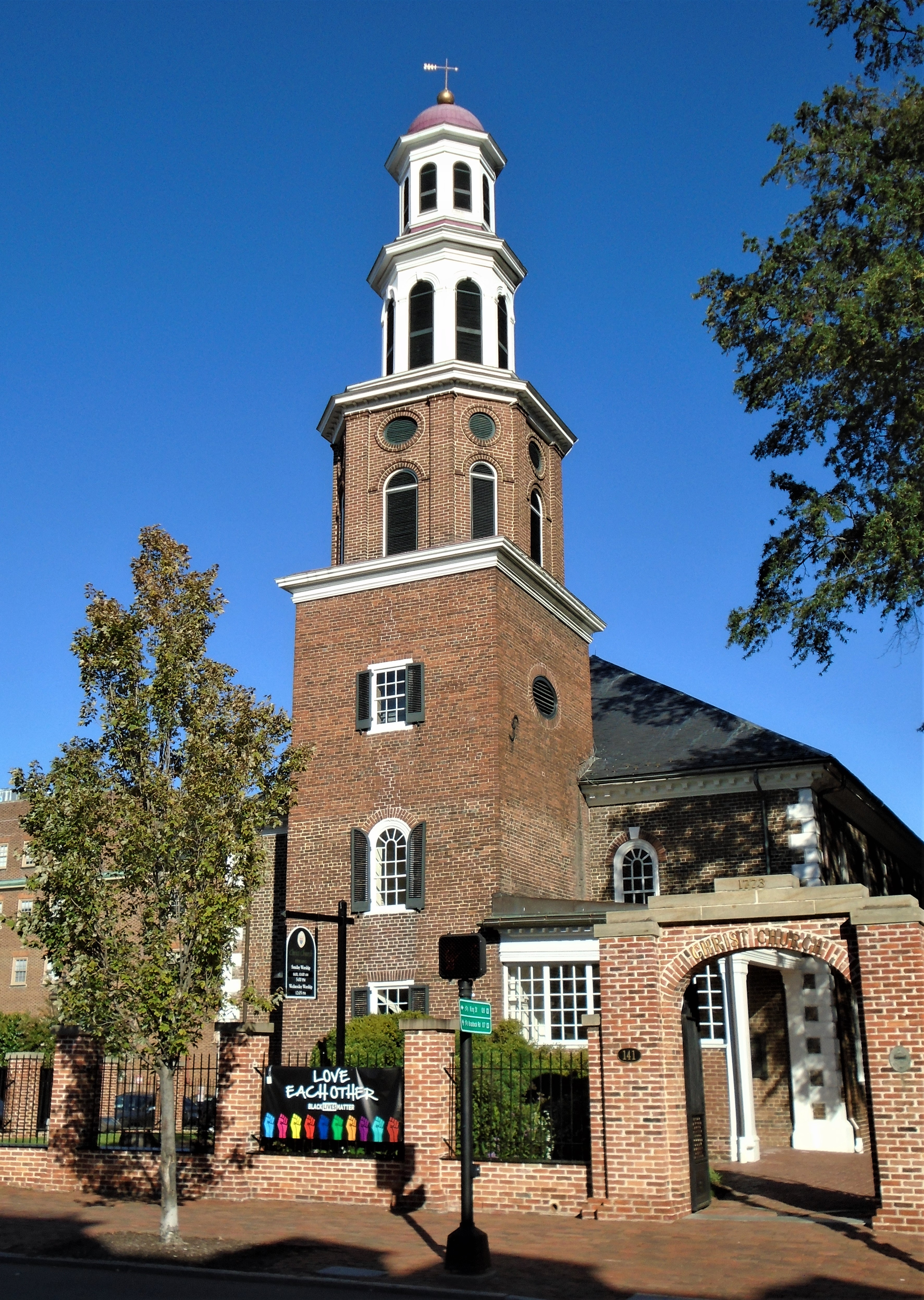
- North Columbus Street facade (2021)

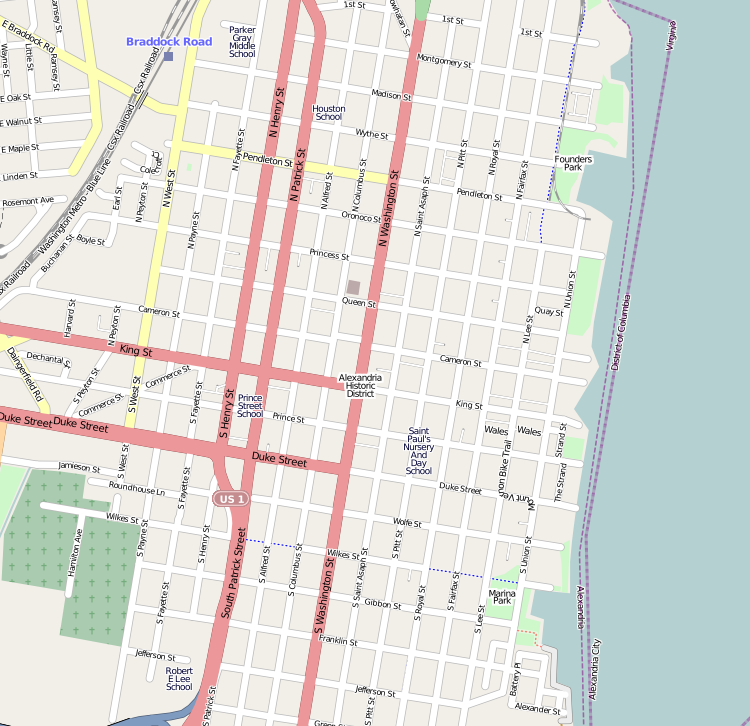
- Location within Alexandria Historical District Location within Alexandria Location within Northern Virginia Location within Virginia Location within the United States
- Location: 118 North Washington Street, Alexandria, Virginia
- Coordinates: 38°48′22.69″N 77°02′51.06″W
- Built: Completed February 27, 1773
- Architect: James Wren
- Architectural style: Georgian
- NRHP reference No.: 70000899
- VLR No.: 100-0012

Significant dates
- Added to NRHP: May 10, 1970
- Designated NHL: April 15, 1970
- Designated VLR: September 18, 1973

Christ Church is an Episcopal church located at 118 North Washington Street, with an entrance at 141 North Columbus Street, in Alexandria, Virginia. Constructed as the main church in the Church of England's Fairfax Parish, the building was designed by Col. James Wren, a descendant of Sir Christopher Wren.

George Washington, Henry Lee, Robert E. Lee, Charles Simms, Philip Marsteller, and Henry Fowler are a few of the church's notable parishioners (members). Until the twenty-first century, it was tradition for sitting presidents to attend a service. Franklin Roosevelt, Winston Churchill, and Eleanor Roosevelt visited the church on January 1, 1942 to commemorate World Day of Prayer for Peace. The church was known as Fairfax Church until given the name Christ Church in 1816. It was declared a National Historic Landmark in 1970.

== Description and history ==
Christ Church is located in Alexandria's Old Town, at the southwest corner of North Washington and Cameron Streets. The brick two-story church measures about 60 feet (18 m) by 50 feet (15 m). Comparable to Pohick Church in Truro Parish, which was gutted by Union troops, the church has stone quoins from nearby Aquia quarry. The roof is a simple hipped structure. The galleries, bell tower, and porch were added after the original construction, circa 1785 and 1815.

The Anglican congregation that commissioned the church's construction was founded in 1765, when Fairfax Parish was established. The vestry commissioned the construction of two churches, this one, and another at Falls Church. The architect of both buildings was by Colonel James Wren. To finance construction of the church in Alexandria, the vestry raised 31,186 pounds of Oronoco tobacco from parishioners. Construction began in 1765, under the direction of James Parsons. After four years, the church was still unfinished. The vestry relieved Parsons of his duties as overseer of the construction. John Carlyle accepted the position and handed the keys of the completed building over to the vestry in February 1773. During the Revolutionary War, the church was a center of pro-revolutionary activity, with its Rector, David Griffith, being particularly outspoken in favor of independence. After independence, the church survived the disestablishment of the Church of England as the state church of Virginia by the Commonwealth, in large part thanks to private support from parishioners including George Washington. The church is distinctive among Virginia's colonial churches in that its interior was spared the ravages of the Civil War. However, it was occupied by Union troops, and most of the tombstones were lost over the course of the war along with the church's silver. In the winter of 1869 – 1870, following the Civil War, Christ Church established Meade Memorial Chapel as a mission church in the north end of Alexandria.

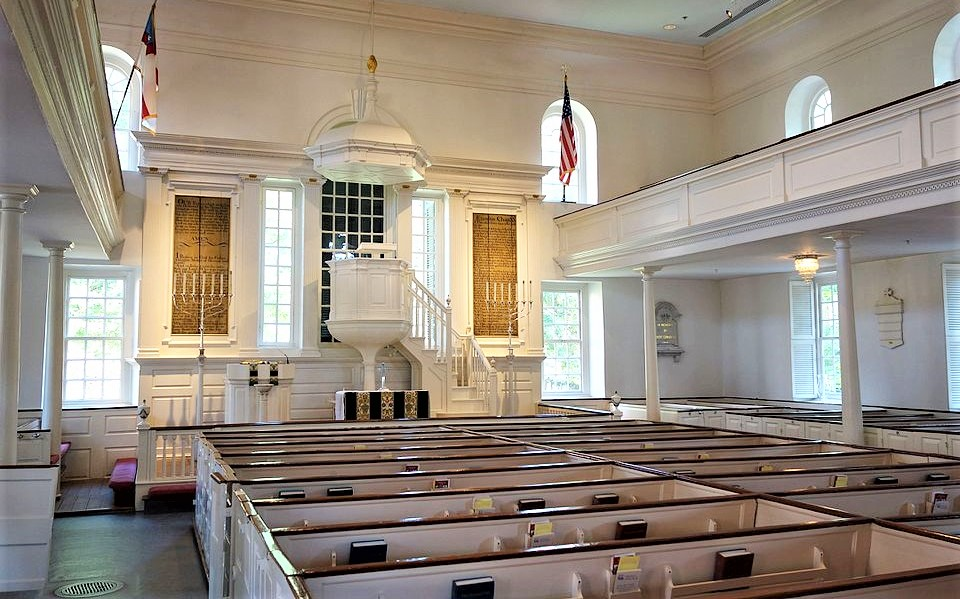
The interior of the church

Initially the pews were box pews and a two-tier pulpit was situated on the north side of the sanctuary. There was no font because until after the Civil War, weddings, baptisms, and the churching of women took place at home. In the mid-nineteenth century, stoves were put in the back of the church and the box pews were converted to the slips that are in use today. During a renovation later that century, the original pulpit was replaced by the current wine-glass pulpit. The only remaining hand-carved hymnal rack is in the Lee pew. The chancel is decorated on both sides with hand-lettered plaques displaying the Decalogue, the Lord's Prayer, the Apostles' Creed, and the Golden Rule. These plaques are original to the church, and painted by James Wren.

Among the burials in the churchyard is the mass grave of thirty-four Confederate prisoners of war who died in local hospitals during the Civil War. A memorial stone in the churchyard commemorates their deaths. Also buried in the church are Charles Simms and Philip Marstellar, two of George Washington's pallbearers; Anne Warren, a world-famous English actress; and former United States Secretary of the Treasury Henry H. Fowler, who was a parishoner.

In 2017 the congregation, vestry, and church leaders moved plaques in memory of Washington and Lee, each of which resided on either side of its sanctuary, to a more suitable public viewing space on the church grounds. Removal was decided based on a commitment to avoid "...a distraction in our worship space" and concern about creating "an obstacle to our identity as a welcoming church and an impediment to our growth and to full community with our neighbors."

== See also ==
- National Register of Historic Places listings in Alexandria, Virginia
- List of National Historic Landmarks in Virginia
