= William Paine =

William Paine may refer to:

- William Paine (physician) (1750–1833), Canadian physician and political figure
- William A. Paine (1855–1929), American businessman
- William W. Paine (1817–1882), U.S. Representative from Georgia

== See also ==
- William Pain (1855–1924), British Army officer
- William Payne (disambiguation)
