= Joseph Payne (cricketer) =

English cricketer

Personal information
- Full name: Joseph Spencer Payne
- Born: 29 April 1829; East Grinstead, Sussex, England
- Died: 12 April 1880 (aged 50); Greenwich, Kent, England
- Batting: Right-handed
- Bowling: Left-arm roundarm medium
- Relatives: Charles Payne (brother); Richard Payne (brother); William Payne (nephew); Alfred Payne (nephew)

Domestic team information
- Years: Team
- 1861: Sussex
- 1864: Kent

Career statistics
Competition	First-class
Matches	3
Runs scored	35
Batting average	7.00
100s/50s	0/0
Top score	32
Balls bowled	292
Wickets	13
Bowling average	11.53
5 wickets in innings	1
10 wickets in match	0
Best bowling	8/73
Catches/stumpings	3/0
- Source: CricInfo, 5 October 2012

Joseph Spencer Payne (29 April 1829 – 12 April 1880) was an English cricketer. Payne was a right-handed batsman who bowled left-arm roundarm medium pace.

Payne was born at East Grinstead in Sussex in 1829. He made his first-class cricket debut for Sussex County Cricket Club against Marylebone Cricket Club (MCC) at Lord's in 1861. He made a second first-class appearance for Sussex in the same season against Kent and went on to play once for Kent against Yorkshire in 1864.

Payne died at Greenwich in Kent in April 1880 aged 50. His brothers, Charles and Richard, played first-class cricket, as did his nephews William Payne and Alfred Payne.

== Bibliography ==
- Carlaw, Derek (2020). Kent County Cricketers, A to Z: Part One (1806–1914) (PDF). Cardiff: ACS.
