= Pohick Church =

Historic church in Virginia, US

- Pohick Episcopal Church
- U.S. National Register of Historic Places
- Virginia Landmarks Register
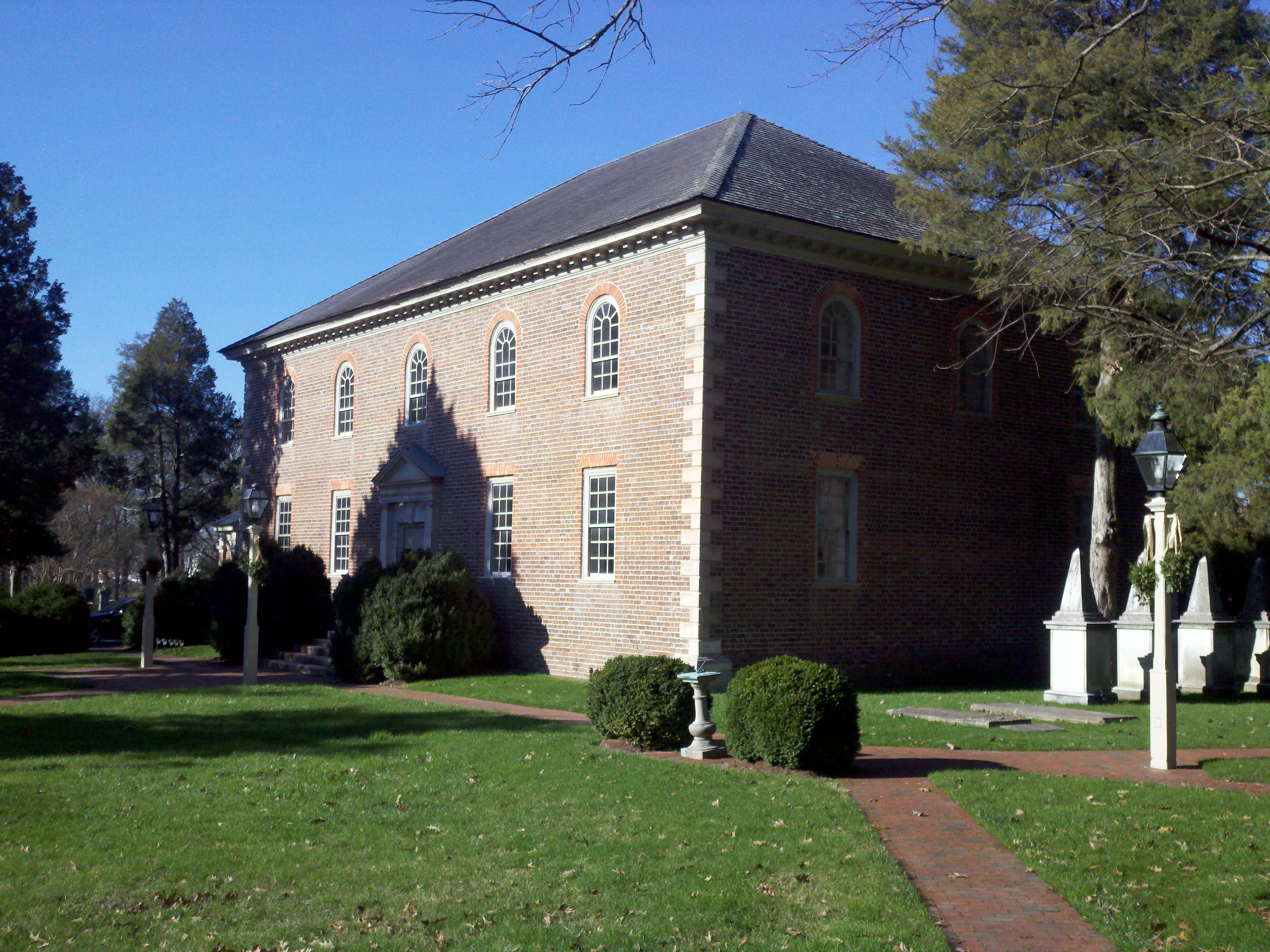
- Pohick Church, seen in September 2012

- Location within Northern Virginia Location within Virginia Location within the United States
- Location: 9301 Richmond Hwy., Lorton, Virginia
- Coordinates: 38°42′28″N 77°11′39″W
- Built: 1774
- Architect: James Wren
- Architectural style: Colonial
- NRHP reference No.: 69000239
- VLR No.: 029-0046

Significant dates
- Added to NRHP: October 16, 1969
- Designated VLR: November 5, 1968

Pohick Church, previously known as Pohick Episcopal Church, is an Episcopal church in the community of Lorton in Fairfax County, Virginia, United States. Often called the "Mother Church of Northern Virginia," the church is notable for its association with important figures in early Virginian history such as George Washington and George Mason, both of whom served on its vestry.

The present structure was completed in 1774 and underwent significant renovations beginning in 1874 and 1890. It is two stories tall with a hipped roof and modillioned cornice, with an interior of early Colonial Revival design. The church building was added to the Virginia Landmarks Register in 1968 and National Register of Historic Places in 1969.

The church's archive includes the original vestry book of Truro Parish, dating to 1732; a 1761 prayer book imported by Washington; and the grave marker of Katherine Popkins, dated 1766, which is the lone surviving stone from the graveyard of the congregation's former location in Colchester. Charles Mason Remey had contracted a family mausoleum on the grounds in 1937, but "the Remeum" became the target of vandalism and was demolished beginning in 1973.

== History ==
=== Early colonial period: first churches ===
The origins of Pohick Church can be traced to a chapel of ease for Overwharton Parish, which appears to have been built around 1695 in the Woodlawn area of today's community of Mount Vernon. This church, the first in the parish and thus the first in Northern Virginia, was recorded in a 1715 land grant as being along the Potomac Path, the "county main road," which today is U.S. Route 1. In 1730 the parish relocated the church south, building a frame structure, the so-called "church above Occoquan Ferry" near what later became the community of Colchester. The site of this church is today occupied by Cranford United Methodist Church; there, a stone in the churchyard marks the original site of Pohick Church, and a walkway of oversized brick on the property is thought to date from the period of the original building. No other trace of the original structure or its site exists; the last remnant was the cemetery, whose location is known but which was empty of grave markers by 1938.

By 1730, the population of the parish had grown substantially, and it was decided by the Virginia General Assembly to create a new parish, Hamilton, out of Overwharton to better serve the needs of the people. The church at Occoquan became the parish church of this new parish. In 1732 another split was made, and Truro Parish was formed; the church, now renamed "Pohick Church" in honor of its position along Pohick Creek, became the parish church for this new parish as well, being the only church then in the neighborhood. The first person to preach there was the Reverend Lawrence DeButts, who in 1733 was contracted to preach at various points around the parish three times a month for a year, for the sum of eight thousand pounds of tobacco.

Dr. Charles Green was the first rector of Pohick Church; he was successfully sponsored by Augustine Washington, father of George, who was elected to the church vestry in 1735. Green was confirmed to the post in 1736 and traveled to London for ordination, returning to take up his duties the following year. During his tenure as rector Green was involved in a major scandal when he was accused by Lawrence Washington of sexual misconduct with his wife Anne. Washington demanded Green's ouster from his post at the church; Green refused, and brought countersuit against Washington for slander, whereupon the latter demanded an ecclesiastical trial. This took place in the chapel of the College of William and Mary in Williamsburg beginning on November 6, 1745; before a verdict was reached, however, Governor William Gooch stepped in and ordered Green to drop the suit, in exchange for which he would not be removed from his post. In the end, the rector remained at Pohick for the next twenty years as a respected clergyman; at his death in 1765 George Washington served as his executor. He was replaced as rector by Lee Massey, a former lawyer who was ordained in 1766 and took up his post the following year. Massey's duties frequently took him to other churches in the parish, and as a result Pohick Church was not open for services every Sunday of the year.

George Mason began his long association with the church in February 1749–50, when he was named warden to replace the deceased Jeremiah Bronaugh; he would go on to serve the congregation as a vestryman until the dissolution of vestries after the American Revolutionary War. Also elected to the post of warden, on October 25, 1762, was George Washington. He, too, would go on to serve as vestryman, attending frequent meetings at the church despite its distance from his home at Mount Vernon; he also remained otherwise quite active in the parish, and is said to have often persuaded house guests to attend services with him. In October 1763, Washington and George William Fairfax were appointed churchwardens for the following year.

=== Construction of the present church ===
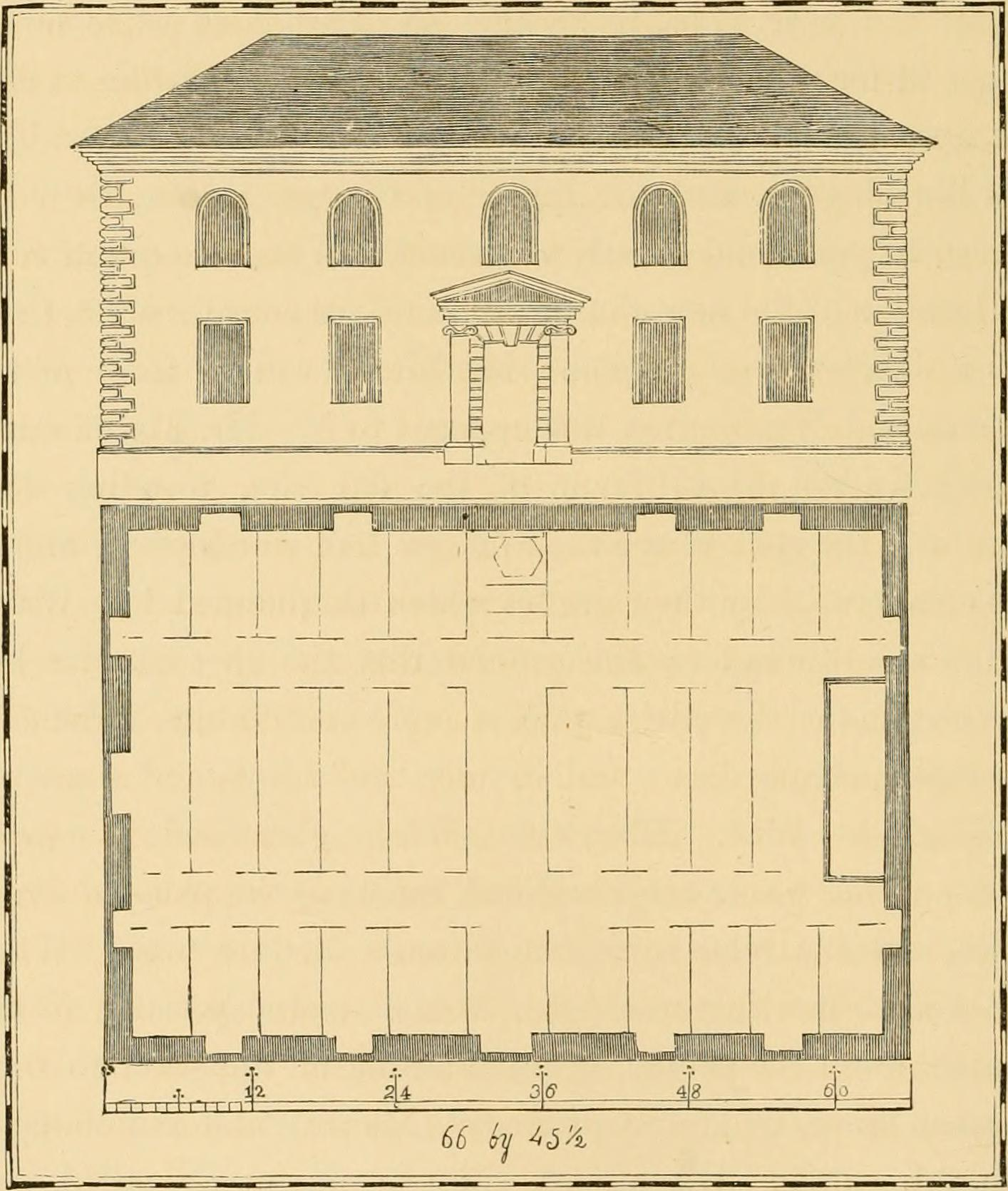
The floor plan of the church as depicted by Benson Lossing in 1859, copied from a now-unlocated original source.

By 1767, the Pohick vestry determined that the now-dilapidated frame structure serving the parish should be replaced. George Washington argued the need for finding a new location, believing that the new building should be more centrally located, at the intersection of the Potomac Path and the back road – today's Telegraph Road – for the convenience of members of the congregation. George Mason, for his part, argued that the new structure should be built at the site of the old church, as the cemetery contained the graves of many family members; Washington is supposed to have responded by surveying the new location, showing that it was more convenient to most members of the parish, and presenting the results to a meeting of the vestry, whereupon Mason's objection was dropped, although he is reported to have stalked out of the meeting, exclaiming, "That's what gentlemen get for engaging in a debate with a damned surveyor!" The final vote was seven to five in favor of moving the site of the church. The new location was settled on, and a building committee was impaneled; its members were Washington, Mason, George William Fairfax, Daniel McCarty, and Edward Payne. Recalling the Biblical image of a "city upon a hill", the highest point of land in the vicinity was chosen as the site of the new church.

Twenty percent of the building's cost was raised at a 1772 auction of pews in which many local landowners participated; the remainder came from tithes and other contributions, including three annual levies on the tobacco crop. The churchyard was laid out at a meeting of the vestry, held on the future site of the church, in 1769; three acres and twenty-six perches of land were purchased, at the rate of a guinea an acre, and the deed was made by Daniel French of Rose Hill, also the first contractor of the building. French was to be paid £877 for his work, in Virginia currency.

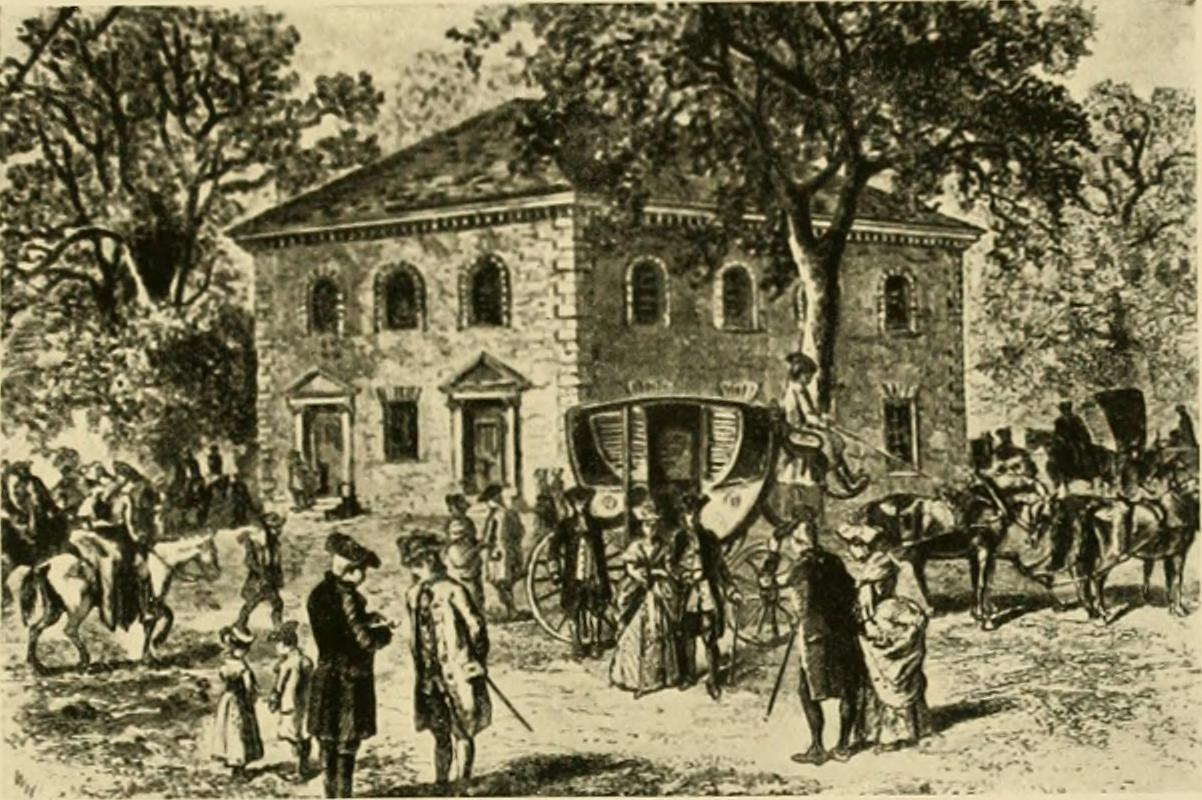
This image, published in 1915, depicts Pohick Church and its congregation as it would have been seen in the late eighteenth century.

The original plan for Pohick Church was drawn up by James Wren, and was identical to that used for both The Falls Church and Christ Church in Alexandria, Virginia; however, at some point during the construction process the footprint of the church was altered to that seen today. Some sources have claimed that George Washington himself drew up the design for the building, and at least one hints that George Mason, too, might have provided input; however, records show that in March 1769 the vestry paid James Wren and William West for the church plans. Construction was initially overseen by the planter Daniel French of Rose Hill, a member of the congregation. He died before completion of the building works, and oversight passed to William Buckland, who was also involved in the building of Gunston Hall nearby, and who may have participated in the decoration of the church interior as well; it is possible that Buckland took over the work at the instigation of his employer, George Mason, who had assumed many of French's debts and obligations at the latter's death. Much of the original woodwork in the building was executed by master carver William Bernard Sears, a longtime associate of Buckland's who was also attached to Gunston Hall, likely in indenture to Mason, and is known to have worked at Mount Vernon as well. The account presented by him for his services survives, and indicates that he was paid £58:19:0 for his craft. Plans for the church complex also called for the installation of mounting blocks and six benches in the churchyard, so that people could sit under the trees, and for the area to be cleared of all rubbish and litter. Washington's records indicate that he took an interest in furnishing the new church; besides paying William Copan for carving ciphers on both his pew and that of his neighbor Fairfax, he fitted his own pew with drawers, and also paid for a latch and a door for the church building.

An early plan describing the initial disposition and ownership of pews in the building was copied by Benson Lossing and republished by him in 1859; the original is currently unlocated. A 1774 entry in the church vestry book assigns an unusual order to four of the pews, stating: "Ordered that the Upper Pew in the new Church adjoining the South Wall be appropriated to the Use of the Magistrates and Strangers, and the Pew opposite thereto to the use of their Wives, and the two Pews next below them be appropriated to the Vestrymen and Merchants and their Wives, in like manner." The two most notable pewholders were George Mason and George Washington; other pews were kept by William Triplett, George William Fairfax, Alexander Henderson, Lund Washington (cousin of George), John Manley, Martin Cockburn, and Daniel McCarty. The eight pews located in the west end of the church were set aside for "Inhabitants and House Keepers of the Parish".

Construction of the church building was completed in 1774, just before the start of the American Revolutionary War. Early discussions of the Fairfax Resolves took place at the site in that year; among those in attendance at the meetings were George Washington and George Mason, and Rector Massey was among the signatories at their adoption. William Grayson is said to have been a member of the congregation in these years as well, and he is recorded as having served as an attorney for Truro Parish on numerous occasions.

=== Early Federal period ===
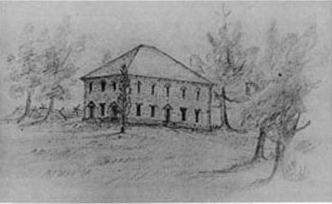
Sketch of the church dating to c. 1830, drawn by one of the children of George Mason

With the Religious Freedom Act of 1785, the Virginia General Assembly formally disestablished the Church of England. Many former Anglican turned Episcopal churches, fell into decline, including Pohick Church. It remained active; Mason Weems, better known as a biographer of George Washington, preached at the church off and on from around 1798 until at least 1817, and styled himself as the "formerly rector" of the congregation, though this was likely an exaggeration. Another fixture at the church was Reverend Charles O'Neill, remembered chiefly for having been presented with a used suit of Washington's clothes, which he would wear while preaching, although it did not fit him well; he was held to be quite popular among local families.

Little else is known of the history of the structure from 1777 to 1836, although the vestry book records that George Washington resigned from the vestry in 1782, and that Rector Massey ceased his regular duties shortly thereafter due to ill health. Furthermore, Washington is known to have stopped attending regular services at Pohick by this time, having instead shifted his attention to Christ Church in Alexandria as his preferred house of worship; even so, he kept up payments on his pew at the church, and purchased that of his cousin Lund as well. In 1801 John Davis wrote a surviving account of a service at Pohick Church; it indicates that at the time of his visit approximately half the congregation was white and half black. Davis also attended a number of services preached by Weems, and found them well-attended.

Oral tradition indicates that Pohick Church was targeted by the British during the War of 1812 for its association with George Washington. One of the parishioners had carved a wooden dove, gilded it, and placed it on Washington's former pew, although some accounts state instead that it was affixed to the pulpit. According to the story, the sculpture was decapitated by a British soldier who also removed its wings, and was then thrown into the church courtyard, whence it was later retrieved. It was returned to the family of the sculptor, a Mr. Bowie, and passed down among his descendants before being returned to the congregation in 1988. It is on display in the parish house of the church. Otherwise, it is recorded that the interior of the building remained largely intact until the time of the American Civil War.

William Meade, later to become Episcopal Bishop of Virginia, visited the church in the summer of 1837, and described what he had seen in an address made the following year:

My next visit was to Pohick Church, in the vicinity of Mt. Vernon, the seat of General Washington. It was still raining when I approached the house, and found no one there. The wide open doors invited me to enter, as they do invite, day and night through the year, not only the passing traveller, but every beast of the field and fowl of the air. These latter however seemed to have reverenced the house of God, since few marks of their pollution were to be seen throughout it. The interior of the house, having been well built, is still good. The chancel, Communion table and tables of the law &c. are still there and in good order. The roof only is decaying; and at the time I was there the rain was dropping on these sacred places and on other parts of the house. On the doors of the pews, in gilt letters, are still to be seen the names of the principal Families which once occupied them. How could I, while for at least an hour traversing those long aisles, ascending the lofty pulpit, entering the sacred chancel, forbear to ask, And is this the House of God which was built by the Washingtons, the Mc.Cartys, the Lewises, the Fairfaxes?—the house in which they used to worship the God of our fathers according to the venerable forms of the Episcopal Church, and some of whose names are still to be seen on the doors of those now deserted pews? Is this also destined to moulder piecemeal away, or, when some signal is given, to become the prey of spoilers, and to be carried hither and thither and applied to every purpose under heaven?

On the strength of this appeal, the Reverend W. P. C. Johnson, then serving as a tutor at Gunston Hall, became the first post-Colonial rector to serve the church. Within a few years, Johnson, whose wife was a daughter of Bushrod Washington, was able to raise fifteen hundred dollars for repairs, largely on the strength of the Bishop's account; Meade further noted, however, that the doors belonging to the Washington and Mason pews were gone, although most of the others remained. Among those who provided funds to fix the leaking roof were John Quincy Adams, Martin van Buren, Daniel Webster, Francis Scott Key, and Henry Clay. The church continued serving an active Episcopal parish, being staffed sporadically by students from the Virginia Theological Seminary after Johnson's 1840 departure; in addition, a Methodist congregation held services in the building for some years in the 1850s, and a debating society used it for meetings for a time.

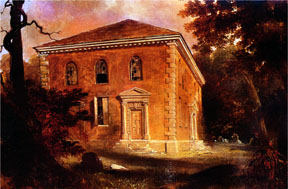
1835 painting of the church by John Gadsby Chapman

Benson Lossing attended a Methodist service at Pohick Church on December 10, 1848, and recorded the event in his widely-read Pictorial Field Book of the Revolution; he stated in his account that during the service he sat in the Washington family pew. He also noted the presence of a number of broken windows in the building. Furthermore, he recorded that the pulpit appeared to have been the target of vandals, and that birds had built nests around it and otherwise used it as a perch. The account also states that the altarpiece was still extant at this time. Lossing counted twenty-one members of the congregation, white and black combined, on this occasion. Also included in the book is a description of the site of the church; at the time of the writer's visit, it stood on the edge of a primeval forest composed largely of oaks, pines, and chestnuts, which extended "almost uninterruptedly" to Mount Vernon.

The earliest known detailed picture of the church building dates to this period in its history; it was painted by John Gadsby Chapman, and shows the dilapidated state to which the structure had been reduced. Dating to 1835, it is believed to have been painted to raise money for the restoration fund, although this is uncertain. The painting is in the church collection, but has been loaned to Mount Vernon for display.

=== American Civil War ===
By 1860, conditions at Pohick Church had deteriorated to such a state that it is unclear whether or not the building remained a consecrated house of worship at the dawn of the American Civil War. With its proximity to Washington, D.C., the building was quickly embroiled in the fighting that rocked Northern Virginia, although in that year a plan was formed by a clergyman from Fairfax, Reverend R. T. Brown, to return the building to active service, a plan which was quashed by the beginning of the conflict. The 2nd Michigan Volunteers, under the command of General Samuel P. Heintzelman, raided the church on November 12, 1861. Lieutenant Charles B. Haydon was outraged at the men's behavior, describing it thus:

At 8½ A.M. we reached the church 12 miles out. Pohick Church is a brick building built in 1773. Gen. Washington contributed to building it & was a frequent attendant. It has a very ancient look & one would suppose that it might be sacred enough to be secure. I have long known that the Mich 2nd had no fear or reverence as a general thing for God or the places where he is worshiped but I had hoped that the memory of Gen. Washington might protect almost anything with which it was associated. I believe our soldiers would have torn the church down in 2 days. They were all over it in less than 10 minutes tearing off the ornaments, splitting the woodwork and pews, knocking the brick to pieces & everything else they could get at. They wanted pieces to carry away ... A more absolute set of vandals than our men can not be found on the face of the earth. As true as I am living I believe they would steal Washington's coffin if they could get to it.

Private Robert Sneden visited the church in January 1862. He painted a watercolor of the encampments around the building and described its condition in his journal:

We reached Pohick Church about 4 pm in a snow storm ... It was a substantial two story brick structure with white marble, quoins and trimmings and old colonial gambrel roof ... Here Washington attended service, with all the old first families of the time ... He drove from Mount Vernon to church in his coach with four horses, tandem fashion as did the others. Now the church was in ruinous condition. Windows were all broken out, doors gone, pews nearly gone, being used for firewood by our pickets. The ceilings broken by the rain coming through the roof, walls discolored black by smoke, etc. The mahogany pulpit was half cut away and carried off for relics, while the cornerstones had been unearthed and the contents carried off. Washington had lain this stone in 1765 [sic] and the soldiers who got it out must have found valuable relics. There was not much left for the relic hunters now even the sconces and door knobs and hinges were gone.

Confederate General J. Johnston Pettigrew also recorded visiting Pohick Church in his wartime journal.

Thaddeus S. C. Lowe soon took over the church as a base of operations, and a garrison stationed at the site began to use the building as quarters. The men left graffiti behind on the church doorposts, quoins, and walls; much of it is still visible today, as are bullet holes in the exterior walls. From this location Lowe repeatedly launched his balloon, Intrepid, to track Confederate troop movements along the Occoquan River, and here he saw the earliest successes of his short-lived Federal Balloon Corps. The church was used as a stable by Union forces during the winter of 1862–63, during which time the interior was stripped of everything save the upper cornice. Some of this damage was documented by Mathew Brady in a photograph taken in 1862.

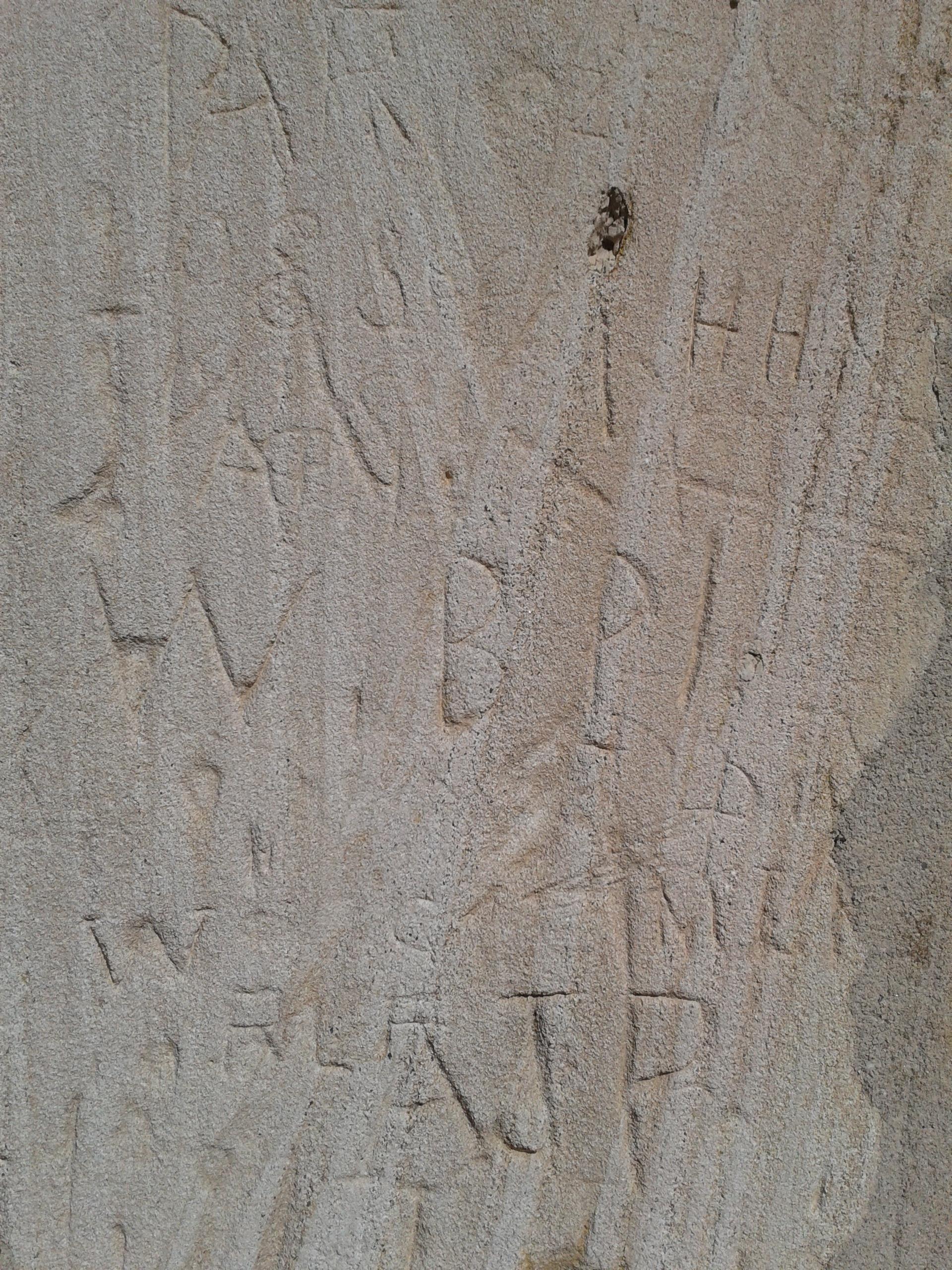
Civil War graffiti, still visible on the exterior walls of the church

Skirmishes are known to have taken place in the vicinity of the church throughout the war; the area was officially neutral ground, but was populated by guerrillas attempting to disrupt local military operations. Jacob Erwin of Company C of the 1st New York Cavalry, killed in one such action, is believed to have been the first volunteer cavalryman of the Army of the Potomac to have been killed during the conflict.

Robert E. Lee is recorded as having been a member of the congregation at some time during this period of its history.

=== Post-Civil War ===
The congregation of Pohick Church had scattered thoroughly by the end of the war, so that for a time the building stood empty and unused. In 1874 the structure began to see a return to its original purpose once again. Renovations, paid for by a donor from New York City, were undertaken beginning in that year to make it suitable for use, but no attempt was made to restore the church to its colonial splendor. The box pews were replaced by straight benches, and other architectural elements were added which bore traces of the Victorian Gothic style. A large platform was installed at the eastern end of the building, and on this a vestry room was partitioned off and constructed at the north end. Many of the furnishings were donated by a congregation from New York. A service of reconsecration, led by the Episcopal Bishop of Virginia, John Johns, was conducted on the first Sunday of October 1875. After this the congregation was once again served by students from the Virginia Theological Seminary until a permanent rector was appointed in 1881. A rectory was purchased for the church in 1883, and by 1908 the church property consisted of forty-three acres of land as well as the rectory and parish hall. Pohick Church on occasion played host to dignitaries; in 1878 President Rutherford B. Hayes and his wife Lucy attended a service there after having spent the night at Mount Vernon.

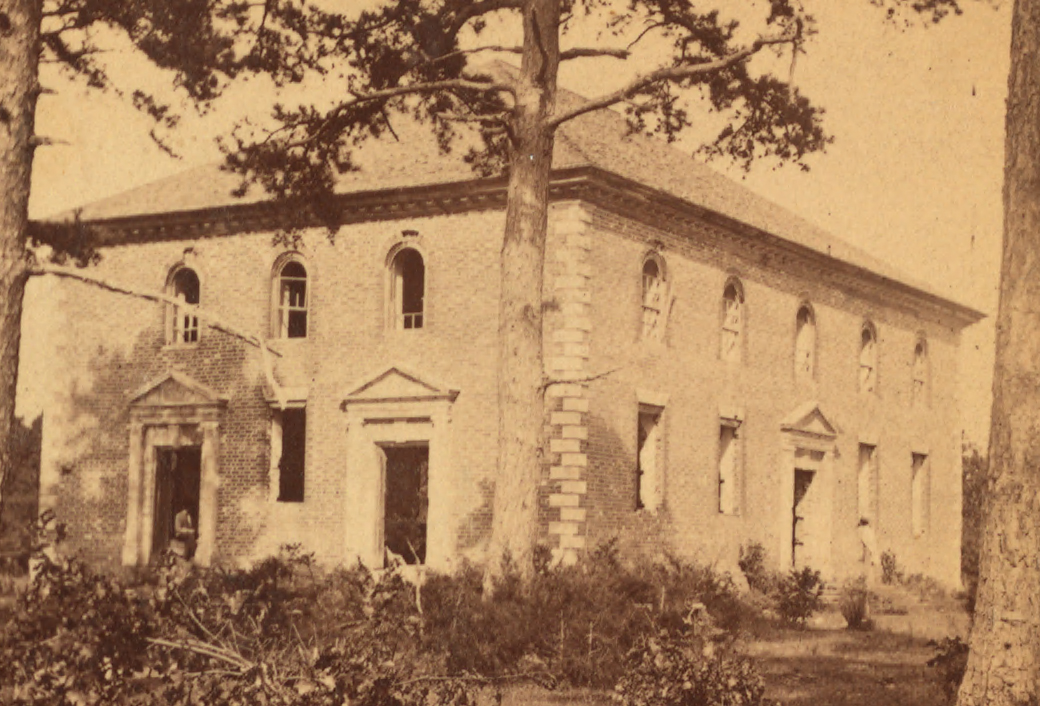
This image, cropped from a stereoscopic photograph taken sometime after the Civil War, shows the state to which Pohick Church had been reduced. Note the missing windows and doors.

In 1894, the original vestry book of Pohick Church was recovered by Reverend Philip Slaughter, an event which appears to have inspired new interest in the history of the parish. Contributing to the new attitude was the publication of two books, The Life and Correspondence of George Mason by Kate Mason Rowland in 1891 and Dr. Slaughter's own The History of Truro Parish in Virginia in 1908. These works, coupled with the efforts during the nineteenth century of Reverend Samuel Wallis, introduced parishioners, previously cognizant only of George Washington's connection with the church, to the roles played by the McCarty family, George Mason, Jeremiah Bronaugh, and Lee Massey, among others, in its history.

Not long after the structure reopened for worship, the Mount Vernon Ladies' Association, at the instigation of a member of the vestry, began to take an interest in its workings. The association took a pew in the church, and members sometimes attended services there. Another major restoration effort resulted from this interest. This one, designed to replicate the colonial fabric of the church as best could be managed, began in 1890 and continued until 1917. These repairs were spearheaded by the Ladies' Association and the Daughters of the American Revolution. They were overseen by architect Glenn Brown, and much of the woodwork currently visible in the church is his handiwork. Contributions to the repair fund came from around the country, and descendants of the original pewholders were contacted to restore their respective families' pews. Phoebe Hearst provided the money to construct a temporary space for worship to continue while the original church was being refitted; this white frame structure soon became known as "Hearst Hall" in her honor, and went on to serve as a parish hall for the community. Additional support for the project was provided by Harrison Howell Dodge, a member of the vestry who served as superintendent of Mount Vernon for many years. The restoration also saw the replacement of the pulpit with one patterned along colonial lines. In 1912 a pew in the church was dedicated to Ann Pamela Cunningham, first regent of the Ladies' Association, for her work in preserving both Mount Vernon and the church, a dedication which no longer exists.

In 1916, an endowment was in the process of being raised to provide support for the congregation, which was described by numerous sources as being poor and lacking the money necessary to support repairs to the building; at this time the rector was Reverend Everard Meade, a grandson of the bishop whose account had earlier made the church's plight known. Some original pieces of the interior fittings have been returned to the church as part of the restoration works; a piece of the balustrade surrounding the communion rail was sent back by the taker or a member of his family, as was a fragment of the Washington pew; the latter, returned in 1986, provided an indication of the original color of the woodwork, and provided a match to be used in the refitting of the interior. The church continues to be home to an active congregation, members of which give tours of the structure after Sunday services and at sporadic other times; the building is also open for self-guided tours daily. A chapter of the Brotherhood of St. Andrew has existed at the church for many years, and is today one of the largest and most active in the country.

=== Documentation and recognition ===
Pohick Church was photographed by Frances Benjamin Johnston in 1930 as part of the Carnegie Survey of the Architecture of the South; it was documented by the Historic American Buildings Survey in 1941. A historical marker was erected by the state of Virginia commemorating the history of the structure in 1934, and can still be seen today, located just outside the church property itself. Next to it is a sign placed by the Civil War Trails Program in 2014 and detailing the Civil War-era history of the church and grounds. Also at the site is a marker detailing the history of the old telegraph line, one of the first in the world, which ran nearby and which is today memorialized in the name of Telegraph Road. The church is the centerpiece of a historic overlay district established by Fairfax County in 1970; it was the first such district designated by the county. It was added to the Virginia Landmarks Register in 1968 and to the National Register of Historic Places the following year. Restoration and maintenance of the church property are currently overseen by the Historic Pohick Church Foundation, formally known as the Pohick Church Endowment Fund Inc., a nonprofit organization established in 1983.

== Architecture ==
=== Exterior ===
Pohick Church is a two-story tall rectangular building with a hipped roof and modillioned cornice. There is a roof overhang of about three feet. Its dimensions at the time of construction were fixed at sixty-six feet in length and forty-five-and-a-half feet in breadth; the specification indicated that the walls were to be twenty-eight feet tall. The construction material, Flemish bond described initially as "good Bricks well burnt", was baked at or near the site of the church. The water table is considered to be of note, as it combines concave and convex styles. White freestone was used for various fittings on the building, and the window arches are of rubbed brick. The windows of the first floor have flat lintels, those on the second story have arches. The exterior stonework has been described as "especially fine"; the rusticated surround of each of the western entries is framed by Ionic pilasters and topped with a pedimented frieze. The main entrance, at the south, is similar in construction, but with a triple keystone instead of the single one used over other doors. Also notable are the quoins at the corners of the building. The doors are trimmed with Aquia Creek sandstone, using designs common to English architectural books of the period. More specifically, they have been traced to the publications of James Gibbs, and were likely executed by stonemason William Copein. The exterior has been restored on multiple occasions, and much of the building's external fabric has been renewed. The complex is surrounded by a low brick wall, donated in 1917 by a group of prominent citizens from New York. Such a wall had been part of the original design when the church was completed, but was ultimately rejected by the vestry as being too expensive; it was replaced with a wooden post fence. Stylistically, the church has been described as belonging to the Late Georgian school of architecture, with Palladian tendencies; one source has called it "a sophisticated essay in the Georgian style", and states that it "recalls the more refined dissenter chapels of 18th-century England".

=== Interior ===
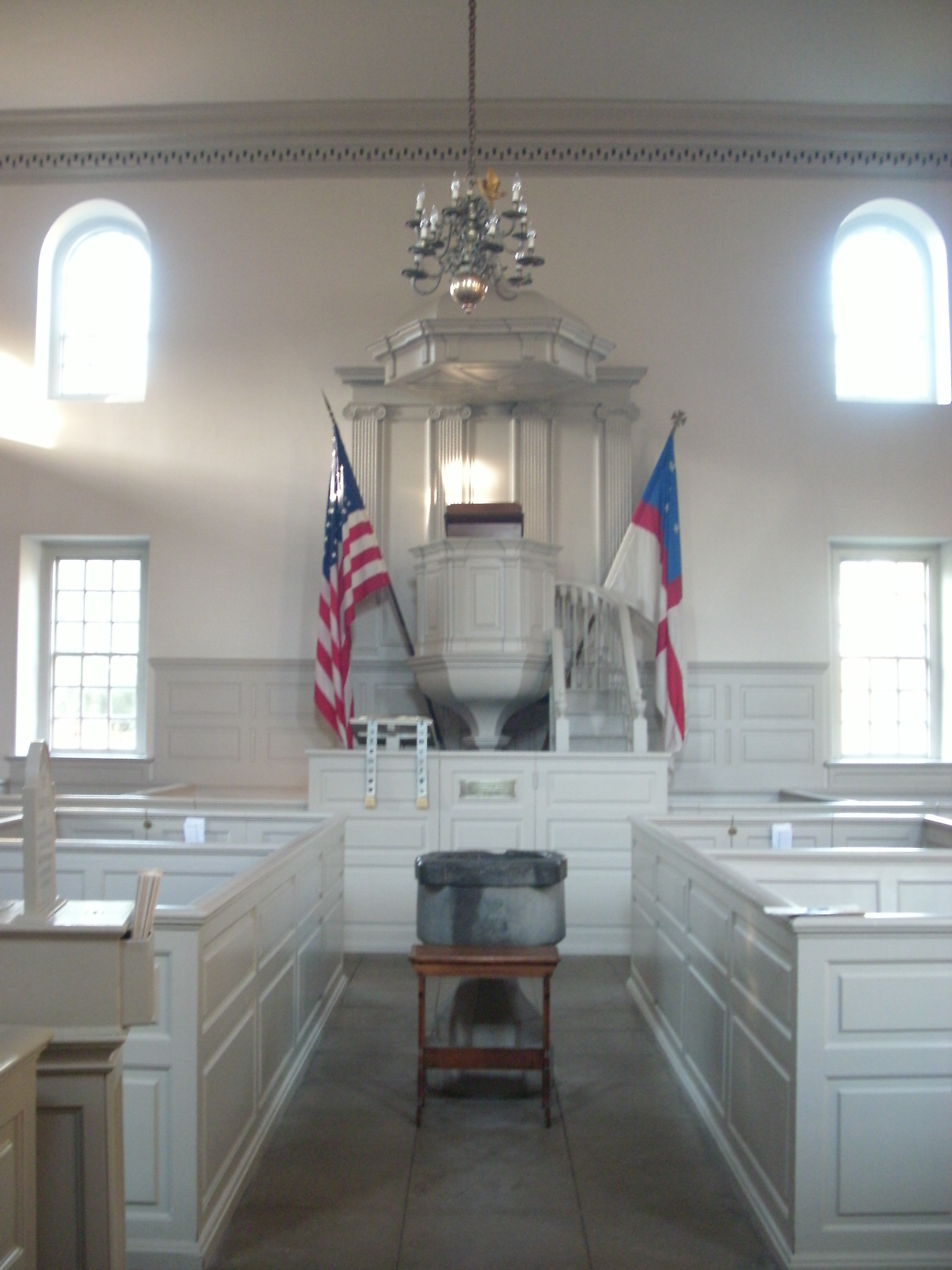
Interior of the church, showing the pulpit and central aisle; in the center is the old baptismal font.

The church interior, described by one writer as "probably the most sophisticated interior of its time in the colonies", contains two aisles, with a separate entry door for each one. The box pews conform to the traditional English arrangement. Markers have been affixed to many pews in memory of past members of the church community. As nearly the whole of the original interior woodwork was destroyed during the Civil War, what exists today is an example of early Colonial Revival design dating to the restorations of the early twentieth century.

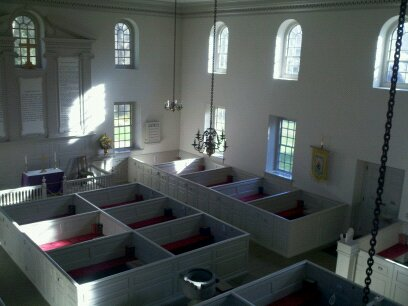
A view of the box pews from above

The altarpiece, twenty feet high and fifteen wide, is in wainscot, with Ionic decorations. As per Anglican requirements, it displays the Apostles' Creed, the Lord's Prayer, and the Ten Commandments. In the pediment window is a cross, 42 inches high, carved of walnut from Mount Vernon and faced with gold leaf. The church is provided with a modern tracker organ, completed by Fritz Noack in 1969 to a design by Charles Fisk, with carvings executed by Roger Martin. This instrument contains 880 pipes, with thirteen stops and seventeen ranks. The pulpit, also Ionic in its fittings, is carved of pine, as are its canopy and the reading desks; the gold leaf used to execute portions of its decoration was donated by George Washington. Its base is formed in the wineglass style. Below the pew box under the pulpit is the grave of the Reverend Lee Massey, last colonial rector of Truro Parish; his remains were removed to the church in 1908 from the former site of his house, Bradley, the first in a series of reinterments of early parishioners in the church and churchyard. The entirety of the church interior is painted a putty color, which serves to unify the various architectural elements within, as does the clarity of the design of the space as a whole.

Two baptismal fonts remain in the church. The newer of the two was carved by William Copein from a design in a book by Batty Langley; its base was destroyed during the American Civil War and it was removed from the church for some time, although it was later returned. The older has been dated to the eleventh or twelfth century, and appears to have once been a mortar from a monastery refectory; many such pieces were shipped to the American colonies for liturgical use, and the font is associated with an earlier church occupied by the congregation. It was restored in 1890 and continues to be in use for baptisms. The chandeliers lighting the building are French, and were given as a memorial to members of the congregation who served in the European theater of World War II. Also inside the church is a memorial, dedicated by President Warren Harding on May 29, 1921, to six men of the Mount Vernon and Lee Districts who had been killed in World War I. Another memorial was raised to the novelist Vaughan Kester, who died at Gunston Hall, by his mother.

A description of the interior prior to its restoration survives in an oral history of the church:

The Church had been practically abandoned for some years and was in a bad state of delapidation, but the beautiful carved work that had been done by William Bernard Sears, soon after the church was built, had not then been molested. My mother used to sit in the church and read the Lord's Prayer and Ten Commandments over the Chancel, and admire the gilded dove that Mr. Sears had placed high over the Pulpit. The 'Eye' which he also had made seemed to be looking at her no matter where she sat.

Little remains of the original interior fabric of the church, save for the cornice and one baluster on the chancel rail. Much of the rest is a conjectural reconstruction dating to the early years of the twentieth century. Notably, despite the presence of the second tier of windows, there was no gallery inside during the colonial era; the current gallery was installed early in the twentieth century. Further restoration of the interior is in progress. Contemporary fittings inside the church include needlework cushions in a number of pews, worked by women of the parish and friends of the congregation and depicting symbols and scenes of historic significance both to Pohick Church and the surrounding area; the Episcopal Church as a whole; and the state of Virginia.

=== Ancillary buildings ===
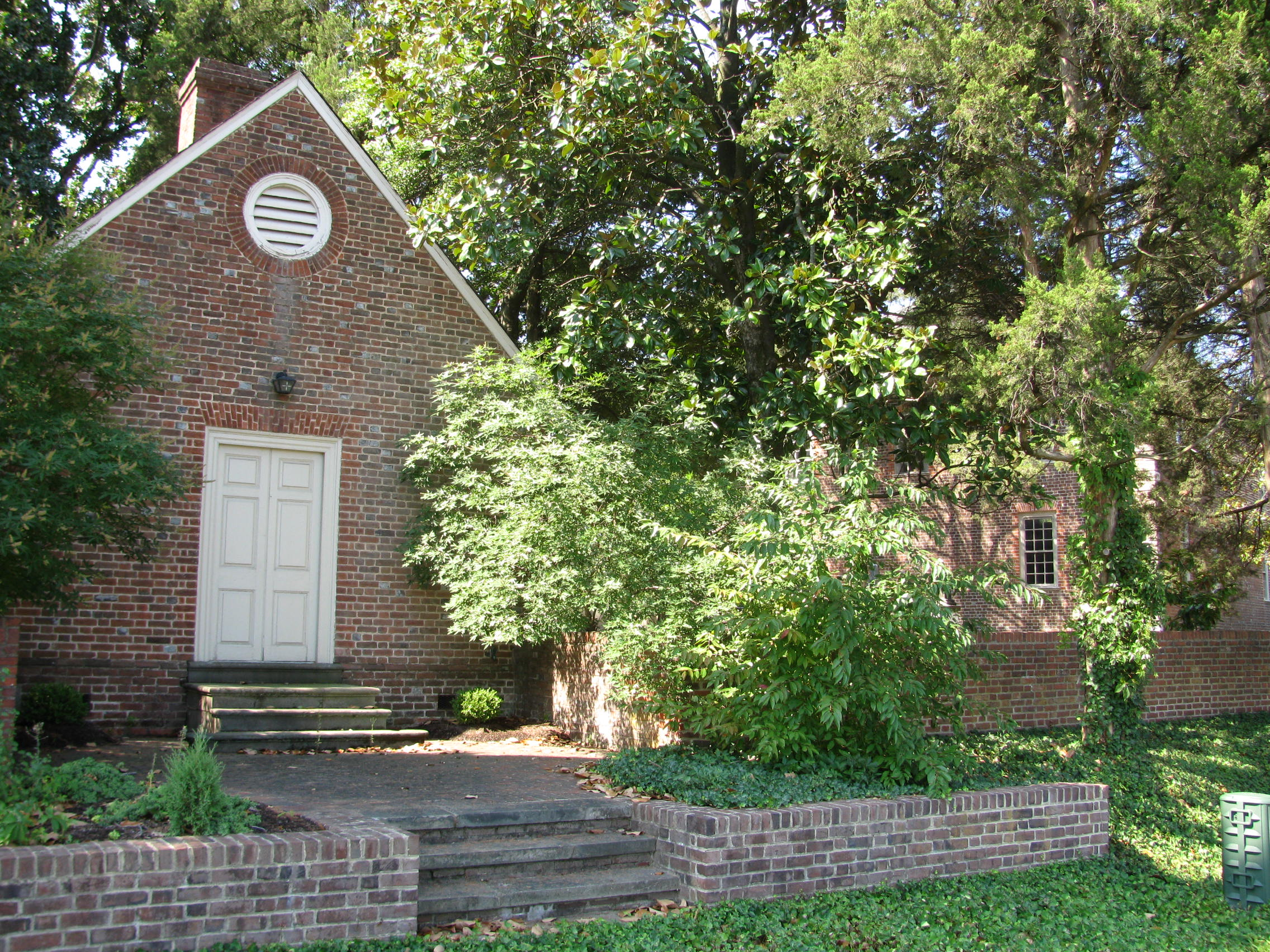
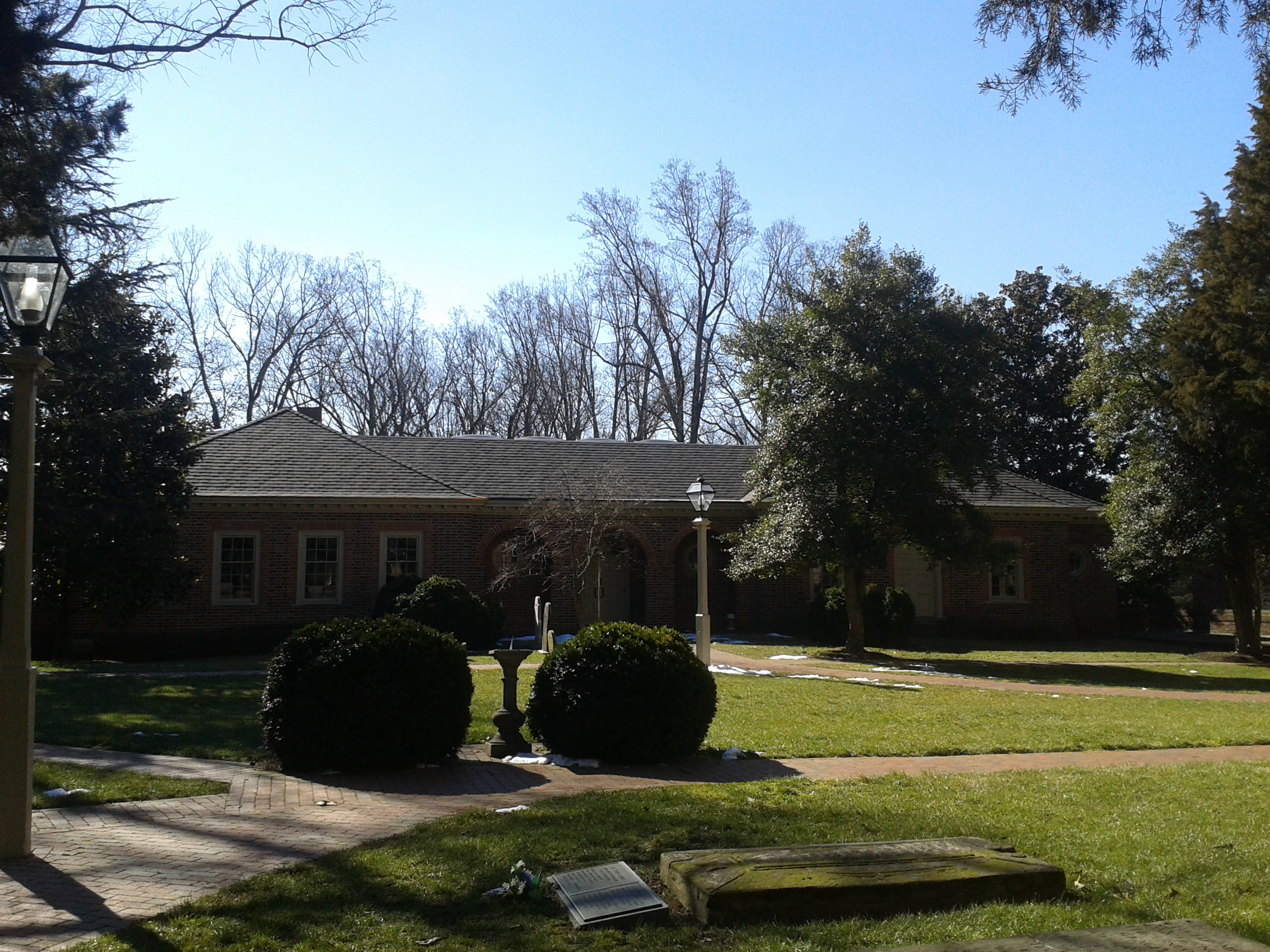
Above: the vestry house, with the church in the near distance. Below: the parish house.

On November 5, 1772, during a meeting of the Truro Parish vestry, it was ordered that a vestry house be built at Pohick Church. Specifications were laid that the structure be built of brick, twenty-four by eighteen feet, with a wooden floor and a chimney inside, three windows, and walls one-and-a-half bricks thick. In 1774 the vestry rescinded its order, as the cost of construction was found to be too great. The plan was revived in 1931 to commemorate the bicentennials of both the parish and the birth of George Washington; the resulting structure, completed in that year, was constructed of old brick and incorporates a fireplace mantel from an 18th-century house and a fender from the 1753 glebe house of the parish. The structure, which stands to the east of the church, continues to be used by the vestry for meetings and contains a gift shop as well, proceeds from whose sales are used to support church missions and other outreach projects.

To the south of the church is a parish house, completed in 1955 in a style complementary to that of the main building; an addition to this structure was constructed in the 1980s. To the southwest sits the rectory, completed in 1963. The belfry in the churchyard was erected at the time of the restoration works in the early twentieth century, and was fitted at its construction with a bronze bell inscribed "In Memory of Washington"; it was the gift of a donor from New York, Augustus Schermerhorn. None of these ancillary structures is included in the National Register nomination, nor are they considered of historic significance in the County's discussions of the site.

== Archives and collections ==
Numerous gifts have been presented to Pohick Church over the years; these include a plate and cup of hammered silver, dating to 1711 and 1716 respectively; a chalice from the United States Marine Corps; a bread box and silver cruets, from the Corps of Engineers; and a silver paten. More recent gifts have included several pieces of silver crafted in Alexandria. A cross for the altar table was provided by the Bishop of Washington, D.C.

Due to the vicissitudes of the congregation's history, the archives of Pohick Church are not extensive. Nevertheless, they do contain a handful of notable books and documents. Chief among these is the original vestry book of Truro Parish, which documents every vestry from 1732 until the organization was disbanded on January 23, 1785. The book was then used by the Overseers of the Poor, legal successors to the vestry, until 1802. The book was lost for 75 years – William Meade writes that he "can hear no tidings" of it in Old Churches and Families in Virginia, published in 1857 – but was eventually repurchased by the church for $20. It was held for a time at Mount Vernon, and was later deposited with the Library of Congress, with copies left with the church office for record-keeping. The vestry book has been digitized, and is available online for perusal.

Other books in the church archive include a 1761 prayer book imported by George Washington, later adapted by erasure and insertion from the old order into the new. A two-volume Bible of 1796 was donated to the church in 1802 by George Washington Parke Custis; it is inscribed inside by him, and further contains an inscription written by a Civil War soldier who took possession of it in 1861. It was later found in a collection of old books which had been donated to the church by an unknown person. Other books in the library have been donated by the Mount Vernon Ladies' Association. The pledge book circulated by Reverend Johnson to raise funds for repairs, which contains the signatures of many notables of the period, still exists. The archive also contains the grave marker of Katherine Popkins, dated 1766, which is the lone surviving stone from the graveyard of the congregation's former location in Colchester.

== Cemetery ==
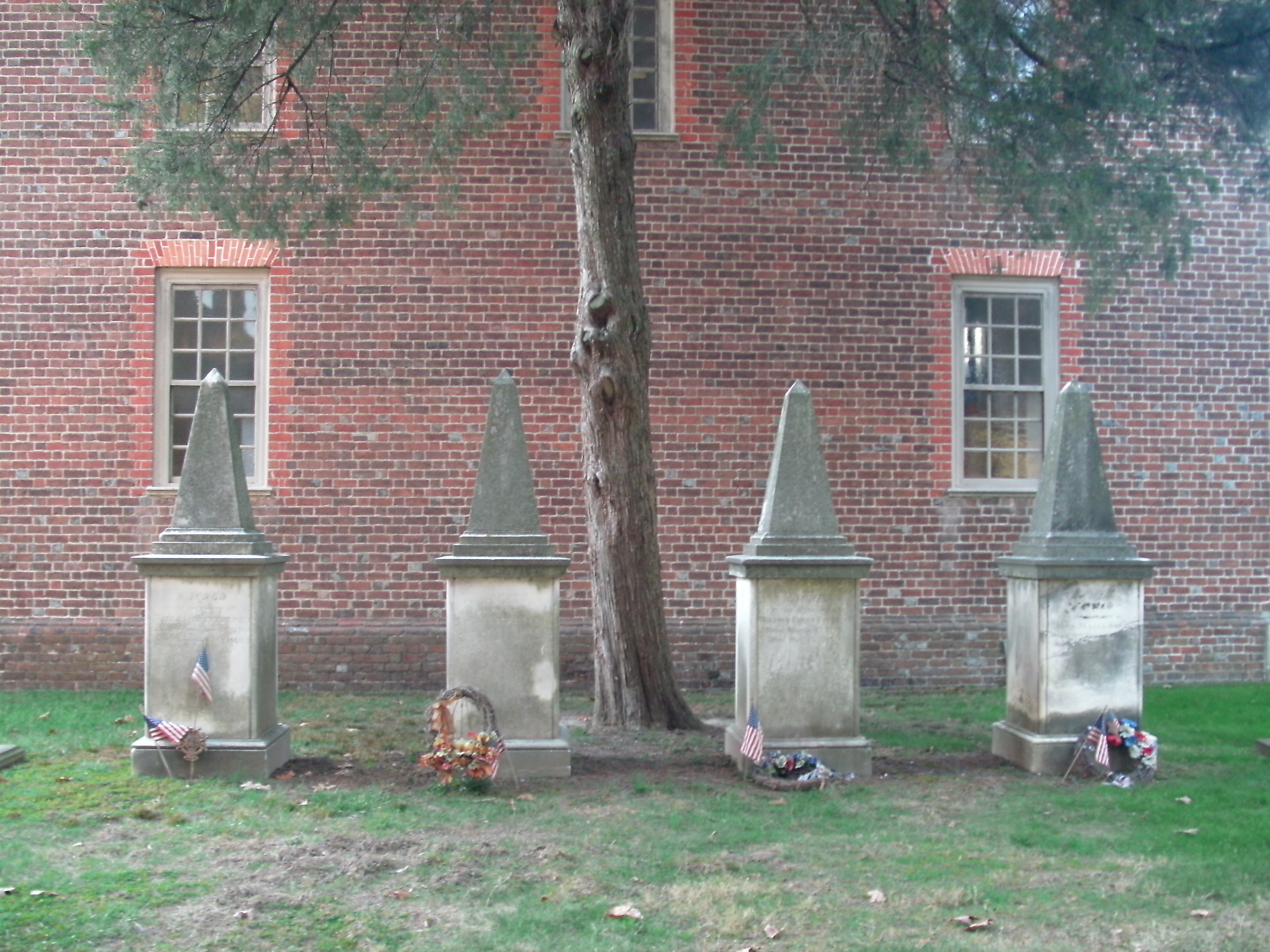
The Fitzhugh family graves in the churchyard, photographed in 2009.

The cemetery of Pohick Church was initially surveyed and platted to the west of the church building, and was only officially organized in 1886. Burials are formally recorded as having taken place in the churchyard beginning in 1840, although oral tradition among some local families indicates that some interments took place as early as the 1790s, and John Gadsby Chapman's painting of the church dated 1835 depicts some tombstones in the yard, several broken or toppled, near the site of the current vestry house. Locations of these earlier graves are now unknown; all pre-1886 grave markers seen in the cemetery today have been moved to the site from elsewhere in Fairfax County. Additional land was added to the cemetery in 1920. A memorial garden, accepting only cremated remains, also exists on the church grounds, at the foot of the belfry. The oldest remaining tombstones original to the cemetery are those of Eliza Harover, erected in 1865, and John Robertson, dating to the following year; the burial of Ann S. Nevitt, on October 2, 1875, is the first for which a written record was kept.

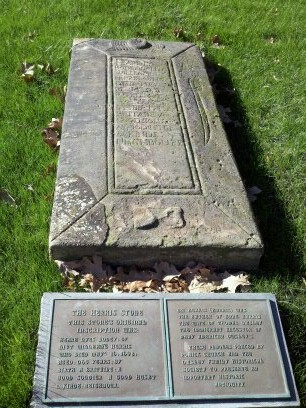
The grave of Will Harris

A number of figures notable in the early history of Fairfax County and the surrounding area are buried in the cemetery, many of their graves having been moved from other sites over the years. Among these are a number of members of the Fitzhugh family, including Continental Congressman William Fitzhugh. The Fitzhugh plantation, Ravensworth, was the centerpiece of the largest landholding in the county; its plantation house was destroyed by fire in 1926, and the graves from the family cemetery were moved to the church in 1957. The graves of several members of the Alexander family, for whom Alexandria is named, were relocated from Preston Plantation in 1922. The grave of Will Harris (died 1698), formerly of Neabsco Plantation in Prince William County, is the oldest in Fairfax County; it was moved from its original location in 1954 as a result of highway construction. Other graves and gravestones in the churchyard were moved from Summer Hill, Bradley, Stisted (in the former town of Colchester), Mount Air, Cedar Grove, Belmont, Springfield, Cameron, and Halstead plantations; also reinterred there were remains from the West family cemetery in Alexandria. Daniel French, original contractor of the present church building, is also buried in the churchyard; at his death in 1771, he was interred at Rose Hill, but his grave was moved in 1954. The grave of the wife of the first rector of the current church, Elizabeth Massey, is near the vestry house; her husband, Lee, is interred inside the church building. Both of their bodies were moved from the cemetery of their plantation, Bradley, in 1908. The grave of William Brown, Surgeon General of the Continental Army and personal physician to George Washington, is also among those which have been removed to the churchyard over the years.

Other notable figures buried at Pohick Church include Marion Moncure Duncan, the 25th President General of the Daughters of the American Revolution, and the novelist and playwright Paul Kester. Kester, whose brother Vaughan is memorialized inside the church, had lived locally at both Gunston Hall and Woodlawn at different stages of his career, and had served for a time as a member of the church vestry. George A. Malcolm, teacher at the Lorton Valley School and Fairfax County deputy sheriff, is also interred in the churchyard; he was shot on April 6, 1905, while attempting to arrest a man who had been harassing students at the school, and became the County's first law enforcement officer to be killed in the line of duty. Harrison Howell Dodge is also buried in the cemetery, as is former White House Chief Usher Howell G. Crim. Near the Fitzhugh graves is a memorial marker to Long Tom, a chief of the Doeg tribe, (Note: Some accounts have claimed that he was a chief of the "Orinoco" or "Oronoco" tribe, but no group of Indians by this name is known in Virginia.) who according to legend was killed by Susanna Alexander to save either herself or her husband John during an attack. According to Alexander family lore, he was buried at the Preston plantation cemetery and his remains were moved to Pohick with those of the family; the exact location of his grave in the churchyard, however, is not known. A memorial to John Augustine Washington, brother of George, was erected by a local chapter of the Daughters of the American Revolution in 1986, but it does not mark a known gravesite. Also in the churchyard is the grave of Carnegie Medal recipient John Charles Springer, who served as a vestryman at the church and as secretary of the Historic Pohick Church Foundation.

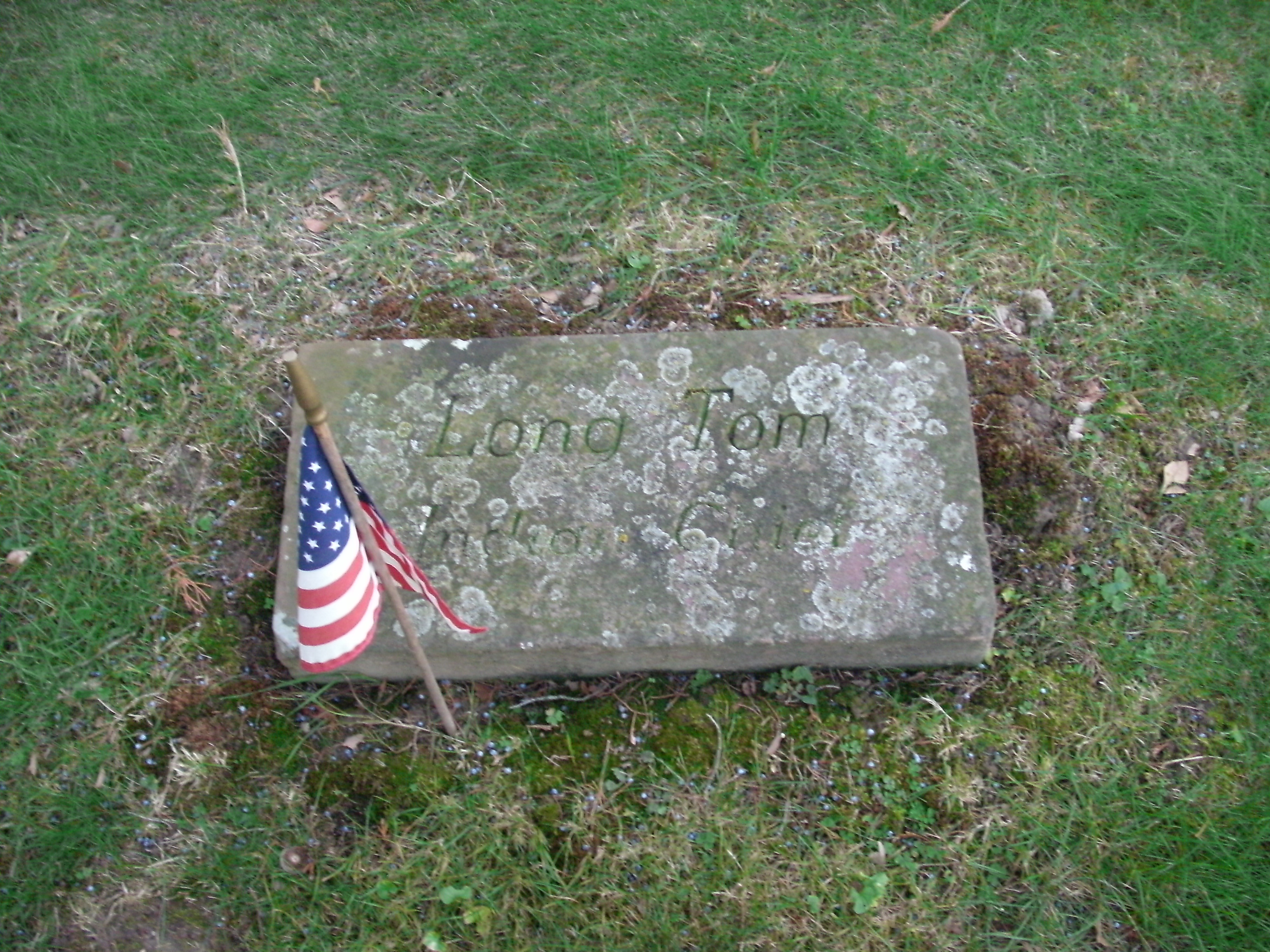
Memorial to Long Tom

A memorial to the unknown dead interred in the cemetery was erected in 1925, and has since been set into the brick wall surrounding the parish house. It reads:

To the Unknown Dead of Pohick Church

this Tribute of Respect is paid the

Many Parishioners Buried in this Hallowed Churchyard

The Records are Lost & the Graves

cannot now be identified

1925

Several surveys of the cemetery have taken place over the years, beginning with that done by Carrie White Avery in 1923. The results of another survey, done in 1967, were published by Edna May Stevens and Lesba Lewis Thompson as Tombstone Records of Pohick Church, Fairfax County, Virginia. A third survey, done by members of the Church of Jesus Christ of Latter-day Saints from the Annandale, Virginia stake, was sponsored by the Fairfax Genealogical Society; its results were checked against earlier parish records, and the entire survey was rechecked for errors in the summer of 1998.

The cemetery remains active and open to members of the congregation for burial; it is not a public cemetery, and interment is restricted to members of the congregation and those non-members with family buried there. Earlier remains continue to be reinterred there as well; if unmarked graves are found on land whose ownership can be traced back to original members of the parish, the church is willing to discuss moving them to the churchyard. Fences and permanent plantings are prohibited in the churchyard, and use of artificial flowers is restricted, as is the design of gravestones.

=== Remeum ===
Charles Mason Remey, a descendant of George Mason, contracted with Pohick Church in 1937 to build a family mausoleum on its grounds, to be located on five acres of land about one half-mile south of the church building. Called "the Remeum", it was to be a "magnificent complex of walled courtyards, underground chambers with soaring vaulted ceilings, marble reliefs and statues, carved pillars, chapels and burial vaults", and was planned as a memorial to his family and its contributions to American history. Construction began in 1939; when finished, the structure was four times the size of Pohick Church itself. Sculptural work was done for the mausoleum by Felix de Weldon; reliefs illustrated historic events in which the family participated, and depicted scenes from the lives of Saints Peter, Paul, and Stephen. The structure was guarded by a pair of sleeping lions, and statues inside included depictions of Faith and Charity as well as a copy of the Bruges Madonna of Michaelangelo and life-sized statues of Remey's parents and wife. Also inside was a massive marble sarcophagus, transported from Lisbon, for Remey himself. The grounds were landscaped, the underground areas electrified. A trust account was established with the church for maintenance. Remey eventually transported the bodies of fifteen other relatives to the mausoleum, mostly from his home state of Iowa. Some two million bricks were used in the construction of the mausoleum, and Remey planned to crown it with a three-story structure that would have dwarfed the church.

Problems soon developed, and the mausoleum site became the target of vandals. As a preventative measure, the entrance was bricked up to prevent access, but the wall was breached in 1956. Local teenagers used the tomb as a venue for drinking and partying. By 1958 the church vestry became concerned, and in 1962 refused to grant permission for any more work to be done on the site. Soon negotiations began to break the original contract; in 1968 the property reverted to the church, and Remey was given five years to remove anything of value from the site. Most of the dead were taken by relatives to another family cemetery in New York; Remey's wife Gertrude was reinterred in the main church cemetery. After the last of the bodies were removed, the Remeum was demolished beginning in 1973, and the last of the aboveground ruins was finally bulldozed ten years later. Little remains on the site to mark the former presence of the complex save an obelisk dedicated to Remey's parents and a pair of structures which served as chimneys or vents.

== Cultural references ==
Pohick Church and its cemetery play a large role in the children's novel Cinnabar, the One O'Clock Fox by Marguerite Henry, published in 1956. Private Robert Knox Sneden of the Union Army was stationed at the church during the Civil War, and it figures prominently in his diary and watercolors, which were published in 2002 as Eye of the Storm and Images of the Storm.

== See also ==
- National Register of Historic Places listings in Fairfax County, Virginia
