= Charles Payne (cricketer, born 1832) =

English cricketer

Personal information
- Full name: Charles Payne
- Born: 12 May 1832; East Grinstead, Sussex
- Died: 18 February 1909 (aged 76); Tonbridge, Kent
- Batting: Right-handed
- Relatives: Joseph Payne (brother); Richard Payne (brother); William Payne (nephew); Alfred Payne (nephew)

Domestic team information
- Years: Team
- 1857–1870: Sussex
- 1863–1870: Kent
- FC debut: 5 June 1857 Sussex v Marylebone Cricket Club (MCC)
- Last FC: 19 August 1875 South v North

Career statistics
Competition	First-class
Matches	88
Runs scored	2,702
Batting average	19.02
100s/50s	2/8
Top score	137
Balls bowled	347
Wickets	7
Bowling average	31.85
5 wickets in innings	0
10 wickets in match	0
Best bowling	3/13
Catches/stumpings	69/–
- Source: ESPNcricinfo, 8 November 2018

Charles Payne (12 May 1832 – 18 February 1909) was an English professional cricketer active from 1857 to 1875 who played in 88 first-class cricket matches, mainly for Sussex County Cricket Club and Kent County Cricket Club. He was born in East Grinstead in Sussex in 1832 and died at Tonbridge in Kent in 1909 aged 76.

Payne was a good batsman who was described as a "very steady forward player ... being a good hitter". He scored 13 runs from one ball in a club match at Tunbridge Wells in 1863 and in 1866 scored Kent's first century at the Bat and Ball Ground in Gravesend, carrying his bat for 135 not out against Surrey. The following year he hit his highest first-class score of 137 for Sussex against Marylebone Cricket Club (MCC). He was also described as "a splendid field at short-leg" and played first-class matches for England teams and the South of England.

Payne stood as an umpire in matches after his retirement as a player. He came from a cricketing family, his brothers Joseph and Richard and nephews Alfred and William all playing first-class cricket for Sussex, with Joseph also making one appearance for Kent.

== Bibliography ==
- Carlaw, Derek (2020). Kent County Cricketers, A to Z: Part One (1806–1914) (PDF). Cardiff: ACS.
