= Alfred Payne (Sussex cricketer) =

English cricketer

Personal information
- Full name: Alfred Payne
- Born: 28 April 1858; East Grinstead, Sussex, England
- Died: 23 July 1943 (aged 85); Uckfield, Sussex, England
- Batting: Right-handed
- Role: Occasional wicket-keeper
- Relatives: William Payne (brother); Charles Payne (uncle); Richard Payne (uncle); Joseph Payne (uncle)

Domestic team information
- Years: Team
- 1880–1886: Sussex

Career statistics
| Competition | First-class |
|---|---|
| Matches | 18 |
| Runs scored | 275 |
| Batting average | 9.16 |
| 100s/50s | 0/0 |
| Top score | 42 |
| Balls bowled | 20 |
| Wickets | 0 |
| Bowling average | – |
| 5 wickets in innings | 0 |
| 10 wickets in match | 0 |
| Best bowling | – |
| Catches/stumpings | 8/1 |
- Source: Cricinfo, 17 June 2012

Alfred Payne (28 April 1858 – 23 July 1943) was an English cricketer. Payne was a right-handed batsman whose bowling style is unknown, though it is known he fielded occasionally as a wicket-keeper. He was born at East Grinstead, Sussex.

Payne made his first-class debut for Sussex against the Marylebone Cricket Club at Lord's in 1880. He made sixteen further first-class appearances for the county, the last of which came against Gloucestershire in 1886. In his seventeen matches for Sussex, he scored 275 runs at an average of 9.16, with a high score of 42. He also made a single first-class appearance for the Players against the Gentlemen in 1881.

Outside of cricket, Payne worked as a shoemaker, an occupation which had long been associated with his family. It is known that by 1881 he was single and living with his parents, William and Harriett, both in their sixties. He died at Uckfield, Sussex, on 23 July 1943. His brother, William, played first-class cricket, as did his uncles Charles Payne, Richard Payne and Joseph Payne.
