= Richard Payne (cricketer, born 1827) =

English cricketer

Personal information
- Full name: Richard Payne
- Born: 9 June 1827; East Grinstead, Sussex, England
- Died: 11 April 1906 (aged 78); Tonbridge, Kent, England
- Batting: Right-handed
- Bowling: Right-arm roundarm/underarm medium
- Relatives: Charles Payne (brother); Joseph Payne (brother); William Payne (nephew); Alfred Payne (nephew)

Domestic team information
- Years: Team
- 1853–1866: Sussex

Career statistics
Competition	First-class
Matches	7
Runs scored	81
Batting average	6.75
100s/50s	0/0
Top score	28
Balls bowled	92
Wickets	3
Bowling average	16.66
5 wickets in innings	0
10 wickets in match	0
Best bowling	2/23
Catches/stumpings	4/–
- Source: Cricinfo, 17 June 2012

Richard Payne (9 June 1827 – 11 April 1906) was an English cricketer. Payne was a right-handed batsman who bowled right-arm medium with both roundarm and underarm bowling styles. He was born at East Grinstead, Sussex.

Payne made his first-class debut for Sussex against Nottinghamshire at Trent Bridge in 1853. He made six further first-class appearances for the county, the last of which came against Kent in 1866 at the Higher Common Ground, Tunbridge. In his seven matches for Sussex, he scored 81 runs at an average of 6.75, with a high score of 28. With the ball, he took 3 wickets at a bowling average of 16.66, with best figures of 2/23.

He died at Tonbridge, Kent, on 11 April 1906. His brothers, Charles and Joseph, played first-class cricket, as did his nephews William Payne and Alfred Payne.
