= William Payne (cricketer) =

English cricketer

Personal information
- Full name: William Payne
- Born: 6 August 1854; East Grinstead, Sussex, England
- Died: 25 June 1909 (aged 54); East Grinstead, Sussex, England
- Batting: Right-handed
- Bowling: Right-arm medium
- Relatives: Alfred Payne (brother); Charles Payne (uncle); Richard Payne (uncle); Joseph Payne (uncle)

Domestic team information
- Years: Team
- 1877–1883: Sussex

Career statistics
Competition	First-class
Matches	18
Runs scored	189
Batting average	7.26
100s/50s	0/0
Top score	37*
Balls bowled	1,457
Wickets	25
Bowling average	19.60
5 wickets in innings	0
10 wickets in match	0
Best bowling	3/34
Catches/stumpings	9/–
- Source: Cricinfo, 17 June 2012

William Payne (6 August 1854 – 25 June 1909) was an English cricketer. Payne was a right-handed batsman who bowled right-arm medium pace. He was born at East Grinstead, Sussex.

Payne made his first-class debut for the South against the North in 1877 at Argyle Street, Kingston upon Hull. It was in 1877 that he made his first-class debut for Sussex against Lancashire at Old Trafford. He made sixteen further first-class appearances for the county, the last of which came against Derbyshire in 1883. In his seventeen matches for Sussex, he scored 180 runs at an average of 7.50, with a high score of 37 not out. With the ball, he took 25 wickets at a bowling average of 19.60, with best figures of 3/34.

Below first-class, he played at county level for Sbropshire between 1897 and 1905, while playing at club level for Whittington and being engaged as club professional at nearby Park Hall. He played 24 county matches, totaled 555 runs and took 55 wickets.

Outside of cricket, Payne worked as a shoemaker, an occupation which had long been associated with his family. It is known that by 1881 he was married to his wife, Emily, with whom he had a three-month-old daughter. He died at the town of his birth on 25 June 1909. His brother, Alfred, played first-class cricket, as did his uncles Charles Payne, Richard Payne and Joseph Payne.
