= The Falls Church =

Historic church in Virginia, US

- Falls Church
- U.S. National Register of Historic Places
- Virginia Landmarks Register
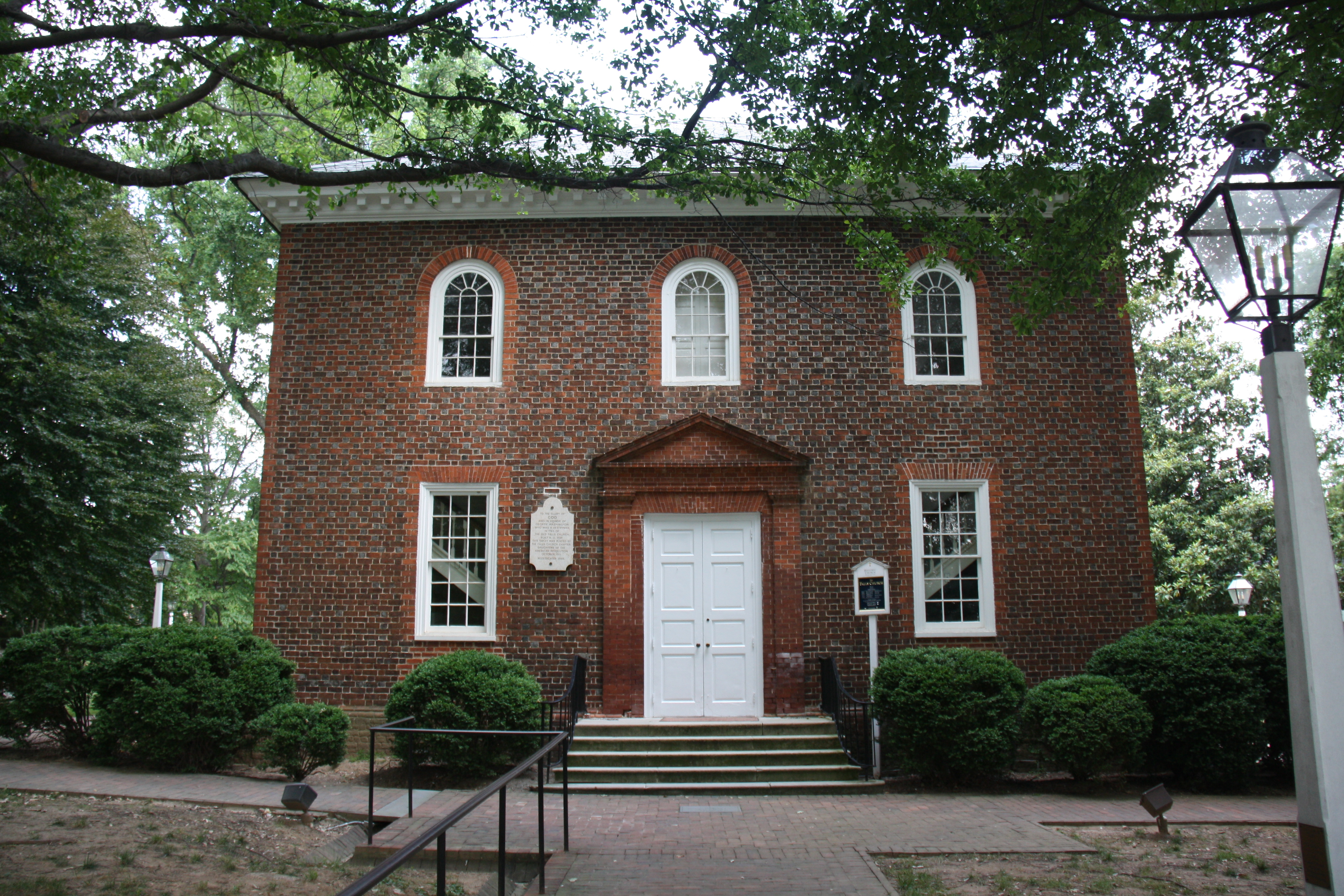

- Location within Northern Virginia Location within Virginia Location within the United States
- Location: 115 E. Fairfax St., Falls Church, Virginia
- Coordinates: 38°52′51″N 77°10′16″W
- Area: 0 acres (0 ha)
- Built: 1767
- Architect: James Wren
- NRHP reference No.: 70000870
- VLR No.: 110-0001

Significant dates
- Added to NRHP: February 26, 1970
- Designated VLR: December 2, 1969

The Falls Church is an Episcopal church in the United States in its namesake city of Falls Church, Virginia, near Washington, D.C. Established in 1732, the church is a brick building which was built in 1769 and still remains in use.

== History ==
=== Colonial beginnings ===
The forerunner to the Falls Church appears to have been founded by landowner William Gunnell, who had moved from Westmoreland County, Virginia, in 1729. In early 1730, he secured a cleric and convened a congregation which met in his home until 1733 when the first building was constructed. Until that time, the area was served by a cleric who lived near present-day Quantico, and the nearest church was Pohick Church near Lorton.

Known as "William Gunnell's Church", the new wooden structure was designed and built by Colonel Richard Blackburn, who was directed to construct a weatherboarded building forty feet by twenty-two feet, with a 13:12 pitch roof, and with interior work modeled on that of Pohick Church; the cost was 33,500 pounds of tobacco. Like Pohick Church, the new church served Truro Parish, which had been established by the colonial Virginia Assembly in May 1732 for the land north of the Occoquan River; Truro's first vestry met in November 1732. Michael Reagan allowed the church to be built on his land but failed to grant the deed. John Trammell later bought the land and, in 1746, sold the two-acre lot, including the church, the churchyard, and a spring, to the vestry of Truro Parish. By this point, it was known as the Upper Church.

The Vestry Book first referred to it as the "Falls Church" on November 28, 1757, owing to its location at the intersection of the road to the Little Falls of the Potomac River (upstream of the Chain Bridge) and the Middle Turnpike (leading from Alexandria to Leesburg, now Virginia Route 7 or Leesburg Pike, called West Broad Street in downtown Falls Church City).

George Mason was elected vestryman in 1748, as was George Washington in 1762.

=== New brick church ===
By 1762, the wood building had fallen into decay and the vestry ordered a new brick building to be constructed on the same site. The next year, George Washington and George William Fairfax, as church wardens, assumed responsibility to contract for the new building. After 1765, this church became the seat of the new Fairfax Parish.

The new church was designed by Colonel James Wren, a member of the vestry. Work commenced in 1767 and completed in late fall 1769. Wren, a slaveowner, used enslaved people to do the work.

The Wren building remains on the site, between S. Washington, E. Broad, and E. Fairfax Streets. The 1769 structure is the oldest remaining church building north of Quantico in Virginia and is one of the oldest church structures in the United States.

=== Revolutionary War and aftermath ===
The Fairfax Militia recruited from the church during the Revolutionary War, and it is said that at the war's end, the Declaration of Independence was read to citizens from the steps of the south doors. In 1784, the Commonwealth of Virginia revoked the status of the Anglican Church as state church. In 1789, the Falls Church was abandoned and remained unoccupied for almost 50 years; in 1836, it was reoccupied by an Episcopal congregation. Francis Scott Key was a lay reader of this congregation, as was Henry Fairfax, who used his own funds to restore the building during 1838 and 1839.

=== Civil War disruption and damage ===
During the American Civil War the church was used by Union troops as a hospital and later as a stable. Use of the building for worship services resumed after the war; the sanctuary has now been in continuous use since about 1873. The interior was repaired after the war, with the federal government paying for damage caused by Union forces. Some of these repairs can be discerned in brickwork below the windows and in the lower part of the brick doorway at the west end of the church.

The church was remodeled in 1908 and extensively renovated in 1959. Galleries in Wren's original design but never constructed were installed, and a new chancel was added. Other than repairs of war damage and the chancel addition, the structure reflects the original 1769 construction.

== Disaffiliation and church ownership issues ==
Between 2006 and 2014 the congregation became divided on religious issues, and the buildings and property of the congregation became the subject of protracted litigation.

In December 2006, about 90% of the congregation voted to disaffiliate from the Episcopal Church in the United States of America (ECUSA) (a member of the Anglican Communion), and join the Convocation of Anglicans in North America (CANA). The minority group reorganized itself as the Falls Church (Episcopal) and began holding services across the street at Falls Church Presbyterian Church. The disaffiliating majority renamed itself The Falls Church Anglican and continued to worship at the Falls Church property and later petitioned a local court to transfer ownership of the property to CANA. The Episcopal Diocese of Virginia, of the Episcopal Church, intervened in the case and resisted the transfer. After a series of trial court rulings and appeals, the Virginia Supreme Court affirmed a trial court decision that left the church property in the hands of the Episcopal Church.

The Episcopal parish returned to worshiping at the historic property, and the Anglican parish moved to a different location. In March 2014, the U.S. Supreme Court declined to hear an appeal by the Falls Church Anglican, ending the matter.
