= Fairfax Parish, Virginia =

Fairfax Parish was the ecclesiastical jurisdiction of the Anglican church in colonial Virginia with jurisdiction over part of Fairfax County with its central church located at The Falls Church. The parish was created in 1764 from Truro Parish.

== Formation of the parish ==
The Anglican church was the established religion of the Colony of Virginia from 1619 - 1776. Each parish in the colony was ministered to by a single minister and governed by a vestry usually composed of 12 local men of wealth and standing in the community. Parishes were created by acts of the House of Burgesses and the upper house of the legislature, the Governor's Council.

Starting in 1761, residents of the northern reaches of Truro Parish petitioned the Assembly to divide the parish. The Assembly acted in 1764 and created the Fairfax Parish in the areas north of a line "by Doeg creek from the mouth thereof to Mr. George Washington's mill, and from thence, by a straight line, to the plantation, of John Munroe, and the same course continued to the line that divides the counties of Fairfax and Loudoun." It appears that the portion of Truro that remained in that parish was disadvantaged and in 1765 the boundaries were redrawn to place Washington's plantation at Mount Vernon and nearby farms back into Truro.

Drawn over today's civil boundaries, Fairfax Parish would include all of the City of Alexandria, Arlington County, the City of Falls Church, the City of Fairfax, and the western and northern areas of Fairfax County.

== Places of worship ==
The main church was located near the falls line and was called the Falls Church. Christ Church in Alexandria was also a chapel of the parish. In addition, The Glebe of Fairfax Parish were the lands and house set aside for the maintenance of the parish and a dwelling for the minister. They are located in present-day Arlington County, with the current house dating to 1810, after the disestablishment of the church.

== See also ==
Episcopal Diocese of Virginia:History
