= Fairfax County Sheriff's Office =

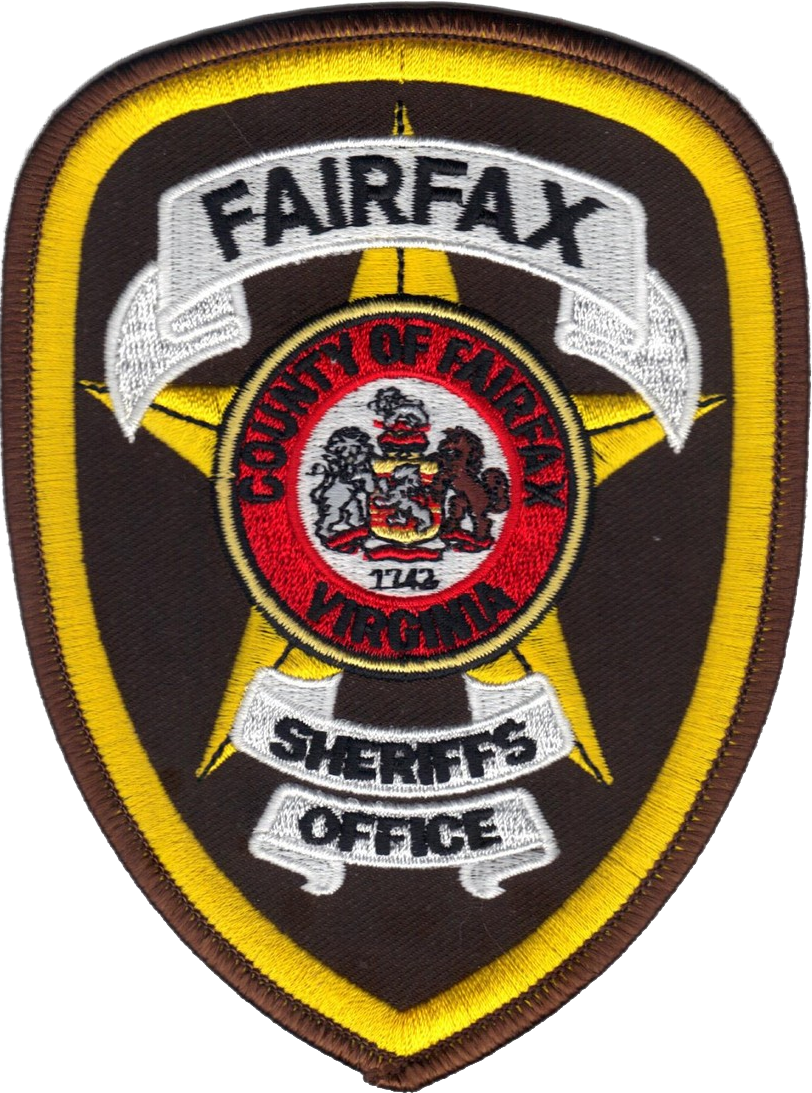
- Patch of the Fairfax County Sheriff's Office, adopted in 1989.

- Seal of Fairfax County

- Flag of Fairfax County
- Common name: Fairfax County Sheriff's Office
- Abbreviation: FCSO

Agency overview
- Formed: 1742
- Employees: 552
- Annual budget: 24,596,887

Jurisdictional structure
- Operations jurisdiction: Fairfax County, Virginia, U.S.
- Area: 407 square miles (1,050 km^{2})
- Population: 1,141,897
- Governing body: Fairfax County, Virginia
- General nature: Local civilian police

Operational structure
- Headquarters: Fairfax, Virginia, U.S.
- Deputy Sheriffs: 466
- Civilians: 86
- Agency executive: Stacey Kincaid (D), Sheriff

Facilities
- Stations: 2
- Jails: 2

Website
- Official website

The Fairfax County Sheriff's Office (FCSO), officially the Fairfax County Office of the Sheriff, is a law enforcement agency in Fairfax County, Virginia. It serves a population of approximately 1,141,620 residents within an area of approximately 400 square miles (1,000 km^{2}) in Fairfax County, a Northern Virginian suburb of Washington, D.C. It is one of the largest Sheriff's Offices in Virginia with nearly 600 sworn deputies. The Sheriff and her deputies are fully sworn law enforcement officers with full arrest powers within Fairfax County, the City of Fairfax, and Herndon and Vienna. The Sheriff's Office assists the Fairfax County Police Department and other law enforcement agencies to maintain peace and order in Fairfax County.

== About the Sheriff's Office ==
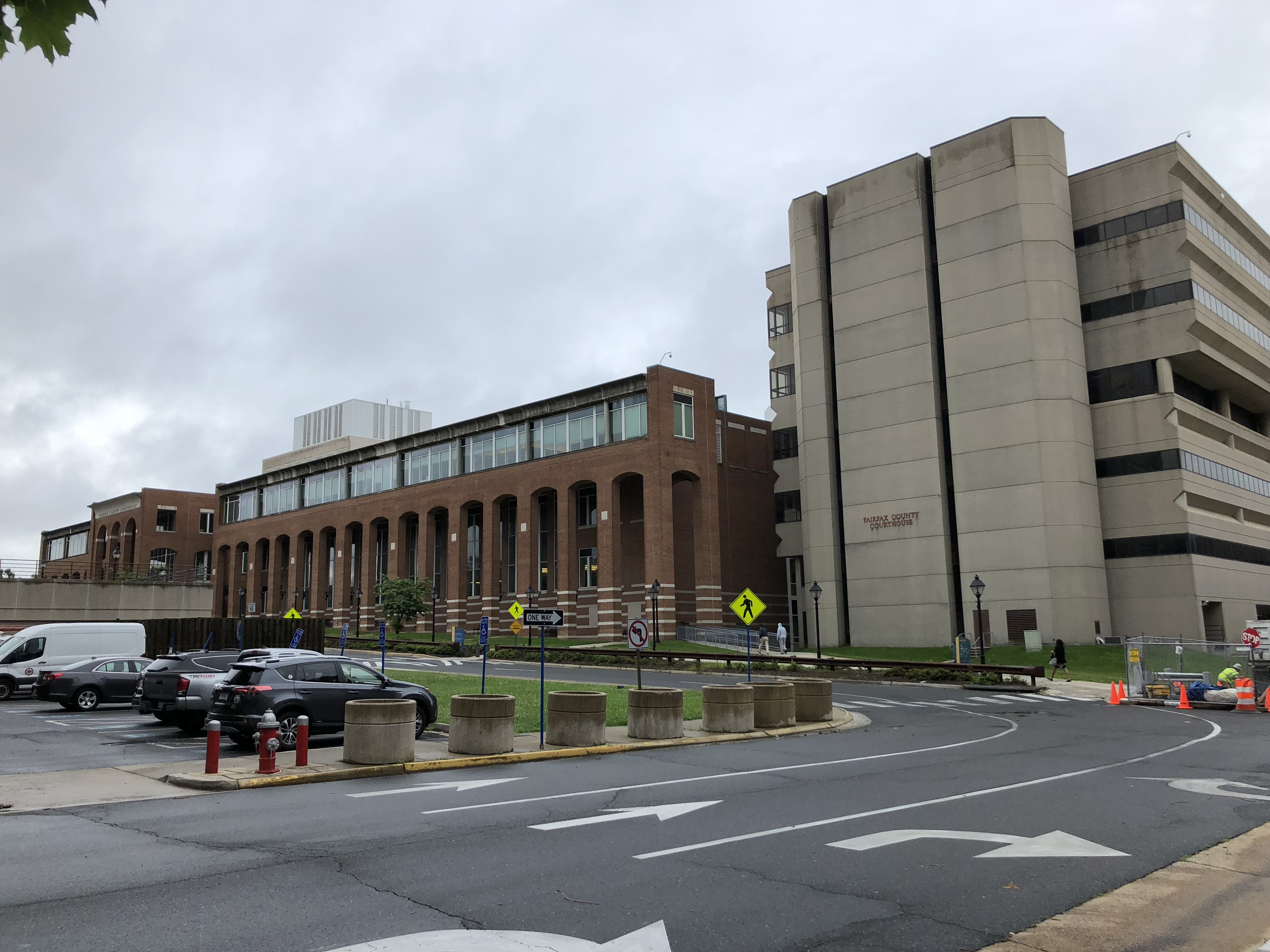
The Fairfax County courthouse and jail complex houses the sheriff's office.

The Sheriff’s Office was created in 1742, at the same time Fairfax County was formed, and is now one of three public safety agencies responsible for the safety and well-being of the 1.1 million residents of Fairfax County. Sheriff Stacey A. Kincaid and her deputies also serves the 65,000 residents of the City of Fairfax and towns of Herndon and Vienna.

The position of Sheriff is established by the Constitution of Virginia. At best count, there have been 77 sheriffs in Fairfax County since 1742, including Sheriff Stacey A. Kincaid. Though early sheriffs served for terms of two years, the people elect the current position every four years.

== Core Functions about the Sheriff's Office ==
- Operate the Adult Detention Center;
- Provide security for the courtrooms, Courthouse and surrounding complex; and
- Serve/execute civil law process on behalf of the courts.

In addition, the Sheriff's Office has an active community engagement program.

Sheriff Kincaid helped launch Diversion First so that incarceration would no longer be the default solution for people experiencing a mental health crisis.

The Sheriff’s Office is accredited by the National Commission on Correctional Health Care, American Correctional Association, Virginia Department of Corrections and Virginia Law Enforcement Professional Standards Commission. The Sheriff’s Office also participates in several state, county and internal audits throughout the year.

=== Staff ===
- 501 employees of which 466 are sworn law enforcement officers
- 29 percent women
- 35 percent people of color
- 6 percent military veterans

== Organization ==
Stacey Kincaid is the Sheriff of Fairfax County, City of Fairfax and towns of Herndon and Vienna. The residents of these jurisdictions elected her in 2013, and again in 2015, 2019, and 2023 to lead the Fairfax County Sheriff’s Office.

Her Command Staff includes two chief deputies and four majors, each of whom commands a division. The remaining rank structure, in order, includes captain, first lieutenant, second lieutenant, sergeant, master deputy sheriff, deputy sheriff first class and deputy sheriff. In addition to sworn staff, the Sheriff’s Office employs civilian nurses, correctional technicians and administrative personnel to support the agency’s mission.

== Rank structure ==
This is the rank structure used by the Fairfax County Police Department as of 2023.

Rank	Insignia	Description
Sheriff		Head of the Sheriffs Office (Elected)
Chief Deputy		Chief Deputy runs bureaus such as Operations & Administration
Major		Majors runs units such as Confinement, Support Services, Court Services, Administrative Services
Captain		District Station Commander / Division Commander
First Lieutenant		District Station / Division Assistant Commander
Second Lieutenant		Patrol shift / Section Supervisor
Sergeant		Section / Patrol Supervisor
Master Deputy Sheriff		Career Progression, based on competitive process. 2 per patrol shift/one per detective squad and typically are field training officers
Deputy Sheriff First Class		Career Progression, automatic after 4 years of satisfactory service
Deputy Sheriff		Career Progression, automatic after 2 years of satisfactory service
Probationary Deputy Sheriff		Status upon graduating the police academy

== History ==
The Sheriff's Office was formed in 1742 when Fairfax County was created from Prince William County, Virginia. The sheriff is a position established under the Virginia Constitution. The sheriff is elected every four years. There have been 70 elected sheriffs in Fairfax County. As of 2026 the current Sheriff is Stacey Kincaid, who was first elected in a 2013 special election, and is the county's first female sheriff.

The Fairfax County Sheriff's Office responsibilities have changed since its inception. It was the primary law enforcement agency in the county until 1940. That year Sheriff Eppa P. Kirby persuaded the Virginia General Assembly to separate the law enforcement role of the county police from the Sheriff's Office. On July 1, 1940, the Fairfax County Police Department became a separate agency under the control of Board of Supervisors.

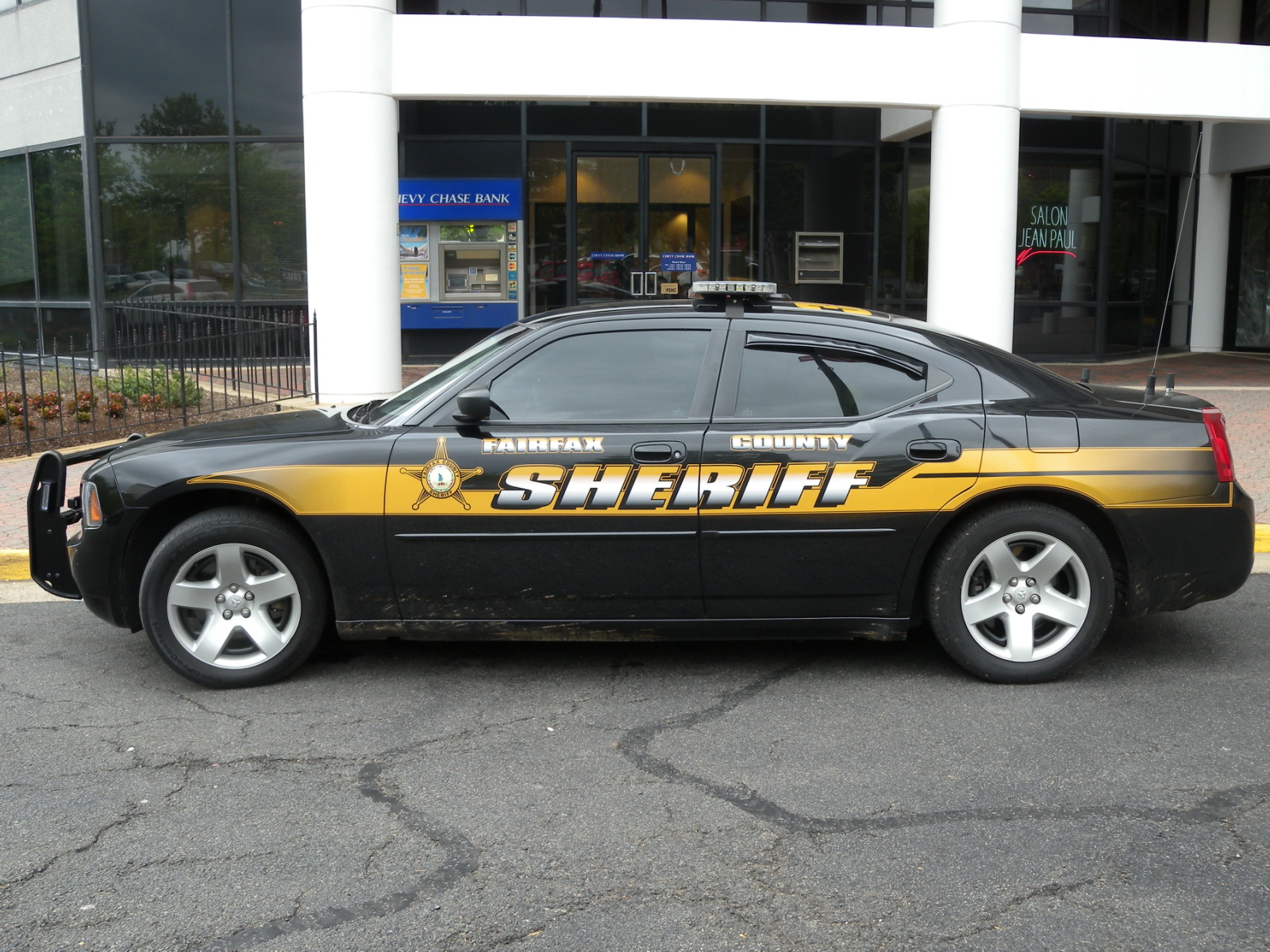
A Fairfax County Sheriff's Office cruiser in 2009

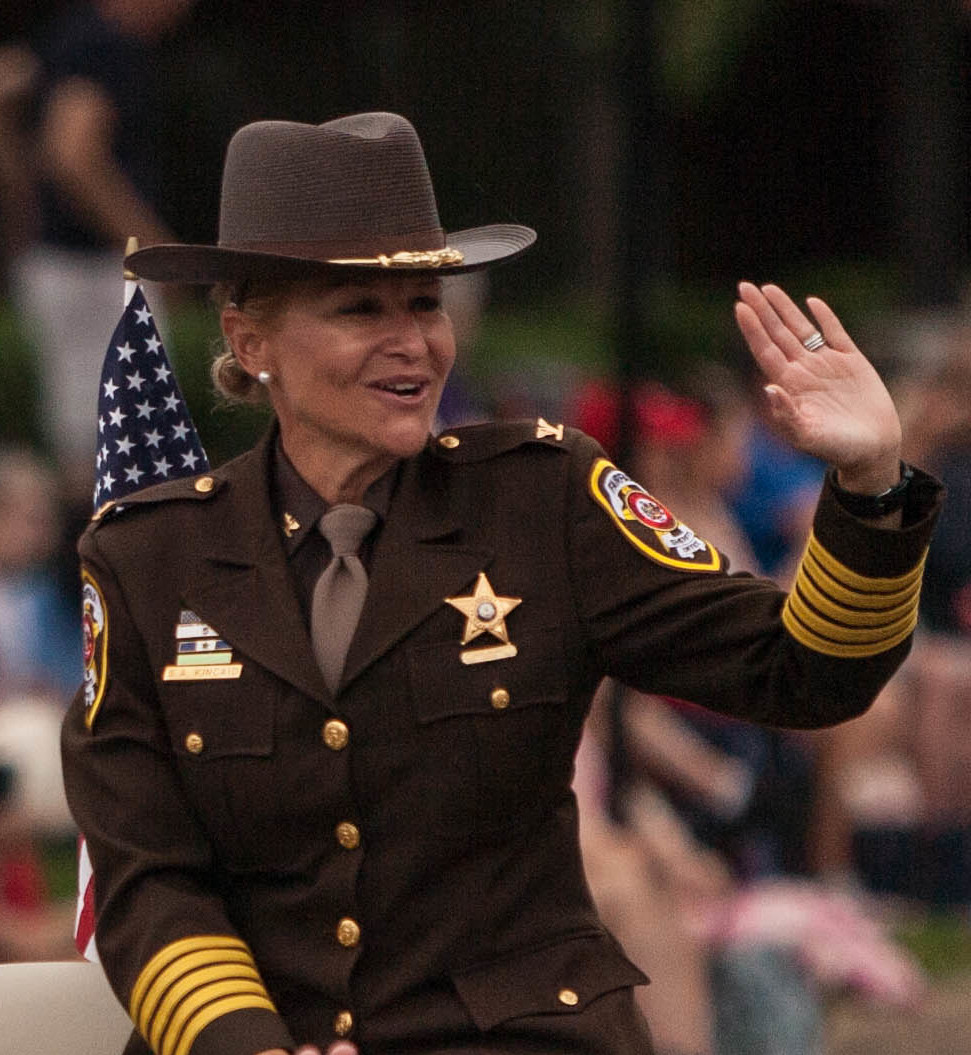
Sheriff Stacey Kincaid appearing in a parade in July 2016

== See also ==
- List of law enforcement agencies in Virginia
- Fairfax County Police Department
