= Truro Parish, Virginia =

Truro Parish was the ecclesiastical jurisdiction of the Anglican church in colonial Virginia with jurisdiction originally over all of Fairfax County. The parish had its central church at the Truro Church and the parish was named for the parish in Truro in Cornwall. The parish was created on November 1, 1732 from Hamilton Parish. It was divided twice: in 1748, Cameron Parish was formed and in 1764 Fairfax Parish was created. After 1765, Truro Parish covered southern Fairfax County until disestablishment ended the parish system by 1786.

== The parish in colonial Virginia ==
The Anglican church was the established religion of the Colony of Virginia from 1619 - 1776. Each parish in the colony was ministered to by a single minister and governed by a vestry usually composed of 12 local men of wealth and standing in the community. Parishes were created by acts of the House of Burgesses and the upper house of the legislature, the Governor's Council.

== Formation of the parish ==
Truro Parish was created by the General Assembly of Virginia on November 1, 1732 when Hamilton Parish was divided along the Occoquan River and Bull Run. It included what is, at present, Arlington, Fairfax, and Loudoun counties, and the independent cities of Alexandria, Fairfax, and Falls Church. The parish was named after Truro in Cornwall, England.

Truro Parish initially covered all of the land north of those rivers up to the Potomac, and westward all the way to the Blue Ridge Mountains at Ashby's Gap. The parish originally contained three churches: Occoquan (the parish seat), William Gunnell's, and a chapel "above Goose Creek". The exact locations of the second two are unknown, but the Occoquan church was later known as Pohick Church, which still stands. In 1733, work was started on a new church "near Michael Reagan's"; this was at the site of the present-day Falls Church. In 1742, Fairfax County was created out of Prince William and the boundaries of Truro Parish were adjusted to conform to the boundary between the civil counties.

On June 11, 1749, the parish was divided in two, with the newly formed Cameron Parish constituting the portion north and west of Difficult Run and Popes Head Run. George Mason, author of the Virginia Articles that presaged the Bill of Rights, was elected to the vestry that year.

In 1753, the first church service at the new town of Alexandria was recorded. George Washington was appointed to the Truro Parish vestry on October 25, 1762. His father, Augustine Washington, had served on the vestry for a few years, starting in 1735.

Truro Parish was further split on February 1, 1765. The new boundary was just south of Washington's estate, and the northern portion became Fairfax Parish, with The Falls Church as its seat. Parishioners of Truro, however, complained that the division was far more favorable to Fairfax Parish, and succeeded in having a new border drawn through Washington's estate, such that Washington was deemed to reside in Truro and he was elected to that vestry.

Drawn over today's civil boundaries, Truro Parish's final incarnation would include the Southern and Southwestern part of Fairfax County.

== Places of worship ==
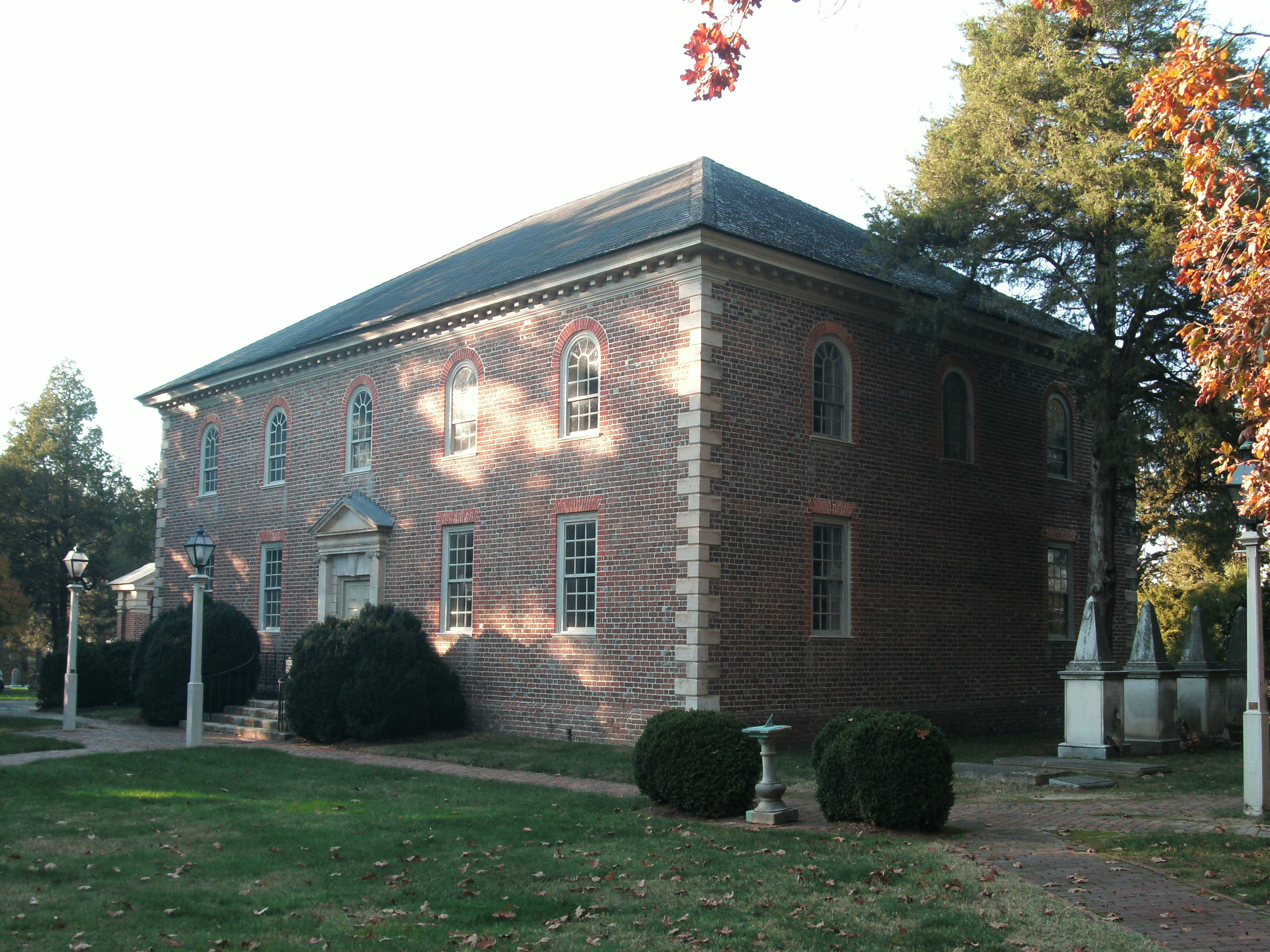
The Occoquan Church was the central church of Truro Parish and today is known as the Pohick Church

Within the parish, at formation, there were three churches: Occoquan (now known as Pohick Church), William Gunnells, and a chapel "above Goose Creek." The Goose Creek chapel would later become part of Cameron Parish. In 1766, a new church was established "on the middle ridge near Ox Road", the present site of Jerusalem Baptist Church off Virginia State Route 123. The Truro Parish vestry contracted Edward Payne to build this new church and it became known as "Payne's Church".

Other church buildings were constructed including replacements for The Falls Church (started in 1763, while it was still part of Truro Parish) and the current Pohick Church in 1767.

== See also ==
Episcopal Diocese of Virginia:History
