= Julian Dobbs =

New Zealand-born American Anglican bishop (born 1968)

The Right Reverend Julian Dobbs
- Bishop of the Diocese of the Living Word
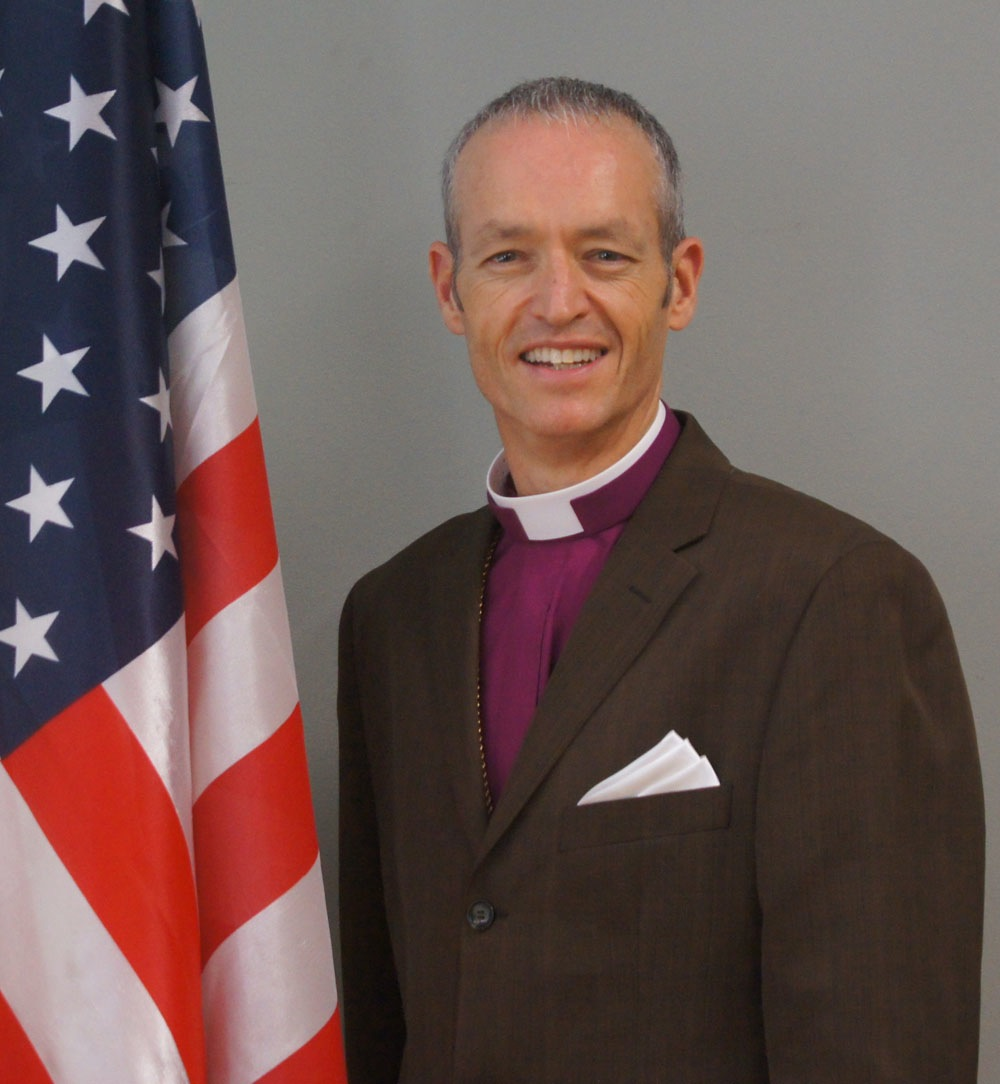
- Church: Anglican Church in North America
- Diocese: Living Word
- In office: 2013–present
- Other posts: Provincial dean, ACNA (2025–present)

Orders
- Ordination: 1991 (diaconate), 1992 (priesthood)
- Consecration: 25 September 2011 by Nicholas Okoh

Personal details
- Born: 1968 (age 57–58) New Zealand
- Spouse: Brenda Dobbs
- Children: 3
- Education: St John's College, Auckland

Ordination history
History
Episcopal consecration
- Consecrated by: Nicholas Okoh
Episcopal succession
Bishops consecrated by Julian Dobbs as principal consecrator
- Billy Waters: February 3, 2026

Julian Mark Dobbs (born 1968) is a New Zealand-born American Anglican bishop. He is the first diocesan bishop of the Anglican Diocese of the Living Word (ADLW), a jurisdiction of the Anglican Church in North America (ACNA). Since 2025, he has been provincial dean of the ACNA and thus acting archbishop during the inhibition and ecclesiastical trial of Steve Wood.

Dobbs began his ordained ministry in his native New Zealand. He and his family migrated to the United States in 2006 to lead Barnabas Aid USA. As a leader within Barnabas Aid, Dobbs became a high-profile figure in media for his commentary on Islam and persecuted Christians. He also became part of the Anglican realignment movement as a leader in the Church of Nigeria (CON)-based Convocation of Anglicans in North America. In 2011, Dobbs was made a suffragan bishop of the Church of Nigeria to serve in CANA, an ecclesiastical jurisdiction that was part of both the ACNA and the CON. In 2013, he became the first diocesan bishop of the Missionary Diocese of CANA East, which eventually became resident solely in the ACNA as the Diocese of the Living Word.

== Early life, education and ministry ==
Dobbs was born in New Zealand in 1968. He received a licentiate in theology from St John's College, Auckland, in 1990, and was ordained as a deacon in 1991 and a priest in 1992, both in the Anglican Diocese of Nelson in the Anglican Church in Aotearoa, New Zealand and Polynesia. Early posts in his career included churches in Westport and Nelson. He was vicar in Bishopdale and regional dean from 1996 to 2004 and a canon at Christ Church Cathedral from 2003 to 2004.

== Barnabas Aid ==
In 2005, Dobbs was appointed the New Zealand director of the Barnabas Fund, where he led the Institute for the Study of Islam and Christianity. He also served as an adviser to the bishop of Nelson on issues related to persecuted Christians. Dobbs and his family in 2006 moved to Virginia in the United States, where Dobbs led Barnabas Aid USA as executive director and eventually as a board member, chair and president. Dobbs and his wife, Brenda, who was also an Anglican priest, were received as priests by the Episcopal Diocese of Pittsburgh in December 2006.

Dobbs remained affiliated with Barnabas Aid until 2018. That year, Barnabas Aid investigated the expenses of Dobbs and his wife, who had been an office manager for the charity. Internal Barnabas Aid communications said the Dobbses had $28,200 in "unexplained" expenses, according to The Washington Post, and accused the Dobbses of running another charity, Katartismos Global, from the Barnabas Aid USA office without informing officials at the parent charity and using Barnabas Aid's mailing list. In the internal communications, Dobbs denied any deception in their expenses. In 2019, Barnabas Aid sent its memos and a complaint to then-ACNA Archbishop Foley Beach. Beach commissioned Bishop William C. Wantland, a former Seminole Nation Supreme Court chief justice, and ACNA vice chancellor Jeff Garrety to investigate the claims and responded that they had found no evidence of "willful wrongdoing" and no basis for disciplinary action. Dobbs told the Post that the allegations were unsubstantiated and "without merit", and Barnabas Aid International board chairman Michael Hewat, who was a trustee when the investigation was done, said he had no reason to doubt Dobbs' account. Barnabas Aid sources told The Times a recent review had raised no cause for suspicion.

== Anglican realignment and Islam ==
Dobbs was appointed canon missioner for the Convocation of Anglicans in North America, a group of former Episcopal congregations in the United States that had disaffiliated from the Episcopal Church and sought to be under the oversight of the Church of Nigeria. Part of his role within CANA was to help Anglicans address the growth of Islam. He attended the inaugural Bedford, Texas, assembly of the newly formed Anglican Church in North America in June 2009, where he called for the ACNA to "recognize the challenge of resurgent Islam" and to seek to convert Muslims. He also warned that Muslims in the United States and Europe had "successfully strategized to infiltrate the church and win the loyalty and trust of large numbers of churchgoers." In September 2009, Dobbs warned about an effort to "Islamize American society and replace the Bible with the Koran." Dobbs continued to speak publicly on Islam and Christian persecution. In 2010, he warned about advocacy for sharia law, and in 2014, he spoke at an In Defense of Christians conference alongside Cardinal Donald Wuerl, Ted Cruz and James Zogby.

== Episcopal ministry ==
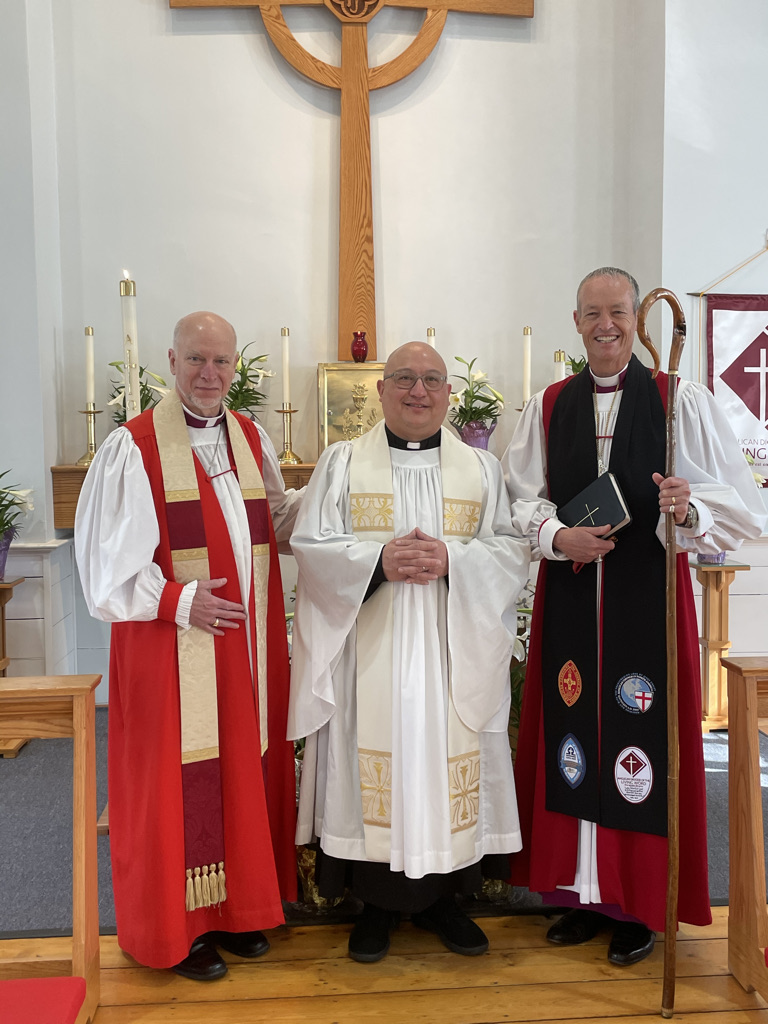
Dobbs (right) and Bishop William H. Love (left) with priest Jay Cayangyang at Bishop Seabury Anglican Church in 2021

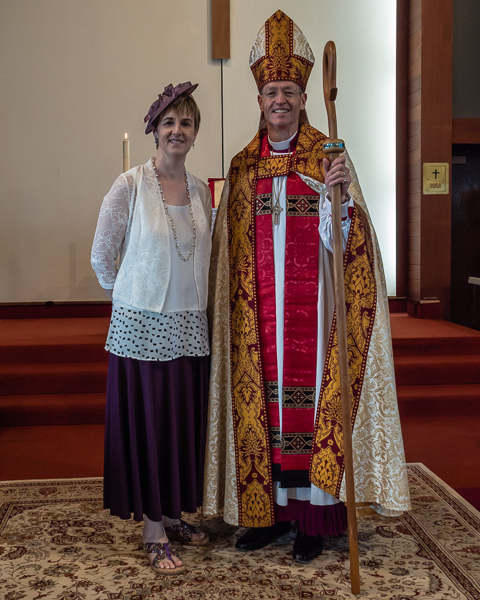
Brenda and Julian Dobbs at the 2018 synod of the Diocese of CANA East

When the CANA-aligned Anglican District of Virginia was forming itself into the ACNA's Diocese of the Mid-Atlantic in 2011, Dobbs was a candidate to be its first bishop; John Guernsey was elected. Later that year, Dobbs was made a bishop of the Church of Nigeria to serve in CANA. He was consecrated alongside Felix Orji by CON Primate Nicholas Okoh in Lagos on September 25.

In 2013, CANA formed itself into three regional dioceses that were to be members of both the CON and the ACNA. Dobbs became the first bishop of the newly formed Missionary Diocese of CANA East. At the time CANA East was formed, Dobbs said the ACNA's goal was to receive recognition as a province of the Anglican Communion.

In 2019, CANA East chose to be solely an ACNA diocese. It renamed itself the Anglican Diocese of the Living Word with Dobbs continuing on as diocesan bishop. As bishop of the ADLW, Dobbs continued to have a public profile, issuing warnings about Islamic intolerance of other faiths and being labeled by conservative author Rod Dreher as "the based bishop" after Dobbs invited Dreher to address the ADLW annual synod.

== ACNA leadership ==
In 2024, newly elected ACNA Archbishop Steve Wood appointed Dobbs to as chair of the Global Mission and International Relations Task Force for the ACNA. Dobbs traveled to Israel and the West Bank to meet with Jewish communities, Palestinian Christians and families affected by the October 7 attacks on Israel.

In November 2025, in the wake of canonical charges against Wood involving sexual harassment, abuse of power and plagiarism, Wood took a leave of absence. Bishop Ray Sutton, the ACNA's provincial dean, would have stepped in as interim leader of the ACNA, but he resigned shortly after Wood took a leave of absence, and Dobbs was appointed to fill Sutton's role as dean and thus acting archbishop. With the consent of the ACNA's five senior bishops following the recusal of Sutton, Dobbs inhibited Wood from ordained ministry pending an ecclesiastical trial. Dobbs announced the following month that a board of inquiry had indicted Wood and that the suspended archbishop would be tried before the ACNA's Court for a Trial of a Bishop.

In February 2026, Dobbs sued the former bishop of the ACNA's Special Jurisdiction of the Armed Forces and Chaplaincy (SJAFC), Derek Jones, for defamation. Dobbs alleged that Jones—who was at that time awaiting trial in an ACNA ecclesiastical court—had repeatedly made false public statements about Dobbs' Barnabas Fund expenses and Dobbs' handling of chaplaincy funds when he was head of CANA, which the ACNA's chaplaincy jurisdiction was part of at the time. In an interview with The Washington Post in December 2025, Jones accused Dobbs of "absconding" with nearly $48,000 of funds the SJAFC had earmarked to support CANA operation, which Dobbs denied. According to documents disclosed as part of the litigation, the sum that Jones was concerned about was $3,750, and CANA East's chancellor said that CANA and CANA East had combined bank accounts but that funds for different purposes were kept in separate ledgers. According to then-Archbishop Beach, an investigation found the charges to be without merit.

== Personal life ==
Dobbs has been married to Brenda Dobbs since 1991. They have three children. Brenda Dobbs was ordained as a priest in the Diocese of Nelson in 2001 and assisted her husband in Bishopdale. The Dobbses have become naturalized American citizens. As of 2025, they lived in Manassas, Virginia.

Religious titles
Preceded by Martyn Minns	Missionary Bishop of CANA; 2014–2019	Succeeded by Felix Orji
New title	Bishop of the Diocese of the Living Word; 2013–present	Incumbent
Preceded by Ray Sutton	Dean of the Anglican Church in North America; 2025–present	Incumbent
