= Felix Orji =

American Anglican bishop (born 1962)

The Right Reverend Felix Orji OSB
- Bishop of All Nations
- Church: Anglican Church in North America
- Diocese: All Nations
- In office: 2013–present

Orders
- Ordination: 1996 (priesthood) by Michael Ingham
- Consecration: September 25, 2011 by Nicholas Okoh

Personal details
- Born: Felix Clarence Orji; 1962 (age 63–64) Nigeria
- Education: University of Ife; University of Lagos; Vancouver School of Theology; Regent College; Gordon-Conwell Theological Seminary

Felix Clarence Orji OSB (born 1962) is a Nigerian-born American Anglican bishop. A former Episcopal priest who left the Episcopal Church as part of the Anglican realignment, Orji was consecrated a bishop in Nigeria in 2011 to serve the Convocation of Anglicans in North America. Since 2013, he has been the diocesan bishop of the Anglican Diocese of All Nations (formerly the Anglican Diocese of the West), which was a dual member of both the Church of Nigeria and the Anglican Church in North America from 2013 to 2019, a member of the Church of Nigeria North American Mission from 2019 to 2022, and a sole member of the ACNA since 2022.

== Early life, family, and education ==
Orji became a Christian as a teenager growing up in Nigeria. He received a B.A. from the University of Ife in Ile-Ife, Nigeria, and a master's degree from the University of Lagos. Orji moved to Vancouver to study for ordained ministry, earning an M.Div. from the Vancouver School of Theology and a diploma in Christian studies from Regent College. In 2004, Orji received a D.Min. from Gordon-Conwell Theological Seminary.

While in Canada, in 1996, Orji was ordained in the Anglican Diocese of New Westminster. He served a curacy at All Saints Anglican Church in Burnaby and then became associate rector of St. John's Shaughnessy in Vancouver. Orji also married Lilian Siew Yee; they have four children.

== Ordained ministry ==
In 2002, after the New Westminster synod controversially approved the blessing of same-sex unions, the St. John's Shaughnessy delegates, along with delegates from seven other churches, walked out of synod in objection, eventually forming a group called the Anglican Communion in New Westminster (ACiNW) and declared impaired communion with bishop Michael Ingham. Orji, who was a member of the faith, worship and ministry committee task group asked to present the same-sex blessing issue to the Anglican Church of Canada's 2004 General Synod, said at the time that St. John's was not yet willing to abandon the reconciliation process. "I am not going to leave the Anglican Church of Canada, St. John’s is not going to leave and most of the ACiNW parishes will not leave, no matter what happens," he said. However, Orji warned that if Ingham "doesn’t hold off [same sex blessings until the General Synod] there will be chaos. People are angry on both sides." However, the first same-sex blessing took place in the diocese in May 2003, and the majority of members at St. John's and other dissident parishes eventually left the ACC, forming the Anglican Network in Canada and the Anglican Church in North America.

In 2004, after the General Synod met, Orji accepted a call as associate rector of St. Francis on the Hill Episcopal Church in El Paso, Texas. In 2008, Orji was appointed rector of St. Francis, serving until 2015. Under Orji's leadership, the 400-member church voted in 2008 to leave the Diocese of the Rio Grande and affiliate with the Convocation of Anglicans in North America. In 2011, Orji and Episcopal Bishop Michael Vono settled litigation over ownership of the property, with St. Francis Anglican Church vacating its property and moving to a new location. Until 2010, Orji was coordinator of the Anglican Fellowship of the Southwest, which was the forerunner organization of the Diocese of the Southwest.

== Episcopacy ==
In 2011, Orji was elected a suffragan bishop for CANA. He was consecrated by Church of Nigeria Primate Nicholas Okoh alongside fellow CANA Bishop Julian Dobbs on September 25, 2011, at the Archbishop Vining Memorial Church Cathedral in Lagos. In 2013, churches remaining in CANA were divided into three dioceses, with Orji becoming diocesan bishop of CANA West. St. Francis became the diocese's cathedral, and Orji stepped down as dean in 2016 so that he could focus full-time on his episcopal ministry. Orji is also bishop protector of the Society of St. Benedict, a dispersed Benedictine order in the Diocese of All Nations.

In 2019, conflict arose between the CON and ACNA leadership. That January, the CON bishops elected four suffragan bishops to serve in the Missionary Diocese of the Trinity, but this election was not submitted to the ACNA college of bishops for consent according to ACNA's canons, with the result that the four bishops, upon consecration, would not be seated in the ACNA. The election of the bishops was also not done in consultation with CANA's missionary bishop, Julian Dobbs, or Orji. Dobbs and Orji commented at the time: "This does not directly affect the mission and ministry of the other CANA dioceses. While we are disappointed by the way this election process has unfolded, this is not a situation that affects our local parishes and their commitment to making disciples and followers of Jesus."

Amid the controversy, the dual ACNA-CON jurisdiction came to an end. CANA West, which was composed of a mixture of Nigerian and Anglo-American adherents, and the Missionary Diocese of the Trinity, which was primarily composed of Nigerian immigrants, remained in the Church of Nigeria.

In October 2020, CANA was replaced as a corporate entity by CONNAM (with the two constituent dioceses of the West and the Trinity), and Orji was designated CONNAM's coordinating bishop. CON Primate Henry Ndukuba joined Orji to dedicate the diocese's new cathedral in Houston in 2021. In 2021, Ojri opposed the ordination of women to Holy Orders, as deacons, priests, or bishops.

In October 2022, new CONNAM bylaws were released, signaling the permanent establishment of CONNAM as an alternative Anglican jurisdiction in the United States and Canada. In response, Orji announced his departure from CONNAM. In leaving, he said "I’m no longer able to be part of a mission that violates my conscience and understanding of Godly Christian ministry and mission in North America" and added that "CoN made a promise to relinquish its mission to a new orthodox Anglican body when it emerges. . . . We should not do things simply because we want to do so and because we don’t want to be under 'white people' or the cheap blackmail that 'ACNA will/might bless same-sex unions in the future.' Nobody knows in the future or what we ourselves will do in the future. . . . It is a horrible thing to imply of our GAFCON partner." Ndukuba suspended Orji from ministry, stating that he "deeply regrets the recent public utterances and actions of Bishop Orji against the authority of the Church of Nigeria."

ACNA received Orji and Diocese of All Nations Suffragan Bishop Scott Seely into the college of bishops, and the diocese voted to affiliate with ACNA, although some congregations elected to remain in CONNAM. Two months after his suspension, Ndukuba lifted the suspension and released Orji for service in the ACNA.

== Bibliography ==
- Orji, Felix Clarence (2013). Moral Leadership in the Church: A Normative Approach. Bloomington, Indiana: WestBow Press. ISBN 9781449794712.

Anglican Communion titles
Preceded by Position created	I Bishop of the West/All Nations; 2013–present	Incumbent
Preceded by Julian Dobbs	CANA/CONNAM Coordinating Bishop; 2019–2022	Succeeded by Nathan Kanu interim
