= Anglican Diocese of All Nations =

Anglican missionary diocese

Location
- Ecclesiastical province: Anglican Church in North America

Statistics
- Parishes: 27 (2025)
- Members: 1,758 (2025)

Information
- Rite: Anglican
- Cathedral: Christ Church, El Paso

Current leadership
- Bishop: Felix Orji
- Suffragan: Scott Seely

Website
- www.adoan.org

The Anglican Diocese of All Nations (formerly known as the Missionary Diocese of CANA West and the Anglican Diocese of the West) is a diocese of the Anglican Church in North America and formerly of the Church of Nigeria North American Mission. It was one of the four missionary dioceses of the Convocation of Anglicans in North America, which was founded in 2005. As such, it had a dual identity as a church body of the ACNA and the Church of Nigeria in the United States, until May 2019.

The diocesan office and the Anglican Cathedral Church of St. Francis are both located in El Paso, Texas. The first bishop is Nigerian-born Felix Orji. Scott Seely is the suffragan bishop.

== History ==
CANA West was launched as a diocese-in-formation of the ACNA in June 2012 and achieved full diocesan status at the 5th Provincial Council held at Nashotah House, Nashotah, Wisconsin, from 16–18 June 2013. The first diocesan synod was held from 15–17 August 2013 in San Antonio, Texas. The diocese is widespread across a large part of the United States and one of its main purposes is church planting.

The ACNA and the Church of Nigeria signed an agreement that stated that the three dioceses that have resulted from the Convocation of Anglicans in North America activity in the United States could decide their own filiation in any of both churches, on 12 March 2019. This agreement was the result of the election of four suffragan bishops for the Missionary Diocese of the Trinity, composed mostly of Nigerian expatriates in the United States, by the Church of Nigeria, without the consultation of the ACNA College of Bishops. Until then all the three dioceses were members of both churches. The Missionary Diocese of CANA East announced on 21 May 2019 their decision to withdraw membership in the Church of Nigeria to become solely a diocese of the Anglican Church in North America, with the name of Anglican Diocese of the Living Word. The Missionary Diocese of CANA West also announced its withdrawal from ACNA to become a diocese of the Church of Nigeria on 23 May 2019, followed by the Missionary Diocese of the Trinity on the same day. Both dioceses remained as ministry partners of ACNA.

In October 2022, new CONNAM bylaws were released, signaling the permanent establishment of CONNAM as an alternative Anglican jurisdiction in the United States and Canada. In response, Orji announced his departure from CONNAM. In leaving, he said “I’m no longer able to be part of a mission that violates my conscience and understanding of Godly Christian ministry and mission in North America" and added that "CoN made a promise to relinquish its mission to a new orthodox Anglican body when it emerges." CON Primate Henry Ndukuba suspended Orji from ministry, stating that he "deeply regrets the recent public utterances and actions of Bishop Orji against the authority of the Church of Nigeria."

ACNA received Orji and Seely into the college of bishops, and the Diocese of the West voted to affiliate with ACNA, although some congregations elected to remain in CONNAM. Ndukuba appointed the Diocese of the West's other suffragan, Celestine Ironna, to oversee congregations remaining with CONNAM on an interim basis. In 2023, the diocese changed its name to the Anglican Diocese of All Nations.

In 2025, the Diocese of All Nations reported 27 congregations (down 15.5% from 2022), membership of 1,758 (down 20.9% from 2022) and average Sunday attendance of 1,111 (down 37% from 2022).
