= Onyia =

Onyia is a surname. Notable people with the surname include:

- Christian Onyia (fl. 2019), Nigerian bishop
- Josephine Onyia (born 1986), Nigerian-born Spanish athlete
