= Shaari Zedek Synagogue =

Synagogue in Brooklyn, New York

St. Leonard's Anglican Church
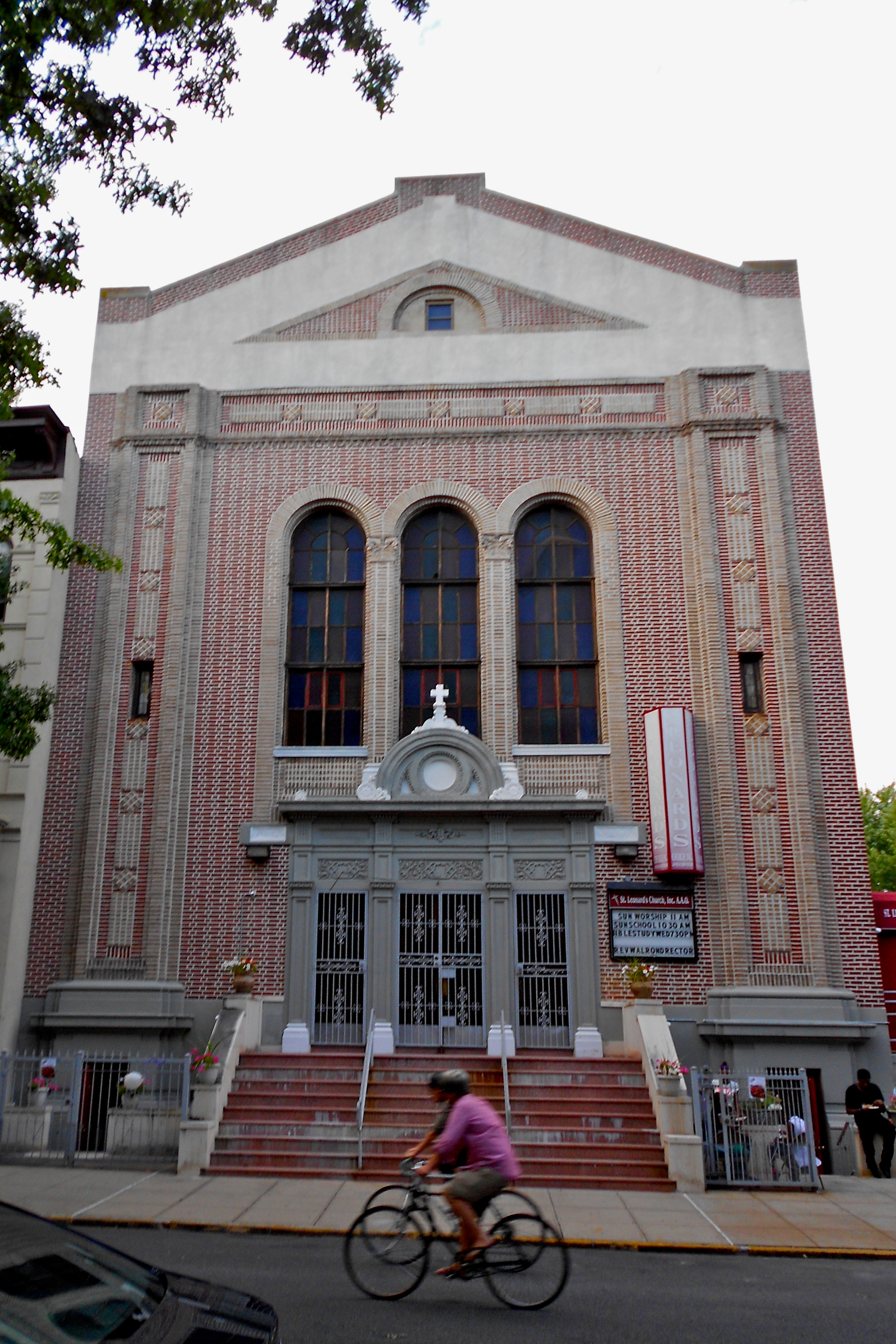
- St. Leonard's Anglican Church
- Location: Brooklyn, New York
- Country: United States
- Denomination: Anglican Church in North America
- Website: www.stleonardsbrooklyn.org

History
- Status: Synagogue (1909–1944); Church (from 1944)
- Founded: 1936

Administration
- Diocese: Living Word

Clergy
- Priest: The Rev. Mark Kiesel
- Shaari Zedek Synagogue
- U.S. National Register of Historic Places
- Location within New York City Location within New York Location within the United States
- Location: 767 Putnam Avenue, Brooklyn, New York
- Coordinates: 40°41′11.19″N 73°55′51.24″W
- Area: less than one acre
- Built: 1909
- Architect: Eugene Schoen
- Architectural style: Neoclassical
- NRHP reference No.: 09000968
- Added to NRHP: December 4, 2009

St. Leonard's Anglican Church, previously known as Shaari Zedek Synagogue and Congregation Achavat Achim, is a historic synagogue and church building in the Bedford–Stuyvesant neighborhood of Brooklyn, New York. Built in 1909–1910, the building served as a synagogue until 1944, when it was bought by an Afro-Caribbean church in the Anglican tradition. The building has been listed on the National Register of Historic Places since 2009.

== History ==
=== Use as a synagogue (1910–1944) ===
The late 19th and early 20th centuries saw a substantial influx of Eastern European Jewish immigrants in Bedford-Stuyvesant. In 1902, new residents of Stuyvesant Heights who were members of Congregation Shaare Zedek of New York organized a new English-speaking synagogue by the same name. The synagogue was self-described as "conservative", blending Orthodoxy and Reform Judaism, with men and women sitting together and men wearing hats but prayer shawls being optional. Its first building was located on Quincy Street, but in 1909, the congregation commissioned Eugene Schoen to design a building at 767 Putnam Avenue.

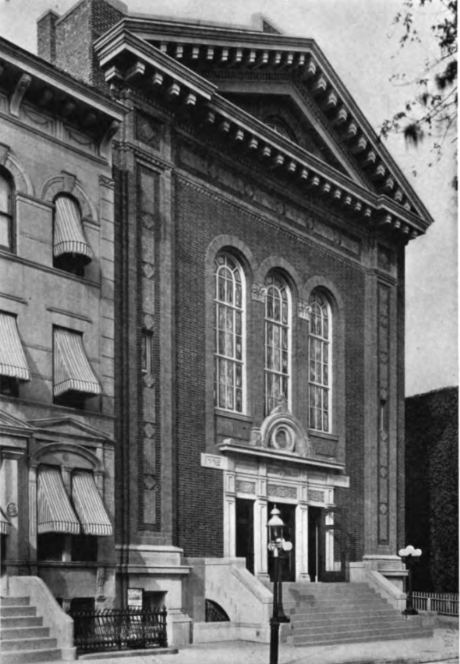
The exterior of Shaari Zedek Synagogue upon construction with the original pediment pictured.

The new building was dedicated on September 25, 1910. However, Shaari Zedek's growth continued, becoming New York City's largest Conservative synagogue. In 1924, the synagogue left Putnam Avenue for a new and larger building at Kingston Avenue and Park Place in Brooklyn. The new facility—which Shaari Zedek occupied until 1969 and is now an Afro-Caribbean church—included space for Shabbat services, Sunday school, a dance hall and a gymnasium. President Calvin Coolidge participated in the dedication by pushing a button at the White House that caused the new building's electric lights to illuminate.

In 1924, Shaari Zedek sold its building to an older Conservative Brooklyn synagogue named Achavat Achim, a branch of Brooklyn's first synagogue, Beth Elohim. Achavat Achim owned the building until 1944, when—amid demographic changes in Bedford-Stuyvesant that saw it become heavily African-American—it sold the building to an Afro-Caribbean church in the Anglican tradition named St. Leonard's.

=== Use by St. Leonard's (1944–present) ===
St. Leonard's was founded by a couple dozen Afro-Caribbean immigrants—primarily Barbadians but also Antiguans and Trinidadians—in Brooklyn in 1936. “St Leonard’s was formed mainly by Barbadians who were Anglicans but who weren’t welcome by the Episcopal Church. It was systemic racism at work," according to longtime St. Leonard's rector Trevor Bentley. The congregation eventually became part of the Afro-American Orthodox Church, not aligned with the Anglican Communion, under the leadership of Archbishop Donald M. Forster, who was a founding member of St. Leonard's and its rector from 1950 until his death in 1975.

At some point after Forster's death, the intercommunion with the Afro-American Orthodox Church ended. St. Leonard's later joined the Convocation of Anglicans in North America and, through it, the Anglican Church in North America.

== Architecture ==
According to the National Register of Historic Places nomination form, "while St. Leonard’s Church made a few modifications to the former synagogue after acquiring it in 1944, the building retains integrity of location, design, setting, materials, workmanship, feeling, and association."

=== Exterior ===
From Putnam Street, St. Leonard's appears as a two-story building faced in brick with trim in cast stone. The design combines classical motifs with abstract geometric patterns of rectangles, squares and diamonds. On the first story, a wide central double door is flanked on each side by a single door separated by pilasters supporting an attic and architrave. Three identical tall, arched stained-glass windows sit directly above the entrance, linked as an arcade by cast stone capitals. The full façade has a large pilaster on either site, above which is an entablature and frieze. An original cast stone pediment has been removed from above the entablature and replaced with stucco. The plain eastern side, facing an accessibility ramp, features five bays with tall arched windows to the sanctuary's balcony.

=== Interior ===
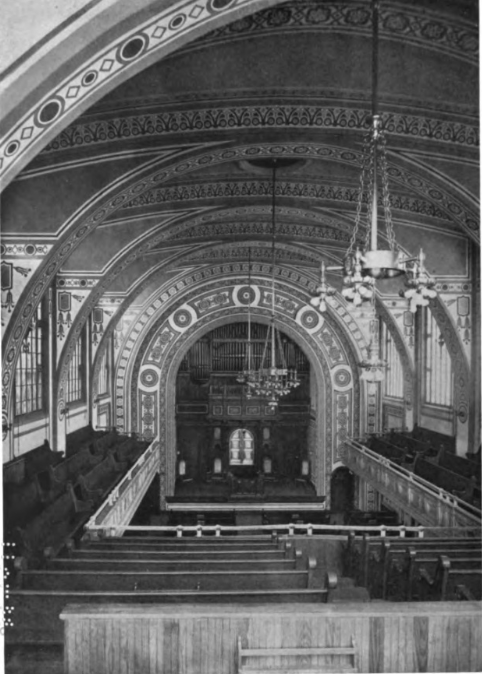
The interior of the synagogue, facing the ark from the balcony and showing the series of arches.

Inside the main entrance is a shallow vestibule. Five arches divide the vestibule into five bays, with three entrances to the sanctuary in the three middle bays. The mosaic floors include a Star of David inscribed in the center. The sanctuary is framed by a series of rounded arches stretching side-to-side, suggesting a barrel vault. At the end of the sanctuary, an ornamental arch frames a recessed area that housed the ark when the building was a synagogue. Roundels on this arch with abstract ornamentation have been redecorated with Christian symbols. The altar is located in this recessed area on a platform surmounted by a pipe organ.

On each side, the sanctuary is divided by the arches into five bays, each with a tall round-arched stained glass window. A balcony rings the sanctuary on three sides. The sanctuary is illuminated by an original metal chandelier adorned with Star of David motifs. A social hall and kitchen is located in the basement.

== Churchmanship ==
As of the 2010s, St. Leonard's remained strongly influenced by Barbadian Anglicanism and followed high church practices.
