= Scott Seely =

American Anglican bishop (born 1981)

The Right Reverend Scott Seely
- Bishop Suffragan of All Nations
- Church: Anglican Church in North America
- Diocese: All Nations

Orders
- Ordination: 2009 (diaconate); 2010 (presbyterate)
- Consecration: March 20, 2020 by Nicholas Okoh

Personal details
- Born: 1981 (age 44–45)

Scott Andrew Seely (born 1981) is an American Anglican bishop and musician. Consecrated in 2020 in the Church of Nigeria North American Mission (CONNAM), he currently serves as bishop suffragan of the Anglican Diocese of All Nations in the Anglican Church in North America.

== Early life and education ==
Seely is a native Texan. He received his B.A. in church music from Texas Lutheran University in 2003, his M.A. in theology from the Master's Seminary in 2007, his M.Div. from Trinity School for Ministry in 2010, and his D.Min. in congregational development from Nashotah House in 2019. Prior to his ordination, Seely was youth minister in San Antonio and a music minister in Bulverde, Texas.

== Ordained ministry ==
Seely was ordained in CONNAM's predecessor entity, the Convocation of Anglicans in North America. In 2010, Seely planted and became rector of Three Streams Anglican Church in San Antonio, Texas. In 2022, he planted Church of the Redeemer in New Braunfels, Texas. He was appointed canon for church planting in the Diocese of CANA West in 2013 and made an archdeacon in 2016.

== Episcopacy ==
In 2020, Seely was elected a suffragan bishop by the Church of Nigeria's house of bishops, and consecrated by Nicholas Okoh at Holy Trinity Cathedral in Lokoja, Nigeria, on March 20, 2020. In October 2022, new CONNAM bylaws were released, signaling the permanent establishment of CONNAM as an alternative Anglican jurisdiction in the United States and Canada. In response, the Anglican Diocese of the West voted to depart from the Church of Nigeria. The ACNA received Seely and Felix Orji into its college of bishops, and the Diocese of the West voted to affiliate with ACNA to become the Anglican Diocese of All Nations, although some congregations elected to remain in CONNAM.

== Discography ==
On May 1, 2025, Seely released the album, The Hope of Spring, that he recorded while on sabbatical in 2024
