= Anglican Diocese of the Trinity =

Anglican diocese in North America

Location
- Ecclesiastical province: Church of Nigeria

Statistics
- Parishes: 36

Information
- Rite: Anglican
- Cathedral: Anglican Cathedral of the Resurrection, Indianapolis

Current leadership
- Bishop: The Rt. Rev. Dr. Olukayode Adebogun

Website
- adott.org

The Anglican Diocese of the Trinity (ADOTT) is a diocese of the Church of Nigeria and formerly of the Anglican Church in North America and a sub-jurisdiction of the Convocation of Anglicans in North America (CANA). It is the first missionary diocese of CANA launched by the Church of Nigeria in the United States and Canada, working as an evangelical church planting movement.

== History ==
The Church of Nigeria started within the Convocation of Anglicans in North America (CANA) in 2005 with the purpose of providing a home for orthodox and charismatic Anglicanism. CANA ministers have proclaimed a more charismatic worship style than has been typical in Episcopal churches. CANA became one of the founding jurisdictions of ACNA in June 2009. In 2010, CANA divided into several districts, including the Missionary District of the Trinity. Martyn Minns, Missionary Bishop of CANA at the time, presented to the General Synod of the Church of Nigeria that the Missionary District of the Trinity should become the Missionary Diocese of the Trinity, which was affirmed on September 23, 2011.

The inauguration of the diocese took place on August 19, 2012, at the Anglican Church of the Resurrection in Indianapolis, Indiana. Present were Nicholas Okoh, Primate of Nigeria, and Robert Duncan, Primate of the ACNA. The diocese was later renamed the Anglican Diocese of the Trinity. In 2014, Julian Dobbs was named the Missionary Bishop of CANA. Archbishop Okoh affirmed that the ADOTT was a CANA diocese and thus part of the ACNA without direct relation to Nigeria. He directed that the constitution and canons of ADOTT be brought into conformity with the ACNA.

The ACNA and the Church of Nigeria signed an agreement that stated that the three dioceses that have resulted from the Convocation of Anglicans in North America activity in the United States, could decide their own filiation in any of both churches, on 12 March 2019. This agreement was the result of the election of four suffragan bishops for the Missionary Diocese of the Trinity, composed mostly of Nigerian expatriates in the United States, by the Church of Nigeria, without the consultation of the ACNA College of Bishops. Until then all the three dioceses were members of both churches. The Missionary Diocese of CANA East announced on 21 May 2019 their decision to withdraw membership in the Church of Nigeria to become solely a diocese of the Anglican Church in North America, with the name of Anglican Diocese of the Living Word. The Missionary Diocese of CANA West also announced its withdrawal from ACNA to become a diocese of the Church of Nigeria on 23 May 2019, followed by the Missionary Diocese of the Trinity on the same day. Both dioceses remain as ministry partners of ACNA.

The majority of churches are culturally Nigerian and other African nationalities but are open to people from any ethnicity.

The four suffragan bishops elected in 2019 were: Adedokun Adewunmi in Region 3; Martyn Anagbogu in Region 2; Olukayode Adebogun in Region 1; and Augustin Unuigbe in Region 4. At the episcopal synod of the Church of Nigeria (Anglican Communion), held on September 23, 2021, the Rt. Rev. Olukayode Adebogun was elected the second diocesan bishop of the Anglican Diocese of the Trinity to replace the retired Bishop Amos Fagbamiye (who retired in March 2021 at age 72). He was enthroned as the diocesan bishop on November 20, 2021.

== Structure ==
The diocese is divided into twelve archdeaconries and districts led by archdeacons, Eight in the United States and four in Canada. These archdeaconry represent thirty five American states and 10 Canadian provinces. The diocese comprises 80 parishes: 65 in the United States and twenty five in Canada. The diocesan bishop is Olukayode Adebogun.
