= Nathan Kanu =

Anglican bishop in Nigeria (born 1966)

Nathan Chinenye Okechukwu Kanu (born, March 7, 1966) is an Anglican bishop in Nigeria. He is the current Bishop of Aba Ngwa North, one of nine within the Anglican Province of Aba, itself one of 14 provinces within the Church of Nigeria.

Kanu was born in Obegu. He was educated at Mgboko Umuanunu School and Trinity Theological College, Umuahia. He was ordained in 1995. He served at Eziukwu Aba and Amano in Abia State. He then continued his ministry in Oklahoma and California. In 2007 Kanu was elected a Suffragan Bishop of the Convocation of Anglicans in North America. In 2009 he was translated to Aba Ngwa North, after the death of the pioneer bishop John Ezirim.

In 2022, after Felix Orji left the Church of Nigeria North American Mission for the Anglican Church in North America, Kanu was appointed interim coordinating bishop of CONNAM.

== Notes ==
Anglican Communion titles
Preceded by John Ezirim	Bishop of Aba Ngwa North; 2009–present	Incumbent
Preceded by Felix Orji	CONNAM Coordinating Bishop interim 2022–present	Incumbent
