= Christian Onyia =

Anglican bishop in Nigeria

Christian Onyia is an Anglican bishop in Nigeria: he is the current Bishop of Nike.

He was consecrated Bishop of Nike in April 2019 at St David's Anglican Cathedral Church, Ijomu, Akure, by the Primate of All Nigeria, Nicholas Okoh.
