= Anglican Diocese of Gombe =

Anglican diocese in Nigeria

Diocese of Gombe
- Incumbent; Cletus Ajigben Tambari

Location
- Country: Nigeria
- Ecclesiastical province: Jos

Statistics
- Churches: 100+

Information
- First holder: Henry Ndukuba
- Established: 1999

The Anglican Diocese of Gombe is one of ten dioceses within the Anglican Province of Jos, itself one of 14 ecclesiastical provinces within the Church of Nigeria. The current bishop is the Right Rev. Cletus Tambari, who replaced Henry Ndukuba, formerly Archbishop of Jos and now Primate of the Church of Nigeria.

The Diocese of Gombe was created as a missionary diocese and the 71st diocese of the Church of Nigeria Anglican Communion. It is located in the North Eastern part of Nigeria. It was created in 1999 and now has more than a hundred churches and eight Archdeaconries.
