= Bishop Seabury Anglican Church =

Anglican church in Gales Ferry, Connecticut, United States

Coordinates: 41°25′42″N 72°05′00″W

- formerly the Gales Ferry Methodist Church
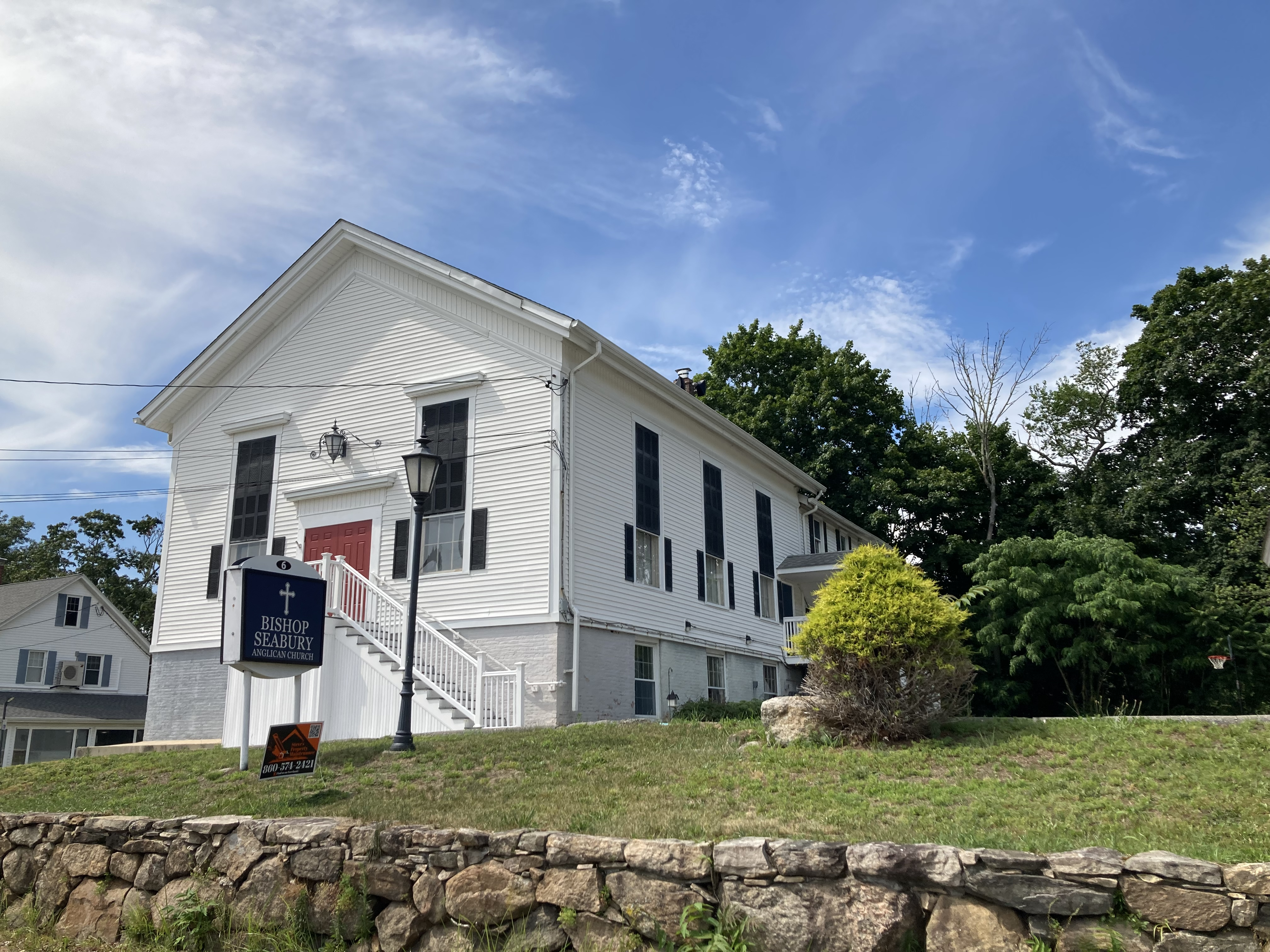
- Bishop Seabury Church in 2025.
- Location: Gales Ferry, Connecticut
- Country: United States
- Denomination: Anglican Church in North America
- Previous denomination: Episcopal Church
- Website: www.bishopseabury.org

History
- Founded: 1875
- Dedicated: 1857

Architecture
- Style: Vernacular

Administration
- Diocese: Living Word

Clergy
- Rector: The Ven. Tucker Messamore
- Gales Ferry Methodist Church
- U.S. Historic district – Contributing property
- Part of: Gales Ferry Historic District #2 (ID02000865)
- Added to NRHP: August 22, 2002

Bishop Seabury Anglican Church is a historic Anglican church located in Gales Ferry, Ledyard, Connecticut. Founded in Groton in 1875 as part of the Episcopal Diocese of Connecticut and named in honor of Samuel Seabury, the congregation left the Episcopal Church during the Anglican realignment and is now a member of the Anglican Diocese of the Living Word in the Anglican Church in North America. In leaving the Episcopal Church, Bishop Seabury lost in litigation seeking to retain its building, and since 2018 the church has been located in the former Gales Ferry Methodist Church, built in 1857, a contributing property to Gales Ferry Historic District #2.

== History ==
=== Bishop Seabury Church history ===
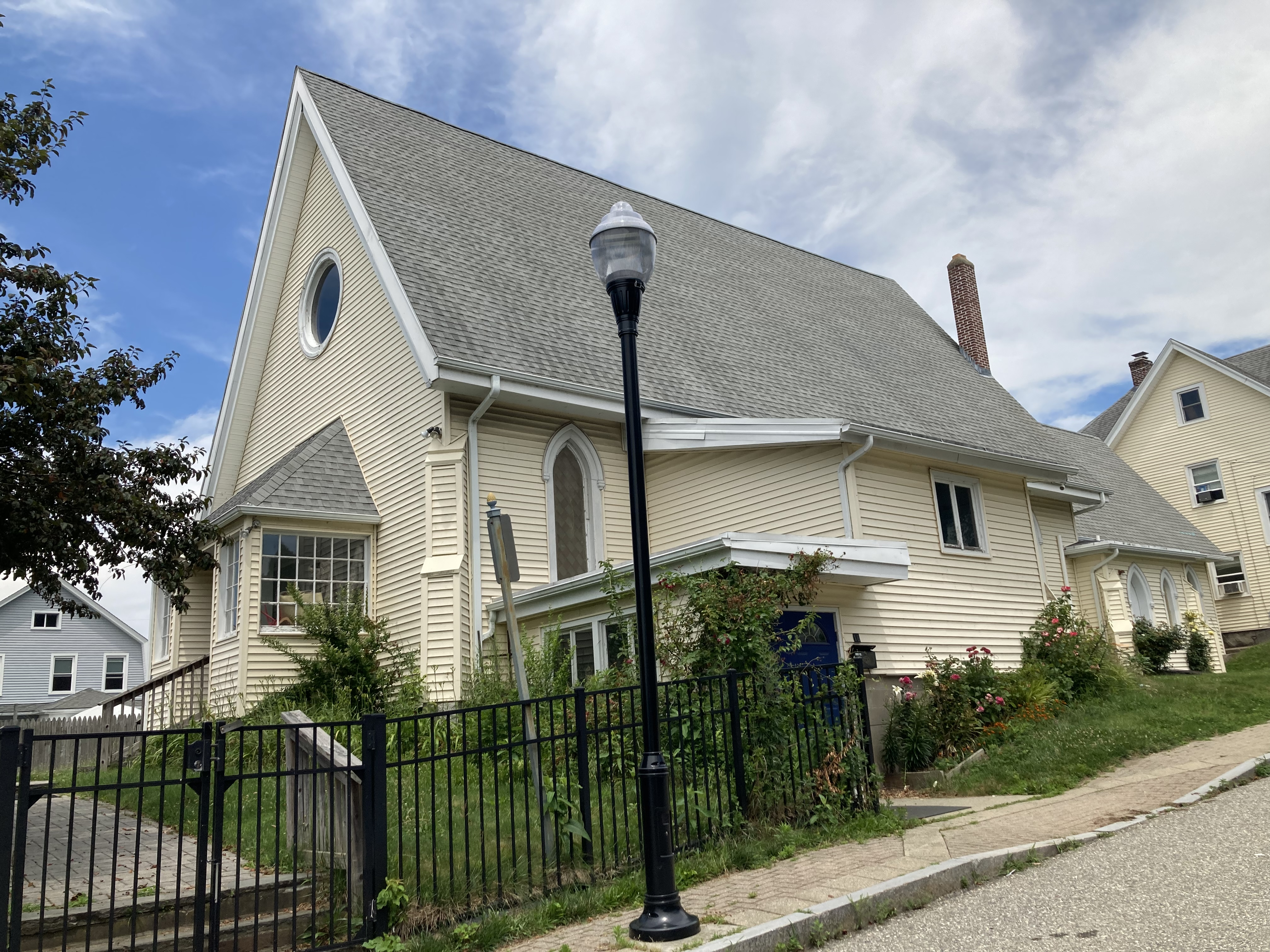
The first building of Bishop Seabury Church on Fort Street is, as of 2025, a mosque.

Bishop Seabury Memorial Church was founded as a mission in Groton in 1874 by the Rev. R. M. Duff, the incumbent at St. James Episcopal Church in New London. Its first building was dedicated in December 1875. The congregation received parochial status in the 1950s during the rectorate of the Rev. Roger Dissell. In the 1960s, the growing church acquired land in suburban Groton and built a modern sanctuary there.

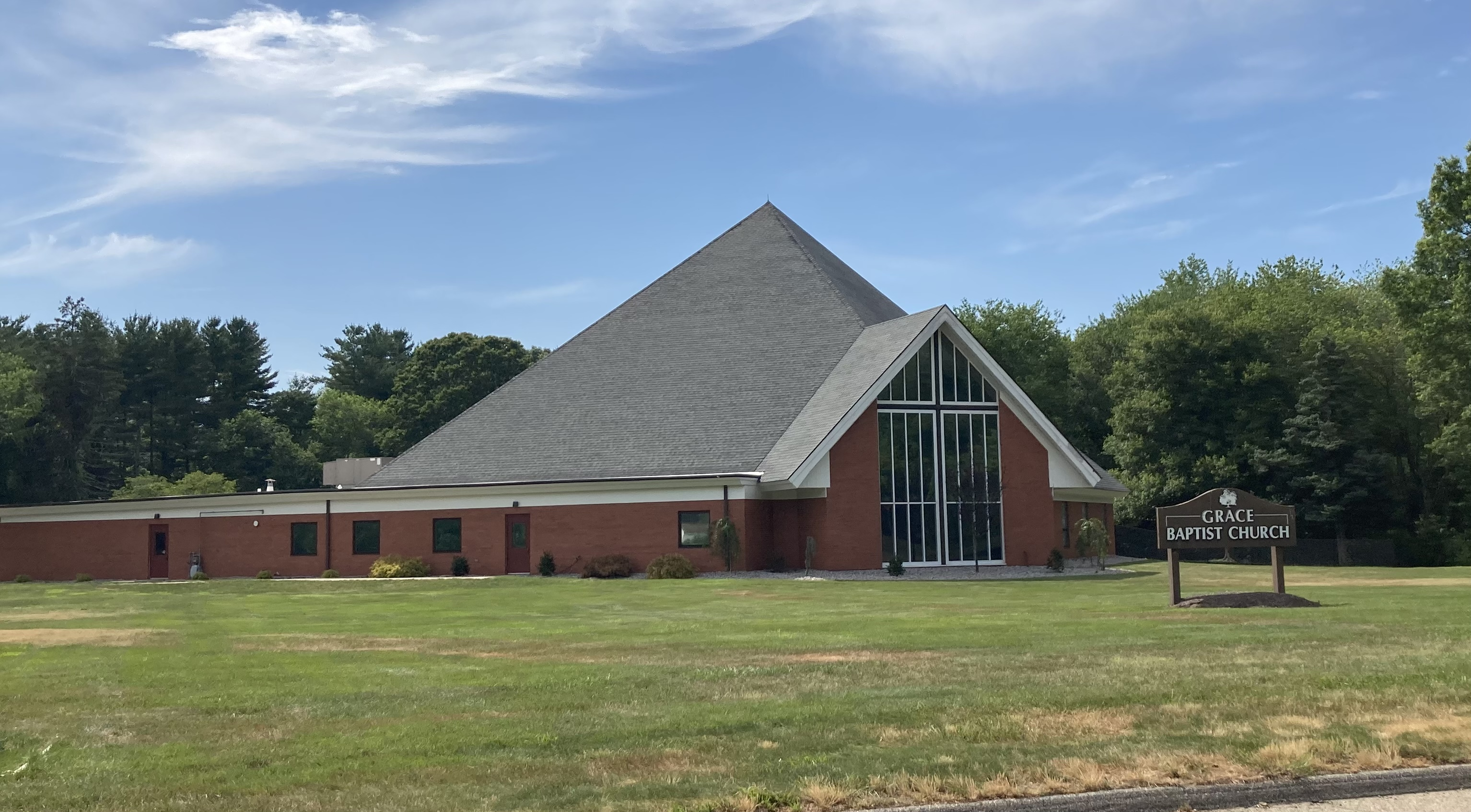
The sanctuary where Bishop Seabury Church worshiped from 1998 to 2012.

The church called the Ven. Ronald Gauss as rector in 1975, and he served for 30 years. Under Gauss, Bishop Seabury grew and became part of the spiritual renewal movement in several Connecticut Episcopal churches. The church also dedicated a new sanctuary in 1998.

In the early 2000s, as part of the Anglican realignment, six of these Connecticut churches, Bishop Seabury among them, sought delegated episcopal pastoral oversight from another bishop. After this request was denied, the congregation of Bishop Seabury voted to leave the Episcopal Church and affiliate with the Church of Nigeria's Convocation of Anglicans in North America. After several years of litigation over ownership of the property, courts ruled for the Diocese of Connecticut, and Bishop Seabury vacated the Groton property in August 2012 and began worshiping in rented space. In 2014, the diocese sold the church building to a Baptist church.

=== History of the building ===
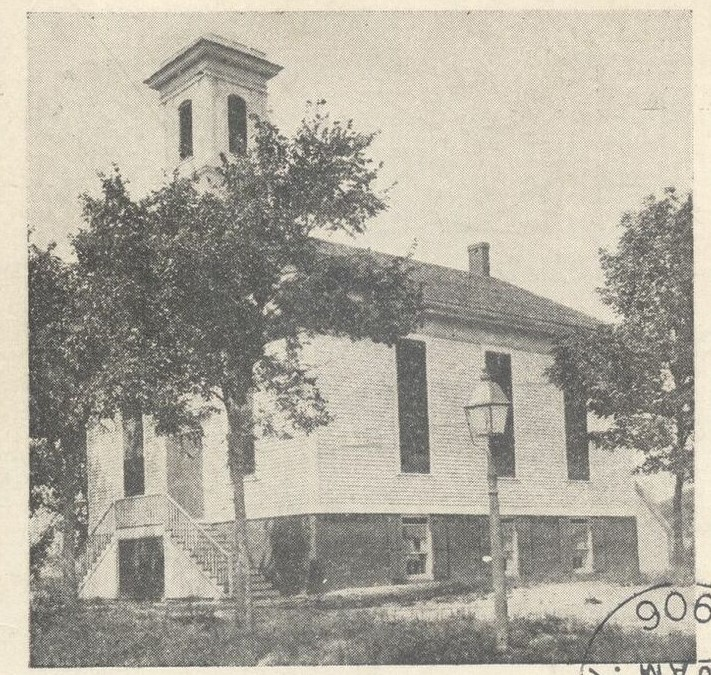
The former Gales Ferry Methodist Church pictured c. 1906.

The Gales Ferry Methodist Church, founded in 1803, built its first building on the present-day site at 6 Hurlbutt Road in 1815. The oldest part of the current building dates to 1857, with the rear addition being built in 1854.

In the 1960s, the Methodist church relocated to a newly constructed facility and the historic church became a funeral home. From 2011 to 2018, the former church housed retail stores.

In 2018, after renting at nearby schools and hotels for several years, Bishop Seabury Anglican Church purchased the building. After renovations under then-rector Jay Cayangyang, it consecrated the space in December 2018.

== Architecture ==
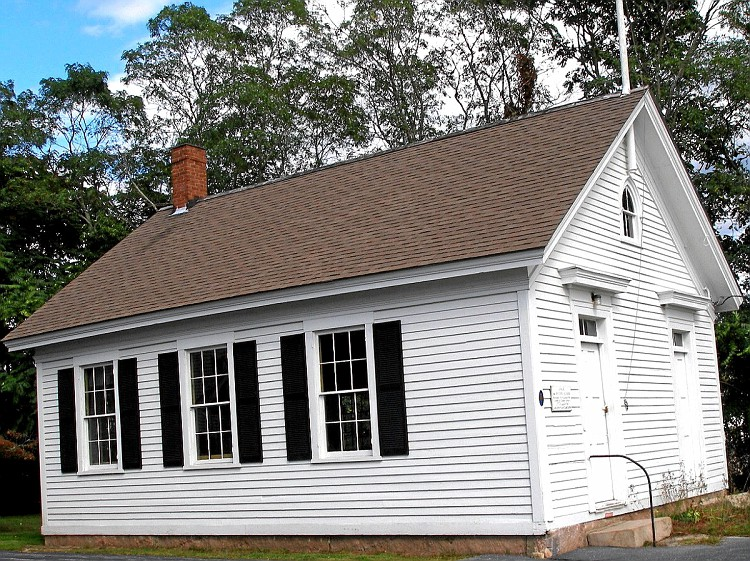
The Old Gales Ferry Schoolhouse adjacent to Bishop Seabury Anglican Church

According to the National Register of Historic Places listing for Gales Ferry Historic District #2, the church is a "tall gable-roofed frame vernacular" structure. Mounted on a high brick foundation, the gable end faces the street. The facade includes two sections, front and rear, each with three bays. A steeple documented in historic photographs no longer exists. The front entrance is approached by a stairway and flanked by tall windows.

A one-room schoolhouse dating to 1868 is also on the church parcel of land; both church and school are contributing properties to the historic district.
