= Anglican Diocese of the Living Word =

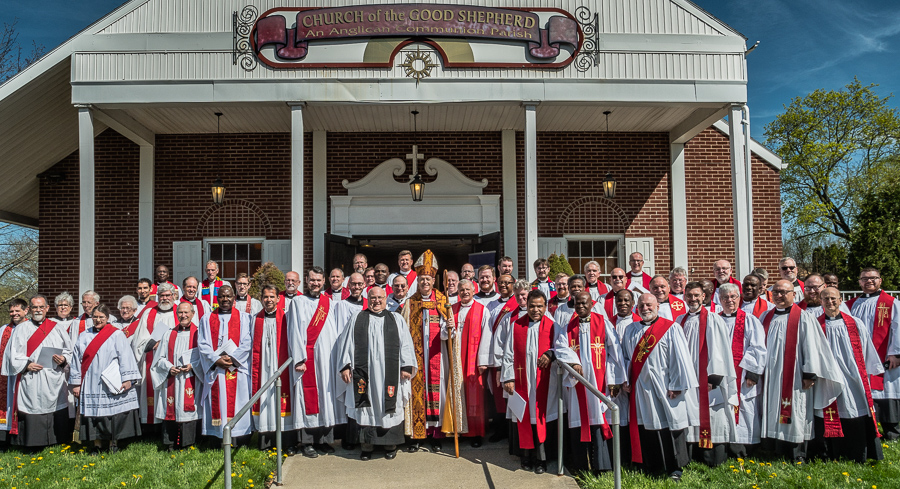
- Clergy gather at the diocesan synod in 2018.

Location
- Ecclesiastical province: Anglican Church in North America

Statistics
- Parishes: 46 (2025)
- Members: 2,610 (2025)

Information
- Rite: Anglican
- Cathedral: Bishop Seabury Anglican Church, Gales Ferry, Connecticut (pro-cathedral)

Current leadership
- Diocesan bishop: Julian Dobbs
- Suffragan: Marc Steele

Website
- adlw.org

The Anglican Diocese of the Living Word, formerly the Missionary Diocese of CANA East, is a diocese of the Anglican Church in North America (ACNA). It was one of the four missionary dioceses of the Convocation of Anglicans in North America, a dual church body of the ACNA and the Church of Nigeria. It is officially a full member diocese of ACNA since June 2013. It comprises 42 congregations in 19 American states, with congregations as far as California and Florida but with most concentrated in the northeastern and mid-Atlantic regions. The diocese is divided into nine archdeaconries: Central New York, the Chesapeake, Long Island, the Mid-Atlantic, the Northeast, northeastern New York, the Ohio Valley, the South and the Midwest. The diocese also sponsors a mission in Haiti that includes nine additional congregations. The diocesan office is located at McLean, Virginia. The diocese also includes two affiliated religious communities: the Franciscan Brothers of Bucksport and the Community of St. Mary (East) in New York.

== Theology and churchmanship ==
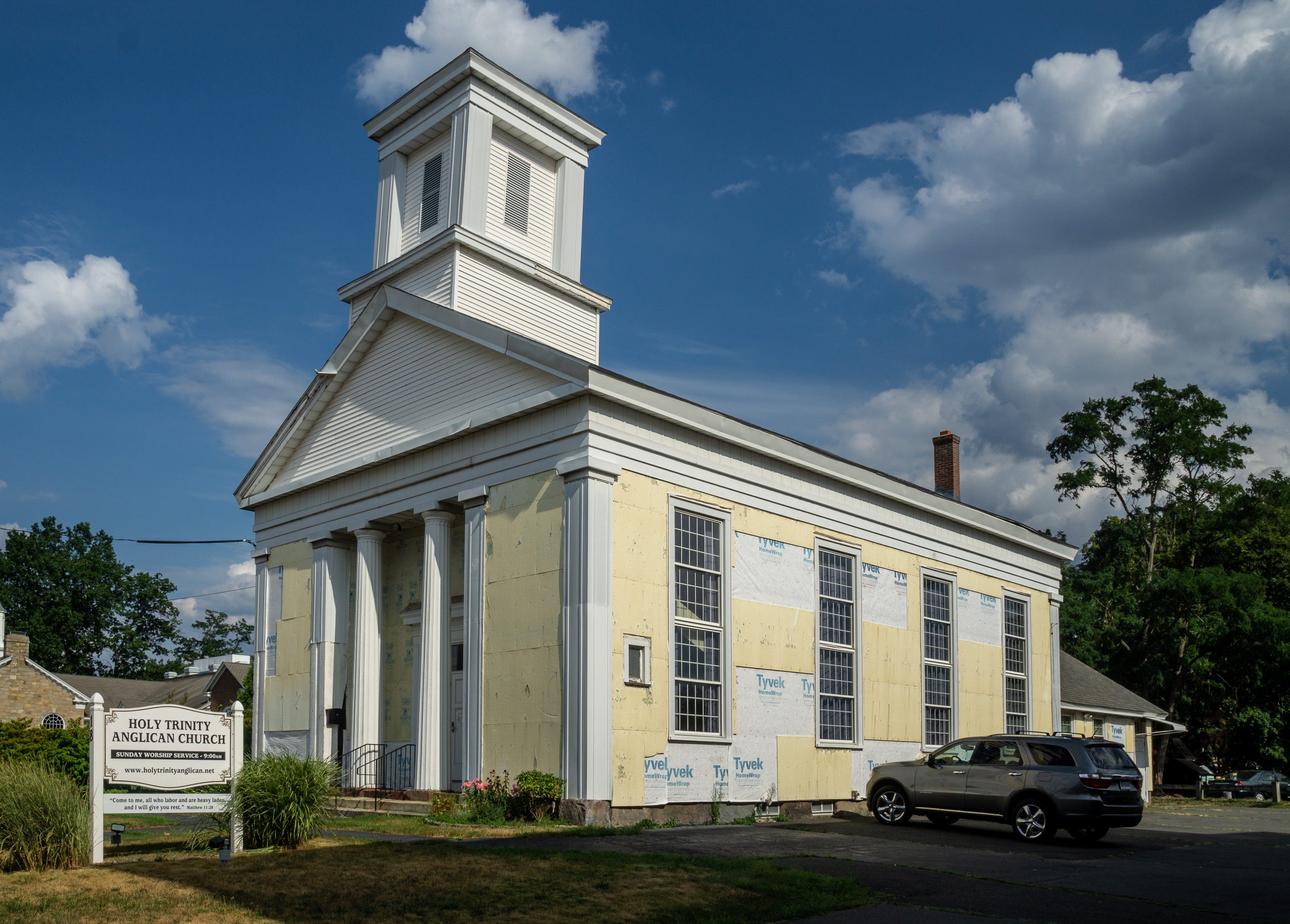
Holy Trinity Anglican Church, an ADLW congregation in Plainville, Connecticut

ADLW encompasses churches composed principally of Nigerian Anglican expatriates, Anglican church plants using pre-1979 prayer book liturgies, and breakaway Episcopal Church parishes. Its doctrinal distinctives focus on Reformed theology, and its churchmanship tends to be low church with use of the 1662, 1928 or 2019 editions of the Book of Common Prayer. The Church of Nigeria Prayer Book and the Prayer Book Society's 2008 Anglican Prayer Book are also authorized for use. The diocese ordains men only to the priesthood and women and men to the diaconate.

== History ==
The Convocation of Anglicans in North America was launched by the Church of Nigeria as a missionary church body in the United States, with Martyn Minns as the first missionary bishop, elected in June 2006 and consecrated in Abuja, Nigeria, by Archbishop Peter Akinola in August 2006. He was installed as Missionary Bishop of CANA in May 2007. The work of CANA led to the decision of the Church of Nigeria, in November 2011, to create three new missionary dioceses, the first of which was the Missionary Diocese of the Trinity, launched in 2012.

CANA East was started as a diocese-in-formation in 2012 and held its first Synod at one of its church plants, Christ Church Anglican on the Main Line in Wayne, Pennsylvania, on May 2–4, 2013 with New Zealand native Julian Dobbs as the first bishop. CANA East was unanimously accepted as a new ACNA diocese at the 5th Provincial Council, on 18 June 2013.

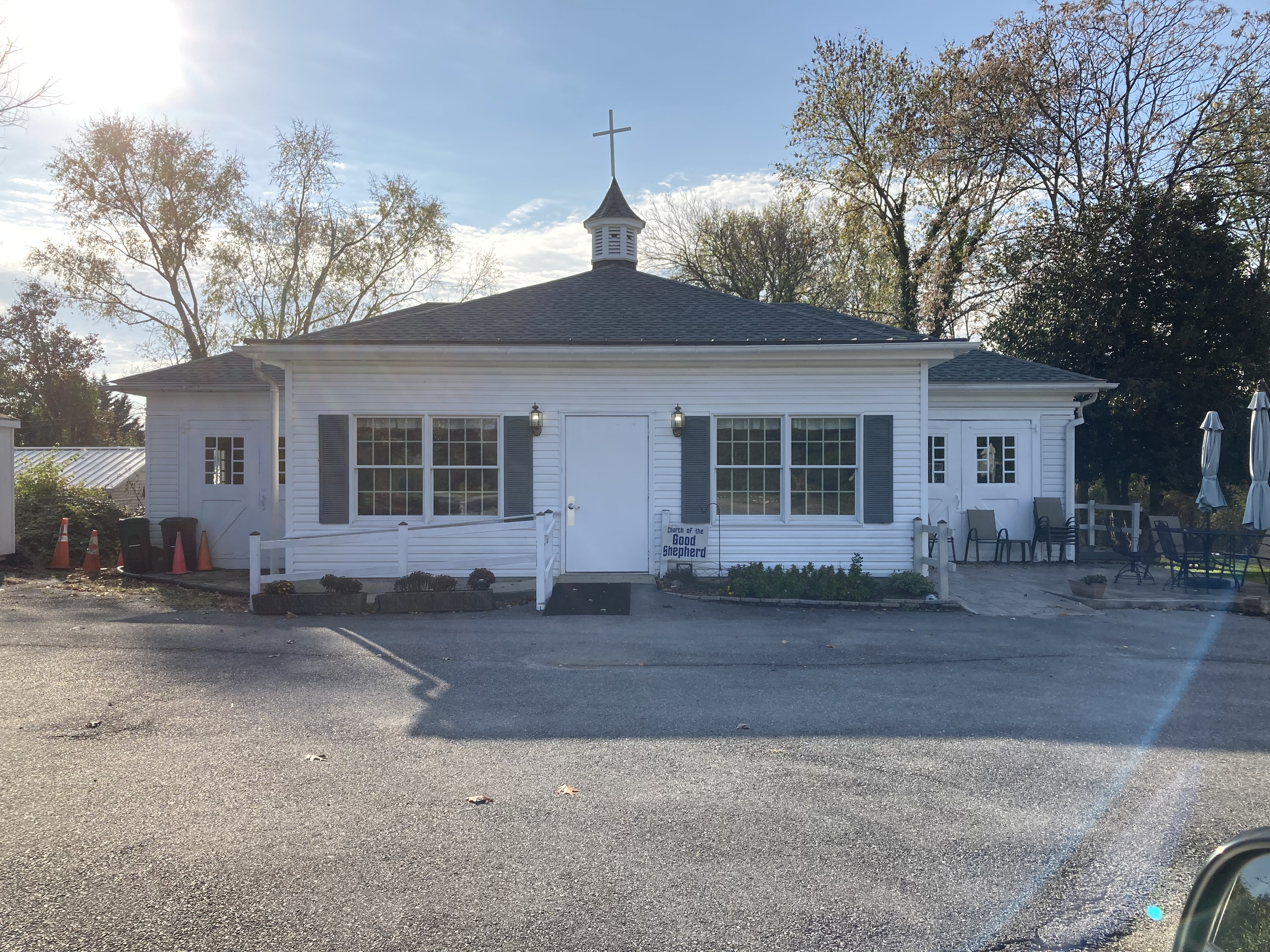
Good Shepherd Church, an ADLW member congregation in Catonsville, Maryland.

The ACNA and the Church of Nigeria signed an agreement that stated that the three dioceses that have resulted from the Convocation of Anglicans in North America activity in the United States, the Missionary Diocese of the Trinity, the Missionary Diocese of CANA East and the Missionary Diocese of CANA West, could decide their own affiliation in any of both churches, on 12 March 2019. This agreement was the result of the election of four suffragan bishops for the Missionary Diocese of the Trinity, composed mostly of Nigerian expatriates in the United States, by the Church of Nigeria, without the consultation of the ACNA College of Bishops. Until then all the three dioceses were members of both churches.

The Missionary Diocese of CANA East announced on 21 May 2019 its decision to withdraw membership in the Church of Nigeria to become solely a diocese of the Anglican Church in North America, with the name of Anglican Diocese of the Living Word.

The Diocese announced the appointment of former Episcopal Bishop of Albany, William H. Love, as assisting bishop on 3 April 2021. A week later Daniel W. Herzog, also a former bishop of Albany, joined the diocese as a retired bishop.

In 2022, Julian Dobbs' pastoral address at the ADLW synod received national media attention, with magazine columnist and blogger Rod Dreher referring to Dobbs as "the based bishop". In the address, Dobbs denounced abortion (praising the ADLW-affiliated Sisters of St. Mary, which was sued by New York state for refusing to cover abortion in its health insurance plans), praised the United States as "a force that protected human freedoms and Christian liberties," and rejected progressive perspectives on gender identity (saying that "[a]ny confusion of the sexes is a distortion of God's created order.").

On September 25, 2025, the Standing Committee of the ADLW issued a statement dismissing public allegations of financial misconduct and misappropriation of funds by Dobbs between the years 2017 and 2019, when the ADLW was known as the Missionary Diocese of CANA East under the Church of Nigeria. Based on an internal audit conducted using QuickBooks, the Standing Committee reported their unanimous judgment that the allegations of financial misconduct by Dobbs were "without merit and slanderous in nature." Katartismos Global Inc. is a subsidiary 501(c)(3) charity organization associated with the Anglican Diocese of the Living Word and based in Manassas, Virginia.

== Parishes ==
In 2025, the Diocese of the Living Word reported 46 parishes (up 5% from 2022) with 2,610 members (up 15% from 2022) and an average Sunday attendance of 2,122 (up 41% from 2022). Notable parishes in the diocese include:

Church	Image	City	Year founded	Year completed	Notes
Bishop Seabury Anglican Church		Gales Ferry, Connecticut	1875	1857	Diocesan pro-cathedral
St. George's Anglican Church		Helmetta, New Jersey	1894	1894	Historic district contributing property
St. Leonard's Anglican Church		Brooklyn, New York	1944	1909	NRHP listed
Church of the Advent		Southern Pines, North Carolina	2022	1928	Historic district contributing property
