= Institute for the Study of Islam and Christianity =

Religious organization based in the United Kingdom

The Institute for the Study of Islam and Christianity (ISIC) is an independent non-profit academic institute which looks at the study of Islam, Christianity and Muslim-Christian relations.

Founded in 1989 ISIC's director is Patrick Sookhdeo who gained a Ph.D. from the Department of Languages of the Near and Middle East at London University's School of Oriental and African Studies and is a commentator on jihadist ideology.

The institute was said to have ceased to operate in June 2009 however sometime in 2013 a new website emerged.

== See also ==
- Barnabas Fund
