= Anglican Diocese of Aba Ngwa North =

Anglican diocese in Nigeria

Coordinates: 5°20′N 7°19′E

The Anglican Diocese of Aba Ngwa North is one of nine dioceses within the Anglican Province of Aba, itself one of 14 ecclesiastical provinces within the Church of Nigeria. The current bishop is the Right Rev. Nathan Kanu.

The diocese was established in 2007 and the pioneer bishop was John Ezirim. After his death in 2008, Nathan Kanu was enthroned as the second bishop on 29 April 2009.
