= Anglican Diocese of Nike =

Anglican diocese in Nigeria

Diocese of Nike

Location
- Ecclesiastical province: Enugu

Information
- First holder: Evans Ibeagha
- Formation: 18 April 2007

Website
- site.nikedioceseanglicancommunion.org

The Anglican Diocese of Nike is one of the 12 Anglican dioceses within the Anglican Province of Enugu, which is itself one of 14 ecclesiastical provinces within the Church of Nigeria.

The diocese was inaugurated on 18 April 2007 as the 116th diocese in the Church of Nigeria. The inaugural bishop was Evans Jonathan Ibeagha and the current incumbent is the Right Rev. Christian Onyia.
