= Cletus Tambari =

Anglican bishop in Nigeria

Cletus Ajigben Tambari
- Bishop of Gombe
- Church: Anglican Church
- Diocese: Gombe
- Predecessor: Henry Ndukuba

Orders
- Consecration: 10 January 2020

Cletus Tambari is an Anglican bishop in Nigeria. He is the current Bishop of Gombe, one of ten dioceses within the Anglican Province of Jos, itself one of 14 provinces within the Church of Nigeria.
