= Evans Ibeagha =

Anglican bishop in Nigeria

Evans Jonathan Ibeagha is a former Anglican bishop in Nigeria. He was the inaugural Bishop of Nike until his retirement in 2019.

He was elected in 2007 as the first Bishop of Nike.
