= John Ezirim =

Anglican bishop in Nigeria

John Ezirim (died 13 December 2008) was the pioneer Anglican Bishop of Aba Ngwa North in Aba Province of the Church of Nigeria.

Ezirim was enthroned as first Bishop of Aba Ngwa North in April 2007. He died on 13 December 2008 and was replaced by Nathan Kanu.
