= Patrick Sookhdeo =

British activist (1947–2026)

- Born: 20 March 1947; British Guiana
- Died: 18 May 2026 (aged 79)
- Education: SOAS University of London
- Organisation(s): Institute for the Study of Islam and Christianity; Barnabas Fund

Patrick Sookhdeo (20 March 1947 – 18 May 2026) was a British activist who was director of the Institute for the Study of Islam and Christianity, and was for 22 years international director of the Barnabas Fund. He was also a commentator on jihadist ideology, and lectured British and NATO military officers on Islamic extremism. Sookhdeo was the author of a number of books.

In 2015, Sookhdeo was found guilty of sexual assault. He had been temporarily suspended from his role at Barnabas Fund but was subsequently reinstated. In 2018, he was tried and found not guilty of a separate historic allegation of indecent assault.

== Background ==
Patrick Sookhdeo was born on 20 March 1947 in British Guiana (now Guyana), into a Muslim family. His family migrated to England in the late 1950s, and in 1965 the student Sookhdeo converted to Christianity. In 1967 he pursued studies at London Bible College (now the London School of Theology) and went on to obtain a doctorate in 2000 from London University's School of Oriental and African Studies. During that time Sookhdeo began exploring interfaith dialogue and became increasingly concerned by the brutality being levelled at Christian minorities in Islamic nations, and the Islamic death penalties for conversion from Islam.

In 1975 with his wife Rosemary, Sookhdeo founded "In Contact Ministries", now called Servants Fellowship International promoting evangelism and compassionate ministries in multi-cultural urban contexts in the UK. During this period, Sookhdeo was also one of the organisers of the early Greenbelt Christian arts festivals.

In 1989, Sookhdeo created the London-based Institute for the Study of Islam and Christianity, and this saw the creation of a global database on extremist movements and ideologies whose followers were persecuting religious minorities across the Muslim world. By 1991, Sookhdeo was predicting that an "Islamic storm" was on the horizon. He was the International Director of the Barnabas Fund, a charity that supports persecuted Christian minorities around the world.

Sookhdeo was the founder and Chairman of the Westminster Institute, a Virginia based think tank.

He was the author of numerous papers and author/editor of several books, including Global Jihad: The Future in the Face of Militant Islam (reviews of which are accessible here) and Understanding Islamist Terrorism. Melanie Phillips reported in The Spectator that Sookhdeo received death threats following the publication of Global Jihad. A number of his books have been translated into German, Romanian and Russian, and at least one book is translated into Norwegian (A Christian's Pocketguide to Islam/Den kristnes lommeguide til Islam). In 2007 he participated in the international counter-jihad conference in Brussels.

Sookhdeo died on 18 May 2026, aged 79. His widow, Rosemary, is the author of Secrets Behind The Burqa.

== Sexual assault conviction ==
On 10 March 2014, The Independent newspaper reported that Sookhdeo had been arrested on suspicion of sexual assault against a woman. He denied the charges. On 18 May 2014, Sookhdeo was formally charged by British police with sexual assault on a woman. He was released on police bail to appear at the Swindon Magistrates' Court later in the month. Following his arrest and indictment, Barnabas UK launched an internal investigation and temporarily suspended him from his duties. In June 2014, Sookhdeo was reinstated after the board decided that there was insufficient evidence of sexual assault. Later, it was alleged that Sookhdeo had used "intimidating and manipulative" language against two prosecution witnesses.

On 23 February 2015, Sookhdeo was found guilty by a majority 10–2 verdict of the jury at Swindon Crown Court on the charge of sexual assault and unanimously on the two further charges of intimidating witnesses. He was ordered to serve a three-month community sentence, and ordered to pay £3500 prosecution costs and a £60 victim surcharge. However, he was subsequently reinstated to his positions as a trustee of Barnabas Aid International and as the International Director and CEO of the Barnabas Fund. Sookhdeo’s conviction drew mixed responses from within the British Christian community and media. By contrast, the Orthodox Anglican website Virtueonline's managing editor David Virtue criticised the legal process as a travesty, asserted Sookhdeo's innocence, and cited concerns about the complainant's behaviour and inconsistencies in her testimony.

On 21 November 2015, Sookhdeo was arrested by the Metropolitan Police at Heathrow Airport on suspicion of indecent assault. The following day, Sookhdeo resigned from all roles at Barnabas Aid International and Barnabas Fund due to the media publicity around his arrest. In February 2016, the trustees of the Barnabas Fund defended Sookhdeo and announced his intention to appeal the conviction. They reported that twelve senior Anglican figures had concluded after looking at the evidence that "there had been a concerted move to take Patrick Sookhdeo down and destroy the Barnabas Fund." It also described Sookhdeo's arrest by armed officers from the Metropolitan Police at Heathrow after an 'all ports' alert had been issued for him, even though for a month prior, he had been living in his own home 100 metres from the police station which prompted the arrest.

In early March 2016, it was reported that Sookhdeo was facing historical sexual assault charges against a woman dating back to 1977. On 4 April 2016, Sookhdeo appeared in the Thames District Court where he was arraigned on one count of indecent assault on a woman aged 16 or over in Plaistow, East London, in 1977. At Snaresbrook Crown Court the jury unanimously found him not guilty on 2 August 2018.

== Criticism and praise ==
Hamza A. Bajwa, News Editor of The Muslim Weekly, has criticised Sookhdeo, claiming that he presents a distorted image of Islam and Muslims, and Mehdi Hasan in The Guardian accused him of being a "crude, anti-Islam propagandist". Against this, Sheikh Dr Muhammed Al-Husseini, a Muslim scholar from the interfaith organisation Scriptural Reasoning, has said of Sookhdeo: "It is an absolute pleasure to be with somebody who is a very highly valued colleague, a deeply trusted colleague and for whose work I have the highest regard." A joint statement in support of Sookhdeo was also published by Muhammed Al-Husseini and Islamic thinker and reformer Tawfik Hamid as a response to the Guardian article.

== Works ==
=== Books and booklets ===
- 1972 – The Asian in Britain, London: Community and Race Relations Unit of the British Council of Churches (booklet)
- 1972 – Asians in Britain : a Christian understanding, Church Pastoral-Aid Society, ISBN 0-85491-831-0
- 1983 – Christianity & Other Faiths, Paternoster Press, ISBN 0-85364-363-6
- 2001 – A Christian's Pocket Guide to Islam, Christian Focus and Isaac, ISBN 1-85792-699-4 (also 2006, ISBN 1-84550-119-5)
- 2002 – A People Betrayed: The Impact of Islamisation on the Christian Community in Pakistan, Christian Focus Publications; Isaac Publishing, ISBN 1-85792-785-0
- 2004 – Understanding Islamic Terrorism: The Islamic Doctrine of War, Isaac Publishing, ISBN 0-9547835-0-6 (published in US 2009 as "Understanding Islamist Terrorism: The Islamic Doctrine of War", ISBN 978-0-9787141-6-1)
- 2006 – Islam the Challenge to the Church, Isaac Publishing, ISBN 0-9547835-4-9
- 2007 – Global Jihad: The Future in the Face of Militant Islam, Isaac Publishing, ISBN 978-0-9787141-2-3
- 2008 – Faith, Power and Territory: A Handbook of British Islam, Isaac Publishing, ISBN 978-0-9787141-3-0
- 2008 – Understanding Shari'a Finance: The Muslim challenge to Western economics, Isaac Publishing, ISBN 978-0-9787141-7-8
- 2009 – The Challenge of Islam: To the Church and Its Mission, Isaac Publishing, ISBN 978-0-9787141-5-4 (2nd rev. ed. of "Islam the Challenge to the Church")
- 2009 – Freedom to Believe – Challenging Islam's Apostasy Law, Isaac Publishing, ISBN 978-0-9787141-9-2
- 2010 – A Pocket Guide to Islam, Christian Focus Publications ; Isaac Publishing, ISBN 978-1-84550-583-7 (2nd rev. ed. of "A Christian's Pocket Guide to Islam")
- 2010 – My Devotional Journal, Isaac Publishing, ISBN 978-0-982-5218-2-3
- 2011 – Islam in our Midst, The Challenge to Our Christian Heritage, Isaac Publishing, ISBN 978-0-982-5218-5-4
- 2012 – Heroes of our faith – Inspiration and strength for daily living, Isaac Publishing, ISBN 978-0-982-5218-9-2
- 2012 – Is the Muslim Isa the Biblical Jesus?, Isaac Publishing, ISBN 978-0-985-3109-1-2
- 2019 – Hated Without a Reason: The Remarkable Story of Christian Persecution over the Centuries, Isaac Publishing, ISBN 978-1-732-1952-4-0

=== Co-authored or contributed ===
- 1982 – Christianity and Marxism, with Alan Scarfe, Paternoster Press, ISBN 0-85364-289-3
- 1991 – Sharing Good News: The Gospel and Your Asian Neighbours, Scripture Union, ISBN 0-86201-547-2
- 2004 – Christians in the Muslim World in The Myth of Islamic Tolerance: How Islamic Law Treats Non-Muslims, Prometheus Books, ISBN 1-59102-249-5
- 2005 – Islam in Britain: The British Muslim Community in February 2005, Isaac Publishing, ISBN 0-9547835-5-7
- 2010 – Ideas Matter: How to Undermine the Extremist Ideology Behind al Qaeda in Towards a Grand Strategy Against Terrorism, McGraw-Hill, ISBN 978-0-07-352779-6
- 2012 – The West, Islam, and the counter-ideological war in Fighting the Ideological War – Winning Strategies from Communism to Islamism, Isaac Publishing, ISBN 978-0-985-3109-0-5
- 2013 – Patrick Sookhdeo in How prayer impacts lives: 41 Christians and their conversations with God, Christian Focus, ISBN 978-1-78191-131-0

=== Edited ===
- 1974 – All One in Christ: The Biblical View of Race, Marshall, ISBN 0-551-05398-4
- 1978 – Jesus Christ the Only Way: Christian Responsibility in the Multicultural Society, Paternoster Press, ISBN 0-85364-236-2
- 1988 – New Frontiers in Mission, Paternoster Press, Baker Book House, ISBN 0-8010-8284-6
- 2004 – The Persecuted Church, Lausanne Committee for World Evangelisation (reprinted in South Africa 2005, 2007)
