= Church of Nigeria North American Mission =

Missionary body of the Church of Nigeria

Location
- Episcopal conference: Church of Nigeria
- Ecclesiastical province: Abuja

Information
- Rite: Anglican

Current leadership
- Coordinating bishop: Celestine Ironna
- Metropolitan Archbishop: Henry Ndukuba

The Church of Nigeria North American Mission (CONNAM) is a missionary body of the Church of Nigeria (CON). It has been in a ministry partnership with the Anglican Church in North America but no longer affiliated with it beyond mutual membership in GAFCON. Founded in 2005 as the Convocation of Anglicans in North America, it was composed primarily of churches that have disaffiliated from the Episcopal Church in the United States of America (ECUSA). CANA was initially a missionary initiative of the Anglican Church of Nigeria for Nigerians living in the United States. It joined several other church bodies in the formation of the Anglican Church in North America in 2009. In 2019, the dual jurisdiction arrangement with the ACNA came to an end, and CANA was reformed as CONNAM, with a special focus on serving Nigerian-American Anglican churches in North America.

== History ==
=== Formation and founding of ACNA ===
CANA was formed in reaction to the decisions of the Episcopal Church USA on several issues, particularly related to international Anglican Communion resolutions at the Lambeth Conference 1998, the Windsor Report, Dromantine (Ireland), and at Dar es Salaam (Tanzania) — including the ordination of non-celibate homosexual clergy, which it opposes as deviant and sinful. Church of Nigeria Primate Peter Akinola desired "to provide a way for congregations that were alienated by the actions of the Episcopal Church to retain fellowship with the Anglican Communion." Its first bishop was Martyn Minns, previously the rector of Truro Church.

In 2009, CANA was one of the founding jurisdictions of the Anglican Church in North America. As geographic ACNA dioceses began to form, several CANA churches, including Truro and the Falls Church Anglican, formed the Anglican District of Virginia and later joined the Diocese of the Mid-Atlantic under Bishop John Guernsey. CANA—and thus the Church of Nigeria—was also the canonical residence for ACNA's chaplains, as CANA Bishop Derek Jones became the first ordinary of the Jurisdiction of the Armed Forces and Chaplaincy (JAFC).

The vision of CON leadership in the early 2010s was to transfer CANA parishes to ACNA jurisdiction. "We are not interested in territorial ambition; our main reason for going to America was to provide for those who were no longer finding it possible to worship in the Episcopal church," CON Primate Nicholas Okoh said in 2011. During the 2010s, other GAFCON member provinces that had provided canonical residence for North American Anglicans—including the Southern Cone and Uganda—transferred parishes back to sole ACNA jurisdiction, as did the Anglican Church of Rwanda with PEARUSA in 2016.

In 2012, CANA launched its first offshoot diocese in the United States, the Missionary Diocese of the Trinity, plus two formal dioceses, CANA East and CANA West and the JAFC, all of which were dual jurisdictions of the Church of Nigeria and ACNA. Minns was succeeded in 2014 as CANA missionary bishop—overseeing all three CANA dioceses—by Julian Dobbs, a CANA suffragan bishop consecrated in 2011. Dobbs also served as bishop of CANA East, while Felix Orji was named bishop of CANA West and Amos Fagbamiye became the first bishop of the Diocese of the Trinity.

=== Separation from and tension with ACNA ===
In 2019, conflict arose between the CON and ACNA leadership. In January, the CON bishops elected four suffragan bishops to serve in the Missionary Diocese of the Trinity, but this election was not submitted to the ACNA college of bishops for consent according to ACNA's canons, with the result that the four bishops, upon consecration, would not be seated in the ACNA. The election of the bishops was also not done in consultation with CANA's missionary bishop, Julian Dobbs, or the bishop of CANA West. Dobbs and Orji commented at the time: "This does not directly affect the mission and ministry of the other CANA dioceses. While we are disappointed by the way this election process has unfolded, this is not a situation that affects our local parishes and their commitment to making disciples and followers of Jesus."

Amid the controversy, the dual jurisdiction came to an end. "This agreement helps us honor the desire of our Nigerian brothers and sisters in North America to remain connected with the Church of Nigeria, while providing for future ministry partnership,” ACNA Primate Foley Beach said. CANA East departed CON and became solely the ACNA Diocese of the Living Word. Unlike other GAFCON provinces, CON retained a diocesan presence in North America, with the stated purpose of serving Nigerian immigrants in North America. CANA West, which was composed of a mixture of Nigerian and Anglo-American adherents, and the Missionary Diocese of the Trinity, which was primarily Nigerian immigrants, remained in the Church of Nigeria.

Additional controversy arose amid the ending of dual jurisdiction. Ahead of the new bishops' scheduled consecration on 3 July 2019 in Lagos, a priest in CANA East filed formal heresy charges against Bishop-Elect Augustine Unuigbe, charging that Unuigbe had advocated "Word of Faith" doctrines and the prosperity gospel, both of which has been rejected by Anglican leaders at the 2018 Global Anglican Future Conference. After an investigation called for by Okoh, Unuigbe apologized for "inadvertent error" and his consecration went ahead as scheduled. Fagbamiye also apologized and said that Unuigbe had "assured the Primate of his continuous commitment to the teachings of the Word of God in its undiluted form and that he will continue to align with the vision of the Church of Nigeria, as a 'Bible-based' Church."

Additional tension between CON and ACNA arose in the winter of 2021. The ACNA college of bishops released "Sexuality and Identity: A Pastoral Statement," in which they said "we do not believe it wise nor commendable to adopt categorically the language of 'gay Christian,' or 'same-sex attracted Christian' as the default description for those who experience same-sex attraction within the ACNA" and "commend[ed] the usage of 'Christians who experience same-sex attraction'" to focus on Christian identity. After several ACNA clergy signed an open letter titled "Dear Gay Anglicans" that was seen to challenge the bishops' statement, Foley Beach commented that the reaction "has already had international ramifications," including from Nigeria. Henry Ndukuba, who had succeeded Okoh as CON primate in 2020, said the ACNA bishops' statement was "tantamount to a subtle capitulation to recognize and promote same-sex relations among its members, exactly the same route of argument adopted by The Episcopal Church (TEC).... These actions which fueled the crisis that has broken the fabrics of the Anglican Communion should not be repeated by ACNA. Manipulating languages to cover up sin and sinners are incompatible with the example of Scripture which condemned sin." Ndukuba added that the "Dear Gay Anglicans" letter "was openly endorsed by some bishops, priests and laity in ACNA. It is a clarion call to recruit Gays into ACNA member parishes. The deadly ‘virus' of homosexuality has infiltrated ACNA."

=== Transition to CONNAM ===
In October 2020, CANA was replaced as a corporate entity by CONNAM (with the two constituent dioceses of the West and the Trinity), and Orji was designated CONNAM's coordinating bishop. In 2021, the JAFC completed the canonical process for removing its residence in the Church of Nigeria and becoming canonically resident in the ACNA. Ndukuba dedicated a new cathedral for CONNAM in Houston in 2021.

In October 2022, new CONNAM bylaws were released, signaling the permanent establishment of CONNAM as an alternative Anglican jurisdiction in the United States and Canada. In response, Orji announced his departure from CONNAM. In leaving, he said "I'm no longer able to be part of a mission that violates my conscience and understanding of Godly Christian ministry and mission in North America" and added that "CoN made a promise to relinquish its mission to a new orthodox Anglican body when it emerges. ... We should not do things simply because we want to do so and because we don't want to be under 'white people' or the cheap blackmail that 'ACNA will/might bless same-sex unions in the future.' Nobody knows in the future or what we ourselves will do in the future. ... It is a horrible thing to imply of our GAFCON partner." Ndukuba suspended Orji from ministry, stating that he "deeply regrets the recent public utterances and actions of Bishop Orji against the authority of the Church of Nigeria."

ACNA received Orji and Diocese of the West Suffragan Bishop Scott Seely into the college of bishops, and the Diocese of the West voted to affiliate with ACNA, although some congregations elected to remain in CONNAM. Ndukuba appointed the Diocese of the West's other suffragan, Celestine Ironna, to oversee congregations remaining with CONNAM on an interim basis.

== Ecumenical relations ==
In October 2009, CANA's leadership reacted to the Catholic Church's proposed creation of personal ordinariates for disaffected traditionalist Anglicans by saying that this provision would probably not have a great impact on the majority of its largely Low Church laity and clergy, who are satisfied with the Anglican realignment movement.
