= Barnabas Aid =

International, interdenominational Christian aid agency

- Founded: 1993
- Founder: Patrick Sookhdeo
- Headquarters: Swindon
- Website: www.barnabasaid.org

Barnabas Aid is an international, interdenominational Christian aid agency that supports Christians who face discrimination or persecution as a consequence of their faith. It was established in 1993 and channels aid to projects run by national Christians in more than 50 countries. It also campaigns in particular for the abolition of the Islamic apostasy law. Its operational headquarters are in Swindon, Wiltshire, and its registered address as the charity Barnabas Fund is at The Rectory in Pewsey, Wiltshire.

In 2015, founder Patrick Sookhdeo resigned as leader of the charity after he was found guilty of sexual assault and intimidating witnesses. He later started working again for the charity as an adviser and later again as international director.

In early 2024, Barnabas Aid commissioned an external investigation by law firm Crowell & Moring into "allegations made by multiple whistle-blowers against the Barnabas founder, Patrick Sookhdeo, and other senior leaders within the organisation". In April 2024, several senior leaders were suspended pending the investigation. in June 2024, the international chief executive, Noel Frost, was dismissed.

In September 2024, the Charity Commission opened a statutory inquiry into Barnabas Aid, and banned it from making payments over £4,000. There had been allegations of excessive spending on corporate payment cards, including on flights to Las Vegas, and inappropriate payments to trustees. There was concern there could be an unexpected £15 million overspend in charity finances.

In January 2025, the Charity Commission extended its investigation into four further charities linked to Barnabas Aid: TBF Trust, Oxford Centre for Religion in Public Life, Reconciliation Trust and Servants Fellowship International. Trustees of the organisation's international board have ordered an independent investigation. The charity has admitted it has let supporters down through a situation which has been described by those within as ‘chaos’.

In June 2026 the Charity Commission appointed interim managers; a move welcomed by the charity.

== See also ==
- Persecution of Christians
