= Henry Ndukuba =

Primate of all Nigeria (Anglican Communion)

The Most Reverend Henry Chukwudum Ndukuba
- Primate of All Nigeria
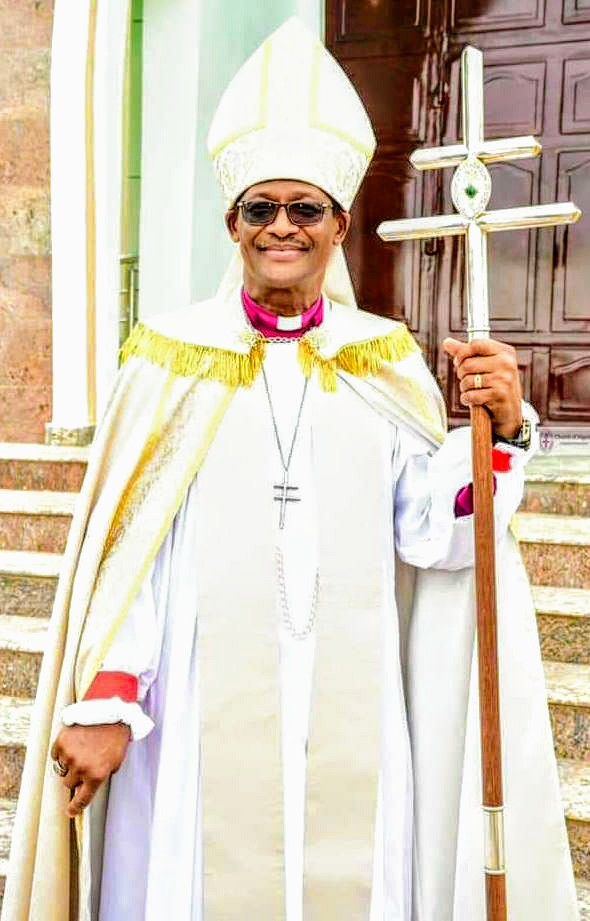
- Church: Church of Nigeria
- Province: Anglican Province of Jos
- Diocese: Anglican Diocese of Gombe
- Elected: September 2019
- Installed: 25 March 2020
- Predecessor: Nicholas Okoh
- Successor: Cletus Ajigben Tambari
- Other posts: Archbishop of Anglican Province of Abuja (2020) Bishop of Abuja (2020) Archbishop of Anglican Province of Jos (2017–2020); Bishop of Anglican Diocese of Gombe (1999–2020)
- Previous post: Archbishop of Jos (2017–2020)

Orders
- Ordination: 1984
- Consecration: September 1999 by J. Abiodun Adetiloye

Personal details
- Born: 18 July 1961 (age 65) Orlu, Imo, Nigeria
- Spouse: Angela Ebere (née Okoro)
- Children: 6
- Education: Theological College of Northern Nigeria (B.D.); Princeton Theological Seminary (MA); Durham University (MA)

Henry Chukwudum Ndukuba // (born 18 July 1961) is a Nigerian Anglican bishop who has served as the Primate of the Church of Nigeria since 2020. He previously served as Archbishop of the Anglican Province of Jos and Bishop of the Anglican Diocese of Gombe.

== Biography ==
Ndukuba was born in Orlu, Imo State, Nigeria, to Silas and Selina Ndukuba, who were church and school teachers associated with the Anglican tradition. He is married to Angela Ebere Ndukuba (née Okoro), an educationist, and they have six children.

== Education ==
Ndukuba attended Bishop Shanahan College, Orlu, completing his West African School Certificate in 1978. He later studied at the Theological College of Northern Nigeria, earning a Bachelor of Divinity degree in 1984. He completed a Master of Arts degree in theology at Durham University in 1990 and another Master of Arts degree in Christian education at Princeton Theological Seminary in 1996.

== Ministry ==
Ndukuba was ordained as a deacon in 1984 and as a priest in 1985. He later served in various clerical roles, including canon and archdeacon, before being consecrated as the first Bishop of the Anglican Diocese of Gombe in September 1999. The diocese was formally inaugurated in November 1999 as part of the Church of Nigeria.

He later served as Archbishop of the Anglican Province of Jos from 2017 to 2020. In September 2019, he was elected Primate of the Church of Nigeria and was enthroned in March 2020, succeeding Nicholas Okoh.

== Controversy ==
In March 2021, comments made by Ndukuba regarding homosexuality drew criticism from the Archbishop of Canterbury, Justin Welby, who stated that the remarks were dehumanising and unacceptable.

In November 2024, Ndukuba stated that the Church of Nigeria would no longer recognise the authority of the Church of England following its decision related to same-sex marriage.

Anglican Communion titles
Preceded by Nicholas Okoh	Primate of the Anglican Church of Nigeria; 2020–	Incumbent
New diocese	Bishop of Gombe; 1999–2020	Succeeded by Cletus Tambari
