= Nicholas Okoh =

Anglican bishop in Nigeria

The Most Reverend Nicholas Okoh
- Primate of all Nigeria, Archbishop of Abuja Province
- Church: Church of Nigeria
- Diocese: Abuja
- In office: March 2010 – March 2020
- Predecessor: Peter Akinola
- Successor: Henry Ndukuba
- Previous post: Archbishop of Bendel

Orders
- Ordination: July 1980
- Consecration: May 2001 by Peter Akinola

Personal details
- Born: 10 November 1952 (age 73) Owa-Alero, Nigeria
- Spouse: Nkasiobi Amaechi
- Children: 5

Nicholas Dikeriehi Orogodo Okoh (born 10 November 1952, at Owa-Alero in the Delta State) is the former archbishop of Abuja Province and primate of the Church of Nigeria in the Anglican Communion. He retired on 25 March 2020. He has been married to Nkasiobi Amaechi since 1986 and they have five children.

== Ecclesiastical career ==
The son of poor peasant farmers, his initial education was at St. Michael's (Anglican) School, in Owa-Alero, from 1958 to 1964, when he got his First School Leaving Certificate. He worked then for four years at his uncle's business, until starting his own. He joined the Nigerian Army in 1969, having not yet been confirmed. He fought in the Nigerian Civil War in 1970, losing his faith at the end of hostilities. He had a sudden conversion in early 1971, reading then the entire Bible. He was confirmed at St. Stephen's Cathedral Ondo, in 1975. Okoh continued his religious studies, becoming a freelance Evangelist and a catechist, from 1975 to 1976. He undertook his Pastoral Studies at Immanuel College of Theology, in Ibadan from 1976 to 1979, obtaining a Diploma in Religious Studies and another in Theology.

He was ordained a deacon in July 1979 and a priest in July 1980. He continued his studies at the University of Ibadan, from 1979 to 1982, receiving a B.A., and later from 1984 to 1985, obtaining his M.A. degree. He became a canon in 1987 and an archdeacon in April 1991. He was consecrated as the second bishop of the Diocese of Asaba in May 2001. He was elected the Archbishop of the Ecclesiastical Province of Bendel on 22 July 2005 following the death of Archbishop Albert Agbaje.

Okoh served in the Nigerian Army, being commissioned as a lieutenant in 1982, promoted to captain in 1986, then to major in 1991 and lieutenant-colonel in 1996, his current rank.

In July 2009, in a sermon in Beckenham, Kent, Okoh made statements suggesting that Africa was under attack from Islam and that Muslims are "mass-producing" children to take over communities on the continent. He said that there was a determined Islamic attack in African countries such as Uganda, Kenya and Rwanda, a statement for which he was criticized by Muslims.

== Archbishop of Nigeria ==
He was elected Primate on September 15, 2009, having worked with the previous Primate, the Most Reverend Peter Akinola for a couple of transition months. He was installed as the 4th Primate of the Church of Nigeria on March 25, 2010, also becoming the 2nd Bishop of Abuja and Archbishop of Abuja Province.

He has been one of the leading names of the Anglican realignment, both as a member of the Fellowship of Confessing Anglicans and the Global South (Anglican). Okoh led the large delegation of 470 members of the Anglican Church of Nigeria to the Global Anglican Future Conference (GAFCON) II, held from 21 to 26 October 2013, in Nairobi, Kenya.

Okoh was one of the speakers at the Colloquium on Marriage, held in the Vatican, in November 2014, at the invitation of Pope Francis, whom he met there. In 2017 he was one of three Anglican primates to decline to attend the international primates' meeting due to disagreements with other churches of the Anglican Communion, citing "broken fellowship over homosexual practice, same-sex marriage, and the blurring of gender identity". Speaking in Abuja in 2018 Okoh said that homosexuality is "veritably poisoning" Nigerian society, blaming satellite broadcasting and international media, and the disruption of traditional culture through urbanisation.

It was announced at the conclusion of GAFCON III, on 22 June 2018 in Jerusalem, that Archbishop Okoh would step down as Chairman of GAFCON's Primates Council effective January 2019. He was succeeded by Archbishop Foley Beach, Primate of the Anglican Church in North America.

Anglican Communion titles
| Preceded by Peter Akinola | Primate of the Anglican Church of Nigeria; 2010–2020 | Succeeded by Henry Ndukuba |
